= Muddy Waters discography =

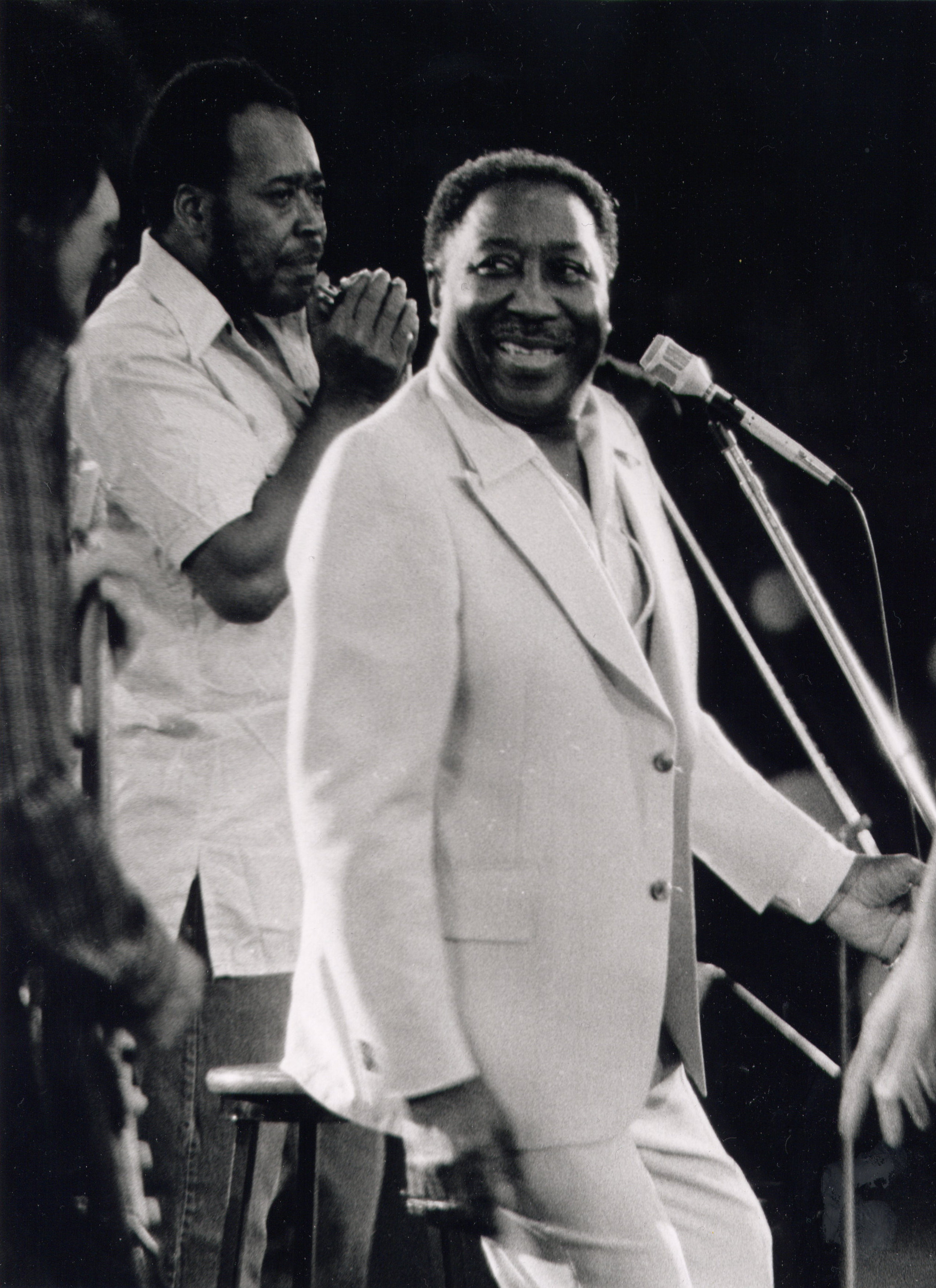
- Muddy Waters with James Cotton in Ontario Place, Toronto (1978)
- Studio albums: 13
- Live albums: 9+
- Compilation albums: 25+
- Singles: 62
- Singles as accompanist: 20
- Albums as accompanist: 17

Muddy Waters (1913–1983) was an American blues artist who is considered a pioneer of the electric Chicago blues and a major influence on the development of blues and rock music. He popularized several early Delta blues songs, such as "Rollin' and Tumblin'", "Walkin' Blues", and "Baby, Please Don't Go", and recorded songs that went on to become blues standards, including "Hoochie Coochie Man", "Mannish Boy", and "Got My Mojo Working". During his recording career from 1941 to 1981, he recorded primarily for two record companies, Aristocrat/Chess and Blue Sky; they issued 62 singles and 13 studio albums (as with most postwar blues musicians, his recordings were released as two-song singles until the 1960s, when the focus shifted to long-playing albums).

While he was living in Mississippi, Waters was recorded by Alan Lomax in 1941 for a U.S. Library of Congress folk music project. Two songs were released on a 78 rpm record, "Country Blues" and "I Be's Troubled". After moving to Chicago, he recorded for Leonard Chess and Aristocrat issued Waters's first single in 1947. In 1950, Chess bought out his label partners and formed Chess Records. From 1950 to 1958, Chess issued 15 singles that reached the top 10 of Billboard magazine's R&B chart. Among the many albums the label released are the influential early compilation The Best of Muddy Waters (1958) and the live At Newport 1960.

After Chess went out of business in 1975, Waters recorded several successful albums for Blue Sky. Produced by blues rock singer and guitarist Johnny Winter, Hard Again (1977), I'm Ready (1978), and Muddy "Mississippi" Waters – Live (1978) won Grammy Awards for "Best Ethnic or Traditional Recordings". As a sideman, Waters also contributed to recordings by Little Walter, Junior Wells, Otis Spann, and others. After Waters's death in 1983, a large number of compilation and live albums have been issued by various record companies, often with significant overlap and duplication. The double disc The Anthology: 1947–1972 (2001) is ranked at number 483 on Rolling Stone magazine's 2020 list of the "500 Greatest Albums of All Time".

For an in depth, illustrated discography, see https://www.wirz.de/music/waters.htm

== Studio albums ==
List of studio albums with title, album details, chart peak, and reference(s)
Title	Album details	Chart peak U.S. 200	Ref(s)
Muddy Waters Sings "Big Bill"	Released: June 1960; Label: Chess (LP-1444); Format: Mono LP	—	
Folk Singer	Released: January 30, 1964; Label: Chess (LP-1483); Format: Mono LP	—	
Muddy, Brass & the Blues	Released: October 26, 1966; Label: Chess (LP/S-1507); Format: Mono/stereo LP	—	
Electric Mud	Released: October 5, 1968; Label: Cadet Concept (LPS-314); Format: Stereo LP	127 (Note: In 1968, Electric Mud reached number 47 on the RPM chart (Canada).)	
After the Rain	Released: May 12, 1969; Label: Cadet Concept (LPS-320); Format: Stereo LP	—	
Fathers and Sons	Released: August 18, 1969; Label: Chess (LPS-127; reissue: 2CH 50033, 1972); Format: Stereo 2xLP; Note: Sides 1 and 2 are studio recordings	70	
The London Muddy Waters Sessions	Released: April 1972; Label: Chess (CH 60013); Format: Stereo LP	—	
Can't Get No Grindin'	Released: August 1973; Label: Chess (CH 50023); Format: Stereo LP	—	
"Unk" in Funk	Released: March 1974; Label: Chess (CH 60031); Format: Stereo LP	—	
The Muddy Waters Woodstock Album	Released: April 1975; Label: Chess (CH 60035); Format: Stereo LP	—	
Hard Again	Released: January 10, 1977 (Note: Koda places the Hard Again release date as May 1977.); Label: Blue Sky (PZ 34449); Format: Stereo LP	143	
I'm Ready	Released: January 1978; Label: Blue Sky (JZ 34928); Format: Stereo LP	157	
King Bee	Released: 1981; Label: Blue Sky (PZ 37064); Format: Stereo LP	192	
"—" denotes a release that did not chart

== Selected live albums ==
Since Waters's death in 1983, a large number of live albums have been released by a variety of record companies. According to biographer Robert Gordon, "much of it comes from the latter years and the recordings tend to blend." However, some were well-received and appeared on Billboard's Blues albums chart.

List of live albums with title, album details, chart peak, and reference(s)
Title	Album details	Chart peak U.S. Blues	Ref(s)
At Newport 1960	Released: November 15, 1960; Label: Chess (LP 1449); Format: Mono LP	—	
Fathers and Sons	Released: August 1969; Label: Chess (LPS 127); Format: Stereo LP; Note: Sides 3 and 4 are live recordings	— (Note: In 1969, Fathers and Sons reached number 70 on Billboard's 200 album chart.)	
Live at Mr. Kelly's	Released: October 1971 (Note: Dahl places the Live at Mr. Kelly's release date as June 1971.); Label: Chess (CH 50012); Format: Stereo LP; Note: Recorded June 1971	—	
Muddy "Mississippi" Waters – Live	Released: January 1979 (Note: Billboard includes Muddy "Mississippi" Waters – Live on "New LP/Tape Releases" for week ending February 3, 1979.); Label: Blue Sky (JZ 35712; E2K 86559); Format: LP, 2xCD (2003 reissue); Note: Recorded March 18, 1977 – August 26, 1978	—	
Collaboration (Note: Also released as Live in 1958 by MW)	Released: 1995; Label: Tomato (R2 71661); Format: CD; Note: Recorded 1958	—	
Hoochie Coochie Man	Released: 1996; Label: LaserLight (17 101); Format: CD; Note: Recorded 1964	—	
The Lost Tapes (Recorded Live 1971)	Released: 1999; Label: Topcat/Blind Pig (BPCD 5054); Format: LP, CD; Note: Recorded November 1971	—	
Live at the Fillmore Auditorium – San Francisco 1966	Released: 2009; Label: Chess/Geffen/UMe/Universal (179 829); Format: CD; Note: Recorded November 04/05/06, 1966	8	
Live at the Checkerboard Lounge, Chicago 1981	Released: 2012; Label: Eagle Vision; Format: CD, DVD; Note: Muddy Waters band with special guests: The Rolling Stones	15	
Hoochie Coochie Man: Live at the Rising Sun Celebrity Jazz Club	Released: 2016; Label: Justin Time; Format: LP, CD; Note: Recorded December 1978 (Muddy Waters Blues Band), June 1996 (Muddy Waters Tribute Band)	5	
Live at Rockpalast	Released: 2018; Label: MIG/WDR; Format: 2xLP, 2xCD, 2xDVD; Note: Recorded January 1977	7	
The Montreux Years	Released: 2021; Label: BMG Rights Management; Format: 2xLP, CD; Note: Recorded June 1972/June 1974/July 1977	—	
Live In Los Angeles 1954 (Live at the Shrine Auditorium)	Released: 2021; Label: GNP Crescendo; Format: 10" LP; Note: Recorded September 1954	—	
Hollywood Blues Summit (Live at the Ash Grove 1971)	Released: 2023; Label: Liberation Hall; Format: LP, CD; Note: Recorded July 1971	—	
"—" denotes a release that did not chart

== Selected compilation albums ==
Muddy Waters's original two-song singles recorded for Chess were later released on various "Best of" and anthology albums. Over the years, many were repackaged with new titles and re-sequenced, with the earlier versions going out-of-print. In the 1990s, Chess's successor, MCA Records, began releasing compilations, sometimes focusing on different periods during Waters's career as well as broader overviews. Around the same time, Charly Records also released a number of albums of Chess recordings, including the nine CD set The Complete Muddy Waters 1947–1967 (1992). After years of litigation, MCA was able to stop Charly from using Chess material without authorization.

List of compilation albums with title, album details, chart peak, and reference(s)
Title	Album details	Chart peak U.S. Blues	Ref(s)
The Best of Muddy Waters	Released: 1958; Label: Chess (LP-1427); Format: Mono LP; Note: Repackaged and resequenced as Sail On (1969, Chess LP-1539)	—	
The Real Folk Blues	Released: January 1966; Label: Chess (LP-1501); Format: Mono LP	—	
More Real Folk Blues	Released: January 27, 1967; Label: Chess (LP/S-1511); Format: Mono/stereo LP	—	
They Call Me Muddy Waters	Released: February 1971; Label: Chess (CH 1553); Format: LP	—	
McKinley Morganfield A.K.A. Muddy Waters	Released: June 1971; Label: Chess (2CH 60006); Format: 2xLP	—	
Rolling Stone	Released: November 1982; Label: Chess/MCA (CH 8202; CH 9101); Format: LP	—	
Rare and Unissued	Released: 1984; Label: Chess/MCA (CH 9180); Format: Mono LP	—	
Trouble No More: Singles 1955–1959	Released: 1989; Label: Chess/MCA (CH/C/D-9291); Format: LP, cassette, CD	—	
Muddy Waters: The Chess Box	Released: 1989 (Note: Koda places the Chess Box release date as March 1990.); Label: Chess/MCA (CH/C/D-80002); Format: 6xLP, cassette, 3xCD	—	
Blues Sky	Released: June 16, 1992; Label: Columbia/Legacy (ZK/T-49172); Format: CD, cassette	—	
The Complete Plantation Recordings	Released: June 8, 1993; Label: Chess/MCA (CHD/C-9344); Format: CD, cassette	—	
One More Mile (Chess Collectibles, Vol. 1)	Released: 1994; Label: Chess/MCA (CHD/C2-9348); Format: 2xCD, cassette	—	
His Best: 1947 to 1955 [Volume 1]	Released: 1997; Label: Chess/MCA (CHD-9370); Format: CD	—	
His Best: 1956 to 1964 [Volume 2]	Released: 1997; Label: Chess/MCA (CHD-9380); Format: CD	—	
King of the Electric Blues	Released: 1997; Label: Epic/Legacy (65215); Format: CD	—	
The Best of Muddy Waters: 20th Century Masters/The Millennium Collection	Released: 1999; Label: Chess/MCA (CHD-11946); Format: CD	15	
Rollin' Stone: The Golden Anniversary Collection [Volume 1] (1947–1952)	Released: 2000; Label: Chess/MCA (CHD-112301); Format: 2xCD	—	
The Anthology (1947–1972)	Released: 2001; Label: Chess/MCA (CHD-112649); Format: 2xCD	—	
Winning Combinations (split release with John Lee Hooker)	Released: 2001; Label: Universal Special Products (088 112 646-2); Format: CD	8	
Martin Scorsese Presents the Blues: Muddy Waters	Released: 2003; Label: Hip-O (B0000482 02); Format: CD	4	
Hoochie Coochie Man: The Complete Chess Masters, Volume 2 (1952–1958)	Released: 2004; Label: Hip-O Select (B0002758 02); Format: 2xCD	—	
The Definitive Collection	Released: 2006; Label: Chess/Geffen (B0006273 02); Format: CD	14	
The Father of Chicago Blues	Released: 2010; Label: X5 Music Group; Format: CD	1	
Playlist: The Very Best of Muddy Waters	Released: 2011; Label: Epic/Legacy (88697 58709 2); Format: CD	—	
You Shook Me: The Complete Chess Masters, Volume 3 (1958–1963)	Released: 2012; Label: Hip-O Select/Geffen (B0017581 02); Format: 2xCD	—	
"—" denotes a release that did not chart

== Singles ==
Muddy Waters's first 78 rpm record in 1941 listed him using his birth name, McKinley Morganfield. The late 1940s–mid-1950s record releases by Aristocrat Records and Chess Records sometimes used "Muddy Waters and His Guitar" as well as Muddy Waters. From the late 1950s on, he is identified as Muddy Waters.

List of singles with title, year, label, chart peak, and reference(s)
Title A-side / B-side	Year	Label	Chart peak U.S. R&B	Ref(s)
"Country Blues" / "I Be's Troubled"	1941	Library of Congress; AAFS 18	—	
"Gypsy Woman" / "Little Anna Mae"	1948	Aristocrat; 1302	—	
"I Can't Be Satisfied" / "I Feel Like Going Home"	1948	Aristocrat; 1305	11	
"Train Fare Home" / "Sittin' Here and Drinkin'"	1948	Aristocrat; 1306	—	
"You're Gonna Miss Me (When I'm Dead and Gone)" / "Mean Red Spider"	1949	Aristocrat; 1307	—	
"Streamlined Woman" / "Muddy Jumps One" (instrumental)	1949	Aristocrat; 1310	—	
"Little Geneva" / "Canary Bird"	1949	Aristocrat; 1311	—	
"Screaming and Crying" / "Where's My Woman Been"	1950	Aristocrat; 406	—	
"Rollin' and Tumblin' (Part 1)" / "Rollin' and Tumblin' (Part 2)"	1950	Aristocrat; 412	—	
"Rollin' Stone" / "Walkin' Blues"	1950	Chess; 1426	—	
"You're Gonna Need My Help 'I Said' (Gonna Need My Help)" / "Sad Letter Blues"	1950	Chess; 1434	—	
"Louisiana Blues" / "Evans Shuffle" (instrumental) (a.k.a. "Ebony Shuffle")	1950	Chess; 1441	10	
"Long Distance Call" / "Too Young Too Know"	1951	Chess; 1452	8	
"Honey Bee" / "Appealing Blues (Hello Little Girl)"	1951	Chess; 1468	10	
"Still a Fool (Two Trains Running)" / "My Fault"	1951	Chess; 1480	9	
"She Moves Me" / "Early Morning Blues (Before Daybreak)"	1951	Chess; 1490	10	
"All Night Long" / "Country Boy"	1952	Chess; 1509	—	
"Please Have Mercy" / "Looking for My Baby" (a.k.a. "I Can't Be Satisfied")	1952	Chess; 1514	—	
"Standing Around Crying" / "Gone to Main Street"	1952	Chess; 1526	—	
"She's All Right" / "Sad, Sad Day"	1953	Chess; 1537	—	
"Turn the Lamp Down Low (Baby, Please Don't Go)" / "Who's Gonna Be Your Sweet Man"	1953	Chess; 1542	—	
"Mad Love (I Want You to Love Me)" / "Blow Wind Blow"	1953	Chess; 1550	6	
"I'm Your Hoochie Coochie Man" / "She's So Pretty"	1954	Chess; 1560	3	
"Just Make Love to Me (I Just Want to Make Love to You)" / "Oh! Yeh"	1954	Chess; 1571	4	
"I'm Ready" / "I Don't Know Why"	1954	Chess; 1579	4	
"I'm a Natural Born Lover" / "Loving Man"	1954	Chess; 1585	—	
"I Want to Be Loved" / "My Eyes (Keep Me in Trouble)"	1955	Chess; 1596	—	
"Manish Boy (Mannish Boy)" / "Young Fashioned Ways (Old Fashioned Ways)"	1955	Chess; 1602	5 (Note: In 1988, "Mannish Boy" reached number 51 on the UK Singles Chart.)	
"Sugar Sweet (I Can't Call Her Sugar)"	1955	Chess; 1612	11	
/ "Trouble No More"	1955	Chess; 1612	7	
"Forty Days and Forty Nights" / "All Aboard"	1956	Chess; 1620	7	
"Don't Go No Farther (You Need Meat)" / "Diamonds at Your Feet"	1956	Chess; 1630	9	
"Just to Be with You" / "I Got to Find My Baby"	1956	Chess; 1644	—	
"Got My Mojo Working" / "Rock Me"	1957	Chess; 1652	—	
"Good News" / "Come Home Baby (I Wish You Would)"	1957	Chess; 1667	—	
"I Live the Life I Love (I Love the Life I Live)" / "Evil"	1957	Chess; 1680	—	
"I Won't Go On" / "She's Got It"	1958	Chess; 1692	—	
"Close to You" / "She's Nineteen Years Old"	1958	Chess; 1704	9	
"Walking Thru the Park (Walking in the Park)" / "Mean Mistreater"	1959	Chess; 1718	—	
"Clouds in My Heart" / "Ooh Wee"	1959	Chess; 1724	—	
"Take the Bitter with the Sweet" / "She's Into Something"	1959	Chess; 1733	—	
"Recipe for Love" / "Tell Me Baby"	1959	Chess; 1739	—	
"I Feel So Good" / "When I Get to Thinking"	1960	Chess; 1748	—	
"Read Way Back" / "I'm Your Doctor"	1960	Chess; 1752	—	
"Look What You've Done" / "Love Affair"	1960	Chess; 1758	—	
"Tiger in Your Tank" / "Meanest Woman"	1960	Chess; 1765	—	
"Got My Mojo Working (Part 1)" (live) / "Woman Wanted"	1960	Chess; 1774	—	
"Messin' with the Man" / "Lonesome Bedroom Blues"	1961	Chess; 1796	—	
"Going Home" / "Tough Times"	1962	Chess; 1819	—	
"You Shook Me" / "Muddy Waters Twist"	1962	Chess; 1827	—	
"You Need Love" / "Little Brown Bird"	1962	Chess; 1839	—	
"Five Long Years" / "Twenty Four Hours"	1963	Chess; 1862	—	
"The Same Thing" / "You Can't Lose What You Ain't Never Had"	1964	Chess; 1865	—	
"My John the Conquer Root" / "Short Dress Woman"	1964	Chess; 1914	—	
"Put Me in Your Lay Away" / "Still a Fool" (re-release)	1964	Chess; 1921	—	
"My Dog Can't Bark" / "I Got a Rich Man's Woman"	1965	Chess; 1937	—	
"Corine, Corina" / "I'm Your Hoochie Coochie Man" [w/overdubbed horns]	1966	Chess; 1973	—	
"Birdnest on the Ground" / "When the Eagle Flies"	1967	Chess; 2018	—	
"Going Home" (remake) / "I Feel So Good" (remake)	1970	Chess; 2085	—	
"Making Friends" / "Two Steps Forward"	1971	Chess; 2107	—	
"Can't Get No Grindin' (What's the Matter with the Meal)" / "Garbage Man"	1973	Chess; 2143	—	
"The Blues Had a Baby and They Named It Rock and Roll (No. 2)" / "Mannish Boy" (remake, 12-inch single)	1977	Blue Sky; MUDT 1	—	
"I'm Your Hoochie Coochie Man" (remake) / "Mannish Boy" (remake, 12-inch single; edited version)	1977	Blue Sky; MUD 1	—	
"—" denotes a release that did not chart

== As accompanist ==
=== Albums ===
List of albums with title, album details, chart peak, and reference(s)
Title	Album details (sortable by listed artist)	Chart peak U.S. Blues	Ref(s)
Broken Soul Blues (Note: Reissued as Chicago Blues Masters, Vol. 1: Muddy Waters and Memphis Slim (Capitol, 1995))	Memphis Slim; Released: 1961; Label: United Artists (3137); Format: LP	—	
The Blues of Otis Spann (Note: Reissued as Half Ain't Been Told (1980, Black Cat))	Otis Spann; Released: 1964; Label: Decca (UK) (LK 4615); Format: LP	—	
The Blues Never Die!	Otis Spann; Released: 1965; Label: Prestige (7391); Format: LP; Note: credited as "Dirty Rivers"	—	
Big Mama Thornton with the Muddy Waters Blues Band – 1966	Big Mama Thornton; Released: 1966; Label: Arhoolie (1032; 9043); Format: LP, CD	—	
Live at Cafe Au Go Go	John Lee Hooker; Released: 1966; Label: Bluesway (BL/BLS 6002); Format: LP; Note: recorded August 1966	—	
The Blues Is Where It's At	Otis Spann; Released: 1967; Label: Bluesway (BLS 6003); Format: LP	—	
Super Blues	Bo Diddley, Little Walter; Released: 1967 (Note: Koda places the Super Blues release date as November 1968.); Label: Checker (LP/S 3008); Format: LP	—	
The Super Super Blues Band	Bo Diddley, Howlin' Wolf; Released: 1968; Label: Checker (LP/S 3010); Format: LP	—	
The Bottom of the Blues	Otis Spann; Released:1968; Label: Bluesway (BLS 6013); Format: LP	—	
George Smith & the Chicago Blues Band: A Tribute to Little Walter (Note: Reissued by Capitol in 1997)	George "Harmonica" Smith; Released: 1968; Label: World Pacific (WPS 21887); Format: LP	—	
Luther "Georgia Boy Snake" Johnson with the Muddy Waters Blues Band (Note: Some songs reissued on Mud in Your Ear (1973, Muse and others))	Luther "Snake Boy" Johnson (Note: The album cover uses "Luther Georgia Boy Snake Johnson", while album reviewer Cub Koda identifies him as "Luther 'Snake Boy' Johnson".); Released: December 1969; Label: Douglas (LP 781); Format: LP	—	
Come On Home	Luther "Snake Boy" Johnson (Note: The album cover uses "Luther Johnson", while album reviewer Cub Koda identifies him as "Luther 'Snake Boy' Johnson".); Released: 1970; Label: Douglas (LP 789); Format: LP	—	
Nothin' but the Blues	Johnny Winter; Released: August 1977 (Note: Billboard includes Nothin' but the Blues on "Album Radio Action" National Breakouts for the week ending June 29, 1977.); Label: Blue Sky (PZ 34813); Format: LP, cassette	— (Note: Nothin' but the Blues reached number 146 on Billboard's 200 album chart.)	
The Last Waltz	The Band; Released: March 1978; Label: Warner Bros. (3WS 3146); Format: LP	—	
Live the Life (Note: Reissued as I Wanna Come Home (2003, HighTone))	Otis Spann; Released: 1997; Label: Testament (TCD 6001); Format: CD	—	
The Last Waltz (box set re-release)	The Band; Released: April 16, 2002; Label: Warner Bros./Rhino; Format: CD	—	
Breakin' It Up, Breakin' It Down	James Cotton & Johnny Winter; Released: June 2007 (Note: Billboard includes Breakin' It Up, Breakin' It Down on "Top Blues Albums" for the week ending June 30, 2007 (shows two weeks on chart).); Label: Epic/Legacy (88697 07283 2); Format: CD	3	
"—" denotes a release that did not chart

=== Singles ===
List of singles with title, year, listed artist, label, chart peak, and reference(s)
Title A-side / B-side	Year	Listed artist	Label	Chart peak U.S. R&B	Ref(s)
"Johnson Machine Gun" / "Fly Right, Little Girl"	1948	Sunnyland Slim	Aristocrat; 1301	—	
"She Ain’t Nowhere" / "My Baby, My Baby"	1948	Sunnyland Slim	Aristocrat; 1304	—	
"Florida Hurricane" / "So Nice and Kind"	1948	St. Louis Jimmy	Aristocrat; 7001	—	
"Blue Baby" / "I Want My Baby"	1948	Sunnyland Slim	Tempo Tone; 1396	—	
"Locked Out Boogie" / "Shady Grove Blues"	1948	Leroy Foster	Aristocrat; 1234	—	
"Big Town Playboy" / "Shelby County Blues"	1949	Little Johnny (Jones)	Aristocrat; 405	—	
"Bad Acting Woman" / "Muskadine Blues (Take a Walk with Me)"	1950	Baby Face Leroy & Little Walter	Regal; 3296	—	
"Rollin' and Tumblin' (Part 1)" / "Rollin' and Tumblin' (Part 2)"	1950	Baby Face Leroy & Little Walter	Parkway; 501	—	
"I Just Keep Loving Her" / "Moonshine Blues"	1950	Baby Face Leroy & Little Walter	Parkway; 502	—	
"Boll Weevil" / "Red Headed Woman"	1950	Baby Face Leroy & Little Walter	Parkway; 104	—	
"Going Away Baby" / "Today, Today Blues"	1950	Jimmy Rogers	Chess; 1442	—	
"Juke" / "Can't Hold Out Much Longer"	1952	Little Walter	Checker; 758	—	
"The Last Time" / "Out on the Road"	1952	Jimmy Rogers	Chess; 1519	—	
"Left Me with a Broken Heart" / "Act Like You Love Me"	1953	Jimmy Rogers	Chess; 1543	—	
"Chicago Bound" / "Sloppy Drunk"	1954	Jimmy Rogers	Chess; 1574	—	
"'Bout the Break of Day (Early in the Morning)" / "Lawdy! Lawdy!"	1954	Junior Wells	States; 139	—	
"So All Alone (Baby So Long)" [Prison Bars All Around Me] / (Note: Muddy Waters does not perform on the B-side.)	1954	Junior Wells	States; 143	—	
"Blues All Day Long (Blues Leave Me Alone)" /	1955	Jimmy Rogers	Chess; 1616	—	
"Don't Start Me to Talkin'" / "All My Love in Vain"	1955	Sonny Boy Williamson II	Checker; 824	—	
"Key to the Highway" / "Rock Bottom"	1958	Little Walter	Checker; 904	—	
"—" denotes a release that did not chart

== Notes ==
Footnotes

Citations

References

- Chess (1989). Muddy Waters: Chess Box (Box set booklet). Muddy Waters. Chess/MCA Records. OCLC 154264537. CHD3-80002.
- Dahl, Bill (1996). "Muddy Waters". In Erlewine, Michael; Bogdanov, Vladimir; Woodstra, Chris; Koda, Cub (eds.). All Music Guide to the Blues. San Francisco: Miller Freeman Books. ISBN 0-87930-424-3.
- Gordon, Robert (2002). Can't Be Satisfied: The Life and Times of Muddy Waters. Little, Brown. ISBN 0-316-32849-9.
- Herzhaft, Gerard (1992). "Muddy Waters, Blues Standards". Encyclopedia of the Blues. Fayetteville, Arkansas: University of Arkansas Press. ISBN 1-55728-252-8.
- Koda, Cub (1996). "Muddy Waters at Newport, The Best of Muddy Waters". In Erlewine, Michael; Bogdanov, Vladimir; Woodstra, Chris; Koda, Cub (eds.). All Music Guide to the Blues. San Francisco: Miller Freeman Books. ISBN 0-87930-424-3.
- Mojo (2007). The Mojo Collection: 4th Edition. Edinburgh, Scotland: Canongate Books. ISBN 978-1-84767-643-6.
- Unterberger, Richie (1996). "One More Mile". In Erlewine, Michael; Bogdanov, Vladimir; Woodstra, Chris; Koda, Cub (eds.). All Music Guide to the Blues. San Francisco: Miller Freeman Books. ISBN 0-87930-424-3.
- Whitburn, Joel (1988). "Muddy Waters". Top R&B Singles 1942–1988. Menomonee Falls, Wisconsin: Record Research. ISBN 0-89820-068-7.
- Wight, Phil; Rothwell, Fred (1991). "The Complete Muddy Waters Discography". Blues & Rhythm. No. 200.
