= Rollin' Stone: The Golden Anniversary Collection =

Compilation album by Muddy Waters
- Released: June 27, 2000
- Recorded: 1947 – September 17, 1952, Chicago
- Genre: Blues
- Length: 153:41
- Label: MCA/Chess
- Producer: Leonard & Phil Chess, Andy McKaie
- Compiler: Andy McKaie

Professional ratings
Review scores
| Source | Rating |
|---|---|
| Allmusic | 5/5 stars |
| The Penguin Guide to Blues Recordings | + "crown" |

Rollin' Stone: The Golden Anniversary Collection is a compilation album collecting the first 50 master recordings of blues singer Muddy Waters for Chess Records. The collection spans Muddy's debut with then named Aristocrat Records circa 1947, and traces his evolution as a songwriter and musician up to September 17, 1952 on what became Chess Records after the company changed ownership. It is the first in a series of releases chronicling Muddy Waters' complete recording career at Chess. The second release in the series is Hoochie Coochie Man: The Complete Chess Masters, Volume 2, 1952–1958 (2004) and the third release in the series is You Shook Me: The Complete Chess Masters, Volume 3, 1958 to 1963 (2012).

The Penguin Guide to Blues Recordings awarded the album four stars and a crown, indicating that the authors considered it an outstanding and essential record.

== Track listing ==
All songs written by McKinley Morganfield, except as noted.

=== Disc one ===
1. "Gypsy Woman" – 2:36
2. "Little Anna Mae" – 2:34
3. "Good Lookin' Woman" – 2:45
4. "Mean Disposition" – 2:37
5. "I Can't Be Satisfied" – 2:44
6. "I Feel Like Going Home" – 3:12
7. "Train Fare Home" – 2:48
8. "Down South Blues" – 2:55
9. "Kind Hearted Woman" – 2:38
10. "Sittin' Here And Drinkin' (Whiskey Blues)" – 2:36
11. "You're Gonna Miss Me" – 2:40
12. "Mean Red Spider" – 2:19
13. "Standin' Here Tremblin'" – 2:27
14. "Streamline Woman" – 3:19
15. "Hard Days" – 2:37
16. "Muddy Jumps One" – 2:30
17. "Little Geneva" – 2:49
18. "Canary Bird" – 2:46
19. "Burying Ground" – 2:37
20. "You Gonna Need My Help" – 3:03
21. "Screamin' And Cryin'" – 3:07
22. "Where's My Woman Been" – 3:10
23. "Last Time I Fool Around With You" – 2:38
24. "Walkin' Blues" (Robert Johnson) – 2:59
25. "Rollin' And Tumblin' Part 1" – 3:01
26. "Rollin' And Tumblin' Part 2" – 2:32

=== Disc two ===
1. "Rollin' Stone" – 3:09
2. "Rollin' Stone (Alternate Take)" – 3:02
3. "You're Gonna Need My Help I Said" – 3:08
4. "Sad Letter Blues" – 3:03
5. "Early Morning Blues" – 3:10
6. "Appealing Blues (Hello Little Girl)" – 2:51
7. "Louisiana Blues" – 2:55
8. "Evan's Shuffle" – 2:14
9. "Long Distance Call" – 2:42
10. "Too Young To Know" – 3:14
11. "Honey Bee" – 3:23
12. "Howling Wolf" – 2:40
13. "Country Boy" – 3:13
14. "She Moves Me" – 2:58
15. "My Fault" – 2:44
16. "Still A Fool" – 3:19
17. "They Call Me Muddy Waters" – 3:25
18. "All Night Long" – 2:54
19. "All Night Long (Alternate Take)" – 3:59
20. "All Night Long (Alternate Take #2)" – 3:20
21. "Stuff You Gotta Watch" – 2:51
22. "Lonesome Day" – 3:31
23. "Please Have Mercy" – 3:13
24. "Who's Gonna Be Your Sweet Man" – 3:02

== Personnel ==
=== Original recordings ===
- Muddy Waters – vocals, guitar (all tracks)
- Sunnyland Slim – piano
- Ernest "Big" Crawford – bass
- Alex Atkins – alto sax
- Leroy Foster – guitar, drums
- Johnny Jones – piano
- Jimmy Rogers – guitar, vocals
- Little Walter – harmonica, guitar, vocals
- Leonard Chess – producer, bass drum
- Elgin Evans – drums
- Phil Chess – producer

=== Compilation ===
- Andy McKaie – compilation producer
- Mary Katherine Aldin – liner notes
- Erick Labson – digital remastering
- Beth Stempel – project coordination
- Vartan – art direction
- t42design – design
- Geary Chansley – photo research
- Jason Pastori – photo research
