= The Anthology: 1947–1972 =

Greatest hits album by Muddy Waters
- Released: August 28, 2001
- Recorded: April 1948 – March 1972
- Genre: Chicago blues
- Length: 147:24
- Label: Chess/MCA
- Producer: Leonard Chess; Willie Dixon; Norman Dayron; Andy McKaie

Professional ratings
Review scores
| Source | Rating |
|---|---|
| AllMusic | 5/5 stars |
| The Penguin Guide to Blues Recordings | 4/4 stars |

The Anthology: 1947–1972 is a double compilation album by Chicago blues singer and guitarist Muddy Waters. It contains many of his best-known songs, including his R&B single chart hits "I'm Your Hoochie Coochie Man," "Just Make Love to Me (I Just Want to Make Love to You)," and "I'm Ready." Chess and MCA Records released the set on August 28, 2001.

== Content ==
Disc one features 16 of the 20 songs previously released on His Best: 1947 to 1955. Disc two starts off with "My Eyes (Keep Me in Trouble)" plus three further tracks from His Best: 1947 to 1955. Sixteen more tracks disc two were on His Best: 1956 to 1964 – the four tracks excluded are "All Aboard" (though the remake from the 1969 album Fathers and Sons is present), "She's Into Something," "You Need Love" (later made into "You Need Loving" and "Whole Lotta Love"), and "My Love Strikes Like Lightning." The other tracks on disc two were featured on The Chess Box.

== Reception and awards ==
In his review for AllMusic, Stephen Thomas Erlewine noted "if you're going to be buying two discs to get the full Muddy Waters story, you should get this instead of two separate discs, since it's simply easier."

In 2003, Rolling Stone ranked the album at No. 38 on its list of greatest albums, writing:

The sound he developed was the foundation of Chicago blues – and rock & roll; the thick, bleeding tones of his slide work anticipated rock-guitar distortion by nearly two decades. Jimi Hendrix adapted Waters' "Rollin' Stone" for "Voodoo Chile," Bob Dylan found inspiration in it for "Like a Rolling Stone," and Mick Jagger and Keith Richards took their band's name from it. (Note: In actuality, it was Brian Jones who named The Rolling Stones from the Waters song, not Mick and Keith.) The 50 cuts on these two CDs run from guitar-and-stand-up-bass duets to full-band romps – and they only scratch the surface of Waters' legacy.

== Track listing ==
All songs written by McKinley Morganfield except as indicated.

=== Disc one ===
| No. | Title | Writer(s) | Length |
|---|---|---|---|
| 1. | "Gypsy Woman" | | 2:35 |
| 2. | "I Can't Be Satisfied" | | 2:43 |
| 3. | "I Feel Like Going Home" | | 3:12 |
| 4. | "Train Fare Home Blues" | | 2:48 |
| 5. | "Mean Red Spider" | | 2:19 |
| 6. | "Standin' Here Tremblin'" | | 2:27 |
| 7. | "You Gonna Need My Help" | | 3:03 |
| 8. | "Little Geneva" | | 2:48 |
| 9. | "Rollin' and Tumblin' (Part 1)" | | 2:59 |
| 10. | "Rollin' Stone" | | 3:08 |
| 11. | "Walkin' Blues" | (Robert Johnson) | 2:58 |
| 12. | "Louisiana Blues" | | 2:54 |
| 13. | "Long Distance Call" | | 2:41 |
| 14. | "Honey Bee" | | 3:32 |
| 15. | "Country Boy" | | 3:13 |
| 16. | "She Moves Me" | | 2:58 |
| 17. | "Still a Fool" | | 3:19 |
| 18. | "Stuff You Gotta Watch" | | 2:51 |
| 19. | "Who's Gonna Be Your Sweet Man" | | 3:04 |
| 20. | "Standing Around Crying" | | 3:23 |
| 21. | "Baby, Please Don't Go" | | 3:18 |
| 22. | "Hoochie Coochie Man" | (Willie Dixon) | 2:48 |
| 23. | "I Just Want to Make Love to You" | (Dixon) | 2:52 |
| 24. | "I'm Ready" | (Dixon) | 3:05 |
| 25. | "Young Fashioned Ways" | (Dixon) | 3:02 |
| 26. | "I Want to Be Loved" | (Dixon) | 2:42 |

=== Disc two ===
| No. | Title | Writer(s) | Length |
|---|---|---|---|
| 1. | "My Eyes (Keep Me in Trouble)" | (T-Bone Walker) | 3:12 |
| 2. | "Mannish Boy" | (Morganfield, Mel London, Ellas McDaniel) | 2:58 |
| 3. | "Sugar Sweet" | (London) | 2:31 |
| 4. | "Trouble No More" | | 2:42 |
| 5. | "Forty Days and Forty Nights" | (Bernard Roth) | 2:53 |
| 6. | "Just to Be with You" | (M. Kalfin, Roth) | 3:15 |
| 7. | "Don't Go No Farther" | (Dixon) | 2:56 |
| 8. | "Diamonds at Your Feet" | | 2:26 |
| 9. | "I Love the Life I Live, I Live the Life I Love" | (Dixon) | 2:52 |
| 10. | "Got My Mojo Working" | (Preston Foster, Morganfield) | 2:53 |
| 11. | "Rock Me" | | 3:13 |
| 12. | "Look What You've Done" | | 2:24 |
| 13. | "She's Nineteen Years Old" | | 3:19 |
| 14. | "Close to You" | (Dixon) | 3:07 |
| 15. | "Walking Thru the Park" | | 2:47 |
| 16. | "Take the Bitter with the Sweet" | (James Burke Oden) | 3:08 |
| 17. | "I Feel So Good [Live]" | (Big Bill Broonzy) | 2:58 |
| 18. | "You Shook Me" | (Dixon) | 2:44 |
| 19. | "My Home Is in the Delta" | | 4:00 |
| 20. | "Good Morning Little School Girl" | (Sonny Boy Williamson) | 3:15 |
| 21. | "The Same Thing" | (Dixon) | 2:44 |
| 22. | "You Can't Lose What You Ain't Never Had" | | 2:57 |
| 23. | "All Aboard (from 'Fathers and Sons')" | | 2:53 |
| 24. | "Can't Get No Grindin'" | | 2:45 |

== Personnel ==
Per Allmusic.

=== Performers ===
- Muddy Waters – lead vocals, guitar
- Jimmy Rogers – guitar
- Fred Robinson – guitar
- Earl Hooker – guitar
- Pat Hare – guitar
- Buddy Guy – guitar
- Leroy Foster – guitar
- Luther Tucker – guitar
- Jeffrey M. Carp – harmonica
- James Cotton – harmonica
- Little Walter – harmonica
- Junior Wells – harmonica
- Fred Below – drums
- Leonard Chess – bass drum
- Francis Clay – drums
- Elgin Evans – drums
- Sam Lay – drums
- Clifton James – drums
- Willie Dixon – double bass
- Andrew Stephenson – bass
- Phil Upchurch – bass
- Lafayette Leake – piano
- Otis Spann – piano
- Sunnyland Slim – piano
- A.C. Reed – tenor saxophone

=== Production ===
- Leonard Chess – producer
- Willie Dixon – producer
- Norman Dayron – producer
- Andy McKaie – producer
- Beth Stempel – production coordination
- Mary Katherine Aldin – liner notes
- Andy McKaie – reissue compilation
- Mike Fink – design
- Vartan – art direction
