= McKinley Morganfield A.K.A. Muddy Waters =

Compilation album by Muddy Waters
- Released: June 1971
- Recorded: November 1948 – January 1953
- Studio: Chicago, IL
- Genre: Blues
- Length: 72:10
- Label: Chess; 2CH-60006
- Producer: Phil Chess, Leonard Chess, Ralph Bass, Willie Dixon

Muddy Waters chronology
They Call Me Muddy Waters (1971)	McKinley Morganfield A.K.A. Muddy Waters (1971)	Live at Mr. Kelly's (1971)

McKinley Morganfield A.K.A. Muddy Waters is a compilation album by blues musician Muddy Waters featuring tracks recorded between 1948 and 1953 released by the Chess label in 1971.

== Reception ==
Professional ratings
Review scores
Source	Rating
AllMusic	4.5/5 stars
The Rolling Stone Record Guide	5/5 stars

The Blues Foundation Hall of Fame inducted it as a "Classic of Blues Recording" in 1983. AllMusic reviewer Eugene Chadbourne stated "at the time it was one of the best retrospectives of his material available. Every conceivable classic by Waters is present here, in an intelligently edited presentation that flows through a dozen years of the great bluesman's career. The trip starts with a solo, pure Delta blues sound in 1948, but by 1960 a sophisticated, swinging Chicago blues combo style had been established for several years, with Waters an acknowledged master".

== Track listing ==
All compositions credited to McKinley Morganfield except where noted

1. "Louisiana Blues" – 2:52
2. "I'm Ready" (Willie Dixon) – 3:02
3. "Honey Bee" – 3:20
4. "I Just Want to Make Love to You" (Dixon) – 2:50
5. "Kind-Hearted Woman" – 2:35
6. "She Moves Me" – 2:55
7. "(I'm Your) Hoochie Coochie Man" (Dixon) – 2:49
8. "Long Distance Call" – 2:39
9. "She's All Right" – 2:28
10. "Rollin' Stone" – 3:05
11. "Standing Around Crying" 3:19
12. "Too Young to Know" – 3:12
13. "Walking Thru the Park" – 2:39
14. "Still a Fool" – 3:12
15. "You Can't Lose What You Ain't Never Had" – 2:55
16. "I Can't Be Satisfied" – 2:41
17. "I Want You to Love Me" – 3:01
18. "Rolling and Tumbling" – 2:57
19. "Just to Be With You" – 3:12
20. "You're Gonna Need My Help" – 3:05
21. "Same Thing" (Dixon) – 2:40
22. "My Life Is Ruined" – 3:12
23. "Baby, Please Don't Go" – 3:01
24. "Got My Mojo Working (Part I)" – 4:30
- Recorded in Chicago, IL in December 1947 (track 16), November 1948 (track 5), July 12, 1949 (track 20), February 1950 (track 10 & 18), October 23, 1950 (track 1), January 23, 1951 (tracks 3, 8, 12), July 11, 1951 (tracks 6 & 14), May 12, 1952 (track 11), December 1952 or January 9, 1953 (tracks 9 & 22), September 24, 1953 (track 17), January 7, 1954 (track 7), April 13, 1954 (track 4), September 1, 1954 (track 2), June 29, 1956 (track 19), August 1958 (track 13), July 3, 1960 (tracks 23 & 24), April 9, 1964 (track 15, 21)

== Personnel ==
- Muddy Waters – vocals, guitar
- James Cotton (tracks 23 & 24), Big Walter Horton (tracks 9 & 22), Little Walter (tracks 1–3, 5–8, 12, 14, 17, 19), Junior Wells (track 11) – harmonica
- Otis Spann – piano (tracks 7, 13, 15, 17, 19, 21, 23 & 24)
- Buddy Guy (track 15 & 21), Pat Hare (track 13, 19, 23 & 24), Jimmy Rogers (tracks 2, 7, 9, 11 & 22), Hubert Sumlin (track 19), Luther Tucker (track 13) – guitar
- Ernest "Big" Crawford (tracks 1, 3, 8, 12, 14, 16, 18, 20), Willie Dixon (tracks 13, 15, 19, 21), Andrew Stephens (tracks 23 & 24) – bass
- Fred Below (track 2), Francis Clay (track 13, 23 & 24), Elgin Evans (tracks 4, 7, 11, 14 & 17), S.P. Leary (track 15 & 21), Willie Nix (tracks 9 & 22), Odie Payne (track 19) – drums
- Leonard Chess – bass drum (track 6)
