= The Best of Muddy Waters =

Greatest hits album by Muddy Waters
- Released: April 1958
- Recorded: Chicago, April 1948 – September 1, 1954
- Genre: Chicago blues
- Length: 35:40
- Label: Chess
- Producer: Leonard Chess, Phil Chess

Muddy Waters chronology
The Best of Muddy Waters (1958)	Muddy Waters Sings "Big Bill" (1960)

The Best of Muddy Waters is a greatest hits album by Muddy Waters released by Chess Records in April 1958. The twelve songs were originally issued as singles between 1948 and 1954 and most appeared in Billboard's top 10 Rhythm & Blues Records charts.

The album is the first by Waters and the third by Chess on the long playing (or LP record) format. Chess re-sequenced the tracks and re-titled it Sail On for release in February 1969.

The album was re-released on compact disc in 1987 by Chess and MCA Records. The Blues Foundation Hall of Fame inducted it as a "Classic of Blues Recording" in 1983.

Professional ratings
Review scores
Source	Rating
AllMusic	5/5 stars
Record Mirror	4/5 stars

== Track listing ==
All tracks are written by McKinley Morganfield a.k.a. Muddy Waters, except where noted.

Side one
No.	Title	Writer(s)	Length
1.	"I Just Want to Make Love to You"	Willie Dixon	2:49
2.	"Long Distance Call"		2:38
3.	"Louisiana Blues"		2:49
4.	"Honey Bee"		3:20
5.	"Rollin' Stone"		3:05
6.	"I'm Ready"	Dixon	3:01

Side two
No.	Title	Writer(s)	Length
1.	"Hoochie Coochie"	Dixon	2:49
2.	"She Moves Me"		2:54
3.	"I Want You to Love Me"		3:01
4.	"Standing Around Crying"		3:19
5.	"Still a Fool"		3:14
6.	"I Can't Be Satisfied"		2:41

== Personnel ==
- Muddy Waters – vocals, guitar
- Ernest "Big" Crawford – bass on "Long Distance Call", "Louisiana Blues", "Honey Bee", "I Want You To Love Me", and "I Can't Be Satisfied"
- Willie Dixon – bass on "I Just Want To Make Love To You", "I'm Ready", and "I'm Your Hoochie Coochie Man"
- Little Walter – harmonica on tracks A-1, A-2, A-3, A-6, B-1, B-2, and B-4; guitar on B-5
- Walter "Shakey" Horton – harmonica on B-3 (as credited on LP – Little Walter is the harmonica player on all tracks on this collection where harmonica is present.)
- Jimmy Rogers – guitar on tracks A-1, A-4, A-6, B-1, B-3, and B-4
- Otis Spann – piano on A-1, A-6, B-1, B-3, and B-4
- Fred Below – drums on A-1, A-6, and B-1
- Elgin Evans – washboard on A-3; drums on B-3 and B-4
- Leonard Chess – bass drum on B-2 and B-5
- Studs Terkel – liner notes

== Release history ==
Region	Label	Format	Catalog
United States	Chess	LP	LP 1427
Worldwide reissue	Chess	LP	LP CH-9255
US	Chess	Cassette	CHC-9255
US	Chess/MCA	CD	CHD-31268
Japan	MCA	CD	UICY-3199
