= The Essential Collection (Muddy Waters album) =

Compilation album by Muddy Waters
- Released: 2000
- Genre: Blues
- Length: 60 min
- Label: Universal Music Group/Spectrum Records

Professional ratings
Review scores
Source	Rating
Allmusic	3/5 stars

The Essential Collection is a 20-song compilation of the music of Muddy Waters, spanning work from 1950 through to 1972. The album, released in 2000 by Universal Music Group's Spectrum Records, complements much of his original work with many songs that went on to become classics of the British Invasion when used by other artists.

== Track listing ==
1. "Got My Mojo Working" - 2:53 (Preston Foster, Muddy Waters)
2. "Long Distance Call" - 2:41 (Jerry Livingston, Carl Lampl and Al Hoffman)
3. "Close to You" - 3:14 (Willie Dixon)
4. "I'm Your Hoochie Coochie Man" - 4:51 (Dixon)
5. "She Moves Me" - 2:59 (Waters)
6. "Baby, Please Don't Go" - 3:16 (Waters)
7. "Mad Love (I Want You to Love Me)" - 3:04 (Dixon)
8. "I'm Ready" - 3:03 (Dixon, Waters)
9. "I Just Want to Make Love to You" - 2:51 (Dixon)
10. "I Live the Life I Love, I Love the Life I Live" - 2:54 (Dixon)
11. "She's All Right" - 2:30
12. "Mannish Boy" - 3:49 (Bo Diddley, Mel London, Waters)
13. "Young-Fashioned Ways" - 3:01 (Dixon)
14. "I Want to be Loved" - 2:32 (Dixon)
15. "Louisiana Blues" - 2:51 (Waters)
16. "Forty Days and Forty Nights" - 2:53 (Bernard Roth)
17. "Rollin' Stone" - 3:08 (Waters)
18. "Stuff You Gotta Watch" - 2:50
19. "Garbage Man" - 2:37 (Willie Hammond)
20. "Can't Get No Grindin'" - 2:48 (Waters)
