= The Essential Collection =

The Essential Collection may refer to:

- The Essential Collection (ABBA album)
- The Essential Collection: 1965–1997, an album by the Carpenters
- The Essential Collection (Duran Duran album)
- The Essential Collection (Kirsty MacColl album)
- The Essential Collection (1975–1982), an album by Poco
- The Essential Collection 1995–2005, an album by Ten
- The Essential Collection (Tammi Terrell album)
- The Essential Collection (Muddy Waters album)
