= Algoma, Mississippi =

- Town
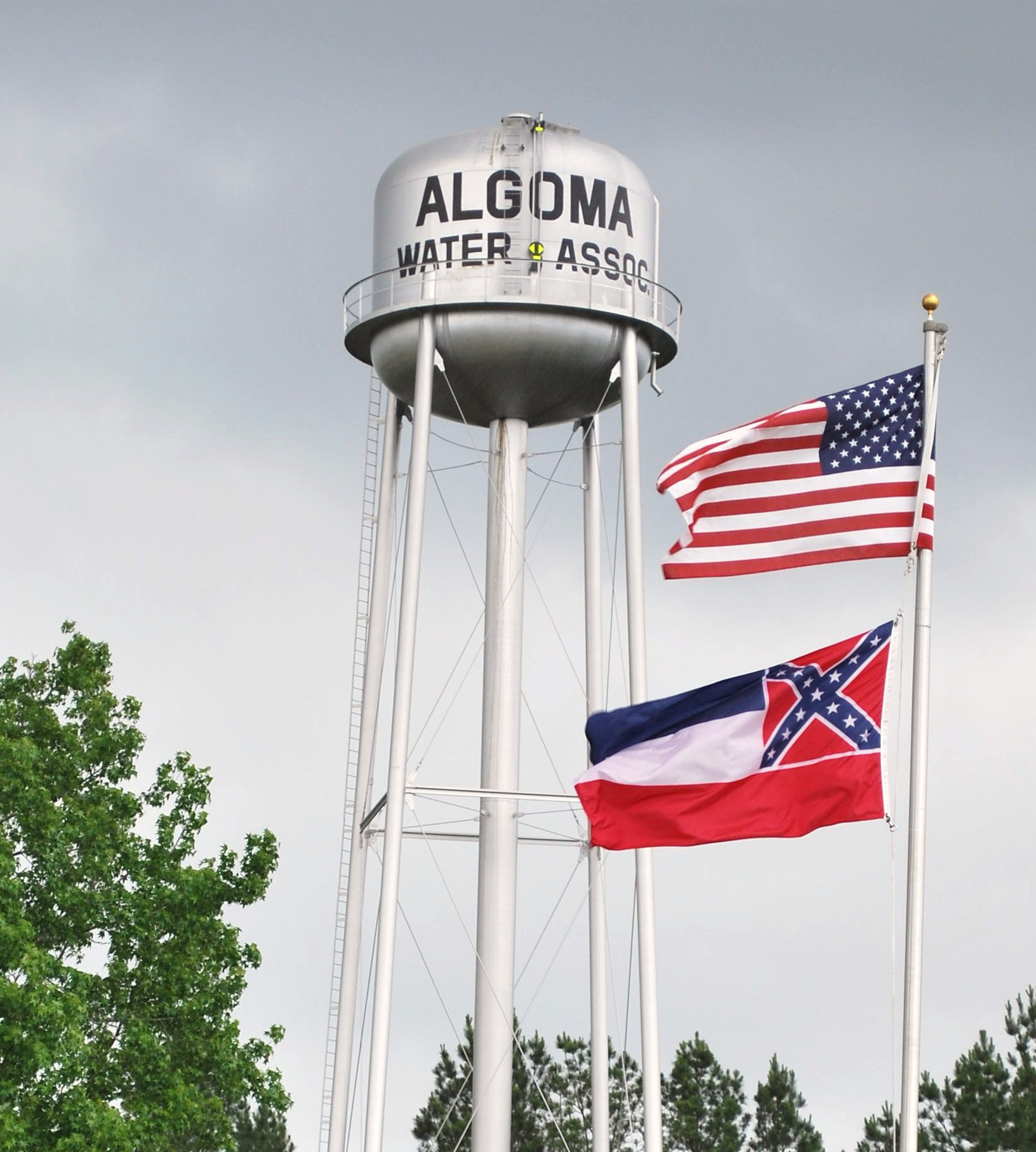
- The Algoma water tower in Algoma, Mississippi. Photo by Michael Jones.

- Flag

- Location of Algoma, Mississippi

- Location in the United States
- Coordinates: 34°10′44″N 89°02′01″W
- Country: United States
- State: Mississippi
- County: Pontotoc

Area
  - Total: 6.62 sq mi (17.15 km^{2})
  - Land: 6.59 sq mi (17.08 km^{2})
  - Water: 0.027 sq mi (0.07 km^{2})
- Elevation: 423 ft (129 m)

Population (2020)
  - Total: 705
  - Density: 106.9/sq mi (41.27/km^{2})
- Time zone: UTC-6 (Central (CST))
  - Summer (DST): UTC-5 (CDT)
- ZIP code: 38820
- Area code: 662
- FIPS code: 28-00820
- GNIS feature ID: 2405132

Algoma is a town in Pontotoc County, Mississippi. The population was 705 at the 2020 census, up from 590 at the 2010 census.

Algoma is a Native American word meaning "vale of flowers".

== Geography ==
According to the United States Census Bureau, the town has a total area of 6.6 square miles (17 km^{2}), of which 6.6 square miles (17 km^{2}) is land and 0.04 square miles (0.10 km^{2}) (0.60%) is water.

=== Climate ===
The climate in this area is characterized by hot, humid summers and generally mild to cool winters. According to the Köppen Climate Classification system, Algoma has a humid subtropical climate, abbreviated "Cfa" on climate maps.

== Demographics ==
=== 2020 census ===
Historical population
Census	Pop.	Note	%±
1990	420		—
2000	508		21.0%
2010	590		16.1%
2020	705		19.5%
U.S. Decennial Census

As of 2020, there were 705 people, 333 households, and 234 families residing in the town.

=== 2000 census ===
As of the census of 2000, there were 508 people, 203 households, and 156 families residing in the town. The population density was 77.2 inhabitants per square mile (29.8/km^{2}). There were 222 housing units at an average density of 33.7 per square mile (13.0/km^{2}). The racial makeup of the town was 77.17% White, 21.65% African American, and 1.18% from two or more races. Hispanic or Latino of any race were 2.36% of the population.

There were 203 households, out of which 33.5% had children under the age of 18 living with them, 61.6% were married couples living together, 13.8% had a female householder with no husband present, and 22.7% were non-families. 20.7% of all households were made up of individuals, and 9.4% had someone living alone who was 65 years of age or older. The average household size was 2.50 and the average family size was 2.90.

In the town, the population was spread out, with 25.0% under the age of 18, 9.3% from 18 to 24, 29.7% from 25 to 44, 21.5% from 45 to 64, and 14.6% who were 65 years of age or older. The median age was 36 years. For every 100 females, there were 88.8 males. For every 100 females age 18 and over, there were 85.9 males.

The median income for a household in the town was $32,333, and the median income for a family was $38,250. Males had a median income of $24,625 versus $18,750 for females. The per capita income for the town was $13,213. About 10.6% of families and 15.0% of the population were below the poverty line, including 15.4% of those under age 18 and 37.7% of those age 65 or over.

== Education ==
The town of Algoma is served by the Pontotoc County School District.

== Algoma Cross Tie Festival ==
The first weekend in October Algoma has its annual "Algoma Cross Tie Festival". This festival is open for all people with live local music, auction, car and tractor show, and selling booths. The Cross-Tie Festival was originally begun in reference to the H. B. Owen Cross-Tie Factory. It was owned by Hardiman Brackett Owen in Algoma, Pontotoc Co., MS. The factory was one of the south's largest industries. Algoma still celebrates with "The Cross-Tie Festival" each year.

== Notable people ==
- Leroy Foster, blues musician.
