= Little Johnny Jones (pianist) =

American blues pianist and singer (1924–1964)

- Born: Johnnie Jones; November 1, 1924; Jackson, Mississippi, U.S.
- Died: November 19, 1964 (aged 40) Chicago, Illinois
- Genres: Blues
- Occupation: Musician
- Instruments: Vocals, piano, harmonica
- Years active: 1946–1964

Little Johnny Jones (born Johnnie Jones; November 1, 1924 – November 19, 1964) was an American Chicago blues pianist and singer, best known for his work with Tampa Red, Muddy Waters, and Elmore James.

== Life and career ==
Jones was born in Jackson, Mississippi, United States, in 1924, and was a cousin of Otis Spann. He arrived in Chicago in 1945 in the company of Little Walter and "Baby Face" Leroy Foster and soon replaced pianist Big Maceo Merriweather in Tampa Red's band after Merriweather suffered a stroke paralysing his right hand. Like several other Chicago pianists of his era, his style was heavily influenced by Merriweather, from whom he had learned and for whom he played piano after Merriweather's stroke.

Jones later backed Muddy Waters on harmonica and recorded a session (on piano and vocals) with him for Aristocrat Records in 1949. He also played on ten sessions with Tampa Red for the Victor label between 1949 and 1953. From 1952 to 1956, he played and recorded with Elmore James, and also played on sessions by Albert King, Jimmy Rogers and others, as well as occasionally recording under his own name. In later years, he worked with Howlin' Wolf, Billy Boy Arnold, Junior Wells, and Magic Sam, among others.

Jones was a heavy drinker and had a reputation as a wild character. According to Homesick James, who worked and toured with them in the 1950s, "Elmore and Johnnie used to just have a fight every night". His 1949 Aristocrat side "Big Town Playboy" is regarded as a classic of the genre, and was covered by the guitarist Eddie Taylor in 1955.

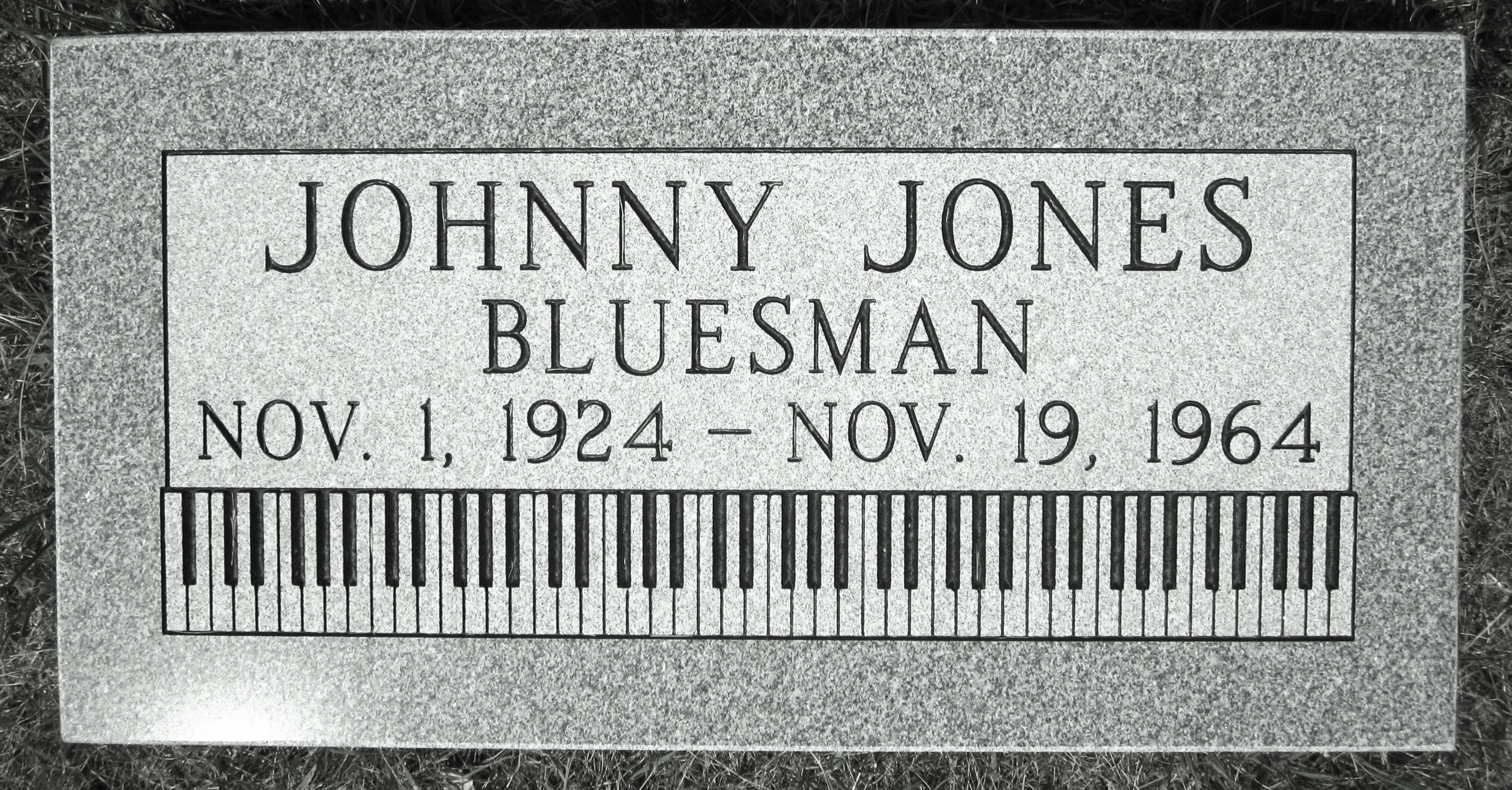
Jones' grave at Restvale Cemetery

Jones married his wife, Letha, in 1952. He died of bronchopneumonia in Cook County Hospital, and was interred at Restvale Cemetery in November 1964.

On May 14, 2011, the fourth annual White Lake Blues Festival took place at the Howmet Playhouse Theater, in Whitehall, Michigan. The event was organized by executive producer Steve Salter, of the nonprofit organization Killer Blues, to raise monies to honor Jones's unmarked grave with a headstone. The concert was a success, and a headstone was placed in June 2011.

== Discography ==
=== Singles ===
- "Big Town Playboy"/"Shelby County Blues", Aristocrat 405
- "Sweet Little Woman"/"I May Be Wrong", Flair 1010
- "Hoy, Hoy"/"Doin' the Best I Can (Up the Line)", Atlantic 1045

=== Albums ===
- Live in Chicago with Billy Boy Arnold, Alligator AL-4717 (1979, recorded 1963)
- Doin' The Best I Can Johnny Jones A Chicago Pianist-About-Town and His Fellow Musicians, JSP Records (UK) JSP4245B (2015) (2 volumes, 53 tracks, Including Johnny Jones backing Elmore James, J.T. Brown, Junior Wells, Tampa Red, Joe Turner)

With Howlin' Wolf

- The Real Folk Blues (Chess, 1956-64 [1965])

== Bibliography ==
- Rowe, M. (1981). Chicago Blues: The City and the Music. New York, Da Capo Press.
