= Muddy Waters Sings "Big Bill" =

Studio album by Muddy Waters
- Released: June 1960
- Recorded: June – August 1959
- Studio: Chicago, IL
- Genre: Blues
- Length: 27:47
- Label: Chess; LP 1444

Muddy Waters chronology
The Best of Muddy Waters (1958)	Muddy Waters Sings "Big Bill" (1960)	At Newport 1960 (1960)

Muddy Waters Sings "Big Bill" is the first studio album, but second overall album, by blues musician Muddy Waters, featuring songs by Big Bill Broonzy, released by the Chess label in 1960.

== Reception ==
Professional ratings
Review scores
Source	Rating
AllMusic	4.5/5 stars
DownBeat	4/5 stars

AllMusic reviewer Cub Koda stated, "Waters's tribute album to the man who gave him his start on the Chicago circuit, this stuff doesn't sound much like Broonzy so much as a virtual recasting of his songs into Muddy's electric Chicago style. Evidently the first time Waters and his band were recorded in stereo ... with some really great harp from James Cotton as an added bonus."

Pete Welding gave the album 4 stars in his DownBeat review. He wrote,

"The idea of Waters performing a collection of Big Bill Broonzy’s tunes would appear to be a good one, for the natural power and ferocity of Muddy’s singing and playing would be strengthened considerably through the employment of songs of greater substance and emotional impact than those with which he ordinarily works. And that’s exactly what happens here. Muddy works within his accustomed groove in these selections, his voice hoarse and insistent, his guitar driving fiercely below it. Rich bluesy harmonica lines . . . ride over the amplified guitar, providing a sharp contrast to the melodies and reinforcing them".

== Track listing ==
All compositions by Big Bill Broonzy except where noted

1. "Tell Me Baby" – 2:15
2. "Southbound Train" – 2:51
3. "When I Get to Thinking" (Harriett Melka) – 3:05
4. "Just a Dream (On My Mind)" – 2:30
5. "Double Trouble" (Melka) – 2:44
6. "I Feel So Good" – 2:53
7. "I Done Got Wise" (McKinley Morganfield) – 2:56
8. "Mopper's Blues" – 2:51
9. "Lonesome Road Blues" – 3:01
10. "Hey, Hey" – 2:41

== Personnel ==
- Muddy Waters – vocals, guitar
- James Cotton – harmonica
- Otis Spann – piano
- Pat Hare – guitar
- Andrew Stephenson – bass
- Francis Clay – drums
