= Muddy Waters =

American blues/foundational rock and roll musician (1913–1983)

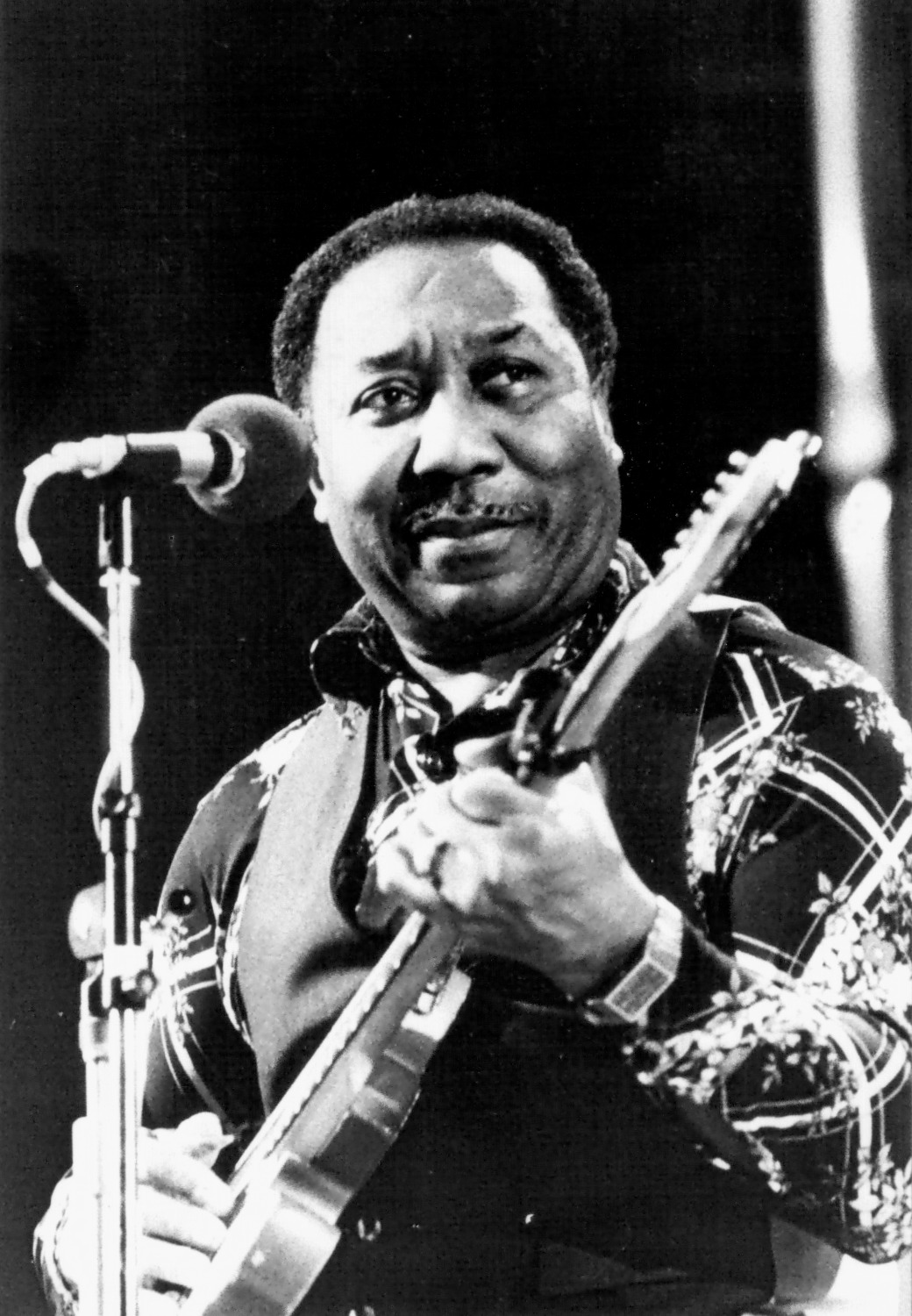
- Waters performing in 1976

Background information
- Born: McKinley Morganfield; April 4, 1913; Issaquena County, Mississippi, U.S.
- Died: April 30, 1983 (aged 70) Westmont, Illinois, U.S.
- Genres: Blues; Chicago blues; Delta blues
- Occupations: Musician; songwriter; bandleader
- Instruments: Vocals; guitar; harmonica
- Works: Muddy Waters discography
- Years active: 1941–1982
- Labels: Aristocrat; Chess; Blue Sky
- Website: muddywatersofficial.com

McKinley Morganfield (April 4, 1913 – April 30, 1983), better known as Muddy Waters, was an American blues singer-songwriter and musician who was an important figure in the post-World War II blues scene, and is often cited as the "father of modern Chicago blues".

Muddy Waters grew up on Stovall Plantation near Clarksdale, Mississippi, and by the age of 17 was playing the guitar and the harmonica, copying local blues artists Son House and Robert Johnson. In 1941, Alan Lomax and professor John W. Work III of Fisk University recorded him in Mississippi for the Library of Congress. In 1943, he moved to Chicago to become a full-time professional musician. In 1946, he recorded his first records for Columbia Records and then for Aristocrat Records, a newly formed label run by brothers Leonard and Phil Chess.

In the early 1950s, Muddy Waters and his band—Little Walter Jacobs on harmonica, Jimmy Rogers on guitar, Elga Edmonds (also known as Elgin Evans) on drums and Otis Spann on piano—recorded several songs that became blues classics, some with the bassist and songwriter Willie Dixon. These songs included "Hoochie Coochie Man", "I Just Want to Make Love to You" and "I'm Ready". In 1958, he traveled to England, laying the foundations of the resurgence of interest in the blues there. His performance at the Newport Jazz Festival in 1960 was recorded and released as his first live album, At Newport 1960.

Muddy Waters' music laid the foundation for various American music genres, including rock and roll and subsequently rock.

== Early life ==
Muddy Waters' place and date of birth are not conclusively known. He stated that he was born in 1915 at Rolling Fork in Sharkey County, Mississippi, but other evidence suggests that he was born in the unincorporated community of Jug's Corner, in neighboring Issaquena County, in 1913. In the 1930s and 1940s, before his rise to fame, the year of his birth was reported as 1913 on his marriage license, recording notes, and musicians' union card. A 1955 interview in the Chicago Defender is the earliest in which he stated 1915 as the year of his birth, and he continued to state that year in interviews from that point onward. The 1920 census lists him as five years old as of March 6, 1920. The Social Security Death Index, relying on the Social Security card application submitted after his move to Chicago in the mid-1940s, lists him as being born April 4, 1913. His gravestone gives his birth year as 1915.

His grandmother, Della Grant, raised him after his mother died shortly after his birth. Grant gave him the nickname "Muddy" at an early age because he loved to play in the muddy water of nearby Deer Creek. "Waters" was added years later, as he began to play harmonica and perform locally in his early teens. He taught himself to play harmonica. The remains of the cabin on Stovall Plantation where he lived in his youth are now at the Delta Blues Museum in Clarksdale, Mississippi.

He had his first introduction to music in church: "I used to belong to church. I was a good Baptist, singing in the church. So I got all of my good moaning and trembling going on for me right out of church," he recalled. By the time he was 17, he had purchased his first guitar. "I sold the last horse that we had. Made about fifteen dollars for him, gave my grandmother seven dollars and fifty cents, I kept seven-fifty and paid about two-fifty for that guitar. It was a Stella. The people ordered them from Sears-Roebuck in Chicago." He started playing his songs in joints near his hometown, mostly on a plantation owned by Colonel William Howard Stovall.

== Career ==
=== Early career, 1930s–1948 ===
In the early 1930s, he accompanied Big Joe Williams on tours of the Delta, playing harmonica. Williams recounted to Blewett Thomas that he eventually dropped Muddy "because he was takin' away my women [fans]".

In August 1941, Alan Lomax went to Stovall, Mississippi, on behalf of the Library of Congress to record various country blues musicians. "He brought his stuff down and recorded me right in my house," Muddy told Rolling Stone magazine, "and when he played back the first song I sounded just like anybody's records. Man, you don't know how I felt that Saturday afternoon when I heard that voice and it was my own voice. Later on he sent me two copies of the pressing and a check for twenty bucks, and I carried that record up to the corner and put it on the jukebox. Just played it and played it and said, 'I can do it, I can do it'." Lomax came back in July 1942 to record him again. Both sessions were eventually released by Testament Records as Down on Stovall's Plantation. The complete recordings were reissued by Chess Records on CD as Muddy Waters: The Complete Plantation Recordings. The Historic 1941–42 Library of Congress Field Recordings in 1993 and remastered in 1997.

In 1943, he headed to Chicago with the hope of becoming a full-time professional musician. He recalled arriving in Chicago as the single most momentous event in his life. He lived with a relative for a short period while driving a truck and working in a factory by day and performing at night. Big Bill Broonzy, then one of the leading bluesmen in Chicago, had Muddy open his shows in the rowdy clubs where Broonzy played. This gave him the opportunity to play in front of a large audience. In 1944, he bought his first electric guitar and then formed his first electric combo. He felt obliged to electrify his sound in Chicago because, he said, "When I went into the clubs, the first thing I wanted was an amplifier. Couldn't nobody hear you with an acoustic." His sound reflected the optimism of postwar African Americans. Willie Dixon said that "There was quite a few people around singing the blues but most of them was singing all sad blues. Muddy was giving his blues a little pep."

In 1946, he recorded some songs for Mayo Williams at Columbia Records, with an old-fashioned combo consisting of clarinet, saxophone and piano; they were released a year later with Ivan Ballen's Philadelphia-based 20th Century label, billed as James "Sweet Lucy" Carter and his Orchestra – Muddy Waters' name was not mentioned on the label. Later that year, he began recording for Aristocrat Records, a newly formed label run by the brothers Leonard and Phil Chess. In 1947, he played guitar with Sunnyland Slim on piano on the cuts "Gypsy Woman" and "Little Anna Mae". These were also shelved, but in 1948, "I Can't Be Satisfied" and "I Feel Like Going Home" became hits, and his popularity in clubs began to take off. Soon after, Aristocrat changed its name to Chess Records. His signature tune "Rollin' Stone" also became a hit that year.

=== Commercial success, 1948–1957 ===
Initially, the Chess brothers would not allow Muddy Waters to use his working band in the recording studio; instead, they provided him with bass backing by Ernest "Big" Crawford or by musicians assembled specifically for the recording session, including "Baby Face" Leroy Foster and Johnny Jones. Gradually, Chess relented, and by September 1953 he was recording with one of the most acclaimed blues groups in history: Little Walter Jacobs on harmonica, Jimmy Rogers on guitar, Elga Edmonds (also known as Elgin Evans) on drums, Otis Spann on piano and, sometimes, bassist and songwriter Willie Dixon. The band recorded a number of blues songs which have become classics including "Hoochie Coochie Man", "I Just Want to Make Love to You", and "I'm Ready".

His band became a proving ground for some of the city's best blues talent, with members of the ensemble going on to successful careers of their own. In 1952, Little Walter left when his single "Juke" became a hit, although he continued working with Muddy long after he left the band, appearing on most of Muddy's classic recordings in the 1950s. In 1954, Howlin' Wolf moved to Chicago with money that he earned through the success of the singles he recorded at Sun Records which Chess released, and the legendary rivalry with Muddy began. The rivalry was, in part, stoked by Willie Dixon providing songs to both artists, with Wolf suspecting that Muddy was getting Dixon's best songs. In 1955, Jimmy Rogers left to work exclusively with his own band which had been a sideline until that time.

In the mid-1950s, his singles were frequently on Billboard magazine's various Rhythm & Blues charts including "Sugar Sweet" in 1955 and "Trouble No More", "Forty Days and Forty Nights", and "Don't Go No Farther" in 1956. 1956 also saw the release of one of his best-known numbers, "Got My Mojo Working", although it did not appear on the charts. However, by the late 1950s, his singles success had come to an end, with only "Close to You" reaching the chart in 1958. Also in 1958, Chess released his first compilation album, The Best of Muddy Waters, which collected twelve of his singles up to 1956.

=== Performances and crossover, 1958–1970 ===
Muddy toured England with Spann in 1958 where they were backed by local Dixieland-style or "trad jazz" musicians, including Chris Barber and members of his band. At the time, English audiences had only been exposed to acoustic folk blues, as performed by artists such as Sonny Terry, Brownie McGhee, and Big Bill Broonzy. Both the musicians and audiences were unprepared for his performance, which included electric slide guitar playing. He recalled:

They thought I was a Big Bill Broonzy [but] I wasn't. I had my amplifier and Spann and I was going to do a Chicago thing. We opened up in Leeds, England. I was definitely too loud for them. The next morning we were in the headlines of the paper, 'Screaming Guitar and Howling Piano'.

Although his performances alienated the old guard, some younger musicians, including Alexis Korner and Cyril Davies from Barber's band, were inspired to go in the more modern, electric blues direction. Korner and Davies' own groups included musicians who would later form the Rolling Stones (named after Waters's 1950 hit "Rollin' Stone"), Cream, and Peter Green's Fleetwood Mac.

In the 1960s, his performances continued to introduce a new generation to Chicago blues. At the Newport Jazz Festival, he recorded one of the first live blues albums, At Newport 1960, and his performance of "Got My Mojo Working" was nominated for a Grammy Award. In September 1963, in Chess' attempt to connect with folk music audiences, he recorded Folk Singer, which replaced his trademark electric guitar sound with an acoustic band, including a then-unknown Buddy Guy on acoustic guitar. Folk Singer was not a commercial success, but it was lauded by critic Joe Kane, and in 2003 Rolling Stone magazine placed it at number 280 on its list of the 500 greatest albums of all time. In October 1963, Waters participated in the first of several annual European tours, organized as the American Folk Blues Festival, during which he also performed more acoustic-oriented numbers.

In 1967, he re-recorded several blues standards with Bo Diddley, Little Walter, and Howlin' Wolf, which were marketed as Super Blues and The Super Super Blues Band albums in Chess' attempt to reach a rock audience. The Super Super Blues Band united Howlin' Wolf and Muddy Waters, who had a long-standing rivalry. It was, as Ken Chang wrote in his AllMusic review, flooded with "contentious studio banter [...] more entertaining than the otherwise unmemorable music from this stylistic train wreck". In 1968, at the insistence of Marshall Chess, he recorded Electric Mud, an album intended to revive his career by backing him with Rotary Connection, a psychedelic soul band that Chess had put together. The album proved controversial; although it reached number 127 on the Billboard 200 album chart, it was scorned by many critics, and eventually disowned by Muddy himself:

That Electric Mud record I did, that one was dogshit. But when it first came out, it started selling like wild, and then they started sending them back. They said, "This can't be Muddy Waters with all this shit going on – all this wow-wow and fuzztone."

Nonetheless, six months later he recorded a follow-up album, After the Rain, which had a similar sound and featured many of the same musicians.

Later in 1969, he recorded and released the album Fathers and Sons, where he returned to his classic Chicago sound. Fathers and Sons had an all-star backing band that included Michael Bloomfield and Paul Butterfield, longtime fans whose desire to play with him was the impetus for the album. It was the most successful album of Muddy Waters' career, reaching number 70 on the Billboard 200.

=== Resurgence and later career, 1971–1982 ===
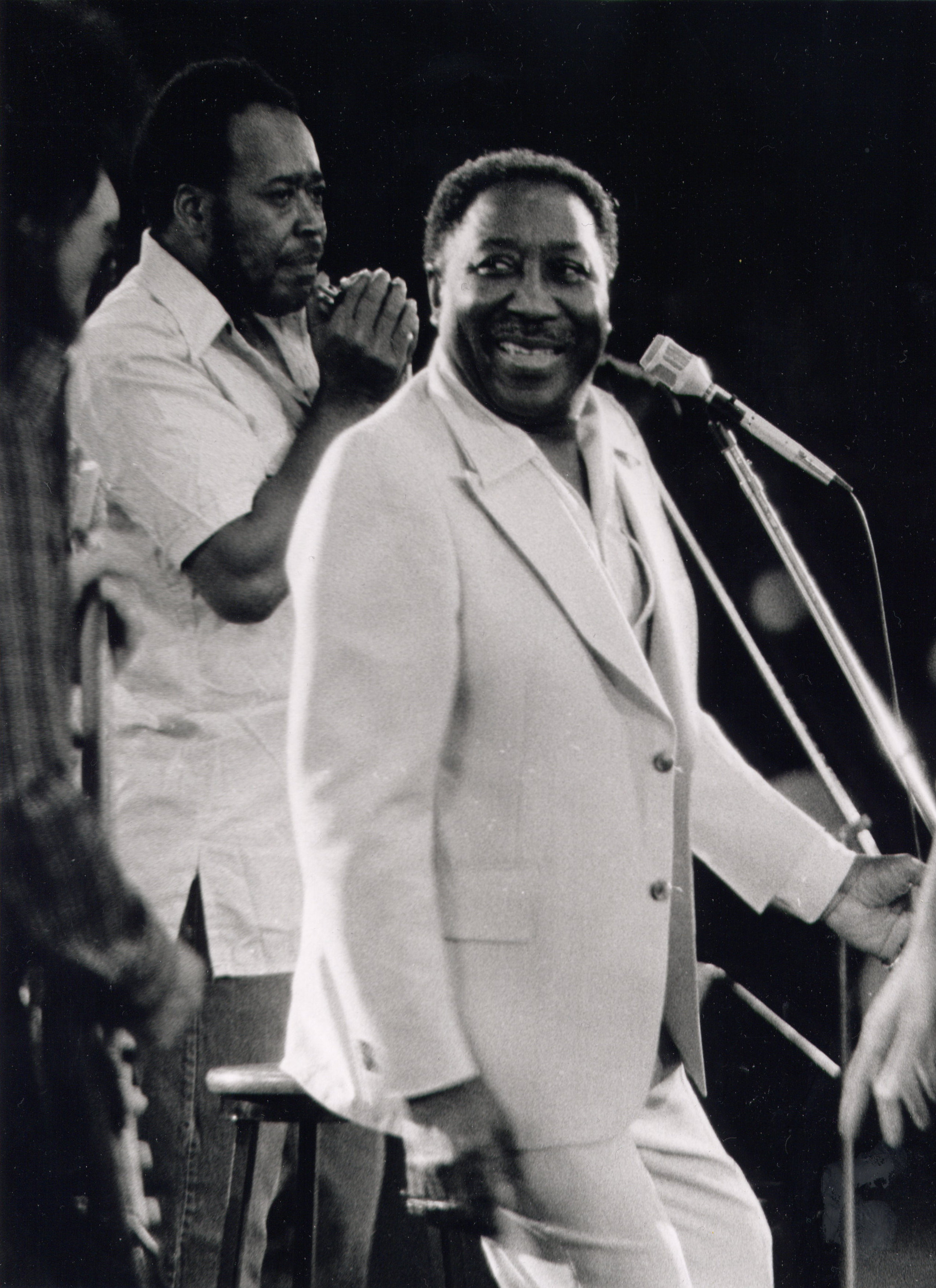
Muddy Waters with James Cotton, 1978

In 1971, Chess recorded a show at Mister Kelly's, an upscale Chicago nightclub. The album signaled Muddy's return to form and cemented his appeal with white audiences.

In 1972, he won his first Grammy Award, for Best Ethnic or Traditional Recording for They Call Me Muddy Waters, a 1971 album of old but previously unreleased recordings.

Later in 1972, he flew to England to record the album The London Muddy Waters Sessions. The album was a follow-up to the previous year's The London Howlin' Wolf Sessions. Both albums were the brainchild of Chess Records producer Norman Dayron, and were intended to showcase Chicago blues musicians playing with the younger British rock musicians whom they had inspired. He brought with him two American musicians, harmonica player Carey Bell and guitarist Sammy Lawhorn. The British and Irish musicians who played on the album included Rory Gallagher, Steve Winwood, Rick Grech, and Mitch Mitchell. Muddy was dissatisfied by the results, due to the British musicians' more rock-oriented sound. "These boys are top musicians. They can play with me, put the book before 'em and play it, you know," he told Guralnick. "But that ain't what I need to sell my people. It ain't the Muddy Waters sound. An' if you change my sound, then you gonna change the whole man." He stated, "My blues look so simple, so easy to do, but it's not. They say my blues is the hardest blues in the world to play." Nevertheless, the album won another Grammy, again for Best Ethnic or Traditional Recording.

He won another Grammy for his last LP on Chess, The Muddy Waters Woodstock Album, recorded in 1975 with a new band, guitarist Bob Margolin; pianist Pinetop Perkins and Paul Butterfield on harmonica with Levon Helm and Garth Hudson of the Band on drums, organ, accordion and saxophone. In November 1976, he appeared as a featured special guest at the Band's Last Waltz farewell concert, and in the subsequent 1978 feature film documentary of the event.

He performed at the Montreux Jazz Festival in 1972, 1974 and 1977. An album, CD, and streaming release featuring many of his best known songs from these performances was compiled in 2021 as Muddy Waters: The Montreux Years. In 1974, his backing musicians in Montreux included Buddy Guy, Pinetop Perkins, Junior Wells, and Rolling Stones bassist Bill Wyman. Wyman and Perkins also performed with him in 1977.

From 1977 to 1981, blues musician Johnny Winter, who idolized Muddy since childhood and who had become a friend, produced four albums for him, all on the Blue Sky Records label: the studio albums Hard Again (1977), I'm Ready (1978) and King Bee (1981), and the live album, Muddy "Mississippi" Waters – Live (1979). The albums were critical and commercial successes, with all but King Bee winning a Grammy. Hard Again has been especially praised by critics, who have tended to describe it as his comeback album.

In 1981, he was invited to perform at Chicago Fest, the city's top outdoor music festival. He was joined onstage by Johnny Winter and Buddy Miles, and played classics like "Mannish Boy", "Trouble No More", and "Mojo Working" to a new generation of fans. Shout! Factory made the performances available on DVD in 2009. On November 22, he performed live with three members of the Rolling Stones (Mick Jagger, Keith Richards and Ronnie Wood) at the Checkerboard Lounge, a blues club in Bronzeville, on the South Side of Chicago, which Buddy Guy and L.C. Thurman opened in 1972. A DVD of the performance, Live at the Checkerboard Lounge, Chicago 1981, was released in 2012.

In 1982, he cut way back on performing due to declining health. His last public performance took place when he sat in with Eric Clapton's band at a concert in Florida in the summer of 1982.

== Personal life, death and estate ==
Muddy Waters was married to his first wife, Mabel Berry, from 1932 to 1935.

His second wife, whom he married in the 1940s, Geneva Wade, died of cancer on March 15, 1973. Gaining custody of three of his children, Joseph, Renee, and Rosalind, Muddy Waters moved them into his home, eventually buying a new house in Westmont, Illinois. In 1977, he met Marva Jean Brooks, whom he nicknamed "Sunshine", at a Florida hotel; Eric Clapton served as best man at their wedding in 1979.

He had at least six children, including non-marital children.

Two of his sons Larry "Mud" Morganfield and Big Bill Morganfield are also blues singers and musicians. In 2017, his youngest son, Joseph "Mojo" Morganfield, began publicly performing the blues, and played occasionally with his brothers; he died in 2020 at the age of 56.

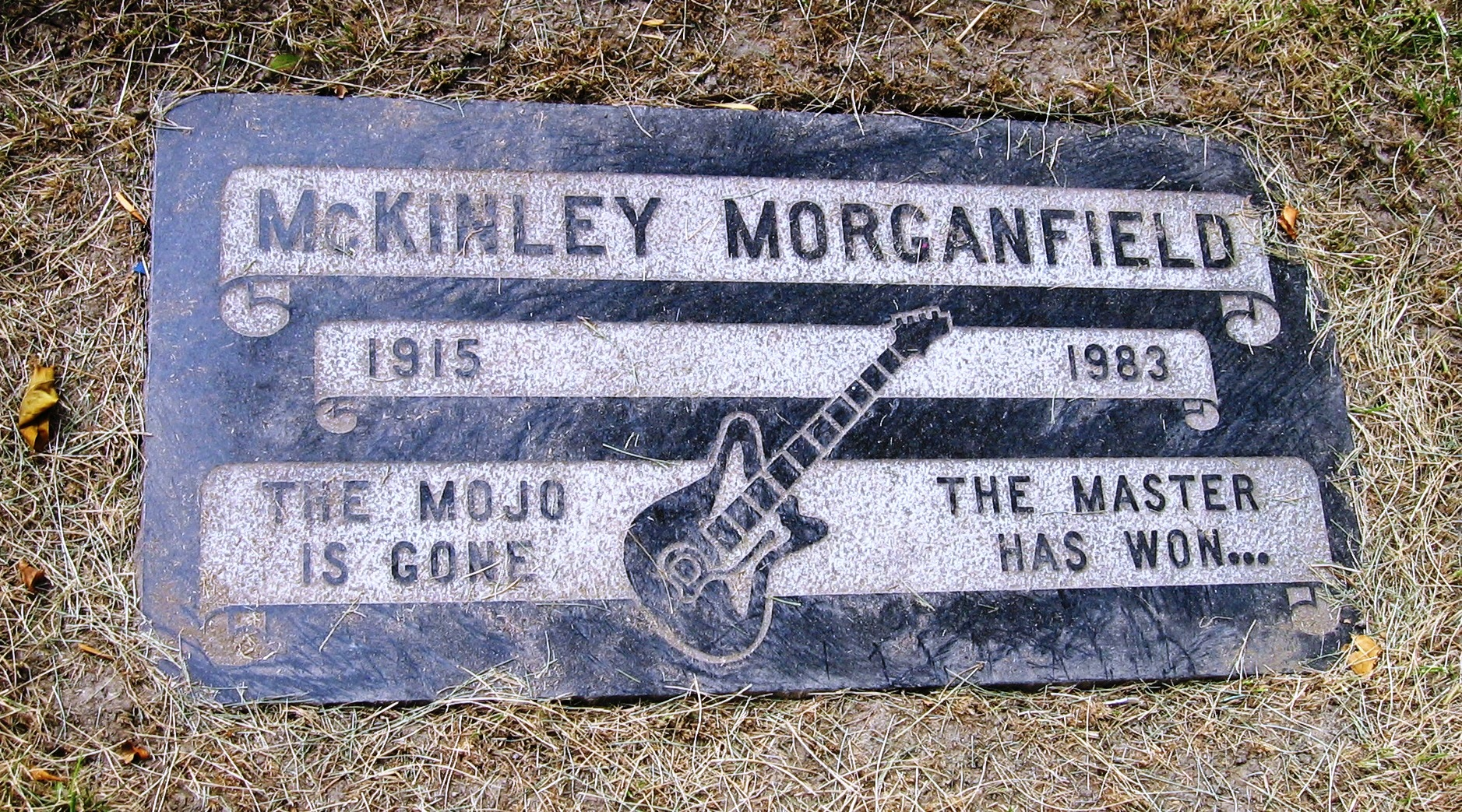
The cemetery plot of Waters under his real name, McKinley Morganfield, in Restvale Cemetery, Alsip, Illinois

Muddy Waters died in his sleep at his home in Westmont, Illinois, on April 30, 1983, from heart failure and cancer-related complications, aged 70. He was taken from his Westmont home, where he lived for the last decade of his life, to Good Samaritan Hospital in Downers Grove, Illinois, where he was pronounced dead. His funeral was held on May 4, 1983. Throngs of blues musicians and fans attended his funeral at Restvale Cemetery in Alsip, Illinois. He is buried next to his wife, Geneva.

After his death, a decades-long court battle ensued between his heirs and Scott Cameron, his manager at the time. In 2010, his heirs were petitioning the courts to appoint Mercy Morganfield, his daughter, as administrator who would then control the assets of his estate which were mainly copyrights to his music. The petition to reopen the estate was successful. Following Cameron's death, the heirs' lawyers, in May 2018, sought to hold Scott Cameron's wife in contempt for allegedly diverting royalty income. The heirs, however, asked for that citation not to be pursued. The last court date was held on July 10, 2018, and, as of 2023, the disputed arrangement remained unchanged.

== Legacy ==
Two years after his death, the city of Chicago paid tribute to him by designating the one-block section between 900 and 1000 East 43rd Street near his former home on the south side "Honorary Muddy Waters Drive". In 2017, a ten-stories mural commissioned as a part of the Chicago Blues Festival and designed by Brazilian artist Eduardo Kobra was painted on the side of the building at 17 North State Street, at the corner of State and Washington Streets. The Chicago suburb of Westmont, where he lived the last decade of his life, named a section of Cass Avenue near his home "Honorary Muddy Waters Way".

In 2008, the Mississippi Blues Commission marked the site of his cabin with a marker as part of the Mississippi Blues Trail in Clarksdale, Mississippi. He also received a plaque on the Clarksdale Walk of Fame.

Muddy Waters' Chicago Home in the Kenwood neighborhood is in the process of being named a Chicago Landmark.

A crater on Mercury was named in his honor in 2016 by the IAU.

In 2023, Rolling Stone ranked him at number 72 on its list of the 200 Greatest Singers of All Time.

== Influence ==
The British band The Rolling Stones named themselves after Muddy Waters' 1950 song "Rollin' Stone". Jimi Hendrix recalled that "I first heard him as a little boy and it scared me to death". Eric Clapton was a big fan of Muddy Waters growing up and his band Cream covered "Rollin' and Tumblin'" on their 1966 debut album, Fresh Cream. Canned Heat also covered the song at the Monterey Pop Festival and later Bob Dylan played it on his album Modern Times. Many bands recorded "Hoochie Coochie Man" including The Allman Brothers Band, Humble Pie, Steppenwolf, Supertramp and Fear. The Led Zeppelin hit "Whole Lotta Love has lyrics and a melody heavily influenced by the Muddy Waters hit "You Need Love" (written by Willie Dixon). Angus Young has cited Muddy as an influences and the AC/DC song "You Shook Me All Night Long" came from lyrics of his song "You Shook Me", written by Dixon and J. B. Lenoir.

In 1981, ZZ Top guitarist Billy Gibbons went to visit the Delta Blues Museum in Clarksdale with The Blues magazine founder, Jim O'Neal. The museum's director, Sid Graves, brought Gibbons to visit Muddy's original house, and encouraged him to pick up a piece of scrap lumber that was originally part of the roof. Gibbons eventually converted the wood into a guitar. Named Muddywood, the instrument is now exhibited at the Delta Blues Museum in Clarksdale. In 1993, Paul Rodgers released the album Muddy Water Blues: A Tribute to Muddy Waters, on which he covered a number of his songs, including "Louisiana Blues", "Rollin' Stone", "Hoochie Coochie Man" and "I'm Ready" in collaboration with guitarists Gary Moore, Brian May and Jeff Beck.

Following Muddy's death, fellow blues musician B.B. King told Guitar World, "It's going to be years and years before most people realize how greatly he contributed to American music." The bluesman John Hammond told Guitar World, "Muddy was a master of just the right notes. It was profound guitar playing, deep and simple ... more country blues transposed to the electric guitar, the kind of playing that enhanced the lyrics, gave profundity to the words themselves."

In 2003, Rolling Stone included The Anthology: 1947-1972 on its list of greatest albums. They ranked him 17th on their list of the greatest artists of all time. Gibbons wrote:

It was all supposed to be disposable. Just noise on a shellac disc. And here we are in the 21st century still trying to figure out how such a simple art form could be so complicated and subtle. It's still firing brain synapses around the world. You've got the Japanese Muddy Waters Society corresponding with fans in Sweden and England, and his music can still propel a party in the U.S. He made three chords sound deep, and they are.

== In film ==
Muddy Waters' songs have been featured in long-time fan Martin Scorsese's movies, including The Color of Money, Goodfellas, and Casino. A 1970s recording of "Mannish Boy" was used in Goodfellas, Better Off Dead, Risky Business, and the rockumentary The Last Waltz. In 1988 "Mannish Boy" was also used in a Levi's 501 commercial and re-released in Europe as a single with "Hoochie Coochie Man" on the flip side.

Waters is a central character in the 2008 American biographical drama film Cadillac Records. The role of Muddy Waters is played by Jeffrey Wright. Wright recorded "(I'm Your) Hoochie Coochie Man" for the movie soundtrack.

== Awards and recognition ==
Grammy Awards

Muddy Waters Grammy Award History
Year	Category	Title	Genre	Label	Result
1972	Best Ethnic or Traditional Folk Recording	They Call Me Muddy Waters	folk	MCA/Chess	winner
1973	Best Ethnic or Traditional Folk Recording	The London Muddy Waters Sessions	folk	MCA/Chess	winner
1975	Best Ethnic or Traditional Folk Recording	The Muddy Waters Woodstock Album	folk	MCA/Chess	winner
1978	Best Ethnic or Traditional Folk Recording	Hard Again	folk	Blue Sky	winner
1979	Best Ethnic or Traditional Folk Recording	I'm Ready	folk	Blue Sky	winner
1980	Best Ethnic or Traditional Folk Recording	Muddy "Mississippi" Waters – Live	folk	Blue Sky	winner

Rock and Roll Hall of Fame

The Rock and Roll Hall of Fame listed four songs of Muddy Waters among the 500 Songs That Shaped Rock and Roll.

Year recorded	Title
1950	"Rollin' Stone"
1954	"Hoochie Coochie Man"
1955	"Mannish Boy"
1957	"Got My Mojo Working"

Blues Foundation Awards

Muddy Waters: Blues Music Awards
Year	Category	Title	Result
1994	Reissue Album of the Year	The Complete Plantation Recordings	Winner
1995	Reissue Album of the Year	One More Mile (Chess Collectibles, Vol. 1)	Winner
2000	Traditional Blues Album of the Year	The Lost Tapes (Recorded Live 1971)	Winner
2002	Historical Blues Album of the Year	Fathers and Sons	Winner
2006	Historical Album of the Year	Hoochie Coochie Man: Complete Chess Recordings, Volume 2 (1952–1958)	Winner

Inductions

Year Inducted	Title
1980	Blues Foundation Hall of Fame
1987	Rock and Roll Hall of Fame
1992	Grammy Lifetime Achievement Award

U.S. postage stamp

Year	Stamp	USA	Note
1994	29-cent commemorative stamp	U.S. Postal Service	Photo

== Discography ==
Studio albums

- Muddy Waters Sings "Big Bill" (Chess, 1960)
- Folk Singer (Chess, 1964)
- Muddy, Brass & the Blues (Chess, 1966)
- Electric Mud (Cadet, 1968)
- After the Rain (Cadet, 1969)
- Fathers and Sons (Chess, 1969)
- The London Muddy Waters Sessions (Chess, 1972)
- Can't Get No Grindin' (Chess, 1973)
- Mud in Your Ear (Muse, 1973)
- London Revisited (Chess, 1974) split album with Howlin' Wolf
- "Unk" in Funk (Chess, 1974)
- The Muddy Waters Woodstock Album (Chess, 1975)
- Hard Again (Blue Sky, 1977)
- I'm Ready (Blue Sky, 1978)
- King Bee (Blue Sky, 1981)

== See also ==
- The Essential Collection
