= Leroy Foster (musician) =

American blues singer, drummer and guitarist (1923–1958)

- Also known as: Baby Face Leroy, Baby Face
- Born: February 1, 1923; Algoma, Mississippi, U.S.
- Died: May 26, 1958 (aged 35) Chicago, Illinois, U.S.
- Genres: Blues
- Occupation: Musician
- Instruments: Vocals, guitar, drums
- Years active: 1946–1958

"Baby Face" Leroy Foster (February 1, 1923 – May 26, 1958) was an American blues singer, drummer and guitarist, active in Chicago from the mid-1940s until the late 1950s. He was a significant figure in the development of the postwar electric Chicago blues sound, particularly as a member of the Muddy Waters band during its early years.

== Early life ==
Foster was born in Algoma southwest of Tupelo, Mississippi. He moved to Chicago in the mid-1940s. By 1946 was working with the pianist Sunnyland Slim and the harmonica player John Lee "Sonny Boy" Williamson. He was introduced to the singer and guitarist Muddy Waters by an acquaintance Waters met at a recording session in 1946. Foster was soon playing guitar and drums in Waters's band, along with Jimmy Rogers, a guitarist and harmonica player. Calling themselves the Headhunters, the trio was known for going from club to club and “cutting” (i.e. engaging in musical duels with) other bands. Little Walter later joined the band on harmonica.

== First recordings ==
Foster's first recordings were made, as a sideman, with the pianist Lee Brown in 1945 for J. Mayo Williams' Chicago label. In 1946, he took part in another session with Brown; the same year he also recorded for Columbia Records backing James "Beale Street" Clark and Waters, although only the sides by Clark were issued at the time. He accompanied Sunnyland Slim on a 1947 or 1948 session for the Opera label. Further recordings were released, under his own name for Aristocrat Records and J.O.B. Records and also backing Sunnyland Slim, Waters, Little Walter, and the pianist Johnny Jones before his most notable session, for the Parkway label in 1950.

== The Parkway session ==
The Parkway session featured the personnel of Waters' band at the time: Foster, Waters, Little Walter and (on two tracks only since he was late for the session) Jimmy Rogers. Four singles were released from the session, two by Foster and two by Little Walter. One of the singles, the two-part "Rollin' and Tumblin'", was notable enough to be reviewed (unusually for a down-home blues release) in the Chicago Defender by Edward Myers. He described it as having "the sound and beat of African chant". The track featured only Foster's drumming and singing, Walter's harmonica, and Waters's slide guitar with hummed ensemble vocals on one side. Unfortunately, Waters' guitar playing and backup singing were distinctive enough for the record to come to the attention of Leonard Chess of Chess Records, who had Waters under an exclusive recording contract. As a result, Waters was made to record his own version of the song for the larger Chess label to "kill" the Parkway recording.

== Later career and death ==
After signing with Parkway, Foster left Waters's band, possibly in the hope of a solo career resulting from the Parkway releases, but the label soon folded. Foster recorded two further sessions for J.O.B. in 1951 and 1952; only the first of these resulted in the release of a single.

Foster died of a heart attack in Chicago in 1958, at the age of 35; alcoholism may have been a factor leading to his early death. He was buried at Fern Oak Cemetery in Griffith adjacent to Gary, Indiana. In 2012 the Killer Blues Headstone Project, a nonprofit organization, placed a headstone on Foster's unmarked grave. As of 1973, there was only one known photograph of Foster.

== Influences and performing style ==
Foster sang in a style which was influenced by Sonny Boy Williamson and Doctor Clayton. While he played guitar and drums competently, the talents for which he was popular have been described as "drinking, singing and clowning".

== Discography ==
=== As leader ===
- "Locked Out Boogie" / "Shady Grove Blues" (1948), Aristocrat 1234
- "My Head Can't Rest Anymore" / "Take a Little Walk with Me" (1949), J.O.B. 100
- "Boll Weevil" / "Red Headed Woman" (1950), Parkway 104
- "Rollin' and Tumblin' part 1" / "Rollin' and Tumblin' part 2" (1950), Parkway 501
- "Pet Rabbit" / "Louella" (1951) J.O.B. 1002
