= Elga Edmonds =

American drummer

Elga Speed Edmonds (June 22, 1909 – August 26, 1966), sometimes mistakenly credited as Elgin Evans in early record discographies although he never used that name himself, was an American blues drummer. He was the drummer in Muddy Waters' band during its most successful period, and played with other leading blues musicians in the 1940s and 1950s.

He was born in Urbana, Illinois, and played washboard in local blues bands before moving in the 1930s to Chicago, where he performed in clubs. Muddy Waters had used various drummers including Baby Face Leroy in his bands, but in 1950 established a permanent band with Edmonds as drummer. Edmonds made early recordings with Jimmy Rogers, Leroy Foster, Floyd Jones and others, and beginning on July 11, 1951, appeared on most of Muddy Waters' recordings until being replaced by Fred Below in c. early 1955.

Edmonds died in 1966 aged 57. His final recording session was made in December 1965, backing guitarist/mandolinist Johnny "Man" Young.
