= Rollin' and Tumblin' =

Blues standard popularized by Muddy Waters

"Roll and Tumble Blues"
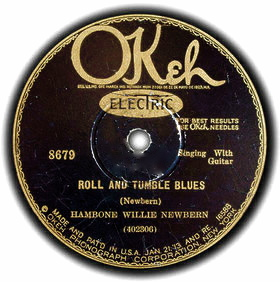

Single by Hambone Willie Newbern
- Released: 1929
- Recorded: March 14, 1929, Atlanta, Georgia
- Genre: Blues
- Length: 3:03
- Label: Okeh
- Songwriter: Unknown (Newbern credited on single)

"Rollin' and Tumblin'" (or "Roll and Tumble Blues") is a blues standard first recorded by American singer-guitarist Hambone Willie Newbern in 1929. Called a "great Delta blues classic", it has been interpreted by hundreds of Delta and Chicago blues artists, including well-known recordings by Muddy Waters. Rock musicians usually follow Waters' versions, with the 1960s group Cream's rendition being perhaps the best known.

== Original song ==
Hambone Willie Newbern recorded "Roll and Tumble Blues" on March 14, 1929, in Atlanta, Georgia for Okeh Records. It shares several elements of "Minglewood Blues", first recorded in 1928 by Gus Cannon's Jug Stompers. Newbern's "Roll and Tumble Blues" is a solo piece with his vocal and slide-guitar accompaniment.

The song is performed in the key of A using an open tuning and an irregular number of bars with an additional bar and a half at the end of each phrase. The tempo varies from an initial 140 beats per minute to a final 158 bpm. A key feature of the song is that the first verse begins on the IV chord, rather than on the more usual I chord (e.g., in the key of A this would be the D chord rather than the A chord). After the first two measures the IV chord resolves to the I chord. Often the IV chord moves to IV♭7 on the second measure or the last two beats of the second measure.

The lyrics follow a standard blues AAB pattern and relate a failed relationship:

And I rolled and I tumbled and I cried the whole night long (2×)
And I rose this mornin' mama and I didn't know right from wrong ...
And I fold my arms lord and I walked away (2×)
Said "that's all right sweet mama your trouble gon' come some day"

"Roll and Tumble Blues" is one of six songs Newbern recorded during his only recording session. It was released before the advent of race records charts, however, it soon became "an oft-covered standard" and Newbern's best-known song. In 1929, Okeh Records issued the song on a 78 rpm record, backed with "Nobody Knows What the Good Deacon Says".

== Renditions ==
=== Robert Johnson ===
Robert Johnson adapted "Rollin' and Tumblin'" with the title "If I Had Possession Over Judgment Day" during his third recording session in San Antonio, Texas, in 1936. Musically, his version is based on the original, but added new lyrics: "where Newbern sang about love, Robert sang about sex and power, combining his own fears of them with the fantasy of controlling them", according to biographers. The song was not released until 1961, when it was included on the first Johnson compilation album, King of the Delta Blues Singers. He also based his "Traveling Riverside Blues" on Newbern's song.

=== Chicago blues ===
In 1950, Muddy Waters recorded two early versions of "Rollin' and Tumblin'". On a session for the Parkway label, he provided the guitar with Little Walter on vocal and harmonica and Baby Face Leroy Foster on drums. Biographer Robert Gordon described the performance as a "standout track [which] could have easily have disintegrated into an overenthused party record". Parkway Records released the song as a two-part single (Part 1 backed with Part 2) and listed the artist as the Baby Face Leroy Trio. In 2022, this recording was inducted into the Blues Hall of Fame in the "Classics of Blues Recording – Singles" category.

For Aristocrat Records, Waters sang as well as played guitar with bass accompaniment by Ernest "Big" Crawford. Gordon called their version "exciting", but felt that it did not have the power or passion of the one with Walter and Foster. In 1960, Elmore James recorded a different arrangement of the song and a year later, Howlin' Wolf recorded "Down in the Bottom", which employed a new set of lyrics and is credited to Willie Dixon.

=== Rock adaptations ===
Cream's "Rollin' and Tumblin'"
Studio version sample from Fresh Cream

Blues historian Edward Komara notes that subsequent versions by rock groups are based on the Muddy Waters versions, with the one recorded by Cream for their debut album, Fresh Cream (1966) as "perhaps the best known". A recording from May 1968 is included on Live Cream (1970), which is described in an album review as a "searing, rollicking high energy rendition". As another noteworthy rendition, Komara includes the Yardbirds' tribute "Drinking Muddy Water" and notes singer Keith Relf's harmonica playing on the Little Games studio version and Jimmy Page's slide guitar solos on the live version that first appeared on Live Yardbirds: Featuring Jimmy Page (1971) (released by Page in 2017 as Yardbirds '68). Versions of "Rollin' and Tumblin'" by Canned Heat and Johnny Winter reached the extended singles charts and were included on their debut albums, Canned Heat (1967) and The Progressive Blues Experiment (1968).
