= Forty Days and Forty Nights =

Blues song first recorded by Muddy Waters in 1956

Single by Muddy Waters
- B-side: "All Aboard"
- Released: April 7, 1956
- Recorded: Chicago, January 1956
- Genre: Blues
- Length: 2:51
- Label: Chess
- Songwriter: Bernard Roth
- Producers: Leonard Chess, Phil Chess

Muddy Waters singles chronology
"Trouble No More" (1955)	"Forty Days and Forty Nights" (1956)	"Don't Go No Farther" (1956)

"Forty Days and Forty Nights" is a blues song recorded by Muddy Waters in 1956. Called "a big, bold record", it spent six weeks in the Billboard R&B chart, where it reached number seven. "Forty Days and Forty Nights" has been interpreted and recorded by a variety of artists.

== Composition and recording ==
"Forty Days and Forty Nights" is a midtempo blues song with an irregular number of bars written by Bernard Roth (who also wrote Muddy Waters' "Just to Be with You"). An early review in Billboard magazine described it as "a dramatic piece of material with effective lyrics".

Forty days and forty nights, since my baby left this town
Sun shinin' all day long, but the rain keep falling down
She's my life I need her so, why she left I just don't know

The song was recorded in January 1956 for Chess Records in Chicago during guitarist Pat Hare's first recording session with Waters. Biographer Robert Gordon writes, "Hare's crunching power chords rippled with distortion that was well suited for blues in the rock and roll explosion". In addition to Muddy Waters on vocals and Hare on guitar are Little Walter on harmonica, Willie Dixon on bass, possibly Fred Below or Francis Clay on drums, and Jimmy Rogers or Hubert Sumlin on second guitar.

== Releases ==
The song was one of Waters' last charting singles and appears on several of his compilation albums, including the 1965 album The Real Folk Blues. He later recorded "Forty Days and Forty Nights" for the 1969 Fathers and Sons album and the Authorized Bootleg: Live at the Fillmore Auditorium November 4–6, 1966 album released in 2009.
