= Ernest "Big" Crawford =

American blues double bassist (1897–1956)

Ernest "Big" Crawford (July 31, 1897 – March, 1956, Memphis, Tennessee) was an American blues double bassist. He played with Muddy Waters, Sunnyland Slim, Little Walter, Memphis Minnie, Jimmy Rogers, Big Maceo, Big Bill Broonzy, Washboard Sam, Memphis Slim, and Mahalia Jackson.

In 2015, the Killer Blues Headstone Project placed a headstone for Ernest Crawford at Fern Oak Cemetery in Griffith, Indiana.

== Discography ==
With Muddy Waters

- The Real Folk Blues (Chess, 1948–54, [1966])
- More Real Folk Blues (Chess, 1950-53 [1967])
