= Rollin' Stone (Muddy Waters song) =

Song first recorded by Muddy Waters in 1950

Single by Muddy Waters
- B-side: "Walkin' Blues"
- Released: 1950
- Recorded: February 1950
- Genre: Blues, electric blues
- Length: 3:05
- Label: Chess
- Songwriter: Muddy Waters (credited)
- Producers: Leonard Chess, Phil Chess

Muddy Waters singles chronology
"Rollin' and Tumblin'" (1950)	"Rollin' Stone" (1950)	"You're Gonna Need My Help I Said" (1950)

"Rollin' Stone" is a blues song recorded by Muddy Waters in 1950. It is his interpretation of "Catfish Blues", a Delta blues that dates back to 1920s Mississippi. "Still a Fool", recorded by Muddy Waters a year later using the same arrangement and melody, reached number nine on the Billboard R&B chart. "Rollin' Stone" has been recorded by a variety of artists.

== Earlier songs ==
In 1928, Jim Jackson recorded "Kansas City Blues Parts 3 and 4", a follow-up to his highly successful "Jim Jackson's Kansas City Blues Parts 1 and 2". Jackson's lyrics included:

I wished I was a catfish swimming down in the sea
I'd have some good woman fishing after me

Several other early songs also explored variations on the catfish and/or fishing theme. In 1941, Tommy McClennan and his sometime partner Robert Petway each recorded versions of the song. Petway's was the first to be titled "Catfish Blues" and is sometimes cited as the basis for Muddy Waters' "Rollin' Stone". However, according to one biographer, "They'd been singing 'Catfish Blues' for years in the Delta, but it never sounded like 'Rollin' Stone'.

== Muddy Waters song ==
"Rollin' Stone" has been identified (along with "Walkin' Blues", the single's B-side) as one of the first songs that Muddy Waters learned to play and an early favorite. The words refer to the traditional proverb, "A rolling stone gathers no moss".

Called "a brooding, minor-hued drone piece", "Rollin' Stone" is a mid- to slow-tempo blues notated in 4/4 time in the key of E major. Although the instrumental section uses the IV and V chords, the vocal sections remain on the I chord, giving the song a modal quality often found in Delta blues songs. In addition to the traditional catfish verses, Waters added:

Well my mother told my father just before I was born
'I got a boy child comin', gonna be, gonna be a rollin' stone
Sho' enough he's a rollin' stone

Unlike most of his early recordings which have bass or other instrumental accompaniment, "Rollin' Stone" is a solo performance by Muddy Waters on vocal and electric guitar. It has "much empty space ... imbued with the power of a pause, of letting a note hang in the air, the anticipation of the next one".

"Rollin' Stone" was the first Muddy Waters record released on Chess Records and the second overall for the label (previous releases were on Aristocrat Records). It did not reach the national record charts, but sold about 70,000 copies and allowed Muddy Waters to quit his day job.

== Still a Fool ==
In 1951, Muddy Waters used the vocal melody and guitar figure from "Rollin' Stone" for "Still a Fool". The song was more successful, reaching number nine in the Billboard R&B chart. Rather than a solo piece, Little Walter on second guitar and Leonard Chess on bass drum accompanied Muddy on vocal and guitar. Subsequent versions of "Rollin' Stone" or "Catfish Blues" often use some lyrics from "Still a Fool" (sometimes called "Two Trains Running" after the opening verse).

== Influence and recognition ==
According to music writer Robert F. Palmer, English blues rock group the Rolling Stones (who recorded their version of the song on their 2023 album Hackney Diamonds as "Rolling Stone Blues") and the music magazine Rolling Stone took their names from the song. Moreover, magazine editor Jann Wenner explained:

The name of it [the magazine] is Rolling Stone, which comes from an old saying: 'A Rolling Stone gathers no moss.' Muddy Waters used the name for a song he wrote; The Rolling Stones took their name from Muddy’s song, and 'Like A Rolling Stone' was the title of Bob Dylan’s first rock and roll record.

In 2000, the song was honored with a Grammy Hall of Fame Award; in 2004, it was included at number 459 by Rolling Stone in its list of the "500 Greatest Songs of All Time". It was updated to number 465 in 2010. In 2019, the Blues Foundation inducted "Rollin' Stone" into the Blues Hall of Fame as a "Classic of Blues Recording".

In 1967, "Rollin' Stone" (and "Still a Fool") was used as part of Jimi Hendrix's "Catfish Blues", an homage to Muddy Waters, and included on the albums BBC Sessions and Blues. Hendrix's signature songs "Voodoo Chile" and "Voodoo Child (Slight Return)" evolved from his "Catfish Blues".

Frank Zappa recorded a version of the song at the Record Plant in 1970. The vocals were later wiped and the backing track was then re-utilized to create the song "Stink-Foot" on Apostrophe (') (1974). A rough mix of the original version was posthumously released in 2023 on Funky Nothingness.
