= Sunnyland Slim =

American blues pianist and singer (1906–1995)

- Born: Albert Luandrew; September 5, 1906; Near Vance, Mississippi, U.S.
- Died: March 17, 1995 (aged 88) Chicago, Illinois, U.S.
- Genre: Blues
- Occupations: Musician; singer; songwriter
- Instrument: Piano
- Years active: 1920s–1990s
- Labels: Hy-Tone; Aristocrat; RCA Victor; 77; Blue Horizon

Albert Luandrew (September 5, 1906 – March 17, 1995), known as Sunnyland Slim, was an American blues pianist born in the Mississippi Delta and moved to Chicago, helping to make that city a center of postwar blues.

Chicago broadcaster and writer Studs Terkel said Sunnyland Slim was "a living piece of our folk history, gallantly and eloquently carrying on in the old tradition".

== Biography ==
Sunnyland Slim was born on a farm in Quitman County, Mississippi, near the unincorporated settlement of Vance. He moved to Memphis, Tennessee, in 1925, where he performed with many of the popular blues musicians of the day. His stage name came from the song "Sunnyland Train", about a railroad line between Memphis and St. Louis, Missouri. In 1942 he moved to Chicago, in the great migration of southern workers to the industrial north.

At that time the electric blues was taking shape in Chicago, and through the years Sunnyland Slim played with such musicians as Muddy Waters, Howlin' Wolf, Robert Lockwood Jr., and Little Walter. His piano style is characterised by heavy basses or vamping chords with the left hand and tremolos with the right. His voice was loud, and he sang in a declamatory style.

Sunnyland Slim's first recording was as a singer with Armand "Jump" Jackson's band for Specialty Records in September 1946. His first recordings as a leader were for Hy-Tone Records and Aristocrat Records in late 1947. He continued performing until his death, in 1995.

He released one record for RCA Victor, "Illinois Central" backed with "Sweet Lucy Blues" (Victor 20–2733), under the name Dr. Clayton's Buddy.

In the late 1960s, Slim became friends with members of the band Canned Heat and played piano on the track "Turpentine Moan" on their album Boogie with Canned Heat. In turn, members of the band—lead guitarist Henry Vestine, slide guitarist Alan Wilson and bassist Larry Taylor—contributed to Sunnyland Slim's Liberty Records album Slim's Got His Thing Goin' On (1969), which also featured Mick Taylor.

He was a recipient of a 1988 National Heritage Fellowship awarded by the National Endowment for the Arts, which is the United States government's highest honor in the folk and traditional arts.

He died in March 1995 in Chicago, after complications from renal failure, at the age of 88.

== Discography ==
NB. Sunnyland Slim recorded on many different record labels over his lengthy career. Some of these titles were issued, and re-issued, at various dates and on other labels.

Year	Title	Collaboration (and notes)	Record label
1961	Slim's Shout		Bluesville
1964	Portraits In Blues Vol. 8		Storyville
1964	Chicago Blues Session	Little Brother Montgomery	77
1965	American Folk Blues	Hubert Sumlin, Clifton James and Willie Dixon, later reissued as Blues Anytime! on L+R, Evidence Music and others	Amiga
1969	Midnight Jump		Blue Horizon
1969	Slim's Got His Thing Goin' On		World Pacific
1970	Pearl Harbour Blues	Doctor Clayton & His Buddy (=Sunnyland Slim)	RCA International (Camden)
1971	Depression Blues		Festival
1972	Sad and Lonesome		Jewel
1973	Plays Ragtime Blues		BluesWay
1974	Worried About My Baby		Black & Blue
1974	The Legacy Of The Blues Vol. 11		Sonet
1974	She Got That Jive		Airway
1975	Depression Blues		Disques Festival
1976	Sunnyland Slim's Blues Jam With Delta Blues Band	The Delta Blues Band	Storyville
1979	Patience Like Job		Airway
1981	Just You And Me		Airway
1981	Old Friends	David "Honeyboy" Edwards, Kansas City Red, Big Walter Horton, Floyd Jones	Earwig
1983	Sunnyland Train	(Reissued on Evidence Music in 1995)	Red Beans
1984	Travelin'		Black & Blue
1985	Chicago Jump	(Sunnyland Slim Blues Band, Reissued in 1995 by Evidence Music)	Red Beans
1989	Be Careful How You Vote		Earwig
1991	Live in Europe		Airway
1992	House Rent Party	(Previously unissued recordings recorded in 1949)	Delmark
1994	Decoration Day		Evidence Music
1994	Live at the D.C. Blues Society	(recorded in 1987)	Mapleshade
1997	Bad and Lonesome		Jewel
1998	She Got a Thing Goin' On	(recorded 1971 – 1983)	Earwig / Blind Pig
1999	Smile on My Face	(recorded 1977)	Delmark
2006	Blues Legends Live	John Dee Holeman	Mapleshade
2010	ABC of the Blues Vol. 42	Johnny Shines	Documents
2012	Legendary Bop Rhythm & Blues Classics		Essential Media Group
2012	The Devil Is a Busy Man		Essential Media Group

With Howlin' Wolf

- Live and Cookin' (Chess, 1972)
