= Aristocrat Records =

American record label (1947–1951)

- Founded: 1947
- Founder: Charles Aron; Evelyn Aron; Fred Brount; Mildred Brount; Art Spiegel
- Defunct: 1951
- Status: Defunct
- Genre: Blues, jazz
- Country of origin: U.S.

Aristocrat Records, sometimes billed as the Aristocrat of Records, was founded in April 1947 by Charles and Evelyn Aron, together with their partners Fred and Mildred Brount and Art Spiegel. By September, Leonard Chess had invested in the young record company. Over time, Leonard bought the others out, and by 1948, only he and Evelyn Aron ran the firm. By early 1950, Leonard and his brother Phil had become the sole owners, and in June of that year they changed the company's name from Aristocrat to Chess Records. The Aristocrat brand was officially discontinued in January 1951.

In three years, Aristocrat released 183 songs, and recorded 18 more that were later released under the new Chess label.

On August 27, 1947, Muddy Waters made his first recordings for Aristocrat, which produced the single "Gypsy Woman" b/w "Little Anna Mae". Backing him were bassist Ernest "Big" Crawford and pianist Sunnyland Slim. After a second session in December 1947, Aristocrat released "I Can't Be Satisfied" b/w "Feel Like Goin' Home," which became a minor hit.

== See also ==
- List of record labels
