= Promised Land (Robert Walker album) =

Studio album by Robert Walker
- Released: 1997
- Genre: Blues
- Length: 56:35
- Label: Rooster Blues
- Producer: Robert Walker; Jim O'Neal; Patty Johnson

Robert Walker chronology
Promised Land (1997)	Rompin' & Stompin' (1998)

Professional ratings
Review scores
Source	Rating
AllMusic	4/5 stars
The Penguin Guide to Blues Recordings	4/4 stars

Promised Land is the first solo studio album released by American blues guitarist Robert Walker after over 50 years of performing. The album was released in 1997 by Rooster Blues. It contains only one original song written by Walker, with the rest being treatments of standards from a wide range of styles.

== Track listing ==
1. "Goin' to the Train Station" (Cooke) — 6:01
2. "Please Love Me" (B. B. King) — 4:05
3. "Just a Country Boy" (Walker) — 7:04
4. "Promised Land" (Berry) — 3:43
5. "You Took My Love " (John) — 5:52
6. "Still a Fool" (Waters) — 3:47
7. "The Wild Side of Life/It Wasn't God Who Made Honky Tonk Angels" (Carter, Warren, Miller) — 1:55
8. "Everything Gonna Be Alright" (Magic Sam) — 4:40
9. "Baby, Baby, Baby" (Cooke) — 2:12
10. "How Much More/Mama Talk to Your Daughter" (Lenoir) — 3:32
11. "Better Lovin' Man" (Axton) — 4:39
12. "Hold That Train, Conductor" (Clayton) — 3:55
13. "Got My Mojo Working" (Foster) — 4:16
14. "Berry Pickin'" (Berry) — 2:52

== Personnel ==
Performers:

- Robert Walker — guitar, arranger, vocals, producer
- Sam Carr — drums
- Frank Frost - organ

Production:

- Spencer Diablo — digital editing
- Brent Endres — mixing
- Duncan Hudson — engineer, mixing
- Patty Johnson, Jim O'Neal — producer, mixing
- Susan Bauer Lee, Selina O'Neal — cover design
- Bill Steber — photography

== Reception ==
AllMusic says that this album has "no real weak cuts" with "a good number of true gems" but mentions that the audio recorded is subpar for the studio. The Penguin Guide to Blues Recordings, however, warms to the audio, equating it to "the sweaty vigour of a juke-join Saturday night." According to reviewer Chris Smith, between this and Rock the Night, Promised Land "has the edge, but only just."
