= Shoot That Thang =

Studio album by Super Chikan
- Released: 2001
- Recorded: 2000
- Genre: Blues
- Label: Rooster Blues

Super Chikan chronology
What You See (2000)	Shoot That Thang (2001)	Chikan Supe (2005)

Shoot That Thang is an album by the American musician Super Chikan, released in 2001. The title comes from a phrase shouted by Super Chikan during his concerts. He supported the album with a North American tour, backed by his band, the Fighting Cocks.

== Production ==
Super Chikan decided in 2000 to concentrate on music full time; the album was recorded between July and September of that year. The booklet contains a comic by Harvey Pekar. Super Chikan constructed his guitars from crushed gas cans that he would paint. "Tin Top Shack" looks back on Super Chikan's youth. "Mennonite Blues" recalls Super Chikan's time driving tractors for a Mennonite community.

== Critical reception ==
Professional ratings
Review scores
Source	Rating
AllMusic	2.5/5 stars
The Penguin Guide to Blues Recordings	3.5/4 stars
Pittsburgh Post-Gazette	3/4 stars

JazzTimes wrote that Super Chikan "imbues unique songs like 'Bus-Train-Rain', 'Mennonite Blues', 'Junky Trunk', 'Wrong to Sing the Blues' and 'Staingy wid It' with a playful, down-home sense of humor, and he tends to go for the wah-wah pedal a lot on his solos." The Toronto Star called Shoot That Thang "full of ranting vocals, playful to heart- rending lyrics, cleanly picked guitar and rumbling keyboard harmonies."

The Philadelphia Inquirer determined that Super Chikan and his band "cook up a stew with an irresistibly greasy flavor that isn't always limited to the blues." The Pittsburgh Post-Gazette considered the album "tough, aggressive Delta blues, filtered through ... urban sensibilities and electric talents." The Star Tribune noted that it features "some of the finest roots songwriting of our day—hilarious, poignant and memorable."

AllMusic deemed the album "agreeable, laid-back, funky Mississippi blues."

== Track listing ==
No.	Title	Length
1.	"Guilty Man"
2.	"Don't Mess with the Blues"
3.	"Tin Top Shack"
4.	"Mennonite Blues"
5.	"Bus-Train-Rain"
6.	"Staingy wid It"
7.	"Could Have Been Me"
8.	"Junky Trunk"
9.	"Marry Me"
10.	"Wrong to Sing the Blues"
11.	"Shoot That Thang!"
