= Alabama Blues Project =

American non-profit organization

The Alabama Blues Project (ABP) is a non-profit organization whose mission is to preserve and promote the heritage of blues music in the US state of Alabama.

== History ==
The ABP was founded in 1995 as an unincorporated business by two Tuscaloosa-based blues musicians, Debbie Bond and Michael McCracken. Their first project was to produce a CD titled Moody Swamp Blues, the first recording of regional blues veterans Little Whitt and Big Bo. The release of the CD was followed by a European tour in the spring of that same year.

In 1998, the ABP established its first blues education program in Tuscaloosa County. This was an after-school program that provided hands-on music training to underserved “at-risk” students aged 8–18. Initially, the ABP partnered with the Kentuck Arts Association and later with the Boys and Girls Club of Tuscaloosa.

By 2000, McCracken was no longer working with the project and Bond, working with University of Alabama law professor, blues fan and storyteller Dr. Steven Hobbs, started the process of building a board of directors and turning the ABP into a non-profit organization. The ABP was incorporated in 2001 and was officially granted non-profit status in 2002.

== Non-profit work ==
Since its inception, the ABP offices were located at Bond’s home, assisted by volunteers and occasionally part-time paid workers. This continued as the ABP embraced its new, non-profit status and as the blues camp program outgrew the small premises at the Boys and Girls Club. The ABP partnered with Tuscaloosa organizations to find suitable premises for their programs, especially Covenant Presbyterian and First United Methodist Church of Tuscaloosa. At the same time, the organization’s budget expanded with grants from the National Endowment for the Arts and increased support from local businesses and individuals. To help fund activities, an annual fund raiser was held in Tuscaloosa. By 2013, the Summer Blues Camp was in its 16th season. The ABP also runs "Advanced Band", an after-school band for middle and high-school students.

The ABP has gained international recognition and accolades from many national arts educators. In 2003, the ABP received the prestigious presidential Coming Up Taller award from the President's Committee on the Arts and Humanities given to outstanding after-school programs that teach at-risk students through the arts. Other awards include the Blues Foundation's Keeping the Blues Alive award, and two Druid Arts awards.

The ABP’s education programs and advocacy have received considerable media attention, including coverage in Southern Living, the NEA Arts magazine, AAA Travel, and Oxford American, to name a few. The ABP has become a major resource for consulting on all things Alabama blues. It has consulted and facilitated musician appearances in numerous documentaries and films, including the John Sayles’ movie Honeydripper, the World Films documentary about the life of bluesman Willie King, Down in the Woods, the Martin Scorsese documentary Feel Like Goin’ Home, and the Robert Clem documentary Alabama Blackbelt Blues.

In 2011, Bond and Asherson retired from the ABP to pursue full-time music careers. Currently the ABP is headed by Executive Director Ashley R. Wheat.
