= Rock the Night =

Rock the Night is a title used for various releases by the hard rock band Europe:

- "Rock the Night" (song) - single released from the album The Final Countdown
- Rock the Night: The Very Best of Europe - "Greatest Hits" CD
- Rock the Night: Collectors Edition - DVD that includes music videos and live footage

== Other uses ==
- Rock the Night (Robert Walker album), the first live album by American blues guitarist Robert Walker
