= Vietnam Blues: The Complete L + R Recordings =

Compilation album by J. B. Lenoir
- Released: 1995
- Recorded: 1965, 1966
- Genre: Blues
- Label: Evidence
- Producer: Horst Lippmann, Jerry Gordon

J. B. Lenoir chronology
Mama Watch Your Daughter (1993)	Vietnam Blues: The Complete L + R Recordings (1995)	Follow Your Heart (1995)

Vietnam Blues: The Complete L + R Recordings is a compilation album by the American musician J. B. Lenoir, released in 1995. It includes Alabama Blues, from 1965, and Down in Mississippi, from 1966. Lenoir supported those albums by touring with the American Folk Blues Festival. Vietnam Blues was nominated for a W. C. Handy Award for best reissue album.

== Production ==
The album was produced by Horst Lippmann and Jerry Gordon, with the recording sessions supervised by Willie Dixon. All of the album's songs were written by Lenoir, with 21 of the 24 performed as solo pieces. They were recorded in 1965 and 1966. Lenoir was influenced primarily by Blind Lemon Jefferson and Chicago blues. He took inspiration from the civil rights struggles of the mid-1960s, although he also wanted to continue to sing more lighthearted material. He dubbed his musical style "African hunch". Fred Below played drums on some of the tracks. "Tax Payin' Blues" is a reworking of Lenoir's "Eisenhower Blues". "Born Dead" and "Down in Mississippi" are about the hardships experienced by Black people in Mississippi, and the desire to move north. The title track compares the plight of Black soldiers in Vietnam with Southern Black citizens. "Good Advice" is a tribute to Lenoir's grandmother.

== Critical reception ==
Professional ratings
Review scores
Source	Rating
All Music Guide to the Blues	5/5 stars
The Encyclopedia of Popular Music	4/5 stars
The Indianapolis Star	3/4 stars
MusicHound Blues: The Essential Album Guide	5/5 stars
The Penguin Guide to Blues Recordings	4/4 stars
Pittsburgh Post-Gazette	3/4 stars
The Star-Ledger	4/4 stars

The Indianapolis Star praised Lenoir's "high energy level" and command of "social blues". Guitar Player said that "there's much to admire in his innovative chords, rumbling bass boogies, potent jabs, jangling leads, and unforgettable compositions."

The Penguin Guide to Blues Recordings included the album in its "core" blues collection, noting that "no blues singer has ever done anything quite like it". Rough Guides included it in the book Blues: 100 Essentials CDs.

== Legacy ==
Bonnie Raitt frequently covered "Round and Round" in concert. Wim Wenders, in his film for The Blues series, The Soul of a Man, focused on Lenoir, with "Alabama Blues" and "Voodoo Music" among the songs featured on the soundtrack; Cassandra Wilson also covered the title track.

== Track listing ==
No.	Title	Length
1.	"Alabama"
2.	"Mojo Boogie"
3.	"God's Word"
4.	"The Whale Has Swallowed Me"
5.	"Move This Rope"
6.	"I Feel So Good"
7.	"Alabama March"
8.	"Talk to Your Daughter"
9.	"Mississippi Road"
10.	"Good Advice"
11.	"Vietnam"
12.	"I Want to Go"
13.	"Down in Mississippi"
14.	"Slow Down Woman"
15.	"If I Get Lucky"
16.	"Shot on James Meredith"
17.	"Round and Round"
18.	"Voodoo Music"
19.	"Born Dead"
20.	"Leavin' Here"
21.	"Vietnam Blues"
22.	"How Much More"
23.	"Tax Payin' Blues"
24.	"Feelin' Good"
