= Edward A. Grouby Jr. =

American politician (1927–2020)

Edward Arthur Grouby Jr.

Member of the Alabama House of Representatives from the 71st district
- In office 1983–1990
- Preceded by: Joe R. Carothers Jr.
- Succeeded by: Horace W. Powell

Member of the Alabama House of Representatives from the 82nd district
- In office 1978–1983
- Preceded by: James J. Plaster
- Succeeded by: Thomas Reed

Personal details
- Born: November 22, 1927
- Died: January 2, 2020 (aged 92) Prattville, Alabama
- Party: Democratic
- Spouse: Frances Beck
- Children: Edward Arthur Grouby III; Cindy Grouby Key; Robert Keith Grouby; Kenneth Lee Grouby; James Edward Grouby
- Parents: Edward Arthur Grouby Sr. (father); Rose Saunders (mother)
- Education: Troy State University; University of Alabama

Edward Arthur Grouby Jr. (November 22, 1927 – January 2, 2020) was an American politician from the state of Alabama.

== Personal life ==
Edward Jr was born on November 22, 1927. He was the son of judge and state representative Edward Arthur Grouby Sr. and Rose Saunders Grouby. He graduated from Troy State University, and attended the University of Alabama for graduate school. He was a lieutenant commander in the U.S. Navy, and after retiring from the Navy he joined the family business, Grouby Furniture Company. Edward Jr died on January 2, 2020. He was 92 years old.

== Political career ==
He served in the Alabama House of Representatives from 1978 to 1990, losing renomination in 1990.

== Electoral history ==
1990 Alabama 71st District State Representative Democratic Primary Runoff

Horace W. Powell (D) 52.0%
Edward A. Grouby Jr. (D) (inc.) 48.0%

1990 Alabama 71st District State Representative Democratic Primary

Horace W. Powell (D) 45.2%
Edward A. Grouby Jr. (D) (inc.) 41.4%
Ray Watson (D) 13.4%

1990 Alabama 71st District State Representative Democratic Primary Runoff (result thrown out)

Horace W. Powell (D) 50.1%
Edward A. Grouby Jr. (D) (inc.) 49.9%

1990 Alabama 71st District State Representative Democratic Primary (result thrown out)

Edward A. Grouby Jr. (D) (inc.) 42.3%
Horace W. Powell (D) 28.6%
Ray Watson (D) 16.6%
Gene Hall (D) 12.5%

1986 Alabama 71st District State Representative General Election

Edward A. Grouby Jr. (D) (inc.) 66.0%
Frank Thiemong (R) 34.0%

1986 Alabama 71st District State Representative Democratic Primary

Edward A. Grouby Jr. (D) (inc.) 72.7%
Ballard B. Wainwright (D) 27.3%

1983 Alabama 71st District State Representative General Election

Edward A. Grouby Jr. (D) (inc.) 49.2%
Jack Crawford (I) 24.3%
Paul McNeese (R) 21.6%
Mack M. Wainwright Jr. (I) 5.3%

1982 Alabama 82nd District State Representative General Election

Edward A. Grouby Jr. (D) (inc.) 100.0%

1982 Alabama 82nd District State Representative Democratic Primary

Edward A. Grouby Jr. (D) (inc.) 50.5%
Phillip Wood (D) 32.3%
William T. Carter (D) 17.2%

1978 Alabama 82nd District State Representative General Election

Edward A. Grouby Jr. (D) 100.0%

1978 Alabama 82nd District State Representative Democratic Primary

Edward A. Grouby Jr. (D) 54.4%
James J. Plaster (D) (inc.) 45.6%
