= Eastwood After Hours: Live at Carnegie Hall =

Live album by Clint Eastwood and The Carnegie Hall Jazz Band
- Released: April 29, 1997
- Recorded: October 17, 1996
- Venue: Carnegie Hall
- Genre: Jazz
- Length: 60:14
- Label: Warner Bros.
- Producers: Phil Ramone, Clint Eastwood, Bruce Ricker

Eastwood After Hours: Live at Carnegie Hall is a two-disc live album by American actor Clint Eastwood and various jazz musicians. Released on April 29, 1997, by Warner Bros. Records, it compiles material from Eastwood's film scores—including Play Misty for Me (1971), Honkytonk Man (1982), Bird (1988), Thelonious Monk: Straight, No Chaser (1988), and White Hunter Black Heart (1990)—performed by some of the most reputable practitioners of jazz. Issued five months after the concert, Eastwood After Hours coincided with celebrations for Eastwood's contributions to jazz, and was overseen by producer Bruce Ricker.

Well received upon release, Eastwood After Hours is recognized by music critics as a successful representation of Eastwood's cultural legacy. An accompanying foreword by Eastwood, rare archival photographs, film clips, and commentary documenting Eastwood's film career are featured on the two-disc set.

== Background ==
A prolific film actor and director, often recognized for his roles as The Man with No Name in the Dollars Trilogy and Harry Callahan in the Dirty Harry film series, Clint Eastwood employed jazz early on in his cinematic career by incorporating jazz instrumentation in his various film scores. Eastwood practiced as a boogie-woogie pianist with ambitions of pursuing a music career; his musical influences include Thelonious Monk, Oscar Peterson, Dave Brubeck, and Fats Waller. Although he later decided on a career in film, in 1959 Eastwood recorded Cowboy Favorites, an album of country songs that helped promote the television series Rawhide, co-starring Eastwood.

Eastwood's interest in jazz music proved a strong influence on his filming career, first with his decision to employ jazz composers for his second major American motion picture, Coogan's Bluff (1968). By 1971, the commercial success of Eastwood's film directing debut, Play Misty for Me, helped re-popularize Erroll Garner's song "Misty" which Eastwood positioned as a key element in the film. His verve for music flowed innately throughout his career—from performing in Honkytonk Man (1982), directing Bird (1988), and producing Thelonious Monk: Straight, No Chaser (1990). Prior to his tribute at Carnegie Hall, Eastwood established his own jazz label called Malpaso Records which debuted with the soundtrack of his latest film The Bridges of Madison County (1995).

== Performance ==
Eastwood After Hours was recorded at Carnegie Hall in New York City on October 17, 1996. The Carnegie Hall Jazz Band, a string section, and several reputable figures of jazz were assembled for the occasion to perform songs from soundtracks of Eastwood's extensive filmography. Among the musicians present were pianists Kenny Barron and Barry Harris, saxophonists Joshua Redman and Charles McPherson, violinist Claude "Fiddler" Williams, and trumpeters Jon Faddis and Roy Hargrove, among others. The set's most ambitious piece was "Eastwood: After Hours Suite", a medley featuring piano choruses played by Eastwood himself before transitioning into instrumentals by most of the aforementioned musicians. At the conclusion of the concert, Eastwood makes a light-hearted, but revealing, statement about his passion for jazz: "I found out it was a good way to get along in society if you could sit down and play a number or two. I worked at it for a while, but I didn't really work at it as rigorously, and I got sidetracked and became an actor, so it kind of ruined my whole career".

== Release and reception ==
Eastwood After Hours was released by Warner Bros. Records on April 29, 1997. Along with a foreword by Eastwood, the two-disc set includes archival photographs, various clips from his films, and commentary that reflects on the actor's career; the collection was produced by filmmaker Bruce Ricker, a collaborator on the Eastwood-sponsored Thelonious Monk documentary.

A critical success upon release, Eastwood After Hours received positive reviews from critics, many of whom praised it as an appropriate tribute to Eastwood's wide-reaching cultural legacy. Critic Ed Gonzalez of Slant called the album a "classy, no frills presentation" and praised Ricker's ability to record the spontaneity of the concert: "Sound is key here and the disc's mono soundtrack surprisingly captures the full-range of the night's many performances". Writing for JazzTimes magazine, Josef Woodard thought Eastwood was deserving of a tribute for his "musical integrity". He also remarked the album was "a ripe excuse to toast American musical diversity".

== Track listing ==
=== Disc one ===
1. "Misty" – 4:08
2. "The First Time Ever I Saw Your Face" – 5:00
3. "This Time the Dream's on Me" – 4:45
4. "Hootie's Blues" – 4:05
5. "San Antonio Rose" – 3:20
6. "Satin Doll" – 4:53
7. "Doe Eyes /Jitterbug Waltz" – 2:47
8. "Take Five" – 2:16
9. "Claudia's Theme" – 2:05
10. "Tightrope" (Main Theme) – 4:53
11. "The Good, the Bad and the Ugly / Rawhide" – 1:26
12. "Misty" – 4:07
13. "Straight No Chaser / Now's the Time" – 7:29

=== Disc two ===
1. "Straight No Chaser" – 3:08
2. "'Round Midnight" – 2:47
3. "I See Your Face Before Me" – 3:35
4. "Cherokee" – 3:02
5. "Laura" – 4:33
6. "I Didn't Know What Time It Was" – 3:32
7. "Parker's Mood" – 4:22
8. "These Foolish Things (Remind Me of You)" – 4:01
9. "Lester Leaps In" – 11:17
10. "After Hours / C. E. Blues" – 9:09
