= Robert Walker (musician) =

American blues musician (1937–2017)

- Also known as: Bilbo; Little Junior Bilbo
- Born: Robert Walker Jr. February 19, 1937; Clarksdale, Mississippi, U.S.
- Died: November 29, 2017 (aged 80) California, U.S.
- Genres: Blues
- Occupation: Musician
- Instrument: Guitar
- Years active: 1970s–2017
- Labels: Rooster Blues

Robert "Bilbo" Walker Jr. (February 19, 1937 – November 29, 2017) was an American blues musician, who is known in the blues music world due to his "rock 'n' roll showmanship" and "flamboyant Chuck Berry imitations."

== Biography ==
Walker was born near Clarksdale, Mississippi. Walker Sr. was often referred to by his nickname, "Bilbo", which was passed on to Walker Jr., who was sometimes called "Little Junior Bilbo". Walker began to explore music after being introduced to Ike Turner.

After spending 17 years in Chicago, Illinois, with his friend David Porter, Walker moved to the area around Bakersfield, California, and started a farm growing such commodities as watermelon and cotton. During this time, he continued to perform at local bars in the California area, as well as in Chicago and Clarksdale when on visits.

In 1997, Walker released his first album, Promised Land, and followed it with two more records, 1998's Rompin' & Stompin' and 2001's Rock the Night. He appeared in the 2015 documentary film, I Am the Blues.

Walker died of cancer in California at the age of 80. In 2018 the Killer Blues Headstone Project placed a headstone for Robert Walker at Oakridge Cemetery in Clarksdale, Mississippi.

== Discography ==
- 1997: Promised Land – Rooster Blues
- 1998: Rompin' & Stompin' – Fedora Records
- 2001: Rock the Night – Rooster Blues
