= Gary D. Roach =

American film editor

- Born: February 5, 1964 (age 62)
- Occupation: Film editor

Gary D. Roach (born February 5, 1964), sometimes credited as Gary Roach, is an American film editor. He is best known for collaborating with Clint Eastwood on 12 films.

== Life and career ==
Roach began his career in 1996 as an apprentice film editor on Clint Eastwood's Absolute Power. On Eastwood's next film, Midnight in the Garden of Good and Evil (1997), Roach was an assistant editor and became part of Eastwood's regular editing crew alongside Joel Cox. Roach went on to receive assistant editor credits on Eastwood's subsequent films True Crime, Space Cowboys, Blood Work, Mystic River, Million Dollar Baby, and Flags of Our Fathers. Non-Eastwood assistant editor credits include Catwoman (2004). His first co-editor credit came with the Eastwood-directed Piano Blues segment of Martin Scorsese's The Blues film documentary series in 2003. Roach continued editing other documentaries, such as The Music Never Ends (2007). Roach's first film editor credit was on 2006's Letters from Iwo Jima, which he shared with Joel Cox. His first solo film editor credit was on Rails & Ties for Alison Eastwood in 2007. In 2008, Roach shared editor credit with Joel Cox on Eastwood's Changeling and Gran Torino. He and Joel Cox received a nomination for the 2009 BAFTA Award for Best Editing for Changeling and for the 2015 Academy Award for Best Film Editing for American Sniper.

== Filmography ==
=== Editor ===
Year	Film	Director	Notes
2024	Arthur the King	Simon Cellan Jones	
2017	Wind River	Taylor Sheridan	
2014	American Sniper	Clint Eastwood	
2013	Prisoners	Denis Villeneuve	
2012	J. Edgar	Clint Eastwood	as Gary D. Roach
2010	Hereafter	Clint Eastwood	as Gary D. Roach
2009	Invictus	Clint Eastwood	as Gary D. Roach
2008	Gran Torino	Clint Eastwood	as Gary D. Roach
2008	Changeling	Clint Eastwood	as Gary D. Roach
2007	American Masters Tony Bennett: The Music Never Ends	Bruce Ricker	(TV); Clint Eastwood Producer
2007	Rails & Ties	Alison Eastwood	Robert Lorenz Producer
2006	Letters from Iwo Jima	Clint Eastwood	
2005	Budd Boetticher: A Man Can Do That	Bruce Ricker	(TV)

=== Editorial department ===
Year	Film	Director	Job	Notes
2006	Flags of Our Fathers	Clint Eastwood	assistant film editor	
2004	Million Dollar Baby	Clint Eastwood	assistant editor	Clint Eastwood as Frankie Dunn
2004	Catwoman	Pitof	first assistant editor	
2003	Piano Blues	Clint Eastwood	assistant editor	
2003	Mystic River	Clint Eastwood	assistant editor	Original Music by Clint Eastwood
2002	Blood Work	Clint Eastwood	assistant film editor as Gary D. Roach	Clint Eastwood as Terry McCaleb
2000	Space Cowboys	Clint Eastwood	assistant editor as Gary D. Roach	Clint Eastwood as Frank Corvin; Original Music by Clint Eastwood
1999	True Crime	Clint Eastwood	assistant film editor	Clint Eastwood as Steve Everett
1998	Monterey Jazz Festival: 40 Legendary Years	William Harper	assistant editor	video
1997	Midnight in the Garden of Good and Evil	Clint Eastwood	assistant film editor	
1997	Absolute Power	Clint Eastwood	assistant film editor	Clint Eastwood as Luther Whitney
1997	Eastwood After Hours: Live at Carnegie Hall	Bruce Ricker	assistant editor	(TV)

=== Thanks ===
Year	Show	Episode	Notes
2005		Budd Boetticher: An American Original	Video
2000	American Masters	Clint Eastwood: Out of the Shadows	

== Awards ==
Year	Result	Award	Category	Recipient(s)	Notes
2015	Nominated	Oscar	Best Film Editing	American Sniper	Shared with Joel Cox
2009	Nominated	British Academy of Film and Television Arts	BAFTA Award for Best Editing	Changeling	Shared with Joel Cox
