= George "Wild Child" Butler =

American harmonica player and singer

- Born: George Butler; October 1, 1936; Autaugaville, Alabama, United States
- Died: March 1, 2005 (aged 68); Windsor, Ontario, Canada
- Occupations: Blues harmonica player, vocalist
- Years active: 1950s–2000s

George "Wild Child" Butler (October 1, 1936 – March 1, 2005) was an American blues harmonica player, and vocalist.

== Career ==
Butler was born October 1, 1936, in Autaugaville, Alabama, and began playing blues music in bands in the late 1950s, but it was not until 1966 that he began to receive notice, after moving to Chicago and signing with Jewel Records. His early sessions were recorded with Willie Dixon, Cash McCall and Jimmy Dawkins as sidemen. He recorded an album for Mercury Records in 1969.

In 1981, Butler moved to Ontario, Canada, where he played regularly. In the 1990s, he began recording with record producer Mike Vernon in England, which resulted in two albums released on Bullseye Blues.

Butler died on March 1, 2005, in Windsor, Ontario, of a pulmonary embolism, at the age of 68.

== Discography ==
- Open Up Baby (Jewel/Charly, 1966)
- Keep On Doing What You're Doing (Mercury Records, 1969)
- Funky Butt Lover (TK Records, 1976; reissued as Lickin' Gravy by Rooster Blues)
- These Mean Old Blues (Bullseye Blues, 1992)
- Stranger (Bullseye, 1994)
- Lickin' Gravy (M.C. Records, 1998)
- The Devil Made Me Do It (Ace Records, 1999)
- Sho' Nuff (APO Records, 2001)
