= The Blues (film series) =

2003 documentary film series produced by Martin Scorsese

The Blues is a 2003 documentary film series produced by Martin Scorsese, dedicated to the history of blues music. In each of the seven episodes, a different director explores a stage in the development of the blues. The series originally aired on PBS (Public Broadcasting Service) in the United States.

== Feel Like Going Home ==
Feel Like Going Home
- Directed by: Martin Scorsese
- Written by: Peter Guralnick
- Produced by: Sam Pollard / Daphne McWilliams
- Starring: Ali Farka Touré; Corey Harris; Salif Keita; Son House; Taj Mahal; John Lee Hooker; Keb' Mo'; Willie King
- Cinematography: Arthur Jafa
- Edited by: David Tedeschi
- Release date: September 28, 2003

Director Martin Scorsese pays tribute to the Delta blues, tracing the roots of the music by traveling through the state of Mississippi with the musician Corey Harris and then traveling to West Africa. Willie King, Taj Mahal, Othar Turner and Ali Farka Touré give performances of early Delta blues songs, along with rare archival film of Son House, Muddy Waters, and John Lee Hooker.

== The Soul of a Man ==
The Soul of a Man
- Directed by: Wim Wenders
- Written by: Wim Wenders
- Produced by: Alex Gibney
- Narrated by: Laurence Fishburne
- Cinematography: Lisa Rinzler
- Edited by: Mathilde Bonnefoy
- Music by: Skip James; Blind Willie Johnson; J. B. Lenoir
- Release date: September 29, 2003

Written and directed by Wim Wenders, the film explores the musical careers of blues musicians Skip James, Blind Willie Johnson and J. B. Lenoir.

== The Road to Memphis ==
The Road to Memphis
- Directed by: Richard Pearce
- Written by: Robert Gordon
- Produced by: Robert Kenner
- Starring: B. B. King; Bobby Rush; Rosco Gordon; Ike Turner
- Cinematography: Richard Pearce
- Edited by: Charlton McMillan
- Release date: September 30, 2003

Directed by Richard Pearce, this episode focuses on the Beale Street music scene, particularly three Memphis blues musicians with different levels of acclaim: B. B. King, Rosco Gordon and Bobby Rush.

== Warming by the Devil's Fire ==
Warming by the Devil's Fire
- Directed by: Charles Burnett
- Written by: Charles Burnett
- Produced by: Margaret Bodde; Alex Gibney / Daphne McWilliams
- Starring: Tommy Hicks; Nathaniel Lee Jr.
- Cinematography: John N. Demps
- Edited by: Edwin Santiago
- Music by: Stephen James Taylor
- Release date: October 1, 2003

Written and directed by Charles Burnett, this film presents the tale of a young boy traveling to Mississippi to visit relatives. He is caught between the pressures of his religious mother and gospel music, and the eagerness of his blues-loving uncle. The film includes performance by

- Big Bill Broonzy
- Elizabeth Cotten
- Reverend Gary Davis
- Ida Cox
- Willie Dixon
- Jesse Fuller
- John Lee Hooker
- Lightnin' Hopkins
- Son House
- Mississippi John Hurt
- Vasti Jackson
- Bessie Smith
- Mamie Smith
- Victoria Spivey
- Sister Rosetta Tharpe
- Dinah Washington
- Muddy Waters
- Sonny Boy Williamson

== Godfathers and Sons ==
Godfathers and Sons
- Directed by: Marc Levin
- Produced by: Daphne Pinkerson; Marc Levin
- Starring: Marshall Chess; Chuck D
- Cinematography: Mark Benjamin
- Edited by: Bob Eisenhardt
- Release date: October 2, 2003

Director Marc Levin follows Marshall Chess as he remembers his father's contribution to Chicago blues history as the co-founder of Chess Records and his own production of the controversial album Electric Mud. He organizes a reunion of the musicians that made Electric Mud to record new versions of Muddy Waters's blues standard "Mannish Boy", with contributions by hip hop artists, including Chuck D of Public Enemy, Common & Kyle Jason.

== Red, White and Blues ==
Red, White and Blues
- Directed by: Mike Figgis
- Produced by: Louise Hammar; Shirani Sabratnam
- Cinematography: Barry Ackroyd; Mike Eley; John Lynch; Stephen Standen
- Edited by: David Martin; Nigel Karikari
- Release date: October 3, 2003

Directed by Mike Figgis, this episode is dedicated to blues culture in Britain and to the effect of the British Invasion on American blues culture. It contains footage from a jam session and interviews with the musicians Jeff Beck, Van Morrison and others.

== Piano Blues ==
Piano Blues
- Directed by: Clint Eastwood
- Written by: Peter Guralnick
- Produced by: Clint Eastwood; Bruce Ricker
- Starring: Marcia Ball; Dave Brubeck; Ray Charles; Pinetop Perkins,...
- Cinematography: Vic Losick
- Edited by: Joel Cox, Gary Roach
- Release date: October 4, 2003

Directed by Clint Eastwood, this episode is dedicated to blues music played on the piano. Eastwood, a piano player and accomplished composer, interviews such key figures as Dr. John, Ray Charles, Jay McShann (shown on the DVD cover), and Pinetop Perkins.
