= Rompin' & Stompin' =

Studio album by Robert Walker
- Released: April 14, 1998
- Recorded: November 22, 1997
- Genre: Blues
- Length: 41:28
- Label: Fedora Records
- Producer: Robert Walker

Robert Walker chronology
Promised Land (1997)	Rompin' & Stompin' (1998)	Rock the Night (2001)

Professional ratings
Review scores
Source	Rating
AllMusic	3/5 stars
The Penguin Guide to Blues Recordings	2.5/4 stars

Rompin' and Stompin' is the second studio album by American blues rock guitarist Robert Walker. It was recorded on October 22, 1997 and released on April 14, 1998 by Fedora Records. The album has been considered "congested" and with "unimaginative accompaniments" that give Walker "no room to cut up and go crazy" and that as a result, the album sounds like "any old cover band."

== Track listing ==
1. "Baby How Long" (Burnett) – 3:28
2. "Take Yo' Hand Off a Me" (Coombs) – 4:08
3. "Mustang Sally" (Rice) 4:51
4. "Cut You a Loose" (London) – 5:38
5. "Something on Your Mind" (McNeely) – 4:48
6. "Mel's Hideaway" (Walker) – 4:14
7. "Shake for Me" (Burnett) – 4:13
8. "Moanin' at Midnight" (Burnett, Howlin' Wolf) – 2:59
9. "Still a Fool" (Waters) – 3:35
10. "Mystery Train" (Parker) – 4:14

== Personnel ==
Performers:

- Jeff Henry — bass
- Chris Millar — drums, producer
- Clarence Walker — guitar
- Robert Walker — guitar, vocals

Production:

- Wendi Horowitz — design
- Mick Rainsford — liner notes
