= Super Chikan =

American blues musician

James "Super Chikan" Johnson
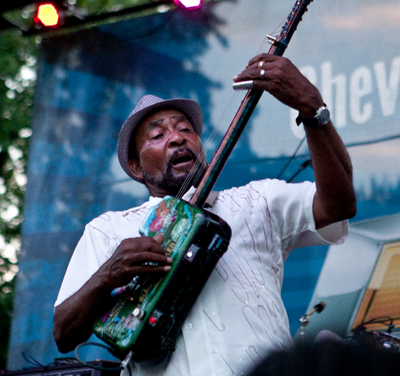
- Super Chikan at St. Louis Bluesweek 2010

Background information
- Also known as: Super Chikan
- Born: James Johnson; Darling, Mississippi, U.S.
- Genre: Blues
- Instrument: Guitar
- Labels: Rooster Blues, Ruf Records

James "Super Chikan" Johnson is an American blues musician based in Clarksdale, Mississippi. He is the nephew of fellow blues musician Big Jack Johnson.

One commentator noted that Super Chikan, Big Jack Johnson, Booba Barnes, R. L. Burnside, and Paul "Wine" Jones were "present-day exponents of an edgier, electrified version of the raw, uncut Delta blues sound."

== Early life ==
Super Chikan was born James Johnson in Darling, Mississippi. He spent his childhood moving from town to town in the Mississippi Delta and working on his family's farms. He was fond of the chickens on the farm, and before he was old enough to work in the fields, he would walk around talking to them. This led his friends to give him the nickname "Chikan Boy". At an early age, Johnson got his first rudimentary musical instrument, a diddley bow. As he grew up, he came up with new ways to improve and vary the sounds he could make with it, and in 1964, at the age of thirteen, he bought his first guitar, an acoustic model that had only two strings, from a Salvation Army store in Clarksdale.

== Career ==
As an adult, Super Chikan began driving a truck for a living. During the long stretches on the road, he began composing his own songs. When he showed some of the songs to his friends, they convinced him to go to a studio and record them. He then started playing with some renowned local musicians, but he decided he would rather perform on his own than try to conform his style to that of his bandmates. He did so, and in 1997 he released his debut album, Blues Come Home to Roost, influenced by such musicians as Muddy Waters, John Lee Hooker, and Chuck Berry. He went on to release What You See (2000), Shoot That Thang (2001), Chikan Supe (2005), and Sum Mo Chikan (2007). In the Clarksdale area, he is probably best known for performing regularly at Morgan Freeman's Ground Zero blues club and for being Freeman's favorite blues performer. He also played support to Steven Seagal's band, Thunderbox.

Super Chikan's latest release was Chikadelic, which was recorded at Stax studios in Memphis and distributed by BluesTown Records. It was recorded in Notodden, Norway's Juke Joint Studios, and was released at the 2009 Notodden Blues Festival. Super Chikan was backed by Norway's Spoonful of Blues. In 2011, he was honored with a plaque on the Clarksdale Walk of Fame.

Super Chikan is also known for making artistic, handcrafted instruments out of recycled parts and Bill Clinton and Paul Simon are among the people who have bought his guitars.

== Discography ==
- 1997 – Blues Come Home to Roost
- 2000 – What You See
- 2001 – Shoot That Thang
- 2005 – Chikan Supe
- 2007 – Sum Mo Chikan (Producers and Mixers: Charley Burch and Lawrence "Boo" Mitchell)
- 2009 – Chikadelic Winner of 2010 BMA Traditional Blues Album of The Year
- 2010 – Welcome to Sunny Bluesville
- 2011 – Okiesippi Blues – Watermelon Slim and Super Chikan (Producers and Mixers: Charley Burch and Lawrence "Boo" Mitchell)
- 2015 – Organic Chikan, Free Range Rooster (producer James Johnson)

== Awards ==
- Living Blues Critics Award (5)
- 1998 – W. C. Handy Award Nominee
- 2004 – Mississippi Governor's Award for Excellence in the Arts
- 2010 – Blues Music Award Winner, Traditional Blues Album of the Year
