= John Littlejohn =

American electric blues slide guitarist (1931–1994)

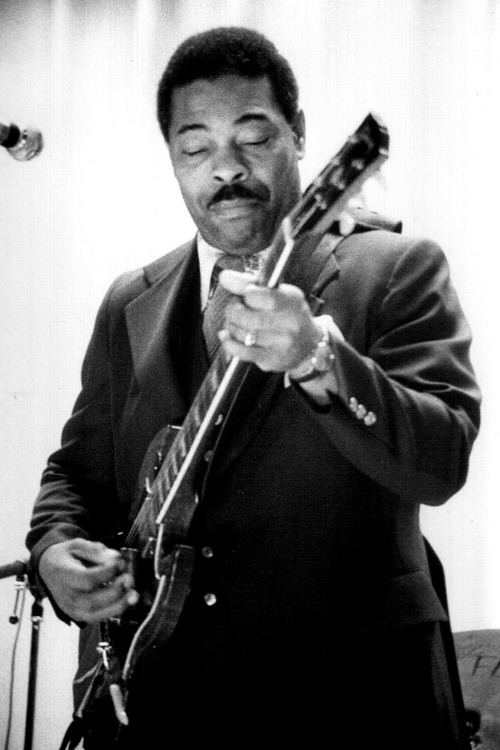
Littlejohn in 1978

John Wesley Funchess (April 16, 1931 – February 1, 1994) known professionally as John (or Johnny) Littlejohn, was an American electric blues slide guitarist. He was active on the Chicago blues circuit from the 1950s to the 1980s.

== Biography ==
Born in Lake, Mississippi, Littlejohn first learned to play the blues from Henry Martin, a friend of his father's. In 1946 he left home and traveled widely, spending time in Jackson, Mississippi; Arkansas; Rochester, New York; and Gary, Indiana. He settled in Gary in 1951, playing whenever possible in the nearby Chicago area. Through his connections in Gary, he was acquainted with Joe Jackson, the patriarch of the musical Jackson family, and Littlejohn and his band reputedly served as an occasional rehearsal band for the Jackson 5 in the mid- to late 1960s.

Littlejohn played regularly in Chicago clubs (he was filmed by drummer Sam Lay playing with Howlin' Wolf's band about 1961) but did not make any studio recordings until 1966, when he cut singles for several record labels. Later that year he recorded an album for Arhoolie Records and four songs for Chess Records. The Chess tracks were not issued at the time.

He recorded a few singles for small local labels but did not record another album until 1985, when Rooster Blues issued So-Called Friends. Soon after, he fell into ill health. He died of renal failure in Chicago, on February 1, 1994, at the age of 62.

== Discography ==
=== Albums ===
- Chicago Blues Stars (Arhoolie Records, 1969)
- Funky From Chicago (BluesWay, 1973)
- Dream (MCM, 1977)
- Sweet Little Angel (Black & Blue, 1978)
- Easy Blues (Black & Blue, 1978) with Lafayette Leake
- Blues Show! Live At The Pit Inn (P-Vine, 1982) with Carey Bell
- So-Called Friends (Rooster Blues, 1985)
- John Littlejohn's Blues Party (Wolf Records, 1989)
- When Your Best Friend Turns His Back On You (JSP Records, 1989)
- Dream (Storyville Records, 1995; recorded live in 1976)
- Sweet Little Angel (Black & Blue Records, 2006)

=== Compilation albums ===
- Slidin' (Chess Records, 1991) also features tracks by Elmore James and Hound Dog Taylor)
- Slide 'em On Down: Chicago Slide Guitar 1966-1992 (JSP, 2022) also features seven tracks by J. B. Hutto

=== Singles ===
- "Kitty O" / "Johnny's Jive" (Margaret Records, 1966)
- "What In The World (You Gonna Do)" / "Can't Be Still" (Terrell Records, 1966)
- "Father Popcorn (Just Got To Town)" (T-S-D Records, 1968; B-side: "I Am Back Home" by Bo Dud and Johnny Twist)
- "29 Ways" / "I Need Lovin'" (T-S-D Records, 1968)
- "Dream / Catfish Blues" (Joliet Records, 1968)
- "Shake Your Moneymaker" (Love Records, 1970)
- "She's 19 Years Old" / "I Wanna Go Home" (Ace Records, 1975)
- "Poor Man's Blues" (Full Scope Records, 1980)
- "Bloody Tears" / "Just Got In Town" (Weis Records)
