= Sum Mo Chikan =

Sum Mo Chikan is an album by Super Chikan, which was released in 2007. The album was produced and mixed by Lawrence "Boo" Mitchll and Charley Burch. Burch secured Super Chikan a recording contract with Vizztone Records.

== Track listing ==
1. "Freddy's Thang"
2. "Crystal Ball Eyes"
3. "Hookin' Up"
4. "Yard Boy Blues"
5. "Mexico"
6. "September Nights"
7. "Full Moon Blues"
8. "Peter Cluck"
9. "Crying About the Blues"
10. "Love Bruiser"
11. "Sippi'Seekan'Saw"
12. "Coochie Daddy"
