= These Mean Old Blues =

Studio album by George "Wild Child" Butler
- Released: 1992
- Recorded: 1991
- Genre: Blues
- Label: Bullseye Blues
- Producer: Mike Vernon

George "Wild Child" Butler chronology
Funky Butt Lover (1976)	These Mean Old Blues (1992)	Stranger (1994)

These Mean Old Blues is an album by the American musician George "Wild Child" Butler, released in 1992. He supported it with a North American tour with his backing band, the Blues Persuaders.

== Production ==
Produced by Mike Vernon, the album was recorded in England in 1991. Butler had not recorded in around 15 years. He wrote the majority of the album's songs. Butler continued to perform with his harmonica upside down, as it was how he learned to play. "It's a Pity" addresses the Gulf War. "Walkin' the Little Girl Home" was performed as a solo piece.

== Critical reception ==
Professional ratings
Review scores
Source	Rating
All Music Guide to the Blues	4/5 stars
Chicago Tribune	3/4 stars
The Grove Press Guide to the Blues on CD	3.5/5 stars
MusicHound Blues: The Essential Album Guide	2.5/5 stars
The Penguin Guide to Blues Recordings	3/4 stars
The Rolling Stone Jazz & Blues Album Guide	4/5 stars

Billboard praised the "fine rough 'n' tumble form." The Chicago Tribune said that Butler's "wailing harp and growling vocals are the real thing on the shuffling title track and the downbeat 'Crack House Woman'".

The Grove Press Guide to the Blues on CD stated that Butler "sings and plays harp with the pleasing kind of authority and scampish wit that suggests a natural raconteur." The Rolling Stone Jazz & Blues Album Guide noted that his "raspy Howlin' Wolf-style vocal on 'Crack House Woman' is the real sound of the blues."

== Track listing ==
No.	Title	Length
1.	"These Mean Old Blues"
2.	"Give Me an Answer"
3.	"Anyone Can Say They Love You"
4.	"Crack House Woman"
5.	"Walkin' the Little Girl Home"
6.	"The Devil Made Me Do It"
7.	"It's a Pity"
8.	"No One Woman's Man"
9.	"It's a Sin to Be a Thief"
10.	"My Woman's Been Misled"
11.	"(Baby) Do Your Thing"
