= Dave Brubeck: In His Own Sweet Way =

- Directed by: Bruce Ricker
- Country of origin: United States
- Original language: English

Production
- Cinematography: Kenneth Neil Moore
- Editor: Gary Roach
- Running time: 85 minutes

Original release
- Release: December 6, 2010

Dave Brubeck: In His Own Sweet Way is a 2010 documentary film about jazz pianist Dave Brubeck. It was directed and produced by Bruce Ricker with Clint Eastwood as executive producer for Turner Classic Movies (TCM) to commemorate Brubeck's 90th birthday in December 2010. It aired on his birthday, December 6, 2010.
