= Lassiter House (Autaugaville, Alabama) =

Historic house in Alabama, United States

- U.S. National Register of Historic Places
- Alabama Register of Landmarks and Heritage
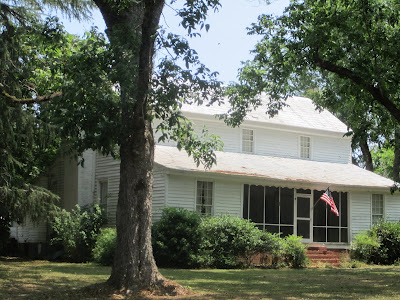
- The house in 2012.

- Location within Alabama Location within the United States
- Nearest city: Autaugaville, Alabama; United States
- Coordinates: 32°28′20″N 86°48′18″W
- Built: 1825
- Architectural style: I-house
- NRHP reference No.: 97000651

Significant dates
- Added to NRHP: July 17, 1997
- Designated ARLH: July 22, 1991

The Lassiter House, also known as the Treadwell House, is a historic residence in Autaugaville, Alabama, United States. The house was built in 1825 in the vernacular I-house style. It was listed on the National Register of Historic Places on July 17, 1997. It is also listed on the Alabama Register of Landmarks and Heritage.

== History ==
The first owners of the house are recorded to be Jeremiah and Nancy Lassiter. Nancy was born in 1799 and Jeremiah was a stockholder with the Real Estate Banking Company of South Alabama in 1838. Curiously, the original land grants signed by J.Q. Adams in 1825 are to people who are not recorded as part of the Lassiter family, that being one “Mills Harrod” and an “(unintelligible) Guff”. Nevertheless, the house was subsequently owned by Peyton and Elizabeth (Betty) Anne Whetstone, then Joseph Baker Parker, Jr. and Mary “Minnie” Anna Parker, followed by Tilly (Bates) Park, Annie Lee (Parker) and Carlton Clyde (C.C.) Jones, and finally Minnie Evelyn (Jones) and George Treadwell. As of 1988, the property is in possession of George E. Treadwell of Emory, Virginia.

== See also ==
- National Register of Historic Places listings in Autauga County, Alabama
- Properties on the Alabama Register of Landmarks and Heritage in Autauga County, Alabama
