= Fernandez Ponds =

Fernandez L. Ponds
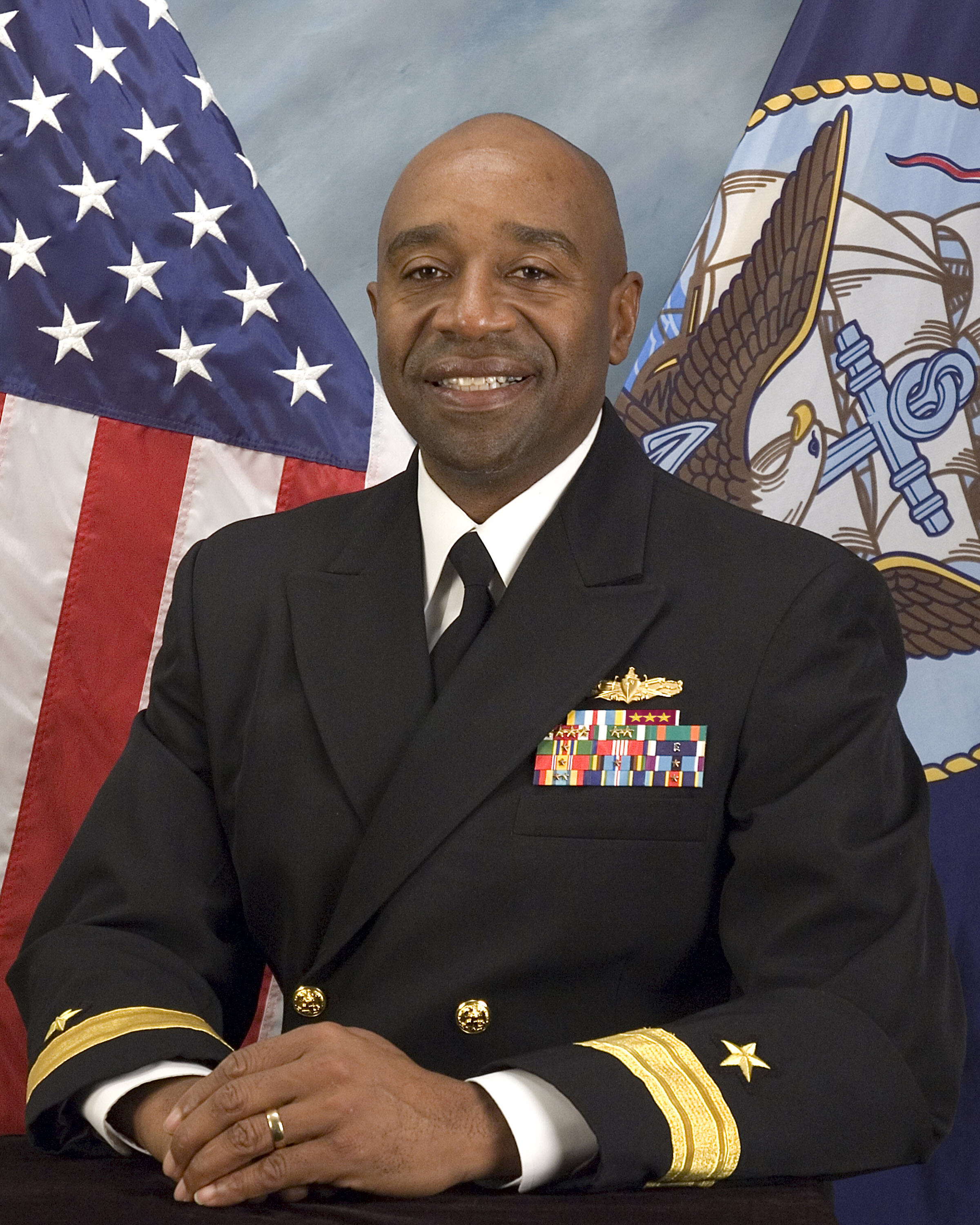
- Born: 1959 (age 66–67)
- Spouse: Carol
- Relatives: Sherese (daughter), Fernandez, Jr. (son)
- Military career
- Allegiance: United States of America
- Branch: United States Navy
- Service years: 1983–2015
- Rank: Rear admiral (lower half)
- Nickname: "Frank"
- Commands: Joint Task Force Guantanamo; Amphibious Squadron EIGHT; USS Fife
- Awards: Defense Superior Service Medal; Legion of Merit (4x); Meritorious Service Medal (5x); Navy and Marine Corps Commendation Medal (3x); Navy and Marine Corps Achievement Medal; National Defense Service Medal
- Website: https://www.linkedin.com/in/fernandez-frank-ponds-884bb01b

Fernandez Lewis "Frank" Ponds (born 1959) is a former United States Navy officer from the U.S. state of Alabama. He is the former commanding officer of the amphibious assault ship USS Kearsarge (LHD-3) and commanded the destroyer USS Fife (DD-991) in the early 2000s. He is also a former executive officer of the destroyer USS Paul F. Foster (DD-964).

== Early life and education ==
Ponds is originally from Autaugaville, Alabama and graduated from the University of Alabama in 1982 with a B.A. degree. He later earned an M.S. degree in military studies from the Marine Corps Command and Staff College, an M.S. degree in information systems technology from the George Washington University and an M.S. degree in national security strategy from the National Defense University.

== Career ==
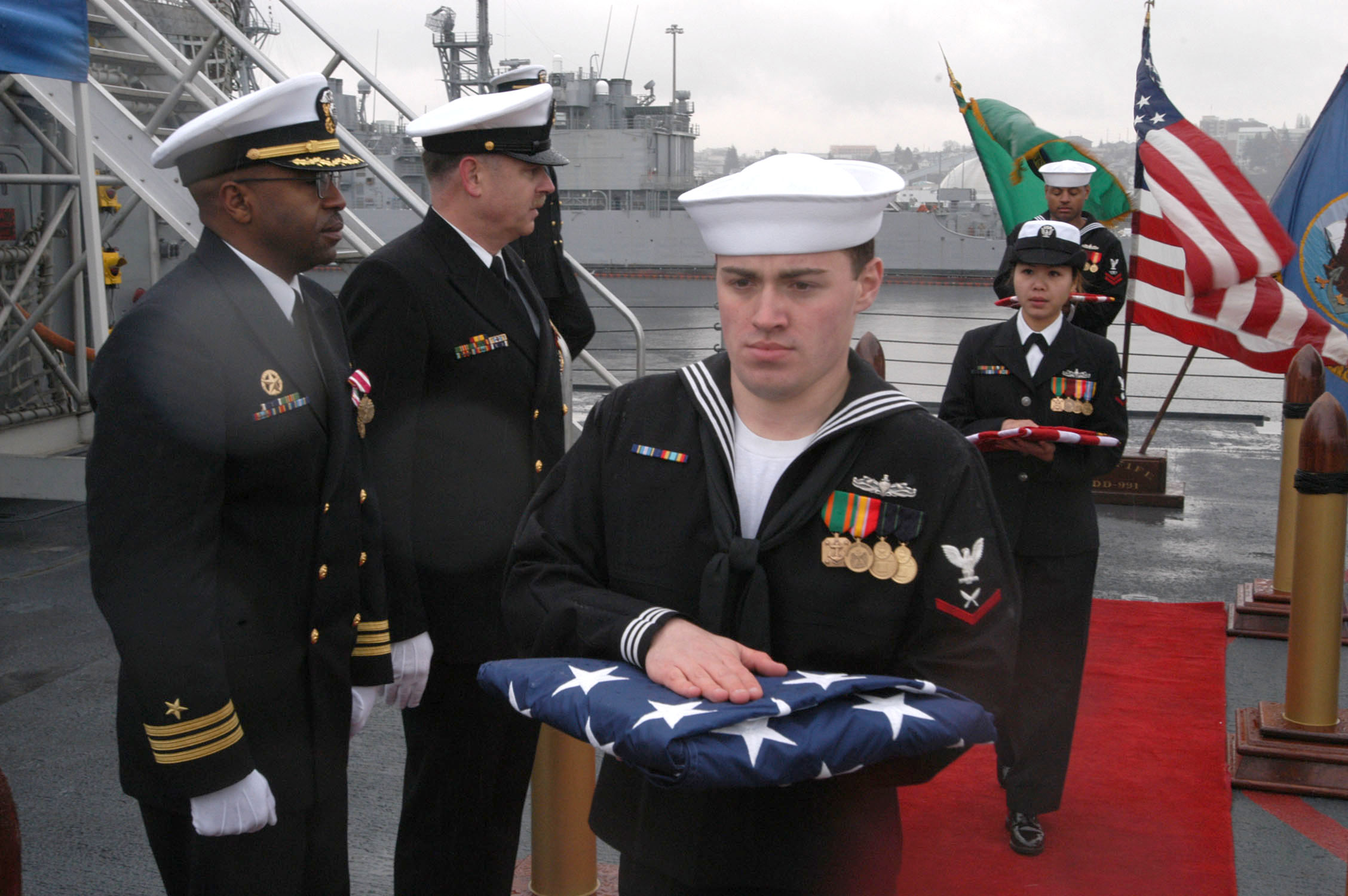
Ponds in February 2003, at the decommissioning of USS Fife.

=== 2000s ===
Ponds is a former executive officer of USS Paul F. Foster.

==== 2003 ====
Ponds was the last commanding officer of the Spruance-class destroyer USS Fife, which he commanded from 2001 to when the ship was decommissioned in February 2003.

==== 2007-2009 ====
In 2007, he took command of Amphibious Squadron EIGHT (embarked onboard USS Kearsarge), receiving the honorary title of Commodore. This period saw him engaged as Mission Commander of anti-piracy operations off the coast of Somalia; Operation Sea Angel II providing relief hurricane relief efforts in Bangladesh; and Operation Continuing Promise which included additional relief efforts in hurricane ravaged Haiti.

=== 2010s ===
==== 2015 ====
In April 2015 his appointment as the fifteenth commandant of Joint Task Force Guantanamo was announced.

Ponds retired from the U.S. Navy in late 2015.

== Awards and decorations ==
Ponds has been awarded the Defense Superior Service Medal, Legion of Merit (four), Meritorious Service Medal (five), Navy and Marine Corps Commendation Medal (three), and the Navy and Marine Corps Achievement Medal.

== Personal life ==
Ponds is married and has two children.

In the 2024 United States presidential election, Ponds endorsed Kamala Harris.
