= Salesman (1969 film) =

1969 direct cinema documentary film

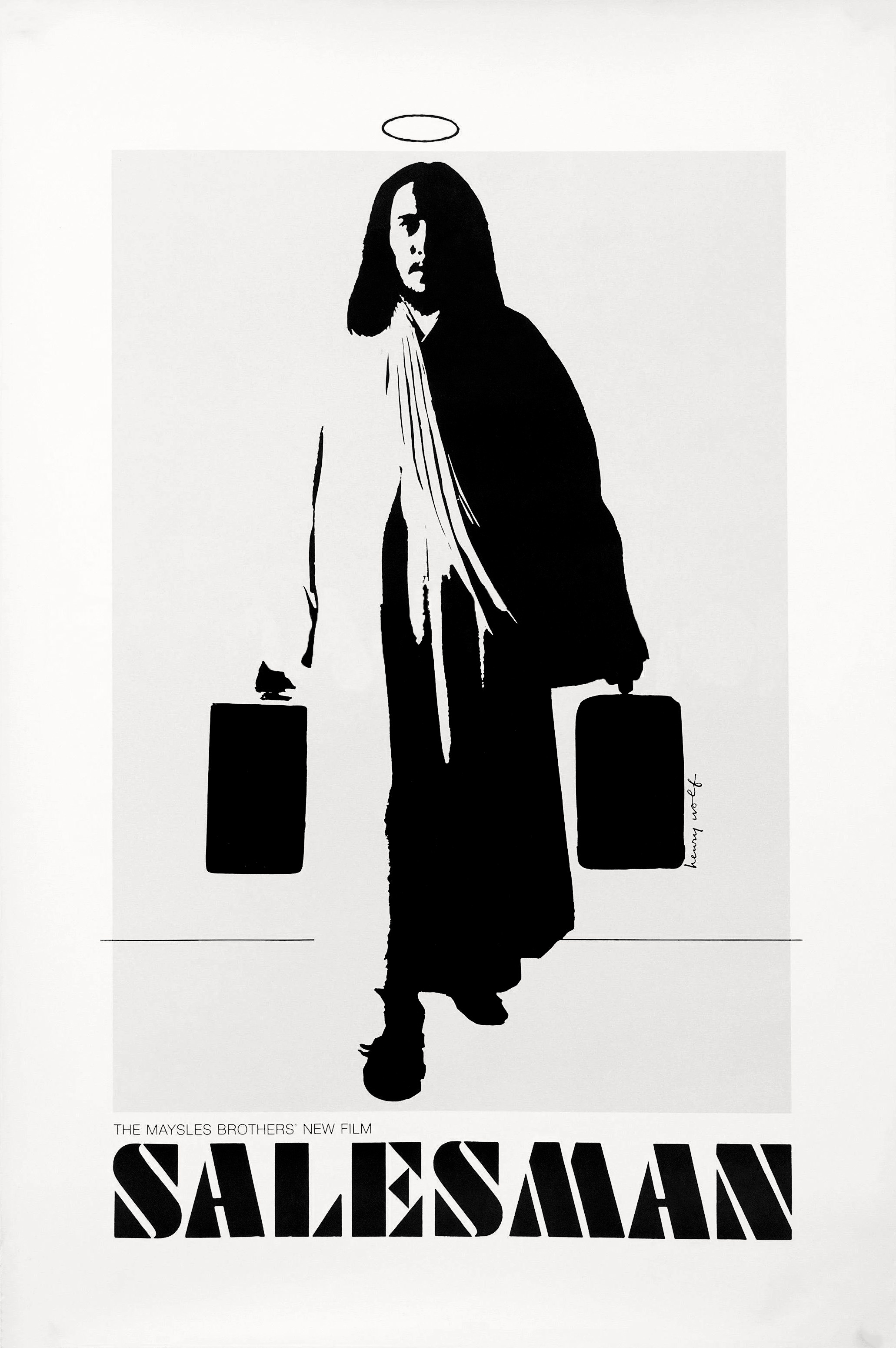
- Theatrical release poster by Henry Wolf
- Directed by: Albert Maysles; David Maysles; Charlotte Zwerin
- Written by: Albert Maysles; David Maysles
- Produced by: Albert Maysles; David Maysles
- Cinematography: Albert Maysles
- Edited by: David Maysles; Ellen Hovde; Charlotte Zwerin
- Distributed by: Maysles Films
- Release date: April 17, 1969 (United States)
- Running time: 91 minutes
- Country: United States
- Language: English

Salesman is a 1969 direct cinema documentary film, directed by brothers Albert and David Maysles and Charlotte Zwerin, about door-to-door Bible salesmen.

== Synopsis ==
The documentary follows four salesmen as they travel across New England and southeast Florida, trying to sell large, expensive Bibles door-to-door in low-income neighborhoods, and attend a sales meeting in Chicago. The film focuses in particular on salesman Paul Brennan, a middle-aged Irish-American Catholic from Jamaica Plain, Boston, who struggles to maintain his sales.

== Cast ==
- Paul Brennan, "The Badger"
- Charles McDevitt, "The Gipper"
- James Baker, "The Rabbit"
- Raymond Martos, "The Bull"
- Kennie Turner, Bible Sales Manager
- Melbourne I. Feltman, Theological Consultant (1905-1982)
- Margaret McCarron, Motel Maid

== Production ==
The Maysles brothers wanted to be the first to make a nonfiction feature film (which turned out to be Salesman) after learning that Truman Capote had made the claim that his newly released book In Cold Blood was a nonfiction novel. The film was made on a low budget; just under seven minutes into the film, one of the two cameras used can be seen in the shot, which was not unusual for a documentary film. The handheld microphone used to record the film's sound is visible in other shots, also not unusual in a documentary setting.

The Maysles brothers self-funded Salesman, costing approximately $100,000. The brothers paid each salesman $100, along with their expenses. During production, the crew consisted of Albert Maysles shooting and lighting and David Maysles doing sound. Albert Maysles never prompted anyone for the film, except when he asked Brennan to describe his fellow salesmen. In determining whom and what they would film, the Maysles brothers consulted the salesmen's schedules. Throughout production, the Maysles brothers sent footage to Zwerin, who viewed it and provided feedback. When post-production began, David Maysles and Zwerin tried to structure a story about the four salesmen, but found they did not have the material. Instead, they realized that they were dealing with a story about Brennan.

The Maysles brothers had themselves been door-to-door salesmen in the past, selling everything from cosmetics to encyclopedias. While filming, they became part of the pitch, telling those who let the salesmen and the camera crew into their homes that they were now part of "a human interest story."

Elements of popular culture that appear as backdrops to the main story include the song "If I Were a Rich Man" from Fiddler on the Roof; a recorded orchestral performance of the Beatles' song "Yesterday"; The Tonight Show Starring Johnny Carson; the theme music of the television series Ben Casey; and televised boxing matches.

As stated in the closing credits,

The filming team of Albert and David Maysles went home to Boston to take another look at the kind of people they grew up with. The idea for the film was researched and developed by David Maysles[,] who found the salesmen. The photography was by Albert Maysles. The film was edited by David Maysles and Charlotte Zwerin.

Salesman was filmed in January 1967 (perhaps also late December 1966) and bears a copyright date of 1968.

== Distribution ==
The Maysles brothers faced challenges in showing the completed film. As they tried to arrange distribution, they were told that the content was too depressing and realistic for the public. The brothers self-distributed through their production company, Maysles Films, and they booked theaters for screenings. The first theatrical screening occurred on April 17, 1969, at the 68th Street Playhouse in New York City. The brothers sold the film to National Talent Service for nontheatrical release.

== Reception ==
At the time of the documentary's initial release, the film critic for New York Times, Vincent Canby, praised both its content and structure in his April 18, 1969 review:

"Salesman", which opened yesterday at the 68th Street Playhouse, is a documentary feature about four door-to-door Bible salesmen who move horizontally through the capitalistic dream. It's such a fine, pure picture of a small section of American life that I can't imagine its ever seeming irrelevant, either as a social document or as one of the best examples of what's called cinema vérité or direct cinema... It is fact, photographed and recorded with extraordinarily mobile camera and sound equipment, and then edited and carefully shaped into a kind of cinematic mural of faces, words, motel rooms, parlors, kitchens, streets, television images, radio music—even weather.

Documentary filmmaker James Blue once said of Albert Maysles that "his cinema is one in which ethics and aesthetics are interdependent, where beauty starts with honesty, where a cut or a change in camera angle can become not only a possible aesthetic error, but also a 'sin' against truth." Gene Siskel of the Chicago Tribune included Salesman on his list of the ten best films of 1970. In late 1970, however, Pauline Kael of The New Yorker expressed her problems with the film in her negative review of the Maysles' subsequent documentary Gimme Shelter. She insists in that same review that Salesman is not truly direct cinema and alleges that the production was "set up" and that its principal characters are effectively acting. Kael even accuses the Maysles of "recruit[ing] Paul Brennan, who was in the roofing and siding business, to play a bible salesman." In response, the Maysles threatened to sue The New Yorker for libel and rebutted Kael's claims in an open letter sent to the magazine. Since The New Yorker's policy at the time prohibited the publication of such correspondence, the letter did not appear in print until 1996, when it was included in the appendix to the anthology Imagining Reality: The Faber Book of Documentary. The letter, which is signed by all three of the film's credited directors, states in part:

Miss Kael seems to be implying that we, as filmmakers, are responsible for the events we film by suggesting that we set them up or helped to stage them. In referring to our previous film, Salesman, Miss Kael says "the Maysles brothers recruited Paul Brennan, who was in the roof-and-siding business, to play a Bible salesman." Paul Brennan had been selling Bibles for eight years prior to the making of our film and was selling Bibles when we met him. No actors were used in Salesman. The men were asked to simply go on doing what they normally did while we filmed. ... We don't know where Miss Kael got her facts. We do know that her researcher phoned Paul Brennan, one of the Bible salesmen, and told him that The New Yorker was interested in doing an article about him. He made it quite clear to her that he was a Bible salesman and not a roof-and-siding salesman when we made the film about him. Aside from his own statement, this could easily have been checked out by contacting his employers, the Mid-American Bible Company.

— Albert and David Maysles and Charlotte Zwerin

== Legacy ==
In 1992, Salesman was selected for preservation in the United States National Film Registry by the Library of Congress as being "culturally, historically, or aesthetically significant." The film was preserved by the Academy Film Archive in 2018.

"Globesman" (2016) was a parody of Salesman in the fourth episode of the second season of Documentary Now!.

== See also ==
- List of American films of 1969
- Direct cinema
