= USS Fife =

Spruance-class destroyer

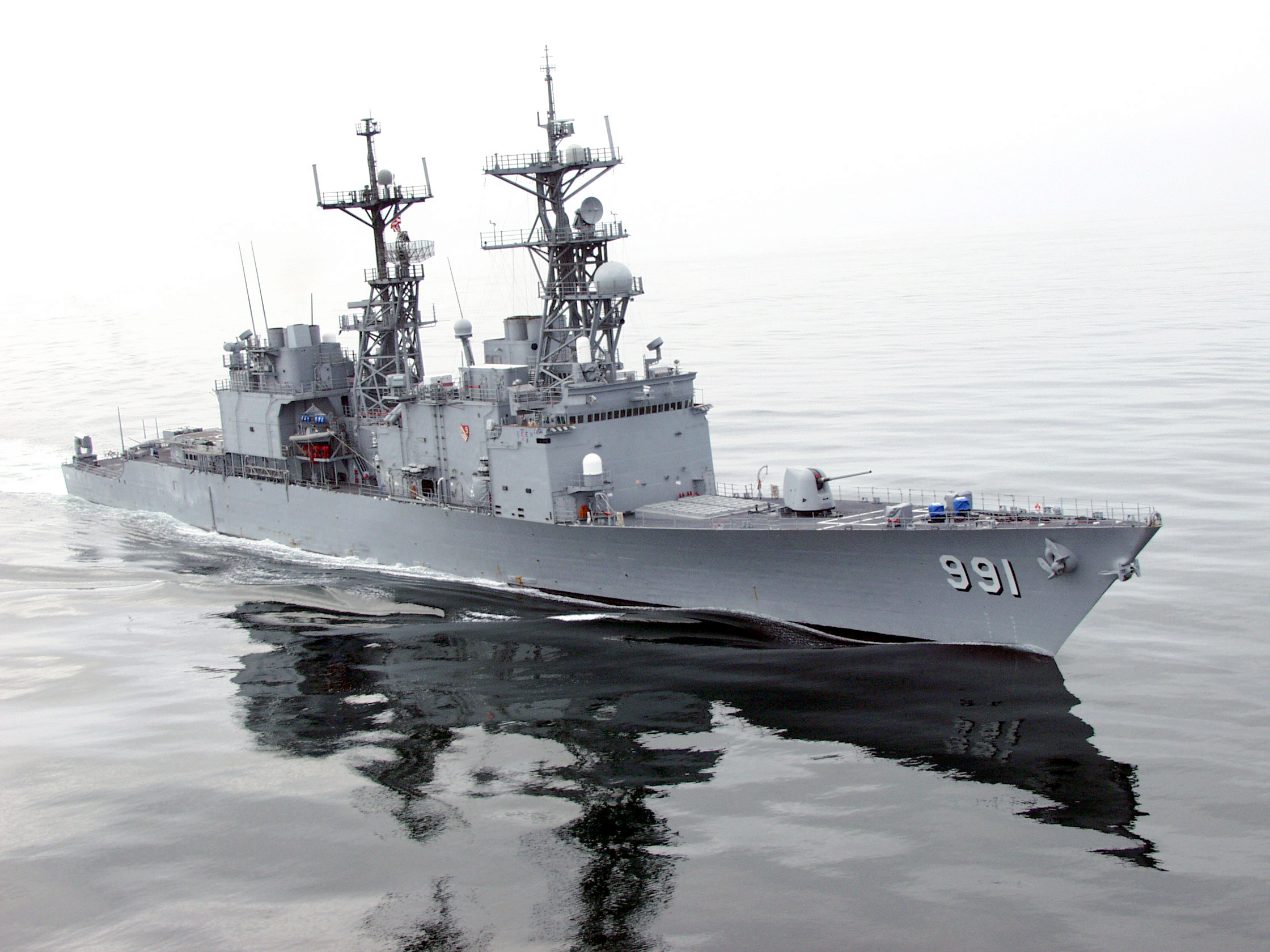
- USS Fife underway on 25 June 2002

History

United States
- Name: Fife
- Namesake: James Fife, Jr.
- Ordered: 15 January 1975
- Builder: Ingalls Shipbuilding
- Laid down: 6 March 1978
- Launched: 1 May 1979
- Acquired: 5 May 1980
- Commissioned: 31 May 1980
- Decommissioned: 28 February 2003
- Stricken: 6 April 2004
- Identification: Callsign: NDKP; Hull number: DD-991
- Motto: Successum Merere Conemur; 'Endeavor to Deserve Success'
- Fate: Sunk as target, 23 August 2005
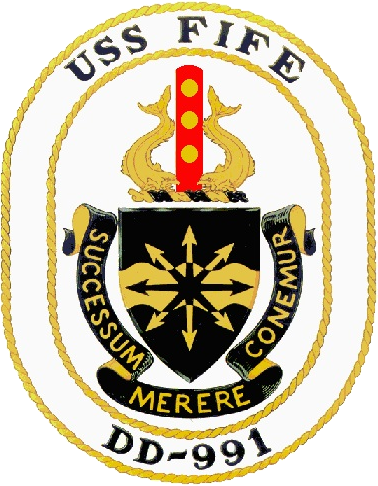
- Badge

General characteristics
- Class & type: Spruance-class destroyer
- Displacement: 8,040 long tons (8,170 t) full load
- Length: 529 ft (161 m) waterline; 563 ft (172 m) overall
- Beam: 55 ft (17 m)
- Draft: 29 ft (8.8 m)
- Installed power: 3 × 501-K17 generator sets (2,000 kW (2,700 hp) each)
- Propulsion: 4 × General Electric LM2500 gas turbines, 2 shafts, 80,000 shp (60 MW)
- Speed: 32.5 knots (60.2 km/h; 37.4 mph)
- Range: 6,000 nmi (11,000 km; 6,900 mi) at 20 knots (37 km/h; 23 mph)
- Complement: 19 officers, 315 enlisted
- Sensors & processing systems: AN/SPS-40 air search radar; AN/SPG-60 fire control radar; AN/SPS-55 surface search radar; AN/SPQ-9 gun fire control radar; Mark 23 TAS automatic detection and tracking radar; AN/SPS-65 missile fire control radar; AN/SQS-53 bow-mounted active sonar; AN/SQR-19 TACTAS towed array passive sonar; Naval Tactical Data System
- Electronic warfare & decoys: AN/SLQ-32 electronic warfare system; AN/SLQ-25 Nixie torpedo countermeasures; Mark 36 SRBOC decoy launching system; AN/SLQ-49 inflatable decoys
- Armament: 2 × 5 in (127 mm) 54 caliber Mark 45 dual purpose guns; 2 × 20 mm Phalanx CIWS Mark 15 guns; 1 × 8 cell ASROC launcher (removed); 1 × 8 cell NATO Sea Sparrow Mark 29 missile launcher; 2 × quadruple Harpoon missile canisters; 2 × Mark 32 triple 12.75 in (324 mm) torpedo tubes (Mk 46 torpedoes); 1 × 61 cell Mk 41 VLS launcher for Tomahawk missiles
- Aircraft carried: 2 × Sikorsky SH-60 Seahawk LAMPS III helicopters
- Aviation facilities: Flight deck and enclosed hangar for up to two medium-lift helicopters
- Extra armament: 1 × 21 cell RIM-116 Rolling Airframe Missile

USS Fife (DD-991), a Spruance-class destroyer, was a ship of the United States Navy named for Admiral James Fife, Jr. (1897–1975), a distinguished Submarine Force commander during World War II.

Fife was laid down on 6 March 1978 by Ingalls Shipbuilding, Pascagoula, Mississippi; launched on 1 May 1979; and commissioned on 31 May 1980.

USS Fife was the 29th of the 30 Spruance-class destroyers. Between 27 June and 11 July 2002, Fife was the U.S. Task Group flagship for the Pacific Phase of the annual UNITAS exercise conducted with naval forces from five nations off the coast of Chile. The ship's five-month deployment to the Eastern Pacific Ocean for Counter-Drug Operations and the UNITAS exercise was the final deployment for the destroyer.

Last homeported in Everett, Wash., under the command of CDR Frank Ponds, Fife was decommissioned 28 February 2003, and stricken from the Navy List 6 April 2004. Fife was sunk as a target during a live-fire exercise on 23 August 2005 by USS Russell (DDG-59).

== Etymology ==
USS Fife was named in honor of Admiral James Fife, Jr., a distinguished naval officer. He served in both World War I and World War II in submarines and surface combatants. He served in the battleship Idaho and the destroyers Leary and Hatfield from 1923 until May 1935.

When the U.S. entered World War II, Fife was Chief of Staff of Submarine Squadron 20 in the Philippines (part of the Asiatic Fleet under Admiral T. C. Hart). After the squadron was dissolved into Submarines, Asiatic Fleet, he served as Chief of Staff to Admiral Hart until May 1942. About this time he and Captain J. E. Wilkes were instrumental in identifying several deficiencies of the submarine force, especially the problems with the Mark 14 torpedo. In late 1942 he served with General MacArthur as the representative of Admiral A. S. Carpender during the Buna campaign. Following this he commanded the submarines of Task Force 42 (later Task Force 72) in Brisbane, Australia, where he meticulously planned and directed his submarines' missions. In 1944 Admiral Fife transferred to Admiral King's staff in Washington, D.C. as a war planner.

Admiral Fife was awarded the Navy Distinguished Service Medal for meritorious service as the Chief of Staff to Commander Submarines, Asiatic Fleet, the Air Medal (by the Army), and a Gold Star in lieu of a second Distinguished Service Medal for action in the Pacific area. At the close of 1944 he returned to Australia as Commander, Submarines, Seventh Fleet; Commander, U.S. Naval Forces, Western Australia; and Commander Task Force 71. As a result, he was awarded a Gold Star in lieu of a third Distinguished Service Medal.

From April 1947 until 1950, he commanded the Submarine Force, Atlantic Fleet. This assignment was followed by duty as Assistant Chief, and Deputy Chief of Naval Operations (Operations). His final assignment before retirement was as U.S. Naval Commander in Chief, Mediterranean, under Admiral Mountbatten, Royal Navy.

== History ==
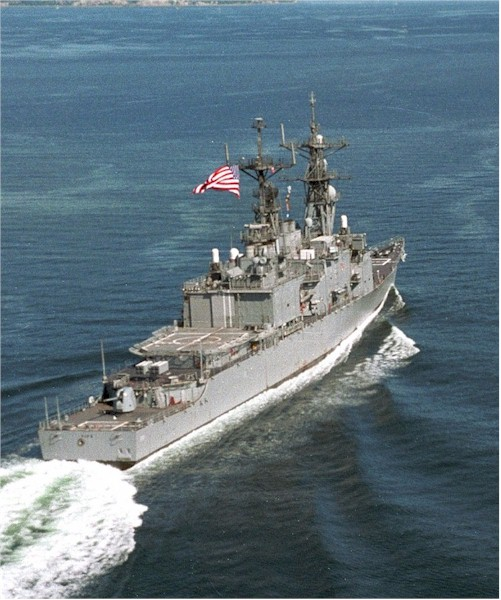
USS Fife (DD-991) underway in August 1999.

=== 1970s ===
On 6 March 1978 at the Ingalls Shipbuilding Division of Litton Industries in Pascagoula, Mississippi the keel was laid for USS Fife, the 29th Spruance-class destroyer. Launched on 21 July 1979 and sponsored by Mrs. Nancy Fife Prior, daughter of the ship's namesake Admiral James Fife Jr., the ship was commissioned on 31 May 1980.

Designed for modern antisubmarine warfare and to replace the many retiring World War II-era ships, the Spruance-class destroyer was intended to operate as a multi-mission warship either independently or in company with amphibious or carrier task groups. Powered by gas turbine engines and armed with antisubmarine rockets (ASROC), Harpoon and Sea Sparrow missiles and two 5 in (130 mm)/54 guns, Fife possessed a technical superiority with her advanced SQS-53 sonar and third generation naval tactical data system (NTDS).

=== 1980s ===
Fife was fitted out at Pascagoula, getting underway on 6 June 1980 heading for the west coast and her assignment to the Pacific Fleet. She arrived in San Diego, California, on 18 June following stops in Cozumel, Mexico and Rodman, Panama. Shakedown system trials and crew training proceeded through the summer when the destroyer's first tasking came suddenly at the end of August. Departing San Diego on 29 August, she quickly steamed north to Alaska to conduct two weeks of surveillance on a Soviet Task Force operating in American waters. Returning to San Diego on 22 September, Fife conducted final weapon system tests and exercises in preparation for her first overseas deployment.

Heading west from San Diego on 5 January 1982, Fife joined several other ships and sailed from Pearl Harbor via Guam to Subic Bay, Philippines. She conducted numerous ASW exercises with the 7th Fleet in the South China Sea before a liberty port in Manila. Exercise "Team Spirit" in South Korea preceded war-at-sea evolutions with three American aircraft carriers as part of "READIEX 82" in April. Another brief stop in Subic Bay in May for upkeep was followed by liberty visits to Hong Kong and Japan before returning to San Diego on 30 June.

==== 1983 deployment ====
On 20 July 1983 The New York Times reported that the Fife along with seven other vessels in the USS Ranger Battle Group left San Diego on Friday 15 July 1983 and were headed for the western Pacific when they were rerouted and ordered to steam for Central America to conduct training and flight operations in areas off the coasts of Nicaragua, El Salvador and Honduras as part of major military exercises planned for that summer.

Besides the Ranger, the battle group is composed of the cruiser Horne, the guided missile destroyer Lynde McCormick, the destroyers Fletcher and Fife, the frigate Marvin Shields, the oiler Wichita and the support ship Camden.

Fife's second overseas deployment began with "READIEX 83-4." Departing with the USS Ranger battlegroup on 15 July for the Persian Gulf, she alternated carrier escort duties with surveillance operations in the Gulf of Aden. While operating with the Ranger on 17 November, the Soviet guided missile frigate Razyashchiy approached the warships in what the US ships saw as a violation of international agreements for preventing collisions at sea. Fife suffered only minor damage from the resulting collision with Razyashchiy. In December, Fife sailed south for a port visit in Mombassa, Kenya. While there, a cyclone passing over Agalega in the Mauritius Islands caused massive destruction. Fife, along with her SH-2F Seasprite helicopter, provided aid transferring food and water ashore. The Fife crew and the Helicopter Anti-Submarine Squadron, Light 37, Detachment 3 were awarded the Humanitarian Service Medal for their service in aid to the Agalaga inhabitants. During the return trip north, Fife intercepted the Soviet aircraft carrier Novorossiysk and performed a brief period of surveillance before rendezvousing again with the Ranger battlegroup. Relieved by the USS Midway battlegroup in January, the warships turned for home, arriving in San Diego on 29 February 1984.

The following sixteen months were spent preparing for her next overseas deployment, with the warship's time split between local training operations, a series of overhaul periods at Long Beach (where she received new propeller blades, weapons, and electronics), and various propulsion plant inspections and pre-deployment refresher exercises. Following a Harpoon firing exercise in June 1985, the destroyer sailed for the Far East on 24 July. Following a brief stop in Subic Bay, the destroyer continued west through the Strait of Malacca to the Indian Ocean and an exercise with the Republic of Singapore Navy.

The warship suffered its first mishap on 1 September when a CH-46D Sea Knight helicopter (BuNo 151918) lost power on take-off, struck the NATO Sea Sparrow missile mount, leaving the stricken helicopter hanging over the ship's starboard side.

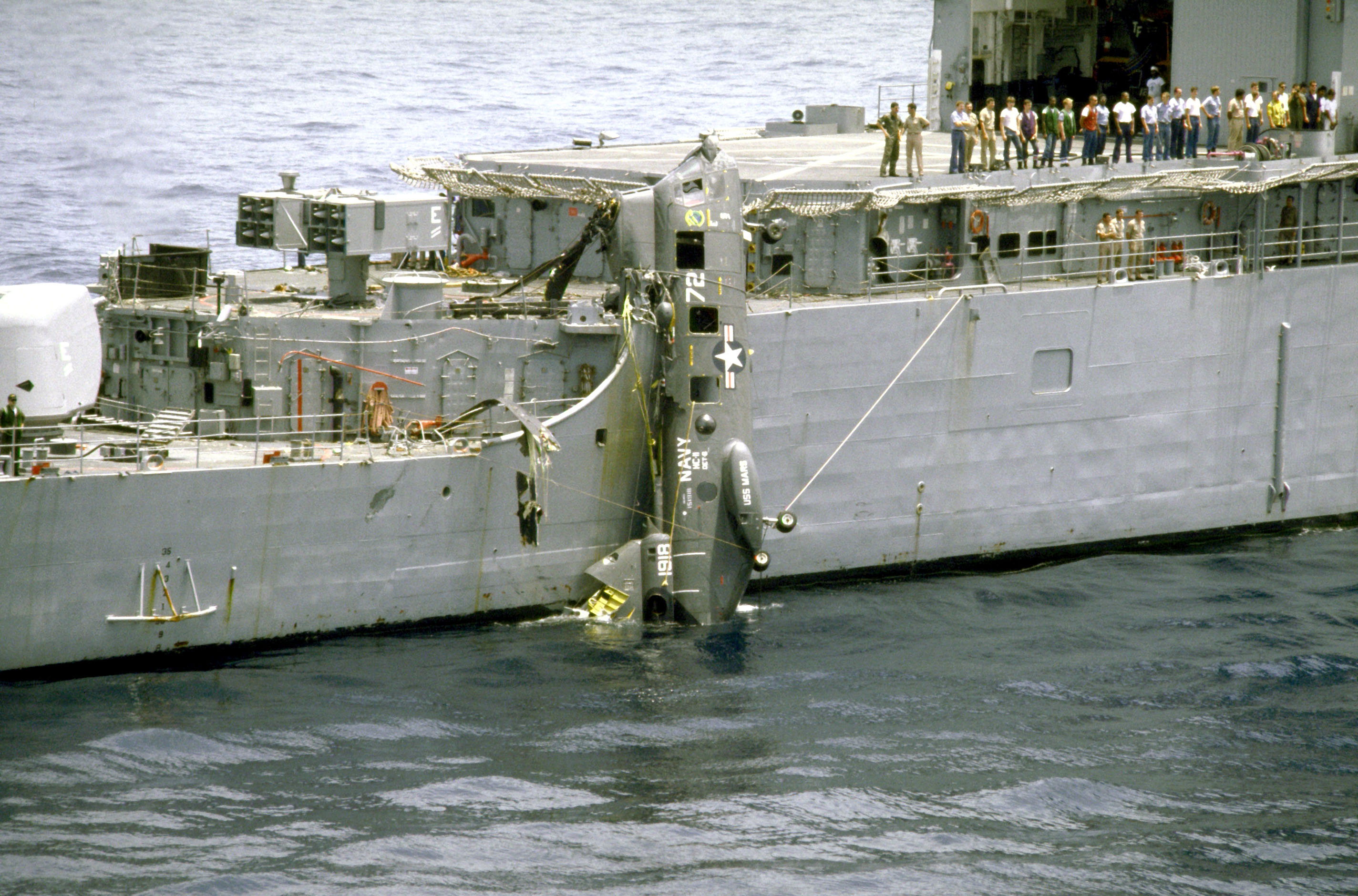
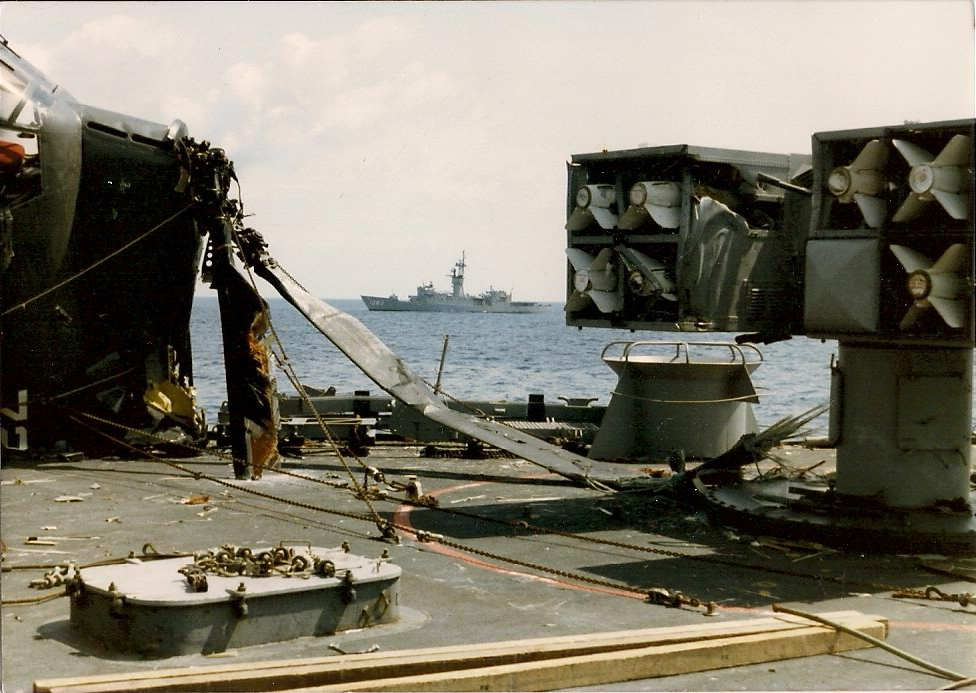
CH-46D crash on USS Fife on 1 September 1985.

Fife's damage control teams quickly lashed the CH-46 in place and all 16 personnel were rescued without serious injury. The Sea Knight was assigned to Helicopter Combat Support Squadron 11 (HC-11) Det. 6 aboard the combat stores ship USS Mars (AFS-1).

After pulling into Singapore to crane off the damaged helicopter, the warship sailed west to Diego Garcia to receive a new Seasparrow mount. In late September, Fife steamed in the vicinity of Socotra in the Gulf of Aden to conduct surveillance operations against the Soviet Navy, a mission carried out again in the Red Sea during October. After port calls to Mombassa, Kenya, and Victoria, Seychelles, Fife sailed for home on 13 November, arriving in San Diego on 21 December.

The fast pace of operations did not end upon her return. Fife immediately began a hectic series of training evolutions, department inspections, and pre-overhaul preparations. These included the exercise "Kernel Blitz" in April 1986, propulsion exams in May and June and a command inspection in August.

The destroyer then entered Southwest Marine Shipyard for an extensive overhaul, commencing 29 September. During the yard work – which was interrupted in mid-February 1987 by bomb threats made by disgruntled shipyard workers – Fife received numerous mission-expanding upgrades. The AN/SQ-89 sonar suite and the new LAMPS III helicopter system extended Fife's ASW capabilities. The Mk 41 Vertical Launching System (VLS) turned Fife into a Tomahawk cruise missile strike platform. Two Phalanx Close-in Weapon System (CIWS) point defense weapons upgraded her self-defenses, and engineering plant and firefighting system modifications improved her overall war fighting capabilities. Following almost thirteen months of work, the destroyer carried out sea trials in November before returning to San Diego on 14 December.

In 1988, as part of a forward deployment strategy, Fife changed homeports from San Diego to Yokosuka, Japan, arriving there on 31 August. During the first few months as the crew settled into their new home Fife made several short excursions, including an ASW operation in October and port visits to Subic Bay and Hong Kong in November and December 1988.

After a period in dry dock in Yokosuka to repair a crack in her sonar dome, Fife put to sea in March 1989 for surveillance operations against Soviet warships operating out of Vladivostok. On 26 June, while sailing in the South China Sea, Fife spotted a distressed boat of Vietnamese refugees. Fifty-one refugees were rescued from the sinking vessel and provided with medical assistance and other care before being delivered to a United Nations refugee organization in Thailand a week later. The warship conducted a second cruise in the region in July, during which time she rescued another boat of refugees – this time 151 Vietnamese – before conducting exercises with Thai and Australian Navy ships.

Continuing west, Fife sailed to the Persian Gulf and arrived there on 19 September. The warship steamed back east in October and, after a port visit to Fremantle, Australia, she sailed north for Yokosuka. An attempted coup in the Philippines diverted Fife in early December, however, and she stood by for possible contingency operations until the crisis abated. Fife returned to Yokosuka on 11 December.

=== 1990s ===
Fife began preparations for another Persian Gulf deployment after Iraq invaded Kuwait in August 1990. In addition to pre-deployment workups, Fife successfully passed her Cruise Missile Tactical Qualifications, On 2 October, Fife sailed in company with the USS Midway Battle Group Alpha to the Persian Gulf, arriving there on 2 November. During Operation Desert Shield, Fife helped enforce trade sanctions against Iraq as part of the Maritime Interception Force.

In mid-January 1991, Fife moved to the Persian Gulf in preparation for launching Tomahawks as the U.N. deadline for an Iraqi withdrawal from Kuwait approached. On 17 January, Fife launched all 61 missiles against Iraq during Operation Desert Storm; After the last strike was carried out on 31 January, she rendezvoused with the USS Tripoli and Amphibious Task Group 151.11, spending the next few weeks participating in minesweeping and feint operations in the northern Gulf off Kuwait. Fife provided some assistance to Tripoli and USS Princeton after they suffered mine hits in February. Departing the Persian Gulf on 9 March, the destroyer stopped at Pattaya Beach, Thailand, Singapore, Hong Kong, and Subic Bay, before returning to Yokosuka on 17 April.

Departing Japan again on 15 April 1992, Fife made liberty stops at Bali, Indonesia, Singapore, and Phukett, before arriving at Muscat, Oman, on 19 May. After transiting the Straits of Hormuz on 24 May, the warship came under control of the newly established Central Command in the Persian Gulf and helped enforce United Nations sanctions against Iraq. In company with the Independence battle group, Fife sailed for home on 17 September and, following stops at Pattaya Beach and Hong Kong, arrived in Yokosuka on 13 October.

In October, Fife entered Dry Dock 5 at Yokosuka for regular system maintenance and repair.

Work was complete in February 1994. After successful sea trials in early April, Fife got underway on 13 April for an extended post-overhaul cruise into the southern Pacific waters. In May, the destroyer sailed on to Thailand, where she participated in Exercise "Cobra Gold" before returning to Yokosuka on 1 June.

On 4 July 1995 the destroyer USS Fife conducted a five-day port visit to Vladivostok, Russia, during which it celebrate both America's Independence Day and the city's 135th anniversary.

Underway again on 22 August 1995, Fife transited the Straits of Malacca on 30 August and, after catching up to the Independence Battle Group, arrived in Bahrain on 9 September. In a reprise of her last visit, Fife assumed the duties of Ready Strike Platform in the northern Persian Gulf and carried out Maritime Interdiction Operations (MIO) as required. As part of the latter duties, Fife's Visit, Boarding, Search, and Seizure (VBSS) team uncovered thousands of contraband automobile tires and batteries hidden in the Indian-flagged tramp Al Shakeel. This was the largest seizure in months and caused a shift in focus toward smaller ships and dhows previously overlooked. Although the Independence BG departed the area in October, Fife remained on station owing to a shortage of strike platforms in the region. Departing the region on 13 November, Fife steamed for home and arrived in Yokosuka on 7 December, following stops at Phukett and Singapore.

On 6 June, during RIMPAC '96, Fife helped protect Independence during the numerous war-at-sea exercises and attacks by "enemy" surface action groups and submarines. At one point, the Japanese warship Yuugiri accidentally shot down an A-6 Intruder from Independence during a live-fire CIWS exercise. Fife closed the area to help rescue both aviators and recover wreckage for analysis. The ship's crew ended the operation with a port visit in Pearl Harbor, a rare stateside visit for forward deployed naval forces.

During a Bible Study session with crewmembers on 15 December 1996, Captain Tamayo fell into a coma and died while being transported to the Yokosuka Naval Hospital emergency room via the Fife's HSL-51 Detachment TWO helicopter. Hospital Corpsman Chief (HMC) David Taylor and Aviation Warfare Systems Operator Second Class (AW2) Sean Kugler performed CPR on Captain Tamayo both prior to and for the entirety of the 45-minute flight. Unfortunately, Captain Tamayo succumbed to what was later reported to be a brain aneurysm.

Fife returned to Japan in July and departed Japan on 24 February 1997 for her next deployment, this time sailing south for exercises off Australia. After a stop in Guam to refuel, the ship arrived in the Coral Sea on 14 March. There, she joined Australian and other US ships for Exercise "Tandem Thrust '97" – a joint surface warfare evolution. Fife then visited Hobart, Melbourne, and Esperance during a half-circumnavigation of Australia before stopping in Bali for three days of liberty. She moved on to Jakarta, Indonesia, in late April before steaming to Thailand for Exercise "Cobra Gold '97." After a final ASW exercise with the Japanese Navy in June, the warship moored at Yokosuka on 16 July.

Following the ASW Exercise "Sharem 108-2" off Japan in late January 1998, Fife sailed south to Darwin, Australia. Arriving there on 18 February, she participated in the anniversary ceremony of the bombing of Darwin during World War II. After returning home in March, Fife's crew then loaded Tomahawk missiles for transit to Hawaii for maintenance. Her crew also prepared for a shift of homeport from Yokosuka to Everett, Washington. Departing Japan on 9 April, the warship stopped at Pearl Harbor to swap out missiles before steaming to Everett and mooring there on 5 May. After settling into her new homeport, the warship made preparations for her next deployment.

Embarking Helicopter Antisubmarine Squadron Light 49 (HSL 49) with an SH-60 Seahawk helicopter and a Coast Guard boarding team, Fife steamed south to the coast of Mexico on 5 October. There, she tracked suspect vessels and conducted boardings in support of counter-narcotic operations. The warship also coordinated patrols by P-3C Orion and C-130 Hercules aircraft, which helped Mexican counter-narcotic aircraft to force down a suspect aircraft and capture half a ton of cocaine. Fife returned to Everett on 18 December.

=== 2000s ===
After her return, Fife moved to Bremerton, Washington for restricted availability on 13 October, a period that would last until 10 January 2000. Two weeks later she sailed south to San Diego for pre-deployment training operations. Those were interrupted by search-and-rescue efforts following the crash of Alaska Airlines Flight 261 on 31 January 2000. Departing Everett on 31 March, Fife sailed west to the Persian Gulf via Pearl Harbor and Townsville and Darwin, Australia. She transited the Strait of Hormuz on 19 May and began sanction enforcement operations three days later. The warship departed the Gulf on 2 August and, after stops in Phukett, Singapore, and Hong Kong, she returned once again to Everett on 29 September.

Fife spent the remainder of the year preparing for her upcoming shipyard availability and started 2001 in Todd Shipyard Seattle, where, among other work, she received an upgrade to the Advanced Tomahawk Weapon Control System. She completed her training cycle on 23 October, right after a change of command when Fife's final commanding officer, Commander Fernandez L. Ponds was instated. Fife then headed south on a six-week surge to South America, where she seized 600 pounds of cocaine before returning to homeport on 14 December.

After splitting the winter between Everett and San Diego, Fife geared up for her final deployment. On 20 May 2002, Fife departed from Everett and headed south for six months off the coast of Central and South America. Taking along HSL 47 Detachment 3, as well as a Coast Guard law enforcement detachment (LEDET), Fife began the deployment with a few weeks of counter-narcotics operations, during which time she located a vessel loaded with illegal migrants from Ecuador. The vessel was intercepted and escorted to Guatemala where it was turned over to authorities. In July, Fife embarked Commander, Destroyer Squadron 14, and served as the US Flagship in the Chilean-sponsored UNITAS 43-02 Pacific Phase exercises. A month of training and exercises with five different Central and South American navies culminated in a full-scale three-day war-at-sea exercise.

Upon the conclusion of the UNITAS exercises, Fife participated with the submarine forces of Peru in the Silent Force Exercise (SIFOREX). Through sixteen ASW exercises, Fife demonstrated her ASW prowess, and was not "sunk" by the enemy forces.

==== Decommissioning and disposal ====
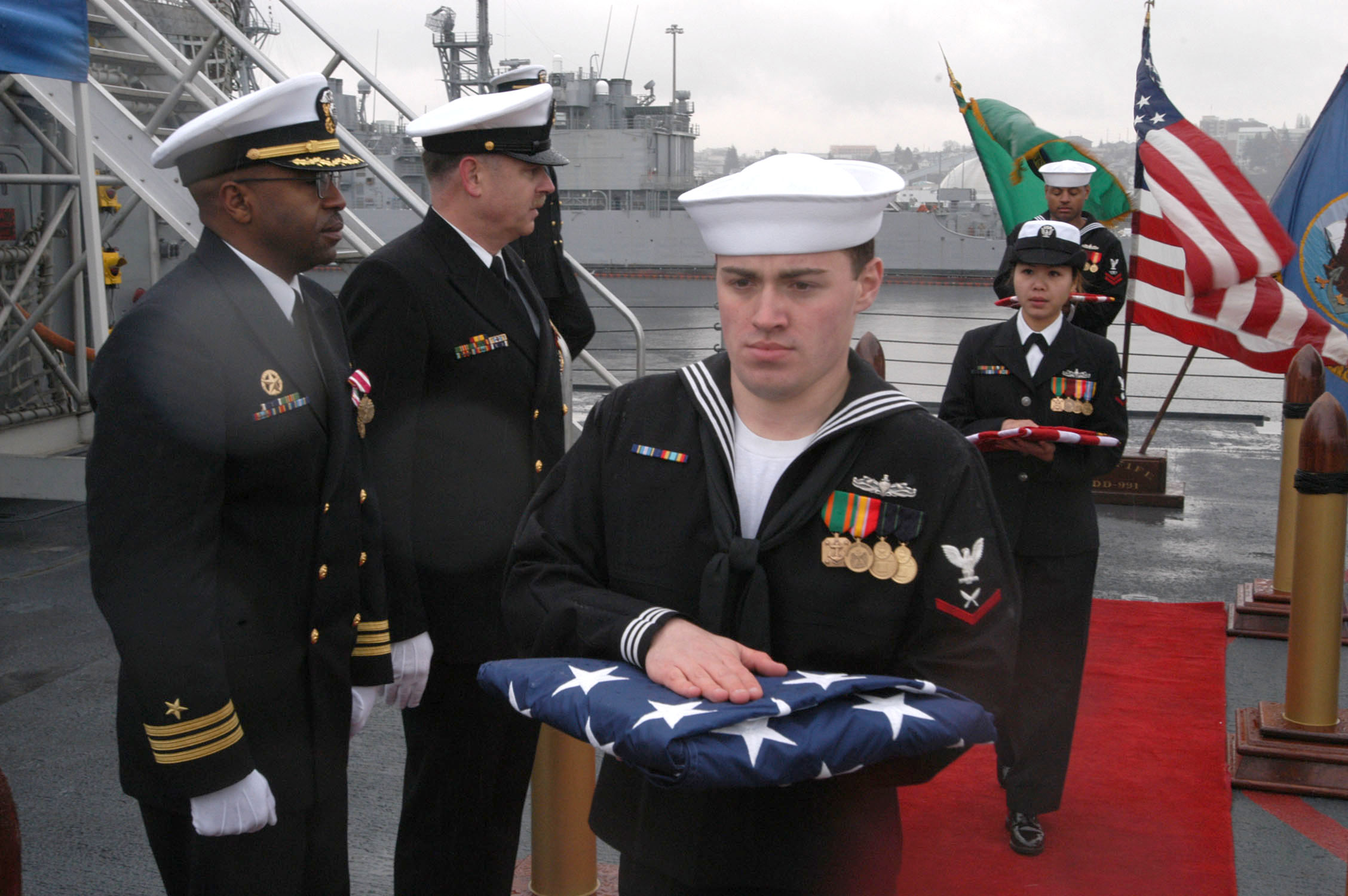
USS Fife's flags are removed during her decommissioning ceremony in February 2003.

For the last four months of Fife's final deployment she continued with her counter-narcotic mission. Nine suspected drug smugglers were detained, and over two tons of cocaine were recovered. All told, Fife interdicted over $900 million worth, as well as making the largest bust of illegal shark fin on record – $6.5 million.

Fife returned to Everett on 20 November making preparations for decommissioning. On 28 February 2003, Fife was decommissioned after 22 years of dedicated service to her country.

Fife was stricken from the Navy list on 6 April 2004, and sunk as a target in the Pacific Ocean off Washington on 23 August 2005 by several ships of the United States Third Fleet including the guided-missile destroyer USS Preble (DDG-88) and the guided-missile frigate USS Curts (FFG-38).

== Crest ==
The official crest of USS Fife is highly symbolic of the ship's namesake, Admiral James Fife, Jr. Admiral Fife was an especially distinguished submariner. The dolphins, old maritime symbols, represent his career that included service in both Atlantic and Pacific Oceans during World Wars I and II. The dolphins are adapted from the submarine service badges and signify Admiral Fife's service.

The dolphins also symbolize USS Fife's mission of anti-submarine warfare. The red torpedo alludes to Admiral Fife's submarine command during World War II; the red color denotes his active service during war. The three gold discs on the torpedo represent the three Distinguished Service Medals awarded to Admiral Fife for his exceptional service during the war. The Latin quote reads "Successm Merere Conemur" which translates to "Endeavor to Deserve Success".

=== The shield ===
The gold and dark blue of the shield are colors associated with the Navy and symbolize the sea and excellence. The shield is divided into three sections to represent the air, surface, and subsurface environments of naval warfare. The bursting bomb extends into all areas of the shield and signifies the versatility and striking power of USS Fife.

=== The motto ===
The ship's motto, "SUCCESSUM MERERE CONEMUR", translates as "ENDEAVOR TO DESERVE SUCCESS".

== Gallery ==
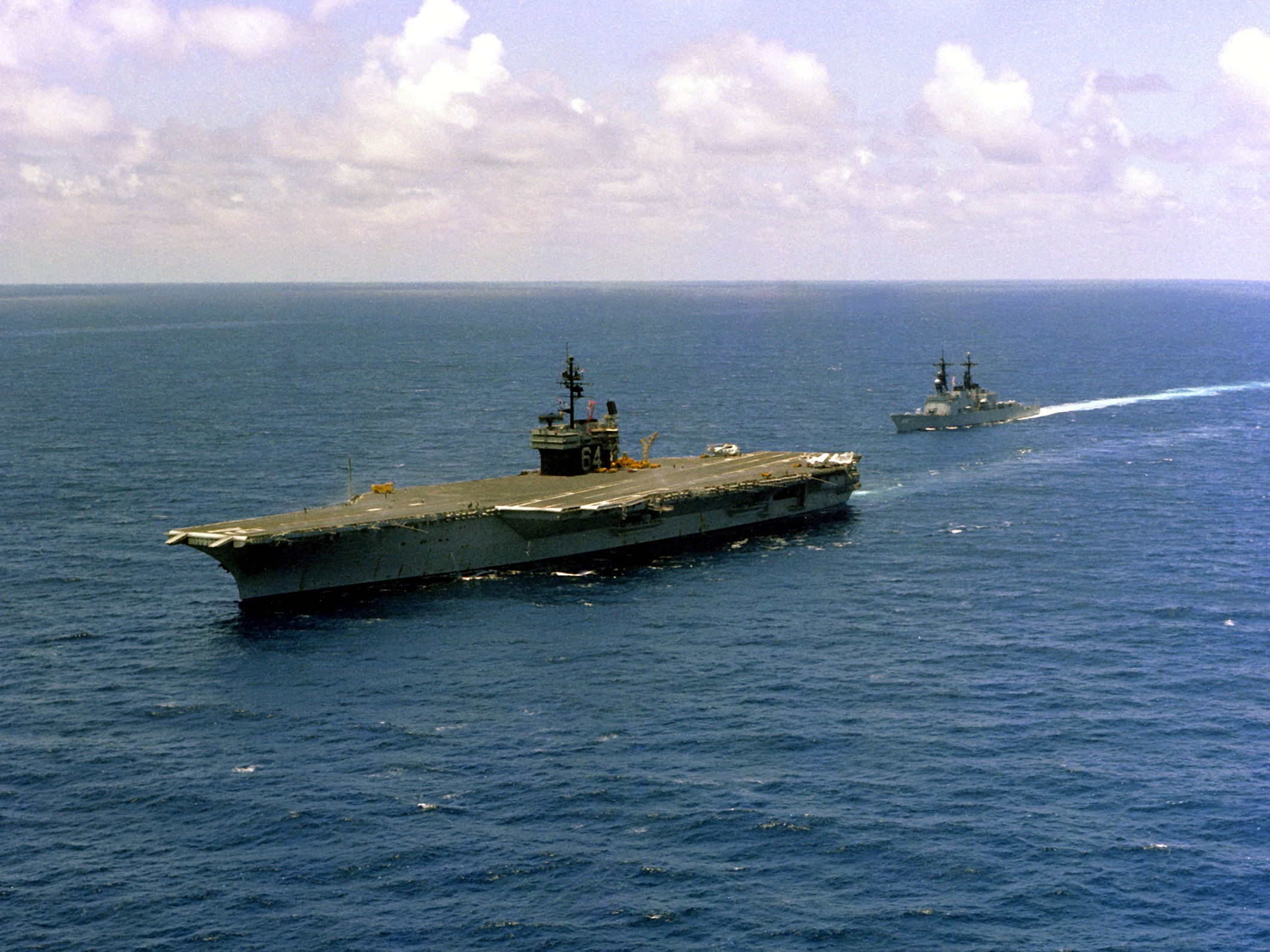
USS Fife and USS Constellation off California in 1981

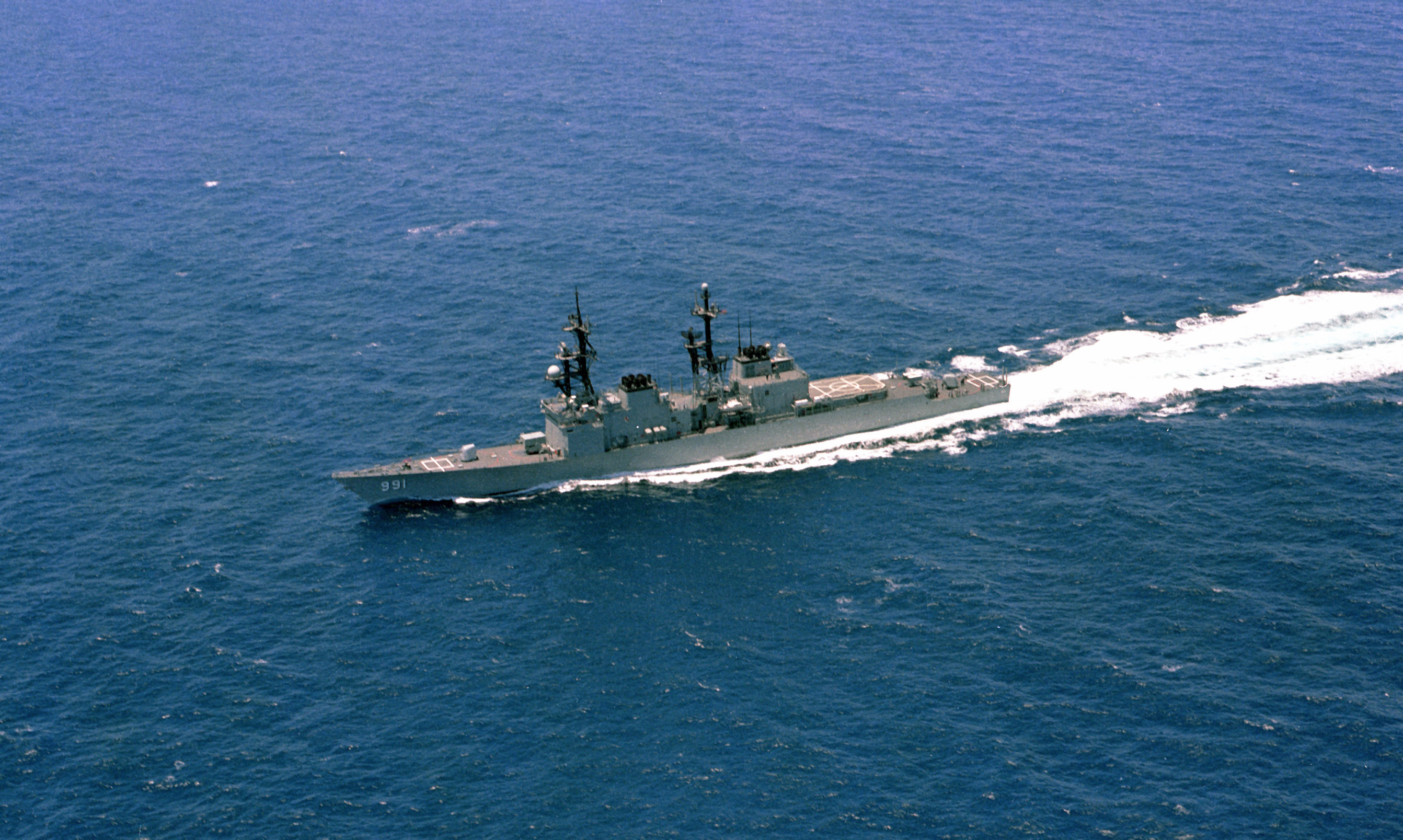
USS Fife on 1 August 1981

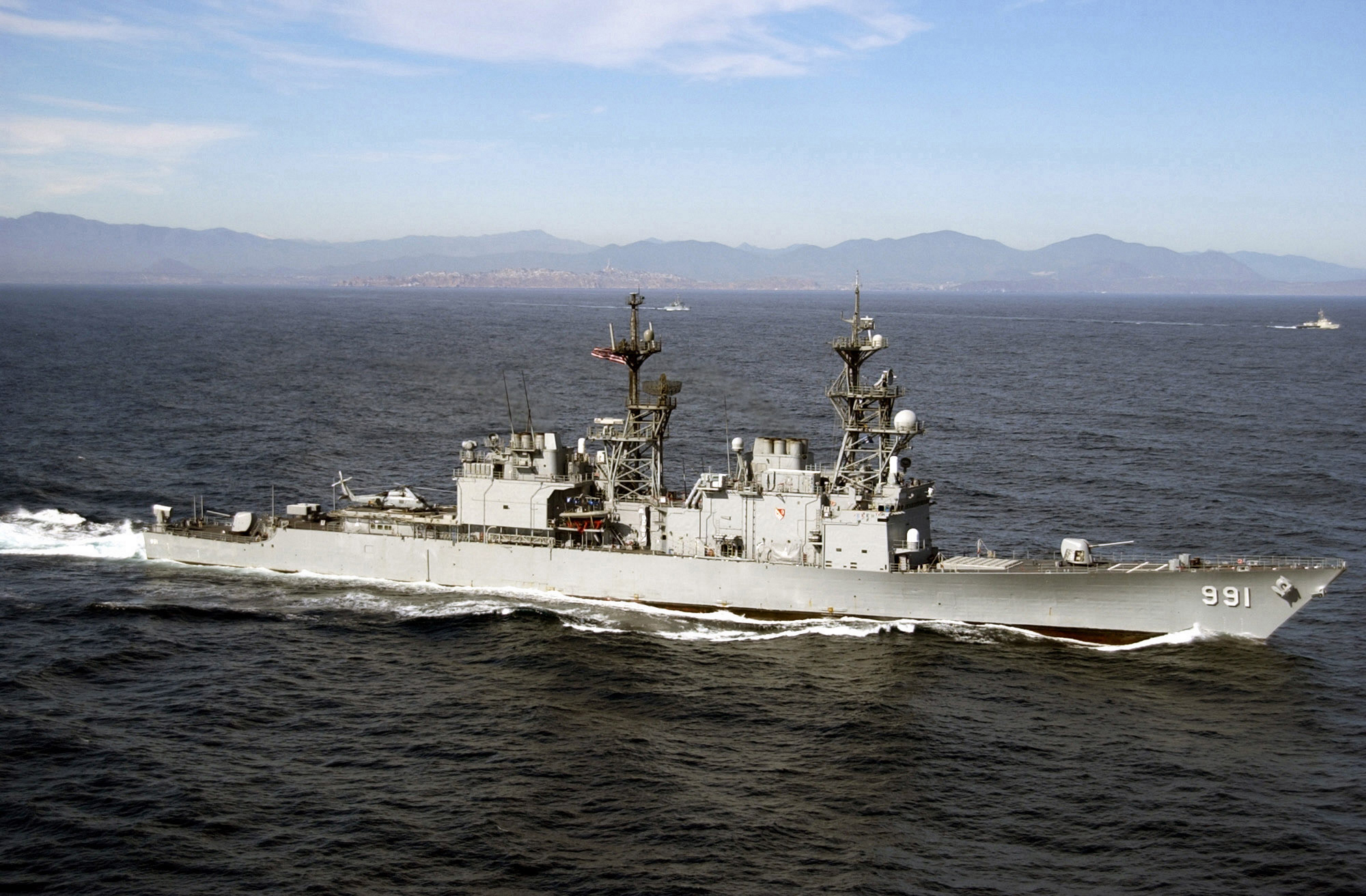
USS Fife on 3 July 2002

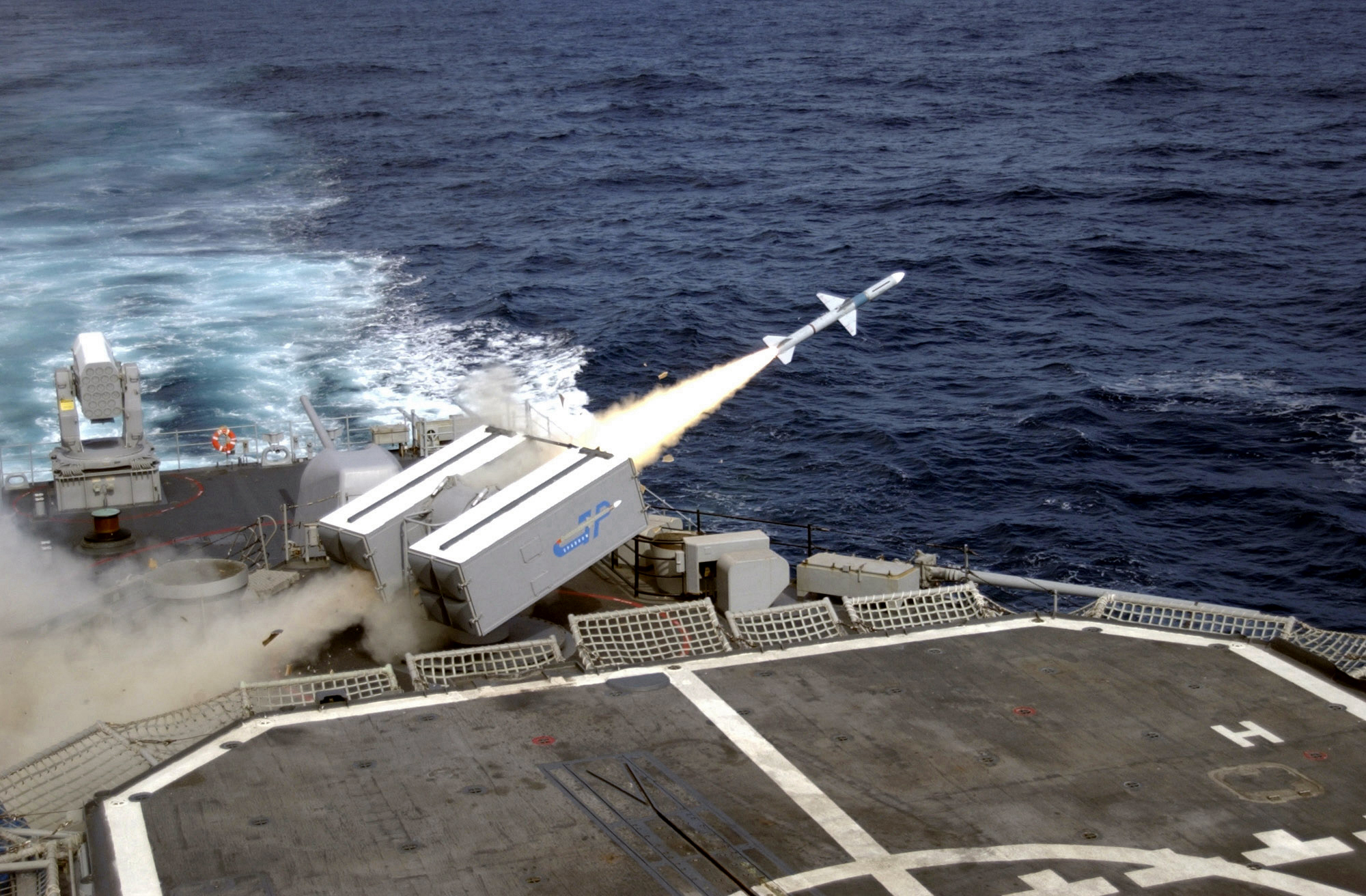
USS Fife fires a RIM-7 Sea Sparrow on 5 July 2002
