= James J. Plaster =

American politician

Member of the Alabama House of Representatives from the 82nd district
- In office 1974–1978

Personal details
- Born: September 23, 1926 Autaugaville, U.S.
- Died: December 12, 2012 (aged 86)
- Party: Democratic
- Spouse: Marcia Bowers
- Education: Auburn University

James J. Plaster (September 23, 1926 – December 12, 2012) was an American politician. He served as a member for the 82nd district of the Alabama House of Representatives.

== Life and career ==
Plaster was born in Autaugaville. He attended Hicks Memorial High School and served in the United States Navy during World War II. After his service, he attended Auburn University.

In 1974, Plaster was elected to represent the 82nd district of the Alabama House of Representatives, serving until 1978.

Plaster died in December 2012, at the age of 86.
