= Rock the Night (Robert Walker album) =

Live album by Robert Walker
- Released: October 23, 2001
- Recorded: February 4, 2000
- Genre: Blues
- Label: Rooster Blues
- Producer: Robert Walker

Robert Walker chronology
Rompin' & Stompin' (1998)	Rock the Night (2001)

Rock the Night is the first live album by the American blues rock guitarist Robert Walker. It was recorded on February 4, 2000 and released on October 23, 2001 by Rooster Blues.

== Reception ==
Professional ratings
Review scores
Source	Rating
AllMusic	4/5 stars
The Penguin Guide to Blues Recordings	3.5/4 stars

After the blandness of Rompin' & Stompin', Rock the Night fared considerably better. This was due in part to having fellow veteran musicians such as Carr and Porter, who are "as wild as Walker, but less wayward." The "tethering" of Walker by the others leads to some fun moments. That does not mean that they performed flawlessly, though, since reviewer Chris Smith comments how "Hide Way" "has so many wrong notes that it's almost a new composition", and that other songs also get "a thorough mauling."

== Track listing ==
1. "Cut You A Loose" (London) — 4:33
2. "Found Love" (Reed) — 3:45
3. "Rooster Blues" (West) — 3:43
4. "Linda Lu" (Sharpe) — 2:51
5. "Standing at My Window/Don't Answer the Door" (Crudup, Johnson) — 5:38
6. "Truck Driving Man" (Fell) — 2:02
7. "Why I Sing the Blues" (Clark, King) — 3:58
8. "Memphis" (Berry) — 2:54
9. "Stagger Lee" (traditional) — 3:50
10. "Robert B. Goode/Little Queenie" (Berry) — 3:57
11. "Hide Away" (King, Thompson) — 3:32

== Personnel ==
Performers:

- David "Pecan" Porter — bass
- Sam Carr — drums
- Robert Walker — guitar, vocals

Production:

- Jim O'Neal — producer, mixing
- Tomas Ford — engineer
- Jack LeTourneau — engineer, mixing
- Bill Steber — photography
- Jannell Turner — art direction, design, photography
