= Willie King =

- Born: March 18, 1943; Prairie Point, Mississippi, United States
- Died: March 8, 2009 (aged 65) Old Memphis, Alabama, United States
- Genres: Blues
- Occupation: Musician
- Instrument(s): Guitar, singing
- Labels: Rooster Blues, Freedom Creek
- Website: www.willie-king.com

Willie King (March 18, 1943 – March 8, 2009) was an American blues guitarist and singer, known for shunning fame and playing at a local bar in Mississippi.

== Biography ==
King was born in Prairie Point, a community in Noxubee County, Mississippi near the Alabama border. Prior to recording, he worked in many occupations including as a sharecropper, a moonshine maker, and a traveling salesmans. He later became active with the civil rights movement, which inspired him to write socially conscious blues songs. In 1983, he founded the Rural Members Association, a non-profit organization dedicated to promoting the traditional rural skills King had grown up with, which he called 'survival skills,' and helping improve his local community. In 1997, the Rural Members Association started the annual Freedom Creek blues festival, which has since received international recognition. He began recording in 1999 and his 2000 recordings Freedom Creek and I Am The Blues, were the first of several acclaimed albums.

King performed at national and international festivals but mostly played near his home, most notably as a regular at Bettie's Juke joint in Mississippi. He described his music as "struggling blues" because of its focus on the "injustices in life in the rural South".

King died from a heart attack shortly before his 66th birthday, near his home in the rural community of Old Memphis, Alabama, just a few miles from his birthplace.

== Willie King on film ==
Dutch film-makers Saskia Rietmeijer and Bart Drolenga (Visible World Films) wanted to produce a documentary about African American arts and culture in the Deep South. But they met Willie King and instead decided to devote their efforts to creating a documentary about King's life and times, titled Down in the Woods. King was also featured in Martin Scorsese's 2003 documentary series The Blues and Shout Factory's Blues Story the same year.

== Discography ==
=== Albums ===
Date	Title	Label	Comments
1999	Walkin' the Walk Talkin' the Talk	self-produced	With "Birmingham" George Conner
2000	I Am the Blues	Rural Members Association	
2000	Freedom Creek	Rooster Blues	Live with the Liberators
2002	Living in a New World	Rooster Blues	With the Liberators
2004	Jukin' at Bettie's	Freedom Creek Music	
2006	One Love	Freedom Creek Music	

=== Videos ===
Date	Title	Label	Formats	Comments
2003	Blues Story	Shout Factory	DVD	Directed by Jay Levey
2003	The Blues: Feel Like Going Home	Universal/Sony	DVD, VHS	First episode of a seven-part documentary by Martin Scorsese
2007	Down in the Woods	Visible World Films	DVD	63-minute documentary plus 40 minutes of live music

== Awards ==
- Alabama Folk Heritage Award (awarded posthoumously) 2009
- Howlin' Wolf Hall of Fame Inducted September 2, 2005
- Alabama State Council on the Arts 2004 Artist Fellowship
- Living Blues 2003 Blues Artist of the Year, Best Song, Best Cover Art
- Living Blues 2001 Best Blues Artist
- Living Blues 2000 Best Blues Album, Best Contemporary Blues Album

== See also ==
- Rooster Blues
