= Chikan Supe =

Studio album by Super Chikan
- Released: 2005

Chikan Supe is an album by James "Super Chikan" Johnson, released in 2005.

== Track listing ==
1. "Poor Broke Boy"
2. "Reliable Sources"
3. "Wavy Thoughts"
4. "Just Ain't The Same No Mo'"
5. "Old Field Song"
6. "Ground Zero"
7. "Clarksdale"
8. "Don't Play"
9. "Special Glow"
10. "Robert Johnson"
11. "A Tribute To The King"
12. "Groundhog Blues"
13. "All My Yesterdays"
14. "Heartache"
