= Bruce Ricker =

American filmmaker

- Born: October 10, 1942; Staten Island, New York
- Died: May 13, 2011 (aged 68)
- Occupation: filmmaker

Bruce Ricker (October 10, 1942 – May 13, 2011) was a jazz and blues documentarian. He is best known for his collaboration with Clint Eastwood on films about jazz and blues legends.

== Life and career ==
Ricker was born on Staten Island, Ricker was educated at the City College of New York where he earned a bachelor's degree in American Studies. He earned a law degree from Brooklyn Law School in 1970.

His first film was the critically acclaimed The Last of the Blue Devils, a 1979 feature-length documentary about Kansas City jazz during its heyday in the 1930s and 1940s.

Eastwood was the executive producer for Thelonious Monk: Straight, No Chaser, a 1988 documentary produced by Ricker and Charlotte Zwerin, who also directed.

Ricker developed the idea for the Eastwood-directed "Piano Blues" segment of The Blues, the seven-part 2003 series executive produced by Martin Scorsese.

Eastwood served as a producer or executive producer on documentaries Ricker made for television: Budd Boetticher: A Man Can Do That (2005), Tony Bennett: The Music Never Ends (2007), Johnny Mercer: The Dream's on Me (2009) and Dave Brubeck: In His Own Sweet Way (2010).

Ricker also directed and produced the 1997 TV documentary Eastwood After Hours: Live at Carnegie Hall and Clint Eastwood: Out of the Shadows, a documentary that aired on PBS' American Masters series in 2000.

He died in 2011 at the age of 68 in Cambridge, Massachusetts.
