= Autaugaville, Alabama =

- Town
- Town of Autaugaville
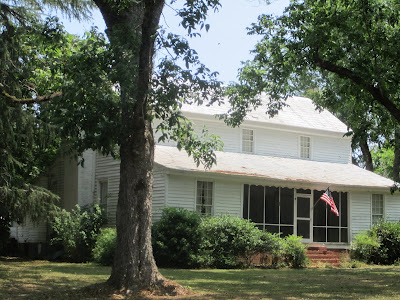
- The Lassiter House in Autaugaville, which is listed on the National Register of Historic Places.

- Location of Autaugaville in Autauga County, Alabama.
- Coordinates: 32°26′04″N 86°38′22″W
- Country: United States
- State: Alabama
- County: Autauga
- Founded: 1907

Area
  - Total: 8.04 sq mi (20.82 km^{2})
  - Land: 7.83 sq mi (20.29 km^{2})
  - Water: 0.20 sq mi (0.53 km^{2})
- Elevation: 157 ft (48 m)

Population (2020)
  - Total: 795
  - Density: 101.5/sq mi (39.19/km^{2})
- Time zone: UTC-6 (Central (CST))
  - Summer (DST): UTC-5 (CDT)
- ZIP code: 36003
- Area code: 334
- FIPS code: 01-03220
- GNIS feature ID: 2405187
- Website: autaugavilleal.com

Autaugaville is a town in Autauga County, Alabama, United States. At the 2020 census, the population was 795. It is part of the Montgomery Metropolitan Statistical Area.

== Geography ==
Autaugaville is located in the central part of the state along Alabama State Route 14, which runs west to east through the center of town, leading east 14 mi (23 km) to Prattville, the Autauga County seat, and west 24 mi (39 km) to Selma.

According to the U.S. Census Bureau, the town has a total area of 7.8 square miles (20 km^{2}), of which, 7.6 square miles (20 km^{2}) of it is land and 0.2 square miles (0.52 km^{2}) of it is water.

== History ==
William Thompson, the first settler in what is now Autaugaville arrived around 1820 and built a gristmill and sawmill on Swift Creek, about three miles upriver from the Alabama River. One source says that the town incorporated in 1839, but another cites 1907. A cotton mill opened in 1849 on the banks of Swift Creek, and following upon the model of industrialist Daniel Pratt, the owner constructed housing for its employees, expanding the town. It grew further when many citizens from nearby Vernon relocated here to escape the floods and diseases to which that town was prone. By 1851, the town had a population of 351 and claimed four stores, two churches, and two schools.

Additional businesses opened during this period, including a cloth factory, a buggy and wagon factory, and a gristmill, making it a thriving manufacturing center. The downtown area was seriously damaged by a fire in 1853, but quickly rebuilt. The town's first and only newspaper, the Autauga Citizen, also began publication in 1853, existing until 1873.

The Civil War and Reconstruction resulted in the closing of the town's factories, including the cotton factory, which saw its shipments seized by the U.S. government. The war and its aftermath essentially ended Autaugaville's status as a manufacturing center. The town incorporated in 1907, and the Alabama Central Railroad built a branch through town in 1911. At least one of several lumber mills operated periodically until the 1930s. In 1936, an Alabama Forestry Commission nursery opened near town. Crystal Lake Manufacturing Company makes brooms, mops, and handles in Autaugaville but closed at the end of 2020. Many Autaugaville residents are employed in the automotive parts industry.

== Education ==
Autaugaville is part of the Autauga County School System and is home to Autaugaville School for prekindergarten to grade 12 students.

== Demographics ==
=== Town of Autaugaville ===
Historical population
Census	Pop.	Note	%±
1910	313		—
1920	362		15.7%
1930	450		24.3%
1940	456		1.3%
1950	459		0.7%
1960	440		−4.1%
1970	870		97.7%
1980	843		−3.1%
1990	681		−19.2%
2000	820		20.4%
2010	870		6.1%
2020	795		−8.6%
U.S. Decennial Census

Autaugaville first appeared on the census as an incorporated town in 1910. See Autaugaville Precinct below.

=== 2020 Census data ===
Autaugaville racial composition
Race	Num.	Perc.
White (non-Hispanic)	219	27.55%
Black or African American (non-Hispanic)	531	66.79%
Native American	3	0.38%
Asian	1	0.13%
Other/Mixed	32	4.03%
Hispanic or Latino	9	1.13%

As of the 2020 United States census, there were 795 people, 444 households, and 299 families residing in the town.

=== 2010 Census data ===
As of the census of 2010, the population density was 114.2 inhabitants per square mile (44.1/km^{2}). The racial makeup of the town was 66.8% Black or African American, 31.3% White, 0.2% Native American, 0.3% from other races, and 1.4% from two or more races. 0.8% of the population were Hispanic or Latino of any race. The average household size was 2.49 and the average family size was 3.00.

=== 2000 Census data ===
As of the census of 2000, the population density was 106.1 inhabitants per square mile (41.0/km^{2}). The racial makeup of the town was 65.98% Black or African American, 32.32% White, 0.24% Native American, 0.24% from other races, and 1.22% from two or more races. 0.98% of the population were Hispanic or Latino of any race. The average household size was 2.59 and the average family size was 3.18.

The median income for a household in the town was $22,563, and the median income for a family was $35,417. Males had a median income of $29,688 versus $19,821 for females. The per capita income for the town was $12,586. 27.1% of the population and 27.4% of families were below the poverty line. 31.2% of those under the age of 18 and 23.2% of those 65 and older were living below the poverty line.

== Autaugaville Precinct or Division ==
Historical population
Census	Pop.	Note	%±
1870	2,387		—
1880	2,385		−0.1%
1890	2,025		−15.1%
1900	2,273		12.2%
1910	2,257		−0.7%
1920	2,411		6.8%
1930	2,405		−0.2%
1940	1,904		−20.8%
1950	1,641		−13.8%
1960	3,354		104.4%
1970	2,876		−14.3%
1980	3,163		10.0%
1990	2,983		−5.7%
2000	2,982		0.0%
2010	3,320		11.3%
U.S. Decennial Census

Autaugaville, the 2nd Beat of Autauga County was first tabulated in the 1870 census, though it first reported a population in 1850. In 1890, it became the 3rd Precinct (Autauga County) and continued to report to 1950. In 1960, Autaugaville precinct was changed to census division as part of a general reorganization of counties. After 1850, the other censuses that reported racial demographics for precincts and divisions (1860–70; 1930–40; 1960–2010) reported a Black majority in each instance.

== Notable people ==
- George "Wild Child" Butler, blues harmonica player, and vocalist
- Albert J. Pickett, planter, lawyer, and Alabama's first historian. Born in Anson County, North Carolina, but moved to Autaugaville with his father at the age of 8.
- Fernandez Ponds, U.S. Navy admiral
