= Charlotte Zwerin =

American documentary film director and editor

- Born: Charlotte Mitchell; August 15, 1931; Detroit, Michigan, U.S.
- Died: January 22, 2004 (aged 72); New York City, U.S.
- Occupation(s): Editor, director

Charlotte Zwerin (born Charlotte Mitchell, August 15, 1931 – January 22, 2004) was an American documentary film director and editor known for her solo work profiling artists and musicians, and as a pioneer of direct cinema and cinéma vérité, co-directing the documentaries Salesman (1969), Gimme Shelter (1970), and Running Fence (1978) with Albert and David Maysles.

== Biography ==
Zwerin grew up in Detroit, Michigan. She studied at Wayne State University and established a film club there which sparked her interest in documentary filmmaking. After this, she moved to New York City and found a job with Drew Associates, who were pioneers of direct cinema in the United States. Here, she met and began to work with Albert and David Maysles. Zwerin went onto edit and co-direct two of the canonical cinéma vérité documentaries with the Maysles brothers: Salesman and Gimme Shelter. Zwerin died of lung cancer in January 2004 at her home in Manhattan, at the age of 72.

== Career ==
Zwerin was an editor who worked on some of the canonical films of the cinéma vérité mode of documentary filmmaking including Salesman and Gimme Shelter. Salesman is concerned with following door-to-door Bible salesmen as they attempt to sell the greatest "best seller in the world." Gimme Shelter monitors the famous London rock band, The Rolling Stones, during their 1969 tour which culminated in the deadly Altamont Free Concert. The film has gained a great deal of notoriety, infamy and controversy for portraying a stabbing which resulted in the killing of Meredith Hunter at the hands of the Hells Angels, who were working as security for the concert.

Zwerin directed several other documentaries with subjects such as Thelonious Monk, "the brilliant and eccentric jazz pianist", the Armenian abstract painter Arshile Gorky, and the legendary singer Ella Fitzgerald, among many others. Her last film credit was as story consultant on the documentary film West 47th Street (2001).

Zwerin's work is often described as following the French documentary style of representation known as cinéma vérité. Her work is also emblematic of the direct cinema style.

== Filmography ==
- Salesman (1969)
- Gimme Shelter (1970)
- Running Fence (1978)
- De Kooning on de Kooning (1981)
- Arshile Gorky (1982)
- Islands (1987)
- Horowitz Plays Mozart (1987)
- Thelonious Monk: Straight, No Chaser (1989)
- Music for the Movies: Toru Takemitsu (1994)
- Sculpture of Spaces: Noguchi (1995)
- Ella Fitzgerald: Something to Live For (1999)
