= J. B. Lenoir =

American blues guitarist/singer-songwriter (1929–1967)

Background information
- Born: March 5, 1929; Monticello, Mississippi, U.S.
- Died: April 29, 1967 (aged 38) Urbana, Illinois, U.S.
- Genres: Blues; Chicago blues
- Occupations: Musician; songwriter
- Instruments: Guitar; harmonica; vocals
- Years active: 1950s–1967
- Labels: Parrot; Chess; Checker, J.O.B.; USA; Vee-Jay

J. B. Lenoir (/ləˈnɔːr/ luh-NORR; March 5, 1929 – April 29, 1967) was an American blues guitarist and singer-songwriter, active in the Chicago blues scene in the 1950s and 1960s. In The Encyclopedia of Popular Music he is described as both an "extrovert R&B man in the leopard-skin jacket who chanted infectious trifles" and a "thoughtful and intelligent writer of starkly honest blues songs."

== Life and career ==
Lenoir was born in Monticello, Mississippi. His full given name was simply "J. B."; the letters were not initials. Lenoir's guitar-playing father introduced him to the music of Blind Lemon Jefferson who became a major influence. During the early 1940s, Lenoir worked with the blues artists Sonny Boy Williamson II and Elmore James in New Orleans. He was later influenced by Arthur Crudup and Lightnin' Hopkins.

In 1949, he moved to Chicago, where Big Bill Broonzy helped introduce him to the blues community. He began to perform at local nightclubs, with musicians such as Memphis Minnie, Big Maceo Merriweather, and Muddy Waters, and became an important part of the city's blues scene. Lenoir began recording in 1951 for J.O.B. Records and Chess Records. His recording of "Korea Blues" was licensed to and released by Chess, as having been performed by J. B. and his Bayou Boys. His band included Sunnyland Slim, piano, "Baby Face" Leroy Foster, guitar and Alfred Wallace on drums.

During the 1950s, Lenoir recorded for various record labels in the Chicago area, including J.O.B., Chess, Parrot, and Checker. The labels often spelled his name as 'LENORE'. His more popular songs included "Let's Roll", "The Mojo" ["The Mojo Boogie"] (featuring saxophonist J. T. Brown) and the controversial "Eisenhower Blues", which Parrot Records forced him to re-record as "Tax Paying Blues."

Lenoir was known in the 1950s for his showmanship, particularly his zebra-patterned costumes, and his high-pitched vocals. He became an influential electric guitarist and songwriter and his penchant for social commentary distinguished him from many other blues men of the time. His most commercially successful and enduring release was "Mamma Talk to Your Daughter", recorded for Parrot in 1954, which reached number 11 on the Billboard R&B chart and was later recorded by many other blues and rock musicians. In the later 1950s, recording for Checker, he wrote several more blues standards, including "Don't Dog Your Woman" and "Don't Touch My Head!!!" (1956).

Lenoir and Willie Dixon got together in 1962 in Lenoir's home and recorded 11 songs. Dixon taped these as an audition tape for Lenoir to go to Europe as part of the large blues packages then dominating the European blues scene. According to the album's liner notes, they were sitting down together, relaxed and private, talking, jiving and singing in a way that differs from a studio or club date.

In 1963, he recorded for USA Records as J. B. Lenoir and his African Hunch Rhythm, having developed an interest in African percussion. In 1965 and 1966, Willie Dixon recorded him playing acoustic guitar with only the drummer Fred Below accompanying him, which was unusual at the time for a Chicago blues session. German blues promoter, Horst Lippman released these recordings on two albums, Alabama Blues and Down in Mississippi inspired by the Civil Rights Movement and Free Speech Movement. Here, he again spoke his mind with songs such as "Alabama March", "Vietnam Blues" and "(Every Child in Mississippi is) Born Dead".

Lenoir toured Europe and performed with the American Folk Blues Festival, most notably in the United Kingdom in 1965.

== Death and legacy ==
Lenoir died on April 29, 1967, in Urbana, Illinois, at the age 38, of injuries he had suffered in a car crash three weeks earlier.

John Mayall paid tribute to the fallen bluesman with the songs "I'm Gonna Fight for You, J. B." and "The Death of J. B. Lenoir", though in both songs, Mayall mispronounces Lenoir's name as /lɛnˈwɑːr/. The 2003 documentary film The Soul of a Man, directed by Wim Wenders as the second installment of Martin Scorsese's series The Blues, explored Lenoir's career, together with those of Skip James and Blind Willie Johnson. In 2011, Lenoir was inducted into the Blues Hall of Fame.

== Discography ==
=== Selected albums ===
- The Chronological J.B. Lenoir, 1951-1954. 23 J.O.B. tracks, Classics (2005) and Paula (1991)
- J.B. Lenoir, 28 Chess tracks, two Chess LPs, includes the album Natural Man (1976)
- His J. O. B. Recordings, 1951-1954. 21 tracks, Flyright Records (1989)
- The Chronological J. B. Lenoir, 1955-1956. 19 tracks, Classics (2007)
- I Wanna Play A Little While: The Complete Singles Collection 1950-1960. Two CDs, 41 tracks, Jasmine (2015)
- The Mojo -The JOB/ USA/ Vee Jay Recordings. 22 tracks, P-Vine (2004)
- The Mojo Boogie: with Sunnyland Slim, J.O.B./ Cobra Recordings. 22 tracks P-Vine (1990)
- Mama Watch Your Daughter 19 Parrot & Chess recordings from 1954 to 1958, Charly Blues Masterworks Vol. 47 (1993)
- Alabama Blues 12 tracks, L&R and German CBS LP (1965); see Vietnam Blues below for CD release.
- Down in Mississippi 12 tracks, L&R Records LP (1981); see Vietnam Blues below for CD release.
- J.B. Lenoir & Willie Dixon – One Of These Mornings, 11 tracks recorded in J.B.'s home. JSP LP (1986)
- One of These Mornings. 16 tracks, all 11 from Willie Dixon's recordings in J.B.'s home plus five studio tracks. JSP CD (2003)
- Vietnam Blues: The Complete L + R Recordings; (Alabama Blues and Down in Mississippi). 24 tracks, Evidence CD (1995)
- J. B. Lenoir, collection of recordings, featuring posthumous interview by John Mayall with Ella Louise Lenoir. 15 tracks, Polydor/Crusade (1970)

=== Singles ===
- "My Baby Told Me" / "Korea Blues" (Chess 1449, 1/51)
- "Deep In Debt Blues" / "Carrie Lee" (Chess 1463, 6/51)
- "Let's Roll" / "People Are Meddling (In Our Affairs)" (J.O.B. 112, 7/52)
- "The Mountain" / "How Much More" (J.O.B. 1008, 11/52)
- "The Mojo" ["The Mojo Boogie"] / "How Can I Leave" (J.O.B. 1012, 5/53)
- "I'll Die Tryin'" / "I Want My Baby" (J.O.B. 1016, 10/53)
- "(I Wanna) Play A Little While" / "Louise" (J.O.B. 1102, 4/54)
- "I'm In Korea" / "Eisenhower Blues" (later pressings had "Tax Paying Blues" as the B-side) (Parrot 802, 4/54)
- "Mamma Talk To Your Daughter" / "Man Watch Your Woman" (Parrot 809, 1/55)
- "Mama Your Daughter Is Going To Miss Me" / "What Have I Done" (Parrot 814, 5/55)
- "Fine Girls" / "I Lost My Baby" (Parrot 821, 11/55)
- "Let Me Die With The One I Love" / "If I Give My Love To You?" (Checker 844, 9/56)
- "Don't Touch My Head!!!" / "I've Been Down So Long" (Checker 856, 2/57)
- "What About Your Daughter?" / "Five Years" (Checker 874, 9/57)
- "Daddy Talk To Your Son" / "She Don't Know" (Checker 901, 12/58)
- "Back Door" / "Lou Ella" (Shad 5012, 1959)
- "Oh Baby" / "Do What I Say" (Vee Jay 352, 1960)
- "I Sing Um The Way I Feel" / "I Feel So Good" (USA 744, 1963)
- "Mojo Boogie" [1960 acoustic version] / "I Don't Care What Nobody Say" (Blue Horizon 1004, 1966)

=== Compilation albums ===
- Natural Man (Chess, 1970)
- Chess Blues Masters (Chess, 1976; reissued in 1984) 2-LP
- The Parrot Sessions 1954–55 (Relic, 1988)
- Alabama Blues: Rare and Intimate Recordings (Snapper, 2004)
