= Thelonious Monk: Straight, No Chaser =

1988 documentary film by Charlotte Zwerin

- Theatrical release poster by Bill Gold
- Directed by: Charlotte Zwerin
- Produced by: Bruce Ricker; Charlotte Zwerin
- Starring: Jimmy Cleveland; Harry Colomby; John Coltrane; Ray Copeland; Nica de Koenigswarter; Johnny Griffin
- Production company: Malpaso Productions
- Distributed by: Warner Bros.
- Release date: October 20, 1988
- Running time: 90 minutes
- Country: United States
- Language: English

Thelonious Monk: Straight, No Chaser is a 1988 American documentary film about the life of bebop pianist and composer Thelonious Monk. Directed by Charlotte Zwerin, it features live performances by Monk and his group, and posthumous interviews with friends and family. The film was created when a large amount of archived footage of Monk was found in the 1980s.

The film, made by Clint Eastwood's production company Malpaso Productions, is distributed by Warner Bros. Pictures; Eastwood served as executive producer.

== Production ==
After meeting on the streets of New York, director and cinematographer Christian Blackwood mentioned to film producer Bruce Ricker that he and his brother had done some work on jazz, referring to a one-hour film special on Thelonious Monk that only aired once in Germany. After Ricker saw the footage, calling them "the Dead Sea Scrolls of jazz", he suggested that they use the footage as the focus of a new documentary. Ricker brought in Charlotte Zwerin to help with the production of the film, which led to four producers; Ricker, Zwerin, and the Blackwood brothers. While they originally planned to enlist Monk for the film, he was not well enough to approach and his failing health led to his eventual death of a stroke on February 17, 1982. Blackwood filmed the funeral while Zwerin and Ricker planned to make a deal with the Monk estate. Monk's death brought up complications on the film's production, however, as the absence of a will and the fact that New York did not recognize common law marriages led to a lengthy process before Monk's children could become the executors of the estate. Before any deals could be made by Zwerin and Ricker, the rights to Monk's life story were bought by "two young men, with a substantial chunk of money and no prior film experience", which delayed production of the film. After the delay Zwerin and Ricker struggled to fund the project and only raised enough money for a one-hour television program with limited post-TV distribution potential. Ricker eventually came into contact with Clint Eastwood and after finding out his appreciation of jazz and the bebop genre asked if he was interested in helping with production of the film. Clint Eastwood agreed to have his production studio Malpaso produce the film and gave them the budget needed to finish the film. Old footage from different network companies was used, along with the footage from the Blackwood brothers' previous work. New footage was also shot, featuring interviews with his son, Thelonious Monk III, tenor saxophonist Charlie Rouse, and other family and friends of Monk.

== Footage origins ==
After being commissioned by West German public television in 1967 to create a one-hour special film on Thelonious Monk, director and cinematographer Christian Blackwood and his brother Michael Blackwood closely followed Monk for six months as he travelled around New York, Atlanta, and Europe. From this project arose thirteen hours of outtakes, showing live performances by Monk and his band along with the only footage of Monk offstage. The footage was stored for almost two decades after the one-hour special, which was only broadcast in Germany, was aired.

== Reception and legacy ==
On Rotten Tomatoes, it holds a score of 100% based on 7 reviews with a mean of 8.4 of a possible 10. Thelonious Monk: Straight, No Chaser was first shown at the New York film Festival in October 1989 and opened to strong reviews. A New York Times review claims it as "some of the most valuable jazz ever shot" as the close up shots of Monk's hands on the piano reveal his unusual technique. The film is generally praised for giving an intimate view of the otherwise reserved Monk.

In 2017, the film was selected for preservation in the United States National Film Registry by the Library of Congress as being "culturally, historically, or aesthetically significant".

On June 17, 2025, the film received a Blu-Ray release as part of The Criterion Collection.
