= Rooster Blues =

- Parent company: Bottled MaJic Music
- Founded: 1980
- Founder: Jim O'Neal
- Distributors: Rounder Records, Redeye Distribution
- Genre: Blues
- Country of origin: U.S.
- Location: Memphis, Tennessee

Rooster Blues is an American independent record label founded in 1980.

The label is dedicated to blues music from the Mississippi Delta. Rooster Blues was co-founded by Jim O'Neal in Chicago, and initially released 14 albums by South Side blues musicians. In 1986, O'Neal moved the label to Clarksdale, Mississippi and began focusing on the area's Delta blues performers. Lonnie Pitchford and Lonnie Shields helped in the construction of the new recording studio facilities.

Over the next 12 years, Rooster Blues released albums by Booba Barnes, Carey Bell, Eddy Clearwater, Willie Cobbs, Larry Davis, John Littlejohn, Lonnie Pitchford, Lonnie Shields, Magic Slim, Super Chikan, James Thomas, and Valerie Wellington.

In 1998, the label suspended operations, and in 1999 it was sold to Bottled MaJic Music. However, in 2000, Rooster Blues resumed operations and celebrated its 20th anniversary by releasing Willie King's Freedom Creek, as well as reissuing some classic recordings such as Grand Slam by Magic Slim.

== See also ==
- List of record labels
