= Johnny Williams (blues musician) =

American blues guitarist and singer (1906–2006)

- Also known as: Uncle Johnny Williams
- Born: May 15, 1906; Alexandria, Louisiana, U.S.
- Died: March 6, 2006 (aged 99) Chicago, Illinois, U.S.
- Genres: Blues
- Instrument(s): Vocals, guitar
- Years active: 1930s–1959

Johnny Williams (May 15, 1906 – March 6, 2006) was an American blues guitar player and singer based in Chicago, who was one of the first of the new generation of electric blues players to record after World War II.

== Early life and career ==
Williams was born in Alexandria, Louisiana, to parents who were both musicians. He was raised in Houston, Texas, and moved to Belzoni, Mississippi, to live with his uncle Anthony Williams after his mother died around 1917. There he met local musicians such as the Chatmon brothers and Charley Patton (with whom his uncle played) and learned to play the guitar. After traveling north during the 1920s, he returned to Belzoni around 1930, where he occasionally played locally.

Moving to Chicago in 1938, he worked at first in the defense industry and later for Oscar Mayer. By 1943 he was playing in clubs in the evenings while working as a meat packer in the daytime. He worked with Theodore "Hound Dog" Taylor around 1944. In 1945 he lost the end of a finger in a meat grinder and gave up playing the guitar for a year, until he saw Blind Arvella Gray, who was missing two fingers from his left hand, playing on Maxwell Street, and learned to play the guitar without the missing finger. In the late 1940s Williams was once more playing on Maxwell Street and in clubs, often working with his cousin, the mandolin player Johnny Young; with the harmonica player Snooky Pryor and the guitarists Floyd Jones and Moody Jones; or with Little Walter. He joined the musicians' union around this time. He acquired the nickname Uncle Johnny, by which he was known among his blues associates for the rest of his life.

== Recordings ==
Williams's first recordings were made in 1947 with Johnny Young and resulted in one of the two singles issued on the Ora-Nelle label. On one side of the record Young sang "Money Taking Woman" accompanied by Williams; on the other side Williams sang "Worried Man Blues". In December 1948 Young and Williams were joined by Snooky Pryor to record a single for the Planet label.

Williams continued to work in music into the 1950s, eventually joining Big Boy Spires's Rocket Four, with whom he had his final recording session, for Chance Records, in 1953. The session resulted in a single released under Spires's name, but the two tracks on which Williams sang were unreleased until the 1970s.

== Later career and death ==
After 1953 Williams continued to work with Hound Dog Taylor and others, but he stopped playing blues in 1959 after a religious conversion and joined the Baptist church, becoming a deacon in the early 1960s.

Williams died in Chicago on March 6, 2006, at the age of 99.

The blues musicians John Lee Hooker and Baby Boy Warren have also used the name Johnny Williams.

== Sources ==
- Rowe, M. (1981). Chicago Blues: The City and the Music. New York: Da Capo Press. ISBN 978-0306801457
