= Hip Linkchain =

American blues guitarist, singer and songwriter (1936–1989)

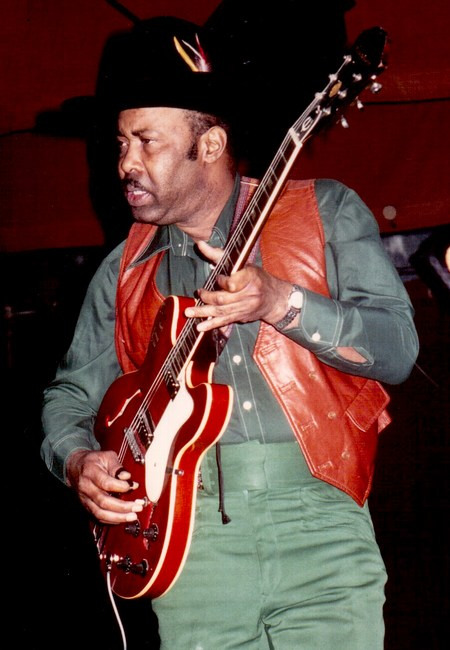
- Linkchain on stage in France.

Background information
- Born: Willie Richard; November 10, 1936; Jackson, Mississippi, United States
- Died: February 13, 1989 (aged 52) Chicago, Illinois, United States
- Genres: Chicago blues, electric blues
- Occupations: Guitarist, singer, songwriter
- Instruments: Guitar, vocals
- Years active: Mid-1950s–1989
- Labels: Evidence, Teardrop, Storyville, others

Willie Richard (November 10, 1936 – February 13, 1989), who performed as Hip Linkchain, was an American Chicago blues guitarist, singer and songwriter.

His best-known numbers were "Change My Blues" and "That Will Never Do". AllMusic described him as a "solid, no-frills bluesman". Another music journalist noted, "his composer's talents put him much above the average bluesmen". Linkchain worked with Lester Davenport, Pinetop Perkins, Tyrone Davis, and Little Walter.

== Life and career ==
He was born in Jackson, Mississippi. His stage name was in deference to his father's nickname, Linkchain, which was due to his habit of sporting logging chains around his neck, and the boy's childhood nickname, Hipstick. He was inspired by the blues playing of Sonny Boy Williamson II, Elmore James and Little Milton, all of whom Linkchain heard in the Mississippi Delta, before he relocated to Chicago, Illinois, in 1954. He was raised in Louise, Mississippi, and picked cotton before his move north. Linkchain found regular employment playing blues guitar in the clubs of Chicago throughout the 1950s and 1960s, working at various times with the harmonica players Lester Davenport, Dusty Brown, and Little Willy Foster.

By 1959, Linkchain had formed his own band, the Chicago Twisters, with Tyrone Davis as frontman. Linkchain recorded sporadically, mainly for small independent record labels based in Chicago, and a handful of his singles were released in the 1960s. His debut album, Change My Blues, with Pinetop Perkins (piano), Rich Kirch (guitar), Right Hand Frank Bandy (bass) and Fred Grady (drums), was released by the small Teardrop Records in 1983.

His best-known album, Airbusters, was originally released by the Netherlands-based label Black Magic in 1988, not long before he died. It was later reissued by Evidence Records.

Linkchain died of mesothelioma cancer, on February 13, 1989, in Chicago. In 2013 the Killer Blues Project placed a headstone for Linkchain (Willie Richard) at Restvale Cemetery in Alsip, Illinois.

== Discography ==
=== Albums ===
Year	Title	Record label
1983	Change My Blues	Teardrop Records
1993	Airbusters	Evidence Records
1996	I Am on My Way	Storyville Records
1999	Jimmy and Hip Live! †	Rumble Records
2007	Westside Chicago Blues Guitar	P-Vine Records

† Jimmy and Hip Live! was a live album, recorded with Jimmy Dawkins in Champaign, Illinois, in 1982.

== See also ==
- List of Chicago blues musicians
- List of electric blues musicians
