= Lester Davenport =

American blues harmonica player and singer (1932–2009)

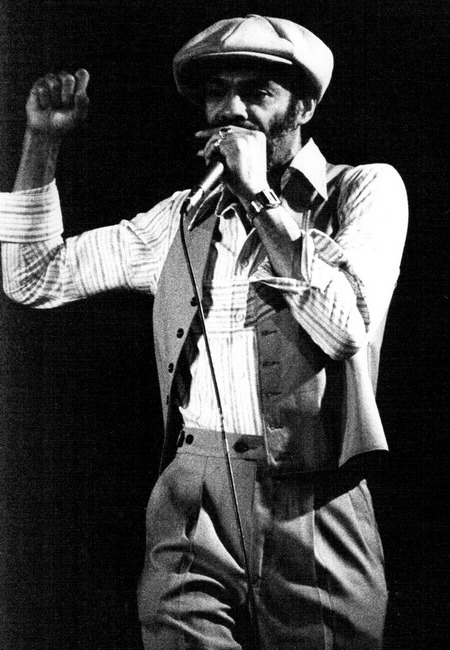
Davenport in 1979

Lester "Mad Dog" Davenport (January 16, 1932 – March 17, 2009), was an American Chicago blues harmonica player and singer.

Born in Tchula, Mississippi, Davenport moved to Chicago, Illinois, United States, when he was 14. There he played with Arthur Spires, Snooky Pryor, Dusty Brown, and Homesick James and then worked with Bo Diddley, with whom he played harmonica on a 1955 Chess Records session. He led his own group in the 1960s while working during the day as a paint sprayer. In the 1980s he was the harmonica player for the Indiana group the Kinsey Report.

In July 1994, Wolf Records released the album Chicago Blues Session, Vol. 11, by Maxwell Street Jimmy Davis, recorded in 1988 and 1989. The collection included Davenport on harmonica and Kansas City Red playing the drums.

Davenport released his first album under his own name in 1992 and recorded a follow-up, I Smell a Rat, in 2002.

Davenport died in March 2009 in Chicago, from prostate cancer, at the age of 77. In 2018 the Killer Blues Headstone Project placed a headstone for him at Burr Oak Cemetery in Alsip, Illinois.

== Discography ==
- When the Blues Hit You (Earwig Music, 1992)
- I Smell a Rat (Delmark Records, 2002)
