= Little Willy Foster =

American blues harmonicist, and singer-songwriter (1922–1987)

- Also known as: Little Willie Foster
- Born: Willy Foster; April 20, 1922; Dublin, Mississippi, United States
- Origin: Chicago, Illinois, United States
- Died: November 25, 1987 (aged 65) Chicago, Illinois
- Genres: Chicago blues
- Occupations: Harmonicist, singer, songwriter
- Instruments: Harmonica, guitar, vocals
- Years active: Mid-1940s–1973
- Labels: Parrot, Cobra

Willy Foster (April 20, 1922 (Note: There is disagreement between usually reliable sources, such as AllMusic, which gives his date of birth as April 5, 1922, and other sources, such as an encyclopedia, another published work, and an online discography, which concur on April 20, 1922.) – November 25, 1987), known as Little Willy Foster (or Little Willie Foster), was an American Chicago blues harmonicist, and singer-songwriter.

== Biography ==
Foster was born in Dublin, Mississippi, to Major Foster and Rosie Brown and was raised by his father (a local musician) on a plantation about ten miles south of Clarksdale after his mother died when he was aged five. Willy worked the fields from an early age and had little formal education. His father taught him to play the family's piano, and Willy later taught himself to master both the guitar and the harmonica. By 1942, he was working in Clarksdale and relocated to Chicago the next year. He played the blues around the city and teamed up with Floyd Jones, Lazy Bill Lucas, and his cousin Leroy Foster. Having befriended Big Walter Horton, Foster learned to play the harmonica in Horton's Chicago blues style. Beginning in the mid-1940s, this led to periodic work for Foster on Maxwell Street and in clubs in the city for over a decade. He also worked during this time in a band with Homesick James, Moody Jones and Floyd Jones.

In January 1955, Foster recorded two sides for Parrot Records, his own compositions "Falling Rain Blues" and "Four Day Jump", with accompaniment by Lucas, Jones and Eddie Taylor. He reportedly incurred the displeasure of the record label's owner, Al Benson, for reporting him to the American Federation of Musicians for underpaid dues on the recordings. In March 1957, Foster was back in a recording studio in Chicago, where he recorded two more of his songs, "Crying the Blues" and "Little Girl" for the Cobra label. Regarding the former, AllMusic noted that it "reflected both his emotional singing and his wailing, swooping harmonica."

From this point onwards, his personal life started to degenerate. Attending a house party, Foster was accidentally shot in the head by a woman playing with a handgun. The shooting caused partial paralysis and severely affected his ability to speak. He made a slow recovery but rarely played in public thereafter. In January 1974, Foster voluntarily surrendered himself to the local police after he shot and killed his roommate. Pleading self-defense and impairment of judgement due to his brain injury, he was found not guilty by reason of insanity and was sent to a state hospital in 1975.

Foster died of kidney cancer in the Illinois Insane Asylum, Chicago on November 25, 1987, aged 65. In 2024 the Killer Blues Headstone Project placed the headstone for him at Mt. Glenwood Cemetery in Willow Springs, Illinois.

His four released recordings are available on numerous compilation albums, issued both before and after his death.

== Confusion ==
The variant spelling of his first name is due to the different spellings on his two singles.

He is not to be confused with another blues harmonica player, Willie James Foster (September 19, 1921 or 1922 – May 20, 2001).

== Singles discography ==
Year	A-side (Songwriter)	B-side (Songwriter)	Record label	Notes
1955	"Falling Rain Blues" (Foster)	"Four Day Jump" (Foster)	Parrot / Blue Lake	Accompanied by Lazy Bill Lucas, Floyd Jones, Eddie Taylor
1957	"Crying the Blues" (Foster)	"Little Girl" (Foster)	Cobra	Accompanied by Lazy Bill Lucas, Floyd Jones, Eddie Taylor, Triolue High

== See also ==
- List of Chicago blues musicians
