= Eddie King (musician) =

American Chicago blues musician

- Born: Edward Lewis Davis Milton; April 21, 1938; Talladega, Alabama, United States
- Died: March 14, 2012 (aged 73) Peoria, Illinois, United States
- Genres: Chicago blues, electric blues
- Occupation(s): Guitarist, singer, songwriter
- Instrument(s): Guitar, vocals
- Years active: Late 1950s–2012
- Labels: J.O.B. Records, Black Magic, Roesch

Eddie King (April 21, 1938 – March 14, 2012) was an American Chicago blues guitarist, singer and songwriter. Living Blues magazine stated that "King is a potent singer and player with a raw, gospel-tinged voice and an aggressive, thick-toned guitar sound". He was noted as creating a "straightforward style, after Freddie King and Little Milton".

== Life and career ==
King was born Edward Lewis Davis Milton in Talladega, Alabama. His parents were both musical: his father played the guitar, and his mother was a gospel singer. King learned basic guitar riffs from watching from outside the window of local blues clubs. He was inspired by the playing of Muddy Waters, Howlin' Wolf, and Little Walter. He grew up playing alongside Luther Allison, Magic Sam, Junior Wells, Eddie C. Campbell, and Freddie King.

He relocated to Chicago in 1954, and his diminutive stature and the influence of B.B. King led to his being referred to as Little Eddie King. Given a break by Little Mack Simmons, he first recorded under the tutelage of Willie Dixon and, in 1960, played on several tracks recorded by Sonny Boy Williamson II. He also recorded with Detroit Junior. Also in 1960, King recorded a single, "Shakin' Inside" backed with "Love You Baby", released by J.O.B. Records. He then played guitar backing Koko Taylor, a role he undertook for two decades. He formed Eddie King & the Kingsmen in 1969. King moved to Peoria, Illinois, in the early 1980s. After the early 1990s, his backing ensemble was known as the Swamp Bees, and his music incorporated Chicago blues, country blues, blues shouter, and soul music.

His debut album, The Blues Has Got Me (1987), was issued by the Netherlands-based record label Black Magic and later re-released by Double Trouble. It featured one of his sisters, Mae Bee May, on vocals.

In 1997, King recorded Another Cow's Dead, which won a Blues Music Award for Best Comeback Blues Album. It was arranged by Lou Marini.

His songwriting credits include "Kitty Kat", described by one music journalist as "hilarious".

King died in Peoria on March 14, 2012, at the age of 73. In October 2012, the Killer Blues Headstone Project, a nonprofit organization, placed a headstone on his previously unmarked grave at the Lutheran Cemetery in Peoria.

== Discography ==
With Sonny Boy Williamson

- The Real Folk Blues (Chess, 1947–64 [1966])

== See also ==
- J.O.B. Records discography
- List of Chicago blues musicians
- List of electric blues musicians
