= J.O.B. Records discography =

This is a list of many of J.O.B. Records releases.

== Initial releases beginning in 1949 ==
- 101 – Snooky Pryor – "Raisin' Sand" / "Boogy Fool"
- 102 – Sunnyland Slim – "Down Home Child" / "Sunnyland Special"
- 103 – The Fat Man – "You've Gotta Stop This Mess" / "Glad I Don't Worry No More"
- 110 – John Brim – "Trouble In The Morning" / "Humming Blues"
- 112 – J. B. Lenoir – "People Are Meddling (In Our Affairs)" / "Let's Roll"
- 114 – John Lee – "Rhythm Rockin' Boogie" / "Knockin' On Eula Mae's Door"
- 115 – Snooky Pryor – "Going Back On The Road" / "I'm Getting Tired"
- 116 – Johnny Shines – "Rambling" / "Cool Driver"
- 117 – Grace Brim – "Hospitality Blues" / "Man Around My Door"

== In early 1951 the label went to a 1000 numbering system ==
- 1001 – Floyd Jones – "Big World" / "Dark Road"
- 1002 – Baby Face Leroy w Sunnyland Slim – "Pet Rabbit" / "Louella"
- 1003 – Sunnyland Slim – "Leaving Your Town" / "Mary Lee"
- 1004 – Roy Sneed – "Don't Make Me Go To Bed" / "Too Young For Love"
- 1005 – Eddie Boyd – "It's Miserable To Be Alone" / "I'm Pleading"
- 1006 – Henry Palmer and his Boys – "Scrunch" / "Jump Boy"
- 1007 – Eddie Boyd – "Five Long Years" / "Blue Coat Man"
- 1008 – J. B. Lenoir – "The Mountain" / "How Much More"
- 1009 – Eddie Boyd – "It's Miserable To Be Alone" / "I'm Pleading"
- 1010 – Johnny Shines – "Evening Sun" / "Brutal Hearted Woman"
- 1011 – John Brim – "Drinking Woman" / "Overnight"
- 1012 – J. B. Lenoir – "The Mojo" / "How Can I Live"
- 1013 – Floyd Jones – "On The Road Again" / "Skinny Mama"
- 1014 – Snooky Pryor – "Cryin' Shame" / "Eight, Nine, Ten"
- 1015 – Little Hudson's Red Devil Trio – "Rough Treatment" / "I'm Looking For A Woman"
- 1016 – J. B. Lenoir – "I'll Die Trying" / "I Want My Baby"
- 1101 – Memphis Minnie – "Kissing In The Dark" / "A World Of Trouble"
- 1102 – J. B. Lenoir – "Louise" / "Play A Little While"
- 1105 – Sunnyland Slim – "Shake It Baby" / "Woman Trouble"
- 1107 – Robert Lockwood, Jr. – "Sweet Woman From Maine" / "Aw Aw Baby"
- 1111 – Heavenly Kings – "Lord Free My Soul" / "Any Way You Bless Me Lord"
- 1113 – Earl N. Pugh – "Never Had A Dream" / "Jealous Of My Shadow"
- 1114 – Eddie Boyd – "Save Her Doctor" / "I Love You"
- 1122 – Eddie King – "Shakin' Inside" / "Love You Baby"
- 1126 – Snooky Pryor – "Boogie Twist" / "Uncle Sam Don't Take My Man"
- 1127 – Willie Cobbs – "Too Sad" / "Come On Home"

== Releases on the unrelated Louisiana-based label (1950) ==
- 100 – Stick Horse Hammond – "Gamblin' Man" / "Alberta"
- 105 – Stick Horse Hammond – "Highway 51" / "Too Late Baby"

== See also ==
- J.O.B. Records
