= Chance Records =

Chicago-based 1950s music label

- Founded: 1950
- Founder: Art Sheridan
- Status: Inactive since 1954
- Genre: Blues, jazz, doo-wop, gospel
- Country of origin: United States
- Location: Chicago, Illinois

Chance Records was a Chicago-based label founded in 1950 by Art Sheridan. It specialized in blues, jazz, doo-wop, and gospel.

Among the acts who recorded for Chance were The Flamingos, The Moonglows, Homesick James, J. B. Hutto, Brother John Sellers, and Schoolboy Porter. In addition, Chance released three singles by John Lee Hooker and made a coordinated issue of the first singles by Jimmy Reed and The Spaniels with the brand-new and still tiny Vee-Jay Records.

The company closed down at the end of 1954. Sheridan became one of the financial backers of Vee-Jay.

== History ==
Chance Records opened for business in September 1950. Initially the company was housed at Sheridan's American Record Distributors, 2011 South Michigan Avenue in Chicago. Among the first artists to record for the company were the Al Sims Trio, an uptown blues group, and a combo led by tenor saxophonist John "Schoolboy" Porter, who had developed a vigorous R&B style in the Cootie Williams band. Porter's rendition of "Tennessee Waltz," a much-covered hit in 1950, sold well enough that Sheridan's pressing plant, Armour Plastics, couldn't meet the demand and many copies were pressed by RCA Victor. Porter would be a steady contributor until he left Chicago in 1952.

In 1951, however, the company ran into big trouble with the American Federation of Musicians on account of employing non-Union personnel on one of Schoolboy Porter's sessions. The company actually lost its license to record with Union musicians for one year, although Sheridan was able to work in a few sessions by gospel groups, which in those days were almost entirely non-Union. He would remain persona non grata with Musicians Union Local 208 for many years.

While restricted from making new recordings, Sheridan astutely picked up items for release from many small labels: the debut session by jazz pianist John Young, Little Walter's very first session, a long out-of-print single by Sunnyland Slim, and three John Lee Hooker 78s, all released under the low-effort pseudonym John L. Booker.

Chance quickly recovered when the ban ended in May 1952, and Sheridan moved both the record company and his distribution operation to 1151 East 47th Street. Added to the roster were blues singer Brother John Sellers, jazz trumpeter King Kolax, down-home blues guitarist Homesick James, and flamboyant blues shouter Jo Jo Adams. In the fall, bassist Al Smith took over as leader of a house band that featured tenor saxophonist Red Holloway, guitarist Lefty Bates, and drummer Vernel Fournier; among the first singers they backed was Bobby Prince.

Chance hit its peak in 1953. A collaboration with Joe Brown's JOB Records brought a new release by Homesick James, including his signature number "Homesick" a release by Arthur "Big Boy" Spires, and further tracks by Sunnyland Slim and Johnny Shines that were not released till later. The company's blues roster grew further to include Lazy Bill Lucas and Willie Nix. Singer/guitarist Rudy Greene also recorded for Chance.

Sheridan made a significant investment in doo-wop, signing two of the two top groups of the period, The Flamingos and The Moonglows. The established R&B combo led by Tommy Dean made a session, as did the jazz groups of pianist Jimmy Binkley and trumpeter Conte Candoli. In the summer, Sheridan opened a new subsidiary called Sabre at 1225 East 47th Street to handle some of his expanding catalog. Two doo-wop groups that Sheridan signed, the Five Echoes, and the Five Blue Notes, recorded exclusively for the new subsidiary.

In June 1953, Sheridan lent a hand to an emerging outfit from Gary, Indiana called Vee-Jay, which needed marketing and distribution help on its first releases by bluesman Jimmy Reed and the vocal group The Spaniels. Each was given a parallel release on Chance.

In 1954, the company recorded The Moonglows, The Flamingos, along with a new vocal group called the Five Chances. It picked up what was probably its highest-profile gospel group, the Famous Boyer Brothers. A single by blues shouter Freddie Hall came from the tiny Ebony label, run by J. Mayo Williams. A major new blues signing was J. B. Hutto, who made his recording debut for Chance.

However, in June 1954, Al Smith and his corps of studio musicians moved to Vee-Jay. Sabre Records made its last release in August. Sheridan wound Chance Records down in December 1954, becoming a behind-the-scenes investor in the newer company. Ewart Abner, who had been Sheridan's right-hand man at Chance, went to work for Vee-Jay in early 1955.

== Series ==
On its main 1100 series, Chance issues ran almost consecutively from 1100 to 1165, for a total of 63 releases. A 5000 series that Sheridan established for gospel records ran from 5000 to 5009, for 10 releases. In addition, there was a 3000 series for pop releases, which finished at 3021; 21 have been accounted for, An abortive effort to start a subsidiary in 1952 led to a single release on Meteor 100 (not to be confused with the Bihari brothers' Meteor label).

== Legacy ==
Quite a few Chance and Sabre artists, ranging from the Famous Boyer Brothers to Tommy Dean to King Kolax to the Five Echoes, resurfaced at Vee-Jay. Rock and roll historian Charlie Gillett noted that Chance "might have done well with rock 'n' roll, given its roster," but the company closed too soon. The Flamingos went to Parrot and then to Checker and The Moonglows to Chess.

== Releases ==
Catalog #	Artist	A-side	B-side
1100	Arnold Jones	"Some Time"	"Yesterdays"
1101	John "Schoolboy" Porter	"I'll Never Smile Again"	"Schoolboy's Boogie"
1102	Al Sims Trio, Sam Dawson Vocal	"Moody Woman"	"I Wonder Baby"
1103	John "Schoolboy" Porter	"Tennessee Waltz Part I"	"Part II"
1104	John "Schoolboy" Porter	"Nevertheless"	"Walk Heavy"
1105	John "Schoolboy" Porter	"Kayron"	"Deep Purple"
1106	Clyde Wright	"Whispering Grass"	"Hear My Call"
1107	Wally Hayes Combo	"The Flame"	"Night Beat"
1107	The Chanceteers	"The Flame"	"Night Beat"
1108	John Lee Booker (sic)	"Talkin' Boogie"	"Miss Lorraine"
1109	Henry Green	"Storm thru Mississippi"	"Strange Things"
1110	John Lee Booker (sic)	"I Love to Boogie"	"Graveyard Blues"
1111	John "Schoolboy" Porter	"Top Hat"	"Stairway to the Stars"
1112	Clyde Wright	"I May Be Down"	"I'm Nobody's Trick"
1114	John "Schoolboy" Porter	"Soft Shoulders"	"Rollin' Along"
1115	Delta Joe (sic)	""4 O'Clock Blues""	"I Cried"
1116	Little Walter J.	"That's Alright"	"Just Keep Loving Her"
1117	John "Schoolboy" Porter	"Sentimental Journey"	"Fire Dome"
1119	John "Schoolboy" Porter	"Break Thru"	"Junco Partner"
1120	Johnny Sellers	"Josie Jones"	"Rock Me in the Cradle"
1121	James Williamson	"Lonesome Ole Train"	"Farmers Blues"
1122	John L Booker (sic)	"609 Boogie"	"Road Trouble"
1123	Johnny Sellers	"Blues This Ain't No Place for You"	"Mighty Lonesome"
1124	Al Smith	"Smoke Gets in Your Eyes"	"Slow Mood"
1125	Jack Ross	"Close to You"	"Lonely Heart"
1126	Four Shades of Rhythm	"Yesterdays"	"So There"
1127	Dr. Jojo Adams	"Didn't I Tell You"	"I've Got a Crazy Baby"
1128	Bobby Prince	"Tell Me Why, Why, Why"	"I Want to Hold You"
1129	Skippy Brown	"So Many Days"	"Tale of Woe"
1130	Lou Blackwell	"How Blue the Night"	"I'm Blue without You"
1131	James Williamson	"Homesick"	"The Woman I Love"
1132	John "Schoolboy" Porter	"Small Squall"	"Lonely Wail"
1133	The Flamingos	"If I Can't Have You"	"Someday, Someway"
1134	Jimmy Binkley	"Hey, Hey, Sugar Ray"	"Midnite Wail"
1135	Jimmy Binkley	"Brand New Rockin' Chair"	"Finance Man"
1136	Barrel House Blott	"Brand New Man"	"Chicks Going Crazy"
1137	Arthur "Big Boy" Spires	"Which One Do I Love"	"About to Lose My Mind"
1138	Johnny Sellers	"Mirror Blues"	"Newport News"
1139	Rudy Green	"Love Is a Pain"	"No Need of Your Crying"
1140	The Flamingos	"Hurry Home Baby"	"That's My Desire"
1141	The Spaniels	"Baby, It's You"	"Bounce"
1142	Jimmy Reed	"High and Lonesome"	"Roll and Rhumba"
1143	Bertha Henderson	"Rock, Daddy, Rock"	"Tears in My Eyes"
1144	Johnny Young	"You Go to My Head"	"Memories of You"
1145	The Flamingos	"Carried Away"	"Golden Teardrops"
1146	Rudy Green	"The Letter"	"It's You I Love"
1147	The Moonglows	"Whistle My Love"	"Baby Please"
1148	Lazy Bill	"She Got Me Walkin"	"I Had a Dream"
1149	The Flamingos	"Plan for Love"	"You Ain't Ready"
1150	The Moonglows	"Just a Lonely Christmas"	"Hey Santa Claus"
1151	Rudy Green	"I Had a Feeling"	"Meet Me Baby"
1152	The Moonglows	"Secret Love"	"Real Gone Mama"
1153	Conti Condoli (sic)	"Flamingo"	"Mambo Junior"
1154	The Flamingos	"Cross over the Bridge"	"Listen to My Plea"
1155	J. B. and His Hawks	"Combination Boogie"	"Now She's Gone"
1156	The Moonglows	"Ooh Rocking Daddy"	"I Was Wrong"
1157	The Five Chances	"I May Be Small"	"Nagasaki"
1158	Bobby Prince	"If You Only Knew"	"Think It Over"
1159	Freddie Hall	"This Crooked World"	"Knock Me Out"
1160	J. B. and His Hawks	"Pet Cream Man"	"Lovin You"
1161	The Moonglows	"219 Train"	"My Gal"
1162	The Flamingos	"Blues in a Letter"	"Jump Children"
1163	Willie Nix	"Nervous Wreck"	"No More Love"
1165	J. B. Hutto and His Hawks	"Dim Lights"	"Things Are So Slow"
3006	Al Trace and His Orchestra	"Please Mr. Right Man"	"Tantalazing Melody"

== See also ==
- List of record labels
