= Dusty Brown (musician) =

American blues harmonica player, singer and songwriter (1929–2016)

- Born: Clement W. Triplett; March 11, 1929; Tralake, Mississippi, United States
- Died: July 10, 2016 (aged 87)
- Genres: Electric blues
- Occupations: Harmonicist, singer, songwriter
- Instrument(s): Harmonica, vocals
- Years active: Early 1950s–2016
- Labels: Various

Clement W. Triplett (March 11, 1929 – July 10, 2016) who was known professionally as Dusty Brown, was an American electric blues harmonica player, singer and songwriter. Over a long career, he variously worked with Muddy Waters, Little Walter, Sunnyland Slim, Hip Linkchain, Eddie Cusic, Little Son Joe, Howlin' Wolf, Bobby Rush, Henry Gray, Luther "Snake Boy" Johnson, Lonnie Johnson, Sonny Thompson and Buddy Guy.

== Biography ==
He was born on March 11, 1929, in Tralake, Mississippi, United States. Left in the care of his brothers on a farm in the Deep South, Brown taught himself to play the harmonica by borrowing his elder siblings instruments. The sharecropping existence was not for him, and Brown spent a part of his teenage years acting as part-time chauffeur for Eddie Cusic. In 1946, he left the Delta to join his mother in Chicago, Illinois, where he found employment as a taxicab driver and, in his spare time, variously saw Cab Calloway, Sonny Boy Williamson I and Tampa Red play. He was also introduced to Williamson and Little Walter, and became more enthused about trying to earn a living as a musician. Little Son Joe led a small band, which Brown took over the running of, and involved Tyrone Davis as guitarist and vocalist. By 1953, the ensemble, now including Lester Davenport playing the drums, acquired a residency at the Kasbah Lounge previously held by Freddie King. Brown started to share stages with musicians such as Muddy Waters and Little Walter.

The band evolved, changing its residency and band members by including Hip Linkchain among others. Through playing, Brown met up with other musicians such as Howlin' Wolf, Bobby Rush and Buddy Guy. Brown also played alongside Eddie Taylor for a while during this time. By the mid-1950s, Brown was keen to make a recording and sent a tape to Vee-Jay and Chess, before Al Benson decided to take a chance on Brown, primarily as Brown's playing did not sound similar to Little Walter. On October 1, 1955, Benson recorded Brown on harmonica, alongside Little Son Joe (vocals and guitar), Johnny Sturdivant (drums) and Henry Gray (piano). Two of the tracks recorded were "He Don't Love You" and "Yes She's Gone", and these were issued on the Chicago-based Parrot Records label in November that year. A further two tracks, "Rusty Dusty" and "Hurry Home", were not released at the time, but have appeared on later compilation albums. Further recording opportunities there were scuppered, when the label folded the following year. In 1958, the similarly small outfit, Bandera Records, allowed Brown to cut four sides; "Will You Forgive Me Baby", "Well, You Know", "Please Don't Go" and "Do You Love Me". The individuals on that recording were Brown, plus Hip Linkchain and his brother Jug, augmented by Bob Richey as drummer and Gray again on the piano. Only the middle two of the previously named tracks were released in 1959. Again the unreleased tracks were made available on more recent compilations. All of the recorded songs were written and arranged by Brown. He continued with his day job but performed regularly on the basis of the recordings, working mainly around Chicago's West Side. Club appearances tailed off as the decade progressed, and Brown did not play very often during the 1960s.

In 1972, Brown played harmonica on Luther "Snake Boy" Johnson's album, Born in Georgia. The same year, the opportunity came for Brown to perform overseas and he toured Europe with a band composed of Brown, Lonnie Johnson, Sonny Thompson and Bill Warren. On Brown's return his extended absence meant that he was out of work. He moved on to toil in a tractor factory in Joliet, Illinois, employed there up to his retirement in 1991. Meanwhile, in 1975, Brown had opened a club, Dusty's Lounge, in Chicago Heights, Illinois, where he played host to fellow Chicago blues veterans until the club was destroyed in a fire in 1984.

Brown recorded again in 1990, but was dissatisfied with the resultant quality of the end product. A short while later, he relocated to Montgomery, Alabama, to live a peaceful existence, and rarely played for a period of 15 years. He moved back to Chicago and was contacted about starting playing again. In 2005, Brown and a handful of other blues harp musicians including Little Addison, Oscar Coleman, Larry Cox, Russ Green, and Harmonica Khan, recorded an album entitled, Diamonds in the Rough, for Severn Records billed as the Chicago Blues Harmonica Project. Brown contributed two new recordings; "I Got To Go" and a reworking of his 1955 composition, "He Don't Love You".

Brown died on July 10, 2016, at the age of 87.

== Partial discography ==
=== Singles ===
Year	Title (A-side / B-side)	Record label			
Year	Title (A-side / B-side)	Record label	1955	"Yes She's Gone" / "He Don't Love You"	Parrot Records
1958	"Please Don't Go" / "Well, You Know"	Bandera Records			

=== Albums ===
Year	Title	Record label	Credited to
1972	Born in Georgia	Black & Blue	Luther "Snake Boy" Johnson
2005	Diamonds in the Rough	Severn	Chicago Blues Harmonica Project

== See also ==
- List of electric blues musicians
