= Parrot Records (blues label) =

- Founded: 1952
- Founder: Al Benson
- Status: Inactive since 1956
- Genre: Blues; Jazz; Doo-wop; Gospel
- Country of origin: United States
- Location: Chicago, Illinois

Parrot Records was an American Chicago-based record label, founded in 1952 by the disc jockey, Al Benson. It specialized in blues, jazz, doo-wop, and gospel. The company began operating in mid-1953, and lasted until mid-1956. Several Parrot recordings were later released by Chess Records. Parrot's sister label Blue Lake operated from 1954 to 1956. There were plans for another subsidiary, to be called Eagle, but these were scrapped.

== Releases on 78 and 45 rpm singles ==
- Parrot 1050 Willie Mabon and his Combo - "I Don't Know" b/w "Worry Blues"
- Parrot 772 The Parrots - "Weep, Weep, Weep" b/w "Please Don't Leave Me"
- Parrot 775 Herbie Fields and Orchestra - "Harlem Nocturne" b/w "Things Ain't What They Used to Be"
- Parrot 780 Mable (sic) Scott - "Mr. Fine" b/w "Mable Blues"
- Parrot 781 Chocolateers - "Peckin'" b/w "Bartender Blues"
- Parrot 782 Curtis Jones- "Wrong Blues" b/w "Cool Playing Blues"
- Parrot 783 Coleman Hawkins and Orchestra - "I'll See You Later" b/w "What a Difference a Day Made"
- Parrot 784 Coleman Hawkins and Orchestra - "I'll Follow My Secret Heart" b/w "Blue Blue Days"
- Parrot 785 Playboy Thomas - "Too Much Pride" b/w "No Doubt about It"
- Parrot 786 Marvin Phillips - "Salty Dog" b/w "Sweetheart, Darling"
- Parrot 787 Lowell Fulson and Orchestra - "I've Been Mistreated" b/w "Juke Box Shuffle"
- Parrot 788 Jo Jo Adams - "Call My Baby" b/w "Rebecca"
- Parrot 789 The Rockettes - "Love Nobody" b/w "I Can't Forget"
- Parrot 790 Lonnie Simmons Quartet - "Black Orchid" b/w "I Can't Get Started"
- Parrot 791 Ernest Lewis - "No More Lovin'" b/w "West Coast Blues"
- Parrot 792 Paul Bascomb and his Orchestra - "Jan (Part I)" b/w "Jan (Part II)"
- Parrot 793 The Pelicans - "Aurelia" b/w "White Cliffs of Dover"
- Parrot 794 Mable (sic) Scott - "Do the Thing" b/w "Fool Burro"
- Parrot 795 Marvin Phillips - "Ann Marie" b/w "Honey Baby"
- Parrot 796 Five Thrills - "Feel So Good" b/w "My Baby's Gone"
- Parrot 797 Jimmy Rushing with Frank Culley Combo - "Mr. 5 x 5" b/w "Clothes Pin Blues"
- Parrot 798 Albert King - "Be on Your Merry Way" b/w "Bad Luck Blues"
- Parrot 799 John Brim and his Stompers - "Tough Times" b/w "Gary Stomp"
- Parrot 800 Five Thrills - "Gloria" b/w "Wee Wee Baby"
- Parrot 802 J. B. Lenoir - "Eisenhower Blues" b/w "I'm in Korea"
- Parrot 802 J. B. Lenoir - "Tax Paying Blues" b/w "I'm in Korea"
- Parrot 806 Herbie Fields and Orchestra - "I Love You" b/w "Mr. Jump"
- Parrot 807 Snooky Pryor - "Crosstown Blues" b/w "I Want You for Myself"
- Parrot 808 The Flamingos - "On My Merry Way" b/w "Dream of a Lifetime"
- Parrot 809 J. B. Lenore (sic) - "Mamma Talk to Your Daughter" b/w "Man Watch Your Woman"
- Parrot 810 Ahmad Jamal - "But Not for Me" b/w "Seleritus"
- Parrot 811 The Flamingos - "Get with It" b/w "I Really Don't Want to Know"
- Parrot 812 The Flamingos - "Ko-Ko-Mo" b/w "I'm Yours"
- Parrot 813 Little Willy Foster - "Falling Rain Blues" b/w "Four Day Jump" (also released as Blue Lake 113)
- Parrot 814 J. B. Lenore - "Mama Your Daughter Is Going to Miss Me" b/w "What Have I Done"
- Parrot 815 The Orchids - "Newly Wed" b/w "You're Everything to Me"
- Parrot 816 Paul Bascomb and his Orchestra / The Five Arrows - "You've Got Me Losing My Mind" b/w "Pretty Little Thing"
- Parrot 817 Paul Bascomb and his Orchestra - "Alley B on Fifth Avenue" b/w "Jumping at the El Cino"
- Parrot 818 Ahmad Jamal - "It Could Happen to You" b/w "Excerpts from the Blues"
- Parrot 819 The Orchids - "You Said You Loved Me" b/w "I Can't Refuse"
- Parrot 820 Dusty Brown - "Yes She's Gone" b/w "He Don't Love You"
- Parrot 821 J. B. Lenore - "Fine Girls" b/w "I Lost My Baby'
- Parrot 822 Benson-Ogletree - "Tell It like It Is" b/w "Uptown Stomp"
- Parrot 823 St. Louis Jimmy - "Going Down Slow" b/w "Murder in the First Degree"
- Parrot 105 The Willie Webb Singers - "Climbing High Mountains" b/w "God Is Good to Me"
- Parrot 106 The Willie Webb Singers - "He Will Be There" b/w "He's a Wonder"
- Parrot 107 The Victorettes - "Jesus Has Promised" b/w "When Night Comes"
- Parrot 109 The Peace Makers - "When I Go" b/w "I Know What I Believe'
- Parrot 1000 Bessie Griffen (sic) - "Story of Job" b/w "What Jesus Means to Me"
- Parrot 1001 Veteran Singers - "Give It Up" b/w "The Old Account Was Settled" (also released on Blue Lake 1001)
- Parrot 6000 The Leon Abbey Trio, Al Benson - "If You Were the Only Girl" b/w "Abbey's Boogie"

== Releases on 12-inch album ==
- Ahmad Jamal: Ahmad Jamal Plays
- Johnny Griffin: Unissued
- Paul Bascomb: Unissued

== See also ==
- List of record labels
