= Lazy Bill Lucas =

American blues singer and pianist (1918–1982)

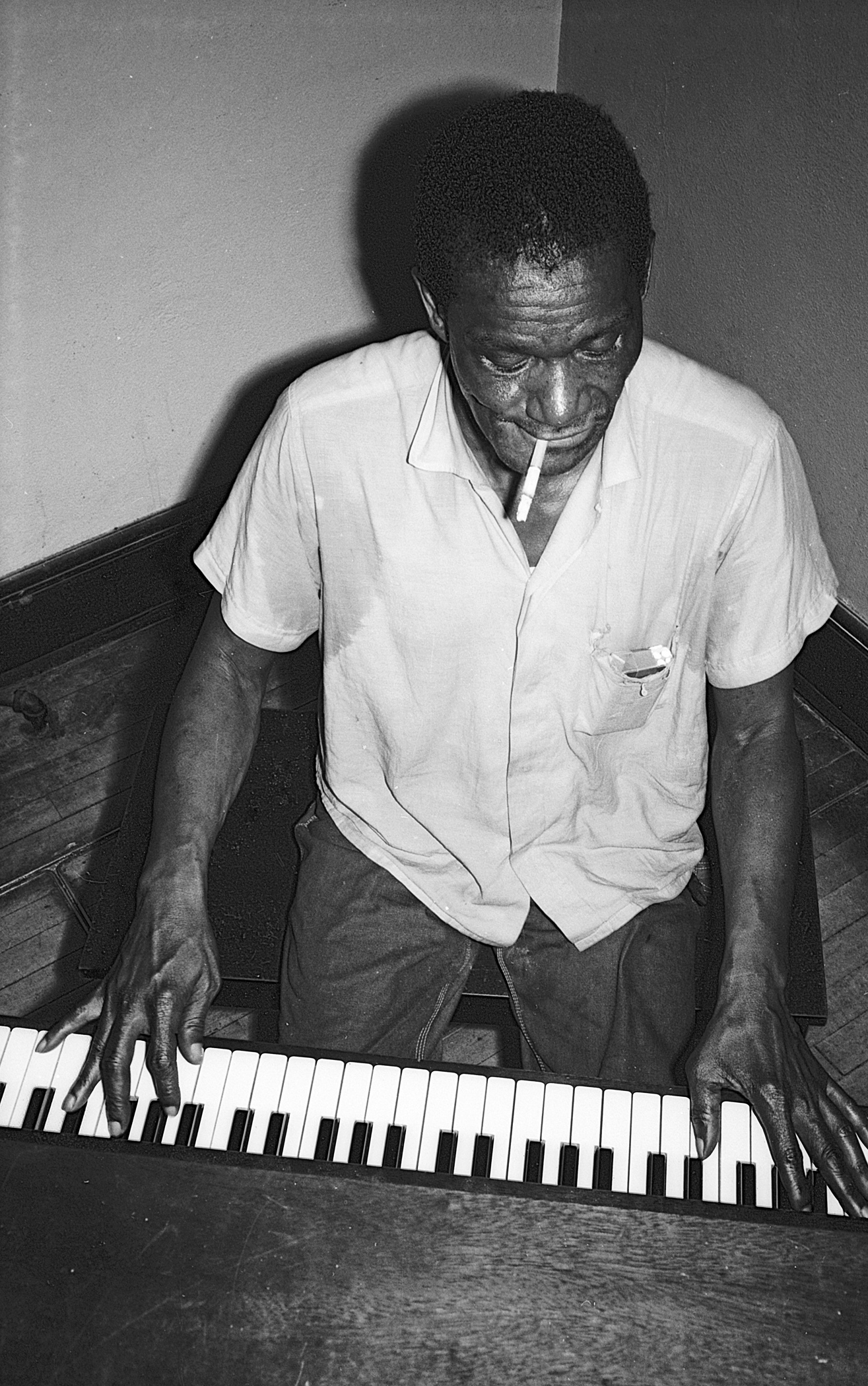
- Lazy Bill Lucas, Minneapolis, 1969.

Background information
- Born: William Lucas; May 29, 1918; Wynne, Arkansas, U.S.
- Died: December 11, 1982 (aged 64) Minneapolis, Minnesota, U.S.
- Genres: Chicago blues
- Occupations: Singer, musician
- Instruments: Singer, piano, guitar
- Years active: 1940s–1982

Lazy Bill Lucas (May 29, 1918 – December 11, 1982) was an American blues musician who was part of the birth of the Chicago blues scene in the 1940s, 1950s and early 1960s. He then took his talents to Minneapolis, Minnesota, becoming an important part of that city's blues history until his death.

== Early career ==
Born William Lucas to sharecroppers in Wynne, Arkansas, United States, Lucas's family was always looking for better living conditions and worked their way north to Southern Missouri, then to St. Louis in 1940 and Chicago the year after. As a youngster, he sang on the streets of Advance, Missouri, where the mostly white audience preferred hillbilly songs, but in St. Louis in 1940, he teamed up with blues singer Big Joe Williams and started singing for a black audience. Until 1946, Lucas played guitar on the streets, often at the side of Sonny Boy Williamson II. Later that year, he formed a trio with Willie Mabon and Earl Dranes, joined the Musicians Union, and enjoyed a two-week gig at the Tuxedo Lounge. For several years, he played in various blues combos and played in various clubs, bars and street settings. During this time, he played with Johnny "Man" Young, Jo Jo Williams, Homesick James, Little Hudson, Snooky Pryor, and Little Walter. In 1950, Lucas switched from guitar to piano and worked as a sideman for various blues bands, and appeared on records by Little Willy Foster, Homesick James and Snooky Pryor.

In 1954, while leading the trio Lazy Bill and His Blue Rhythms, he secured a recording contract with Chance Records, who gave him one recording session. The company released one 78 rpm phonograph record – "She Got Me Walkin'" b/w "I Had a Dream". In 1955 he headed an ensemble billed as Blues Rockers, who issued a single via Excello Records. The recording took place in Nashville, Tennessee, with Lucas on vocals and piano, P.T. Hayes playing the harmonica, Earl Dranes on guitar and Jo Jo Williams supplying guitar, bass and drums.

== Later career ==
As the 1950s progressed, work became harder to find, and during the 1960s, Lucas tried to get into the folk-blues scene but could not secure any contracts. From 1964 and well into the 1970s, Lucas straddled two careers: playing in various groups led by George "Mojo" Buford and playing solo or leading his own small groups. In 1970 he played in a revue, Dat Feelin', scripted by Black activist Milton Williams, at Minneapolis' Guthrie Theatre, to show the range and history of Afro-American music. The same year Lucas appeared at the Wisconsin Delta Blues Festival, and the Ann Arbor Blues Festival. In France, record producer Michel Engelhard released two LPs, Lazy Bill Lucas (1969, vocals and solo piano) and Lazy Bill and His Friends (1970), in which he was featured with musicians George "Mojo" Buford (harmonica) and Jo Jo Williams (guitar). In 1973, he released an album of vocals and solo piano on Philo Records. In 1979, Lucas, who had played live on the radio in the 1960s, started hosting his own regular radio show, The Lazy Bill Lucas Show on KFAI in Minneapolis.

Lucas died of natural causes in Minneapolis in December 1982, at the age of 64.

== Discography ==
=== Singles ===
- Lazy Bill and His Blue Rhythms: "She Got Me Walkin" b/w " I Had A Dream" : Chance Records 1148 (1954)
- Blues Rockers: "Calling All Cows" b/w " Johnny Mae" : Excello Records 2062 (1955)

=== Albums ===
- Lazy Bill Lucas: Wild Records 12MO1 (1969)
- Lazy Bill and His Friends: Lazy Records 12MO2 (1970)
- Lazy Bill Lucas: Philo Records 1007 (1974)
- Have Mercy: Cold Wind Records (1988)
