= Sabre Records =

- Founded: 1953
- Founder: Art Sheridan
- Defunct: 1954
- Status: Defunct
- Genre: Blues, jazz, doo-wop
- Country of origin: U.S.
- Location: Chicago, Illinois

Sabre Records was an American, Chicago-based independent record label, founded in 1953 by Art Sheridan. It specialized in blues, jazz, and doo-wop.

Sabre closed down at the end of 1954, when its former owner became one of the financial backers of Vee-Jay, which was growing into a powerhouse of the independent record business.

== History ==
Sabre was a subsidiary of Chance Records, a successful independent record label that Art Sheridan, who previously operated a record distributor and a pressing plant, opened in September 1950.

By 1953, Chance had built a roster of artists and was recording prolifically Sheridan was running both Chance Records and American Record Distributors out of an office at 1151 East 47th Street. By June of that year, he needed a new outlet to accommodate his expanding catalog, so he opened Sabre at 1225 East 47th Street.

The first Sabre release appeared in July 1953. It featured veteran blues performer Tampa Red, whose 19-year affiliation with RCA Victor was coming to an end, appearing under the pseudonym "Jimmy Eager." Backing was provided by what had become Sheridan's house band, directed by bassist Al Smith and featuring tenor saxophonist Red Holloway, guitarist Lefty Bates, and drummer Vernel Fournier. Sabre also released a classic single by another member of Sheridan's blues roster, Willie Nix.

Although the more famous vocal groups, The Moonglows and The Flamingos, released their records on Chance, Sabre featured two doo-wop releases by the Five Blue Notes and three by the Five Echoes; one of the Echoes' singles included guest lead vocalist Walter Spriggs, going under the unconvincing stage name "Wally Wilson." Backing for these sessions was provided by the bands of Ike "Fats" Cole and Al Smith.

Finally, Sabre recorded the jazz groups of Ben Bryant and Johnny Miller.

In June 1954, Al Smith and his corps of studio musicians moved to Vee-Jay. Sabre made its last release in August 1954. Sheridan wound down his labels in December 1954, becoming an unpublicized investor in the newer company.

== Series ==
Sabre was responsible for a total of nine releases (100 through 109, skipping 107).

== Releases ==
Catalog #	Artist	A-side	B-side
100	Jimmy Eager	"I Should Have Loved Her More"	"Please Mr. Doctor”
101	Ben Bryant	"Cats Delight"	"Blue Midnight"
102	The Five Echoes	"Baby, Come Back to Me"	"Lonely Mood”
103	The Five Blue Notes	"Ooh Baby"	"My Gal Is Gone
104	Willie Nix	"Just Can't Stay"	"All by Myself”
105	The Five Echoes	"So Lonesome"	"Broke”
106	Wally Wilson	"If You Don't Love Me"	"The Hunt”
108	The Five Blue Notes	"You Gotta Go Baby"	"The Beat of Our Hearts”
109	Johnny Miller	"I Cover the Waterfront"	"Always”

== See also ==
- List of record labels
