= Herbie Fields =

American jazz musician (1919–1958)

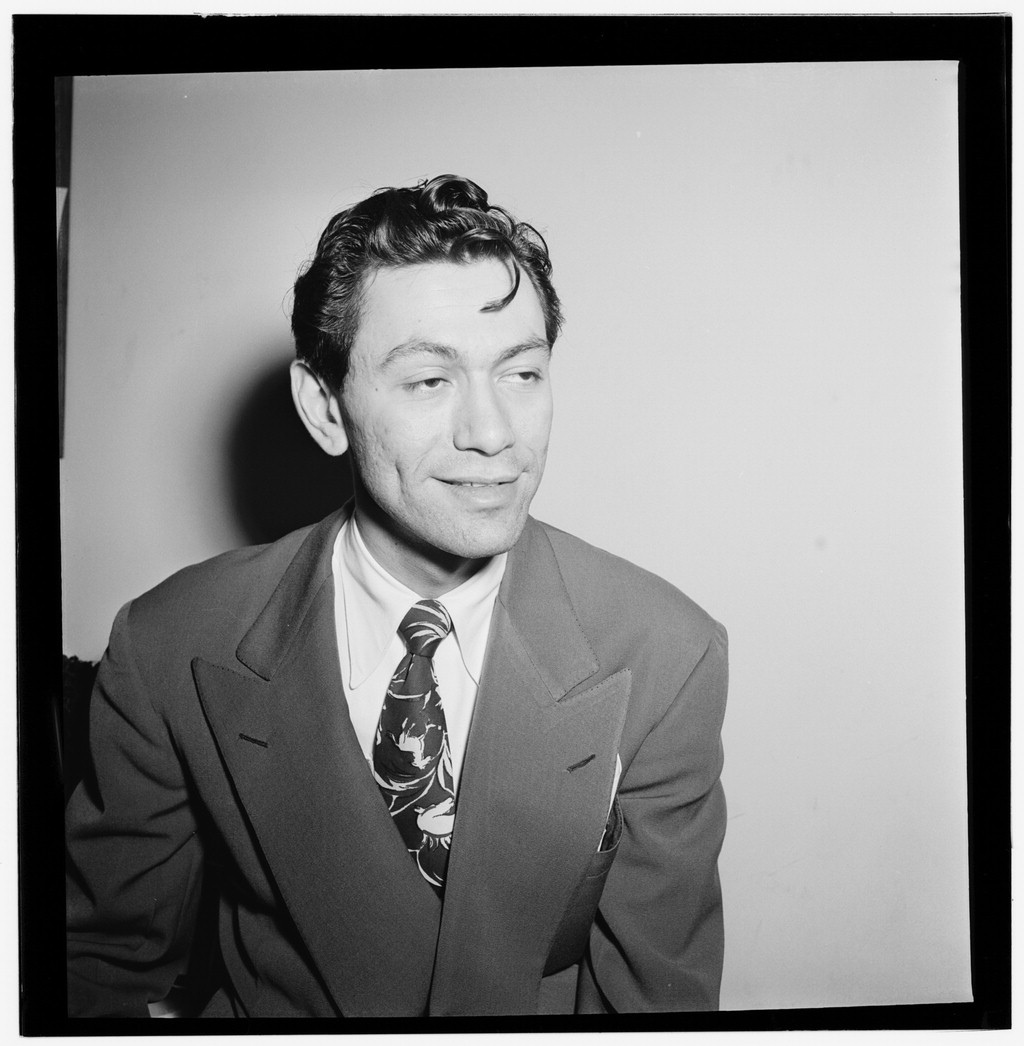
- c. June 1946

Background information
- Born: May 24, 1919
- Origin: Asbury Park, New Jersey, U.S.
- Died: September 17, 1958 (aged 39)
- Genres: Big Band, Jazz, R&B
- Occupations: Musician, Band leader
- Instruments: Alto saxophone, Clarinet
- Years active: 1940s–1958
- Labels: Fraternity, Parrot, RCA Victor, Savoy, Signature

Herbie Fields (Herbert Bernfeld, May 24, 1919 – September 17, 1958) was an American jazz musician. He attended New York's famed Juilliard School of Music (1936–38) and served in the U.S. Army from 1941 to 1943.

== Career ==
Membership in the Raymond Scott Quintette and other commercial work while based in New York preceded his Army service stateside. By mid-1941, at Fort Dix, New Jersey, he—officially Sgt. Herbert Bernfeld—was leader of a 14-piece swing band. Fields's group received some publicity as the first Army unit of its type, though another also performing in mid-1941 was the 369th's ensemble of African-American musicians, based in Fort Ontario. Fields's Fort Dix bandmembers were all veterans of swing bands and Broadway, and the group—officially the "Fort Dix Reception Center Band"—toured military installations on the eastern seaboard and were featured on the WOR/Mutual radio program This is Fort Dix.

Following Fields's military service he made several attempts to mount his own civilian big band. In April 1944 Billboard magazine reported his most recent venture, managed by the William Morris Agency, with arrangements by George Handy. According to Billboard, "Fields's last fronting attempt flopped two months ago because, it is alleged, of poor bookings." By the end of 1944, had joined Lionel Hampton's outfit.

Fields began recording in 1944 with two sides for Bob Thiele's Signature label. Over the next year and a half he recorded for Savoy; notably, he shared a date with Rubberlegs Williams that featured teenaged Miles Davis' recording debut. Fields replaced Earl Bostic, as alto saxophonist in Lionel Hampton's band. Fields was fluent in a variety of reed instruments, from clarinet to baritone saxophone. In 1945, he won Esquire magazine's New Star Award on the Alto Sax. In 1946, RCA Victor signed Fields as leader of his own big band, a format that was becoming increasingly difficult to maintain in the Post-War period.

Neal Hefti was one of his sidemen along with Bill Evans, Eddie Bert, Bernie Glow, Manny Albam, Al Klink (formally with Glenn Miller), Marty Napoleon, and Serge Chaloff. "Dardanella" was his biggest hit. The band was a commercial failure—as were many big bands of the day.

In 1949–1950, he formed his Septet featuring Frank Rosolino on trombone, Jimmy Nottingham on trumpet, Jim Aton on bass, Bill Evans on piano and Tiny Kahn on drums. The band was based in Chicago and backed numerous stage shows, and frequently had Lurlean Hunter on vocals. In the summer of 1950 Fields's group accompanied Billie Holiday on a successful three-month tour of East Coast venues, including the Apollo Theater in Harlem and the Howard Theater in Washington.

Fields gravitated toward an R&B conception in the fifties, and was disgruntled about his lack of success. Vibist Terry Gibbs noted:

"We played opposite a nine-piece band led by Herbie Fields at Birdland. He was a good tenor player but not in the bebop style. He was more of a "honker" and played what they called rhythm and blues. He did that very well but he wasn't a Birdland-style attraction."

And pianist Bill Evans recalled:

"In some ways he had been a forerunner of rock 'n' roll. He was wiggling, jerking. Rock 'n' roll came, brought millions of dollars, but nothing for Herbie Fields."

His recording activity in the fifties was sporadic, and ranged from a few more big band sides, honking jukebox tunes (for Parrot), bop-tinged small groups, and finally a reeds and strings session released after his death by Fraternity. He lived in Miami, and had owned a restaurant there, the Rancher, in North Miami. He had a trio, himself, Skeets McLane and Cookie Norwood that played at the Rancher. Fields ended his life with an overdose of sleeping pills in Miami on September 17, 1958. His suicide note, according to police, included the statement "I have completed my mission in life."
