= Sonny Parker (musician) =

American blues and jazz singer, dancer, and drummer (1925–1957)

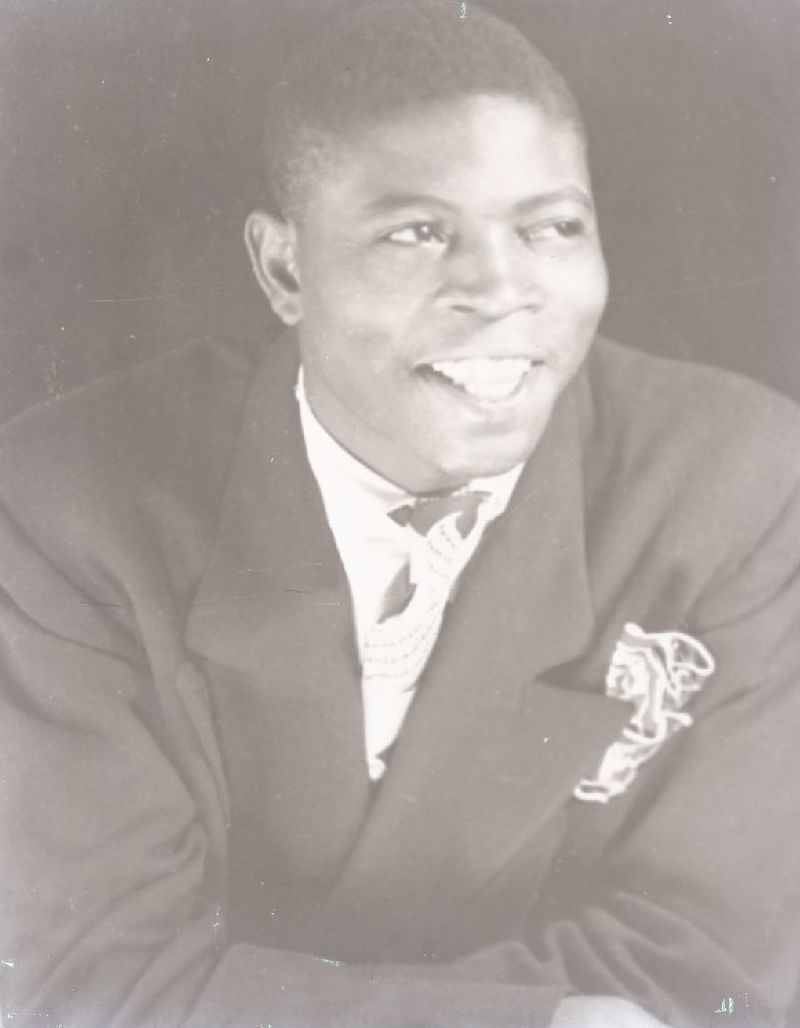
Sonny Parker publicity photo at Duke-Peacock Records

Willis "Sonny" Parker (May 5, 1925 or October 29, 1926 – February 7, 1957) was an American blues and jazz singer, dancer, and drummer.

== Biography ==
Parker was born in Youngstown, Ohio, in 1925 or 1926 (sources differ), and was raised in Chicago by the popular vaudeville duo, Butterbeans and Susie (Jodie and Susie Edwards). He led a band at the Cotton Club in Cincinnati in 1948 which included King Kolax as one of his sidemen, and recorded with Kolax in Los Angeles later that year. He then replaced Rubell Blakely as vocalist in Lionel Hampton's ensemble. His time with Hampton included appearances in the films Lionel Hampton and His Orchestra (1949) and Jelly Roll (1952), and on Hampton's recordings from this time on Decca – including the 1949 R&B chart hit "Drinkin' Wine Spo-Dee-O-Dee" – and MGM.

He also recorded under his own name, for various labels including Aladdin, Spire, Peacock and Brunswick, often using various members of Hampton's orchestra. He toured Europe with Hampton several times between 1953 and 1955. In March 1955, during a concert at Valenciennes, France, Parker had a brain hemorrhage, from which he did not recover. He returned to the United States and died in hospital in New York City in 1957.
