= Hard Drivin' Blues =

Studio album by Roosevelt Sykes with Homesick James Williamson
- Released: 1964
- Recorded: January 27, 1962 and May 17, 1963
- Studio: United Recording Studios, Chicago
- Genre: Blues
- Length: 45:39
- Label: Delmark; DL-607
- Producer: Robert G. Koester

Roosevelt Sykes chronology
The Honeydripper: Roosevelt Sykes Plays and Sings the Blues (1962)	Hard Drivin' Blues (1964)	Roosevelt Sykes in Europe (1969)

Hard Drivin' Blues is an album by blues musician Roosevelt Sykes with Homesick James Williamson recorded in 1963 and released by the Delmark label the following year.

== Reception ==
Professional ratings
Review scores
Source	Rating
AllMusic	4.5/5 stars

AllMusic reviewer arwulf arwulf stated: "When the music heard on this album was recorded in January 1962 and May 1963, Sykes was in the process of ripening into a sanguine creature even more interesting and provocative than his earlier selves had been. ... Sykes had enjoyed one hell of a comeback as an internationally acclaimed master of the blues; he toured extensively, playing tiny saloons and massive music festivals, even recording at times with electrically amplified instrumental backing. All throughout the second half of the 1970s, the one-man, one-piano Hard Drivin' Blues album was warmly received by those lucky enough to have caught Sykes live and in person, and it still stands as one of the very finest recordings in his entire discography ...There are plenty of Roosevelt Sykes albums to choose from; this one is essential, fundamental, and indispensable.".

== Track listing ==
All compositions by Roosevelt Sykes

1. "Kickin' Motor Scooter" – 2:51 Additional track on CD reissue
2. "Red-Eye Jesse Bell" – 2:44
3. "I Like What You Do" – 1:46
4. "New Fire Detective Blues" – 2:51
5. "North Gulfport Boogie" – 3:03
6. "Watch Your Step" – 2:22
7. "Ho! Ho! Ho!" – 3:00
8. "Key to Your Heart" – 2:26 Additional track on CD reissue
9. "We Gotta Move" – 2:58
10. "Dresser Drawers" – 2:44 Additional track on CD reissue
11. "Living the Right Life" – 2:43
12. "Run This Boogie" – 2:29
13. "Slidell Blues" – 3:27
14. "Mistake In Life" – 2:33 Additional track on CD reissue
15. "You So Small" – 2:29 Additional track on CD reissue
16. "Concentration Blues" – 2:56
17. "She's Got Me Straddle a Log" – 2:17

== Personnel ==
- Roosevelt Sykes – piano, vocals
- Homesick James Williamson – guitar, bass (tracks 6, 9, 10, 12, 13 & 16)
