= Danny Overbea =

American R&B singer, guitarist and songwriter (1926–1994)

- Born: Daniel Dorsey Overbea; January 3, 1926; Philadelphia, Pennsylvania, United States
- Died: May 11, 1994 (aged 68) Chicago, Illinois, U.S.
- Genres: Rhythm and blues, pop
- Occupations: Singer, guitarist, songwriter
- Instruments: Guitar, vocals
- Years active: 1946–1970s
- Labels: Checker, Argo, Federal

Daniel Dorsey "Danny" Overbea (January 3, 1926 – May 11, 1994) was an American rhythm and blues singer, guitarist and songwriter, best known for his songs "Train, Train, Train" and "Forty Cups of Coffee", which he wrote and recorded in the early 1950s.

== Life and career ==
He was born in Philadelphia, but grew up on the South Side of Chicago where he learned guitar while at DuSable High School. After serving with the military, he started a professional career as a musician in 1946, initially with the Three Earls in Cleveland, Ohio, before launching a solo career. After returning to Chicago he made his first recording in 1950, as guest vocalist on saxophonist Eddie Chamblee's "Every Shut Eye Ain't Sleep". He signed as a solo artist to Premium Records, and released his first single, "Contrary Mary", in early 1951. He became a popular club performer, noted for his guitar skills while performing splits, playing behind his back, and with his teeth, many such moves emulating T-Bone Walker (and later adopted by Jimi Hendrix).

In 1952, he was spotted by radio DJ Al Benson, who arranged for him to be signed by Chess Records. His first and most successful record for the company, "Train, Train, Train", his own composition, was issued on the Checker subsidiary label in early 1953 and reached number 7 on the Billboard R&B chart. The song was covered by Buddy Morrow, whose version on RCA Victor reached number 28 on the pop chart.

Overbea became a favorite of leading DJ Alan Freed and appeared on some of Freed's shows as well as maintaining a performing schedule in Chicago clubs. On his second Checker single, "Forty Cups of Coffee", he was backed by the King Kolax Orchestra. A cover version by Ella Mae Morse reached number 26 on the pop chart, and the song was recorded by Bill Haley in 1956. According to AllMusic, Overbea's first two Checker records were "essentially rock ‘n’ roll songs before the concept of ‘rock ‘n’ roll’ had even emerged."

His later records for Checker were less successful, and he interspersed his rockier recordings with ballads in the style of Billy Eckstine, such as "Sorrento", which he sang in Italian, "You're Mine" (also recorded by The Flamingos), and "A Toast to Lovers". He continued to tour, with Dinah Washington and others, and performed on Alan Freed's shows including the week-long Easter Jubilee of Stars in Brooklyn in April 1955. After several singles on Checker, Overbea moved in 1956 to the Argo label, another Chess subsidiary specifically established to market pop music. However, his Argo recordings were not commercially successful, and he left in 1957. He then recorded for Federal Records in Cincinnati, until 1959, but again with little success. His last known recordings were for the Apex label in Chicago.

Overbea continued to perform occasionally in Chicago clubs until the 1970s. He died in Chicago in 1994, aged 68.
