= Blue Lake Records =

- Founded: 1954
- Founder: Al Benson
- Defunct: 1956
- Status: inactive
- Genre: Blues, jazz, doo-wop, gospel
- Country of origin: United States
- Location: Chicago, Illinois

Blue Lake was a Chicago-based record label founded in 1954 by disc jockey Al Benson. It specialized in blues, doo-wop, jazz, and gospel. A subsidiary of Benson's Parrot operation, it lasted until mid-1956. Many of the Blue Lake recordings were acquired by Chess Records.

== Releases ==
- Blue Lake 101 Red Saunders and his Orchestra - "Summertime" b/w "Riverboat"
- Blue Lake 102 Joe Williams - "In the Evening" b/w "Tired of Moving"
- Blue Lake 103 Ann Carter - "You Oughta Quit It" b/w "Lovin' Daddy Blues"
- Blue Lake 104 King Fleming's Quintette - "One O'Clock Jump" b/w "William's Blues" (featured vocalist: Lorez Alexandria)
- Blue Lake 105 Sunnyland Slim - "Going Back to Memphis" b/w "Devil Is a Busy Man"
- Blue Lake 106 Baby Boy Warren - "Mattie Mae" b/w "Santa Fe"
- Blue Lake 107 Sunnyland Slim - "Shake It Baby" b/w "Bassology"
- Blue Lake 108 Lou Mac - "Come Back Little Daddy" b/w "Hard to Get Along With" (real name: Lou McClinton)
- Blue Lake 109 Walter Spriggs - "I'm Not Your Fool Anymore" b/w "Week End Man"
- Blue Lake 111 The Maples / Von Freeman Combo - "99 Guys" b/w "I Must Forget You"
- Blue Lake 112 The Fascinators - "Can't Stop" b/w "Don't Give My Love Away"
- Blue Lake 113 Little Willy Foster - "Falling Rain Blues" b/w "Four Day Jump" (also released on Parrot 813)
- Blue Lake 114 Lou Mac - "Slow Down" b/w "Baby"
- Blue Lake 115 The Five Chances - "Shake-a-Link" b/w "All I Want"
- Blue Lake 116 Little Papa Joe - "Looking for My Baby" b/w "Easy Lovin'"
- Blue Lake 117 Lou Mac - "I'll Never Let Him Know" b/w "Albert Is His Name"
- Blue Lake 118 Leon Tarver - "Somebody Help Me" b/w "Oh Baby I'm Blue"
- Blue Lake 119 Lou Mac - "Move Me" b/w "Take Your Trouble to a Friend"
- Blue Lake 1001 Veteran Singers - "Give It Up" b/w "The Old Account Was Settled" (also released on Parrot 1001)

== See also ==
- List of record labels
