= King Kolax =

American jazz trumpeter and bandleader (1912–1991)

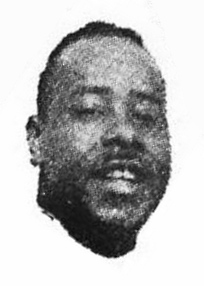
- King Kolax c. 1943

Background information
- Born: William Little; November 6, 1912; Kansas City, Missouri, U.S.
- Died: December 18, 1991 (aged 79) Chicago, Illinois, U.S.
- Genres: Jazz; blues
- Occupations: Musician; bandleader
- Instruments: Trumpet; vocals
- Years active: 1930–1981
- Labels: Opera; J.O.B.; Checker; Chance; Vee-Jay; Marvello
- Formerly of: Billy Eckstine band; Sonny Parker band; J. T. Brown band

King Kolax (born William Little; November 6, 1912 – December 18, 1991) was an American jazz trumpeter and bandleader.

== Biography ==
William Little was born in Kansas City, Missouri, in 1912; he misleadingly claimed he was born in 1918 in later years. While young, his family moved to Chicago, where he studied music under Walter Dyett. He completed a degree at the Chicago Conservatory of Music in the early 1930s and played in dance bands in Chicago during the decade. Around 1938, he became bandleader of one of those groups; this ensemble toured the U.S. and continued playing regularly at venues such as the Savoy Theater and the 65 Club. In 1939, Charlie Parker played in his band.

Kolax formed another band in 1943 and again toured the American south. He continued touring throughout the country and on military bases within the U.S. through 1946. In May 1946, his group broke up and Kolax joined Billy Eckstine's big band with which he made his first recordings. Eckstine's band dissolved before the end of the year, so Kolax organized another band late in 1946 which lasted until May 1947; John Coltrane was a member of this ensemble. After the demise of his band, Kolax returned to Chicago to play in small groups.

In 1948, he played in Sonny Parker's band and recorded for the Opera label as a leader and singer. He had a steady job at the Ritz Lounge in 1949 and played in J. T. Brown's band in 1951. Establishing a new band of his own, he recorded for J.O.B. Records in a session that featured his blues singing. In 1952, he backed Joe Williams on his singles for the Checker label. While playing at the Paris Club in 1953, Kolax recorded with Danny Overbea, also for Checker. That same year, Kolax and orchestra backed The Flamingos on Chance. He also led orchestras behind Mabel Scott and Rudy Greene. He recorded again for Vee-Jay at the end of 1954 and in September 1955.

Kolax made regular engagements at hotels and ballrooms throughout the 1950s in Chicago and elsewhere; he had a working relationship with Sun Ra, who wrote arrangements for him. In the second half of the decade, Kolax recorded with Earl Pugh, Brooks & Brown, Clyde Williams, and Harvey Ellington; in the early 1960s, records followed with Wilbur White, The Chanteurs, Jerry Butler, McKinley Mitchell, Otis Rush, and The Vondells. Kolax became an A&R representative for Marvello Records, owned by the Chicago businessman James P. Johnson, between 1961 and 1965. Sporadic recording followed later in the 1960s, both as a leader and behind Willie Mabon, Jack McDuff, Gene Ammons, and Roosevelt Sykes, whose August 1970 recording session was Kolax's last.

Kolax had a position in the Chicago Federation of Musicians, and union rules prevented him from performing and holding office simultaneously. He retired around 1981 and died in Chicago ten years later after suffering from Alzheimer's disease for an extended period. In 2024, the Killer Blues Headstone Project placed a headstone for him at Oakland Cemetery in Dolton, Illinois.

== Discography ==
=== As sideman ===
- Billy Eckstine, 1946–1947 (Classics, 1998)
- Billy Eckstine, The Legendary Big Band (Savoy, 2002)
- Jack McDuff, Tobacco Road (Atlantic, 1967)
- Roosevelt Sykes, Feel Like Blowing My Horn (Delmark, 1973)
- Joe Williams, Joe Williams (Savoy, 1984)
