= Memphis blues =

Style of blues music

- Stylistic origins: Blues; country blues; Delta blues
- Cultural origins: 1910s–1930s, Memphis, Tennessee, U.S.

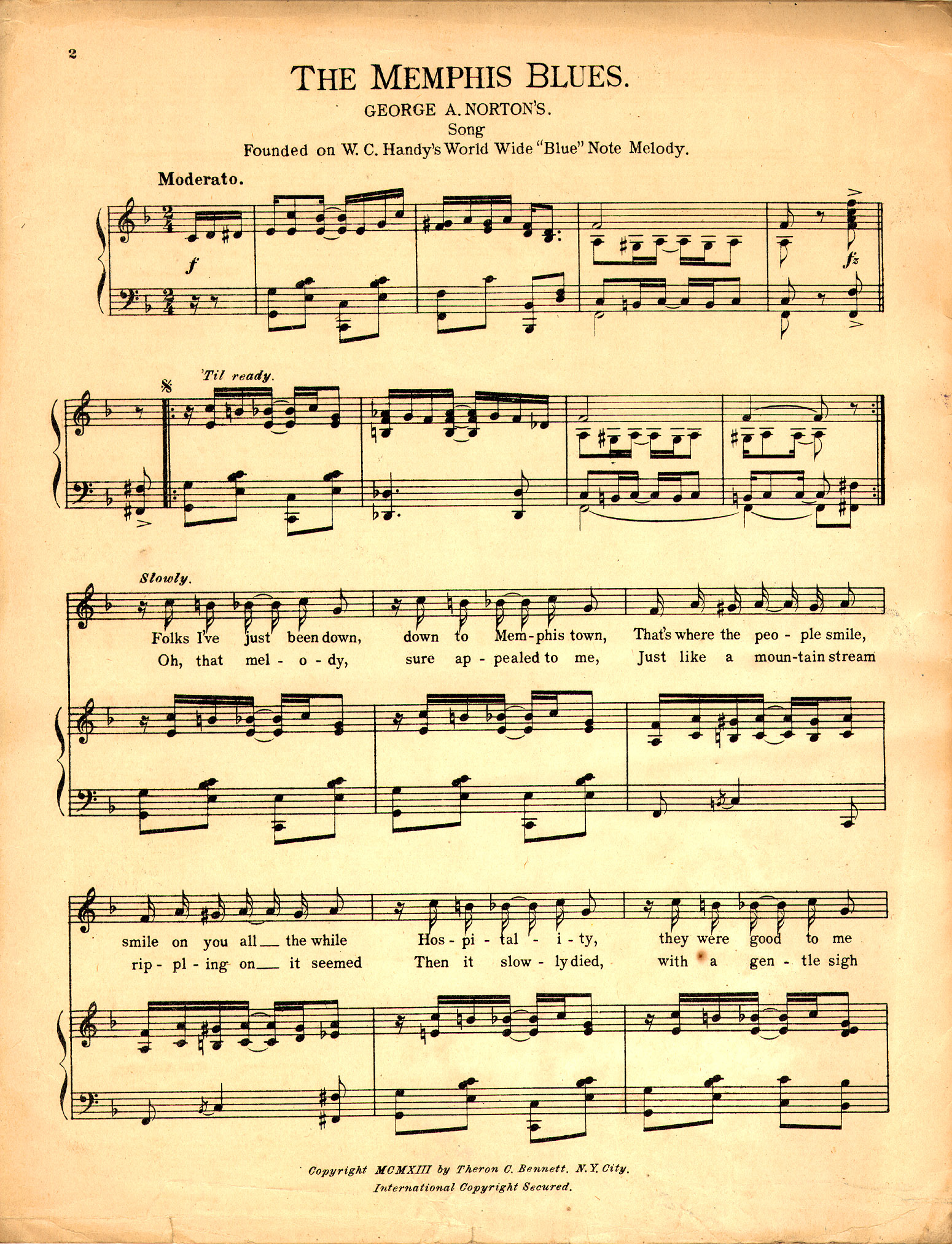
Sheet music for "The Memphis Blues"

The Memphis blues is a style of blues music created from the 1910s to the 1930s by musicians in the Memphis area, such as Frank Stokes, Sleepy John Estes, Furry Lewis and Memphis Minnie. The style was popular in vaudeville and medicine shows and was associated with Beale Street, the main entertainment area in Memphis.

W. C. Handy, the "Father of the Blues", published the song "The Memphis Blues" in 1909 and this was the first blues to be written down. In lyrics, the phrase has been used to describe a depressed mood.

== History ==
"The Memphis Blues" (1914)
"The Memphis Blues" (1914), composed by W. C. Handy in 1912 and recorded by the Victor Military Band in 1914, the first known commercial recording of Handy's first commercially successful blues composition

In addition to guitar-based blues, jug bands, such as Gus Cannon's Jug Stompers and the Memphis Jug Band, were extremely popular practitioners of Memphis blues. The jug band style emphasized the danceable, syncopated rhythms of early jazz and a range of other folk styles. It was played on simple, sometimes homemade, instruments such as harmonicas, violins, mandolins, banjos, and guitars, backed by washboards, kazoo, guimbarde and jugs blown to supply the bass.

After World War II, as African Americans left the Mississippi Delta and other impoverished areas of the South for urban areas, many musicians gravitated to the blues scene in Memphis, changing the classic Memphis blues sound. Musicians such as Howlin' Wolf, Willie Nix, Ike Turner, and B. B. King performed on Beale Street and in West Memphis and recorded some of the classic electric blues, rhythm-and-blues and rock-and-roll records for labels such as Sam Phillips's Sun Records. Sun recorded Howlin' Wolf (before he moved to Chicago), Willie Nix, Ike Turner, B. B. King and others. Electric Memphis blues featured "explosive, distorted electric guitar work, thunderous drumming, and fierce, declamatory vocals." Musicians associated with Sun Records included Joe Hill Louis, Willie Johnson and Pat Hare.
