= Jo Jo Adams =

American singer (1918–1988)

Background information
- Born: c. 1918; Alabama
- Died: February 27, 1988 (age approx. 70)
- Occupations: Singer, Comedian, Dancer, and MC

Joel Adams (c. 1918 – February 27, 1988), sometimes credited as Doctor Jo Jo Adams, was an American jump blues singer, comedian, dancer, and MC, who recorded in the 1940s and 1950s.

== Career ==
He was born in a rural area of Alabama, and sang with the Big Four Gospel Jubilee Singers before moving to Chicago in the early 1940s. He then began performing in clubs on the South Side of Chicago, adopting a style derivative of Cab Calloway, wearing a tuxedo with extended tails that would swing around while he danced. He said: "I introduced color to the stage. My tailor-made tails that were 55 inches long - when I spun around you could shoot dice on them!"

In 1946 he made his first recording, "Jo Jo Blues", with bandleader Freddie Williams for the Melody Lane record label, soon to be renamed Hy-Tone. He also recorded for Hy-Tone with guitarist Floyd Smith, including the marijuana-related song "When I'm In My Tea"; and recorded for the Aladdin label in Los Angeles with Maxwell Davis' band. After returning to Chicago, he recorded under Tom Archia's supervision for the Aristocrat label run by Leonard Chess. His recordings there included "Cabbage Head", a version of the folk song "Our Gudeman"/"Our Goodman", also known as "Seven Drunken Nights".

Adams appeared in the 1949 all-African American revue film Burlesque in Harlem, performing a risqué version of "The Hucklebuck". The following year, he began appearing regularly with Memphis Slim and Terry Timmons in clubs in Chicago, and at the end of the year performed at a New Year's Eve show with Lester Young and others. He also performed in his own revue, the "Jo Jo Show", which at various times featured singers Joe Williams, Willie Mabon, Bill Pinkard, and the Melvin Moore Combo. He made his last recordings in 1952 and 1953, for the Chance and Parrot labels; some of the latter recordings were arranged by Sun Ra.

== Later life and death ==
He continued to appear with his revue in Chicago nightclubs through most of the 1950s. His last credited performance was in 1958. After that, he gave up the music business except for occasionally playing in his local neighborhood. He died in Chicago in 1988, aged about 70.

== Anthology of early recordings ==
His early recordings were anthologised on CD by the French label, Chronological Classics, in 2004.
