= Willie Nix =

American drummer

Background information
- Also known as: The Memphis Blues Boy
- Born: August 6, 1922; Memphis, Tennessee, U.S.
- Died: July 8, 1991 (aged 68) Leland, Mississippi, U.S.
- Genres: Memphis blues; Chicago blues; electric blues
- Occupation: Musician
- Instruments: Vocals; drums; guitar
- Years active: 1940s–1970s
- Labels: RPM; Checker; Sun; Chance; Sabre

Willie Nix (August 6, 1922 – July 8, 1991) was an American Chicago blues singer and drummer, active in Memphis, Tennessee, in the 1940s and 1950s.

== Biography ==
Nix was born in Memphis. He learned to tap dance as a child and later, as a teenager, was a dancer and comedian with the Rabbit Foot Minstrels. This led to work in various variety shows in the 1940s, and Nix later became a part of the blues scene that grew up around Beale Street (see Memphis Blues). His talent for music led to performing on local radio with Robert Lockwood Jr. He joined Willie Love, Joe Willie Wilkins and Sonny Boy Williamson II, billed as the Four Aces, who toured the Deep South. In further Memphis radio performances in the mid-1940s, Nix played with B.B. King and with Joe Hill Louis. Later the same decade he worked with the Beale Streeters. In 1951, Nix made his first recording, for RPM Records, in Memphis. A year later he recorded for Checker Records.

He recorded for Sun Records and other labels in the 1950s, including the Chicago-based Chance Records and Sabre Records. Nix wrote the songs "Nervous Wreck" and "Try Me One More Time" and reworked others, such as "Catfish Blues" and Curtis Jones's "Lonesome Bedroom Blues." At various times he worked with Big Walter Horton, Elmore James, Johnny Shines, Memphis Slim, and Ike Turner. In the late 1950s Nix was briefly a member of Willie Cobbs's band.

By the end of the 1950s, Nix returned to Memphis. He spent a short time in prison before 1960. Over the next twenty years he performed sporadically. As his health declined, his behaviour became more eccentric. He did not record again, although his mid-1950s work is held in high regard for his lyrical dexterity and compelling beat.

Nix died in Leland, Mississippi, in 1991. In 2019 the Killer Blues Headstone Project placed the headstone for Willie Nix at Bogue Cemetery in Leland.
