= Burlesque in Harlem =

1949 film by William D. Alexander

Flyer showing posters for the original 1949 theatrical release

Poster for the 1954 re-release under the name Rock ‘n Roll Burlesque

Burlesque in Harlem (also released as Rock & Roll Burlesque and A French Peep Show) is a 1949 revue film directed by William D. Alexander. It features a cast of singers, dancers and comedians who were prominent on the Chitlin' Circuit of vaudeville theaters and nightclubs that exclusively presented African American talent.

The plotless film is hosted by Dick Barrow, who sings "Juice Head Baby", and the main headliner is the comedian Pigmeat Markham, who performs a sketch called The Love Making Bureau.

Other performers in the cast include the dancer Gertrude "Baby" Banks, the singers Jo Jo Adams and Hucklebuck Jones, the striptease contortionist Tarza Young, and the tap dance duo Slip and Slide.

== Description ==
Barrow, the master of ceremonies, invites the audience to a special "bronze burlesque", consisting of a series of performances from strip-tease dancers, burlesque singers, and the club comedians. The dance duo Slip and Slide does a soft-shoe routine. There is also a comedy sketch by Dewey "Pigmeat" Markham involving a "love-making bureau".

== Cast ==
- Vivian Harris (comedian)
- Dick Barrow, Master of ceremonies
- Jo Jo Adams
- Mabel Hunter
- Gertrude "Baby" Banks
- Luella Owens
- Princess D'Orsey
- Gloria Howard "Atomic Bomb"
- Slip and Slide
- Tarza Young
- The Betty Taylor Taylorettes
- Olive Sayles
- Maria Rout
- Adella Gross
- Ezella Lester
- Marion L. Greene
- Dorothy McCarty
- Fannie Thornton
- Griffen Trixie Terry
- Rose Marie Foster
- Gwendolyn Shaklett
