= Moody Jones =

Chicago blues guitarist, bass player, and singer (1908–1988)

- Born: April 8, 1908; Earle, Arkansas, United States
- Died: March 23, 1988 (aged 79) Chicago, Illinois, United States
- Genres: Chicago blues
- Instruments: Vocals, guitar, bass
- Years active: 1930s–1953

Moody Jones (April 8, 1908 – March 23, 1988) was an American blues guitarist, bass player, and singer who contributed to the development of the postwar Chicago blues sound in the late 1940s.

== Early life ==
Jones was born in Earle, Arkansas, on April 8, 1908. Raised in the church, he developed an interest in music at an early age and learned to play the guitar after his brother bought an old broken one for $3. When he was proficient enough, he started playing for country dances.

== Playing in Chicago ==
By 1939 he had arrived in Chicago, where he was one of a number of musicians, performing on Maxwell Street and in nonunion venues, who played an important role in the development of the postwar Chicago blues sound. He often performed with his first cousin, the singer and guitar player Floyd Jones. By the late 1940s he was capable of playing any kind of music requested and had learned to play the piano, banjo and bass (including a homemade bass fashioned from a washtub, a broom handle and a clothesline), in addition to the guitar. He was regarded by his contemporaries as the best guitar player on the Chicago scene; the noted slide guitar player Muddy Waters warned Jones not to "fool with that slide" when he sat in with Waters's band one night.

== Recordings ==
Jones is most significant and best known for the singles he recorded in 1948 with his cousin Floyd Jones and the harmonica player Snooky Pryor, which were among the first recorded examples of the new style. The track "Snooky and Moody's Boogie" is said to have been the inspiration for Little Walter's 1952 hit "Juke". Jones made further recordings for JOB Records in the early 1950s, backing musicians such as Snooky Pryor and Johnny Shines. He sang three numbers on a 1952 session, but these were not released at the time (because, according to Jones, the label's owner, Joe Brown, thought his voice was "too rough"). One of the songs, "Rough Treatment", was recorded by the singer and guitarist Little Hudson (Hudson Showers) and released on the same label the following year.

== Later life ==
After 1953 Jones stopped playing blues and joined a gospel group. By 1955 he had become a pastor of a Sanctified church.

Jones died in Chicago, on March 23, 1988. In 2016 the Killer Blues Headstone Project placed a headstone for Moody Jones at Restvale Cemetery in Alsip, Illinois.

== Sources ==
- Rowe, M. (1974). Chicago Breakdown. London: Eddison Press. ISBN 978-0856490156
