= Arthur "Big Boy" Spires =

American blues singer and guitarist (1912–1990)

Arthur Spires
- Also known as: Big Boy Spires
- Born: February 25, 1912; Natchez, Mississippi, United States
- Died: October 22, 1990 (aged 78) Chicago, Illinois, United States
- Genres: Blues
- Instrument(s): Vocals, guitar
- Years active: 1930s–1960s

Arthur "Big Boy" Spires (February 25, 1912 – October 22, 1990) was an American blues singer and guitarist who recorded for several record labels in Chicago in the 1950s and 1960s.

== Life and career ==
Spires was born in Natchez, Mississippi (some sources give his birthplace as Yazoo City), on February 25, 1912. He took up the guitar in the late 1930s and by 1939 or 1940 was proficient enough to work with Lightnin' Hopkins at the Beer Garden in Yazoo City.

In 1943 Spires moved to Chicago and started playing at house parties. By the early 1950s he was playing in clubs. Spires was limited as a guitarist, and during this time he recruited the young guitarists Louis and David Myers, who later went on to form the Aces, for his backing band.

At the time of his first recording session for Chess Records, in 1952, Spires was working with a band, the Rocket Four, with Eddie El on guitar and Willie "Big Eyes" Smith on drums and harmonica. The recording session featured the three-guitar lineup of Spires, El, and Earl Dranes, supplemented by Smith on maracas on one of the two tracks, "Murmur Low". Sales of the resulting single were poor, but both sides, especially "Murmur Low", which has a strong Tommy Johnson influence, are today regarded as classics of the Chicago blues genre.

A second recording session, for Chance Records in 1953, resulted in the release of another single, but an additional four sides by Spires and two by guitarist Johnny Williams remained unissued until the 1970s. Another session, in December 1954, produced four sides, and although the tapes went to United Records they were not released until 1989, possibly because of inferior sound quality.

Spires performed with the Rocket Four through the 1950s. He recorded another largely unissued session for Testament Records in 1965, but was forced to give up playing the guitar because of arthritis.

He died in Chicago on October 22, 1990. His son, Bud Spires, lived near Bentonia, Mississippi, where he recorded with the blues singer Jack Owens.

== Bibliography ==
- Rowe, M. (1981). Chicago Blues: The City and the Music. New York: Da Capo Press.
