= John Brim =

American musician (1922–2003)

- Born: John Charles Brim; April 10, 1922; Hopkinsville, Kentucky, U.S.
- Died: October 1, 2003 (aged 81) Gary, Indiana, U.S.
- Genres: Blues
- Instrument: Guitar

John Charles Brim (April 10, 1922 – October 1, 2003) was an American Chicago blues guitarist, songwriter, and singer. He wrote and recorded the song "Ice Cream Man" which was later covered by the rock band Van Halen for their first album, and by Martin Sexton on his 2001 album, Live Wide Open, and by David Lee Roth on his album Diamond Dave and by Swedish band FJK as "Isglasskis".

== Biography ==
Brim began playing guitar by studying the recordings of Big Bill Broonzy and Tampa Red. He moved to Indianapolis in 1941 and Chicago in 1947. His wife, Grace, was also a talented musician, playing drums and harmonica.

Brim recorded for several labels, including Chess Records. "Ice Cream Man" was recorded on May 4, 1953, but not released until 1968. Other tracks recorded for Chess include "I Would Hate to See You Go" (1956). The album Whose Muddy Shoes includes all his songs from the 1950s on that label.

Brim also operated a dry cleaners and a record store. He used his royalties from Van Halen's recording of "Ice Cream Man" to open a nightclub in Chicago.

He continued to perform occasionally around Chicago and was a regularly featured performer at the Chicago Blues Festival beginning in 1991, when he was backed by a Chicago blues band, the Ice Cream Men (drummer Steve Cushing, guitarists Dave Waldman and "Rockin'" Johnny Burgin, and harmonica player Scott Dirks). The name of the band was coincidental; they were not Brim's regular band and had been using the name because the members had previously worked with the Chicago bluesman Otis "Big Smokey" Smothers, who worked as an ice cream man on Chicago's South Side.

Brim recorded four songs for the German label Wolf in 1989. A studio album, Ice Cream Man, was released by Tone Cool Records in 1994. It was nominated for a W. C. Handy Award as the Best Traditional Blues Album of the Year.

Brim appeared at the 1997 San Francisco Blues Festival. He recorded another album Jake's Blues in 2000 and continued to give live performances, including in Belgium in 2001 and at the Chicago Blues Festival in 2002.

== Death ==
Brim died following a year-long battle with heart cancer at 81 years old on October 1, 2003. His funeral was held on October 10, 2003.

== Studio albums ==
- The Ice Cream Man (Tone Cool, 1994)
- Jake's Blues (Anna Bee, 2000)

== See also ==
- List of Chicago blues musicians
- List of electric blues musicians
- J.O.B. Records discography
