= Brother John Sellers =

Brother John Sellers (May 27, 1924, Clarksdale, Mississippi, United States – March 27, 1999, Manhattan) was an American gospel and folk singer.

Sellers played in gospel tent shows while young. He was discovered by Mahalia Jackson, who brought him to Chicago in the 1930s to perform with her. He subsequently toured with Jackson in the 1940s. In the 1950s, he began playing secular music, and recorded his first album in 1954 for Vanguard Records. While on tour in Europe he recorded with Big Bill Broonzy.

Later in the 1950s, Sellers relocated to New York City, where he became active on the folk revival scene of Greenwich Village. He started a longtime partnership with Alvin Ailey, working with him as a musician on dance performances such as "Revelations" and "Blues Suite". Sellers was involved in the Broadway production of Tambourines to Glory by Langston Hughes, and performed at appearances by Studs Terkel. He also played on the Ella Jenkins record A Long Time to Freedom.

Sellers died in Manhattan, New York, in March 1999, at the age of 74.

== Discography ==
- Brother John Sellers (Vanguard, 1954)
- Sings Blues and Folk Songs (Vanguard, 1954)
- Baptist Shouts and Gospel Songs (Monitor/Smithsonian Folkways)
- Brother John Sellers in London (London Records, 1957)
- Big Boat Up The River (Monitor/Smithsonian Folkways)
- Classic Protest Songs from Smithsonian Folkways (Smithsonian Folkways)
- Let Praise Arise (Integrity Music, 1984)
