= Homesick James =

American blues slide guitarist (1910–2006)

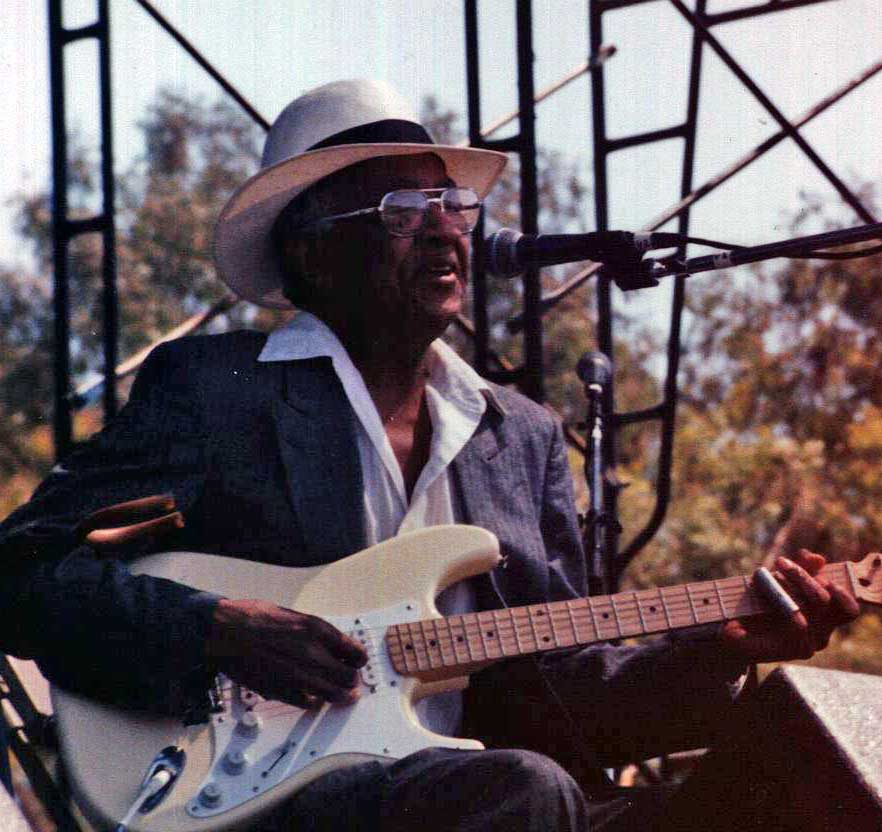
- James at the Long Beach Blues Festival, 1994

Background information
- Born: James Williams or; James Williamson or; John William Henderson; April 30, 1910; Somerville, Tennessee, U.S.
- Died: December 13, 2006 (aged 96) Springfield, Missouri, U.S.
- Genres: Blues
- Occupation: Musician
- Instrument(s): Vocals, slide guitar

Homesick James (April 30, 1910 – December 13, 2006) was an American blues musician known for his mastery of the slide guitar. He worked with his cousin, Elmore James, and with Sonny Boy Williamson II.

== Early years ==
Homesick James was born in Somerville, Tennessee, United States, the son of Cordellia Henderson and Plez Williamson Rivers, who were both musicians. The year of his birth is uncertain. He stated that he was born in 1905, 1910, or 1914, while his union records give 1924. His actual birth name has given as James Williamson or John Henderson.

Little is known about his early life. He developed a self-taught style of slide guitar through playing at local dances in his teens. He claimed to have played with Yank Rachell, Sleepy John Estes, Blind Boy Fuller, Sonny Boy Williamson II and Big Joe Williams, among others. He also claimed to be the older cousin of Elmore James, to have bought James his first guitar, and to have taught him how to play slide. However, some of these claims are unconfirmed.

In 1932, he relocated to Chicago, Illinois, working with Horace Henderson's band at the Circle Inn and with the pianist Jimmy Walker at the Square Deal Club. He may have first recorded for RCA Victor in 1937, but this is also unconfirmed, and by 1938 may have begun playing electric guitar. His first known recordings were in 1952 for Chance Records, recording the tracks "Lonesome Ole Train" and "Homesick", which gave him his stage name. During the late 1940s and 1950s he worked with Sonny Boy Williamson II (Rice Miller), and with Elmore James, and in the early 1950s he worked in bands including Baby Face Leroy Foster, Snooky Pryor, Floyd Jones, and Lazy Bill Lucas. He was a member of Elmore James's band from 1955 to 1963, contributing to such tracks as "Dust My Broom," "The Sky Is Crying," and "Roll and Tumble." Elmore James is said to have died on Homesick's couch, while the latter frantically searched for the former's heart pills.

== Solo performer ==
As a solo performer, he recorded for the Colt and USA labels in 1962, including a cover version of Robert Johnson's "Crossroads". His slide guitar style, not as refined as Elmore James's, traces back to Johnson's. He also recorded a 1964 album for Prestige Records, Blues on the South Side (Prestige OBCCD 529-2), including another of his best-known covers, "Stones in My Passway", and some tracks for Vanguard, which are available on the compilation album Chicago: The Blues Today.

== Later years and death ==
During the 1970s, Homesick was reintroduced to European audiences through his participation in the 1973 and 1975 editions of the American Blues Legends tours and albums organized by Big Bear Records, also recording a solo album Home Sweet Homesick James and a duo album with Snooky Pryor for the UK-based label.

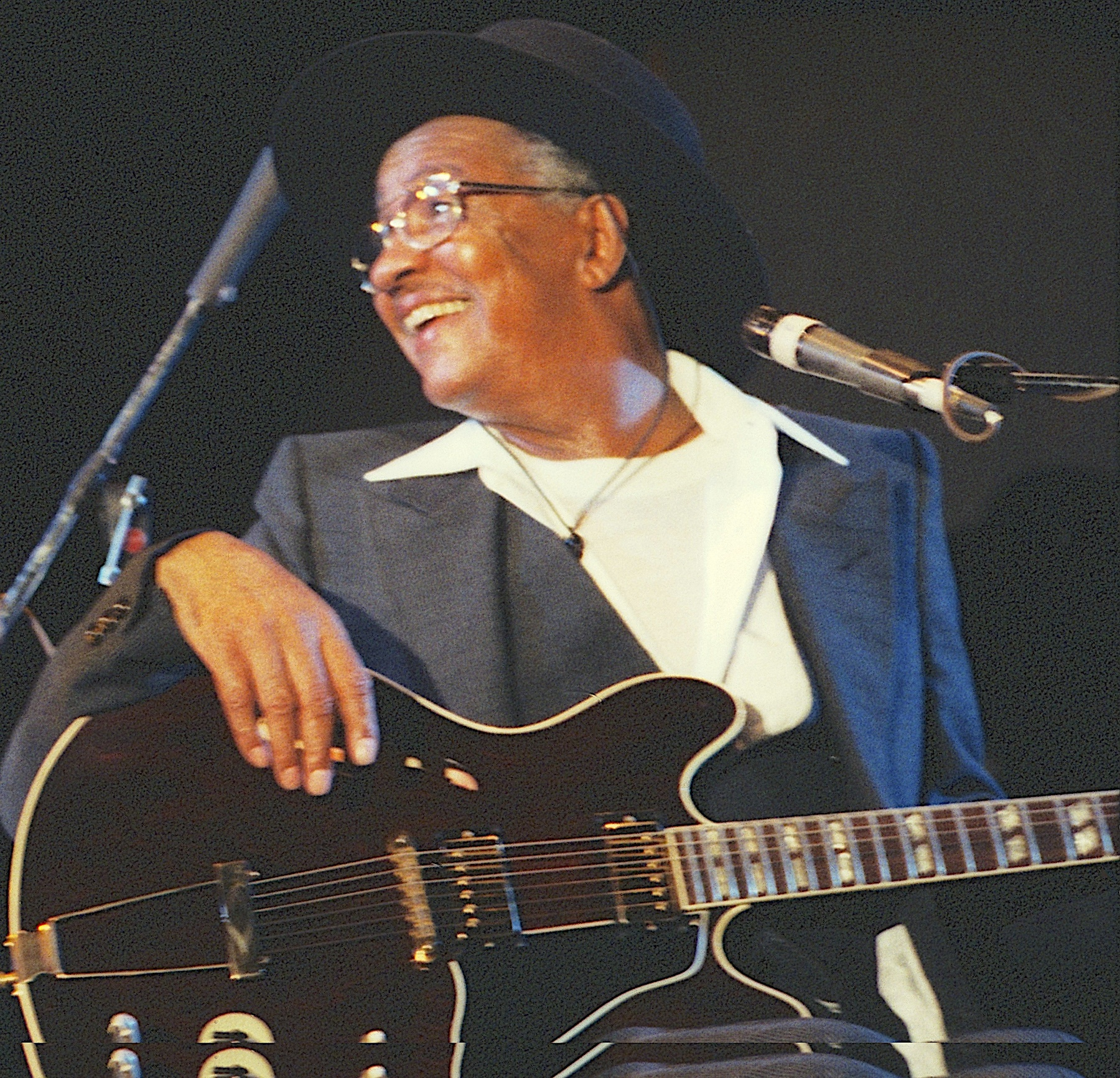
Homesick James at the National Downhome Blues Festival, Atlanta, Georgia, 1984.

One of his own songs, "Gotta Move" (also on Blues on the South Side) was covered (as "Got to Move") by Elmore James and by Fleetwood Mac. He is mentioned by name in the 1989 song "Fergus Sings the Blues" by the Scottish rock band Deacon Blue, with the lyric "Homesick James, my biggest influence".

From 1972 through 2006, Homesick lived in Chicago, Nashville, Atlanta, Fresno and finally Springfield, Missouri, where he died at the age of 96.

== Partial discography ==
- 1963: Hard Drivin' Blues (Delmark) with Roosevelt Sykes
- 1964: Blues on the South Side (Prestige/Original Blues)
- 1972: The Country Blues (Blues On Blues)
- 1973: Ain't Sick No More (Bluesway)
- 1973: Homesick James Williamson & Snooky Pryor (Caroline under licence from Big Bear)
- 1976: Home Sweet Homesick James (Big Bear)
- 1977: Goin' Back Home (32 Jazz)
- 1979: Chicago Blues Festival Vol. 1 (Black and Blue)
- 1980: Homesick James & Snooky Pryor: Sad and Lonesome (Wolf)
- 1992: Sweet Home Tennessee (as Homesick James & The Hypnotics) (Appaloosa)
- 1994: Goin' Back in the Times (Earwig)
- 1995: Got to Move (Trix Records)
- 1994: Juanita (Appaloosa)
- 1997: Words of Wisdom (Priority)
- 1998: Last of the Broomdusters (Fedora)
- 2003: Homesick James & Snooky Prior: The Big Bear Sessions (Sanctuary Records)
