= Electric blues =

Type of blues music

- Stylistic origins: Blues
- Cultural origins: Late 1930s, United States
- Derivative forms: Blues rock; British blues; hard rock; rock and roll

Regional scenes
- West Coast blues; Chicago blues; Memphis blues; Detroit blues; Texas blues; New Orleans blues

Electric blues is blues music distinguished by the use of electric amplification for musical instruments. The guitar was the first instrument to be popularly amplified and used by early pioneers T-Bone Walker in the late 1930s and John Lee Hooker and Muddy Waters in the 1940s. Their styles developed into West Coast blues, Detroit blues, and post-World War II Chicago blues, which differed from earlier, predominantly acoustic-style blues. By the early 1950s, Little Walter was a featured soloist on blues harmonica using a small hand-held microphone fed into a guitar amplifier. Although it took a little longer, the electric bass guitar gradually replaced the upright bass by the early 1960s. Keyboards, especially electric organs and electric pianos, later became widely used in electric blues.

== Early development (1930s-1940s) ==
The blues, like jazz, probably began to be amplified in the late 1930s. The first star of the electric blues is generally recognized as being T-Bone Walker; born in Texas but moving to Los Angeles in the mid-1930s, he combined blues with elements of swing music and jazz in a long and prolific career. In its early stages electric blues typically used amplified electric guitars, double bass (which was progressively replaced by bass guitar), and harmonica played through a microphone and a power amp or a guitar amplifier.

By the late 1940s several Chicago-based blues artists had begun to use amplification, including John Lee Williamson and Johnny Shines. Early recordings in the new style were made in 1947 and 1948 by musicians such as Johnny Young, Floyd Jones, and Snooky Pryor. The format was perfected by Muddy Waters, who utilized various small groups that provided a strong rhythm section and powerful harmonica. His "I Can't Be Satisfied" (1948) was followed by a series of ground-breaking recordings. Chicago blues was influenced to a large extent by the Mississippi blues style, because many performers had migrated from the Mississippi region. Howlin' Wolf, Muddy Waters, Willie Dixon and Jimmy Reed were all born in Mississippi and moved to Chicago during the Great Migration. In addition to electric guitar, harmonica, and a rhythm section of bass and drums, some performers such as J. T. Brown who played in Elmore James's bands or J. B. Lenoir's also used saxophones, largely as a supporting instrument. Little Walter, Sonny Boy Williamson (Rice Miller) and Big Walter Horton were among the best-known harmonica (called "blues harp" by blues musicians) players of the early Chicago blues scene and the sound of electric instruments and harmonica is often seen as characteristic of electric Chicago blues. Muddy Waters and Elmore James were known for their innovative use of slide electric guitar. Howlin' Wolf and Muddy Waters were known for their deep, "gravelly" voices. Bassist and composer Willie Dixon played a major role on the Chicago blues scene. He composed and wrote many standard blues songs of the period, such as "Hoochie Coochie Man", "I Just Want to Make Love to You" (both penned for Muddy Waters) and, "Wang Dang Doodle", "Spoonful" and "Back Door Man" for Howlin' Wolf. Most artists of the Chicago blues style recorded for the Chicago-based Chess Records and Checker Records labels; there were also smaller blues labels in this era including Vee-Jay Records and J.O.B. Records.

== Post-World War II urban expansion ==
After World War II, from 1946 to 1960, amplified blues music became more widespread across American cities. Amplified blues music became popular in American cities that had seen widespread African American migration, such as Chicago, Memphis, Detroit, St. Louis, and the West Coast. The initial impulse was to be heard above the noise of lively rent parties. Playing in small venues, electric blues bands tended to remain modest in size compared with larger jazz bands.

Following the Great Depression and World Wars, many African Americans fled the South. Blues music scattered across the country, especially in urban cities. Shifting from the Mississippi delta to Chicago, blues artists such as John Lee "Sonny Boy" Williamson started experimenting with amplification. In cities like Chicago and Detroit, blues music transformed slightly with the implementation of electric guitars and amplified harmonicas. The lyrics of blues music adopted urban themes, with the Chicago blues being one of the most influential subgenres to emerge in the post-World War II period. Infamous blues artists such as Muddy Waters, Elmore James, and Howlin' Wolf originated during this period. This time period coincided with the emergence of rock and roll music, which later became one of the most culturally and commercially influential music genres of the 20th-century. By 1951, Ike Turner and his Kings of Rhythm recorded "Rocket 88," often cited as one of the first rock and roll records. The foundation for rock and roll lead guitar was paved by Chuck Berry's "Maybellene" in 1955.

== Regional developments (1950s-1960s) ==
In the late 1950s, the West Side style blues emerged in Chicago with major figures including Magic Sam, Jimmy Dawkins, Magic Slim and Otis Rush. West Side clubs were more accessible to white audiences, but performers were mainly black, or part of mixed combos. West Side blues incorporated elements of blues rock but with a greater emphasis on standards and traditional blues song forms. Albert King, Buddy Guy, and Luther Allison had a West Side style that was dominated by amplified electric lead guitar.

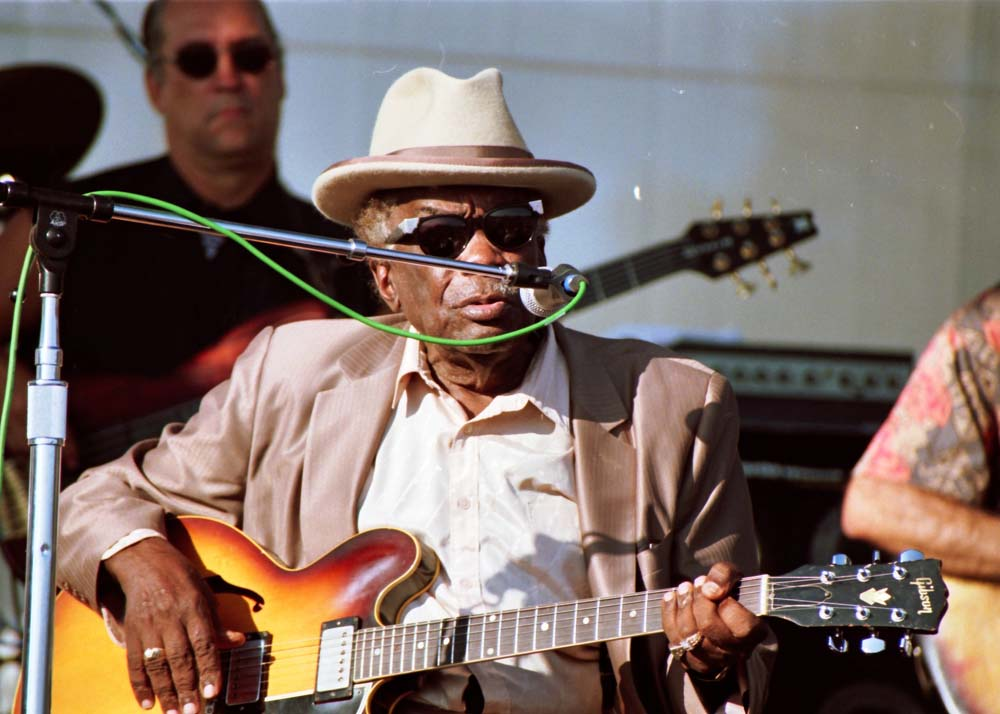
John Lee Hooker created his own blues style and renewed it several times during his long career.

Memphis, with its flourishing acoustic blues scene based in Beale Street, also developed an electric blues sound during the early 1950s. Sam Phillips' Sun Records company recorded musicians such as Howlin' Wolf (before he moved to Chicago), Willie Nix, Ike Turner, and B.B. King. Other Memphis blues musicians involved with Sun Records included Joe Hill Louis, Willie Johnson and Pat Hare who introduced electric guitar techniques such as distorted and power chords, anticipating elements of heavy metal music. These players had an influence on early rock and rollers and rockabillies, many of whom also recorded for Sun Records. After Phillips discovered Elvis Presley in 1954, the Sun label turned to the rapidly expanding white audience and started recording mostly rock and roll. Booker T. & the M.G.'s carried the electric blues style into the 1960s.

Detroit-based John Lee Hooker pursued a unique brand of electric blues based on his deep rough voice accompanied by a single electric guitar. Though not directly influenced by boogie-woogie, his "groovy" style is sometimes called "guitar boogie". His first hit, "Boogie Chillen", reached #1 on the R&B charts in 1949. He continued to play and record until his death in 2001.

The New Orleans blues musician Guitar Slim recorded "The Things That I Used to Do" (1953), which featured an electric guitar solo with distorted overtones and became a major R&B hit in 1954. It is regarded as one of the Rock and Roll Hall of Fame's 500 Songs that Shaped Rock and Roll, and contributed to the development of soul music.

In the 1950s, blues had a huge influence on mainstream American popular music. While popular musicians like Bo Diddley and Chuck Berry, both recording for Chess, were influenced by the Chicago blues, their enthusiastic playing styles departed from the melancholy aspects of blues and played a major role in the development of rock and roll. Chicago blues also influenced Louisiana's zydeco music, with Clifton Chenier using blues accents. Zydeco musicians used electric solo guitar and Cajun arrangements of blues standards.

== British electric styles ==
British blues emerged from the skiffle and folk club scene of the late 1950s, particularly in London, which included the playing of American acoustic blues. Critical was the visit of Muddy Waters in 1958, who initially shocked British audiences by playing amplified electric blues, but who was soon performing to ecstatic crowds and rave reviews. This inspired guitarist and blues harpist Cyril Davies and guitarist Alexis Korner to plug in and they began to play a high-powered electric blues that became the model for the subgenre, forming the band Blues Incorporated. Blues Incorporated was something of a clearing house for British blues musicians in the later 1950s and early 1960s, with many joining, or sitting in on sessions. These included future Rolling Stones, Mick Jagger, Charlie Watts and Brian Jones; Cream founders Jack Bruce and Ginger Baker; and Graham Bond and Long John Baldry. Blues Incorporated was given a residency at the Marquee Club and it was from there that in 1962 they took the name of the first British Blues album, R&B from the Marquee for Decca, but split before its release. The model of British rhythm and blues was emulated by a number of bands including the Rolling Stones, the Animals, the Small Faces, and the Yardbirds.

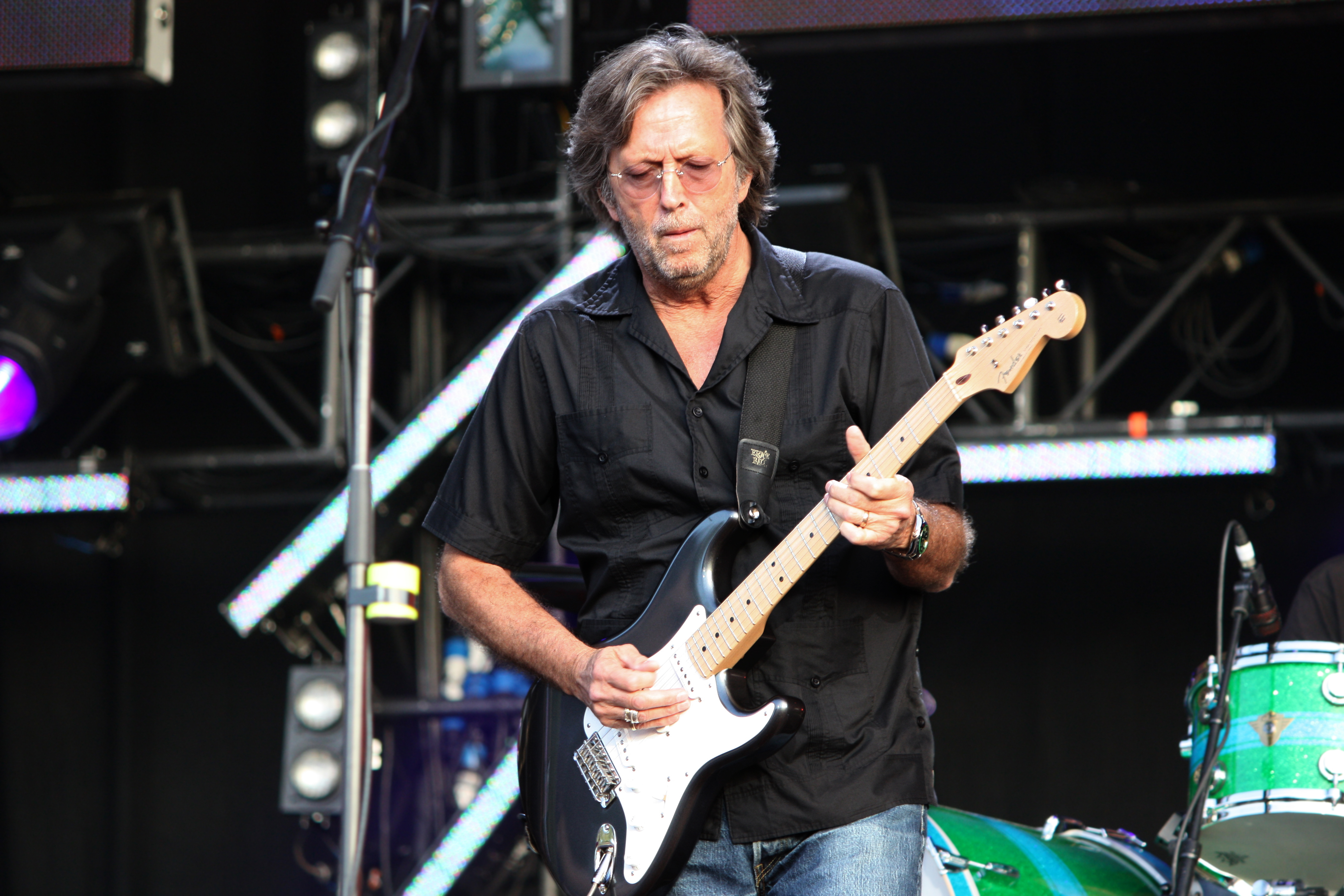
Clapton in 2008, one of the major figures of the British blues boom in the 1960s.

The other key focus for British blues was around John Mayall who moved to London in the early 1960s, eventually forming the Bluesbreakers, whose members at various times included, Jack Bruce, Aynsley Dunbar, Eric Clapton, Peter Green and Mick Taylor. The Blues Breakers with Eric Clapton (Beano) album (1966) is considered one of the seminal British blues recordings. It was notable for its driving rhythms and Clapton's rapid blues licks with a full distorted sound derived from a Gibson Les Paul and a Marshall amp, which became something of a classic combination for British blues (and later rock) guitarists. It also made clear the primacy of the guitar, seen as a distinctive characteristic of the subgenre. Clapton left to form Cream with Baker and Bruce and his replacement was Peter Green, who in turn (with the then Bluesbreaker's rhythm section Mick Fleetwood and John McVie) left in 1967 to form Peter Green's Fleetwood Mac. Incorporating elements of rock led these bands to a hybrid form known as blues rock.

== Blues rock ==
Blues rock combines blues with rock. With some notable exceptions, blues rock has largely been played by white musicians, bringing a rock sensitivity to blues standards and forms and it played a major role in widening the appeal of the blues to white American audiences. In 1963, American guitarist Lonnie Mack had developed a blues rock guitar style, releasing several guitar instrumentals, the best-known of which are the hit singles "Memphis" (Billboard #5) and "Wham!" (Billboard #24). The Paul Butterfield Blues Band and Canned Heat were among the earliest exponents and "attempted to play long, involved improvisations which were commonplace on jazz records". In the UK, blues rock was popularized by bands as Fleetwood Mac, Free, Savoy Brown and the groups formed around the three major guitarists that emerged from the Yardbirds, Eric Clapton, Jeff Beck and Jimmy Page.

After leaving the Yardbirds and his work with John Mayall and the Bluesbreakers, Eric Clapton formed supergroups Cream, Blind Faith and Derek and the Dominos, followed by a solo career. In the late 1960s Jeff Beck added elements heavy rock with his band, the Jeff Beck Group. Jimmy Page formed the New Yardbirds, which became Led Zeppelin. Many of the songs on their first two albums and occasionally later in their careers, were expansions on traditional blues songs.

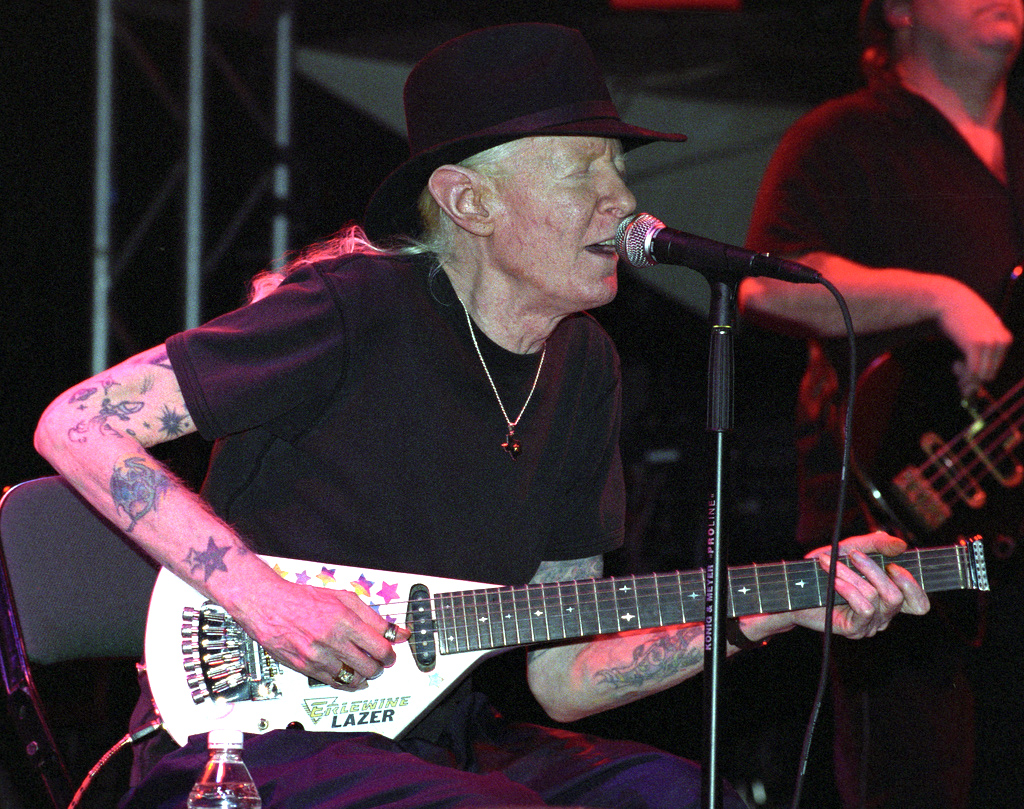
Johnny Winter in 2007.

Janis Joplin, Johnny Winter, and The J. Geils Band later popularized the style in the US. The revolutionary electric guitar playing of Jimi Hendrix with the Experience and Band of Gypsys, influenced blues rock guitarists. Blues rock bands like Allman Brothers Band, Lynyrd Skynyrd, and eventually ZZ Top from the American South, incorporated country elements into their style to produce Southern rock.

By the 1970s, blues rock had become heavier and more riff-based, exemplified by the work of Led Zeppelin and Deep Purple, and the lines between blues rock and hard rock "were barely visible", as bands began recording rock-style albums. The genre was continued in the 1970s by figures such as George Thorogood and Pat Travers. Except perhaps for groups such as Status Quo and Foghat in the UK, who moved towards a form of high energy and repetitive boogie rock, bands moved towards heavy metal and blues rock began to slip out of the mainstream. More recently, the White Stripes, the Black Crowes, the Black Keys, Clutch, the Jon Spencer Blues Explosion, and Joe Bonamassa have explored a more roots oriented, but edgier style.

== Electric Texas blues ==
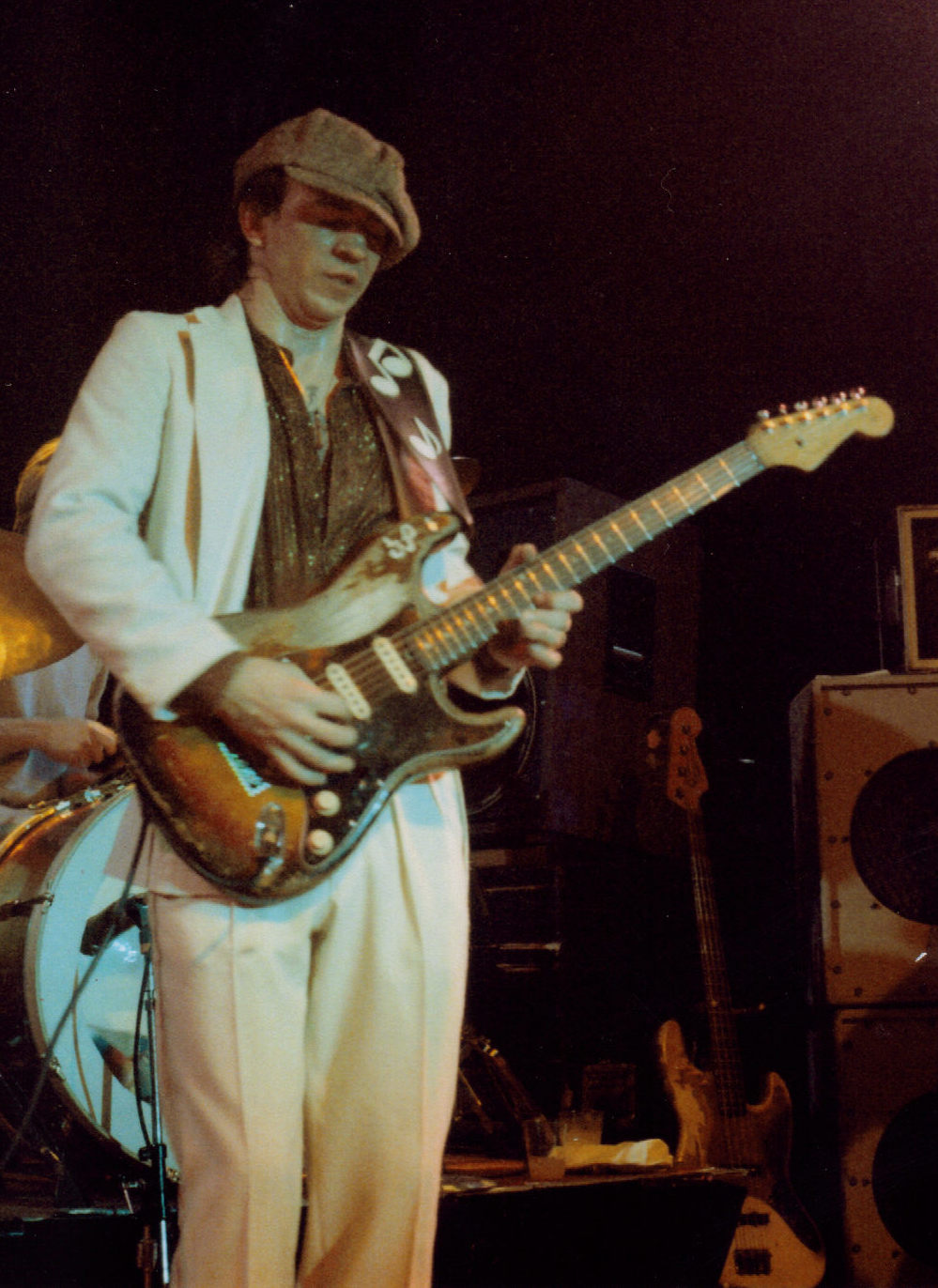
Stevie Ray Vaughan was the most prominent figure in Texas electric blues in the late 20th century

Texas had had a long history of major acoustic blues performers like Blind Lemon Jefferson and Lightnin' Hopkins, but by the 1940s many Texas blues artists had moved elsewhere to further their careers, including T-Bone Walker who relocated to Los Angeles to record his most influential records in the 1940s. His R&B influenced backing and saxophone imitating lead guitar sound would become an influential part of the electric blues sound. Goree Carter's "Rock Awhile" (1949) featured an over-driven electric guitar style and has been cited as a strong contender for the "first rock and roll record" title.

The state R&B recording industry was based in Houston with labels like Duke/Peacock, which in the 1950s provided a base for artists who would later pursue the electric Texas blues sound, including Johnny Copeland and Albert Collins. Freddie King, a major influence on electric blues, was born in Texas, but moved to Chicago as a teenager. His instrumental number "Hide Away" (1961), was emulated by British blues artists including Eric Clapton.

In the late 1960s and early 1970s the Texas electric blues scene began to flourish, influenced by country music and blues rock, particularly in the clubs of Austin. The diverse style often featured instruments like keyboards and horns, but placed particular emphasis on powerful lead guitar breaks. The most prominent artists to emerge in this era were the brothers Johnny and Edgar Winter, who combined traditional and southern styles. In the 1970s Jimmie formed the Fabulous Thunderbirds and in the 1980s his brother Stevie Ray Vaughan broke through to mainstream success with his virtuoso guitar playing, as did ZZ Top with their brand of Southern rock.

== Contemporary electric blues ==
Since the end of the 1960s, electric blues has declined in mainstream popularity, but retained a strong following in the US, Britain and elsewhere, with many musicians that began their careers as early as the 1950s continuing to record and perform, occasionally producing breakthrough stars. In the 1970s and 1980s, it absorbed a number of different influences, including particularly rock and soul music. Stevie Ray Vaughan was the biggest star influenced by blues rock and opened the way for guitarists including Kenny Wayne Shepherd and Jonny Lang. Practitioners of soul-influenced electric blues in the 1970s and 1980s included Joe Louis Walker and most successfully Robert Cray, whose Strong Persuader album (1986), with its fluid guitar sound and an intimate vocal style, produced a major crossover hit. Veteran Linsey Alexander is known for his original Chicago blues influenced by soul, R&B, and funk.

Since her breakthrough commercial success Nick of Time (1989), Bonnie Raitt has been one of the leading artists in acoustic and electric blues, doing much to promote the profile of older blues artists. After the renewed success of John Lee Hooker with his collaborative album The Healer (1989), several artists began to return to electric blues, including Gary Moore, beginning with Still Got the Blues (1990) and Eric Clapton with From the Cradle (1994).

== The influence and legacy of blues ==
Blues music evolved from a form of expression for African Americans to a widely appreciated genre is globally influential. Blues music is widely regarded as one of the most influential music genre of the 20th century, impacting and shaping the development of popular musical styles, such as rock and roll and soul. Rock and roll and hip-hop often implement musical elements that characterize the blues genre. The blues genre is not only popular in the United States, but is a genre that can be found across the UK. There are contemporary blues musicians in the UK who reimagine the genre in their own way. UK blues singer, Elles Bailey, is influenced by the blending of various different genres, such as Americana and rock and roll. Countless popular artists adapted and expanded it's sound, allowing blues music to stay present and relevant for over 100 years of history. Many modern musicians are influenced by the blues genre, with many of the most listened to genres drawing inspiration from blues music. Some of the many influenced genres include rock and roll, hip-hop, and country music. Despite the growth of genres such as pop, rock and roll, and jazz music, the legacy of blues continues to reflect in current music.

== See also ==
- List of electric blues musicians
