= J.O.B. Records =

American independent record label

- Founded: 1949
- Country of origin: United States

J.O.B. Records was an American, Chicago based independent record label, founded by businessman Joe Brown and bluesman St. Louis Jimmy Oden in 1949. It specialized in Southern blues and city based R&B. In 1952, the label's recording of "Five Long Years" by Eddie Boyd became a hit and reached number one in the US Billboard R&B chart. In 1953, J.O.B. had a temporary collaboration with Chance Records. The company recorded sparingly until 1972, when it sold its catalogue to Jewel Records. J.O.B.'s last single was released in 1974. J.O.B. Records worldwide rights were acquired by 43 North Broadway, LLC in 2015.

Artists recording for J.O.B. included: Eddie Boyd, Willie Cobbs, Floyd Jones, King Kolax, J. B. Lenoir, Snooky Pryor, Johnny Shines, and Sunnyland Slim,

There was a similarly named, but unrelated, record label located in Louisiana in 1950.

== See also ==
- J.O.B. Records discography
- List of record labels
