= Floyd Jones =

American blues singer, guitarist and songwriter (1917–1989)

- Born: July 21, 1917; Marianna, Arkansas, United States
- Died: December 19, 1989 (aged 72) Chicago, Illinois, United States
- Genres: Blues
- Instruments: Vocals, guitar, bass guitar
- Years active: 1930s–1980s

Floyd Jones (July 21, 1917 – December 19, 1989) was an American blues singer, guitarist and songwriter. He was one of the first of the new generation of electric blues artists to record in Chicago after World War II, and a number of his recordings are regarded as classics of the Chicago blues idiom.

== Early life ==
Jones was born in Marianna, Arkansas. He started playing the guitar seriously after being given one by Howlin' Wolf, and worked as an itinerant musician in Arkansas and Mississippi in the 1930s and early 1940s. He settled in Chicago in 1945.

== Playing in Chicago ==
In Chicago, Jones took up the electric guitar and was one of a number of musicians, playing on Maxwell Street and in nonunion venues in the late 1940s, who played an important role in the development of the postwar Chicago blues. This group included Little Walter and Jimmy Rogers, both of whom went on to become mainstays of the Muddy Waters band; Snooky Pryor; Jones's cousin Moody Jones and the mandolin player Johnny Young.

== Recordings ==
Jones's first recording session in 1947, with Pryor on harmonica and Moody on guitar, produced the sides "Stockyard Blues" and "Keep What You Got", which formed one of the two records released by the Marvel label. They are one of the earliest examples of the new style on record. A second session, in 1949, resulted in a release on the similarly short-lived Tempo-Tone label.

During the 1950s Jones's records were released by JOB, Chess and Vee-Jay. In 1966, he recorded for the Testament label's Masters of Modern Blues series, on a session shared with singer and guitarist Eddie Taylor.

Unusually for a blues artist of his era, several of his songs have economic or social themes, such as "Stockyard Blues" (which refers to a strike at the Union Stock Yards), "Hard Times" and "Schooldays". His song "On the Road Again" was a top 10 hit for Canned Heat in 1968.

== Later career and death ==
Jones continued performing in Chicago for the rest of his life, but he had few further recording opportunities. The album Old Friends Together for the First Time, featuring Jones and David "Honeyboy" Edwards, Sunnyland Slim, Big Walter Horton, and Kansas City Red, was released by Earwig in 1981. Jones sang and played lead guitar on "Mr. Freddy Blues" and sang on "Banty Rooster". In the latter part of his career the electric bass became his main instrument.

He died in Chicago on December 19, 1989, and was buried at Mount Glenwood Memory Gardens, in Willow Springs, Illinois.
