= Snooky Pryor =

American Chicago blues harmonica player (c. 1919–2006)

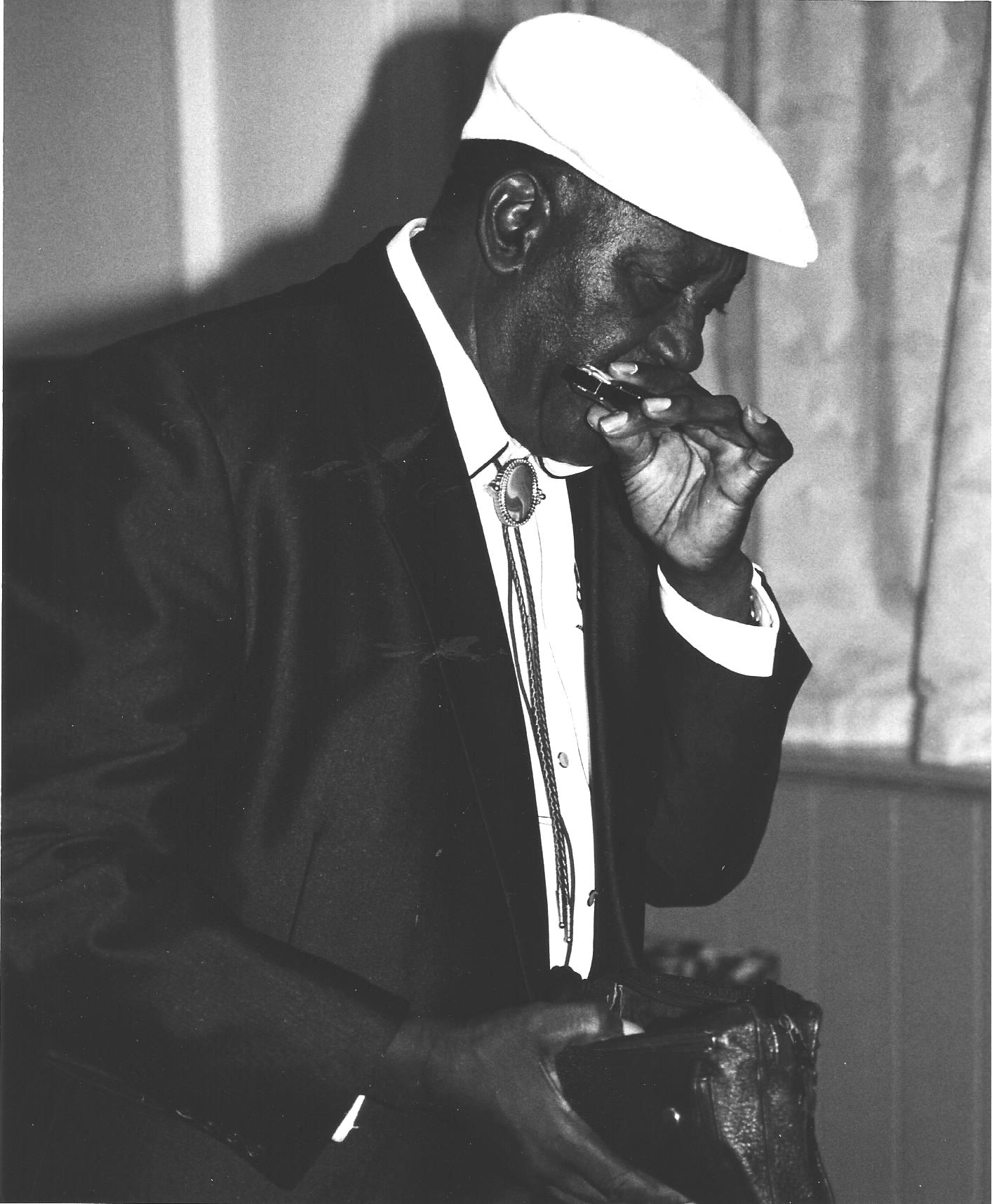
- Pryor in Edinburgh in 1993

Background information
- Born: James Edward Pryor; September 15, 1919 or 1921; Lambert, Mississippi, U.S.
- Died: October 18, 2006 (aged 85 or 87) Cape Girardeau, Missouri, U.S.
- Genres: Chicago blues; Delta blues
- Occupation: Musician
- Instruments: Harmonica; vocals
- Years active: 1945–2006
- Labels: Vee-Jay; Virgin; ABC; Blind Pig; Telarc; Electro-Fi

James Edward "Snooky" Pryor (September 15, 1919 or 1921 – October 18, 2006) was an American Chicago blues harmonica player. He claimed to have pioneered the now-common method of playing amplified harmonica by cupping a small microphone in his hands along with the harmonica, although on his earliest records, in the late 1940s, he did not use this method. In 2023, he was inducted in the Blues Hall of Fame.

== Career ==
Pryor was born in Lambert, Mississippi, United States. He developed a country blues style influenced by Sonny Boy Williamson I (John Lee Williamson) and Sonny Boy Williamson II (Aleck Ford "Rice" Miller). In the mid-1930s, in and around Vance, Mississippi, Pryor played in impromptu gatherings of three or four harmonica players, including Jimmy Rogers, who then lived nearby and had yet to take up playing the guitar. Pryor moved to Chicago around 1940.

While serving in the U.S. Army he would blow bugle calls through a PA system, which led him to experiment with playing the harmonica that way. However, most historians credit the idea to Little Walter. Upon discharge from the Army in 1945, he obtained his own amplifier and began playing harmonica at the outdoor Maxwell Street Market, becoming a regular on the Chicago blues scene.

Pryor recorded some of the first post-war Chicago blues in 1948, including "Telephone Blues" and "Snooky & Moody's 'Boogie'", with the guitarist Moody Jones, and "Stockyard Blues" and "Keep What You Got", with the singer and guitarist Floyd Jones. "Snooky & Moody's 'Boogie'" is of considerable historical significance: Pryor claimed that the harmonica virtuoso Little Walter directly copied the signature riff of Pryor's song in the opening eight bars of his blues harmonica instrumental "Juke," an R&B hit in 1952. This claim is historically questionable at best. During the 1950s, Pryor regularly toured in the South. In 1967, Pryor moved to Ullin, Illinois. He quit music and worked as a carpenter in the late 1960s but was persuaded to make a comeback.

In January 1973 he performed alongside Homesick James with the American Blues Legends '73 tour, which played throughout Europe. On this tour they recorded an album in London, Homesick James & Snooky Pryor, for Jim Simpson's label, Big Bear Records, with Pryor also recording a solo album, Shake Your Boogie.

Pryor appeared on Bob Margolin's 1995 Alligator Records release My Blues and My Guitar.

Blues fans later revived interest in his music, and he resumed recording occasionally until his death in nearby Cape Girardeau, Missouri, at the age of 85, or possibly 87.

Some of his better-known songs are "Judgement Day" (1956), "Crazy 'Bout My Baby" (from Snooky, 1989), "Where Did You Learn to Shake It Like That" (from Tenth Anniversary Anthology, 1989), and "Shake My Hand" (1999).

Pryor's son Richard "Rip Lee" Pryor is also a blues musician and performs in and around his hometown of Carbondale, Illinois.

== Discography ==
=== Singles ===
- "Telephone Blues" (A) / Snooky & Moody's "Boogie" (B) (1948), Planet Records; reissued on Old Swing-Master in 1949
- "Boogy Fool" (A) / "Raisin' Sand" (B) (1949), JOB
- "I'm Getting Tired" (A) / "Going Back on the Road" (B) (1952), JOB
- "Crosstown Blues" (A) / "I Want You For Myself" (B) (1953), Parrot
- "Cryin' Shame" (A) / "Eighty Nine Ten" (B) (1954), JOB
- "Someone to Love Me" (A) / "Judgement Day" (B) (1956), Vee-Jay
- "Boogie Twist" (A) / "Uncle Sam Don't Take My Man" (B) (1963), JOB

=== Albums ===
- Snooky Pryor (1970), Flyright Records FLY LP-100
- Homesick James & Snooky Pryor (1973), Virgin Records, London under licence from Big Bear Records, Birmingham
- Do It If You Want To (1973), ABC Records, Los Angeles, New York
- Snooky Pryor and the Country Blues (1973), Today Records
- Shake Your Boogie, (1976), Big Bear Records, Birmingham
- Real Fine Boogie, Snooky Pryor and Moody Jones (1980), Flyright Records
- Snooky (1989), Blind Pig Records
- Back to the Country, Johnny Shines and Snooky Pryor (1991), Blind Pig Records
- Snooky Pryor (1991), Paula Records [compilation of early singles and unissued material]
- Too Cool to Move (1992), Antone's Records
- In This Mess Up to My Chest (1994), Antone's Records
- Mind Your Own Business (1996), Antone's Records
- Shake My Hand (1999), Blind Pig Records
- Double Shot!, Snooky Pryor and Mel Brown (2000), Electro-Fi Records
- Super Harps II, with Carey Bell, Lazy Lester, Raful Neal (2001), Telarc Records
- Snooky Pryor and His Mississippi Wrecking Crew (2002), Electro-Fi Records
- Mojo Ramble (2003), Electro-Fi Records

=== Appears on ===
- American Blues Legends '73 (1973), Big Bear Records

== See also ==
- Chicago Blues Festival
- List of Chicago blues musicians
- List of harmonica blues musicians
- San Francisco Blues Festival
