= Soundstage (TV series) =

American live concert TV series

- Logo
- Country of origin: United States

Production
- Running time: 60 minutes

Original release
- Network: PBS
- Release: 1974 – 1985; 2003 – 2010; 2016 – 2018

Soundstage is an American live concert television series produced by WTTW Chicago and HD Ready. The original series aired for 13 seasons between 1974 and 1985; a new series of seasons began in 2003, with the latest (Season 11) starting in April 2018, each presented in high-definition with surround sound. Some performances have been made available on DVD. The performances are taped on stage at the WTTW television studio in Chicago, as well as large venues throughout the United States.

Airing nationally on PBS, MTV Live, CMT, Rave HD, and GAC, as well as internationally in over 20 countries, the program features intimate performances by well-established as well as up-and-coming artists.

== Initial series ==
The series originated in 1972 as Made in Chicago, and was taped and broadcast by WTTW. It presented a dramatic contrast to the way music had been televised until that point; variety shows (such as The Ed Sullivan Show) and lip-synched cabaret shows (such as The Andy Williams Show) were the norm. Made in Chicago (originated by Ken Ehrlich, who had previously produced The Marty Faye Show) foregrounded the music and emphasized live performance and, at times, improvisation.

In 1974, the show's name was changed to Soundstage, and it became more widely distributed by PBS. Artists who appeared in the early years of the show included figures from rock (Bob Dylan, Tom Waits), pop (the Bee Gees), blues (Bonnie Raitt and Muddy Waters), jazz (Professor Longhair, Dizzy Gillespie, and Benny Goodman, as well as specials dedicated to the Down Beat Readers Poll Award winners), folk (Jim Croce, Janis Ian, Arlo Guthrie, and Harry Chapin), and gospel/soul/R&B (Al Green and Aretha Franklin). The 1980 appearance by John Prine is "the only archival concert of Prine available on DVD". One of the most unusual episodes, broadcast in 1983, was devoted to Andy Kaufman, who hosted it in a (somewhat bizarre) variety show format; it was his last major television appearance.

== Artists ==
=== Original series ===
==== Season 1: 1974 ====
- "Blues Summit in Chicago" with Muddy Waters, Willie Dixon, Koko Taylor, Junior Wells, Pinetop Perkins, Mike Bloomfield, Buddy Miles, Johnny Winter, Dr. John, and Nick Gravenites. Band members: Rollow Radford, Bob Margolin, Willie "Big Eyes" Smith, Calvin "Fuzz" Jones, Luther "Georgia Boy" Johnson, Jerry Portnoy. July 1974
- José Feliciano, 1974
- Randy Newman, 1974
- "The Book of Chapin" with Harry Chapin, 1974
- "Arlo's Gang" with Arlo Guthrie, Steve Goodman and Hoyt Axton with David P. Jackson Jr. and John Pilla. This episode is sometimes referred to as "Arlo and Friends" Nov. 11 1974
- "Yes, We Can Can" with The Pointer Sisters, Dec. 1974
- "Bonnie Raitt & Friends" w/ Buddy Guy and Junior Wells. Dec 14 1974
- "New Jazz" with Return To Forever featuring Chick Corea; Herbie Hancock with The Headhunters; Chick Corea & Herbie Hancock in duet, 1974
- "New Orleans Swamp" with Professor Longhair, Earl King, The Meters, and Dr. John and the Night Trippers, 1974
- "Paradise Club of '58" with Jackie Wilson, Della Reese, George Kirby, and Red Saunders Orchestra, 1974
- John Sebastian, David Bromberg, 1974
- Tom Rush, Tom T. Hall, 1974
- Seals and Crofts with England Dan & John Ford Coley and Walter Heath
- Donovan, Dave Mason, 1974
- Don McLean, The Persuasions, 1974
- Kris Kristofferson, Rita Coolidge, Larry Gatlin, Bill Swan, 1974

==== Season 2: 1975/1976 ====
- "The World of John Hammond, Part One" with hosts Goddard Lieberson, Jerry Wexler, performers Marion Williams, Jessy Nixon, Milt Hinton, Benny Carter, Benny Morton, Red Norvo, George Benson, Teddy Wilson, Jo Jones, Helen Humes, Benny Goodman, Dec. 13
- "The World of John Hammond, Part Two" with hosts Goddard Lieberson, Jerry Wexler, performers Benny Goodman, George Benson, Teddy Wilson, Milt Hinton, Leonard Feather, Sonny Terry, Mitch Miller, John P. Hammond, Bob Dylan, Dec. 14
- Barry Manilow, 1975
- Blood, Sweat & Tears, Janis Ian, 1975
- Tom Waits, Mose Allison Dec. 22
- Three Dog Night
- Waylon Jennings, Jessie Colter, Johnny Rodriguez, 1975
- Bee Gees, Yvonne Elliman, 1975
- "Sixty Minutes to Kill" with Martin Mull and His Fabulous Furniture and Flo & Eddie
- Phil Everly and Dion DiMucci aka "Dion"
- Anne Murray, Dobie Gray, 1975
- "Downbeat Jazz Awards" with Chick Corea, Quincy Jones, George Benson, Stanley Clarke, Freddie Hubbard, Hubert Laws, Bill Watrous, Lenny White, Airto Moreira, Roland Kirk, Sonny Rollins, McCoy Tyner, 1975
- Stan Kenton, The Four Freshmen, Anita O'Day, 1976
- Judy Collins, Leonard Cohen, 1976
- Asleep at the Wheel, Leon Redbone, 1976

==== Season 3: 1976/1977 ====
- Jean-Luc Ponty, Doug Kershaw, and Itzhak Perlman - "Fiddlers Three", 1976
- "Sing Me a Jazz Song" with Jon Hendricks, Annie Ross, Leon Thomas, Eddie Jefferson, 1976
- "Woodie Guthrie's America" with host Studs Terkel, performers Arlo Guthrie, Pete Seeger, Judy Collins, Fred Hellerman, 1976
- The Spinners, 1976
- "Dizzy Gillespie's Bebop Reunion" with Dizzy Gillespie, Al Haig, James Moody, Milt Jackson, Kenny Clarke, Ray Brown, Sarah Vaughan, Joseph Carroll, 1976
- "Downbeat Jazz Awards" with George Benson, Gary Burton, Ron Carter, Stanley Clarke, Billy Cobham, Jean-Luc Ponty, Bill Watrous, Sonny Fortune, Thad Jones, Chick Corea, 1976
- Loudon Wainwright III, 1977
- "An Evening with Jackson Browne", 1977
- B.B. King and Bobby Blue Bland, 1977
- The Charlie Daniels Band, with special guest Leo Kottke, 1977
- "A Santana Festival" with Carlos Santana, Gato Barbieri, Tower of Power, 1977

==== Season 4: 1977/1978 ====
- Kenny Loggins, Jesse Winchester, Michael Murphey, Live at Red Rocks, 1977
- Burton Cummings and Randy Bachman, 1977
- Hank Williams Jr., Vassar Clements, Katy Moffatt, 1977
- Phoebe Snow, David Bromberg, 1977
- Graham Parker and The Rumour, Rick Danko, 1977
- The Doobie Brothers
- "Dave Brubeck and Sons", Darius Brubeck, Chris Brubeck, Dan Brubeck, The Murray Louis Dance Company, 1977
- "David Amram and Friends", Dizzy Gillespie, Steve Goodman, Jethro Burns, Bonnie Koloc, Chicago Symphony Orchestra, 1978
- Al Green, 1978
- The Crusaders, Roy Ayers, Ubiquity Starbooty, 1978
- Peter Allen, Patti LaBelle, 1978
- "The World of Proctor and Bergman", Philip Proctor, Peter Bergman, Hirth Martinez, 1978

==== Season 5: 1978/1979 ====
- Leo Sayer, 1978
- Emmylou Harris, Buck White, The Hot Band, The Whites 1978
- Journey, with Albert King, Luther Allison, Pinetop Perkins, Jerry Portnoy, 7/9/1978
- Pablo Cruise, 1978
- Ry Cooder, with The Golden Gate Quartet, 1978
- "Fifth Anniversary Show" with host Harry Chapin, 1978
- "George Benson, Chet Atkins and Earl Klugh" 1978
- Garland Jeffreys, Carmen McRae, Sonny Rollins, 1979
- "Shel Silverstein and Dr. Hook"
- Freddy Fender, Doug Sahm, Huey Meaux, LeBlanc and Carr, 1979
- Bruce Roberts, with guests Alice Cooper, Bernie Taupin, 1979
- Eddie Rabbit, Bobby Bare, 1979

==== Season 6: 1979/1980 ====
- Gordon Lightfoot 1979
- The Temptations, 1979
- The Doobie Brothers, 1979
- "Chick Corea and Al Jarreau", with Gary Burton, Gayle Moran, Bunny Brunel, Tom Brechtlein, 1979
- Ella Fitzgerald, with Count Basie, Joe Pass, Roy Eldridge, Zoot Sims, Paul Smith, Keter Betts, Mickey Roker, 1979
- Elvin Bishop, with Mighty Joe Young, Son Seals, 1979
- Joan Armatrading 1979
- "Sixth Anniversary Show", 1979
- John Prine, 1980
- Rupert Holmes, 1980
- Southside Johnny and The Asbury Jukes, with Junior Wells, 1980
- "Tom Johnston (Doobie Brother)" 1978, 1980
- Johnny Paycheck, Mickey Gilley, 1980

==== Season 7: 1980/1981 ====
- "An Evening with Dionne Warwick", 1980
- Victor Borge - "Comedy in Music", 1980
- The Manhattan Transfer, 1980
- Little River Band, 1980
- Don Williams, 1981
- Lacy J. Dalton and Con Hunley, 1981
- "Just Folk" with Odetta, Tom Paxton, Bob Gibson, Josh White Jr., 1981
- "An Evening with Roberta Flack" with guest Dwight Watkins, 1981
- The Oak Ridge Boys, 1981

==== Season 8: 1981/1982 ====
- Chicago Jazz Festival, with Herbie Hancock, Carmen McRae, Sun Ra and His Arkestra, 1981
- Doc Severinsen and Xebron, with Gus Giordano Jazz Dance Chicago, 1981
- Cheap Trick at ChicagoFest, 1981
- Roger Miller, 1982
- The Blasters, with Carl Perkins, Willie Dixon, 1982
- Ronnie Milsap, 1982
- "Full Swing" with Charlotte Crosley, Lorraine Feather, Steve March, 1982
- The Marshall Tucker Band, Micheal Smotherman, 1982
- "Doo Wop!" with The Capris, The Harptones, The Jive Five, The Mystics, Randy & The Rainbows, 1982
- Etta James, with Dr. John, Allen Toussaint, 1982

==== Season 9: 1983 ====
- Loverboy, 1983
- The Roches, 1983
- Tina Turner, 1983
- Joe Cocker, 1983
- V.S.O.P., with Herbie Hancock, Wynton Marsalis, Branford Marsalis, 1983
- Peabo Bryson and Angela Bofill, 1983
- Marshall Crenshaw, 1983
- "The Andy Kaufman Show", 1983
- "The Chicago Bluegrass Festival" with John McEuen, Jimmy Ibbotson, Doc Watson, Merle Watson, Peter Rowan, David Bromberg, 1983
- Greg Kihn, 1983

==== Season 10: 1985 ====
- Chicago Jazz Festival with The Buddy Rich Big Band, Bud Freeman Sextet, Doc Cheatham, A Tribute to Count Basie, with Clark Terry, Buddy DeFranco, Gus Johnson, Charlie Rouse, Nat Pierce, Milton Hinton, 1985
- Chicago Jazz Festival, A Tribute to Charlie Parker, with Lou Donaldson, James Moody, Ira Sullivan, Duke Jordan, Mongo Santamaria, 1985
- Aretha Franklin, 1985
- "Tenth Anniversary Special" with host Dionne Warwick, 1985

=== New series ===
==== Season 1: 2003 ====
- Lyle Lovett, Randy Newman, and Mark Isham, March 2003
- Chicago, live in concert, June 2003
- Michael McDonald, July 2003
- Alison Krauss and Union Station, July 2003
- Tom Petty and the Heartbreakers, July 2003
- Lucinda Williams and Kasey Chambers, July 2003
- Chris Isaak and Raul Malo, August 2003
- Trace Adkins and Travis Tritt, August 2003
- Tori Amos, August 2003 Taped May 2, 2003
- Wilco and Sonic Youth, September 2003
- John Hiatt and the Goners, Dar Williams, Robinella and the CCString Band, September 2003
- Peter Cetera and Amy Grant, October 2003
- Farm Aid 2003 at Germain Amphitheater, Columbus, Ohio, featuring Willie Nelson, Neil Young and Crazy Horse, John Mellencamp, Dave Matthews, Sheryl Crow, Brooks & Dunn, Emmylou Harris, Los Lonely Boys, Hootie & the Blowfish, Billy Bob Thornton and Trick Pony, November 2003

==== Season 2: 2004 ====
- Fleetwood Mac at the FleetCenter in West End Boston, June 2004 taped September 24, 2003
- Sheryl Crow, June 2004
- Ronald Isley and Burt Bacharach, July 2004
- Alanis Morissette, July 2004
- Lisa Marie Presley and Peter Wolf, July 2004
- Cyndi Lauper, August 2004
- Joan Baez, Gillian Welch, and Nickel Creek, August 2004
- Counting Crows and Shelby Lynne, August 2004
- Dan Fogelberg, September 2004
- Steve Winwood, September 2004
- 30 Odd Foot of Grunts and Kris Kristofferson, September 2004
- Yes at Tsongas Arena, Lowell, Massachusetts, Taped May 15, 2004. Premiered September 2004
- Chris Isaak Christmas album Special, with guests Michael Bublé, Brian McKnight and Stevie Nicks, Taped September 23–24, 2004 Premiered December 2, 2004

==== Season 3: 2005 ====
- Michael McDonald with guests Billy Preston, Toni Braxton, Take 6 and India.Arie in Tennessee, June 2005
- John Mayer with Buddy Guy, July 2005
- The Wallflowers, July 2005
- Heart, July 2005
- America with guest Christopher Cross, August 2005
- Ringo Starr & the Roundheads with guest Colin Hay at Genesee Theatre, Waukegan, Illinois, August 2005
- Lindsey Buckingham with Stevie Nicks, September 2005
- Chris Isaak, September 2005
- Trisha Yearwood with guests Billy Currington and Sugarland, September 2005
- Joss Stone with guest Mavis Staples, October 2005
- Martina McBride at Genesee Theatre, Waukegan, Illinois, October 2005
- Dave Matthews Band with guests Robert Randolph, Rashawn Ross and David Cast at Red Rocks Amphitheatre, November 2005

==== Season 4: 2006–2007 ====
- Robert Plant and the Strange Sensation, June 2006
- Garbage, July 2006
- Bill Laswell, AXIOM SOUND SYSTEM, and Musical Freezone featuring Tabla Beat Science, Pharoah Sanders backed by Material, and two Praxis members Buckethead and Bootsy Collins, July 2006
- The All American Rejects and Fountains of Wayne, July 2006
- KT Tunstall, July 2006
- Train, August
- Tom Petty Live from Gainesville 30th Anniversary Concert, November 2006
- Peter Frampton, January 2007
- New York Dolls, February 2007
- Lee Ann Womack with Julie Roberts, February 2007
- Jewel at Meyerson Symphony Center, Dallas, February 2007
- Rickie Lee Jones, February 2007
- Mark Knopfler and Emmylou Harris at Gibson Amphitheatre, Los Angeles, March 2007

==== Season 5: 2007 ====
- Rob Thomas, January 2007
- NY Dolls, February 2007
- Rickie Lee Jones, February 2007
- Mark Knoffler & EmmyLou Harris, February 2007
- Rob Thomas at Red Rocks Amphitheatre, June 2007
- Macy Gray, July 2007
- Dashboard Confessional at Madison Square Garden, July 2007
- Jewel at Rialto Square Theatre, Joliet, Illinois, July 2007 Taped November 28, 2006
- George Jones 50 Years Special, with guests Alan Jackson, Kenny Chesney, Wynonna, Martina McBride, Aaron Neville, Harry Connick Jr., Randy Travis, Lorrie Morgan, Vince Gill, Trick Pony, Amy Grant, Sammy Kershaw, Trace Adkins, Uncle Kracker, Connie Smith, Emmylou Harris, Joe Diffie, Kris Kristofferson, Shelby Lynne and Tanya Tucker, November 2007

==== Season 6: 2008 ====
- Tom Petty and the Heartbreakers, January 2008
- Lifehouse, January 2008
- Daughtry, January 2008
- John Fogerty, February 2008
- Josh Groban at EnergySolutions Arena, Salt Lake City, June 2008 taped August 28, 2007
- REO Speedwagon, July 2008
- Bon Jovi, July 2008
- Stevie Nicks, July 2008
- Matchbox Twenty, July 2008
- Kenny Chesney, August 2008
- Faith Hill, Joy to the World, A Soundstage Special Event at Sears Centre Arena, November 2008 Taped September 10, 2008

==== Season 7: 2009 ====
- Counting Crows, Saturday Nights & Sunday Mornings, January 2009
- Idina Menzel with special guests Josh Groban and Ravi Coltrane at Rose Hall at Jazz at Lincoln Center, New York, January 2009
- Foreigner, January 2009
- B.B. King with special guests Terrence Howard, Richie Sambora, and Solange Knowles, January 2009
- Umphrey's McGee, February 2009
- Seal, February 2009
- Jackson Browne, June 2009
- OneRepublic, June 2009
- Sugarland, July 2009
- Death Cab for Cutie, July 2009
- Billy Idol at the Congress Theater, July 2009
- Fall Out Boy, July 2009
- Josh Groban: An Evening in New York City, July 2009
- Michael McDonald: This Christmas

==== Season 8: 2010 ====
- Tim McGraw, January 2010
- The Fray, January 2010
- 3 Girls and Their Buddy featuring Emmylou Harris, Patty Griffin, Shawn Colvin and Buddy Miller, January 2010 Taped October 29, 2009
- Lynyrd Skynyrd, January 2010
- Willie Nelson, January 2010

==== Season 9: 2016 ====
- Toby Keith, April 2016
- GeorgeFest, celebrating the music of George Harrison featuring performances by Brian Wilson, Norah Jones, Dhani Harrison, Ann Wilson of Heart, and more. May 2016
- Jason Isbell, May 2016
- Jake Owen, May 2016
- Kenny Loggins, August 2016
- Regina Spektor, October 2016

==== Season 10: 2017 ====
- Bad Company, January 2017
- Jon Secada, January 2017
- Blondie, January 2017
- Old Dominion, February 2017
- Tom Jones, March 2017

==== Season 11: 2018 ====
- Chicago, April 2018
- Katharine McPhee, April 2018
- The Manhattan Transfer/Take 6, April 2018
- Michael McDonald, April 2018
- RSO (Richie Sambora and Orianthi), May 2018
