= Muddy "Mississippi" Waters – Live =

Live album by Muddy Waters
- Released: January 1979
- Recorded: March 18, 1977 – August 26, 1978
- Venue: Harry Hope's, Cary, IL; Masonic Auditorium, Detroit, MI
- Genre: Electric blues
- Length: 39:38
- Label: Blue Sky
- Producer: Johnny Winter

Muddy Waters chronology
I'm Ready (1978)	Muddy "Mississippi" Waters – Live (1979)	King Bee (1981)

Muddy "Mississippi" Waters – Live is a live album by Muddy Waters, released in January 1979. It was recorded during the 1977–78 tour to support Muddy Waters' album Hard Again (1977) and features the same musicians, including James Cotton and Johnny Winter, who had produced the album.

== Critical reception ==
Professional ratings
Review scores
Source	Rating
AllMusic	2/5 stars
Christgau's Record Guide	B+
The Penguin Guide to Blues Recordings	3/4 stars

Village Voice critic Robert Christgau wrote: "Age cannot wither nor Johnny Winter whelm the elan of this boyish man. It may not last forever, though—he really seems to mean 'Deep Down in Florida.' Sun shines every day, you can play in the sand with your wife, and maybe work on a slow one called 'Condominium Blues' in your spare time."

== Track listing ==
All tracks composed by McKinley Morganfield (Muddy Waters), except where indicated

1. "Mannish Boy" (Morganfield, Ellas McDaniel, Mel London) (4:24)
2. "She’s Nineteen Years Old" (5:21)
3. "Nine Below Zero" (Sonny Boy Williamson) (5:21)
4. "Streamline Woman" (4:39)
5. "Howling Wolf" (6:00)
6. "Baby Please Don’t Go" (4:07)
7. "Deep Down in Florida" (9:48)

In 2003 the album was reissued as a two-CD set; the second disc contained 11 previously unreleased performances recorded during shows on August 25 and 26, 1978, at Harry Hope's in Cary, IL:

1. "Medley: After Hours/Stormy Monday Blues" (Avery Parrish, Buddy Feyne, Robert Bruce, Aaron "T-Bone" Walker) (12:00)
2. "Trouble No More" (2:49)
3. "Champagne and Reefer" (4:52)
4. "Corrina, Corrina" (2:49)
5. "Hoochie Coochie Man" (Willie Dixon) (3:10)
6. "She Moves Me" (6:19)
7. "Kansas City" (Jerry Leiber, Mike Stoller) (9:30)
8. "Pinetop's Boogie Woogie" (C. "Pinetop" Smith) (4:59)
9. "Mad Love" (I Want You To Love Me) (Willie Dixon) (4:16)
10. "Everything's Gonna Be Alright" (Walter Jacobs) (5:21)
11. "Got My Mojo Working" (Preston Foster) (3:13)

In 2007 a third album from the same tour, Breakin' It Up, Breakin' It Down, was released. It features material from three concerts (March 4 at the Palladium in New York City, March 6 at the Tower Theater in Upper Darby, Pennsylvania, and March 18 at the Masonic Temple Theater in Detroit) where Muddy Waters performed along with James Cotton and Johnny Winter.

== Personnel ==
- Muddy Waters – slide guitar, vocals
- Johnny Winter – guitar (songs 1, 5, 7), additional vocals (song 1), production
- Bob Margolin – guitar
- Luther "Guitar Junior" Johnson – guitar (songs 1, 2, 4, 6)
- Calvin "Fuzz" Jones – bass (songs 1, 2, 4–6)
- Charles Calmese – bass (songs 3, 7)
- Pinetop Perkins – piano
- Jerry Portnoy – harmonica (songs 1, 2, 4, 6)
- James Cotton – harmonica (songs 3, 5)
- Willie "Big Eyes" Smith – drums

Production staff

- Producer: Johnny Winter
- Mixing, production consultant and engineer: Dave Still
- Mixing assistant: Dave Prentice
- Mastering: Greg Calbi
- Photography: Jim Marshall
- Design: Paula Scher
- Mixed at the Schoolhouse and Hit Factory
- Location recordings by Metro Audio and Record Plant
