= Folk Singer (album) =

Studio album by Muddy Waters
- Released: January 30, 1964
- Recorded: September 1963
- Studios: Tel Mar Recording, Chicago, Illinois
- Genre: Blues
- Length: 34:22
- Label: Chess
- Producers: Ralph Bass, Willie Dixon

Muddy Waters chronology
At Newport 1960 (1960)	Folk Singer (1964)	The Real Folk Blues (1966)

Folk Singer is the second studio album and fourth album overall by Muddy Waters, released in January 1964 by Chess Records. The album features Waters on acoustic guitar, backed by Willie Dixon on string bass, Clifton James on drums, and Buddy Guy on acoustic guitar. It is Waters's only all-acoustic album. Numerous reissues of Folk Singer include bonus tracks from two subsequent sessions, in April 1964 and October 1964.

Despite not charting in any country, Folk Singer received critical acclaim; most reviewers praised its high-quality sound, especially on remastered versions, as well as the instrumentation. In 2003, the album was ranked number 280 on Rolling Stone's list of "The 500 Greatest Albums of All Time".

== Background ==
After his successful performance at Newport Jazz Festival and tours through America, Chess Records encouraged Waters to record songs for a new studio album. Before the recording, several musicians had left Waters's band, and others had joined Waters. Andrew Stephens, who played at Newport, was replaced in the following years with numerous bassists. The drummer Francis Clay was replaced by Willie "Big Eyes" Smith, who played in the Muddy Waters Junior Band. Pat Hare was sentenced to life in prison for the murder of his wife (while in jail, he formed the band Sounds Incarcerated). Hare was replaced by a succession of guitarists, including James "Pee Wee" Madison, who played a right-handed guitar left-handed. Madison played guitar on some of the reissue bonus tracks, as did Sammy Lawhorn. Lawhorn allegedly suffered from narcolepsy (Elvin Bishop denied this, believing that Lawhorn's sleepiness was due to alcoholism). The electric guitarist Buddy Guy, who had recorded with Waters on Blues from Big Bill's Copacabana, released by Chess in 1963, was hired. Guy had been discovered by Waters shortly after Guy arrived in Chicago from Louisiana.

== Recording ==
Folk Singer is an "unplugged" recording and differs from his earlier albums, which featured an electric blues sound. The title of the album was chosen by Chess Records because it was recorded during the time when folk music was popular. In order to appeal to fans of folk music, Chess recorded a more acoustic album with two acoustic guitarists. Buddy Guy was hired as the second guitarist. Other guitarists played on bonus tracks. Guy played on all original songs, except the last song, "Feel Like Going Home", together with Waters.

The recording took place at the Ter Mar Recording Studios, in Chicago, in September 1963, and was produced by Willie Dixon. The original vinyl release includes nine songs, most of which are performed at a slower tempo, with the exception of the uptempo "Good Morning Little Schoolgirl". During recording, Waters emphasized his singing with hums and sighs.

== Releases and tour ==
The original album was released as an LP January 30, 1964 by Chess Records. Since then, numerous record labels have released different versions on CD, with different bonus tracks from Waters's 1964 sessions. One of the first CD versions was released in 1993 by Mobile Fidelity Sound Lab, containing two bonus tracks, "You Can't Lose What You Never Had" and "The Same Thing." The 1999 remastered version contains five bonus tracks, "The Same Thing", "You Can't Lose What You Never Had", "My John the Conqueror Root", "Short Dress Woman" and "Put Me In Your Lay Away".

The supporting tour through Europe, the second American Folk Blues Festival, began one month after the recording of Folk Singer. The first gig out of seventeen took place in London; other performances were in Belgium, Germany, France and Denmark. In London, Waters began with the unreleased "My Captain", followed by "Rollin' Stone". In keeping with the folk theme, quiet versions of "Five Long Years", "Blow Wind Blow", "Trouble No More", "My Home Is in the Delta" and "Got My Mojo Working" were performed.

== Critical reception ==
Professional ratings
Review scores
Source	Rating
AllMusic	4.5/5 stars
DownBeat	2.5/5 stars
The Encyclopedia of Popular Music	4/5 stars
MusicHound Blues	3.5/5 stars
The Penguin Guide to Blues Recordings	2.5/4 stars
Q	4/5 stars
Record Mirror	3/5 stars
The Rolling Stone Album Guide	4/5 stars

Reviewing the LP in 1964, DownBeat found Waters's singing "forced and artificial", and said Folk Singer suffers from a major flaw: "He only begins to come close to the power and unforced intensity of the original numbers and style from time to time, as on 'You Gonna Need My Help' and 'My Home Is in the Delta'". In a retrospective review, Cub Koda, writing for AllMusic was more enthusiastic, deeming the record's sound fresh and vital. Reviewing its 1993 CD reissue, Rolling Stone wrote, "...There aren't too many blues albums that qualify as audiophile recordings, but Muddy Waters Folk Singer surely does. A wonderfully intimate session, it delivers Waters' voice in all its power and subtlety, while rendering his guitar work...with such vivid realism, you would think you were sitting in the studio...." Village Voice critic Robert Christgau found the remaster "luxurious and intimate", and the reissue in general "worthy addenda" to Waters' discography.

In 2003, Rolling Stone ranked Folk Singer number 280 on its list of the "500 Greatest Albums of All Time", writing that the "unplugged" playing was pioneering and has since been "beloved by blues and folk fans alike". The ranking was updated to 282 in a 2012 revised list.

== Track listing ==
Side one
No.	Title	Writer(s)	Length
1.	"My Home Is in the Delta"	Waters	3:58
2.	"Long Distance"	Waters	3:30
3.	"My Captain"	Willie Dixon	5:10
4.	"Good Morning Little Schoolgirl"	Sonny Boy Williamson	3:12
5.	"You Gonna Need My Help"	Waters	3:09
Total length:			18:59

Side two
No.	Title	Writer(s)	Length
1.	"Cold Weather Blues"	Waters	4:40
2.	"Big Leg Woman"	John Temple	3:25
3.	"Country Boy"	Waters	3:26
4.	"Feel Like Going Home"	Waters	3:52
Total length:			15:23

1993 bonus tracks
No.	Title	Writer(s)	Length
10.	"You Can't Lose What You Ain't Never Had"	Waters	2:57
11.	"The Same Thing"	Dixon	2:46
Total length:			40:05

1999 bonus tracks
No.	Title	Writer(s)	Length
10.	"The Same Thing"	Dixon	2:46
11.	"You Can't Lose What You Never Had"	Waters	2:57
12.	"My John the Conqueror Root"	Dixon	2:22
13.	"Short Dress Woman"	John T. Brown	2:49
14.	"Put Me in Your Lay Away"	L.J. Welch	2:56
Total length:			48:12

== Personnel ==
Credits are adapted from AllMusic.

Musicians

- Muddy Waters – guitar, vocals
- Buddy Guy – guitar
- Sammy Lawhorn – guitar
- James Madison – guitar
- Otis Spann – harmonica, piano
- Francis Clay – drums
- Clifton James – drums
- S.P. Leary – drums
- Willie Dixon – bass
- Milton Rector – bass
- J.T. Brown – clarinet, tenor saxophone

Production

- Willie Dixon – producer
- Ralph Bass – producer
- Ron Malo – engineer
- Vartan – art direction, reissue art director
- Bob Schnieders – coordinator, liner notes
- Mary Katherine Aldin – liner notes
- Don Bronstein – cover design, photography
- Jim Marshall – photography
- Beth Stempel – reissue producer, reissue production coordination (remastered version)
- Andy McKaie – reissue producer (remastered version)
- Erick Labson – digital remastering, mastering, mixing (remastered version)
- Johnny Lee – reissue design (remastered version)
- Meire Murakami – reissue design (remastered version)
