= Sammy Lawhorn =

American Chicago blues guitarist

- Born: Samuel David Lawhorn; July 12, 1935; Little Rock, Arkansas, United States
- Died: April 29, 1990 (aged 54) Chicago, Illinois, United States
- Genres: Chicago blues
- Occupation: Guitarist
- Instrument: Guitar
- Years active: 1950s–1990
- Labels: Various

Sammy David Lawhorn (July 12, 1935 – April 29, 1990) was an American Chicago blues guitarist, best known as a member of Muddy Waters's band. He also accompanied many other blues musicians, including Otis Spann, Willie Cobbs, Eddie Boyd, Roy Brown, Big Mama Thornton, John Lee Hooker, James Cotton and Junior Wells.

== Biography ==
Lawhorn was born in Little Rock, Arkansas. His parents soon separated, and his mother remarried, leaving him in the care of his grandparents. He made his own diddley bow, nailing baling twine to the side of their house. He frequently visited his mother and stepfather in Chicago. They bought him a ukulele, then an acoustic guitar and finally an electric guitar. By the age of fifteen, he was proficient enough to accompany Driftin' Slim on stage. With further guidance from Sonny Boy Williamson II, Lawhorn began playing with him on the radio program King Biscuit Time.

He was conscripted in 1953 and served in the United States Navy. On a tour of duty in Korea, he was injured by enemy fire during aerial reconnaissance. He remained in the Navy until his discharge in 1958. He then moved to Memphis, Tennessee, where he played on recordings with the "5" Royales, Eddie Boyd, Roy Brown and Willie Cobbs. An argument with Cobbs arose over the writing credits for the song "You Don't Love Me". Finding work on his own in Chicago in 1958, Lawhorn soon moved there, despite the theft of a guitar at one of his early club performances.

By the early 1960s, Lawhorn had found regular work as a club sideman to Junior Wells, Otis Rush and Elmore James and sat in with Muddy Waters's band on a couple of occasions. By October 1964, he had been invited to become a full-time member of Waters's band. Over the next decade, he played on several of Waters's albums, including Folk Singer, Live at Mr. Kelly's and The London Muddy Waters Sessions. His guitar playing was also featured when the band supplied backing for John Lee Hooker, Big Mama Thornton and Otis Spann. Citing Lawhorn's use of the tremolo arm on his guitar and his overall playing expertise, Waters later referred to him as the best guitarist he ever had in his band.

However, Lawhorn's career was beginning to be hampered by his drinking. He passed out on stage over his amplifier and off stage while sitting in clubs, and he missed some shows altogether. Waters lost patience and fired him in 1973. He was replaced by Bob Margolin.

Lawhorn returned to playing in Chicago clubs and remained in the recording industry, contributing to Junior Wells's On Tap (1974) and James Cotton's Take Me Back (1987). He also played guitar on recorded work by Koko Taylor, Jimmy Witherspoon, Little Mack Simmons, and L. C. Robinson. Working in several Chicago haunts, he played alongside his childhood idols T-Bone Walker and Lightnin' Hopkins. He offered assistance to up-and-coming musicians, including John Primer, who became his disciple.

Lawhorn's health began to fail as a result of alcoholism and arthritis. A factor contributing to his arthritis was his having broken bones in his feet and ankles when he was thrown from a third-floor window by a burglar.

He died on April 29, 1990, at the age of 54. His death certificate cited death by natural causes. In 2016 the Killer Blues Project placed a headstone for Sammy Lawhorn at Restvale Cemetery in Alsip, Illinois.

== Discography ==
With James Cotton

- Take Me Back (Blind Pig, 1987)

With Johnny Dollar

- My Soul Is Blue (Isabel, 1980)

With Muddy Waters

- Folk Singer (Chess, 1964)
- The Real Folk Blues (Chess, 1947–64, [1966])
- Muddy, Brass & the Blues (Chess, 1966)
- Live at Mr. Kelly's (Chess, 1971)
- The London Muddy Waters Sessions (Chess, 1972)
- Can't Get No Grindin', Muddy Waters, (Chess, 1973)

With Otis Spann

- The Blues Is Where It's At (BluesWay, 1966)
- The Bottom of the Blues (BluesWay, 1968)

With John Lee Hooker

- Live at Cafe Au Go Go (BluesWay, 1966)

With Koko Taylor

- I Got What It Takes (Alligator, 1975)

With Big Mama Thornton

- Big Mama Thornton with Muddy Waters' Blues Band (Arhoolie, 1966)

With Junior Wells

- On Tap (Delmark, 1974)
- Live at Theresa's 1975 (Delmark, 1975 [2006])

With Jimmy Witherspoon

- Spoon's Life (Isabel, 1980)

== See also ==
- List of Chicago blues musicians
