= Breakin' It Up, Breakin' It Down =

Live album by Muddy Waters, Johnny Winter, James Cotton
- Released: June 5, 2007
- Recorded: March 4–18, 1977
- Genre: Blues
- Length: 59:24
- Label: Epic
- Producer: Bob Margolin

Breakin' It Up, Breakin' It Down is a blues album by Muddy Waters, Johnny Winter, and James Cotton. It was recorded live in 1977, and released in 2007. It reached number 3 on the Billboard Blues Albums chart.

== Production ==
In January 1977, blues guitarist and singer Muddy Waters released the studio album Hard Again. It was very well-received, and helped revive Waters' career. It won a Grammy Award for Best Ethnic or Traditional Folk Recording. Hard Again was produced by Johnny Winter. Winter and James Cotton both played on the album, on guitar and harmonica respectively.

In March 1977, Waters, Winter, Cotton, and the other musicians who had played on Hard Again went on a concert tour to promote it. The songs on Breakin' It Up, Breakin' It Down were recorded at three of those concerts – March 4 at the Palladium in New York City, March 6 at the Tower Theater in Upper Darby, Pennsylvania, and March 18 at the Masonic Temple Theater in Detroit. The concert tapes languished in the vaults of several different record companies, until they were released thirty years later.

In August 1977, Winter released a studio album recorded by the same group of musicians, titled Nothin' but the Blues.

== Critical reception ==
On AllMusic, Richie Unterberger said, "It might have been spurred by a Muddy Waters album, but in fact Waters, Winter, and Cotton all took vocals – sometimes alone, and sometimes on the same song – on stage, and these 11 songs feature the vocals of each of the three in about equal measure.... It's undeniable, however, that Waters was, even at this relatively advanced age, by far the most commanding singer of the trio."

In All About Jazz, Doug Collette wrote, "Waters, Winter and Cotton share the music as well as the stage – a crucial distinction in the dynamics that radiate from "How Long Can a Fool Go Wrong". There is familiar material here, including "Can't Be Satisfied" – Waters' signature tune and first hit – "Trouble No More", and the rousing (albeit somewhat predictable) encore, "Got My Mojo Workin'". There's a palpable sense that these songs are not only finding a new audience, but being rediscovered by the musicians, hence the reciprocal excitement builds through the sequencing of tracks."

In Vintage Guitar, Dan Forte said, "Not a dull moment is to be found, as Muddy reprises his first hit, "Can't Be Satisfied", and shares vocals with Perkins on "Caledonia"; Winter serves up the Freddie King slow blues "Love Her with a Feeling" and J.B. Lenoir's bopping "Mama, Talk to Your Daughter"; and Cotton fires up "Rocket 88" and mines the deepest of all shuffles on "How Long Can a Fool Go Wrong".

On Blinded by Sound, Josh Hathaway said, ""Caledonia" is one of the high points on this set and best examples of what Waters' presence means to a song. His performance is vital and magnetic and his interplay with Cotton and Pinetop is priceless!... Blues lovers will – and should – flock to this disc. It's not Waters at his best yet it reinforces just what a towering figure he is in the history of the blues and popular music."

== Track listing ==
1. "Black Cat Bone" / "Dust My Broom" (Johnny Winter / Elmore James, Robert Johnson) – 5:53
2. "Can't Be Satisfied" (Muddy Waters) – 3:48
3. "Caledonia" (Fleecy Moore) – 6:38
4. "Dealin' with the Devil" (James Cotton) – 7:50
5. "Rocket 88" (Jackie Brenston) – 2:09
6. "I Done Got Over It" (Guitar Slim) – 6:00
7. "How Long Can a Fool Go Wrong" (Cotton) – 5:54
8. "Mama Talk to Your Daughter" (J. B. Lenoir, Alex Atkins) – 5:54
9. "Love Her with a Feeling" (Lowell Fulson) – 5:47
10. "Trouble No More" (Waters) – 4:10
11. "Got My Mojo Workin'" (Waters, Preston Foster) – 4:59

== Personnel ==
Musicians

- Muddy Waters – guitar, vocals
- Johnny Winter – guitar, vocals
- Bob Margolin – guitar, vocals
- Charles Calmese – bass guitar
- Pinetop Perkins – piano, vocals
- James Cotton – harmonica, vocals
- Willie "Big Eyes" Smith – drums

Production

- Produced by Bob Margolin
- Co-producers: Steve Berkowitz, Al Quaglieri
- Recording: Dave Still
- Mixing: Mark Williams
- Mastering: Joseph M. Palmaccio
- Art direction: Howard Fritzon
- Design: Smay Vision
