= Benny Kay =

American film producer

Benny Kay is an American recording artist and award-winning producer who has been creating music for over thirty years. Kay began his career in music by playing blues and barrelhouse piano at coffeehouses in the Boston, Massachusetts area. He became known for recording a risque version of Louis Armstrong's "Cheesecake", and appeared several times on the Joel "Fats" Rogers Show on WBCN in Boston. Kay recorded his first album for the Aladdin Records label, at the age of eighteen, serving as piano player for the seven-piece rhythm and blues band, Powerhouse. Among the highlights of the initial and subsequent Powerhouse releases are guest performances by Bull Moose Jackson and guitarist J. Geils. Over several years of regional touring with Powerhouse, Kay performed with or opened for Bonnie Raitt, Muddy Waters, James Cotton, Big Walter Horton, J. B. Hutto, John Lee Hooker, Frank Zappa, Captain Beefheart, Blood Sweat & Tears, NRBQ, Bob Margolin, Janis Ian, The Nighthawks and many others.

Kay moved to New York in 1985 to produce music for the successful television program You Magazine and fashion videos for Liz Claiborne, Anne Klein and others.

Blue Whispers marked Kay's debut as a solo release of romantic ballads and included accompaniment by the bassist Ray Brown, drummer Grady Tate, Jr. and keyboardist Carlton Holmes. Five of the tracks from Blue Whispers were added to rotation on CHFI-FM, Canada's largest FM radio station, along with Frank Sinatra's Duets album. Russ Davis, at WQCD first drew attention to Blue Whispers in the U.S. by airing an advance copy of several cuts prior to the release. Twenty-two FM stations followed in the United States and broadcast Blue Whispers in rotation for over nine months.

In 1997, Kay produced the international collaboration between Russian recording artist Boris Grebenshchikov and members of The Band, including original members Garth Hudson, Rick Danko and later members Jim Weider and Randy Carlianti. The resulting release was the Lilith album.

Kay has been actively involved in the production of various media projects throughout his career. Kay was executive producer of the independent film Hero which won the silver award at the U.S. Film Festival in 1984. He has received numerous notices in the press and CNN highlighted one of his events in their summation of noteworthy events of the 1980s.
