= At Newport 1960 =

Live album by Muddy Waters
- Released: November 15, 1960
- Recorded: July 3, 1960
- Venue: Newport Jazz Festival
- Genre: Chicago blues
- Length: 32:38
- Label: Chess
- Producer: Leonard Chess

Muddy Waters chronology
Muddy Waters Sings "Big Bill" (1960)	At Newport 1960 (1960)	Folk Singer (1964)

At Newport 1960 is a live album by Muddy Waters recorded during his performance at the Newport Jazz Festival on July 3, 1960. With his longtime backup band, Muddy Waters plays a mix of his older popular tunes and some newer compositions. Chess Records released the album in the United States on November 15, 1960.

At Newport 1960 is sometimes referred to as the first live blues album and has received critical acclaim. Rolling Stone included it at number 348 on its list of "500 Greatest Albums of all Time". Along with the songs on The Best of Muddy Waters (1958), the album was an important influence on the emerging younger white blues scenes in the U.S. and U.K.

== Background ==
Muddy Waters was one of the most popular blues artists of the 1950s. Beginning in 1948, he had fifteen singles that appeared on the Billboard Rhythm & Blues Records chart. His debut album, The Best of Muddy Waters (1958), contained twelve of his hits. However, by 1960, what had been the traditional blues audiences were moving away from Chicago-style blues towards the more polished R&B and soul sounds. Chess released Sings Big Bill Broonzy (1960), a collection of Muddy Waters' interpretations of songs by the blues musician Big Bill Broonzy. When he performed at the Newport Jazz Festival, his electric blues band consisted of Otis Spann (piano, vocals), Pat Hare (guitar), James Cotton (harmonica), Andrew Stevens (bass) and Francis Clay (drums).

== Recording ==
The gig was scheduled for Sunday afternoon, July 3. The day before, performances by Ray Charles and singing group Lambert, Hendricks & Ross were met with unruly crowds. About 300 drunken revelers made a commotion during Charles' performance and the police responded with tear gas and water hoses. The riots became so out of control that the National Guard was called in at midnight to calm the crowd. When Waters and his band arrived on the scheduled day, they intended to drive back on the next day, until driver James Cotton saw John Lee Hooker standing at a corner, his guitar on his back without a guitar case. Cotton said Hooker should get into his car to get the musicians out of harm's way. At the same time, the city council decided to cancel the concert, but concert promoter George Wein convinced the performers to stay when he said that the United States Information Agency (USIA) planned to film the festival to teach American culture in other countries.

Before Waters' performance, his band backed Otis Spann, who was the band leader, and John Lee Hooker. At about 7 p.m., Muddy Waters entered the stage, wearing black, while the rest of the band wore white suits. At Newport 1960 opens with then-unreleased "I Got My Brand on You", which was recorded one month prior, and "(I'm Your) Hoochie Coochie Man", both written by Willie Dixon. Next are the Big Joe Williams cover "Baby, Please Don't Go", Oden's "Soon Forgotten", Dixon's "Tiger in Your Tank" and Broonzy's "I Feel So Good". At the end of "I've Got My Mojo Working", every bluesman gathered at the stage to perform medleys of blues standards. Jazz poet and directorate of Newport Langston Hughes spontaneously wrote a closing song, the slow "Goodbye Newport Blues", this time with Spann as singer, as Waters was too exhausted to perform.

Chess Records released the album in the U.S. on November 15, 1960, which was produced by label owner Leonard Chess. Chess issued the album on CD in 1986. MCA Records, the successor to Chess, digitally remastered it in 2001. The remastered version contains three bonus tracks recorded in Chicago in June 1960.

== Album cover ==
The album cover depicts Muddy Waters at the Newport Jazz Festival holding a semi-acoustic guitar. When the photographer, William Claxton, asked him to pose for the cover, Muddy left his Fender Telecaster (which he played during the concert) on the stage and instead held the semi-acoustic guitar, belonging to his friend John Lee Hooker.

== Legacy ==
Professional ratings
Review scores
Source	Rating
All About Jazz	(favorable)
AllMusic	5/5 stars
Blues Access	(favorable)
DownBeat	4/5 stars
fRoots	(favorable)
The Penguin Guide to Blues Recordings	3/4 stars
Record Mirror	3/5 stars
Southwest Blues	(favorable)

At Newport 1960 is generally praised for the upbeat performance by Waters and his band. Cub Koda, writing for AllMusic, says that Waters "lays it down tough and cool with a set that literally had [the audience] dancing in the aisles by the set close". Furthermore, he remarked that the opening track, "I Got My Brand on You", "positively burns the relatively tame (in comparison) studio take". Matthew Oshinsky, in 1001 Albums You Must Hear Before You Die, praises the "merciless refrain" in "Hoochie Coochie Man" and the "unvarnished moaning" in "Baby, Please Don't Go". He also enjoys Muddy's powerful baritone, Cotton's harmonica playing, Spann's "pub piano"–like playing and the overall danceable music.

Chris Smith, in 101 Albums That Changed Popular Music, praises Waters's "growly vocal presentation, energetic stage presence, and electrifying (literally and figuratively) performances". The album is ranked number 348 on Rolling Stone's "500 Greatest Albums of All Time", in which the band's playing is described as "tough, tight and in the groove" and Cotton's harmonica jams are mentioned as "a special treat", In Vibe's "100 Essential Albums of the 20th Century", a critic calls the album "immortal." The album is mentioned in The Rough Guide to Blues 100 Essential CDs.

Many musicians and bands, such as the Rolling Stones, Jimi Hendrix, AC/DC and Led Zeppelin, have been influenced by his electric sound and used this and his greatest hits album in creating a hard rock sound. At Newport 1960 was one of the first live blues albums.

== Track listing ==
Details are taken from the original 1960 Chess Records liner notes and may differ from other sources.

Side one
No.	Title	Writer(s)	Length
1.	"I Got My Brand on You"	McKinley Morganfield a.k.a. Muddy Waters (Note: Willie Dixon is credited on some reissues.)	4:32
2.	"I'm Your Hoochie Coochie Man"	Morganfield (Note: Dixon is credited on some reissues.)	3:00
3.	"Baby, Please Don't Go"	Morganfield (Note: Big Joe Williams is often credited on other releases.)	3:01
4.	"Soon Forgotten"	James Oden	4:22
5.	"Tiger in Your Tank"	Willie Dixon	4:30

Side two
No.	Title	Writer(s)	Length
1.	"I Feel So Good"	Big Bill Broonzy	2:55
2.	"Got My Mojo Working"	Morganfield (Note: Preston Foster is credited on some reissues.)	4:30
3.	"Got My Mojo Working, Part 2"	Morganfield (Note: Foster is credited on some reissues.)	2:48
4.	"Goodbye Newport Blues"	Langston Hughes, Morganfield	4:50

=== Reissue ===
2001 remastered bonus tracks
No.	Title	Writer(s)	Length
10.	"I Got My Brand on You"	Dixon	2:22
11.	"Soon Forgotten"	Oden	2:41
12.	"Tiger in Your Tank"	Dixon	2:17
13.	"Meanest Woman"	Morganfield	2:18

== Personnel ==
Original vinyl release

- Muddy Waters - guitar, vocals
- Otis Spann - piano, vocals
- Pat Hare - guitar
- James Cotton - harmonica
- Andrew Stephens - bass
- Francis Clay - drums
- Jack Tracy - liner notes
- Burt Goldblatt - photography

Additional credits for 1987 re-release

- Mary Katherine Aldin - liner notes
- Bob Schnieders - liner notes, coordination, research
- Geary Chansley - photo research
- Mike Fink - reissue design
- Steve Hoffman - master tape restoration
- Erick Labson - digital remastering
- Andy McKaie - reissue producer
- Beth Stempel - reissue producer
- Vartan - reissue art director
