= I'm Ready (Muddy Waters album) =

Studio album by Muddy Waters
- Released: January 1978
- Recorded: Westport, Connecticut, October–November 1977
- Genre: Blues
- Length: 40:43
- Label: Blue Sky
- Producer: Johnny Winter

Muddy Waters chronology
Hard Again (1977)	I'm Ready (1978)	Muddy "Mississippi" Waters - Live (1979)

I'm Ready is a studio album by the Chicago blues musician Muddy Waters. The second of his Johnny Winter-produced albums for the Blue Sky Records label, I'm Ready was issued one year after he found renewed commercial and critical success with Hard Again. The album earned Waters a Grammy Award in 1978. It was reissued in 2004 by the Epic/Legacy, with three additional songs.

== Background ==
Following his work on the previous album Hard Again (1977), Johnny Winter was again brought on as producer. The recording featured Jimmy Rogers and Big Walter Horton, both of whom had previously performed with Waters. Rogers had also participated in the original 1954 recording of "I'm Ready". At the time, Bob Margolin, who had been playing guitar in Waters' touring band, felt there was no room for him on this album due to the presence of three guitarists, Waters, Winter, and Rogers, but ultimately joined as bassist at Waters' suggestion.

The 2004 remastered CD included the bonus tracks "No Escape from the Blues", "That's All Right", and "Lonely Man Blues", all of which were outtakes from the sessions recorded for this album. On "That's All Right", Rogers also performed vocals.

== Critical reception ==
Professional ratings
Review scores
Source	Rating
AllMusic	4/5 stars
Blender	3/5 stars
Christgau's Record Guide	B
DownBeat	4/5 stars
The Penguin Guide to Blues Recordings	3/4 stars
The Rolling Stone Album Guide	3.5/5 stars
The Village Voice	B+

The Bay State Banner wrote that "the sharp distinctive tuning and chromatic slurs that mark his playing are still here, even though Waters now takes few slide guitar solos."

== Track listing ==
All tracks are composed by Muddy Waters (listed as McKinley Morganfield), except where noted.

Side one
No.	Title	Writer(s)	Length
1.	"I'm Ready"	Willie Dixon	3:26
2.	"33 Years"	Morganfield, Charles Edward Williams	5:20
3.	"Who Do You Trust"		5:00
4.	"Copper Brown"	Morganfield, Marva Brooks	4:58

Side two
No.	Title	Writer(s)	Length
1.	"I'm Your Hoochie Coochie Man"	Dixon	3:59
2.	"Mamie"	Morganfield, Jimmy Rogers	5:35
3.	"Rock Me"		3:54
4.	"Screamin' and Cryin'"		5:04
5.	"Good Morning, Little School Girl"	Sonny Boy Williamson	3:27

2004 Epic CD reissue extra tracks
No.	Title	Writer(s)	Length
10.	"No Escape from the Blues"	Morganfield, Williams	6:18
11.	"That's Alright"	Rogers	4:58
12.	"Lonely Man Blues"	Morganfield, Bob Margolin	4:19

== Personnel ==
- Muddy Waters – vocal, guitar
- Johnny Winter – guitar (tracks 1, 3–5, 7, 9), production
- Jimmy Rogers – guitar, vocals (track 11)
- Bob Margolin – guitar, bass
- Jerry Portnoy – harmonica (tracks 1, 4, 5, 7, 9)
- Big Walter Horton – harmonica
- Pinetop Perkins – piano
- Willie "Big Eyes" Smith – drums
