= King Bee (album) =

1981 album by Muddy Waters

Studio album by Muddy Waters
- Released: 1981
- Recorded: May 1980
- Genre: Blues
- Length: 39:54
- Label: Blue Sky
- Producer: Johnny Winter

Muddy Waters chronology
Muddy "Mississippi" Waters - Live (1979)	King Bee (1981)	The Chess Box (1989)

King Bee is the fourteenth and final studio album by blues singer and guitarist Muddy Waters. Released in 1981, it is third in a series of records done for the label Blue Sky Records under producer/guitarist Johnny Winter. Recorded in three days (and in the wake of Muddy's failing health) some of the band members, namely Winter and guitarist Bob Margolin, were not happy with the result. As his health deteriorated, Muddy was forced to cancel an increasing number of shows and never performed after early December 1981. He died of a heart attack on April 30, 1983.

The album was recorded in May 1980. A salary dispute between the band and Muddy Waters's manager, Scott Cameron, halted the session. Eventually the album was completed by using a couple of outtakes from 1977's Hard Again.

David Michael Kennedy was the photographer for the King Bee, providing photos for the front cover, back cover, and the inside album sleeve. The photo for the inside album sleeve was a picture of Muddy and his large family sitting in the living room of his home in Westmont, Illinois.

== Critical reception ==
Professional ratings
Review scores
Source	Rating
AllMusic	3/5 stars
Blender	3/5 stars
The Penguin Guide to Blues Recordings	3/4 stars
The Rolling Stone Album Guide	4/5 stars
The Village Voice	A−

The Boston Globe wrote: "Over the years, Waters' voice has become richer, but it is the arrangements of the blues that have suffered. With the exception of a few tunes, the music has lost its rhythmic tension."

The Rolling Stone Album Guide deemed King Bee "a fitting final testament."

== Track listing ==
All songs written by McKinley Morganfield, unless noted otherwise.

1. "I'm a King Bee" (James Moore) – 3:49
2. "Too Young to Know" – 4:28
3. "Mean Old Frisco Blues" (Arthur Crudup) – 3:44
4. "Forever Lonely" – 4:33
5. "I Feel Like Going Home" – 3:42
6. "Champagne & Reefer" – 4:36
7. "Sad Sad Day" – 5:22
8. "(My Eyes) Keep Me in Trouble" (Hap Walker) – 3:16
9. "Deep Down in Florida #2" (James Burke Oden) – 4:06
10. "No Escape from the Blues" (Charles Williams) – 2:04
11. "I Won't Go On" (James Burke Oden) – 4:16 (Bonus track issued 2004)
12. "Clouds in My Heart" – 7:46 (Bonus track issued 2004)

== Personnel ==
- Muddy Waters – vocals, guitar
- Johnny Winter – guitar, producer
- Bob Margolin – guitar
- Calvin Jones – bass
- Charles Calmese – bass on "Deep Down in Florida" and "Clouds in My Heart"
- Pinetop Perkins – piano
- Jerry Portnoy – harmonica
- James Cotton – harmonica on "Deep Down in Florida" and "Clouds in My Heart"
- Willie "Big Eyes" Smith – drums
