= Live at Theresa's 1975 =

Live album by Junior Wells
- Released: October 17, 2006
- Recorded: January 10 & 13, 1975
- Venue: Theresa's Lounge, Chicago
- Genre: Blues
- Label: Delmark
- Producer: Robert G. Koester

Junior Wells chronology
Junior Wells and Friends (1999)	Live at Theresa's 1975 (2006)

Professional ratings
Review scores
Source	Rating
AllMusic	4/5 stars
Rolling Stone	3.5/5 stars

Live at Theresa's 1975 is a live album recorded by blues vocalist and harmonica player Junior Wells at Theresa's Lounge in Chicago, Illinois, for Delmark Records.

The set was broadcast on local radio station WXRT.

== Critical reception ==
No Depression wrote that it "has to be one of the most effectively you-are-there live albums ever recorded." Record Collector wrote: "One of the highlights is [Wells's] between-song talks, a feature of his intimate live work which is captured here in full." The Seattle Post-Intelligencer called the album "notable for great guitar work from journeymen Phil Guy and others."

== Track listing ==
1. "Little by Little" (Amos Blakemore a.k.a. Junior Wells) - 4:41
2. "Snatch It Back and Hold It" (Blakemore) - 6:36
3. Talk - 0:24
4. "Love Her with a Feeling" (Tampa Red) - 4:12
5. Talk - 1:51
6. "Juke" (Little Walter) - 3:36
7. Talk - 1:00
8. "Happy Birthday" (Hill) - 1:27
9. Talk - 1:41
10. "Scratch My Back" (James Moore) - 5:44
11. "Help the Poor" (Charles Singleton) - 3:55
12. Talk - 0:39
13. "Come on in This House" (Blakemore) - 3:23
14. Talk - 0:41
15. "What My Mama Told Me" (Blakemore) - 8:04
16. "Key to the Highway" (Big Bill Broonzy, Charlie Segar) - 4:07
17. Talk - 0:12
18. "Goin' Down Slow" (James Burke Oden) - 8:27
19. Talk - 0:33
20. "Messin' with the Kid" (Melvin London) - 2:27

== Personnel ==
Band

- Vince Chappelle – drums
- Phil Guy – guitar
- Earnest Johnson – bass
- Sammy Lawhorn – guitar
- Byther Smith – guitar, vocals
- Junior Wells – harmonica, vocals

Production

- Marc PoKempner – photography
- Ken Rasek – engineer
- Steve Tomashefsky – liner notes, supervisor
- Robert G. Koester – producer
