= Nothin' but the Blues (Johnny Winter album) =

1977 studio album by Johnny Winter

Studio album by Johnny Winter
- Released: August 1977
- Recorded: 1977
- Studio: The Schoolhouse
- Genre: Chicago blues
- Length: 36:11
- Label: Blue Sky
- Producer: Johnny Winter

Johnny Winter chronology
Together (1976)	Nothin' but the Blues (1977)	White, Hot and Blue (1978)

Nothin' but the Blues is a 1977 album by guitarist and singer Johnny Winter.

On this album Winter moved away from the rock and blues blend of previous albums to a more blues-oriented album. It also saw a marked change in source of material, being exclusively written by Winter, apart from one song by Muddy Waters with whom Winter had recently collaborated and who featured on the album along with his band.

A statement in the album liner notes says, "I'd like to dedicate this album to all the people who enjoy my kind of blues and especially to Muddy Waters for giving me the inspiration to do it and for giving the world a lifetime of great blues. – Johnny Winter"

== Critical reception ==
Professional ratings
Review scores
Source	Rating
AllMusic	4/5 stars
The Penguin Guide to Blues Recordings	3/4 stars
Rolling Stone	(Not rated)

On AllMusic, William Ruhlmann said, "After a long period making rock records, Winter fronts the Muddy Waters band on the aptly titled Nothin' but the Blues.... Winter sounds happier than ever before on this Chicago blues workout."

Parallel Forces wrote, "Released in the wake of [the Muddy Waters album] Hard Again, Nothin' but the Blues has the distinction of being recorded with the same musicians. These two albums mark the return to grace of [Johnny Winter] in the world of blues that he had somewhat neglected in previous years, devoted more to rock."

== Track listing ==
All songs written by Johnny Winter, except "Walkin' thru the Park" by Muddy Waters.

1. "Tired of Tryin'" - 3:40
2. "TV Mama" - 3:11
3. "Sweet Love and Evil Women" - 2:50
4. "Everybody's Blues" - 5:03
5. "Drinkin' Blues" - 3:40
6. "Mad Blues" - 4:17
7. "It Was Rainin'" - 5:53
8. "Bladie Mae" - 3:30
9. "Walkin' thru the Park" - 4:07

== Personnel ==
- Johnny Winter – vocals, electric guitar, metal body acoustic guitar, slide guitar, bass guitar, drums
- Muddy Waters – vocals
- James Cotton – harmonica
- Pinetop Perkins – piano
- Bob Margolin – electric guitar
- Charles Calmese – electric bass
- Willie "Big Eyes" Smith – drums
