= The Muddy Waters Woodstock Album =

Studio album by Muddy Waters
- Released: April 1975
- Recorded: February 6 & 7, 1975
- Studio: Bearsville's Studio at "Turtle Creek", Woodstock, New York
- Genre: Blues
- Length: 43:45
- Label: Chess; CH 60035
- Producer: Henry Glover

Muddy Waters chronology
"Unk" in Funk (1974)	The Muddy Waters Woodstock Album (1975)	Hard Again (1977)

The Muddy Waters Woodstock Album is an album by blues musician Muddy Waters, released by the Chess label in 1975. The album features Levon Helm and Garth Hudson, from the Band, and Paul Butterfield.

== Reception ==
Professional ratings
Review scores
Source	Rating
AllMusic	3.5/5 stars
The Penguin Guide to Blues Recordings	2.5/4 stars

The album won the Grammy Award for Best Ethnic or Traditional Folk Recording at the 18th Annual Grammy Awards in 1976.

In a retrospective assessment, AllMusic reviewer Bruce Eder stated that "this album worked best because they let Waters be himself, producing music that compared favorably to his concerts of the period, which were wonderful. His final album for Chess (recorded at Bearsville studio in Woodstock, not in Chicago), with Helm and fellow Band-member Garth Hudson teaming up with Waters' touring band, it was a rocking (in the bluesy sense) soulful swansong to the label where he got his start. Waters covers some songs he knew back when, plays some slide, and generally has a great time on this Grammy-winning album".

== Track listing ==
All compositions by McKinley Morganfield except where noted

1. "Why Are People Like That" (Bobby Charles) – 3:35
2. "Going Down to Main Street" – 3:57
3. "Born with Nothing" – 5:20
4. "Caledonia" (Fleecie Moore) – 6:14
5. "Funny Sounds" – 4:32
6. "Love, Deep as the Ocean" – 5:10
7. "Let the Good Times Roll" (Fleecie Moore, Sam Theard) – 5:13
8. "Kansas City" (Jerry Leiber, Mike Stoller) – 5:09
9. "Fox Squirrel" – 3:56 [Bonus track on CD reissues]

== Personnel ==
- Muddy Waters – vocals, guitar
- Garth Hudson – organ, accordion, saxophone
- Paul Butterfield – harmonica
- Bob Margolin – guitar
- Pinetop Perkins – piano
- Howard Johnson – saxophone
- Fred Carter Jr. – bass, guitar
- Levon Helm – drums, bass
