= The London Muddy Waters Sessions =

Studio album by Muddy Waters
- Released: 1972
- Studios: IBC, London. Horns at The Record Plant, New York City
- Genre: Blues
- Label: Chess
- Producers: Esmond Edwards, Ian Green

Muddy Waters chronology
Live at Mr. Kelly's (1971)	The London Muddy Waters Sessions (1972)	Can't Get No Grindin' (1973)

London Sessions chronology
The London Howlin' Wolf Sessions (1971)	The London Muddy Waters Sessions (1972)	The London Chuck Berry Sessions (1972)

Professional ratings
Review scores
Source	Rating
Christgau's Record Guide	B
The Penguin Guide to Blues Recordings	2.5/4 stars
Select	4/5 medals

The London Muddy Waters Sessions is a studio album by Muddy Waters, released in 1972 on Chess Records. A follow-up to 1971's The London Howlin' Wolf Sessions, the concept was to combine American bluesmen with British and Irish blues/rock stars. The album was an attempt to capitalise on the increasing popularity of traditional blues music and blues artists in Britain.

The London Muddy Waters Sessions won the 1972 Grammy Award for Best Ethnic or Traditional Folk Recording; it marked the second of six times that Muddy Waters would win that award.

== The Players ==
The album features Waters on slide and acoustic guitar, backed by Sammy Lawhorn and Irishman Rory Gallagher on guitar, Carey Bell on harmonica, Rick Grech on bass, Georgie Fame (credited as "George Fortune") and Steve Winwood on piano and organ, Mitch Mitchell (from Jimi Hendrix Experience) and Herbie Lovelle on drums and Rosetta Hightower on vocals. Producer Esmond Edwards later brought the tapes to New York to mix them and overdubbed horns with Ernie Royal and Joe Newman on trumpet, Garnett Brown on trombone and Seldon Powell on tenor saxophone.

Irish blues-rocker Gallagher, who began a successful solo career following the demise of his trio, Taste, played on three tracks, providing solos on "Young Fashion Ways" and two others. Winwood reprised his keyboard role on the Howlin' Wolf sessions, making appearances on three tracks. Fame, a swinging-jazz-blues player who went on to collaborating with Van Morrison, played on the remaining tracks.

Mitchell, who had worked with Georgie Fame's Blues Flames prior to joining the Jimi Hendrix Experience and drew his greatest inspiration from jazzmen such as Elvin Jones, played on most of the album. On the shuffles like "I'm Ready" and "Blind Man Blues", the drummer is New York session veteran Lovelle.

Grech was best known as one-fourth of Blind Faith, together with Winwood. It is also noteworthy that Blind Faith included two ex-Cream members, Ginger Baker and Eric Clapton – the latter having played on The London Howlin' Wolf Sessions, while Grech had previously been a member of Traffic, another band featuring Winwood.

Blues harp man Carey Bell was essential. Like Muddy, Bell was born in Mississippi and came of age in Chicago; like Lawhorn, he was a long-time member of Muddy Waters' band, having previously worked with John Lee Hooker, Eddie Taylor and Earl Hooker. Bell alternated between a standard Marine Band harp and the big double-key chromatic harp which was his specialty.

== Track listing ==
1. "Blind Man Blues" (Lafayette Leake) – 3:30
2. "Key to the Highway" (McKinley Morganfield) – 2:24
3. "Young Fashioned Ways" (Willie Dixon) – 4:22
4. "I'm Gonna Move to the Outskirts of Town" (William Weldon) – 3:54
5. "Who's Gonna Be Your Sweet Man When I'm Gone" (McKinley Morganfield) – 5:03
6. "Walkin' Blues" (Willie Dixon) – 3:00
7. "I'm Ready" (Willie Dixon) – 4:08
8. "Sad Sad Day" (McKinley Morganfield) – 5:15
9. "I Don't Know Why" (Willie Dixon) – 4:00

== Personnel ==
- Muddy Waters – slide guitar, vocals
- Sammy Lawhorn – guitar
- Rory Gallagher – guitar
- Carey Bell Harrington – harmonica
- Rick Grech – bass
- George Fortune – piano, organ
- Steve Winwood – piano, organ
- Mitch Mitchell – drums
- Herbie Lovelle – drums
- Rosetta Hightower – vocals on "Blind Man Blues"
- Ernie Royal – trumpet
- Joe Newman – trumpet
- Garnett Brown – trombone
- Seldon Powell – tenor saxophone
- Johnny Pate – horn arrangements
