= Mannish Boy =

Song first recorded by Muddy Waters in 1955

"Manish Boy"
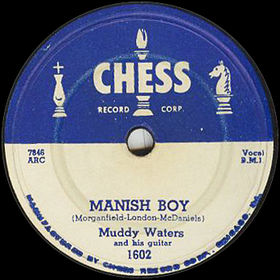

Single by Muddy Waters

from the album Hard Again
- B-side: "Young Fashioned Ways"
- Released: June 1955
- Recorded: Chicago, May 24, 1955
- Genre: Blues
- Length: 2:55
- Label: Chess
- Songwriters: McKinley Morganfield a.k.a. Muddy Waters; Mel London; Ellas McDaniel a.k.a. Bo Diddley
- Producers: Leonard Chess; Phil Chess

Muddy Waters singles chronology
"I'm Ready" (1954)	"Manish Boy" (1955)	"Sugar Sweet" / "Trouble No More" (1955)

"Mannish Boy" (or "Manish Boy" as it was first labeled) is a blues standard written by Muddy Waters, Mel London, and Bo Diddley (with Waters and Diddley being credited under their birth names). First recorded in 1955 by Waters, it serves as an "answer song" to Bo Diddley's "I'm a Man", which was in turn inspired by Waters' and Willie Dixon's "Hoochie Coochie Man". "Mannish Boy" features a repeating stop-time figure on one chord throughout the song.

Although the song contains sexual boasting, its repetition of "I'm a man, I spell M, A child, N" was understood as political. Waters had recently left the South for Chicago. "Growing up in the South, Black Americans [would] never be referred to as a man – but as 'boy'. In this context, the song [is] an assertion of black manhood."

== Recordings and releases ==
Waters recorded the song in Chicago on May 24, 1955. It is his only recording between January 1953 and June 1957 that did not feature Little Walter on harmonica (who was on tour supporting his then-number one hit "My Babe" and thus unavailable for the recording session) and is one of few studio recordings with Junior Wells. Also accompanying Muddy Waters are Jimmy Rogers on guitar, Fred Below on drums, and an unidentified female chorus.

Waters recorded several versions of "Mannish Boy" during his career. In 1968, he recorded it for the Electric Mud album in Marshall Chess' attempt to attract the rock market. After he left Chess, he recorded it for the 1977 Hard Again album which was produced by Johnny Winter. A live version with Winter appears on Muddy "Mississippi" Waters – Live (1979). Waters also performed it at the Band's farewell concert The Last Waltz, and the performance is included in the documentary film of the concert as well as on the film's soundtrack of the same title.

== Charts and recognition ==
The song reached number five during a stay of six weeks in the Billboard R&B chart. The song was Muddy Waters' only chart appearance on the UK Singles Chart, peaking at number 51 in 1988.

In 1986, Muddy Waters' original "Mannish Boy" was inducted into the Blues Hall of Fame "Classics of Blues Recordings" category. It was also included in the Rock and Roll Hall of Fame's list of the "500 Songs that Shaped Rock and Roll". "Mannish Boy" is ranked number 425 in Rolling Stone magazine's list of the "500 Greatest Songs of All Time". The early David Bowie band, the Mannish Boys, took its name from the song, as did the blues band the Mannish Boys.
