= 101 Albums That Changed Popular Music =

2009 book by Chris Smith

- Author: Chris Smith
- Language: English
- Genre: Reference work
- Publisher: Oxford University Press
- Publication date: July 2009
- Publication place: United States
- Media type: Print
- Pages: 304
- ISBN: 978-0-19-537371-4

101 Albums That Changed Popular Music is a musical reference book written by Chris Smith, an American journalist, author and cultural critic. It was published in July 2009 by Oxford University Press.

== Synopsis ==
The book tells the history of popular music from the introduction of the long-playing (LP) record in 1948. It focuses on key albums, from the Folkways compilation Anthology of American Folk Music (1952) to the White Stripes' Elephant (2003).

== Criteria ==
Chris Smith previously wrote about music and popular culture for Rolling Stone, Billboard and MTV, among others, and authored The Greenwood Encyclopedia of Rock History, published by Greenwood Press in 2006. In 101 Albums That Changed Popular Music, he focuses on albums and their impact on the cultural landscape, as opposed to songs and musical performance. In the book's preface, he says that, rather than looking to compile a list of the "best" albums, the criteria for inclusion was a combination of an album's sales performance and influence on American music and culture, together with the level of critical commentary it had inspired. He says that artists such as Chuck Berry, Bill Haley and Hank Williams, and many pioneers in the blues genre are necessarily excluded, since their most influential work was either confined to 78rpm singles or achieved through live performance.

In Smith's opinion, Miles Davis is "the most revolutionary artist" in the book, while the Beatles' Sgt. Pepper's Lonely Hearts Club Band (1967) is the album that most clearly satisfies the three criteria for inclusion. He comments that the featured albums show artistic ambition and influence in the areas of, variously, technological experimentation, mixing musical genres, presentation of alternate realities, and commentary on contemporaneous music – the latter being demonstrated especially by the Mothers of Invention's Freak Out! (1966), which ridiculed "both the status quo and the counterculture".

The book includes a timeline of key events in the history of recorded sound and divides the main discussion into seven chapters, starting with "The Birth of the Long Player, 1952–1962". The other six chapters cover the periods 1963–1967, 1968–1971, 1972–1976, 1977–1985, 1986–1990 and 1991–2008. Each of the featured albums is afforded two or three pages of text. Smith also includes appendices titled "Ten Albums That Almost Made It" and "Ten Important Producers". In the first of these, he comments that his omission of the Beatles' Revolver (1966) from the main body of the book is "somewhat unfair".

== Artists ==
The following artists have albums featured in 101 Albums That Changed Popular Music:

- 1952–1962: Elvis Presley, Miles Davis (2 entries), the Weavers, the Dave Brubeck Quartet, Muddy Waters, Robert Johnson, Ray Charles
- 1963–1967: Bob Dylan (2 entries), the Beatles (3), the Byrds (2), Frank Zappa and the Mothers of Invention, the Beach Boys, the Doors, Jefferson Airplane, the Velvet Underground, the Jimi Hendrix Experience
- 1968–1971: the Moody Blues, the Band, Led Zeppelin, MC5, the Who, King Crimson, Captain Beefheart and His Magic Band, James Taylor, Miles Davis, Black Sabbath, Carole King, Marvin Gaye, Sly and the Family Stone, Mahavishnu Orchestra
- 1972–1976: David Bowie, Iggy and the Stooges, Pink Floyd, New York Dolls, Herbie Hancock, Kraftwerk, Linda Ronstadt, Aerosmith, Bruce Springsteen, Kiss, Patti Smith, Brian Eno, Queen, Waylon Jennings/Willie Nelson/Jessi Colter/Tompall Glaser, Parliament, the Ramones, Boston
- 1977–1985: Bob Marley and the Wailers, Sex Pistols, Television, Pere Ubu, Van Halen, Funkadelic, Neil Young, the Clash, AC/DC, Michael Jackson, Herbie Hancock, Def Leppard, U2, R.E.M., Stevie Ray Vaughan and Double Trouble, Metallica, Bruce Springsteen, Prince, Hüsker Dü, Madonna
- 1986–1990: Run-DMC, Paul Simon, Beastie Boys, Suzanne Vega, Guns N' Roses, Public Enemy, Sonic Youth, De La Soul, N.W.A, Nine Inch Nails, Uncle Tupelo, Garth Brooks
- 1991–2008: Ice-T, Nirvana, Red Hot Chili Peppers, Tori Amos, Dr. Dre, Liz Phair, Wu-Tang Clan, Green Day, Ani DiFranco, Beck, Spice Girls, Dixie Chicks, Eminem, the White Stripes.

In addition, the "Ten Albums That Almost Made It" appendix contains works by Ornette Coleman, James Brown, the Rolling Stones, the Beatles, Stevie Wonder, the Eagles, Pink Floyd, the Police, U2 and Alanis Morissette.

== Critical reception ==
Eric Weisbard, the co-editor of Spin magazine's Alternative Record Guide and an organizer of the Experience Music Project conferences, wrote that, just as albums are "structures of order, turning songs, an inherently ersatz form, into statements", Smith's book "albums the album, compiling the 'statement' works that prevailed in jazz, folk, and two generations of rock into a single package". The Financial Times described Smith's 101 Albums as a "diverting" work that was "an upmarket version of the best-of lists that rock fans love to argue over". Express Milwaukee's reviewer wrote: "Well argued, Smith compiles a history of rock that is generally correct and identifies such important trends as the fertile interplay between the Beatles and Dylan, the transmogrification of communal '60s folk-rock into me-only '70s singer-songwriter and the punk's reaction against hippy hypocrisy and pompous arena rock."

In his review for The Independent, Christopher Hirst admired Smith's writing and choice of suitable quotes. He said the inclusion of early albums such as Elvis Presley (1956), Muddy Waters at Newport (1960) and The Freewheelin' Bob Dylan (1963) was logical, but "sometimes the wrong record is picked by the right artist" in the case of the Beatles' Rubber Soul (1965) and Davis' Bitches Brew (1970), which were chosen over Revolver and In a Silent Way (1969), respectively. Hirst also found the inclusion of Boston (1976) and Van Halen (1978) "inexplicable" and bemoaned the absence of Neil Young's After the Gold Rush (1970) and the Allman Brothers Band's At Fillmore East (1971). Douglas Lord, in a review for Library Journal, said the coverage and detail was impressive and that the author "prov[es] a consummate music critic/historian". Lord also approved of the recognition afforded Television's Marquee Moon (1977), Metallica's Kill 'Em All (1983) and Public Enemy's It Takes a Nation of Millions to Hold Us Back (1988), alongside the expected "classics" from the 1960s and 1970s.

The website for the JW Pepper sheet music company describes the book as "A lively and provocative account" that "tells the fascinating stories behind the most groundbreaking, influential, and often controversial albums ever recorded".
