= "Unk" in Funk =

Studio album by Muddy Waters
- Released: March 1974
- Recorded: January 29 & 30, 1974
- Studio: Ter-Mar, Chicago
- Genre: Blues
- Length: 34:09
- Label: Chess
- Producer: Muddy Waters, Ralph Bass

Muddy Waters chronology
Can't Get No Grindin' (1973)	"Unk" in Funk (1974)	The Muddy Waters Woodstock Album (1975)

"Unk" in Funk is an album by blues musician Muddy Waters, released by the Chess label in 1974.

== Reception ==
Professional ratings
Review scores
Source	Rating
AllMusic	3.5/5 stars

AllMusic reviewer Lindsay Planer stated, "The nine sides on Unk in Funk (1974) are among the last newly recorded material that Muddy Waters would issue during his nearly 30 year association with Chess Records. Backing up the Chicago blues icon is a band he'd carry with him for the remainder of his performing career ... They run through a better than average selection of Waters' classics with newer compositions more or less tossed in, presumably to keep the track list fresh. Although Waters certainly has nothing to prove, he attacks his old catalog with the drive and command of a man putting it all on the line".

== Track listing ==
All compositions by McKinley Morganfield except where noted.

1. "Rollin' and Tumblin'" – 7:28
2. "Just to Be with You" (Berney Roth) – 3:55
3. "Electric Man" (Amelia Cooper, Terry Abrahamson) – 3:10
4. "Trouble No More" – 2:40
5. ""Unk" in Funk" (Cooper, Abrahamson, Ted Kerland) – 3:22
6. "Drive My Blues Away" – 2:48
7. "Katie" – 3:04
8. "Waterboy Waterboy" – 4:00
9. "Everything Gonna Be Alright" (Walter Jacobs) – 3:35

== Personnel ==
- Muddy Waters – vocals, guitar
- Carey Bell Harrington (tracks 1–3 & 6–8), George Buford (tracks 4 & 9), Paul Oscher (track 5) – harmonica
- Pinetop Perkins – piano, harpsichord
- Bob Margolin, Luther "Guitar Junior" Johnson – guitars
- Calvin Jones – bass
- Willie Smith – drums
