= Deep in the Blues =

Studio album by James Cotton
- Released: 1996
- Recorded: 1995
- Studio: Conway
- Genre: Blues
- Label: Verve
- Producer: John Snyder

James Cotton chronology
Best of the Verve Years (1995)	Deep in the Blues (1996)	Best of the Vanguard Years (1999)

Deep in the Blues is an album by the American musician James Cotton, released in 1996. It peaked at No. 13 on Billboard's Blues Albums chart. Deep in the Blues won a Grammy Award for "Best Traditional Blues Album". It also won a W. C. Handy Award for best "Acoustic Blues Album". Cotton supported the album with a North American tour.

== Production ==
The album was produced by John Snyder. Cotton was backed by Joe Louis Walker on guitar and Charlie Haden on bass. "Strange Things Happen" is a cover of the Percy Mayfield song. "Dealin' with the Devil" is a version of the Sonny Boy Williamson I song. "You Got My Nose Open" was written by Matt "Guitar" Murphy. "Worried Life Blues" is a take on the Big Maceo Merriweather song.

== Critical reception ==
Professional ratings
Review scores
Source	Rating
AllMusic	3/5 stars
Chicago Tribune	2.5/4 stars
Edmonton Journal	4/5 stars
Los Angeles Daily News	4/4 stars
The Penguin Guide to Blues Recordings	4/4 stars
Pittsburgh Post-Gazette	3.5/4 stars
The Virgin Encyclopedia of the Blues	2/5 stars

The Edmonton Journal determined that, "if Haden and Walker are out of their regular context they sound happy to be there, offering a tasty, enthusiastic backup that propels the harp man to some fine blowing." The Los Angeles Daily News praised the "surprisingly rootsy, all-acoustic sound." Guitar Player said that "easy-swinging Joe conjures a prewar vibe as he delves into mojo boogies and slow blues."

The Sun-Sentinel opined that, "with Cotton's hound-dog singing out front and center, the harp's wail pierces the sandpapery vocal wall like a laser." The Chicago Tribune lamented that "nothing can camouflage the truckload of gravel strewn atop Cotton's once-roaring pipes." The Pittsburgh Post-Gazette concluded that the album "captures the blues harp master at the absolute top of his game, groanin' and moanin' about the hold misery's got on his soul."

AllMusic wrote that "the sound is intimate and raw, which is a welcome change from Cotton's usual overproduced records."

== Track listing ==
No.	Title	Length
1.	"Down at Your Buryin'"
2.	"All Walks of Life"
3.	"You Got My Nose Open"
4.	"Dealin' with the Devil"
5.	"Strange Things Happen"
6.	"Country Boy"
7.	"Vineyard Blues"
8.	"Worried Life Blues"
9.	"Two Trains Runnin'"
10.	"Ozark Mountain Railroad"
11.	"Sad Letter"
12.	"Play with Your Poodle"
13.	"Blues in Your Sleep"
14.	"Everybody's Fishin'"
