= Can't Get No Grindin' =

Studio album by Muddy Waters
- Released: August 1973
- Recorded: March 1972
- Studios: Ter-Mar, Chicago, IL
- Genre: Blues
- Length: 35:26
- Labels: Chess; CH 50023
- Producer: Ralph Bass

Muddy Waters chronology
The London Muddy Waters Sessions (1972)	Can't Get No Grindin' (1973)	"Unk" in Funk (1974)

Can't Get No Grindin' is an album by blues musician Muddy Waters, released by the Chess label in 1973.

== Reception ==
Professional ratings
Review scores
Source	Rating
AllMusic	3/5 stars

The album was inducted into the Blues Hall of Fame in 1991 as a Classic of Blues Recording

Rolling Stone said, "Muddy Waters has caught up to his legend and made an album of straight Chicago blues, sounding as fiery and nasty as he managed to 20 years ago. His unjustly ignored guitar acts as a fine counterpoint to the lyrics, as well as providing extra energy in its own right. ... Muddy can still choose and demand the utmost from the cream of Chicago’s bluesman crop. No superstars or electronic gimmickry invade the blues club mood that Muddy conjures with ease on Can't Get No Grinding" AllMusic reviewer Bruce Eder stated, "Muddy's next-to-last Chess album, Can't Get No Grindin' marked a return to working with a band of his own after several experimental line-ups and recordings ... The music is raw, hard-edged, and sharp (the guitars slash and cut), more like a successor to Muddy's classic 1950s sides (he rethinks a bunch '50s numbers here) than to the London Sessions, Super Blues, brass blow-outs, and psychedelic albums that he'd been doing. It's also easy to hear Muddy's heart in this release -- he fairly oozes soul out of every note he sings". The Blues Foundation's Jim O'Neil noted, "Most of Muddy’s working band, joined by alumnus James Cotton on harp, backed him on a quickly recorded session (Bass preferred live spontaneity to perfected multiple takes when producing blues) that found the master and his crew in fine form, delivering the kind of blues that made Muddy famous back in the 1950s. Chess had tried to take him in more contemporary directions on other albums of the ’60s and ’70s but ended up with a classic by just letting Muddy cut a straight-ahead, no-frills, no-rock-stars album".

== Track listing ==
All compositions by McKinley Morganfield except where noted

1. "Can't Get No Grindin' (What's the Matter with the Mill)" – 2:45
2. "Mother's Bad Luck Child" – 4:57
3. "Funky Butt" – 2:53
4. "Sad Letter" – 4:15
5. "Someday I'm Gonna Ketch You" – 3:12
6. "Love Weapon" – 4:05
7. "Garbage Man" (Willie Hammond) — 2:40
8. "After Hours" (Avery Parrish) – 3:50
9. "Whiskey Ain't No Good" – 4:32
10. "Muddy Waters' Shuffle" – 2:20

== Personnel ==
- Muddy Waters – vocals, guitar
- James Cotton – harmonica
- Pinetop Perkins – piano, harpsichord
- Sam Lawhorn, Pee Wee Madison – guitar
- Calvin Jones – bass
- Willie Smith – drums
