= High Compression =

Studio album by James Cotton
- Released: 1984
- Genre: Blues
- Label: Alligator
- Producer: Bruce Iglauer, James Cotton

James Cotton chronology
Two Sides of the Blues (1982)	High Compression (1984)	Live from Chicago: Mr. Superharp Himself (1986)

High Compression is an album by the American musician James Cotton, released in 1984. He supported it with a North American tour.

== Production ==
The album was produced by Bruce Iglauer and Cotton. He recorded the album with two backing groups, one made up of longtime Chicago blues practitioners, including the guitarist Guitar Slim and the pianist Pinetop Perkins, the other of younger musicians, including the guitarist Michael Coleman. Cotton wanted to update his sound by adding a horn section and funk influences to some of the tracks. "Diggin' My Potatoes" was written by Washboard Sam. "No Cuttin' Loose" is a cover of the Junior Parker song. "Ain't Doin' Too Bad" is a version of the Bobby Bland song. "23 Hours Too Long" was written by Eddie Boyd. "Ying Yang" is a cover of the Steve Miller song.

== Critical reception ==
Professional ratings
Review scores
Source	Rating
All Music Guide to the Blues	5/5 stars
The Commercial Appeal	3/4 stars
The Encyclopedia of Popular Music	2/5 stars
Houston Chronicle	3.5/5 stars
Lincoln Journal Star	2.5/5 stars
MusicHound Blues: The Essential Album Guide	4/5 stars
The Penguin Guide to Blues Recordings	2.5/4 stars
The Philadelphia Inquirer	3/4 stars
The Rolling Stone Jazz & Blues Album Guide	4.5/5 stars
Valley Advocate	3.5/5 stars

The Commercial Appeal called Cotton's playing "superb in tone and interpretation." The Houston Chronicle opined that "James's vocals are a tad hoarse, but it's that big, booming harmonica which takes over". The Daily Press said, "The combination of his steel-shredding harp solos set off against his roaring vocals ... is a fearsome sound to behold." The Boston Globe noted the "relaxed authority and self-assuredness about the man's voice."

== Track listing ==
No.	Title	Length
1.	"Diggin' My Potatoes"
2.	"Ying Yang"
3.	"23 Hours Too Long"
4.	"No More Doggin'"
5.	"No Cuttin' Loose"
6.	"Ain't Doin' Too Bad"
7.	"Sunny Road"
8.	"Superharp"
9.	"Easy Loving"
10.	"High Compression"
