= Live at Mr. Kelly's =

Live album by Muddy Waters
- Released: October 1971
- Recorded: June 1971
- Venues: Mister Kelly's, Chicago, IL
- Genre: Blues
- Length: 55:28
- Labels: Chess; CH 50012
- Producer: Ralph Bass

Muddy Waters chronology
Fathers and Sons (1969)	Live at Mr. Kelly's (1971)	The London Muddy Waters Sessions (1972)

Live at Mister Kelly's, often stylized as "Live" (At Mr. Kelly's), is a live album by blues musician Muddy Waters, released by the Chess label in 1971.

== Reception ==
Professional ratings
Review scores
Source	Rating
AllMusic	3/5 stars
The Penguin Guide to Blues Recordings	2.5/4 stars

Rolling Stone said, "All in all, it’s a rainy night sounding, laid-back album with the emphasis on good solid blues" AllMusic reviewer Bruce Eder stated, "Muddy Waters Live (At Mr. Kelly's) shows precisely how fortuitous Muddy Waters' history with Chess Records was. ... This album, recorded during two June 1971 gigs at one of Chicago's top clubs, was the third full-length concert release of his career ... The core of the band that would work with him for the rest of the '70s was already with him, and the man himself was in excellent form -- in voice and on slide guitar ... the effect of hearing a master of the blues virtuoso band in action is overpowering".

== Track listing ==
All compositions by McKinley Morganfield except where noted

1. "What Is That She Got" – 4:30
2. "You Don't Have to Go" (Jimmy Reed) – 3:25
3. "Strange Woman" (Morganfield, Ralph Bass) – 5:00
4. "Blow Wind Blow" – 4:30
5. "Country Boy" – 4:58
6. "Nine Below Zero" (Sonny Boy Williamson) – 4:45
7. "Stormy Monday Blues" (Aaron Walker) – 4:38
8. "Mudcat" – 3:37
9. "Boom, Boom" (John Lee Hooker) – 4:38
10. "C.C. Woman" – 3:45

== Personnel ==
- Muddy Waters – vocals, guitar
- Joe "Denim" (tracks 1, 3 & 9), Paul Oscher – harmonica
- Pinetop Perkins – piano
- Sam Lawhorn, Pee Wee Madison – guitar
- Calvin Jones – bass
- Willie Smith – drums
