= Blue Sky Records =

Columbia Records label

- Parent company: Sony Music Entertainment
- Founded: 1973
- Founder: Steve Paul
- Defunct: 1983
- Status: Defunct
- Distributor(s): Columbia Records
- Genre: Various
- Country of origin: U.S.

Blue Sky Records was a custom record label created by Steve Paul for Columbia Records, featuring acts managed by Steve Paul, primarily blues-oriented performers Johnny Winter, Edgar Winter, Rick Derringer, Dan Hartman, David Johansen, and Muddy Waters.

== History ==
Blue Sky Records was started by Steve Paul in 1973. The executive vice president of the specialty label, promoted and distributed by Columbia Records, was Rick Dobbis. Dobbis later became the president of Sony Music International and senior vice-president at Arista Records. Through the production activities of Johnny Winter, the label was instrumental in reviving the career of Muddy Waters. In 1983, when Winter departed from the label, the label largely ceased operations & was folded into Columbia.

== Principal Blue Sky Records releases ==
- 1973 Rick Derringer, All American Boy
- 1974 Johnny Winter, John Dawson Winter III
- 1975 Rick Derringer, Spring Fever
- 1975 Edgar Winter, The Edgar Winter Group With Rick Derringer
- 1975 Edgar Winter, Jasmine Nightdreams
- 1976 Johnny Winter, Captured Live!
- 1976 Dan Hartman, Who Is Dan Hartman? (Promo release)
- 1976 Johnny Winter and Edgar Winter, Together
- 1976 Dan Hartman, Images
- 1977 Muddy Waters, Hard Again
- 1977 Edgar Winter, Edgar Winter's White Trash - Recycled
- 1977 Johnny Winter, Nothin' But the Blues
- 1977 Rick Derringer, Live
- 1978 Muddy Waters, I'm Ready
- 1978 Johnny Winter, White, Hot and Blue
- 1978 Dan Hartman, Instant Replay
- 1978 David Johansen, David Johansen
- 1979 Muddy Waters, Muddy "Mississippi" Waters - Live
- 1979 Dan Hartman, Relight My Fire
- 1979 David Johansen, In Style
- 1979 Edgar Winter, The Edgar Winter Album
- 1980 Johnny Winter, Raisin' Cain
- 1981 Muddy Waters, King Bee
- 1981 Dan Hartman, It Hurts to Be In Love
- 1981 David Johansen, Here Comes The Night
- 1982 David Johansen, Live It Up
