= Bob Margolin =

American electric blues guitarist (born 1949)

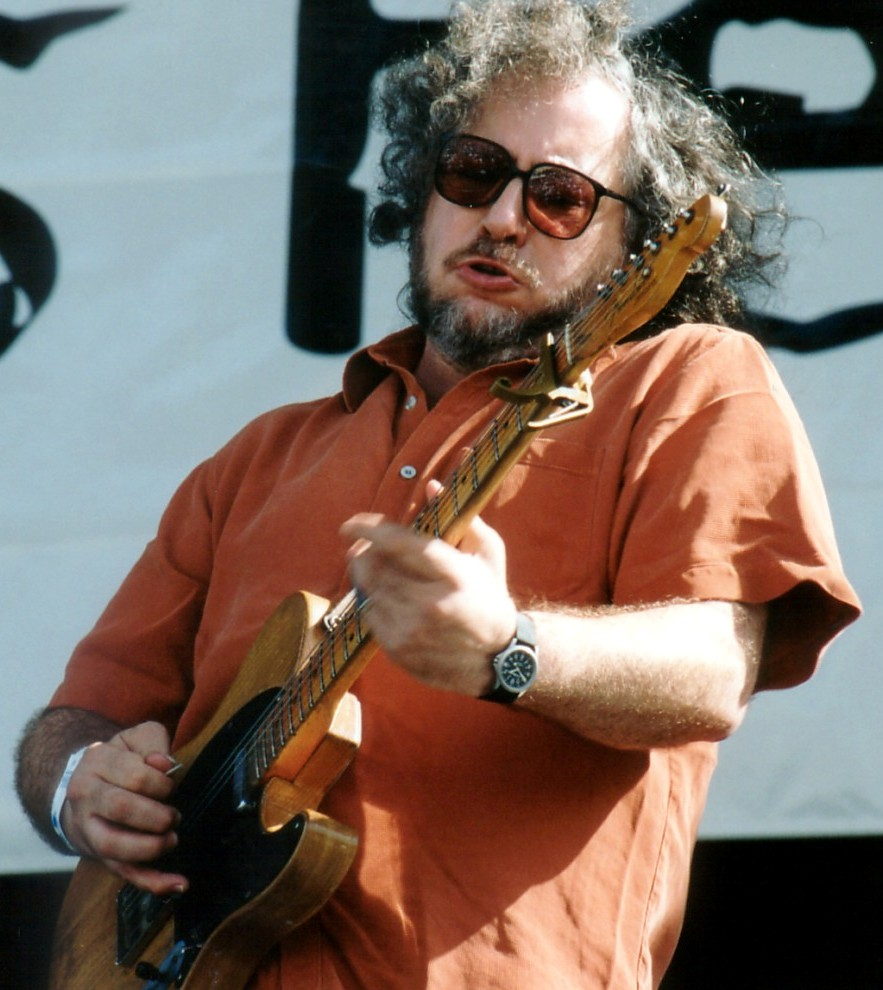
- Margolin at the 1996 Riverwalk Blues Festival

Background information
- Also known as: "Steady Rollin"
- Born: May 9, 1949 (age 77); Brookline, Massachusetts, U.S.
- Genres: Rock and roll Electric blues
- Occupations: Musician, guitarist
- Instruments: Vocals, guitar
- Years active: 1964-present
- Labels: Alligator Records, Blind Pig, Telarc, Steady Rollin' Records, VizzTone Label Group
- Spouse: Pamela Margolin
- Website: Bobmargolin.com

Bob Margolin (born May 9, 1949) is an American electric blues guitarist. His nickname is Steady Rollin'. In 2026 Margolin was inducted into the Blues Hall of Fame.

== Biography ==
Margolin started playing guitar in 1964, and his first appearance on record was with Boston psychedelic band The Freeborne, and their 1967 album Peak Impressions. While born in Massachusetts, he has long lived in High Point, North Carolina with his wife Pamela.

Margolin was a backing musician for Muddy Waters from 1973 to 1980, performing with Waters and The Band in The Last Waltz. As a solo recording artist, he has recorded albums for Alligator Records, Blind Pig, Telarc and his own Steady Rollin' record label. In 1977 he appeared on Johnny Winter's album Nothin' But The Blues along with Muddy Waters, Pinetop Perkins, James Cotton, and others. In 1978, he made a guest appearance on Big Joe Duskin's debut album, Cincinnati Stomp, on Arhoolie Records.

In 1979, he made a guest appearance, along with Pinetop Perkins, on The Nighthawks album, Jacks & Kings.

In 1994, he appeared with Jerry Portnoy as guest musicians on the album, Ice Cream Man by John Brim. It received a Blues Music Award (formerly W. C. Handy Award) nomination as the best 'Traditional Blues Album of the Year'.

Margolin is a columnist for the Blues Revue magazine.

In 2013, Margolin was nominated for a Blues Music Award in the 'Traditional Blues Male Artist' category. His joint album with Ann Rabson, Not Alone was also nominated in the 'Acoustic Album' category.

In 2020, Margolin was presented with a Blues Music Award for 'Acoustic Album of the Year' for This Guitar and Tonight.

Bob Margolin is the musical director for The Pinetop Perkins Workshop Experience - an annual blues music educational workshop held in Clarksdale, Mississippi, organized by The Pinetop Perkins Foundation. Professional blues musicians from all over the world teach youths the blues music tradition and instrumentation: guitar, drums, bass, harmonica, piano, and voice. The Pinetop Perkins Foundation, a non-profit organization provides financial assistance to elder blues musicians in the twilight of their careers.

Margolin regularly appears as a featured guest artist at Last Waltz tribute shows. He occasionally makes appearances and records with his sister Sherry, a pianist.

In 2026 Margolin was inducted into the Blues Hall of Fame.

== Discography ==
=== Albums ===
- The Old School (1989)
- Chicago Blues (1991)
- Down in the Alley (1993)
- My Blues & My Guitar (1995)
- Up & In (1997)
- Hold Me To It (1999)
- All-Star Blues Jam (2003) with Carey Bell, Mookie Brill, Jimmy D. Lane, Pinetop Perkins, Willie "Big Eyes" Smith, Hubert Sumlin
- In North Carolina (2007)
- My Road (2016)
- Bob Margolin (2018)
- This Guitar and Tonight (2019)
- Star of Stage and Screens (2020)
- So Far (2022) Bob Margolin & Bob Corritore feat. Jimmy Vivino

With Muddy Waters

- "Unk" in Funk (Chess, 1974)
- The Muddy Waters Woodstock Album (Chess, 1975)
- Hard Again (Blue Sky, 1977)
- I'm Ready (Blue Sky, 1978)
- Muddy "Mississippi" Waters – Live (Blue Sky, 1979)
- King Bee (Blue Sky, 1981)

With Johnny Winter

- Nothin' but the Blues (Blue Sky, 1977)
