= James Madison (musician) =

- Madison at the 1965 Newport Folk Festival

Background information
- Also known as: Pee Wee Madison
- Born: May 4, 1935; Osceola, Arkansas, U.S.
- Died: January 7, 2008 (aged 72) Chicago, Illinois, U.S.
- Genres: Blues
- Occupation: Musician
- Instrument: Guitar

James "Pee Wee" Madison (May 4, 1935 – January 7, 2008) was an American blues guitar player.

== Biography ==
Born in Osceola, Arkansas, he moved to Chicago in the late 1950s, molding his musicianship after that of Little Walter. His big chance came when he joined the band of Muddy Waters in 1963, replacing guitarist Pat Hare who was incarcerated for killing his girlfriend.

Starting in 1964, Madison played on most of Muddy Waters' recordings. He played with Muddy Waters' band until the ending of his world tour in 1973, mostly playing rhythm guitar on an upside-down Fender Mustang.

While traveling through Illinois with Muddy Waters on October 26, 1969, Madison was injured in an automobile accident. He spent two days in the hospital recovering from his injuries. The young couple that collided with the band's vehicle on U.S. Route 45 were both killed in the accident.

Madison died in Chicago on January 7, 2008, aged 72.

== Discography ==
With Muddy Waters

- The Folk Singer (Chess, 1964)
- Muddy, Brass & the Blues (Chess, 1966)
- Live at Mr. Kelly's (Chess, 1971)
- Can't Get No Grindin' (Chess, 1973)

With Otis Spann

- The Blues Never Die! (Prestige, 1965)
