= Pat Hare =

- Hare in 1959

Background information
- Born: Auburn Hare; December 20, 1930; Cherry Valley, Arkansas, U.S.
- Died: September 26, 1980 (aged 49) Saint Paul, Minnesota, U.S.
- Genres: Blues
- Occupations: Musician; songwriter
- Instruments: Guitar; vocals
- Years active: Early 1950s–1963

Auburn "Pat" Hare (December 20, 1930 – September 26, 1980) was an American electric blues guitarist and singer. His heavily distorted, power chord–driven electric guitar performances in the early 1950s is considered an important precursor of heavy metal music. His guitar work with Little Junior's Blue Flames had a major influence on the rockabilly style, and his guitar playing on blues records by artists such as Muddy Waters was influential among 1960s British Invasion blues rock bands such as the Rolling Stones and the Yardbirds.

== Biography ==
Auburn Hare, known as "Pat," was born in Cherry Valley, Arkansas. He recorded at the Sun Studio in Memphis, Tennessee, serving as a sideman for Howlin' Wolf, James Cotton, Muddy Waters, Bobby Bland and other artists. Hare was one of the first guitarists to purposely use the effects of distortion in his playing.

In 1951, he joined a blues band formed by Junior Parker, called Little Junior's Blue Flames. He played the electric guitar solo on "Love My Baby" (1953), which later inspired the rockabilly style. One of their biggest hits was "Next Time You See Me", which in 1957 reached number 5 on the Billboard R&B chart and number 74 on the Billboard Hot 100 pop chart.

His guitar solo on James Cotton's electric blues record "Cotton Crop Blues" (1954) was the first recorded use of heavily distorted power chords, later an element of heavy metal music. According to Robert Palmer, "Rarely has a grittier, nastier, more ferocious electric guitar sound been captured on record, before or since, and Hare's repeated use of a rapid series of two downward-modulating power chords, the second of which is allowed to hang menacingly in the air, is a kind of hook or structural glue. [...] The first heavy metal record? I'd say yes, with tongue only slightly in cheek." The other side of the single was "Hold Me in Your Arms"; both songs "featured a guitar sound so overdriven that with the historical distance of several decades, it now sounds like a direct line to the coarse, distorted tones favored by modern rock players." According to Allmusic, "what is now easily attainable by 16-year-old kids on modern-day effects pedals just by stomping on a switch, Hare was accomplishing with his fingers and turning the volume knob on his Sears & Roebuck cereal-box-sized amp all the way to the right until the speaker was screaming."

Hare was reported to have been introverted when sober (once married to Dorothy Mae Good, with whom he had a son and two daughters), but he had a serious problem with alcohol abuse. Shortly after the "Cotton Crop Blues" recording, he recorded a version of the early 1940s Doctor Clayton song "I'm Gonna Murder My Baby" on May 14, 1954, which has since been released on the 1990 Rhino Records compilation album Blue Flames: A Sun Blues Collection. The record also features power chords, which remains "most fundamental in modern rock" as "the basic structure for riff-building in heavy metal bands." According to Robert Palmer, the song is "as heavy metal as it gets." According to the album liner notes, "I'm Gonna Murder My Baby" is "doubly morbid because he did just that". In December 1963, Hare shot his girlfriend dead in Minneapolis and also shot a policeman who came to investigate. At the time of his arrest, he gave police his occupation as "window washer". He had been fired from the Muddy Waters before moving to Minnesota (replaced in the band by the guitarist James "Pee Wee" Madison). Hare pleaded guilty to murder and spent the last 16 years of his life in prison, where he formed a band named Sounds Incarcerated. He developed lung cancer in prison and died in 1980 in Saint Paul, Minnesota.
