= James Cotton =

American blues harmonica player and singer-songwriter (1935–2017)

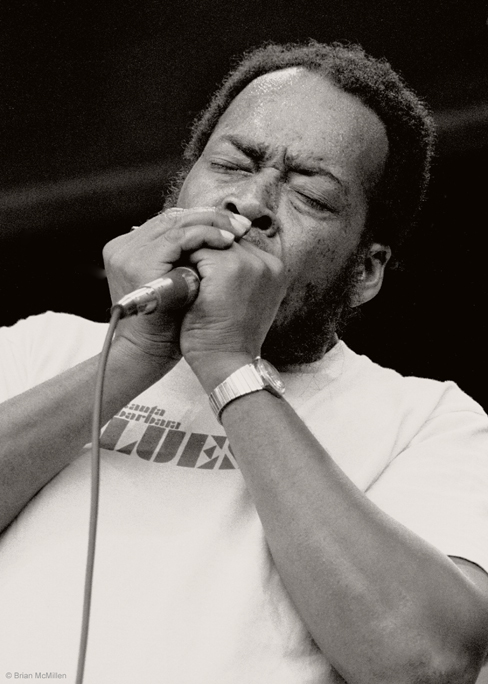
- Cotton in 1981

Background information
- Born: James Henry Cotton; July 1, 1935; Tunica, Mississippi, U.S.
- Died: March 16, 2017 (aged 81) Austin, Texas, U.S.
- Genres: Blues; Chicago blues; Delta blues; electric blues jazz; Memphis blues; rock
- Occupations: Musician; singer; songwriter
- Instruments: Harmonica; vocals; drums
- Years active: 1953–2017
- Labels: Buddah; Alligator; Telarc International
- Website: jamescottonsuperharp.com

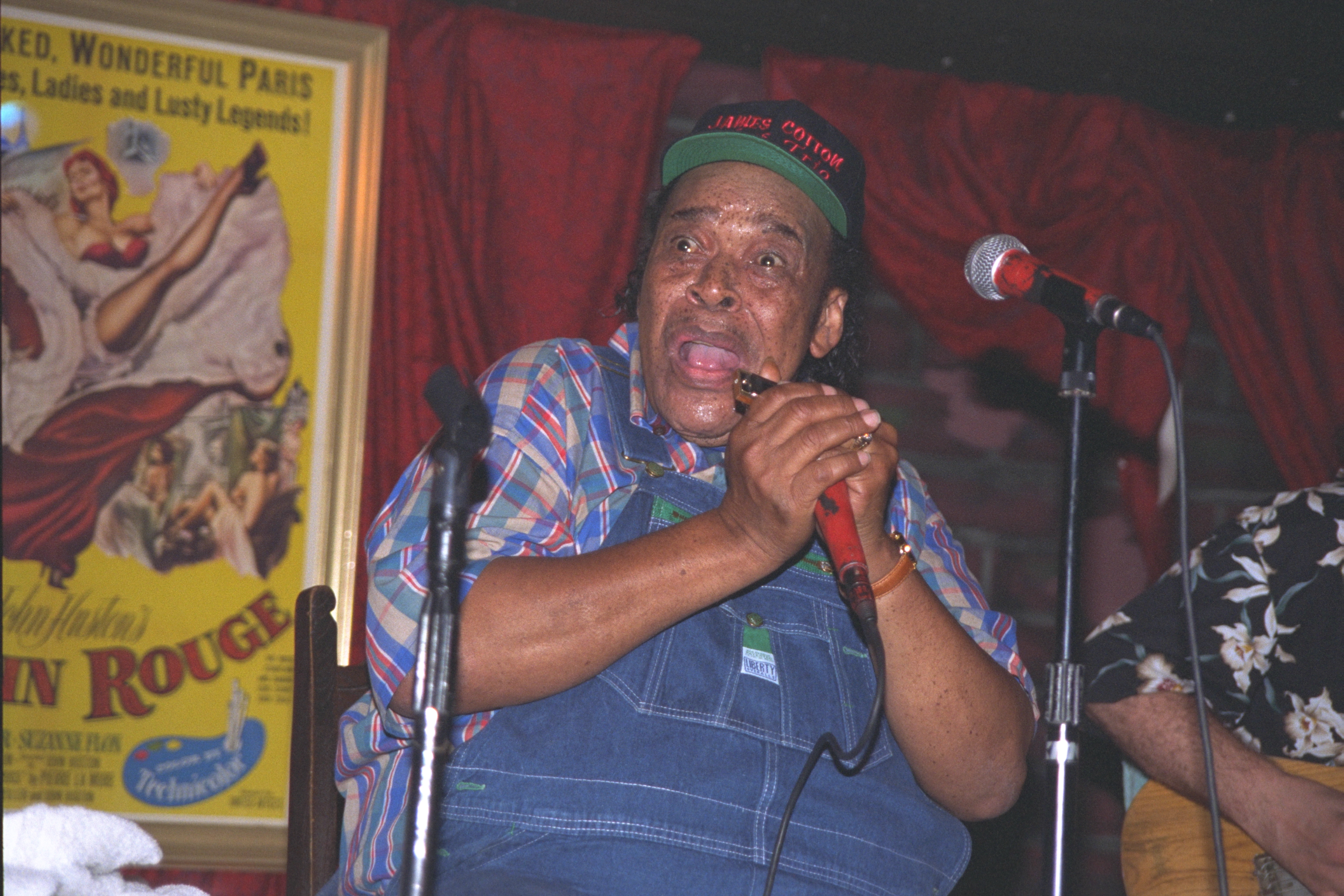
Cotton in Delray Beach, Florida

James Henry Cotton (July 1, 1935 – March 16, 2017) was an American blues harmonica player, singer/songwriter, who performed and recorded with many fellow blues artists, including Howlin' Wolf and Muddy Waters and with his own band, the James Cotton Blues Band.

Cotton began his professional career being mentored by Sonny Boy Williamson II and playing the blues harp in Howlin' Wolf's band in the early 1950s. He spent 12 years touring with Muddy Waters and appeared on At Newport 60, which is considered by Rolling Stone's 500 Greatest Album's of All Times.

He made his first recordings in Memphis for Sun Records, under the direction of Sam Phillips. In 1955, he was recruited by Muddy Waters to come to Chicago and join his band. Cotton became Muddy's bandleader and stayed with the group until 1965. In 1965, he formed the Jimmy Cotton Blues Quartet, with Otis Spann on piano, to record between gigs with the Muddy Waters band. He eventually left to form his own full-time touring group. His first full album, on Verve Records, was produced by the guitarist Mike Bloomfield and the singer and songwriter Nick Gravenites, who later were members of the band Electric Flag.

In the 1970s, Cotton played harmonica on Muddy Waters' Grammy Award–winning 1977 album Hard Again, produced by Johnny Winter.

== Career ==
Cotton was born in Tunica, Mississippi, his parents Hattie and Moses, were sharecroppers and died when he was nine years-old. He became interested in music when he first heard Sonny Boy Williamson II on the radio. He left home with his uncle and moved to West Helena, Arkansas, finding Williamson there. For many years Cotton claimed that he told Williamson that he was an orphan and that Williamson took him in and raised him, a story he admitted in recent years is not true. However, Williamson did mentor Cotton during his early years. Williamson left the South to live with his estranged wife in Milwaukee, Wisconsin, leaving his band in Cotton's hands. Cotton was quoted as saying, "He just gave it to me. But I couldn't hold it together 'cause I was too young and crazy in those days an' everybody in the band was grown men, so much older than me."

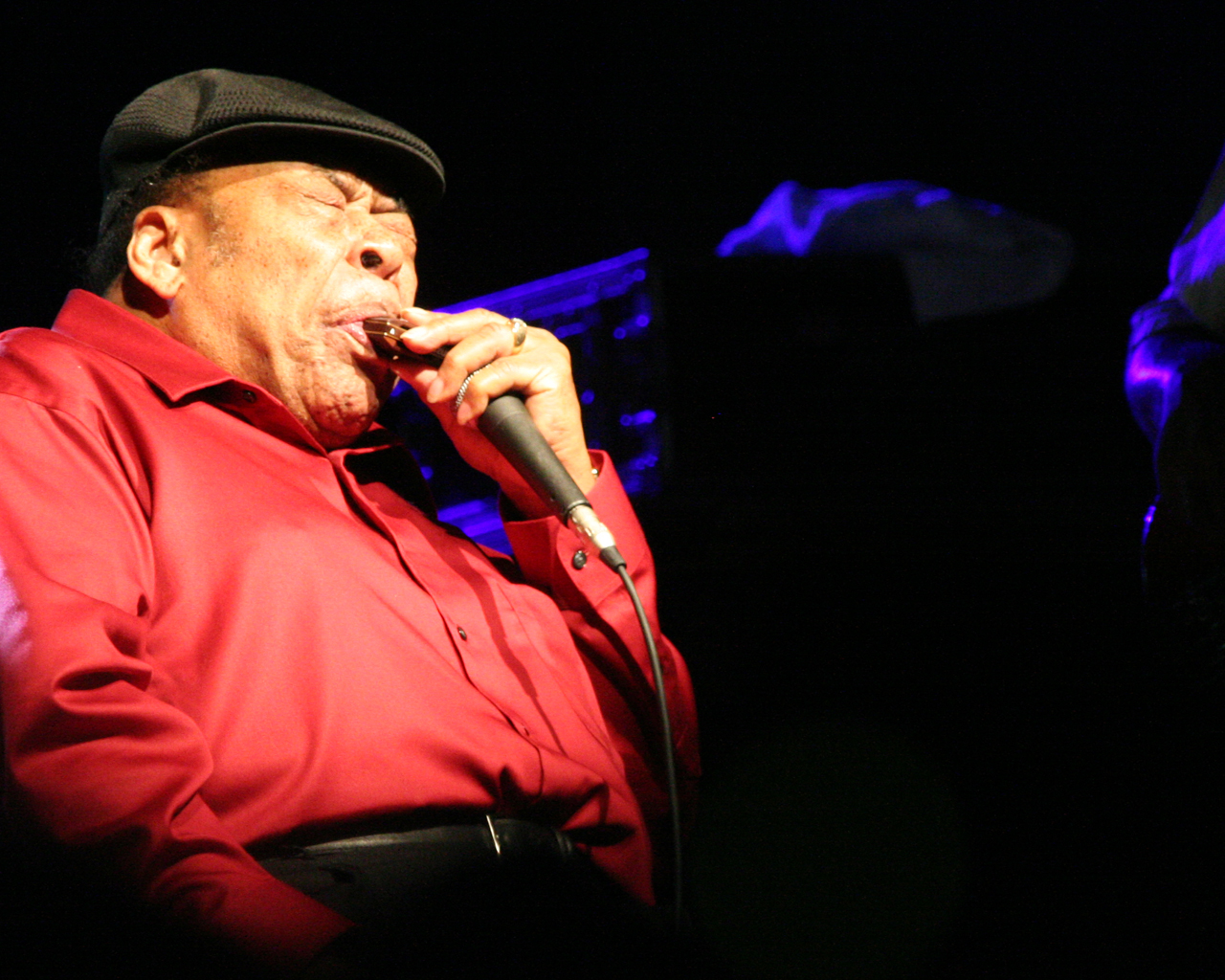
Cotton performing in 2008

Cotton played drums early in his career but is famous for his harmonica playing. He began his professional career playing the blues harp in Howlin' Wolf's band in the early 1950s. He made his first recordings as a solo artist for Sun Records in Memphis in 1953. In 1954, he recorded an electric blues single "Cotton Crop Blues", which featured a heavily distorted power chord–driven electric guitar solo by Pat Hare. Cotton began working with the Muddy Waters Band around 1955. He performed songs such as "Got My Mojo Working" and "She's Nineteen Years Old", although he did not play on the original recordings; Little Walter, Waters's long-time harmonica player, played for most of Waters's recording sessions in the 1950s. Cotton's first recording session with Waters took place in June 1957, and he alternated with Little Walter on Waters's recording sessions until the end of the decade.

In 1965 he formed the Jimmy Cotton Blues Quartet, with Otis Spann on piano, to record between gigs with Waters's band. Their performances were captured by producer Samuel Charters on volume two of the Vanguard recording Chicago/The Blues/Today! After leaving Waters's band in 1966, Cotton toured with Janis Joplin while pursuing a solo career. He formed the James Cotton Blues Band in 1967. The band mainly performed its own arrangements of popular blues and R&B from the 1950s and 1960s. Cotton's band included a horn section, like that of Bobby Bland's. After Bland's death, his son told news media that Bland had recently discovered that Cotton was his half-brother.

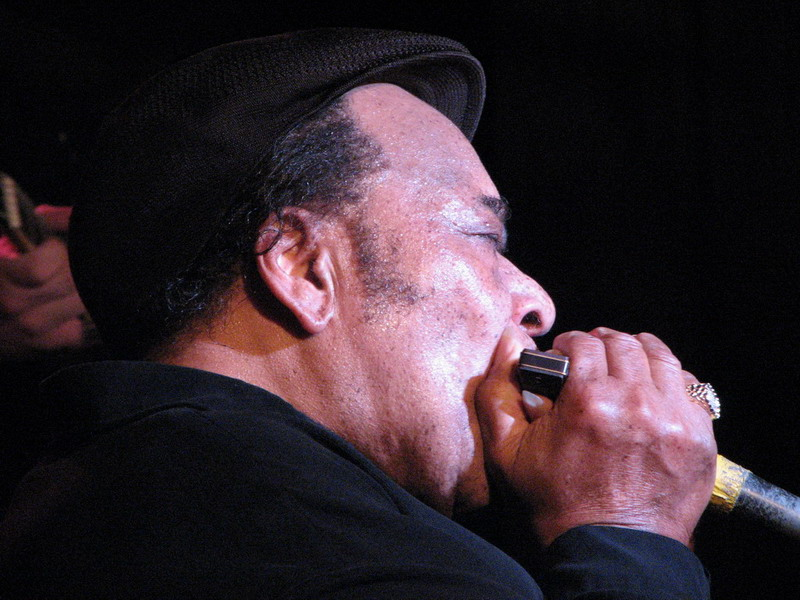
Cotton at Jeff Healey's blues nightclub in Toronto

In the 1970s, Cotton recorded several albums for Buddah Records, including 100% Cotton with Matt "Guitar" Murphy, one of Cotton's best known albums. He played harmonica on Muddy Waters's Grammy Award–winning 1977 album Hard Again, produced by Johnny Winter. In the 1980s he recorded for Alligator Records in Chicago; he rejoined the Alligator roster in 2010. The James Cotton Blues Band received a Grammy nomination in 1984 for Live from Chicago: Mr. Superharp Himself!, on Alligator, and a second for his 1987 album Take Me Back, on Blind Pig Records.

He was awarded a Grammy for Best Traditional Blues Album for Deep in the Blues in 1996, produced by John Snyder. He was also nominated for his albums Living The Blues (1995),Superharps (2001), Baby, Don't You Tear My Clothes (2005), Giant (2010).

Cotton appeared on the cover of the July–August 1987 issue of Living Blues magazine (number 76). He was featured in the same publication's 40th anniversary issue of August–September 2010.

In 2006, Cotton was inducted into the Blues Hall of Fame at a ceremony conducted by the Blues Foundation in Memphis. He has won or shared ten Blues Music Awards.

Cotton battled throat cancer in the mid-1990s, but he continued to tour, using singers or members of his backing band as vocalists. On March 10, 2008, he and Ben Harper performed at the induction of Little Walter into the Rock and Roll Hall of Fame, playing "Juke" and "My Babe" together; the induction ceremony was broadcast nationwide on VH1 Classic. On August 30, 2010, Cotton was the special guest on Larry Monroe's farewell broadcast of Blue Monday, which he had hosted on radio station KUT in Austin, Texas, for nearly 30 years.

Cotton's studio album Giant, released by Alligator Records in late September 2010, was nominated for a Grammy Award. His album Cotton Mouth Man, released by Alligator on May 7, 2013, was also a Grammy nominee. It includes guest appearances by Gregg Allman, Joe Bonamassa, Ruthie Foster, Delbert McClinton, Warren Haynes, Keb Mo, Chuck Leavell and Colin Linden. Cotton played harmonica on "Matches Don't Burn Memories" on the debut album by the Dr. Izzy Band, Blind & Blues Bound, released in June 2013. In 2014, Cotton won a Blues Music Award for Traditional Male Blues Artist and was also nominated in the category Best Instrumentalist – Harmonica.

Cotton's touring band included the guitarist and vocalist Tom Holland, the vocalist Darrell Nulisch, the bassist Noel Neal (brother of the blues guitarist and harmonica player Kenny Neal) and the drummer Jerry Porter.

== Death ==
Cotton died of pneumonia on March 16, 2017, at the age of 81, at a medical center in Austin, Texas, and was buried on July 11, 2017, in Texas State Cemetery in Austin.

== Musical company ==
Cotton worked with many prominent artists, including:

- Gregg Allman
- William "Billy Boy" Arnold
- Elvin Bishop
- Mike Bloomfield
- Joe Bonamassa
- Paul Butterfield
- Grateful Dead
- Pat Hare
- Howlin' Wolf
- Janis Joplin
- B.B. King
- Freddie King
- Alexis Korner
- Delbert McClinton
- Steve Miller
- Matt "Guitar" Murphy
- Charlie Musselwhite
- Quicksilver Messenger Service
- Keith Richards
- Todd Rundgren
- Santana
- Willie "Big Eyes" Smith
- Otis Spann
- Taj Mahal
- Big Mama Thornton
- Jimmie Vaughan
- Joe Louis Walker
- Muddy Waters
- Sonny Boy Williamson
- Johnny Winter

== Discography ==
- 1965: Chris Barber Presents Jimmy Cotton, and
- 1965: Chris Barber Presents Jimmy Cotton – No. 2 (two 45 rpm EPs recorded with Barber's British jazz and blues band)
- 1966: Chicago/The Blues/Today!, Vol. 2 (Vanguard) split album with Otis Rush, and Homesick James.
- 1967: Seems Like Yesterday (Live at the New Penelope Café, Montreal, Canada) (Just A Memory/Justin Time JAM-9138) released 1998
- 1967: Late Night Blues: Live at the New Penelope Café 1967 (Just A Memory/Justin Time JAM-9140) released 1998
- 1967: The James Cotton Blues Band (Verve) (No. 194 US)
- 1968: Cut You Loose! (Vanguard)
- 1968: Pure Cotton (Verve)
- 1968: Cotton in Your Ears (Verve) released 1969
- 1970: Taking Care of Business (Capitol)
- 1974: 100% Cotton, with Matt "Guitar" Murphy (Buddah)
- 1975: High Energy, with Matt "Guitar" Murphy (Buddah)
- 1976: Live & On the Move, with Matt "Guitar" Murphy (Buddah)
- 1977: Breakin' It Up, Breakin' It Down, with Muddy Waters, and Johnny Winter (Epic/Legacy) released 2007
- 1982: Two Sides of the Blues (Quicksilver)
- 1984: High Compression (Alligator)
- 1986: Live from Chicago: Mr. Superharp Himself (Alligator)
- 1987: Take Me Back (Blind Pig), reissued on vinyl in 2009
- 1988: Recorded Live at Antone's Night Club (Antone's)
- 1990: Harp Attack!, with Junior Wells, Carey Bell, and Billy Branch (Alligator)
- 1990: Mystery Train (Rounder) split album with Junior Parker, and Pat Hare.
- 1991: Mighty Long Time (Antone's)
- 1993: 3 Harp Boogie (Tomato) reissue of Two Sides of the Blues.
- 1994: Living the Blues (Verve)
- 1995: Best of the Verve Years (Verve) compilation of The James Cotton Blues Band, Pure Cotton, and Cotton in Your Ears.
- 1996: Deep in the Blues (Verve)
- 1999: Best of the Vanguard Years (Vanguard) compilation of Chicago/The Blues/Today!, Vol. 2, and Cut You Loose!.
- 1999: Superharps, with Billy Branch, Charlie Musselwhite, and Sugar Ray Norcia (Telarc)
- 2000: Fire Down Under the Hill (Telarc)
- 2002: 35th Anniversary Jam of the James Cotton Blues Band (Telarc)
- 2004: Baby, Don't You Tear My Clothes (Telarc)
- 2010: Giant (Alligator)
- 2013: Cotton Mouth Man (Alligator)

With Muddy Waters

- Muddy Waters Sings "Big Bill" (Chess, 1960)
- At Newport 1960 (Chess, 1960)
- Muddy, Brass & the Blues (Chess, 1966)
- Live at Mr. Kelly's (Chess, 1971)
- Can't Get No Grindin' (Chess, 1973)
- Hard Again (Blue Sky, 1977)
- Muddy "Mississippi" Waters – Live (Blue Sky, 1979)
- King Bee (Blue Sky, 1981)

With Otis Spann

- The Blues Never Die! (Prestige, 1964 [1965])
- Otis Spann's Chicago Blues (Testament, 1966)

With Johnny Winter

- Nothin' but the Blues (Blue Sky, 1977)

== See also ==
- Chicago Blues Festival
