= Hard Again =

Studio album by Muddy Waters
- Released: January 10, 1977
- Recorded: October 1976
- Genre: Chicago blues
- Length: 45:47
- Label: Blue Sky
- Producer: Johnny Winter

Muddy Waters chronology
The Muddy Waters Woodstock Album (1975)	Hard Again (1977)	I'm Ready (1978)

Hard Again is a studio album by American blues singer Muddy Waters. Released on January 10, 1977, it was the first of his albums produced by Johnny Winter. Hard Again was Waters's first album on Blue Sky Records after leaving Chess Records and was well received by critics.

== Background ==
In August 1975, Chess Records was sold to All Platinum Records and became a reissue label only. Waters left sometime after this, and did not record any new studio material until he signed with Johnny Winter's Blue Sky label in October 1976.

== Recording ==
Hard Again was recorded in three days. Producing the session was Johnny Winter and engineering the sessions was Dave Still – who previously engineered Johnny's brother Edgar, Foghat, and Alan Merrill. Waters used his touring band of the time, consisting of guitarist Bob Margolin, pianist Pinetop Perkins, and drummer Willie "Big Eyes" Smith. Other backing members during the sessions were harmonicist James Cotton and bassist Charles Calmese, who performed with both Johnny Winter and James Cotton in the past.

== Songs ==
Three of the songs on the album – "Mannish Boy", "I Want to Be Loved", and "I Can't Be Satisfied" – were re-recordings of songs that were previously recorded for Chess Records. One song, "The Blues Had a Baby and They Named It Rock and Roll, Pt. 2", was co-written with Brownie McGhee and another song, "Bus Driver", was co-written with Terry Abrahamson.

An outtake from the recording sessions, "Walking Through the Park", appeared on the 2004 Legacy Recordings reissue CD, while several more unused tracks appeared on King Bee in 1981.

== Reception ==
Professional ratings
Review scores
Source	Rating
AllMusic	5/5 stars
Blender	4/5 stars
Christgau's Record Guide	A−
DownBeat	4/5 stars
The Penguin Guide to Blues Recordings	3.5/4 stars
Q	4/5 stars
The Rolling Stone Album Guide	4/5 stars
The Village Voice	A

The album was well received by music critics. John Quaintance of Yahoo! Music called it "a remarkable album" and a "return to form" for Muddy Waters, commenting that "Johnny Winter, ... James Cotton, Pinetop Perkins, Bob Margolin, Charles Calmese and Willie "Big Eyes" Smith are all thrilled to be in the same room with Muddy, and it shows, as they lay down a serious foundation for the old master who struts and brags like it's 1950 again." Q called it "a guaranteed delight" for "students of the post-war blues", while DownBeat stated, "Singing, [Muddy is] playful and proud, brawny and insistent, his free-flow of inspiration spreading to his superlative road band". Dan Oppenheimer of Rolling Stone said that "Mannish Boy" sounded like it was recorded live, while both Oppenheimer and Daniel Gioffre of AllMusic state how powerful Willie "Big Eyes" Smith's drumming is. Oppenheimer and Gioffre both share the opinion that Hard Again is Muddy Waters comeback album. In The New Rolling Stone Album Guide (2004), Rolling Stone journalist Dave Marsh said "Johnny Winter provided the sensitive production touch otherwise lacking on some of [Muddy's] early '70s recordings."

In his consumer guide for The Village Voice, Robert Christgau attributed the record's intense quality to "the natural enthusiasm of an inspired collaboration", and remarked on its standing in Chicago blues, "except maybe for B.B. King's Live at the Regal and Otis Spann's Walking the Blues (oh, there must be others, but let me go on) I can't recall a better blues album than this." In a later review for Blender, the critic found Muddy Waters to be in "virile voice" and commented that "all-star musicians and fresh prospects stimulate the excitement promised in the title."

== Charts and awards ==
Hard Again peaked at No. 143 on the Billboard 200, which was his first appearance on the chart since Fathers and Sons in 1969. The album won the Grammy Award for Best Ethnic or Traditional Folk Recording the year of its release.

== Track listing ==
All tracks are composed by Muddy Waters (listed as McKinley Morganfield), except where noted.

Side one
No.	Title	Writer(s)	Length
1.	"Mannish Boy"	Morganfield, Ellas McDaniel, Mel London	5:23
2.	"Bus Driver"	Morganfield, Terry Abrahamson	7:44
3.	"I Want to Be Loved"	Willie Dixon	2:20
4.	"Jealous Hearted Man"		4:23
5.	"I Can't Be Satisfied"		3:28

Side two
No.	Title	Writer(s)	Length
1.	"The Blues Had a Baby and They Named It Rock and Roll, Pt. 2"	Morganfield, Brownie McGhee	3:35
2.	"Deep Down in Florida"		5:25
3.	"Crosseyed Cat"		5:59
4.	"Little Girl"		7:06

2004 Epic CD reissue extra track
No.	Title	Length
10.	"Walking Through the Park"	3:55
Total length:		49:42

== Personnel ==
Musicians

- Muddy Waters – vocals, guitar
- Johnny Winter – guitar, producer, miscellaneous screams
- Bob Margolin – guitar
- Charles Calmese – bass guitar
- Pinetop Perkins – piano
- James Cotton – harmonica
- Willie "Big Eyes" Smith – drums

Technical

- Dave Still – engineer
- Andy Manganello – assistant engineer
- Joseph M. Palmaccio – mastering
- Al Quaglieri – reissue producer
- Chris Theis – mix engineer

== Release history ==
Region	Date	Label	Format	Catalog
U.S.	January 10, 1977	Blue Sky	LP	PZ 34449
U.K.	1977	Blue Sky	LP	SKY 32357
Europe	1977	Blue Sky	LP	SKY 81853
Australia	1977	CBS	LP	SBP 234953
U.S.	1987	Blue Sky	CD	ZK 34449
U.S.	1987	Blue Sky	Cassette	PZT 34449
U.S.	2004	Epic/Legacy	CD	EK 86817
Europe	2004	Epic/Legacy	CD	EPC 515161 2
