= Willie "Big Eyes" Smith =

American blues vocalist, harmonica player and drummer (1936–2011)

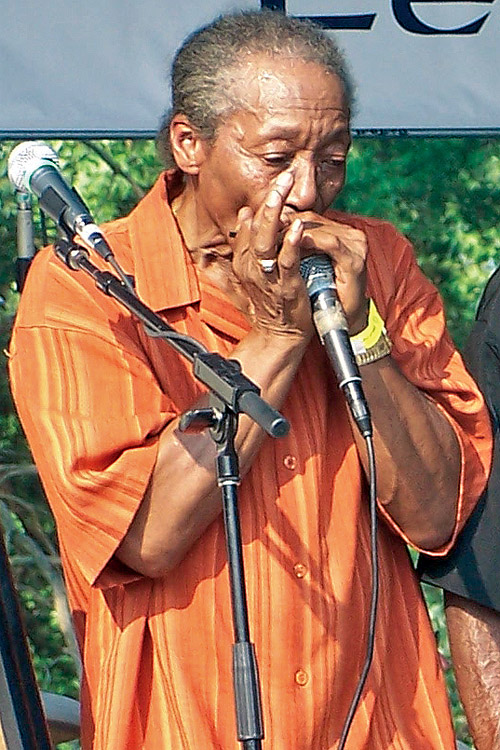
- Smith at the 2008 Master Musicians Festival

Background information
- Born: Willie Lee Smith; January 19, 1936; Helena, Arkansas, U.S.
- Died: September 16, 2011 (aged 75) Chicago, Illinois, U.S.
- Genres: Blues
- Occupations: Singer, musician, bandleader, composer
- Instruments: Harmonica, drums
- Years active: 1954–2011
- Labels: Rounder, Hightone, Electro-Fi, Telarc, Big Eyes
- Website: williebigeyessmith.com

Willie Lee "Big Eyes" Smith (January 19, 1936 – September 16, 2011) was an American electric blues vocalist, harmonica player, and drummer. He was best known for several stints with the Muddy Waters band beginning in the early 1960s.

== Biography ==
Born in Helena, Arkansas, Smith learned to play harp at age 17 after moving to Chicago, Illinois. He became a musician during the 1950s. In 1955, Smith joined Bo Diddley with "Diddy Wah Diddy" for the Checker label as a harmonicaist. He starting playing with Muddy Waters after becoming a drummer. He was a part of Muddy Waters Sings Big Bill Broonzy.

In 1961, Smith became a regular member of Muddy Waters' band. He remained a permanent member until 1980 apart from a break during the 1960s. All of Muddy's Grammy Award winning albums (Hard Again, I'm Ready, They Call Me Muddy Waters, Muddy "Mississippi" Waters Live, The London Muddy Waters Session, and The Muddy Waters Woodstock Album were released between 1971 and 1979 during Smith's tenure with the band.)

The Legendary Blues Band was co-founded by Smith during 1980. Smith had recorded with Eric Clapton in the 1964 Otis Spann recording of "Pretty Girls Everywhere".

Smith's 2008 album Born in Arkansas utilized bassman Bob Stroger, pianist Barrelhouse Chuck, guitarist Billy Flynn, guitarist Little Frank Krakowski (who has worked with Smith for years) and his son and drummer, Kenny "Beedy Eyes" Smith. In June 2010, Smith released Joined at the Hip with Pinetop Perkins. Joining these two in the studio were Stroger, and his son Kenny Smith on drums. John Primer, who was another Muddy Waters band alumnus, joined on lead guitar along with Frank Krakowski.

On February 13, 2011, Smith won a Grammy Award for Best Traditional Blues Album for Joined at the Hip, an album he recorded with Pinetop Perkins. He remained active in his final year of life, encouraging Liz Mandeville to start her own record label (Blue Kitty Music) and he was featured on two tracks of her album, Clarksdale that was released in 2012.

== Death ==
Smith died in Chicago following a stroke on September 16, 2011.

== The Blues Foundation Awards ==
Blues Music Awards
Year	Category	Result
2011	Traditional Blues Album of the Year - Joined at the Hip (with Pinetop Perkins)	Winner
2009	Instrumentalist - Drums	Winner
2008	Instrumentalist - Drums	Winner
2007	Instrumentalist - Drums	Winner
2006	Instrumentalist - Drums	Winner
2005	Instrumentalist - Drums	Winner
2004	Blues Instrumentalist - Drums	Winner
2003	Blues Instrumentalist - Drums	Winner
2002	Blues Instrumentalist - Drums	Winner
1999	Blues Instrumentalist - Drums	Winner
1998	Blues Instrumentalist - Drums	Winner
1997	Blues Instrumentalist - Drums	Winner
1996	Blues Instrumentalist - Drums	Winner

== Selective discography ==
=== As bandleader ===
2012	Live Blues Protected by Smith & Wilson (with Roger "Hurricane" Wilson)	Blues (acoustic)	Blue Storm
2010	Joined at the Hip (with Pinetop Perkins)	Blues	Telarc
2008	Born in Arkansas	Blues	Big Eyes Records
2006	Way Back	Blues	Hightone
2004	Bluesin' It	Blues	Electro-Fi
2000	Blues from the Heart	Blues	Juke Joint
1999	Nothin' but the Blues Y'all	Blues	Juke Joint
1995	Bag Full of Blues	Blues	Blind Pig

=== Legendary Blues Band ===
Year	Title	Genre	Label
1993	Money Talks	Blues	Wild Dog Blues
1992	Prime Time Blues	Blues	Wild Dog Blues
1991	U B da Judge	Blues	Ichiban
1990	Keepin' the Blues Alive	Blues	Ichiban
1989	Woke Up with the Blues	Blues	Ichiban
1983	Red Hot 'n' Blue	Blues	Rounder
1981	Life of Ease	Blues	Rounder

=== With other artists ===
Year	Title	Artist	Label
1964	The Blues of Otis Spann	Otis Spann	Decca
1966	Muddy, Brass & the Blues	Muddy Waters	Chess
1971	Live at Mr. Kelly's	Muddy Waters	Chess
1973	Last Night	Carey Bell	BluesWay
1973	Can't Get No Grindin'	Muddy Waters	Chess
1974	"Unk" in Funk	Muddy Waters	Chess
1977	Hard Again	Muddy Waters	Blue Sky
1977	Nothin' but the Blues	Johnny Winter	Blue Sky
1978	I'm Ready	Muddy Waters	Blue Sky
1979	Muddy "Mississippi" Waters – Live	Muddy Waters	Blue Sky
1981	King Bee	Muddy Waters	Blue Sky
1997	Born in the Delta	Pinetop Perkins	Telarc
2007	Breakin' It Up, Breakin' It Down	Muddy Waters, Johnny Winter, James Cotton	Epic
2010	Live! in Chicago	Kenny Wayne Shepherd Band	Roadrunner
