= Jerry Portnoy =

American harmonica blues musician (born 1943)

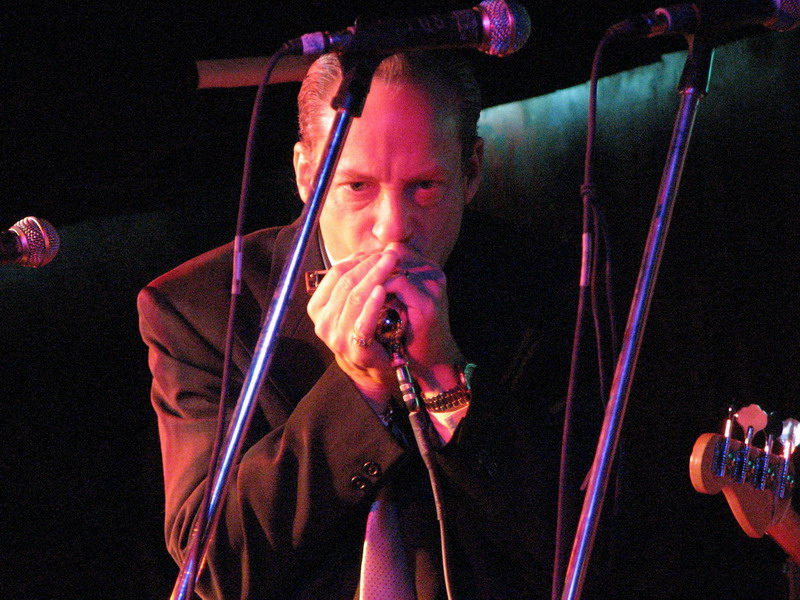
- Jerry Portnoy at Silver Dollar Room, Toronto, Ontario, Canada

Background information
- Born: November 25, 1943 (age 82); Evanston, Illinois, United States
- Genres: Blues, Jazz
- Occupations: Singer-songwriter, harmonicist
- Instruments: Harmonica, vocals
- Years active: Late 1970s–present

Jerry Portnoy (born November 25, 1943, in Evanston, Illinois, United States) is an American harmonica blues musician, who has toured with Muddy Waters and Eric Clapton.

== Biography ==
Portnoy grew up in Chicago. He first heard the blues played outside his father's carpet store in the Maxwell Street market in the late 1940s and early 1950s. Maxwell Street was a mecca for blues musicians, who would play on the street for tips. Little Walter, Jimmy Rogers, Johnny "Man" Young, Big Walter Horton and many others all played on Maxwell Street.

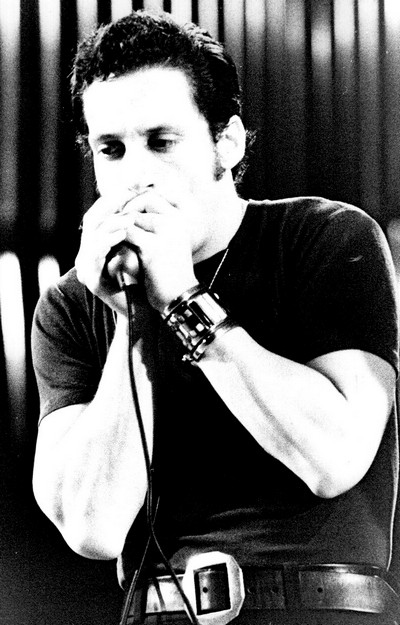
Jerry Portnoy in Paris, France; November 7, 1976

Portnoy began to perform professionally in 1970, touring the Midwest with the band of Johnny "Man" Young (guitar/mandolin). Two years later, he left Johnny Young, but continued to perform around the Midwest in the bands of guitarist Johnny Littlejohn and, later, drummer Sam Lay. For a time, he was also a member of the house band at the Checkerboard Lounge. He joined the Muddy Waters Blues Band in May 1974 and appeared on the albums I'm Ready, Muddy 'Mississippi' Waters Live, and King Bee. He remained until June 1980 when he and other members of Waters' band (pianist Pinetop Perkins, drummer Willie "Big Eyes" Smith and bassist Calvin "Fuzz" Jones) formed The Legendary Blues Band, where he remained until 1986.

Life of Ease was released in 1981 and Red Hot and Blue two years later. After a brief hiatus from touring and the music business, he returned to music in 1987 when Ronnie Earl asked him to help start a band which became the Broadcasters. He formed his own band, called the Streamliners, in 1989. They released the CD Poison Kisses in 1991 (later re-issued as Home Run Hitter with three extra tracks). That same year Eric Clapton invited Portnoy to join an all-star blues band for the six blues shows at London's Royal Albert Hall as part of Clapton's 24-night stand. In 1993, he joined Clapton's band and remained with it through 1996. During this time, the band recorded Clapton's blues album From the Cradle.

Portnoy has performed in twenty-eight foreign countries on six continents, including performances at the White House, Carnegie Hall, Radio City Music Hall, the Smithsonian, the Newport Jazz Festival and other major jazz and blues festivals worldwide. He was a Grammy Award nominee in 1996 for his work with the Muddy Waters Tribute Band on their recording You're Gonna Miss Me When I'm Dead and Gone, and released an instructional package, Jerry Portnoy's Blues Harmonica Masterclass, in 1997. In 2001, he released his second solo album, Down in the Mood Room.

Known for his dark, amplified tone, he has long been a favorite of both critics and peers. The New York Times (1987) said, "Mr. Portnoy crests like an alto saxophone." Down Beat Magazine (2002) said, "Portnoy has few equals as a harmonica player, blues or otherwise." Rick Estrin, a leading professional player as well, was quoted in Blues Revue (2002) as saying, "He can get so much sound out of that harp — such a beautiful, just enormous, fat, rich tone." In 2004, Portnoy appeared on the album, Me and Mr. Johnson, with Eric Clapton.

His autobiography/memoir Dancing with Muddy: Muddy Waters, Eric Clapton, and My Lucky Life In and Out of the Blues was published by Chicago Review Press in 2025.

He currently has available an online harmonica playing tutorial.

== See also ==
- Chicago Blues Festival
