= Buddy Guy discography =

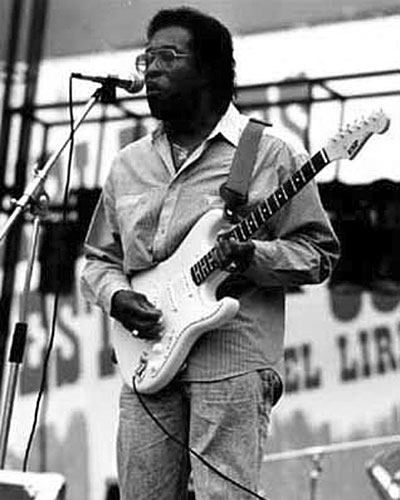
- Guy playing live at Liri Blues Festival 1989
- Studio albums: 20
- EPs: 4
- Live albums: 15
- Compilation albums: 23
- Tribute albums: 1
- Singles: 34
- Music videos: 2
- Concert films: 7
- Solo and collaboration works are counted.

This is the discography of American blues guitarist and singer Buddy Guy.

== Solo ==
=== Singles & EPs ===
Title	Year	Label	Notes	Album	
"Sit and Cry (the Blues)" / "Try to Quit You Baby"	1958	Artistic			
"You Sure Can't Do" / "This Is The End"	1959	Artistic	Ike Turner played guitar on both tracks and composed "This Is The End"		
"I Got My Eyes on You" / "First Time I Met the Blues"	1960	Chess			
"Slop Around" / "Broken Hearted Blues"	1960	Chess			
"Let Me Love You Baby" / "Ten Years Ago"	1961	Chess			
"Stone Crazy" / "Skippin!"	1962	Chess			
"When My Left Eye Jumps" / "The Treasure Untold"	1962	Chess			
"Hard But It's Fair" / "No Lie"	1963	Chess			
"I Dig Your Wig" / "Scraping"	1964	Chess			
"My Time After While" / "I Dig Your Wig"	1964	Chess			
Crazy Music	1965	Chess	UK 7" EP track listing: "Crazy Music" / "Leave My Baby Alone" / "Every Girl I See" / "Too Many Ways"		
"Leave My Girl Alone" / "Crazy Love"	1965	Chess			
"My Mother" / "Mother-In-Law Blues"	1966	Chess			
"I Suffer with the Blues" / "I'm Gonna Keep It To Myself"	1967	Chess			
"Mary Had a Little Lamb" / "Sweet Little Angel"	1968	Vanguard			A Man and the Blues
"Buddy's Groove" / "She Suits Me to a Tee"	1969	Chess			
"A Man of Many Words" / "Honey Dripper"	1972	Atlantic			
"Damn Right, I've Got the Blues" / "Doin' What I Like Best"	1991	Silvertone		Damn Right, I've Got the Blues	
"Where Is The Next One Coming From?" / "Let Me Love You Baby"	1991	Silvertone		Damn Right, I've Got the Blues	
"This Is the End" / "I Hope You Come Back Home"	1992	Jewel			
"I Go Crazy" / "Feels Like Rain"	1993	Silvertone		Feels Like Rain	
"Please Don't Drive Me Away" / "A Man of Many Words"	1995	Silvertone		Slippin' In	
"Talk to Me Baby"	1996	Silvertone		Live: The Real Deal	
"Meet Me in Chicago"	2013	RCA		Rhythm & Blues	
"Born to Play Guitar"	2015	RCA		Born to Play Guitar	
"Thick Like Mississippi Mud"	2015	RCA		Born to Play Guitar	
"Sick with Love" / "She Got it Together"	2017	RCA		Born to Play Guitar	
"You Sure Can't Do" / "Sit and Cry"		Jewel			
"The Way You Been Treating Me" / "This Is the End"		Jewel			

=== Albums ===
==== Studio albums ====
Title	Year	Label	Recording year	Notes
Left My Blues in San Francisco	1967	Chess	1965-67	
A Man and the Blues	1968	Vanguard	1968	Also released as The Blues To-Day.
Hold That Plane!	1972	Vanguard	1969	
The Blues Giant	1979	Isabel	1979	The album was re-released in 1981 by Alligator Records as Stone Crazy! (AL-4723).
Breaking Out	1980	JSP	1980	
DJ Play My Blues	1982	JSP	1981	
Damn Right, I've Got the Blues	1991	Silvertone	1991	Won the 1992 Grammy Award for Best Contemporary Blues Album.
Feels Like Rain	1993	Silvertone		Won the 1994 Grammy Award for Best Contemporary Blues Album.
Slippin' In	1994	Silvertone		Won the 1996 Grammy Award for Best Contemporary Blues Album.
Heavy Love	1998	Silvertone		
Sweet Tea	2001	Silvertone		Nominated for the 2001 Grammy Award for Best Contemporary Blues Album.
Blues Singer	2003	Silvertone		Won the 2004 Grammy Award for Best Traditional Blues Album.
Bring 'Em In	2005	Silvertone		
Skin Deep	2008	Silvertone		
Living Proof	2010	Silvertone		Won the 2011 Grammy Award for Best Contemporary Blues Album.
Rhythm & Blues	2013	Silvertone/RCA		
Born to Play Guitar	2015	Silvertone/RCA		Won the 2016 Grammy Award for Best Blues Album.
The Blues Is Alive and Well	2018	Silvertone/RCA		
The Blues Don't Lie	2022	Silvertone/RCA		
Ain't Done with the Blues	2025	RCA Records	2025	

==== Live albums ====
Title	Year	Label	Recording year	Notes
This Is Buddy Guy!	1968	Vanguard	1968	Recorded at New Orleans House: Berkeley, California.
The Dollar Done Fell	1980	JSP	1979	Re-released in 1988 as Live at the Checkerboard Lounge, Chicago 1979.
Live: The Real Deal	1996	Silvertone	1996	Recorded live at Buddy Guy's Legends, Chicago, IL, and the Irving Plaza, New York, NY. The album was re-released in 2006 by Sony Music.
Jammin’ Blues Electric & Acoustic	2003	BMG	1993/1996	Compilation of tracks from Live: The Real Deal and Last Time Around: Live at Legends.
Live at Legends	2012	Silvertone	2010	Tracks 1 to 8 recorded live at Buddy Guy's Legends, Chicago, IL, January 29 & 30, 2010. Tracks 9 to 11 recorded at Blackbird Studios, Nashville TN, March 9, 2010.
I'll Play the Blues for You	2016	Klondike	1992	Remastered WHCN-FM broadcast of Buddy Guy live from The Sting in Connecticut on 9 January 1992.

==== Compilations ====
Title	Year	Label	Recording year	Notes
First Time I Met the Blues	1969	Python		
In the Beginning	1969	Red Lightnin	1958-64	
I Was Walking Through the Woods	1970	Chess	1960-64	
Hot & Cool	1977	Vanguard	1968-72	
Got to Use Your Head	1978	Blues Ball	1960-66	
Chess Masters	1981	Chess		Re-released 1984 as Buddy Guy.
Ten Blue Fingers	1985	JSP	1980-81	Compilation of tracks from Breaking Out and DJ Play My Blues.
My Time After Awhile	1992	Vanguard	1965-72	
The Very Best of Buddy Guy	1992	Rhino		
The Complete Chess Studio Recordings	1992	Chess	1960-67	
Southern Blues 1957–63	1994	Paula	1957-63	
Buddy's Blues	1997	Chess	1960-67	released in the "Chess Masters" series.
Blues Master	1997	Vanguard		
Buddy's Blues 1978–1982: The Best of the JSP Recordings	1998	JSP	1978-82	
As Good As It Gets	1998	Vanguard	1965-72	
Buddy's Baddest: The Best of Buddy Guy	1999	Silvertone		
The Complete Vanguard Recordings	2000	Vanguard	1968-72	
20th Century Masters – The Millennium Collection: The Best of Buddy Guy	2001	Chess		The album was re-released by Geffen Records in 2011 as Icon.
Best of the Silvertone Years 1991–2005	2005	Silvertone	1991-2005	
Can't Quit the Blues [3-CD + 1-DVD box set]	2006	Silvertone		
Vanguard Visionaries	2007	Vanguard		
Playlist: The Very Best of Buddy Guy	2009	Silvertone	1991-2008	
The Definitive Buddy Guy	2009	Shout! Factory		His first single-disc career-spanning CD.
Blues Greats: Buddy Guy	2011	Geffen		

=== Concert films ===
Title	Year	Label	Recording year
Live: The Real Deal	1996	Silvertone	1996
Teachin' the Blues	2005	Hot Licks	
At Glastonbury	2008	BBC	2008
Listen to This: A Musical Documentary	2013	IMV/Blueline	1991

== Collaborations ==
=== Singles & EPs ===
Title and artist(s)	Year	Label	Notes	Album
With the Blues by Eddie Boyd & Buddy Guy	1965	Chess	UK 7" EP track Listing: "First Time I Met the Blues" / "Ten Years Ago" / "Third Degree" / "Twenty-Four Hours" (First two songs are Buddy Guy recordings; The other two songs are Eddie Boyd recordings)	
Blues with a Beat by Junior Wells	1965	Delmark	EP track Listing: "Hoodoo Man Blues" / "Early in the Morning" / "Snatch It Back and Hold It" / "Ships on the Ocean"	
"A Man of Many Words" / "Honey Dripper" by Buddy Guy with Dr. John & Eric Clapton / by Buddy Guy with The J. Geils Band	1972	ATCO		
"Mustang Sally" by Buddy Guy with Jeff Beck	1991	Silvertone		Damn Right, I've Got the Blues
"Some Kind of Wonderful" / "Too Broke to Spend the Night" by Buddy Guy feat. Paul Rodgers	1993	Silvertone		Feels Like Rain
Midnight Train by Buddy Guy feat. Jonny Lang	1998	Silvertone	EP Track listing: "Midnight Train" / "Had a Bad Night" / "Nobody Understands Me But My Guitar" / "Midnight Train"	Heavy Love
"Stay Around a Little Longer" by Buddy Guy feat. B.B. King	2010	Sony		Living Proof
"Good Things" / "You Can't Love Me" by Buddy Guy & Jesse Fortune / by T.V. Slim		Paula		
"Too Many Cooks" / "Heavy Heart Beat" by Buddy Guy / by Jesse Fortune	1963	Jewel		

=== Albums ===
==== Studio albums ====
Title and artist(s)	Year	Label	Recording year	Notes
Hoodoo Man Blues by Junior Wells' Chicago Blues Band	1965	Delmark	1965	
Chicago / The Blues / Today!, Vol. 1 by Various Artists	1966	Vanguard	1966	
It’s My Life, Baby! by Junior Wells	1966	Vanguard	1966	Parts of the album were recorded live at Pepper's Lounge
Coming at You by Junior Wells	1968	Vanguard	1968	
Buddy and the Juniors by Buddy Guy, Junior Mance & Junior Wells	1970	Blue Thumb	1969	
Southside Blues Jam by Junior Wells	1970	Delmark	1969-70	
Southside Reunion by Memphis Slim	1971	Blue Star	1970	
Play the Blues by Buddy Guy & Junior Wells	1972	Atlantic	1970-72	
Pleading the Blues by Junior Wells	1979	Isabel	1979	
Buddy & Phil by Buddy Guy & Phil Guy	1981	JSP	1979-80	Parts of the album were recorded live at the Checkerboard Lounge
Going Back by Buddy Guy & Junior Wells	1981	Isabel	1981	The album was re-released, with five additional tracks, in 1991 by Alligator Records as Alone & Acoustic, and remastered in 2006 by Pure Pleasure Records as Going Back to Acoustic.
The Red Hot Blues of Phil Guy by Phil Guy	1982	JSP	1982	
Bad Luck Boy by Phil Guy	1983	JSP	1982	
Better Off with the Blues by Junior Wells	1993	Telarc	1993	
All Star Chicago Blues Session by Phil Guy	1994	JSP	1982	
He's My Blues Brother by Phil Guy	2006	Black-Eyed		

==== Live albums ====
Title and artist(s)	Year	Label	Recording year	Notes
Folk Festival of the Blues by Muddy Waters, Buddy Guy, Howlin' Wolf, Sonny Boy Williamson II	1963	Argo		
Live Recording at Yuhbin-Chokin Hall by Junior Wells & Buddy Guy	1975	Bourbon	1975	
Live in Montreux by Buddy Guy & Junior Wells	1978	Black & Blue	1978	Re-released in 1999 as Everything Gonna Be Alright
Drinkin’ TNT ’n’ Smokin’ Dynamite by Buddy Guy & Junior Wells	1982	Blind Pig	1974	
The Original Blues Brothers by Buddy Guy & Junior Wells	1982	Intermedia	1964	Re-released in 1999 as The Real Blues.
Last Time Around – Live at Legends by Buddy Guy & Junior Wells	1998	Silvertone	1993	
Every Day I Have the Blues by Buddy Guy & Junior Wells	2000	Purple Pyramid	1964	The album was re-released in 2003 as Live at the Mystery Club and as Chicago Blues Festival 1964 and in 2005 as A Night of the Blues.
Double Dynamite by Buddy Guy & Junior Wells	2001	Aim		
Live in Chicago 88 by Buddy Guy & Otis Rush	2016	Klondike	1988	

=== Concert films ===
Title and artist(s)	Year	Label	Recording year
Messin' With the Blues by Muddy Waters, Buddy Guy, Junior Wells	1991	Rhino	
Carlos Santana Presents Blues at Montreux 2004 by Carlos Santana, Buddy Guy, Clarence Brown & Bobby Parker	2004	Eagle Vision	2004
Live at Nightstage by Junior Wells	2007	Image Entertainment	1986-89

=== Music videos ===
Title and artist(s)	Year
"Mustang Sally" by Buddy Guy with Jeff Beck	1991
"Some Kind of Wonderful" by Buddy Guy feat. Paul Rodgers	1993

== Appearances ==
=== Singles & EPs ===
Title and artist(s)	Year	Label
"Tell Me What I've Done" / "Ooh Baby" by Howlin' Wolf	1965	Chess
"Stop Breakin' Down" / "Mystery Train" by Junior Wells	1968	Vanguard
"I Want An Easy Woman" / "I Am Gonna Unmask the Batman" by Lacy Gibson	1969	Repeto
"Mail Order Mystics" / "I Could Cry" / "Wake Up Call" by John Mayall	1993	Silvertone

=== Albums ===
==== Studio albums ====
Title and artist(s)	Year	Label	Recording year	Notes
Folk Singer by Muddy Waters	1964	Chess		
The Soul of Blues Harmonica by Shakey Horton	1964	Argo		
Five Long Years by Eddie Boyd	1965	Fontana		
The Real Folk Blues by Howlin' Wolf	1965	Chess		
The Real Folk Blues by Sonny Boy Williamson	1966	Chess	1964	
Blues Southside Chicago by Various Artists	1966	Decca	1966	Recorded in Chicago by Willie Dixon.
In Europe by Big Mama Thornton	1966	Arhoolie	1965	
Super Blues by Bo Diddley, Muddy Waters, Little Walter	1967	Checker	1967	
More Real Folk Blues by Sonny Boy Williamson II	1967	Chess		
The Super Super Blues Band by Howlin' Wolf, Muddy Waters, Bo Diddley	1968	Checker	1967	
Koko Taylor by Koko Taylor	1969	Chess		
The New Chicago Blues by Clarence Wheeler	1973	Atlantic	1972	
Freedom by Santana	1987	Columbia		
Coast to Coast by Paul Shaffer	1989	Capitol		
Portrait of the Blues by Lou Rawls	1992	Capitol		
Wake Up Call by John Mayall	1993	Silvertone		
Force of Nature by Koko Taylor	1993	Alligator		
Muddy Water Blues: A Tribute to Muddy Waters by Paul Rodgers	1993	Victory		
Blues Summit by B.B. King	1993	MCA	1993	
I Am the Blues by Big Daddy Kinsey	1993	Verve	1992-93	
Johnnie Be Back by Johnnie Johnson	1995	MusicMasters		
You Gonna Miss Me (When I'm Dead & Gone) by Muddy Waters Tribute Band	1996	Telarc		
Great Guitars by Joe Louis Walker	1997	Polygram		
Dark of the Night by Scott Holt	1999	Lightyear		
The Big $core by Howard & the White Boys	1999	Evidence		
Jim Peterik and World Stage by Jim Peterik and World Stage	2000	World Stage		
Hot Foot Powder by Peter Green	2000	Artisan		
Chapter 1: Love, Pain & Forgiveness by Syleena Johnson	2001	Jive		
Me & the Devil by Peter Green	2001	Artisan		
Jack O The Green: Small World Big Band Friends 3 by Jools Holland & His Rhythm & Blues Orchestra	2003	Rhino		
Les Paul & Friends: American Made World Played by Les Paul & Various Artists	2005	Capitol		
Last Man Standing by Jerry Jee Lewis	2006	Artists First		
Block Music by Shawnna	2006	Disturbing tha Peace/Def Jam		
My Lady Don't Love My Lady by Bryan Lee	2009	Justin Time		
2120 South Michigan Ave. by George Thorogood and the Destroyers	2011	Capitol	2011	
Cyclone by Quinn Sullivan	2011	GBG		
33 1/3 by Shemekia Copeland	2012	Telarc		

==== Live albums ====
Title and artist(s)	Year	Label	Recording year	Notes
Berlin Festival – Guitar Workshop by Various Artists	1968	MPS	1967	
Blues Jam at Chess by Fleetwood Mac & Various Artists	1969	Blue Horizon	1969	Also known as Fleetwood Mac in Chicago or Blues Jam in Chicago.
Doldinger Jubilee '75 by Passport	1975	Atlantic	1975	
24 Nights by Eric Clapton	1991	Reprise	1990-91	
Antone's 20th Anniversary by Various Artists	1996	Discovery	1995	
Rock America: Smash Hits Live by Jim Peterik and World Stage	2003	Frontiers		
Martin Scorsese Presents the Blues - Lightning in a Bottle by Various Artists	2004	Columbia	2003	
Last Man Standing Live by Jerry Jee Lewis and Various Artists	2007	Artists First	2006	
Crossroads Revisited Selections from the Crossroads Guitar Festivals by Eric Clapton & Various Artists	2016	Rhino/Reprise/Duck	2004-13	

==== Compilations ====
Title and artist(s)	Year	Label	Recording year
Atlantic Blues: Chicago by Various Artists	1986	Atlantic	
I Ain't Got No Money - 1950s South Louisiana Blues by Various Artists	1989	Flyright	
Stone Free: A Tribute to Jimi Hendrix by Various Artists	1993	Reprise	
A Tribute to Stevie Ray Vaughan by Various Artists	1996	Epic	
Goin' Home: A Tribute to Fats Domino by Various Artists	2007	Vanguard	2007
Shine a Light by The Rolling Stones	2008	Polydor	2008
Chicago Plays the Stones by Various Artists	2017	Raisin' Music	

==== Soundtracks ====
Title and artist(s)	Year	Label	Recording year
Rush by Eric Clapton	1992	Duck/Reprise	1991
Big Bad Love by Various Artists	2001	Nonesuch	

=== Concert films ===
Title and artist(s)	Year	Label	Recording year
Supershow by Various Artists	1986	Virgin Vision	1969
Crossroads Guitar Festival: 2004 by Eric Clapton and Various Artists	2004	Rhino	2004
Lightning in a Bottle by B.B. King (directed by Antoine Fuqua)	2004	Sony	2003
Crossroads Guitar Festival: 2007 by Eric Clapton and Various Artists	2007	Rhino	2007
Last Man Standing Live by Jerry Jee Lewis and Various Artists	2007	Artists First	2006
Shine a Light by The Rolling Stones (directed by Martin Scorsese)	2008	Paramount	2008
Plays Blues at Montreux 2004 by Carlos Santana	2008	Eagle Vision	2004
In Concert by John Mayer	2009	All Stars	
Crossroads Guitar Festival: 2010 by Eric Clapton and Various Artists	2010	Rhino	2010
Crossroads Guitar Festival: 2013 by Eric Clapton and Various Artists	2013	Rhino	2013

== Tribute albums ==
Title and artist(s)	Year	Label
From Lettsworth to Legend: A Tribute to Buddy Guy by Scott Holt	2007	Audio Fidelity
