= The Very Best of Buddy Guy =

Greatest hits album by Buddy Guy
- Released: May 8, 1992
- Genre: Blues
- Length: 74:27
- Label: Rhino

Buddy Guy chronology
Damn Right, I've Got the Blues (1991)	The Very Best of Buddy Guy (1992)	Feels Like Rain (1993)

Professional ratings
Review scores
Source	Rating
AllMusic	5/5 stars

The Very Best of Buddy Guy is a blues greatest-hits compilation album by Buddy Guy. It was released in 1992. It's the AllMusic "album pick" for compilations of Robbins.

== Track listing ==
1. "First Time I Met the Blues" (Little Brother Montgomery) - 2:09
2. "The Way You Been Treating Me" (Buddy Guy) - 3:14
3. "Sit and Cry (The Blues)" (Willie Dixon) - 3:02
4. "This Is the End" (Ike Turner) - 2:57
5. "Stone Crazy" (Buddy Guy) - 3:00
6. "When My Left Eye Jumps" (Willie Dixon / Albert Lewis Perkins) - 3:54
7. "My Time After Awhile" (Robert Geddins / Ronald Badger / Sheldon Feinberg) - 3:05
8. "Hold That Plane" (Buddy Guy)) - 4:42
9. "Hello San Francisco" (Robert Geddins) - 5:24
10. "Five Long Years" (Eddie Boyd) - 5:52
11. "First Time I Met the Blues (Live)" (Little Brother Montgomery) - 3:45
12. "A Man of Many Words" (Buddy Guy) - 3:59
13. "T-Bone Shuffle" (T-Bone Walker) - 4:16
14. "When You See the Tears From My Eyes" (Buddy Guy / T-Bone Walker) - 5:06
15. "Ten Years Ago" (Buddy Guy) - 3:42
16. "Blues at My Baby's House" (Buddy Guy) - 7:06
17. "She Suits Me to a T" (Buddy Guy) - 4:31
18. "Just Teasin'" (Buddy Guy) - 4:41
