= Live at Legends =

Live album by Buddy Guy
- Released: 2012
- Recorded: Live at Legends
- Genre: blues, Chicago Blues
- Length: 54:38
- Label: RCA
- Producer: Tom Hambridge

Buddy Guy chronology
Living Proof (2010)	Live at Legends (2012)	Rhythm & Blues (2013)

Professional ratings
Review scores
Source	Rating
Allmusic	3/5 stars

Live at Legends is a 2012 album by Buddy Guy. It peaked at #2 on the Billboard Blues chart and #70 on the Billboard Tastemakers chart. The album is a live recording of Buddy Guy at Buddy Guy's Legends, recorded on January 29 & 30, 2010. The album was also nominated for Best New Recording by Living Blues. The album is some of his last recordings at the old Buddy Guy's Legends location and includes three previously unreleased tracks at the end of the album. Guitar World also named it one of the Top 25 Live, Reissued and Archival Albums of 2012.

== Charts ==
Chart (2012)	Peak position
US Blues Albums	2
US Tastemakers	70

== Musicians ==
=== Tracks 1–8 (Recorded Live at Legends) ===
- Buddy Guy - lead guitar, vocals
- Ric 'Jaz' Hall - Guitar
- Marty Sammon - Keyboards, background vocals
- Orlando Wright - Bass
- Tim Austin - Drums
- Tom Hambridge - Background Vocals, Tambourine

=== Bonus studio tracks ===
- Buddy Guy - lead guitar, vocals
- Tom Hambridge - Drums, Percussion
- David Grissom - Guitar
- Reese Wynans - Keyboards, B-3
- Marty Sammon - Piano, Wurlitzer
- Michael Rhodes - Bass
- Tommy Macdonald - Bass
- The Memphis Horns

- Jack Hale - Trombone
- Wayne Jackson - Trumpet
- Tom McGinley - Tenor Saxophone

== Personnel ==
- Tom Hambridge - Producer, Mixing
- Michael Saint-Leon - Mixing
- Michael Maxson - Sound Engineer

== Track listing ==
No.	Title	Writer(s)	Length
1.	"Intro"		0:38
2.	"Best Damn Fool"	Buddy Guy, Tom Hambridge	6:14
3.	"Mannish Boy"	Mel London, Ellas McDaniel. McKinley Morganfield	4:06
4.	"I Just Want to Make Love to You/Chicken Heads"	Calvin Carter, Willie Dixon, Bobby Rush	9:22
5.	"Skin Deep"	Buddy Guy, Tom Hambridge, Gary Nicholson	5:16
6.	"Damn Right I Got the Blues"	Buddy Guy	6:25
7.	"Boom Boom / Strange Brew"	John Lee Hooker, Felix Pappalardi, Eric Clapton, Gail Collins	3:00
8.	"Voodoo Chile / Sunshine of Your Love / Keep on Truckin'"	Pete Brown, Jack Bruce, Eric Clapton; Jimi Hendrix; Leonard Caston Jr., Anita Poree, Frank Wilson	3:35
9.	"Polka Dot Love"	Buddy Guy, Tom Hambridge	5:35
10.	"Coming for You" (featuring The Memphis Horns)	Tom Hambridge, Delbert McClinton, Gary Nicholson	4:23
11.	"Country Boy"	McKinley Morganfield	6:04
