= 25th Anniversary Rock and Roll Hall of Fame Concerts =

Two-day concert in New York, US

- Concert by Rock and Roll Hall of Fame
- Venue: Madison Square Garden, New York City, United States
- Start date: October 29, 2009
- End date: October 30, 2009
- No. of shows: 2
- Attendance: 19,500+
- Website: rockhall.com

The 25th Anniversary Rock and Roll Hall of Fame Concerts were a two-day concert series celebrating the 25th anniversary of the Rock and Roll Hall of Fame. It took place on October 29 and 30, 2009 at Madison Square Garden and the tickets cost between US$75 and US$2,000.

The idea behind the concert was to have Hall of Fame inductees perform in eight segments (Crosby, Stills and Nash, Simon and Garfunkel, Stevie Wonder, Bruce Springsteen, Aretha Franklin, Jeff Beck, Metallica and U2) and to present their own songs or songs originally performed by other Hall of Fame inductees. Eric Clapton was set to perform, but pulled out due to having gallstones removed. Jeff Beck performed as his replacement.

A four-hour compilation of the concert was first broadcast by the US television provider HBO on November 29, 2009. In addition, the concert was released on DVD (HBO compilation on two DVDs plus a bonus DVD), on Blu-ray and on two double CDs or as a 4-CD box (including six bonus pieces).

The appearance of Metallica with Lou Reed eventually led to the recordings of the album Lulu.

== Night 1 ==
Segment	Guest	Song	HBO	DVD	CD	Notes
Jerry Lee Lewis		"Whole Lotta Shakin' Goin' On"				-
Crosby, Stills and Nash	-	"Woodstock"	•	D1,3	•	-
Crosby, Stills and Nash	-	"Marrakesh Express"				-
Crosby, Stills and Nash	-	"Almost Cut My Hair"	•	D1,4	•	-
David Crosby and Graham Nash	Bonnie Raitt	"Love Has No Pride"	•	D1,5	•	Original: Bonnie Raitt
David Crosby and Graham Nash	Bonnie Raitt	"Midnight Rider"				Original: The Allman Brothers Band
David Crosby and Graham Nash	Jackson Browne	"The Pretender"	•	D1,6	•	Original: Jackson Browne
David Crosby and Graham Nash	James Taylor	"Mexico"		D3,1	4	Original: James Taylor
Crosby, Stills and Nash	James Taylor	"Love the One You're With"	•	D1,7	•	Original: Stephen Stills
Crosby, Stills and Nash	-	"Rock & Roll Woman"				Original: Buffalo Springfield
Crosby, Stills and Nash	Bonnie Raitt; Jackson Browne; James Taylor	"Teach Your Children"		D3,2		-
Paul Simon	-	"Diamonds on the Soles of Her Shoes"				-
Paul Simon	-	"Me and Julio Down by the Schoolyard"		D1,14	4	-
Paul Simon	-	"You Can Call Me Al"	•	D1,15	•	-
Paul Simon	Dion DiMucci	"The Wanderer"	•	D1,17	•	Original: Dion DiMucci
Paul Simon	David Crosby and Graham Nash	"Here Comes the Sun"	•	D1,16	•	Original: The Beatles
Paul Simon	-	"Late in the Evening"				-
Little Anthony and the Imperials		"Two People in the World"	•	D1,18	•	-
Simon and Garfunkel	-	"The Sound of Silence"	•	D1,19	•	-
Simon and Garfunkel	-	"Mrs. Robinson" / "Not Fade Away"		D3,7	4	Original ("Not Fade Away"): Buddy Holly
Simon and Garfunkel	-	"The Boxer"	•	D1,20	•	-
Simon and Garfunkel	-	"Bridge over Troubled Water"	•	D1,21	•	-
Simon and Garfunkel	-	"Cecilia"				-
Stevie Wonder	-	"Blowin' in the Wind"				Original: Bob Dylan
Stevie Wonder	-	"Uptight (Everything's Alright)"		D3,3		-
Stevie Wonder	-	"I Was Made to Love You"		D3,4		-
Stevie Wonder	-	"For Once in My Life"	•	D1,8	•	Original: Connie Haines
Stevie Wonder	-	"Signed, Sealed, Delivered I'm Yours"		D3,5	4	-
Stevie Wonder	-	"Boogie on Reggae Woman"				-
Stevie Wonder	Smokey Robinson	"The Tracks of My Tears"	•	D1,9	•	Original: The Miracles
Stevie Wonder	John Legend	"Mercy Mercy Me (The Ecology)"		D3,6	4	Original: Marvin Gaye
Stevie Wonder	John Legend	"The Way You Make Me Feel"	•	D1,10	•	Original: Michael Jackson
Stevie Wonder	B. B. King	"The Thrill is Gone"	•	D1,11	•	Original: B.B. King
Stevie Wonder	-	"Living for the City"				-
Stevie Wonder	Sting	"Higher Ground" / "Roxanne"	•	D1,12	•	Original ("Roxanne"): The Police
Stevie Wonder	Jeff Beck	"Superstition"	•	D1,13	•	-
Bruce Springsteen and the E Street Band	-	"10th Avenue Freeze-Out"				-
Bruce Springsteen and the E Street Band	Sam Moore	"Hold On, I'm Comin'"	•	D2,17		Original: Sam and Dave
Bruce Springsteen and the E Street Band	Sam Moore	"Soul Man"	•	D2,17		Original: Sam and Dave
Bruce Springsteen and the E Street Band	Tom Morello	"The Ghost of Tom Joad"	•	D2,18	•	-
Bruce Springsteen and the E Street Band	John Fogerty	"Fortunate Son"	•	D2,19	•	Original: Creedence Clearwater Revival
Bruce Springsteen and the E Street Band	John Fogerty	"Proud Mary"				Original: Creedence Clearwater Revival
Bruce Springsteen and the E Street Band	John Fogerty	"Oh, Pretty Woman"	•	D2,20	•	Original: Roy Orbison
Bruce Springsteen and the E Street Band	-	"Jungleland"	•	D2,21	•	-
Bruce Springsteen and the E Street Band	Darlene Love	"A Fine, Fine Boy"	•	D2,22	•	Original: Darlene Love
Bruce Springsteen and the E Street Band	Darlene Love	"Da Doo Ron Ron"				Original: The Crystals
Bruce Springsteen and the E Street Band	Tom Morello	"London Calling"		D3,14	4	Original: The Clash
Bruce Springsteen and the E Street Band	Tom Morello	"Badlands"				-
Bruce Springsteen and the E Street Band	Billy Joel	"You May Be Right"				Original: Billy Joel
Bruce Springsteen and the E Street Band	Billy Joel	"Only the Good Die Young"				Original: Billy Joel
Bruce Springsteen and the E Street Band	Billy Joel	"New York State of Mind"	•	D2,23	•	Original: Billy Joel
Bruce Springsteen and the E Street Band	Billy Joel	"Born to Run"	•	D2,24	•	-
Bruce Springsteen and the E Street Band	Darlene Love; John Fogerty; Tom Morello; Billy Joel; Jackson Browne; Sam Moore; Peter Wolf	"(Your Love Keeps Lifting Me) Higher and Higher"	E	D2,25; D3,15	E	Original: Jackie Wilson

== Night 2 ==
Segment	Guest	Song	HBO	DVD	CD	Notes
Jerry Lee Lewis		"Great Balls of Fire"	•	D1,2	•	-
Aretha Franklin	-	"Baby I Love You"	•	D1,22		-
Aretha Franklin	-	"Don't Play That Song (You Lied)"	•	D1,23		Original: Ben E. King
Aretha Franklin	-	"Make Them Hear You"				Original: Ragtime (musical)
Aretha Franklin	Annie Lennox	"Chain of Fools"	•	D1,24		-
Aretha Franklin	-	"New York, New York"				Original: Liza Minnelli
Aretha Franklin	Lenny Kravitz	"Think"				-
Aretha Franklin	-	"Respect"				Original: Otis Redding
Jeff Beck	-	"Drown in My Own Tears"				Original: Ray Charles
Jeff Beck	Sting	"People Get Ready"	•	D2,13	•	Original: The Impressions
Jeff Beck	-	"Freeway Jam"		D3,12		-
Jeff Beck	-	"Cause We've Ended as Lovers"				Original: Syreeta Wright
Jeff Beck	Buddy Guy	"Let Me Love You Baby"	•	D2,14	•	Original: Willie Dixon
Jeff Beck	-	"Big Block"		D3,13		-
Jeff Beck	-	"Rice Pudding"	•	•	•	-
Jeff Beck	Billy Gibbons	"Foxy Lady"	•	D2,15	•	Original: Jimi Hendrix
Jeff Beck	Billy Gibbons	"Rough Boy"				Original: ZZ Top
Jeff Beck	-	"A Day in the Life"	•	D2,16	•	Original: The Beatles
Metallica	-	"For Whom the Bell Tolls"	•	D2,1	•	-
Metallica	-	"One"				-
Metallica	-	"Turn the Page"		D3,8	•	Original: Bob Seger
Metallica	Lou Reed	"Sweet Jane"	•	D2,2	•	Original: The Velvet Underground
Metallica	Lou Reed	"White Light/White Heat"				Original: The Velvet Underground
Metallica	Ozzy Osbourne	"Iron Man"	E	D2,3; D3,9	•	Original: Black Sabbath
Metallica	Ozzy Osbourne	"Paranoid"	E	D2,3; D3,9	•	Original: Black Sabbath
Metallica	Ray Davies	"You Really Got Me"				Original: The Kinks
Metallica	Ray Davies	"All Day and All of the Night"	•	D2,4	•	Original: The Kinks
Metallica	-	"Stone Cold Crazy"				Original: Queen
Metallica	-	"Enter Sandman"	•	D2,5	•	-
U2	-	"Vertigo"	•	D2,6	•	-
U2	-	"Magnificent"	•	D2,7	•	-
U2	Bruce Springsteen; Patti Smith; Roy Bittan	"Because the Night"	•	D2,8	•	Original: Patti Smith
U2	Bruce Springsteen; Roy Bittan	"I Still Haven't Found What I'm Looking For"	•	D2,9	•	-
U2	-	"Mysterious Ways"		D3,10	•	-
U2	Black Eyed Peas	"Where is the Love?" / "One"		D3,11	•	-
U2	Mick Jagger; Fergie; Will.i.am	"Gimme Shelter"	•	D2,10	•	Original: The Rolling Stones
U2	Mick Jagger	"Stuck in a Moment You Can't Get Out Of"	•	D2,11	•	-
U2	-	"Beautiful Day"	•	D2,12	•	-

== HBO 3-disc DVD Set ==
This is the order of performances on the DVD discs. For concert order, see preceding sections "Night 1" and "Night 2".

=== DVD disc 1 ===
- Tom Hanks
  - Introduction
- Jerry Lee Lewis
  - Great Balls Of Fire
- Crosby, Stills & Nash
  - Woodstock
  - Almost Cut My Hair
  - Love Has No Pride (with Bonnie Raitt)
  - The Pretender (with Jackson Browne)
  - Love The One You're With (with James Taylor)
- Stevie Wonder
  - For Once In My Life
  - The Tracks Of My Tears (with Smokey Robinson)
  - The Way You Make Me Feel (with John Legend)
  - The Thrill Is Gone (with B.B. King)
  - Higher Ground/Roxanne (with Sting)
  - Superstition (with Jeff Beck)
- Paul Simon
  - Me And Julio Down By The Schoolyard
  - You Can Call Me Al
  - Here Comes The Sun (with David Crosby and Graham Nash)
  - The Wanderer (with Dion Dimucci)
- Little Anthony & The Imperials
  - Two People In The World
- Simon & Garfunkel
  - The Sounds Of Silence
  - The Boxer
  - Bridge Over Troubled Water
- Aretha Franklin
  - Baby I Love You
  - Don't Play That Song
  - Chain Of Fools (with Annie Lennox)

=== DVD disc 2 ===
- Metallica
  - For Whom The Bell Tolls
  - Sweet Jane (with Lou Reed)
  - Iron Man/Paranoid (with Ozzy Osbourne) (duplicated on bonus disc 3)
  - All Day And All Of The Night (with Ray Davies)
  - Enter Sandman
- U2
  - Vertigo
  - Magnificent
  - Because The Night (with Bruce Springsteen, Patti Smith, and Roy Bittan)
  - I Still Haven't Found What I'm Looking For (with Bruce Springsteen)
  - Gimme Shelter (with Mick Jagger, Fergie and Will.I.Am)
  - Stuck In A Moment You Can't Get Out Of (with Mick Jagger)
  - Beautiful Day
- Jeff Beck
  - People Get Ready (with Sting)
  - Let Me Love You Baby (with Buddy Guy)
  - Foxey Lady (with Billy Gibbons)
  - A Day In The Life
- Bruce Springsteen & The E Street Band
  - Hold On, I'm Comin'/Soul Man (with Sam Moore)
  - The Ghost Of Tom Joad (with Tom Morello)
  - Fortunate Son (with John Fogerty)
  - Oh, Pretty Woman (with John Fogerty)
  - Jungleland
  - A Fine Fine Boy (with Darlene Love)
  - New York State Of Mind (with Billy Joel)
  - Born To Run (with Billy Joel)
  - (Your Love Keeps Lifting Me) Higher And Higher (with Darlene Love, John Fogerty, Sam Moore, Billy Joel, and Tom Morello) (duplicated on bonus disc 3)
  - credits

=== DVD disc 3 (bonus) ===
- Crosby, Stills & Nash
  - Mexico (with James Taylor)
  - Teach Your Children (with Bonnie Raitt, Jackson Browne, and James Taylor)
- Stevie Wonder
  - Uptight (Everything's Alright)
  - I Was Made To Love Her
  - Signed, Sealed, Delivered I'm Yours
  - Mercy Mercy Me (The Ecology) (with John Legend)
- Simon & Garfunkel
  - Mrs. Robinson/Not Fade Away
- Metallica
  - Turn The Page
  - Iron Man/Paranoid (with Ozzy Osbourne) (duplicate of performance on disc 2)
- U2
  - Mysterious Ways
  - Where Is The Love/One (with The Black Eyed Peas)
- Jeff Beck
  - Freeway Jam
  - Big Block
- Bruce Springsteen & The E Street Band
  - London Calling (with Tom Morello)
  - (Your Love Keeps Lifting Me) Higher And Higher (with Darlene Love, John Fogerty, Sam Moore, Billy Joel, and Tom Morello) (duplicate of performance on disc 2)
  - credits
