= Live: The Real Deal =

Live album by Buddy Guy
- Released: 1996
- Venues: Buddy Guy's Legends, Irving Plaza
- Genre: Blues
- Label: Silvertone
- Producers: Buddy Guy, Eddie Kramer

Buddy Guy chronology
Slippin' In (1994)	Live: The Real Deal (1996)	Buddy's Blues (1997)

Live: The Real Deal is a live album by the American musician Buddy Guy, released in 1996. It peaked at No. 4 on the UK's Jazz & Blues Albums Chart. The album was nominated for a Grammy Award for "Best Contemporary Blues Album".

== Production ==
The album was produced by Guy and Eddie Kramer. It was recorded over four shows at Buddy Guy's Legends and Irving Plaza. Guy was backed by G. E. Smith and the Saturday Night Live Band, including the horn section. Johnnie Johnson played piano on the album. Guy regretted that the band had not rehearsed more.

== Critical reception ==
Professional ratings
Review scores
Source	Rating
AllMusic	4/5 stars
Edmonton Journal	4/5 stars
The Encyclopedia of Popular Music	4/5 stars
MusicHound Folk: The Essential Album Guide	2.5/5 stars
The Penguin Guide to Blues Recordings	3.5/4 stars
Pittsburgh Post-Gazette	3/4 stars
(The New) Rolling Stone Album Guide	3/5 stars

The San Diego Union-Tribune wrote that "Guy's guitar and vocals pierce and scintillate, and no one better understands the tension between supercharged guitar runs and a primal blues beat." The Pittsburgh Post-Gazette noted that "there's a run about halfway through his classic 13-minute version of 'I've Got News for You' where his guitar approaches the point of spontaneous combustion." The Wall Street Journal determined that "the backing group ... is a more than competent unit, but, as cues are missed and cliches abound, it's clear they hadn't had much opportunity to rehearse with Guy." The Edmonton Journal stated that "this take of 'Sweet Black Angel' has some genuine tenderness." The Independent opined that, "unlike some bluesmen, he never forgets that he is playing for an audience, not just for himself."

AllMusic wrote: "No outrageous rock-based solos or Cream/Hendrix/Stevie Ray homages; this is the Buddy Guy album that purists have salivated for the last quarter century or so." MusicHound Folk: The Essential Album Guide panned the "pompous" G. E. Smith.

== Track listing ==
No.	Title	Writer(s)	Length
1.	"I've Got My Eyes on You"	Willie Dixon	4:11
2.	"Sweet Black Angel (Black Angel Blues)"	Lucille Bogan	7:49
3.	"Talk to Me Baby"	Willie Dixon	3:57
4.	"My Time After Awhile"	Ron Badger; Robert L. Geddins; Sheldon Feinberg	7:40
5.	"I've Got News for You"	Roy Alfred	13:02
6.	"Damn Right I've Got the Blues"	Buddy Guy	7:41
7.	"First Time I Met the Blues"	Eurreal Wilford "Little Brother" Montgomery	6:58
8.	"Ain't That Lovin' You"	Don Robey	2:36
9.	"Let Me Love You Baby"	Dixon	5:48
Total length:			59:42
