= Monticello Railway Museum =

Railway museum in Monticello, Illinois, United States

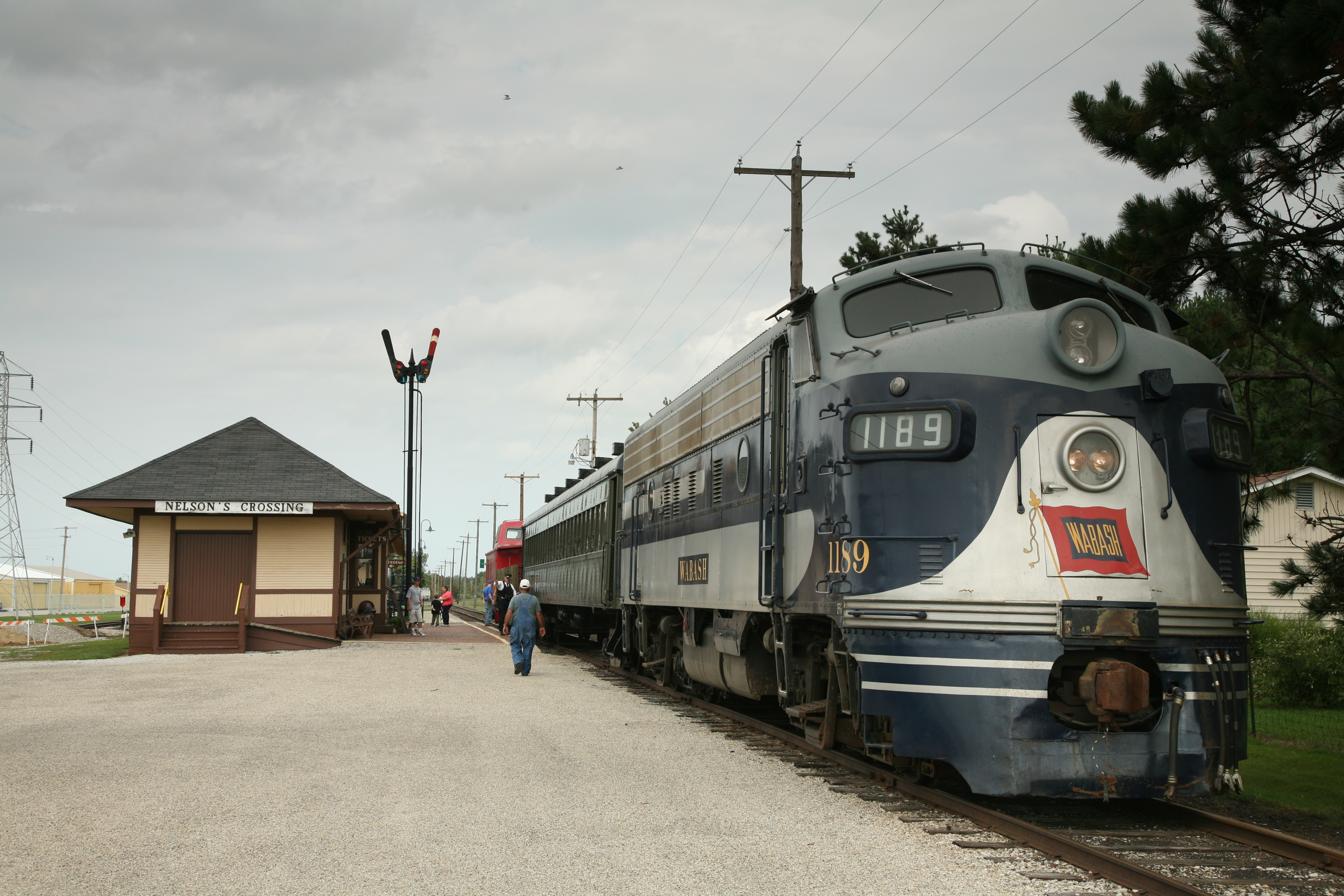
- Wabash Railroad F7A #1189, rests in front of the Nelson's Crossing depot
- Locale: Monticello, Piatt County, Central Illinois

Preserved operations
- Reporting mark: MRMZ (Note: Direct sources from the AAR/NMFTA cannot be publicly accessed/located, although such markings have been second-handedly verified via the FRA, ILDOT, and visual wise; however, these marks may be considered expired, reassigned, or unofficial as of 2009.) (Temporary equipment transfers/loans)
- Stations: 2
- Length: 15 mi (24 km)
- Preserved gauge: 4 ft 8 1/2 in (1,435 mm) standard gauge

Commercial history
- Opened: 1966

Preservation history
- Headquarters: Monticello, Illinois

Website
- www.mrym.org

The Monticello Railway Museum (initialized MRYM, reporting mark MRMZ) is a non-profit heritage railroad museum located in Monticello, Illinois, about 18 miles west of Champaign, Illinois. It is home to over 100 pieces of railroad equipment, including several restored diesel locomotives and cars.

== Overview ==
The museum offers a tourist railroad which operates excursion trains over a former railroad line that was owned by Illinois Terminal and Illinois Central Gulf. For a donation, guests can operate one of the locomotives during the "Throttle Time" program. Trains run from May through October and on holidays.

The Camp Creek yard was originally built by the museum's volunteers. The Terminal Division is a rebuilt Illinois Terminal right-of-way running from Camp Creek up to Blacker's towards White Heath. The Central Division was purchased by the museum from the Illinois Central. The Central Division purchase allowed the museum to enter downtown Monticello to the historic Wabash Railroad depot, which is the mainline of the museum's heritage railroad. The Central Division is currently being restored up to White Heath to allow occasional operation into that town. Only a short section of the Terminal Division is currently in use from the central switch down past Nelson's Crossing depot into Camp Creek Yard but has been restored to within a few miles of White Heath.

=== Location ===
The Monticello Railway Museum is located off Interstate 72 at Market St. Exit 166. Turn at the stoplight onto Iron Horse Place at the Best Western Gateway Inn, and follow the frontage road to the end. Driving time is about 25 minutes from Champaign and Decatur; 50 minutes from Bloomington.

=== History ===
The Monticello Railway Museum, a not-for-profit educational organization, was founded in 1966 as "SPUR, Inc" (Society for the Perpetuation of Unretired Railfans, Inc). Its original goal was to encourage the Chicago, Burlington & Quincy Railroad to continue operating its steam-powered railfan excursions. When that effort failed, the organization decided to operate its own steam-powered excursions and began a search for equipment and a suitable location. SPUR contacted the Illinois Central Railroad about operating on the West end of ICRR's lightly used Rantoul District between LeRoy and Sabina, Illinois. For such an operation, ICRR would require SPUR's equipment to be in "ICC condition" and use the railroad's union train crews. SPUR concluded this would be prohibitively expensive for the organization and continued its search. In 1966, SPUR was invited to Monticello, Illinois by a member of the Illinois Pioneer Heritage Center and moved its first piece of equipment, locomotive #1, a 1925 Alco 0-4-0T, to a vacant lot near the Heritage Center in Monticello. The organization's name was changed in 1970 to the Monticello & Sangamon Valley Railway Historical Society, Inc., and then shortened in 1982 to the present day Monticello Railway Museum.

The first land purchased was about five miles (8 km) of former Illinois Terminal interurban right of way between Monticello and White Heath. This right of way had been abandoned a few years before and the grade had only ballast in place. A former popcorn field was purchased for a railroad yard and maintenance area. The volunteers prepared the yard area for the arrival of locomotive #1 and moved it from the Heritage Center's lot in Monticello. Through the years track was laid on the former Illinois Terminal interurban grade toward White Heath until approximately 2 1/2 miles was completed. A run-around was constructed at (Blacker's), about 2 miles from White Heath. No further construction took place on the former interurban grade and Blacker's became the North end of the line. In 1988, after the purchase of some of the adjacent Illinois Central Gulf's Decatur District, the portion of the museum's trackage built on the former Illinois Terminal interurban grade was designated the "Terminal Division."

In 1975, an old-time piano contest by the name of the World Championship Old-Time Piano Playing Contest and Festival was started on the land of the new railway museum as a fundraiser. The contest remained at the museum using a piano on the back of a caboose and the audience in lawn chairs around it for about ten years, until it was moved to the football field of Monticello High School.

In 1987, the museum purchased 7 1/2 miles of Illinois Central Gulf Decatur District trackage between Monticello and White Heath which parallels the Illinois Terminal right-of-way. The Nelson Crossing display track lead was extended to a new connecting turnout in the former ICG trackage, joining the museum's track with the newly purchased line. The connection was built by Museum volunteers in just two weekends. After a short "Golden Spike" ceremony, the museum's first run into Monticello was made. The former Illinois Central Gulf trackage to Monticello and White Heath was designated the museum's "Central Division."

Today the train ride primarily traverses the Central Division, using the Terminal Division only when pulling into the depot at Nelson's Crossing. The station names used on both the Central and Terminal Divisions were used by the original railroads.

== Special events ==
=== Railroad Days ===
Among the special events at the museum, Railroad Days are held each year on the third weekend of September. One daily ticket allows riders to experience the ultimate railroad experience in the Midwest. A regular passenger train using former Illinois Central coaches and office car #7 and a mixed-freight train, run into White Heath. Other rail equipment operates throughout the event, including a caboose hop to the main shop facilities, where guests can tour.

=== Fireworks Special ===
A fireworks special train, pulled by two locomotives, leaves at 8:00 pm and travels north to the museum grounds to view fireworks. Air-conditioned coaches, an open-air car, and open-window coaches are used.

=== The Polar Express ===
The Polar Express is a train ride experience themed after the 2004 film. Like the film's setting, it features hot chocolate and characters like the dancers and Santa Claus. It runs on four weekends between November and December with a total of 32 runs per year. Guests can book for a standard coach seat, special coach seat, private table on a restored dining car, Private Presidential Room, or the private observation car.

== Structures ==
Nelson's Crossing Depot was donated in 1977. This Illinois Central Railroad depot was formerly located in Deland, Illinois. The depot was built in 1919 and rebuilt in 1942. The depot was moved to the museum in 1980 and is the ticket office and gift shop of the museum.

The Wabash Depot was built in 1899 to replace a smaller depot that had burned earlier that year. At the time the Wabash mainline went through Monticello between what is now the grain elevator and McDonald's. The line was moved west onto a fill, straightened, and a new steel bridge was built over what was the Illinois Central Railroad (now Monticello Railway Museum trackage). On April 20, 1904, the depot was moved to higher ground beside the new mainline. The depot was moved to its present location on May 29, 1987, and was restored by the Monticello Depot Association. January 1. 1993, that organization, its members and its assets were absorbed into the Monticello Railway Museum.

== Equipment ==
=== Locomotives ===
Locomotive details
Number	Images	Type	Model	Built	Builder	Status
1		Steam	0-4-0	1929	American Locomotive Company	Display
31		Diesel	RS1325	1960	Electro-Motive Diesel	Operational
44		Diesel	44-ton switcher	1940	Davenport Locomotive Works	Display
191		Steam	0-6-0	1916	American Locomotive Company	Display
303		Steam	4-6-0	1916	Baldwin Locomotive Works	Stored, awaiting restoration
401		Steam	2-8-0	1907	Baldwin Locomotive Works	Operational
784		Diesel	SW1200	1955	Electro-Motive Diesel	Stored, awaiting restoration
1189		Diesel	F7A	1953	General Motors Diesel Division	Operational
1407		Diesel	SW14	1950	Electro-Motive Diesel	Stored, awaiting restoration
1559		Diesel	RS-3	1955	American Locomotive Company	Stored, awaiting repairs
1649		Diesel	NW2	1947	Electro-Motive Diesel	Display
5764		Diesel	E8A	1952	Electro-Motive Diesel	Undergoing restoration
6071		Diesel	SD40	1964	Electro-Motive Diesel	Display
6789		Diesel	FPA4	1959	Montreal Locomotive Works	Operational
6862		Diesel	FPB4	1958	Montreal Locomotive Works	Operational
8733		Diesel	GP11	1958	Electro-Motive Diesel	Operational
9940		Diesel	E9A	1950	Electro-Motive Diesel	Display

=== Rolling stock ===
Rolling stock details
Number / Name	Images	Type	Built	Builder	Status
6		Office car	1911	American Car and Foundry	Display
7		Observation car	1917	Pullman Company	Operational
105		Tank car	1928	General American Transportation Corp.	Operational
127		Boxcar	1964	Unknown	Stored
405		Baggage car	1957	American Car and Foundry	Display
509		Tank car	1965	General American Transportation Corp.	Operational
758		Railway Post Office	1882	Chicago and Alton Railroad	Stored, awaiting restoration
806		Caboose	1924	Illinois Terminal Railroad	operational
827		Baggage car	1892	Pullman Company	Stored, awaiting restoration
892		Combine	1918	Pullman Company	Operational
903		Railway Post Office	1903	American Car and Foundry	Stored, awaiting restoration
1145		Tank car	1972	Union Tank Car Company	Stored
1238		Coach	1927	American Car and Foundry	Undergoing restoration
C1735		Caboose	1910	Baltimore and Ohio Railroad	Display
1827		coach	1947	Pullman Company	Operational
1879		Caboose	1909	unknown	operational
1907		Flatcar	1929	Nickel Plate Road	Operational
C2210		Caboose	1929	Baltimore and Ohio Railroad	Stored
2541		Coach	1925	Pullman Company	Operational
2612		Coach	1947	Pullman Company	Operational
2824		Caboose	1949	Wabash Railroad	Display
2834		Caboose	1949	Wabash Railroad	Out of service
2834		Caboose	1949	Wabash Railroad	Stored
2855		Coach	1918	Pullman Company	Stored, awaiting restoration
2920		Coach	1925	Pullman Company	Operational
2954		Caboose	1968	International Car Company	Display
3161		Tank car	Unknown	Unknown	Stored, awaiting restoration
3312		Sleeping car	1942	Unknown	Operational
3516		Boxcar	1906	Chicago and Alton Railroad	Stored, awaiting restoration
3531		Coach	1950	Pullman Company	Display
4110		Dining car	1946	Pullman Company	Operational
4112		Dining car	1946	Pullman Company	Operational
5571		Boxcar	1966	Chicago Freight Car Company	Stored
7297		Tank car	1925	General American Transportation Corp.	Operational
7990		Hopper car	1961	Magor Car Company	Operational
9012		Sleeping car	1950	American Car and Foundry	Stored
9365		Caboose	1972	Illinois Central Railroad	Display
9570		Caboose	1969	Illinois Central Railroad	Display
9831		Caboose	1941	Illinois Central Railroad	Operational
9926		Caboose	1950	Illinois Central Railroad	Operational
14042		Caboose	1891	Chicago, Burlington & Quincy RR	Undergoing restoration
26012		Boxcar	1950s	General American Transportation Corp.	Undergoing restoration
41390		Boxcar	1937	General American Transportation Corp.	Operational
47947		Boxcar	1927	unknown	Undergoing restoration
65018		Hopper car	1955	Illinois Central Railroad	Operational
70528		Flatcar	1951	General American Transportation Corp.	Operational
70557		Flatcar	1951	General American Transportation Corp.	Operational
80129		Hopper car	1953	American Car and Foundry	Operational
82697		Boxcar	1941	Wabash Railroad	Out of service, awaiting repairs
99100		Caboose	1910	American Car and Foundry	Stored
477692		Caboose	1909	unknown	Stored
500836		Caboose	1943	Pittsburgh & West Virginia Ry	Display
555047		Caboose	1976	International Car Company	Operational
557530		Caboose	1960	Nickel Plate Road	Stored
567595		Boxcar	unknown	unknown	Display
City of Decatur		Parlor car	1927	Pullman Company	Stored, awaiting restoration
Gulfport		Observation car	1942	Pullman Company	Stored, awaiting restoration
Nautilus		Aquarium car	1949	Pullman Company	Display
Pleasant Valley		Sleeping car	1942	Pullman Company	Display
Timothy B. Blackstone		Sleeping car	1950	American Car and Foundry	Stored, awaiting restoration

== See also ==
- List of United States railroads
  - List of Illinois railroads
- List of heritage railroads in the United States
- List of railway museums
- This 1980 documentary film of Engine #1 was shot at this location. It provides an excellent overview of steam engine physics and nomenclature, and how to operate one.
