= World Championship Old-Time Piano Playing Contest and Festival =

- 1975–present
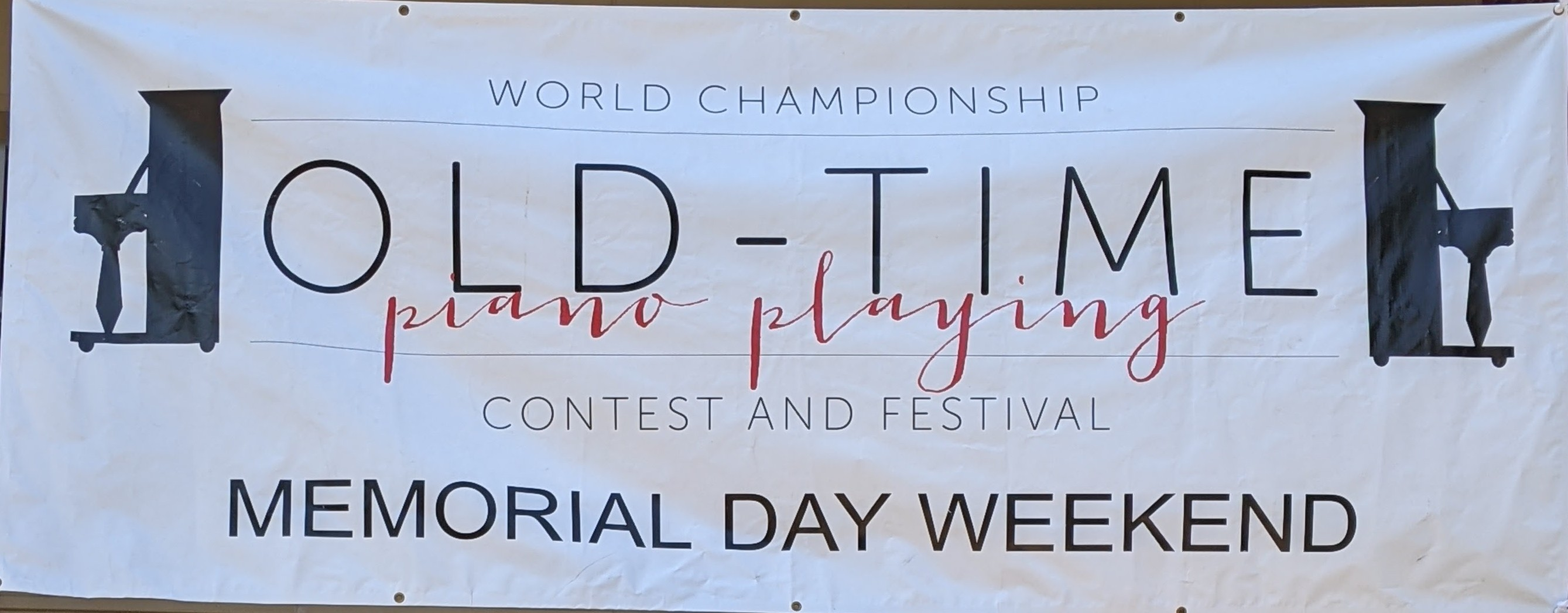
- The contest banner outside the University of Mississippi's David H. Nutt Auditorium on May 25, 2024

Tournament information
- Sport: Old-Time Piano Playing
- Location: Oxford, MS
- Dates: 1975–Current
- Established: 1975
- Host(s): Adam Swanson, Ted Lemen
- Venue(s): University of Mississippi, The Old Henry on Oxford Square

Tournament statistics
- Attendance: Visitors from around the world
- Top scorer: Adam Swanson (4 wins)-USA

The World Championship Old-Time Piano Playing Contest and Festival is an annual event that takes place over Memorial Day Weekend in Oxford, MS every year.

The name "Old-Time Piano Playing" refers to the genre of Ragtime, Traditional Jazz, Novelty, Stride Piano, and Boogie-woogie.

== History ==
The contest started in 1975 as a fundraiser for the Monticello Railway Museum, and remained in Monticello, IL for the first twelve competitions. The first eleven contests brought in many viewers after the first champion, Joybelle Squibb, appeared on the Mike Douglas Show, and audiences to the contest brought lawn chairs to the event, and arranged them around the location of the contest. The first eleven contests took place at the Monticello Railway Museum using a piano on the back of a caboose, and the twelfth contest took place on the football field of the Monticello High School. This particular contest happened to take place on the same day as the 1986 Hands Across America event. The threat of traffic from this particular reason as well as the threat of rains the day of the contest deterred almost all possible contest goers from the event. In 1987, due to the drop in interest because of the varying weather conditions, the contest was moved to the Holiday Inn in Decatur, IL. The contest remained in Decatur until in mid 1990s, when it was moved to Peoria, IL. In Peoria, the contest took place at the Four Points by Sheraton, Hotel Pere Marquette, and Embassy Suites throughout the contest's history in the town, and after hours parties were hosted at Shakey's Pizza Parlor in Champaign, IL. In 2016, the contest was moved to University of Mississippi in Oxford, MS, the current residence of the contest. As of 2025, the main contests and presentations take place at the David H. Nutt Auditorium of the University of Mississippi, and the after hours concerts and parties take place at the Old Henry in downtown Oxford.

== Rules ==
There are several divisions of the contest. The junior and senior divisions have similar rules to the regular division, which requires that pianists play selections written no later than 1939 and adhering to the following definition of "old time music":

"The style of piano playing found primarily in public venues of performance between 1890 and 1939, particularly in bars and piano competitions, consisting of popular songs and instrumentals of that era, including ragtime, traditional jazz, novelty, stride, and boogie, but excluding advanced chord progressions more commonly found by 1940 or later in symphonic, modern jazz and bebop music forms. Selections may also include music idiomatic to solo piano performance and popular dance styles."-Official World Championship Old-Time Piano Playing Contest and Festival Rules.

Contestants are also judged on their costumes.

There is also a "New Rag Contest", which requires that pianist play their own original compositions.

== Winners ==
The contest is split into three different Divisions and one individual contest. These are:

- Regular Division
- Junior Division
- Senior Division
- New Rag Contest

=== Regular Division ===
The Regular Division is open to old-time piano players aged from 18 years old to 65 years old.

Note: On the tables below, an asterisk next to a name denotes a three-time (thus retired) contestant.

Past Regular Division Winners
Year	Name	Country	Notes
1975	Joybelle Squibb	USA	Mother of actress June Squibb, appeared on the Mike Douglas Show
1976	Joybelle Squibb	USA	
1977	Dorothy M. Herrold*	USA	
1978	Dorothy M. Herrold*	USA	
1979	Dorothy M. Herrold*	USA	
1980	Bruce Petsche	USA	
1981	Mark Haldorson*	USA	
1982	Mark Haldorson*	USA	
1983	Mark Haldorson*	USA	
1984	Janet Kaizer	USA	
1985	Janet Kaizer	USA	
1986	Ron Trotta*	USA	Went on to become New York's "Musical TV Weatherman"
1987	Ron Trotta*	USA	
1988	Ron Trotta*	USA	
1989	Julie McClarey*	USA	
1990	Marty Mincer	USA	
1991	"Professor" Bill Edwards	USA	
1992	Paul Gronemeier	USA	
1993	Marty Mincer	USA	
1994	Mimi Blais	USA	
1995	Julie McClarey*	USA	
1996	Julie McClarey*	USA	
1997	Brian Holland*	USA	
1998	Brian Holland*	USA	
1999	Brian Holland*	USA	
2000	Mimi Blais	USA	
2001	Dan Mouyard	USA	
2002	Adam Downey	USA	
2003	Dan Mouyard	USA	
2004	Adam Yarian*	USA	
2005	Adam Yarian*	USA	
2006	Adam Yarian*	USA	
2007	Ethan Uslan*	USA	
2008	Adam Swanson*	USA	Only Four-Time Winner of the Contest
2009	Adam Swanson*	USA	
2010	Adam Swanson*	USA	
2011	Martin Spitznagel	USA	
2012	Ethan Uslan*	USA	
2013	Russell Wilson	USA	Pianist for the "Presidents Own" US Marine Band
2014	Ethan Uslan*	USA	
2015	Adam Swanson*	USA	
2016	William McNally	USA	
2017	William McNally	USA	
2018	Jean Baptiste-Franc	FRA	First international winner of the contest (from France)
2019	Paul Orsi*	USA	Worked as a ragtime pianist at Disneyland's "Coke Corner"
2020	-No Contest-	N/A	An online virtual showcase occurred this year
2021	-No Contest-	N/A	An online virtual showcase occurred this year
2022	Eve Elliot	USA	First female winner in more than 20 years
2023	Paul Orsi*	USA	
2024	Paul Orsi*	USA	
2025	Russell Wilson	USA	Pianist for the "Presidents Own" US Marine Band

=== Junior Division ===
The Junior Division is open to all old-time pianist ages 0 to 18. The table below shows all of the past winners of the Junior Division from 1985 to 2024, because from when the contest started (1975) to 1984 Junior contestants were mixed into the Regular Division. In 1985, it was deemed that it was too difficult for Junior contestants to be successful in that setting, and the Junior Division was formed.

Note: The "Theme Piece" rule from the Regular Division does not apply to the Junior Division.

Past Junior Division Winners
Year	Name	County	Notes
1985	Neil Moe*	USA	
1986	Neil Moe*	USA	
1987	Neil Moe*	USA	
1988	Dax Baumgartner*	USA	Went on to become the Keyboardist for NSYNC
1989	Dax Baumgartner*	USA	
1990	Dax Baumgartner*	USA	
1991	Adam Downey*	USA	
1992	Adam Downey*	USA	
1993	Adam Downey*	USA	
1994	Marty Sammon	USA	Went on to become Buddy Guy's Pianist/Keyboardist
1995	Marty Sammon	USA	
1996	Dan Mouyard	USA	
1997	Noah Harmon	USA	
1998	Adam Yarian*	USA	
1999	Adam Yarian*	USA	
2000	Adam Yarian*	USA	
2001	Harrison Wade	USA	
2002	Will Best	USA	
2003	Adam Swanson*	USA	
2004	Adam Swanson*	USA	
2005	Harrison Wade	USA	
2006	Adam Swanson*	USA	
2007	Wesley Reznicek	USA	
2008	Cassidy Gephart	USA	
2009	Wesley Reznicek	USA	
2010	Morgan Siever	USA	
2011	Morgan Siever	USA	
2012	Daniel Souvigny*	USA	Went on to become Buddy Guy's Pianist/Keyboardist (immediately after Marty Sammon)
2013	Isaac Smith	USA	
2014	Daniel Souvigny*	USA	
2015	Daniel Souvigny*	USA	
2016	Nina Freeman	USA	
2017	Nathan Beasley	USA	
2018	Kelton Boblits	USA	
2019	Kelton Boblits	USA	
2020	-No Contest-	N/A	An online virtual showcase occurred this year
2021	-No Contest-	N/A	An online virtual showcase occurred this year
2022	John Beggs	USA	
2023	John Patrick Hutchinson	USA	
2024	John Beggs	USA	
2025	John Patrick Hutchinson	USA	

=== Senior Division ===
The Senior Division is open to all pianists aged 60 years old or older. The table below shows all of the winners of the World Championship Old-Time Piano Playing Contest from 2018, when it was deemed more suitable for senior to have their own division, to 2024.

Year	Name	Country	Notes
2018	John Remmers	USA	
2019	Bobby van Deusen*	USA	
2020	-No Contest-	N/A	An online virtual showcase occurred this year
2021	-No Contest-	N/A	An online virtual showcase occurred this year
2022	Bobby van Deusen*	USA	
2023	Bobby van Deusen*	USA	
2024	Faye Ballard	USA	
2025	Tim Barton	USA	

=== New Rag Contest ===
The New Rag Contest is open to all pianists of any ages. Below is a table of all of the winners of the New Rag Contest from 1997 to 2024.

Year	Name	New Rag	Country	Notes
1997	Gale Foehner	"Crondolette Rag"	USA	This composition is often misspelled as "Carondelet"
1998	Mimi Blais	"The Turkey"	USA	
1999	Michael Stalcup	"Short Mountain Falldown"	USA	
2000	Dan Mouyard	"Mojo's Marbles"	USA	
2001	Bill Edwards*	"The Necromancer"	USA	
2002	Bill Edwards*	"The Wiener Schnitzel"	USA	
2003	David Feurzeig	"Stride-Rite Rag"	USA	
2004	Ted Lemen	"The Last Rag Standing"	USA	Founder of the contest
2005	Ted Lemen	"The Number 2 Rag"	USA	
2006	John Harmon	"The Raspberry Rag"	USA	
2007	Martin Spitznagel*	"Red Elephant Rag"	USA	
2008	Bill McNally*	"Blue Donkey Rag"	USA	
2009	Bill McNally*	"Mocha Monkey Rag"	USA	
2010	Jacob Adams*	"Procrastinaporag"	USA	
2011	Martin Spitznagel*	"The Smoky Rose"	USA	
2012	Bill McNally*	"Fancy Flight"	USA	
2013	Adam Swanson	"Strater Shuffle"	USA	Composition named for the Strater Hotel in Durango, CO
2014	Vincent Matthew Johnson	"...And So Forth"	USA	
2015	David Cavalari	"That 45 RPM Rag"	USA	
2016	Bill Edwards*	"Le Syncope du Papillon"	USA	
2017	Martin Spitznagel*	"Dreams of Irene"	USA	Tie between Martin Spitznagel and Jacob Adams
2017	Jacob Adams*	"Quintessential Rag"	USA	Tie between Martin Spitznagel and Jacob Adams
2018	Jacob Adams*	"Split Personality Rag"	USA	
2019	David Cavalari	"The Nickelodeon Rag"	USA	
2020	-No Contest-	N/A	N/A	An online virtual showcase occurred this year
2021	Sam Post	"Lighthouse Rag"	USA	An online virtual New Rag Contest occurred this year
2022	Warren Ertle	"Yellow Hammer Rag"	USA	Tie between Warren Ertle and Sam Post
2022	Sam Post	"Angels' Watch Rag"	USA	Tie between Warren Ertle and Sam Post
2023	Adam Swanson, Paul Orsi, Tom Lakeland	"Transatlantic Rag"	USA, USA, GBR	Named for the "transatlantic" relationship between the composers
2024	Tom Lakeland	"Woodpecker Rag"	GBR	
2025	Jared Szabo	"Gateway Rag"	USA	First winner under the age of 18

=== Duet Contest ===
The Duet Contest was open to all pianists, as long as they entered with a partner. Below is a table of all of the winners of the Duet Contest from when it was formed in 2016, to when it was dropped in 2019 to make way for the new Senior Division.

Year	Names	Country	Notes
2016	Adam Swanson & Four Arrows	USA & USA	
2017	Daniel Souvigny & Nathan Beasley	USA & USA	
2018	Adam Swanson & Daniel Souvigny	USA & USA	
2019	Don Jacobs (Four Arrows) & Richard Jacobs	USA & USA	
