= Marty Sammon =

American blues keyboardist (1977–2022)

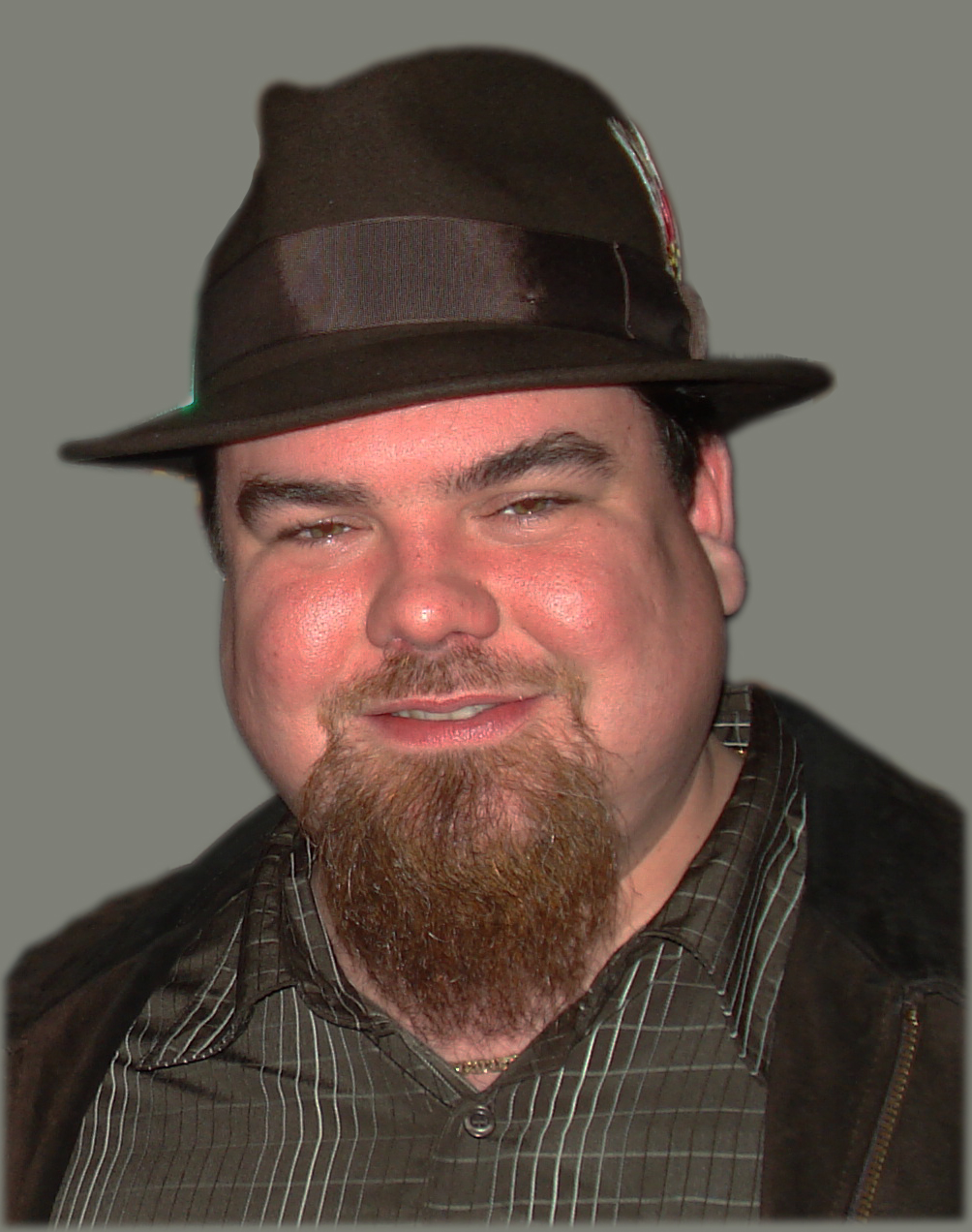

Background information
- Also known as: Slammin Sammon, Chicago's 190 proof keyboardist
- Born: Martin J. Sammon; October 14, 1977; Chicago, Illinois, U.S.
- Died: October 15, 2022 (aged 45) New Orleans, Louisiana, U.S.
- Genres: Chicago blues, electric blues, ragtime, New Orleans jazz
- Occupations: Musician, songwriter, author
- Instruments: Piano, vocals, guitar
- Years active: 1993–2022
- Label: Independent
- Website: www.martysammon.com

Martin J. Sammon (October 14, 1977 – October 15, 2022) was an American blues keyboardist. He was recognized for his energetic performances, improvisation and mastery of traditional styles (ragtime and blues), having established himself as an ambassador of Chicago blues with appearances on several commercially distributed DVDs, television shows (US and in Europe) and Grammy Award-winning albums. His book Blues Keyboard Method, with a foreword by Chuck Leavell, of the Rolling Stones, was published by Hal Leonard in 2015.

== Life and career ==
Born and raised on the South Side of Chicago, in a family with Irish heritage, Sammon began learning to play the piano as a young child. He learned traditional Irish folk songs by ear while listening to records with his father, Martin Sammon Sr., a Chicago police officer. His parents realized that their son was a prodigy son with an ear for music and encouraged him to take piano lessons. He enjoyed the experience but also developed his musical ear by listening to many styles of music. He competed in contests, including the World Championship Old-Time Piano Playing Contest and Festival (winning junior championships in 1994 and 1995).

At the age of 15, he began playing on the Chicago blues scene with the South Side guitarist L.V. Banks. He was under age and was driven to venues by his father.

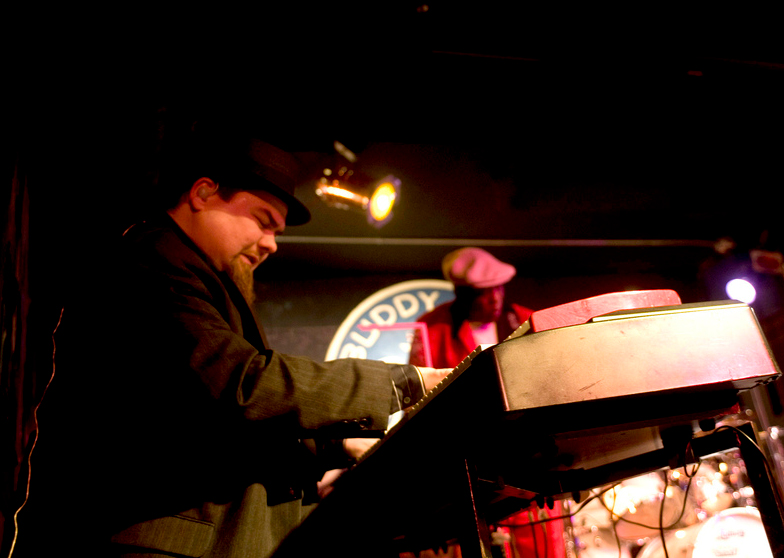
Sammon performing at Buddy Guy's Legends with Buddy Guy

Sammon began receiving calls to play with many Chicago artists, including Phil Guy. He performed and toured with Guy and other blues musicians for years, while also performing headlining gigs, including a tour in Latvia. The turning point of his career came when he played with Guy at the original Checkerboard Lounge during the weekend of the Chicago Blues Festival.

After five years with Otis Rush, in which he played on Rush's 2003 DVD, Live Part One, and on Martin Scorsese Presents the Blues: A Musical Journey (which won Grammy Awards for Best Historical Album and Best Album Notes) - Godfathers and Sons, Sammon was contacted by Phil Guy: "It was late night and I was home when the phone rang. I didn't know the number so I ignored it. My brother Mike convinced me to answer saying that 'that could be THE call!' It was Phil Guy saying that I had the Buddy gig and, by the way, Y'all leave Thursday. I'll be forever grateful to Phil and to my bro for that!"

Sammon performed worldwide with Buddy Guy and as an opening act with his own ensemble, the Marty Sammon Band. He contributed to Guy's sixth Grammy Award–winning album, Living Proof. He also recorded releases under his own name and performed at schools and universities to promote the blues and music career development education.

In September 2015, Sammon made an uncredited appearance on the television program Bizarre Foods with Andrew Zimmern, in the episode "Delicious Destinations—Milwaukee".

On October 14, 2015, Sammon performed with Buddy Guy and Tom Hambridge at the White House for "A Celebration of American Creativity: In Performance at the White House", commemorating the 50th anniversary of the National Endowment for the Humanities.

Sammon's influences included Peter Sliwka, Dr. John, Scott Joplin, Professor Longhair, Keith Jarrett, Chick Corea, Otis Spann, Pinetop Perkins, Ray Charles, Eubie Blake, Fats Waller, Stevie Wonder, Donny Hathaway, Curtis Mayfield, and Bruce Hornsby.

Sammon died on October 15, 2022, at the age of 45.

== Discography ==
Album	Artist	Media	Notes
Live at Legends	Buddy Guy	CD	2012 RCA
Say What You Mean	Phil Guy	CD	2000 JSP Records
Martin Scorsese Presents the Blues: Godfathers and Sons	Various artists	CD	*Grammy Award
Getting There	Quinn Sullivan	CD	2013 Superstar Records
Buddy Guy North Seas Jazz Festival	Buddy Guy	DVD	
Buddy Guy Live in Lugano Switzerland	Buddy Guy	DVD	
Ragged & Dirty	Devon Allman	CD	2014 RUF Records
Eric Clapton Crossroads Guitar Festival	Various artists	DVD	2008 Rhino Entertainment
Eric Clapton Crossroads Guitar Festival	Various artists	DVD	2010
Eric Clapton Crossroads Guitar Festival	Various artists	DVD	2013
Carlos Santana Santana Presents the Blues	Carlos Santana	DVD	2004 Eagle Rock Entertainment
Otis Rush Blues Express	Otis Rush	CD and DVD	1999 Blues Express
Tear This World Up	Eddie C. Campbell	CD	Delmark Artist Performances
Living Proof	Buddy Guy	CD and Album	*Grammy Award Best Contemporary Blues Album, appearance on "Let the Door Knob Hit Ya", produced by Tom Hambridge
Experience Hendrix Tour	Various artists	DVD	2008 Image Entertainment
Robert Randolph Presents the Slide Brothers	Various artists	CD	2012 Dare Records
Jump Start	Lil' Ed Williams and the Blues Imperials	CD	2012 Alligator Records
Do Your Thing!	Michael Coleman	CD	2000 Delmark Records
Stoned Soul	Giles Corey	CD	2014 Delmark Records
What We Are	Rick Simcox	CD	2012 RSTQ Records
Rob Blaine's Big Otis Blues	Rob Blaine	CD	2012 Swississippi Records
Four Aces and a Harp	Swississippi Chris Harper	CD	2010 Swississippi Records
Marty Sammon Band Live	Marty Sammon	CD	2002
Marty Sammon Honky Tonk Piano Party	Marty Sammon	CD	
Marty Sammon Songs Before My Time	Marty Sammon	CD	
Marty Sammon Hound Dog Barkin'	Marty Sammon	CD	2010 (Originals Re-Release)
Marty Sammon Live at Orazio's	Marty Sammon	CD	
Marty Sammon Right At Home	Marty Sammon	CD	
190 Proof Blues	Marty Sammon and Tom Holland	CD	2008 Live performance filmed and aired on WDCB 90.9 FM, with Scott "Hambone" Hammer
