= Rhythm & Blues (Buddy Guy album) =

Studio album by Buddy Guy
- Released: July 30, 2013
- Genre: Blues, soul
- Label: RCA
- Producer: Tom Hambridge

Buddy Guy chronology
Living Proof (2010)	Rhythm & Blues (2013)	Born to Play Guitar (2015)

Professional ratings
Aggregate scores
Source	Rating
Metacritic	72/100
Review scores
Source	Rating
Exclaim!	8/10
AllMusic	3/5 stars
Slant	2/5 stars

Rhythm & Blues is the 16th studio album by American blues musician Buddy Guy. It was released in July 2013 under RCA Records. Rhythm & Blues marked Guy's largest first week sales in the Soundscan Era, and was his fourth album to reach No. 1 on the Top Blues Albums Chart (following 2010's Living Proof, 2008's Skin Deep, and 2001's Sweet Tea).

== Commercial performance ==
The album debuted at No. 27 on the Billboard 200 and No. 1 on the Top Blues Albums chart. selling 10,000 copies in its first week. The album has sold 55,000 copies in the United States as of July 2015.

== Musicians ==
- Buddy Guy - guitar, lead vocals

Guitars
- BG '89 Fender Custom Strat on (A1 to A3, A5, B1 to B3, C2 to C4, D1, D3)
- '54 Fender Strat on (A4, C5, D5)
- Gibson Custom 335 on (B4 to B6, C1, D4)
- Gibson Les Paul (D2)

- Tom Hambridge - drums, background vocals, tambourine (tracks: B4, D1), elephant bells
- Reese Wynans - piano (tracks: C2 to C4, D2), Hammond B3, Wurlitzer (tracks: A3, B3)
- Kevin McKendree - piano (B2, C5, D3, D5), Hammond B3, Wurlitzer (tracks: B1, B4)
- Michael Rhodes - bass (A1 to A3, A5, B6 to C3, D1, D2)
- Tommy McDonald - bass ( A4, B1 to B5, C4, C5, D3 to D5 )
- David Grissom - guitar (A1 to A3, A5, B3, B6 to C3, D1, D2, D4)
- Rob McNelley - guitar (A4, B1, B2, B4, B5, C5, D3, D5), slide guitar (tracks: C5)
- The McCrary Sisters - background Vocals
- Jessica Wagner-Cowan, Herschel Boone, Shannon Kurfmann - background vocals
- Wendy Moten - background vocals
- Muscle Shoals Horns - A5

- Charles Rose - trombone, horn arrangements
- Steve Herrman - trumpet
- Jim Horn - baritone saxophone
- Harvey Thompson - tenor saxophone

=== Guest musicians ===
- Kid Rock - vocals (Note: Kid Rock appears courtesy of Atlantic Recording Corporation)
- Keith Urban - guitar, vocals (Note: Keith Urban appears courtesy Capitol Records Nashville)
- Beth Hart - vocals (Note: Beth Hart appears courtesy Mascot Records)
- Steven Tyler - vocals (Note: Steven Tyler, Joe Perry, and Brad Whitford appears courtesy Columbia Records)
- Joe Perry - guitar
- Brad Whitford - guitar
- Gary Clark, Jr. - guitar, vocals (Note: Gary Clark, Jr. appears courtesy Warner Bros. Records)

== Personnel ==
- Tom Hambridge - Producer
- Chris Carmichael - Strings and string arrangement
- Recorded by Ducky Carlisle at Blackbird Studio in Nashville, Tennessee
- Mixed by Ducky Carlisle and Tom Hambridge at Ice Station Zebra in Boston, Massachusetts

== Track listing ==
Disc One - Rhythm
No.	Title	Writer(s)	Length
1.	"Best in Town"	Buddy Guy, Tom Hambridge, Richard Fleming	4:55
2.	"Justifyin'"	Buddy Guy, Tom Hambridge	3:23
3.	"I Go by Feel"	Tom Hambridge, Gary Nicholson	4:15
4.	"Messin' with the Kid" (featuring Kid Rock)	Mel London	2:33
5.	"What's Up with That Woman"	Tom Hambridge	4:02
6.	"One Day Away" (featuring Keith Urban)	Tom Hambridge, Richard Fleming, Scott Holt	3:44
7.	"Well I Done Got Over It"	Eddie "Guitar Slim" Jones	2:55
8.	"What You Gonna Do About Me" (featuring Beth Hart)	Tom Hambridge, Lee Roy Parnell, Gary Nicholson	4:39
9.	"The Devil's Daughter"	Buddy Guy, Tom Hambridge	5:15
10.	"Whiskey Ghost"	Tom Hambridge, Gary Nicholson	4:36
11.	"Rhythm Inner Groove"	Buddy Guy, Tom Hambridge	0:34

Disc Two - Blues
No.	Title	Writer(s)	Length
1.	"Meet Me in Chicago"	Tom Hambridge, Robert Randolph	3:45
2.	"Too Damn Bad"	Tom Hambridge, Richard Fleming	3:06
3.	"Evil Twin" (featuring Joe Perry, Steven Tyler, Brad Whitford)	Tom Hambridge, Richard Fleming	5:23
4.	"I Could Die Happy"	Tom Hambridge, Richard Fleming	4:13
5.	"Never Gonna Change"	Tom Hambridge, David Gogo	3:20
6.	"All That Makes Me Happy Is the Blues"	Tom Hambridge, Gary Nicholson	4:36
7.	"My Mama Loved Me"	Tom Hambridge, Richard Fleming	3:33
8.	"Blues Don't Care" (featuring Gary Clark, Jr.)	Tom Hambridge, Richard Fleming	3:26
9.	"I Came Up Hard"	Buddy Guy, Tom Hambridge, Richard Fleming	5:28
10.	"Poison Ivy"	Mel London	2:50

== Charts ==
Chart (2013)	Peak position
Belgian Albums (Ultratop Flanders)	106
Belgian Albums (Ultratop Wallonia)	86
French Albums (SNEP)	93
German Albums (Offizielle Top 100)	41
Dutch Albums (Album Top 100)	69
Swedish Albums (Sverigetopplistan)	46
Swiss Albums (Schweizer Hitparade)	12
US Billboard 200	27
US Top Blues Albums (Billboard)	1
US Indie Store Album Sales (Billboard)	5
