= Alone & Acoustic =

Studio album by Buddy Guy & Junior Wells
- Released: 1991
- Genre: Blues
- Label: Alligator
- Producer: Didier Tricard

Alone & Acoustic is an album by the blues musicians Buddy Guy and Junior Wells, released in 1991. It was recorded in 1981, in Paris, France, while the two were touring.

The album has sold more than 100,000 copies. Along with Damn Right, I've Got the Blues, it marked a return to commercial success for Guy.

== Production ==
The album was produced by Didier Tricard. Guy played acoustic Guild guitars and Wells played harmonica; they both sang. Guy wrote three of the songs, including the opening "Give Me My Coat and Shoes". Ten tracks were originally released via an import album.

== Critical reception ==
Professional ratings
Review scores
Source	Rating
AllMusic	3.5/5 stars
Calgary Herald	A
Chicago Tribune	3.5/4 stars
Robert Christgau	(1-star Honorable Mention)
The Encyclopedia of Popular Music	4/5 stars
MusicHound R&B: The Essential Album Guide	4/5 stars
Orlando Sentinel	3/5 stars
The Penguin Guide to Blues Recordings	3.5/4 stars
The Rolling Stone Album Guide	3.5/5 stars
Syracuse Herald American	3.5/4 stars

Rolling Stone called Alone & Acoustic "reflective and subdued," writing that "a warm spontaneity runs through the album." Robert Christgau praised ""High Heel Sneakers" and "Give Me My Coat and Shoes".

The Orlando Sentinel determined that Guy's playing "on 12-and six-string acoustics is uncomplicated but as awesome as any daredevil run he has played on his Stratocaster." The Chicago Tribune thought that "the extroverted Guy now sounds like a soft, lyrical Mississippi bluesman virtually singing to himself … Wells remains a strong, dramatic, post-Muddy Waters singer, but the intimacy of the setting leads to his widening his already impressive dynamic range."

AllMusic wrote that "this is acoustic street-corner blues at its best, performed with incredible expressiveness, ease, and joy."

== Track listing ==
No.	Title	Writer(s)	Length
1.	"Give Me My Coat and Shoes"	Buddy Guy	3:49
2.	"Big Boat (Buddy and Junior's Thing)"	Junior Wells	5:13
3.	"Sweet Black Girl"	Buddy Guy	3:32
4.	"Diggin' My Potatoes"	Ernest Lawlars (Little Sunny Joe)	4:28
5.	"Don't Leave Me"	Buddy Guy	3:43
6.	"Rollin' and Tumblin'"	Hambone Willie Newbern	4:33
7.	"I'm in the Mood"	John Lee Hooker; Bernard Besman	3:22
8.	"High Heel Sneakers"	Robert Higginbotham	4:56
9.	"Wrong Doing Woman"	Junior Wells	2:59
10.	"Cut You Loose"	Mel London	4:03
11.	"Sally Mae"	John Lee Hooker; Bernard Besman	2:30
12.	"Catfish Blues"	Robert Petway	3:33
13.	"My Home's in the Delta"	McKinley Morganfield	3:05
14.	"Boogie Chillen"	John Lee Hooker; Bernard Besman	4:00
15.	"Medley: Baby What You Want Me to Do/That's All Right"	Jimmy Reed / Arthur Crudup	5:44
Total length:			59:30
