= Martin Spitznagel =

- Born: Martin Spitznagel; 1982 (age 43–44)
- Genre: Old-time piano
- Occupations: Songwriter, performer
- Instrument: Piano
- Years active: 1997–present
- Label: Rivermont Records
- Website: martinspitznagel.com

Martin Spitznagel is an American old-time pianist known for his clean and fast stride piano arrangements.

Spitznagel's career began at the age 14, when he won Calliope Media's "Crazy For Ragtime" competition in 1996 and 1997. He took home the grand prize, which was a Yamaha Disklavier Upright Piano, and he has continued to play ragtime and old-time piano music professionally every since.

== Career ==
Since the beginning of Martin Spitznagel's career in 1997, he has been very successful in the world of professional old-time piano. In 2007, he won the New Rag Contest of the World Championship Old-Time Piano Playing Contest for his composition entitled: "The Red Elephant Rag." In 2010, he won the Scott Joplin Composition Contest for his original composition, "The Train Town Rag," in honor of the town of Sedalia, Missouri. In 2011, he won the Regular Division and again New Rag Contest of the World Championship Old-Time Piano Playing Contest in Peoria, Illinois. He won the New Rag Contest of the World Championship Old-Time Piano Playing Contest for his original composition, "The Smoky Rose." In 2017, he once again won the New Rag Contest of the World Championship Old-Time Piano Playing Contest for his original piece, "Dreams of Irene." In 2021, he won the composition contest "To The Max," in honor of renowned ragtime pianist Max Morath. In addition to all of these awards, he has played with many popular ragtime pianists including: Brian Holland, Adam Swanson, and many more.

== Albums ==
Album	Artist(s)	Year	Notes
Tricky Fingers	Martin Spitznagel	2007	
Star Wars: Cantina Band in Ragtime	Martin Spitznagel and Bryan Wright	2011	Single
Handful of Keys	Martin Spitznagel	2011	
Three's Company	Martin Spitznagel, Brian Holland, and Danny Coots	2014	
Friend Like Me	Martin Spitznagel and Bryan Wright	2014	Single, a Ragtime Cover of "Friend Like Me" from Disney's Aladdin
Melt Into You: A Ragtime Romance	Martin Spitznagel	2019	Single
Maple Leaf Rag (Live)	Martin Spitznagel	2020	Single, a recording of Spitznagel's performance of the Maple Leaf Rag at the 2011 edition of the World Championship Old-Time Piano Playing Contest
