= Buddy's Baddest: The Best of Buddy Guy =

Greatest hits album by Buddy Guy
- Released: June 15, 1999
- Genre: Blues
- Length: 65:45
- Label: Silvertone

Buddy Guy chronology
Heavy Love (1998)	Buddy's Baddest: The Best of Buddy Guy (1999)	The Complete Vanguard Recordings (2000)

Professional ratings
Review scores
Source	Rating
AllMusic	3/5 stars
The Penguin Guide to Blues Recordings	3/4 stars

Buddy's Baddest: The Best of Buddy Guy is a blues compilation album by Buddy Guy. It was released in 1999 and contains his greatest hits. The album peaked at No. 7 on the Top Blues Albums chart in 1999.

== Track listing ==
All tracks composed by Buddy Guy; except where indicated

1. "Damn Right, I've Got the Blues" - 4:33
2. "Five Long Years" (Eddie Boyd, John Lee Hooker) - 8:29
3. "Mustang Sally" (Sir Mack Rice) - 4:49
4. "Rememberin' Stevie" - 7:01
5. "She's a Superstar" - 5:06
6. "Feels Like Rain" (John Hiatt) - 4:39
7. "She's Nineteen Years Old" (Muddy Waters) -5:47
8. "I Smell Trouble" (Don Robey) - 3:19
9. "Someone Else Is Steppin' In (Slippin' Out, Slippin' In)" (Denise LaSalle) - 4:28
10. "My Time After Awhile" (Ron Badger, Sheldon Feinberg, Robert Geddins) - 7:45
11. "Midnight Train" (featuring Jonny Lang) (Roger Reale, Jon Tiven) - 5:23
12. "Miss Ida B" (Roosevelt Sykes) - 6:33
13. "Need Your Love So Bad" (Little Willie John, Mertis John Jr.) - 2:58
14. "Innocent Man/Mannish Boy/Backdoor Man" - 5:47
