= Five Long Years =

Blues standard written by Eddie Boyd

Single by Eddie Boyd
- B-side: "Blue Coat Man"
- Released: July 1952
- Recorded: May–June 1952
- Studio: Modern Recording, Chicago
- Genre: Blues
- Length: 2:41
- Label: J.O.B.
- Songwriter(s): Eddie Boyd

"Five Long Years" is a song written and recorded by blues vocalist and pianist Eddie Boyd in 1952. Called one of the "few postwar blues standards [that has] retained universal appeal", Boyd's "Five Long Years" reached number one on the Billboard R&B chart. Numerous blues and other artists have recorded interpretations of the song.

== Original song ==
"Five Long Years" is a moderate-tempo twelve-bar blues notated in 12/8 time in the key of C. It tells of "the history of the metal worker who, for five years, worked hard in a factory and who gave his check every Friday night to his girlfriend, who nevertheless dumped him". Backing Boyd on vocal and piano are Ernest Cotton on tenor sax, L. C. McKinley on guitar, Alfred Elkins on bass, and Percy Walker on drums. "Five Long Years" was revisited by Boyd several times during his career, with additional studio and live recordings.

== Recognition and legacy ==
In 2011, Eddie Boyd's original "Five Long Years" was inducted into the Blues Foundation Hall of Fame, who called it "a true-to-life blues in 1952 that hit home with many a working man".

A variety of artists have recorded "Five Long Years", including Junior Parker, whose version reached number 13 in the R&B chart in 1959. Eric Clapton recorded it first in 1964 as part of The Yardbirds (on Five Live Yardbirds) and again 30 years later on From the Cradle. Likewise, B. B. King recorded the song twice in the studio (released on The Jungle and Guess Who). Buddy Guy also recorded it twice with Junior Wells (on Coming At You and Buddy and the Juniors) and later on Damn Right, I've Got The Blues.
