= Sweet Tea (album) =

Studio album by Buddy Guy
- Released: May 15, 2001
- Studio: Sweet Tea, Oxford, Mississippi
- Genre: Blues
- Length: 54:20
- Label: Silvertone/Jive
- Producer: Dennis Herring

Buddy Guy chronology
| Slippin' In (1994) | Sweet Tea (2001) | Blues Singer (2003) |

Professional ratings
Review scores
| Source | Rating |
|---|---|
| AllMusic | 4.5/5 stars |
| Robert Christgau | A− |
| The Penguin Guide to Blues Recordings | + "Crown" |
| Rolling Stone | 4/5 stars |

Sweet Tea is the 11th studio album by American blues artist Buddy Guy, released in 2001 on Silvertone/Jive label. It was nominated for 2001 Grammy Award for Best Contemporary Blues Album. It includes four songs by Junior Kimbrough, who had died in 1998.

== Track listing ==
| No. | Title | Writer(s) | Length |
|---|---|---|---|
| 1. | "Done Got Old" | Junior Kimbrough | 3:23 |
| 2. | "Baby Please Don't Leave Me" | Junior Kimbrough | 7:24 |
| 3. | "Look What All You Got" | James Ford | 4:45 |
| 4. | "Stay All Night" | Junior Kimbrough | 4:10 |
| 5. | "Tramp" | Lowell Fulson, Jimmy McCracklin | 6:47 |
| 6. | "She Got the Devil in Her" | CeDell Davis | 5:10 |
| 7. | "I Gotta Try You Girl" | Junior Kimbrough | 12:09 |
| 8. | "Who's Been Foolin' You" | Robert Cage | 4:55 |
| 9. | "It's a Jungle Out There" | Buddy Guy | 5:37 |

== Personnel ==
- Buddy Guy – vocals, guitar
- Davey Faragher – bass
- Tommy Lee Miles – Drums
- James "Jimbo" Mathus – Rhythm guitar

Additional musicians and production

- Sam Carr – drums
- Dennis Herring – producer, mixing
- Clay Jones – mixing
- Craig Krampf – percussion
- Doug Sax – mastering
- Chris Shepard – engineer, mixing on "I Gotta Try You Girl"
- Pete Thomas – drums
- Bobby Whitlock – piano

== Charts ==
| Chart (2001) | Peak position |
|---|---|
| French Albums (SNEP) | 79 |
| US Billboard 200 | 162 |
| US Blues Albums | 1 |

| Chart (2026) | Peak position |
|---|---|
| Australian Jazz & Blues Albums (ARIA) | 8 |
