= Blues News =

Finnish music magazine

- Chief editor: Petri Hoppula
- Categories: Music magazine
- Frequency: Bi-monthly
- First issue: 12 July 1968
- Country: Finland
- Based in: Helsinki
- Language: Finnish
- Website: www.bluesnews.fi
- ISSN: 0784-7726

Blues News is a bi-monthly Finnish blues and roots music magazine.

== History and profile ==
Blues News was founded in 1968, making it one of the oldest blues magazines still in print in the world. The magazine is published by Finnish Blues Society (FBS ry). The FBS is a non-profitable association, sponsored by the Ministry of Culture and the City of Helsinki. The name of the society was changed to Suomen afroamerikkalaisen musiikin yhdistys (SAMY ry) in 1980. In 2006, the name reverted to the original FBS. The Society has its own record label, Blue North Records.
