= Crossroads Guitar Festival 2013 =

- Film poster
- Directed by: Martyn Atkins
- Produced by: John Beug · Tom Case · Eric Clapton · Michael Eaton · James S. Pluta · Joel Weinstein · Stephen Weintraub
- Starring: Eric Clapton
- Cinematography: Jürg V. Walther
- Edited by: Joe D'Augustine · Erick Yablon
- Production company: Madison Square Garden
- Distributed by: NCM Fathom · Film1 Sundance Channel
- Release date: November 18, 2013 (United States)
- Running time: 250 minutes
- Country: United States
- Language: English

Crossroads Guitar Festival 2013 is a music DVD, concert film and eleventh live album by the British rock musician Eric Clapton and was released on November 18, 2013, through Warner Bros. Records. It features recordings by various artists that performed during the Crossroads Guitar Festival 2013. The release reached international album, DVD and Blu-ray charts and was certified by various organisations with gold and platinum awards.

== Title list on CD ==
1. Tears in Heaven (Eric Clapton/Will Jennings): Eric Clapton - 4:49
2. Lay Down Sally (Eric Clapton/Marcy Levy/George Terry): Eric Clapton & Vince Gill - 4:39
3. Green Onions (Booker T. Jones, Jr./Stephen Lee Cropper/Alan Jackson Jr./Lewis Steinberg): Booker T. Jones, Steve Cropper, Keb' Mo', Blake Mills, Matt "Guitar" Murphy & Albert Lee - 7:26
4. Heavenly Bodies (Kurt Rosenwinkel): Kurt Rosenwinkel - 5:24
5. This Time (Earl Klugh): Earl Klugh - 2.13
6. Mirabella (Earl Klugh): Earl Klugh - 1:17
7. Great Big Old House (Robert Cray): "The Robert Cray Band" - 5:32
8. She´s Alright (McKinley Morganfield): Doyle Bramhall II & Gary Clark Jr. - 6:16
9. Bullet And A Target (Clarence Copeland Greenwood): Doyle Bramhall II & Citizen Cope - 4:14
10. Queen of California (John Mayer): John Mayer - 8:17
11. Don't Let Me Down (John Lennon/Paul McCartney): John Mayer & Keith Urban - 6:45
12. Next Door Neighbor Blues (Gary Clark Jr.): Gary Clark Jr. - 4:02
13. Damn Right, I've Got The Blues (Buddy Guy): Buddy Guy & Robert Randolph & Quinn Sullivan - 6:39
14. Why Does Love Got To Be So Sad (Eric Clapton/Bobby Whitlock): The Allman Brothers Band & Eric Clapton - 8:25
15. Congo Square (Sonny Landreth/Mel Melton/Dave Raonson): Sonny Landreth & Derek Trucks - 6:57
16. Change It (Doyle Bramhall II): John Mayer & Doyle Bramhall II - 4:36
17. Oooh-Ooh-Ooh (Lloyd Price): Jimmie Vaughan - 4:52
18. Save the Last Dance for Me (Doc Pomus/Mort Shuman): Blake Mills & Derek Trucks - 3:30
19. Don't Worry Baby (César Rosas/Louis Pérez/T. Bone Burnett): Los Lobos - 3:41
20. I Ain't Living Long Like This (Rodney Crowell): Vince Gill & Albert Lee - 6:25
21. Diving Duck Blues (John Adam Estes): Taj Mahal & Keb' Mo' - 4:58
22. When My Train Pulls In (Gary Clark Jr.): Gary Clark Jr. - 9:00
23. Mná Na Héireann (Sean O'Riada): Jeff Beck - 4:21
24. The Needle And The Damage Done (Neil Young): Gregg Allman, Warren Haynes, Derek Trucks - 2:38
25. Midnight Rider (Gregg Allman/Robert Kim Payne): Gregg Allman, Warren Haynes, Derek Trucks - 3:33
26. Key To The Highway (William Lee Conley Broonzy/Charles Segar): Eric Clapton & Keith Richards - 4:35
27. Gin House Blues (Henry Troy/Fletcher Henderson): Andy Fairwather Low & Eric Clapton - 5:48
28. Got To Get Better In A Little While (Eric Clapton): Eric Clapton - 6:35
29. Sunshine of Your Love (Jack Bruce/Peter Ronald Brown/Eric Clapton): Eric Clapton - 6:24

== Chart performance ==
=== Album release ===
==== Weekly charts ====
Chart (2013–2014)	Peak position
Austrian Albums (Ö3 Austria)	63
Belgian Albums (Ultratop Flanders)	101
Belgian Albums (Ultratop Wallonia)	76
Croatian International Albums (HDU)	14
French Albums (SNEP)	74
German Albums (Offizielle Top 100)	5
Hungarian Albums (MAHASZ)	32
Italian Albums (FIMI)	60
Swiss Albums (Schweizer Hitparade)	50

=== Video concert ===
==== Weekly charts ====
Chart (2013–2015)	Peak position
Australian DVD Albums (ARIA)	2
Austrian Music DVD (Ö3 Austria)	3
Belgian Music DVD (Ultratop Flanders)	2
Belgian Music DVD (Ultratop Wallonia)	2
Danish Music DVD (Hitlisten)	1
Dutch Music DVD (MegaCharts)	1
Finnish Music Blu-ray (Suomen virallinen lista)	1
Finnish Music DVD (Suomen virallinen lista)	5
French Music DVD (SNEP)	1
Italian Music DVD (FIMI)	1
Japanese Music Blu-ray (Oricon)	19
Japanese Music DVD (Oricon)	39
Swedish Music DVD (Sverigetopplistan)	1
Swiss Music DVD (Schweizer Hitparade)	2
US Music Video DVD (Billboard)	1

==== Year-end charts ====
Chart (2013)	Peak position
Australian Music DVD (ARIA)	18

== Certifications ==
Region	Certification	Certified units/sales
Brazil (Pro-Música Brasil)	Gold	15,000^{*}
Canada (Music Canada)	Platinum	10,000^{^}
Germany (BVMI)	Gold	25,000^{^}
United States (RIAA)	Platinum	100,000^{^}
^{*} Sales figures based on certification alone.^{^} Shipments figures based on certification alone.
