= Heavy Love (Buddy Guy album) =

Studio album by Buddy Guy
- Released: 1998
- Genre: Blues, blues rock
- Length: 57:01
- Label: Silvertone
- Producer: David Z

Buddy Guy chronology
As Good As It Gets (1998)	Heavy Love (1998)	Buddy's Baddest: The Best of Buddy Guy (1999)

Heavy Love is an album by the American blues musician Buddy Guy, released in 1998. It was nominated for a Grammy Award for "Best Contemporary Blues Album".

The album peaked at No. 163 on the Billboard 200.

== Production ==
Produced by David Z, the album was recorded in Nashville. In an attempt to get the album played on popular radio, Guy added synthetic drums and tape loops to some tracks.

Jonny Lang duets with Guy on the album's lead single, "Midnight Train". On the Tony Joe White cover, "Did Somebody Make a Fool Out of You," Guy uses a Gibson acoustic guitar.

== Critical reception ==
Professional ratings
Review scores
Source	Rating
The Age	4/4 stars
AllMusic	2.5/5 stars
Robert Christgau	(3-star Honorable Mention)
The Encyclopedia of Popular Music	3/5 stars
Entertainment Weekly	B+
The Hamilton Spectator	3.5/4 stars
The Penguin Guide to Blues Recordings	2/4 stars
(The New) Rolling Stone Album Guide	3/5 stars

Entertainment Weekly wrote that the album focuses on "tight songs, concise, off-kilter solos, funk-tinged grooves, and impassioned vocals." The Daily Herald called "Did Somebody Make a Fool Outta You" "a mesmerizing piece of fretwork and utter soul." The Chicago Tribune opined that "the methodical finale, 'Let Me Show You', showcases the singer's soft, tearful, underrated voice." The Hamilton Spectator noted that "a Buddy Guy album is the only place where the volume faders are often turned down to 2 rather than consistently bombarding your ears at 11."

AllMusic thought that "purists will cringe at the unabashed commercial concessions," but acknowledged that "Heavy Love works well when compared to the modern electric blues of the post-Stevie Ray Vaughan era, especially since Guy once again contributes some scorching solos." (The New) Rolling Stone Album Guide deemed the album "refreshingly modern, if uneven."

== Track listing ==
No.	Title	Writer(s)	Length
1.	"Heavy Love"	Dan Penn, Jon Tiven, Sally Tiven	5:39
2.	"Midnight Train"	J. Tiven, Roger Reale	5:21
3.	"I Got a Problem"	Gene Barge, Jesse Anderson	5:17
4.	"I Need You Tonight"	Billy Gibbons, Dusty Hill, Frank Beard	5:17
5.	"Saturday Night Fish Fry"	Louis Jordan, Walsh Ellis Lawrence	5:29
6.	"Had a Bad Night"	Buddy Guy	4:43
7.	"Are You Lonely for Me Baby"	Bert Berns	3:55
8.	"I Just Want to Make Love to You"	Willie Dixon	3:25
9.	"Did Somebody Make a Fool Out of You"	Tony Joe White	7:49
10.	"When the Time Is Right"	Steve Cropper, Glen Clark	4:32
11.	"Let Me Show You"	Guy	5:34

== Personnel ==
- Buddy Guy – guitar, vocals
- Jack Holder – guitar
- Reese Wynans – keyboards
- David M. Smith – bass guitar
- Richie Hayward – drums
- David Z – percussion
- Jonny Lang – guitar, vocals (track 2)
- Steve Cropper – guitar (tracks 1, 5, 7 to 11)
