= Blues Singer =

Studio album by Buddy Guy
- Released: 2003
- Studios: Sweet Tea, Oxford, Mississippi
- Genre: Blues
- Length: 49:25
- Label: Silvertone
- Producer: Dennis Herring

Buddy Guy chronology
Sweet Tea (2001)	Blues Singer (2003)	Bring 'Em In (2005)

Blues Singer is the 12th studio album by Buddy Guy released in 2003 through Silvertone Records.

The album is all acoustic and dedicated to John Lee Hooker with the line, "In Memory of John Lee Hooker. You are missed."

== Background ==
The album was created as a tribute to Muddy Waters' acoustic album Folk Singer. B.B. King and Eric Clapton made guest appearances on "Crawling King Snake", with Clapton also playing guitar on "Lucy Mae Blues". Following the previous album Sweet Tea (2001), Dennis Herring, who had worked on recordings by artists such as Counting Crows, was again appointed as the producer.

== Reception ==
Professional ratings
Review scores
Source	Rating
AllMusic	2/5 stars
Robert Christgau	(1-star Honorable Mention)
Rolling Stone	2/5 stars
The Penguin Guide to Blues Recordings	2.5/4 stars

On the Billboard 200, the album peaked at number 188 on June 21, 2003, but fell out of the top 200 the following week. It reached number 3 on Billboard's Blues Albums chart and number 12 on the Top Heatseekers chart.

At the 46th Annual Grammy Awards, the album won the Grammy Award for Best Traditional Blues Album. Stephen Thomas Erlewine, writing for AllMusic, stated that while Sweet Tea (2001) was filled with unexpectedly raw energy, Blues Singer (2003), by contrast, placed a strong emphasis on acoustic elements rather than the powerful, gritty electric blues of its predecessor. He also noted that although Guy had previously recorded strong acoustic sessions with Junior Wells, acoustic blues could not be considered his defining strength.

== Track listing ==
No.	Title	Writer(s)	Length
1.	"Hard Time Killing Floor"	Nehemiah Curtis "Skip" James	2:49
2.	"Crawling King Snake"	John Lee Hooker, Bernard Bosman	5:17
3.	"Lucy Mae Blues"	Frankie Lee Sims	3:34
4.	"Can't See Baby"	Jack Nelson Owens	4:05
5.	"I Love the Life I Live"	Willie Dixon	2:47
6.	"Louise McGhee"	Son House	5:24
7.	"Moanin' and Groanin'"	Johnny Shines	3:30
8.	"Black Cat Blues"	John Lee Hooker, Bernard Bosman	4:30
9.	"Bad Life Blues"	Andrew Hogg, Joe Josen	3:45
10.	"Sally Mae"	John Lee Hooker	4:25
11.	"Anna Lee"	Robert "Nighthawk" McCollum	4:15
12.	"Lonesome Home Blues"	Willie Borum	5:00

== Personnel ==
Musicians

- Buddy Guy – guitar, vocals
- Jimbo Mathus – guitar
- Jim Keltner – drums
- Tony Garnier – upright bass
- Eric Clapton – lead guitar on tracks 2, 3
- B. B. King – lead guitar on track 2
- The Perrys – snaps and handclaps

Production

- Dennis Herring – producer
