= Skin Deep (Buddy Guy album) =

Studio album by Buddy Guy
- Released: 22 July 2008
- Recorded: Blackbird, Nashville, TN
- Genres: Chicago blues, electric blues
- Length: 58:09
- Labels: Silvertone, Jive
- Producer: Tom Hambridge

Buddy Guy chronology
Bring 'Em In (2005)	Skin Deep (2008)	Living Proof (2010)

Skin Deep is the 14th studio album by blues musician Buddy Guy, released in 2008. The album features a number of collaborations including: Eric Clapton, Derek Trucks, Susan Tedeschi, and Robert Randolph.

== Background ==
Buddy Guy said he was inspired to write the song "Skin Deep" after reuniting with a white childhood friend whose parents had cut off their relationship as teens. He has also stated that the inspiration came from his mother who used to tell him that 'beauty is only skin deep.'

== Reception ==
Professional ratings
Review scores
Source	Rating
About.com	4.5/5 stars
AllMusic	3.5/5 stars
People	3/5 stars

People praised Guy's guitar work saying that there was "...no doubt that Buddy is still the man here." CD Universe did much the same by writing "...he wails and shreds here with as much passion as ever." and "...Guy still plays and sings like the urban blues monster he remains." AllMusic criticized the production for being too pristine, saying that the album "gleams too brightly" in some parts. The album received a Grammy nomination for Best Traditional Blues Album. The album debuted at number 68 on the Billboard 200, the highest position of any of Guy's previous albums. It also debuted at number 1 on the Blues Albums chart and remained at the top spot for three weeks and remained on the chart for 65 weeks.

== Track listing ==
No.	Title	Writer(s)	Length
1.	"Best Damn Fool"	Buddy Guy, Tom Hambridge	4:57
2.	"Too Many Tears" (feat. Derek Trucks & Susan Tedeschi)	Tom Hambridge	4:25
3.	"Lyin' Like a Dog"	Buddy Guy, Tom Hambridge	7:27
4.	"Show Me The Money"	Buddy Guy, Tom Hambridge	3:09
5.	"Every Time I Sing The Blues" (feat. Eric Clapton)	Tom Hambridge, Gary Nicholson	7:37
6.	"Out in the Woods" (feat. Robert Randolph)	Buddy Guy, Tom Hambridge	5:43
7.	"Hammer and a Nail"	Buddy Guy	2:57
8.	"That's My Home" (feat. Robert Randolph)	Tom Hambridge, Richard Fleming	2:52
9.	"Skin Deep" (feat. Derek Trucks)	Buddy Guy, Tom Hambridge, Gary Nicholson	4:29
10.	"Who's Gonna Fill Those Shoes"	Tom Hambridge, Gary Nicholson	4:08
11.	"Smell The Funk"	Tom Hambridge	4:46
12.	"I Found Happiness"	Buddy Guy	5:39

== Personnel ==
=== Musicians ===
- Buddy Guy - guitar, sitar, vocals

Guitars

'57 Stratocaster on track 1
Jerry Jones sitar on tracks 2 & 9
Gibson ES-335 Custom on track 3
'74 Telecaster on tracks 4 & 8
BG Stratocaster on tracks 5, 7, 10 & 11
Gibson Custom 335 on track 6
Eric Clapton Stratocaster on track 12

- Marc Franklin - trumpet
- David Grissom - guitar
- Tom Hambridge - drums, handclaps, tambourine, percussion, vocals, backing vocals
- Richie Hayward - drums
- Rob McNelly - guitar
- Quinn Sullivan - guitar
- Willie Weeks - bass
- Nathan Williams - accordion
- Reese Wynans - keyboards
- Lannie McMillan - tenor saxophone
- Kirk Smothers - tenor saxophone
- Bekka Bramlett, Bonnie Bramlett & Wendy Moten - backing vocals

=== Guest musicians ===
- Eric Clapton - guitar, vocals
- Robert Randolph - steel guitar, pedal steel
- Susan Tedeschi - vocals
- Derek Trucks - slide guitar, guitar

== Charts ==
Chart performance for Skin Deep
Chart (2008)	Peak position
Canadian Albums (Nielsen SoundScan)	42
French Albums (SNEP)	99
Swiss Albums (Schweizer Hitparade)	42
UK Jazz & Blues Albums (Official Charts)	18
US Billboard 200	68
US Top Blues Albums (Billboard)	1
