= Slippin' In =

Studio album by Buddy Guy
- Released: October 25, 1994
- Studios: Arlyn (Austin); CRC (Chicago)
- Length: 49:39
- Label: Silvertone
- Producer: Eddie Kramer

Buddy Guy chronology
Feels Like Rain (1993)	Slippin' In (1994)	Live: The Real Deal (1996)

Slippin' In is the ninth studio album by Buddy Guy, released in 1994 through Silvertone Records. The album earned Guy the Grammy Award for Best Contemporary Blues Album.

== Background ==
Among Guy's original compositions, "Man of Many Words" is a re-recording of a track first released on the 1972 album with Junior Wells, Play the Blues. Tommy Shannon and Chris Layton, who previously performed with Stevie Ray Vaughan, provided the rhythm section on approximately half of the album's tracks.

== Reception ==
Professional ratings
Review scores
Source	Rating
AllMusic	4/5 stars
Chicago Tribune	3.5/4 stars
Robert Christgau	(1-star Honorable Mention)
The Penguin Guide to Blues Recordings	3/4 stars

In his home country of the United States, the album reached number 180 on the Billboard 200, number 5 on Billboard's Top Heatseekers chart, and number 10 on the Blues Albums chart. At the 38th Annual Grammy Awards, it won the Grammy Award for Best Contemporary Blues Album, marking his third Grammy Award win.

Daniel Gioffre of AllMusic stated that while Buddy Guy appeared to be experimenting with pop and R&B material on Feels Like Rain in 1993, he reaffirmed his true blues roots on the following year's Slippin' In.

== Track listing ==
No.	Title	Writer(s)	Length
1.	"I Smell Trouble"	Don Robey	3:12
2.	"Please Don't Drive Me Away"	Jesse Ervin, Charles Brown	3:55
3.	"7-11"	Fenton Robinson	6:57
4.	"Shame, Shame, Shame"	Jimmy Reed	3:29
5.	"Love Her with a Feeling"	Lowell Fulson	4:27
6.	"Little Dab-a-Doo"	Buddy Guy	5:19
7.	"Someone Else Is Steppin' In (Slippin' Out, Slippin' In)"	Denise LaSalle	4:26
8.	"Trouble Blues"	Charley Brown	3:07
9.	"Man of Many Words"	Buddy Guy	3:02
10.	"Don't Tell Me About the Blues"	James Quinn	6:16
11.	"Cities Need Help"	Buddy Guy	5:29

== Musicians ==
- Buddy Guy – Lead Guitar, vocals
- David Grissom – Guitar (tracks: 1, 2, 4, 11), acoustic guitar on 8, slide guitar on 9
- Scott Holt – Guitar (tracks: 3, 5 to 7, 10)
- Reese Wynans – Piano, organ (tracks: 1, 2, 4, 7 to 9, 11)
- Johnnie Johnson – Piano
- Tommy Shannon – Bass (tracks: 1, 2, 4, 8, 9, 11)
- Greg Rzab – Bass
- Chris Layton – Drums (tracks: 1, 2, 4, 8, 9, 11)
- Ray Allison – Drums
- "Slippin' Out" Singers – Suzanne Maso, Emily Maso, Monica Maso, Carey Reisz, Anne Markovich, Kelley Flynn, Hillary Faeta, Brian Moravec, Bill Potocki, "Crazy" Dave Komie, L. Daniel Roman, Rob "Skoalie O" Davis, Buffy Holt, Davin Reddington, JC Clements, Jason Blankenship, Annette McKeee, Frank Blinkal, Mike Homberger, Garrett Mudd, Buddy Guy Band, "Blind Willie" Lambchop, and Lily Angela Maso
