= Buddy Guy's Legends =

Blues club in Chicago, Illinois, United States

- Legends
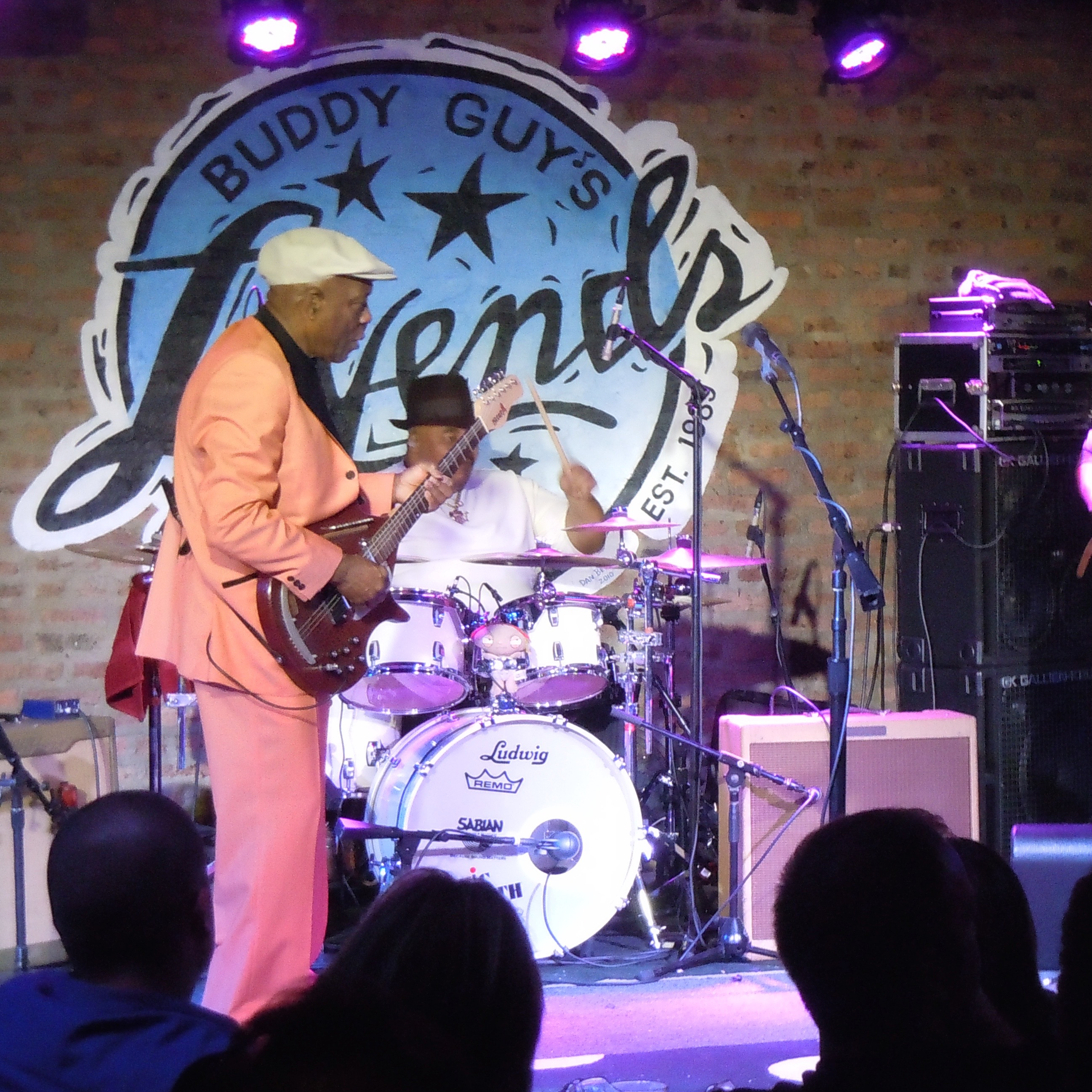
- Guy on stage at Legends in 2011
- Interactive map of Buddy Guy's Legends
- Address: 700 S. Wabash
- Location: Chicago, Illinois
- Coordinates: 41.872971°N 87.626211°W
- Owner: Buddy Guy
- Seating type: cafe tables + SRO
- Capacity: 500
- Events: Blues, Chicago Blues

Construction
- Opened: 1989

Website
- buddyguy.com

Buddy Guy's Legends is a blues club in Chicago, Illinois. It was opened in 1989 by blues musician Buddy Guy who still owns the club and makes regular appearances, performing a month of shows each January.

Legends is one of the few blues clubs left in Chicago, a city renowned for its own particular brand of blues. The club has hosted blues greats such as Stevie Ray Vaughan, and Guy himself. Legends has developed an international reputation. It was the site for recordings such as Guy's Live at Legends, Junior Wells: Live at Buddy Guy's Legends, and Guy's live set with Junior Wells entitled Last Time Around - Live at Legends.

Each year, Legends hosts the annual Chicago Blues Hall of Fame induction celebration.

== History ==
Prior to his death in 1983, Muddy Waters made Guy promise to "keep Blues alive". Guy says that Legends is part of keeping that promise.

Guy, who had previously co-owned the Checkerboard Lounge on the south side from 1972 until 1985, first opened Legends at 754 South Wabash inside the Loop, behind the Big Hilton on Michigan Avenue, hoping to attract convention attendees from the Hilton. Legends moved to its current location at 700 South Wabash in 2010.

Over the years, the club has been decorated with Guy's collection of blues memorabilia.

In 2013 Legends became one of the only blues clubs to offer livestreaming concerts.

In 2015, the Rolling Stones visited the club.

Legends is also a restaurant. It serves a menu of Louisiana style Cajun and Soul food including gumbo, jambalaya, chicken and ribs, and catfish po'boys. Legends is the only place to serve Guy's craft beer "Buddy Brew".
