= Feels Like Rain =

Studio album by Buddy Guy
- Released: March 9, 1993
- Studios: Red Zone, Burbank, California; with additional recordings at Battery (New York, NY), Pacifique (Hollywood, CA), The Nut Ranch (Los Angeles, CA) and The Clubhouse
- Genre: Blues
- Length: 47:55
- Label: Silvertone
- Producers: John Porter, Dave McNair and R. S. Field.

Buddy Guy chronology
Damn Right, I've Got the Blues (1991)	Feels Like Rain (1993)	Slippin' In (1994)

Feels Like Rain is the eighth studio album by Buddy Guy, released in 1993 through Silvertone Records. The title track was written by John Hiatt and also appears on his album Slow Turning, released in 1988.

Most of the album was produced by John Porter, with the exception of "I Could Cry", produced by Dave McNair and R.S. Field.

== Background ==
The title track is a cover of a John Hiatt song, featuring guest vocals and slide guitar by Bonnie Raitt. Hiatt's original version appeared on his 1988 album Slow Turning. Other guest vocalists on the album include Paul Rodgers, Travis Tritt, and John Mayall. Additionally, Ian McLagan, known as a former member of the Small Faces and Faces, also participated in the recording sessions.

== Reception ==
Professional ratings
Review scores
Source	Rating
AllMusic	2.5/5 stars
Robert Christgau	(choice cut)
The Penguin Guide to Blues Recordings	3/4 stars
Rolling Stone	4/5 stars

In his home country of the United States, the album reached number 145 on the Billboard 200 and number 4 on Billboard's Top Heatseekers chart. At the 36th Annual Grammy Awards, it won the Grammy Award for Best Contemporary Blues Album, marking his second Grammy win.

In the United Kingdom, the album spent four weeks in the Top 100 of the UK Albums Chart, becoming his second album to enter the UK Top 100 and peaking at number 36. After this release, he did not achieve another UK chart hit until the 2015 album Born to Play Guitar reached the Top 100.

Daniel Gioffre, writing for AllMusic, noted that while the overall production felt somewhat thin and many tracks lacked sufficient punch, the album was still "quite powerful."

== Track listing ==
No.	Title	Writer(s)	Length
1.	"She's a Superstar"	Buddy Guy	5:04
2.	"I Go Crazy"	James Brown	2:26
3.	"Feels Like Rain"	John Hiatt	4:38
4.	"She's Nineteen Years Old"	McKinley Morganfield	5:43
5.	"Some Kind of Wonderful"	John Ellison	3:29
6.	"Sufferin' Mind"	Eddie "Guitar Slim" Jones	3:33
7.	"Change in the Weather"	John Fogerty	4:38
8.	"I Could Cry"	Junior Wells	5:08
9.	"Mary Ann"	Ray Charles	3:13
10.	"Trouble Man"	Marvin Gaye	4:07
11.	"Country Man"	Buddy Guy	6:16
Total length:			48:17

== Charts ==
Chart (1993)	Peak position
Dutch Albums (Album Top 100)	66
Swiss Albums (Schweizer Hitparade)	40
Swedish Albums (Sverigetopplistan)	49
Canada Top Albums/CDs (RPM)	53
UK Albums (Official Charts)	36
UK Jazz & Blues Albums (Official Charts)	21
US Billboard 200	145

== Personnel ==
Musicians

- Buddy Guy – guitar, vocals

Guest artists:

- John Mayall – piano, co-lead vocal (8)
- Bonnie Raitt – slide guitar, vocals (3)
- Paul Rodgers – co-lead vocal (5)
- Travis Tritt – co-lead vocal (7)

Other musicians:

- Tony Braunagel – percussion (tr. 3, 10)
- Tom Canning – Hammond organ (tr. 8)
- Rick Cortes – bass guitar (tr. 8)
- Marty Grebb – horn arrangements, organ (tr. 2), piano (tr. 4), sax (baritone (tr. 9), tenor (solo tr. 6)), backing vocals
- David Grissom – rhythm guitar (tr. 8)
- Richie Hayward – drums
- Darrell Leonard – trumpet
- Ian McLagan – Wurlitzer electric piano (tr. 1, 3, 11)
- Bill Payne – piano (tr. 2, 3, 5, 6, 7, 9, 10)
- John Porter – guitar (tr. 1, 2, 5, 6, 7, 10)
- Jimmy Powers – harp (tr. 4)
- Greg Rzab – bass
- Johnny Lee Schell – guitar (tr. 1, 3, 4, 6, 9, 10, 11)
- John Philip Shenale – organ, synthesizer (tr. 10)
- Joe Sublett – tenor saxophone
- Mick Weaver – organ (tr. 5, 7)
- Joe Yuele – drums (tr. 8)
- Mike Finnigan (misspelled as Mike Finnegan), Renée Geyer – backing vocals

Production

- John Porter – producer (tracks 1–7 and 9–11)
- Dave McNair – engineer, producer (track 8)
- R. S. Field – producer (track 8)
- Ron Kaplan – executive producer
- John Mayall – assistant producer
- Tony Platt – engineer
- Stephen Marcussen – mastering
