= Living Proof (Buddy Guy album) =

Studio album by Buddy Guy
- Released: 25 October 2010
- Studio: Blackbird Studio, Nashville, Tennessee, U.S.
- Genre: Chicago blues, blues rock, electric blues
- Length: 55:21
- Label: Silvertone, Jive
- Producer: Tom Hambridge

Buddy Guy chronology
Skin Deep (2008)	Living Proof (2010)	Rhythm & Blues (2013)

Singles from Living Proof
- 1. "Stay Around a Little Longer" Released: 10 September 2010

Professional ratings
Aggregate scores
Source	Rating
Metacritic	74/100
Review scores
Source	Rating
Allmusic	4/5 stars
Billboard	(favourable)
Chicago Tribune	3/4 stars
Rolling Stone	3.5/5 stars
Classic Rock	7/10 stars

Living Proof is Buddy Guy's 15th studio album. After nearly fifty years in the music business, this was Guy's highest charting album ever (until the release of Rhythm & Blues in 2013), peaking at no. 46 on the main Billboard album chart. It won the 2011 Grammy for Best Contemporary Blues Album.

The album loosely follows the progression of Guy's life. "Living Proof was designed partially as an aural autobiography from the legendary Buddy Guy, opening up with the stark summation “74 Years Young,” then running through songs that often address some aspect of a working musician's life."

== Musicians ==
- Buddy Guy – guitars, vocals
- David Grissom – guitar
- Tommy Macdonald – bass guitar (tr. 5, 6) Michael Rhodes - bass guitar
- Tom Hambridge – drums, percussion, tambourine, backing vocals
- Marty Sammon – piano (tr. 10)
- Reese Wynans – clavinet, Fender Rhodes, Hammond B3, piano, Wurlitzer - Electric Piano
- B.B. King – guitar and vocals on "Stay Around a Little Longer"
- Carlos Santana – conga and guitar on "Where the Blues Begins"

- The Memphis Horns – horns (tr. 3) are
- Wayne Jackson – trumpet
- Tom McGinley – tenor saxophone
- Jack Hale – trombone
- Bekka Bramlett, Wendy Moten – backing vocals

== Personnel ==
- Tom Hambridge - producer
- Vance Powell, John Netti, Jim Reitzel, Rob Root, Colin Linden, Michael St. Leon – engineers
- Ducky Carlisle – mixing engineer
- Nick Autry – assistant engineer, production assistant
- Mike Rooney, Joel Margolis – assistant engineers
- Gilbert Garza – guitar technician
- Ray Kennedy – mastering

== Track listing ==
No.	Title	Writer(s)	Length
1.	"74 Years Young"	Tom Hambridge, Gary Nicholson	4:34
2.	"Thank Me Someday"	Buddy Guy, Tom Hambridge	5:42
3.	"On the Road"	Richard Fleming, Tom Hambridge	4:11
4.	"Stay Around a Little Longer" (feat. B.B. King)	Tom Hambridge, Gary Nicholson	5:00
5.	"Key Don't Fit"	Tom Hambridge, Gary Nicholson	5:02
6.	"Living Proof"	Tom Hambridge	3:45
7.	"Where the Blues Begins" (feat. Carlos Santana)	Tom Hambridge, Gary Nicholson	4:37
8.	"Too Soon"	Richard Fleming, Buddy Guy, Tom Hambridge	3:26
9.	"Everybody's Got to Go"	Fleming, Buddy Guy, Tom Hambridge	3:57
10.	"Let the Door Knob Hit Ya"	Buddy Guy, Tom Hambridge	3:44
11.	"Guess What"	Richard Fleming, Tom Hambridge	5:44
12.	"Skanky"	Buddy Guy, Tom Hambridge	4:16

== Charts ==
Chart (2010)	Peak position
French Albums (SNEP)	126
Swiss Albums (Schweizer Hitparade)	75
US Billboard 200	46
US Top Blues Albums (Billboard)	1
US Top Rock Albums (Billboard)	10
US Top Tastemaker Albums (Billboard)	8
