= Eddie Boyd =

American blues musician (1914–1994)

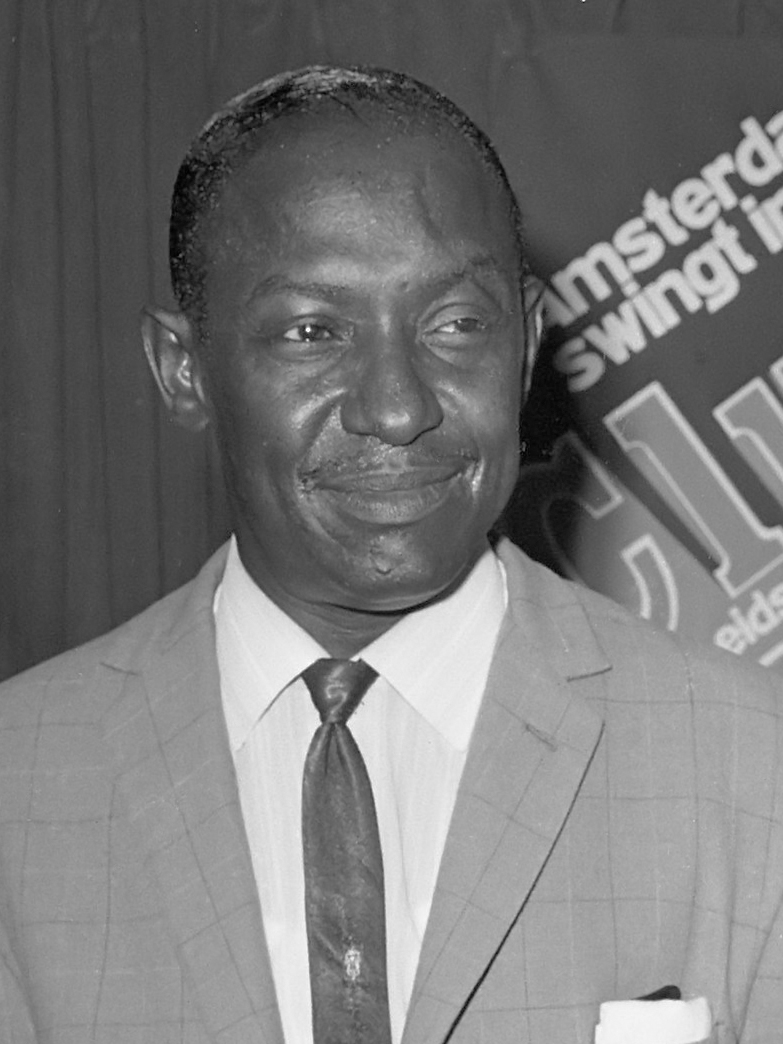
- Boyd in 1968

Background information
- Born: Edward Riley Boyd; November 25, 1914; Shelby or near Stovall, Mississippi, U.S.
- Died: July 13, 1994 (aged 79) Helsinki, Finland
- Genres: Blues
- Occupations: Singer, musician, songwriter
- Instrument: Piano
- Years active: 1930s–1990s
- Labels: JOB, Chess

Edward Riley Boyd (Note: The researchers Bob Eagle and Eric LeBlanc give his birth name as Will Joe Boyd Jr.) (November 25, 1914 – July 13, 1994) was an American blues pianist, singer and songwriter, best known for his recordings in the early 1950s, including the number one R&B chart hit "Five Long Years".

== Life and career ==
Boyd was born either on Stovall's Plantation, near Clarksdale, Mississippi, or on Frank Moore's Plantation, near Stovall, Mississippi. He learned to play the guitar and the piano. His piano playing was influenced by the styles of Roosevelt Sykes and Leroy Carr.

Boyd moved to the Beale Street district of Memphis, Tennessee, in 1936, where he played with his group, the Dixie Rhythm Boys. He then joined the Great Migration of African Americans north to the factories of Chicago in 1941. He recorded for Bluebird Records, accompanying such musicians as Sonny Boy Williamson, Jazz Gillum, Muddy Waters, and Tampa Red, before making his first recordings under his own name, in 1947.

He decided to produce his own recordings, and took two demos to Joe Brown at J.O.B. Records, who agreed to re-record the tracks. In May 1952 he recorded "Five Long Years", which became a huge hit, topping the Billboard R&B chart for seven weeks late in the year. He signed with Parrot Records, which then sold his contract to Chess Records. Boyd had two further hits for Chess in 1953, "24 Hours" and "Third Degree" (co-written by Willie Dixon), both of which reached number three on the R&B chart.

He went on to record for a series of smaller labels in the 1950s, but an automobile accident in 1957 in which he was injured put his career on hold for a while. Boyd toured Europe with Buddy Guy's band in 1965 as part of the American Folk Blues Festival. He later toured and recorded with Fleetwood Mac and John Mayall & the Bluesbreakers.

Unhappy with the racial discrimination faced in the United States, Boyd moved to Belgium, where he recorded with the Dutch band Cuby and the Blizzards. He moved again, in 1970, to Helsinki, Finland, where he continued to perform and recorded ten blues records, the first being Praise to Helsinki (1970). He married his wife, Leila, in 1977.

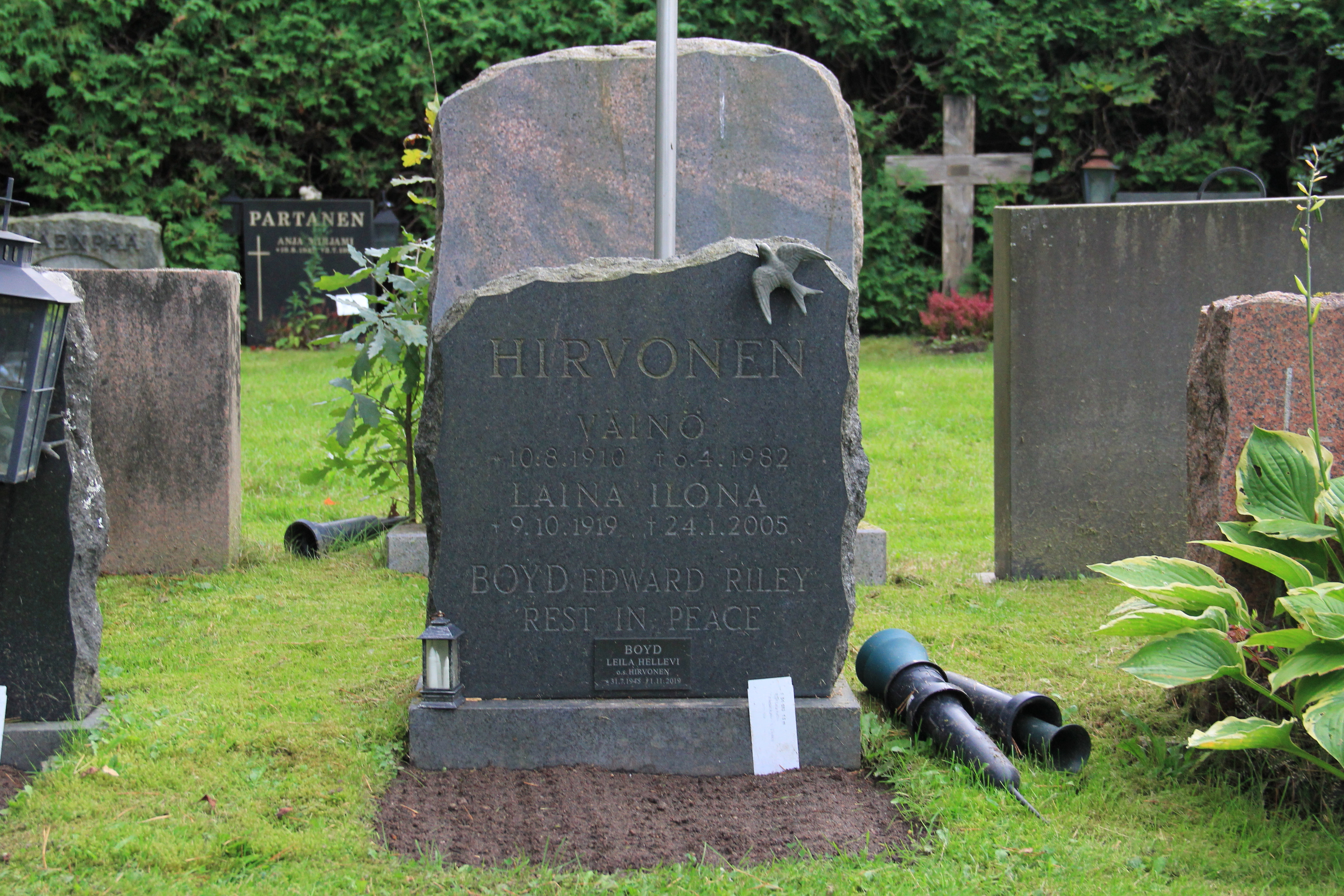
Eddie Boyd's grave at St. Lawrence Church's cemetery in Vantaa, Finland

Boyd died in 1994 at the Meilahti Hospital in Helsinki. He was buried in the St. Lawrence Church's cemetery in Vantaa. A few months later, Eric Clapton's chart-topping blues album From the Cradle, which includes interpretations of Boyd's "Five Long Years" and "Third Degree", was released.

In 2009 a plaque was unveiled on a building at Helsinginkatu 12c in Helsinki, Finland, where Boyd had lived the last third of his life.

== Discography ==
=== Studio albums ===
- Five Long Years (Fontana, 1966)
- Praise the Blues: Cuby + Blizzards & Eddie Boyd (Philips, 1967)
- Eddie Boyd and His Blues Band Featuring Peter Green (Decca, 1967)
- 7936 South Rhodes (Blue Horizon, 1968)
- Praise to Helsinki (Love Records, 1970)
- The Legacy of the Blues, vol. 10 (Sonet, 1974)
- Brotherhood (Finnish Blues Society, 1975)
- My Lady (Lobo, 1978)
- Soulful (Magic Angel, 1980)
- A Sad Day (Paris, 1980)
- Lover's Playground (Stockholm, 1984)

=== Live album ===
- Eddie Boyd Live (Storyville, 1976)

=== Compilations ===
- Vacation from the Blues (Jefferson, 1976; Mojo, 2015)
- Rattin' and Runnin' Around (Crown Prince, 1981)
- No More of This Third Degree (Teldec, 1982)
- The Best of Eddie Boyd (P-Vine, 1984)
- Third Degree (Charly R&B; Orbis, 1993)
- The Complete Recordings (1947–1950) (EPM Musique, 2001)
- Five Long Years: The Complete Recordings, Vol. 2 (1951–1953) (EPM Musique, 2004)
- Eddie Boyd in Finland (Blue North, 2005)
- The Complete Blue Horizon Sessions (Blue Horizon, 2006)
- The Blues Is Here to Stay (Jasmine, 2013)
- Blue Monday Blues 1950–1960 Sides (Soul Jam, 2015)

=== Charting singles ===
- "Five Long Years" (J.O.B., 1952)
- "24 Hours" (Chess, 1953)
- "Third Degree" (Chess, 1953)

=== Guest appearances ===
With Magic Sam

- Give Me Time (Delmark, 1991; recorded 1968)
