= Damn Right, I've Got the Blues =

Studio album by Buddy Guy
- Released: July 1, 1991
- Genre: Blues
- Length: 53:37 (1991) / 65:03 (2005)
- Label: Silvertone
- Producer: John Porter

Buddy Guy chronology
DJ Play My Blues (1982)	Damn Right, I've Got the Blues (1991)	Feels Like Rain (1993)

Professional ratings
Review scores
Source	Rating
AllMusic	4.5/5 stars
The Penguin Guide to Blues Recordings	3.5/4 stars
Rolling Stone	4/5 stars

Damn Right, I've Got the Blues is the seventh studio album by blues guitarist Buddy Guy. The album has been described by AllMusic and Rolling Stone as a commercial comeback album for Guy, after limited recording for the previous 10 years. In 2005 the album was reissued as Damn Right, I've Got the Blues Expanded Edition, featuring two bonus tracks.

== Track listing ==
No.	Title	Writer(s)	Length
1.	"Damn Right, I've Got the Blues"	Buddy Guy	4:29
2.	"Where Is the Next One Coming From?"	John Hiatt	4:35
3.	"Five Long Years"	Eddie Boyd	8:23
4.	"Mustang Sally"	Sir Mack Rice	4:43
5.	"There Is Something on Your Mind"	Big Jay McNeely	4:45
6.	"Early in the Morning"	Leo Hickman, Louis Jordan, Dallas Bartley	3:09
7.	"Too Broke to Spend the Night"	Buddy Guy	5:00
8.	"Black Night"	Jessie Mae Robinson	7:42
9.	"Let Me Love You Baby"	Willie Dixon	3:56
10.	"Rememberin' Stevie (Instrumental)"	Buddy Guy	6:55

Expanded Edition Bonus Tracks

No.	Title	Writer(s)	Length
11.	"Doin' What I Like Best (Instrumental)"	Buddy Guy	6:03
12.	"Trouble Don't Last"	Eddie "Guitar Slim" Jones	5:23

== Personnel ==
- Buddy Guy - lead vocals & lead electric guitar
- Greg Rzab - bass guitar
- Richie Hayward - drums
- Mick Weaver - Hammond B-3 organ, piano, electric piano
- Pete Wingfield - piano
- Neil Hubbard - rhythm guitar
- John Porter - bass guitar
- Tessa Niles, Katie Kissoon, Carol Kenyon - backing vocals

Guests:

- Jeff Beck - electric guitar on 4 & 6
- Eric Clapton - electric guitar on 6
- Mark Knopfler - electric guitar on 2
- The Memphis Horns:
- Wayne Jackson - trumpet
- Andrew Love - saxophone
- Jack Hale - trombone

Mastered by George Marino at Sterling Sound, NYC

== Charts ==
Chart (1991)	Peak position
Australian Albums (ARIA)	29
Dutch Albums (Album Top 100)	45
New Zealand Albums (RMNZ)	18
Swedish Albums (Sverigetopplistan)	38
Canada Top Albums/CDs (RPM)	42
UK Albums (Official Charts)	43
US Billboard 200	136

== Certifications ==
Region	Certification	Certified units/sales
United States (RIAA)	Gold	500,000^{^}
United Kingdom (BPI)	Silver	60,000^{^}
^{^} Shipments figures based on certification alone.
