= Stone Crazy! =

The Blues Giant / Stone Crazy!

Studio album by Buddy Guy
- Released: 1979
- Recorded: October 31, 1979
- Studio: Condorcet, Toulouse, France
- Genre: Electric blues, Chicago blues, blues
- Length: 42:30
- Label: Isabel / Alligator
- Producer: Didier Tricard

Buddy Guy chronology
Hold That Plane! (1972)	The Blues Giant / Stone Crazy! (1979)	Breaking Out (1980)

Alternative cover
- The 1981 Alligator release cover

Stone Crazy! (originally released as The Blues Giant) is an album by the American musician Buddy Guy. It was recorded and released in 1979.

== History ==
Only one Buddy Guy studio album had been released in the seventies (Hold That Plane! – recorded in 1969 and released in 1972), until he and his band entered Concoret Studios in Toulouse, France, for these sessions. The album was produced by Didier Tricard. To release this album, Tricard founded a new label, which Guy named "Isabel" after his mother.

== Recordings ==
On October 31, 1979, Guy and his band recorded 13 songs, for two albums – this one and the Junior Wells album Pleading the Blues (Wells only played on the tracks for his album, but the band is the same on both albums).

Guy's brother Phil played rhythm guitars, J. W. Williams played bass, Ray "Killer" Allison played drums. "Are You Losing Your Mind" is a version of Guy's earlier song "Stone Crazy", retitled due to copyright issues at the time.

== Releases ==
Originally released on the French label Isabel in 1979 as The Blues Giant, in France and the U.K., but with alternate covers. It was first released in the U.S. in 1981 by Alligator Records (retitled Stone Crazy!). It was released in Brazil in 1988 (with an alternate cover). It was released on CD in 1990 (in the U.S. by Alligator as Stone Crazy!), in the UK by Isabel (as The Blues Giant). It was released on CD in France by Isabel in 2002 as Stone Crazy!, but with an alternate cover to the U.S. release.

== Critical reception ==
Professional ratings
Review scores
Source	Rating
AllMusic	3.5/5 stars
Robert Christgau	B+
MusicHound Blues: The Essential Album Guide	4.5/5 stars
The Penguin Guide to Blues Recordings	3.5/4 stars
The Rolling Stone Album Guide	3.5/5 stars

Robert Christgau considered the album to be "wilder and more jagged" than A Man and the Blues.

The Calgary Herald called the album "arguably the finest example of blues guitar this decade." AllMusic wrote that "Guy mostly indulges his histrionic side throughout this high-energy set." The Rolling Stone Album Guide deemed the album "righteously wailin'."

== Track listing ==
All tracks written by Buddy Guy, except "Outskirts of Town" by Casey Bill Weldon and Andy Razaf.

1. "I Smell a Rat" – 9:31
2. "Are You Losing Your Mind" – 6:33
3. "You've Been Gone Too Long" – 5:38
4. "She's Out There Somewhere" – 4:26
5. "Outskirts of Town" – 8:13
6. "When I Left Home" – 8:20

== Personnel ==
- Buddy Guy – lead guitar, vocals
- Phil Guy – rhythm guitar
- J.W. Williams – bass
- Ray Allison – drums
