= Chromatic harmonica =

Type of harmonica

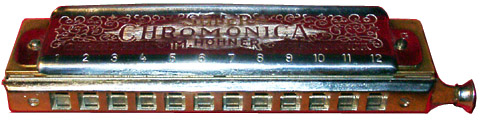
Hohner Super-Chromonica harmonica, a typical 12-hole chromatic

The chromatic harmonica is a type of harmonica that uses a button-activated sliding bar to redirect air from the hole in the mouthpiece to the selected reed-plate desired. When the button is not pressed, a diatonic major scale of the key of the harmonica is available, while pressing the button accesses the same scale a semitone higher in each hole. Thus, the instrument is capable of playing the 12 notes of the Western chromatic scale. The chromatic harmonica can thus be contrasted with a standard harmonica, which can play only the notes in a given musical key.

Famously accomplished chromatic harmonica players include classical players Larry Adler, Tommy Reilly, Antonio Serrano, Sigmund Groven, and Willi Burger; jazz players Toots Thielemans, Mauricio Einhorn, Mathias Heise, Gregoire Maret, Yvonnick Prene, Hendrik Meurkens, and William Galison; and popular musicians Norton Buffalo and Stevie Wonder.

Chromatic harmonicas are usually 12, 14 or 16 holes long. The 12-hole chromatic is available in 12 keys, but because the entire chromatic scale is available by definition, most professionals stick with the key of C—which is perhaps easier to remember, since slide in will automatically be the sharps of the associated note.

Chromatic harmonicas are traditionally tuned to solo tuning, which has a similar layout to the diatonic's Richter tuning except that it eliminates the G on the draw and doubles the Cs that are not on the ends of the instrument. In the standard 12-hole chromatic in C the lowest note is middle C, while 16-hole variants start one octave lower. For the 16-hole variant, the layout is usually as follows. Note that the "D" in the last key-in draw note is common, though by no means present in all chromatic harmonicas.

blow	C	E	G	C	C	E	G	C	C	E	G	C	C	E	G	C	key out
draw	D	F	A	B	D	F	A	B	D	F	A	B	D	F	A	B	key out
	1 1′	2 2′	3 3′	4 4′	5 1	6 2	7 3	8 4	9 5	10 6	11 7	12 8	13 9	14 10	15 11	16 12	
blow	C♯	F	G♯	C♯	C♯	F	G♯	C♯	C♯	F	G♯	C♯	C♯	F	G♯	C♯	key in
draw	D♯	F♯	A♯	C	D♯	F♯	A♯	C	D♯	F♯	A♯	C	D♯	F♯	A♯	D	key in

== Advantages ==
Because it is a fully chromatic instrument, the chromatic harmonica is the instrument of choice in jazz and classical music. The "solo tuning" layout repeats itself at each octave, which simplifies playing in different octaves and keys in contrast to the Richter tuning system. Also, due to the windsavers on the low and mid-range holes, it can bend notes on both blow and draw notes, giving additional tonality if needed. In traditional harmonica bands, the chromatic harmonica plays the lead part.

Stock chromatics are well suited for players who play chromatics in third position traditional Chicago Blues, and benefit from having a selection of keys.

== Disadvantages ==
While the chromatic harmonica is capable of playing in all keys, it does have limitations. For example, while chromatic harmonicas can "bend" notes down in pitch, as a single-reed bend it sounds quite different from the typical dual-reed bend of a blues harp, and can only bend downward by a semi-tone. Furthermore, unless the windsavers are removed, chromatic harmonicas cannot "overblow" except on the upper four holes. However, dual-reed bends and overblows are possible on slideless chromatic harmonicas, as the Tombo S-50.

Perhaps more importantly, the number of chords, double-stops, and legato phrasings available is limited, unless the harmonica is retuned from standard tuning; the lack of a G on the draw makes it impossible to play the G chords available on a Richter-tuned device. Thus, while a chromatic harmonica is well-suited for playing lead or melody, diatonic harmonicas have a greater advantage when playing harmony or accompaniment.

As the chromatic harmonica is designed to play melodies in any key, many 16-hole and special version chromatic are only made in the key of C. Because of this, there are many approaches to get over the limits of the chromatic harmonica: the first and the most common approach, encouraged mainly by classical music players (such as Franz Chmel), is that a good harmonica player should try his or her best to use the chromatic in the key of C; some even discourage switching to other keys. An alternative approach is to have several keys and play them as if playing key of F on a key of C. Although it still requires being able to play over complex changes, modulating and so forth, it enables the player to focus more on the music. Another approach is using altered tunings such as Diminished, which requires learning to play three (or four) patterns and then be able to play in all keys.

Chromatic harmonicas tend to be significantly more expensive than their diatonic counterparts—with a typical chromatic harmonica selling at a price that is up to ten times higher than a simple diatonic harmonica. Chromatic harmonicas produced by reputable companies (such as Hohner, Seydel, and Suzuki) range between 70 and 700 US dollars.

== Slider design ==
Chromatic harmonicas are often described as either "straight tuned" or "cross tuned". This refers to the way the slider is shaped to isolate the reed set being played at a given position (button "in" or button "out"). Traditionally the chromatic was "straight tuned" and the slider selected either the upper reed-plate (button out) or the lower reed-plate (button in). In the later half of the 20th century a new system came into use in which the slider played the upper and lower reed-plates at the same time, staggered by which hole (thus with the button out the player might play the upper reed-plate in hole 1, the lower reed-plate in hole 2, and then the upper again in hole 3 and so forth; pressing the button reversed this). This allows for a larger hole in the slider, and thus presumably more air gets through, allowing a louder volume. The two methods co-exist with some companies and players preferring one style and others another.

There are at least two other types of slider design as well. The first one has holes side by side with each other in the slider, thus opening only the left side of the chamber or the right side depending on button position. The Renaissance chromatic uses this design, which is claimed to mix the larger hole of a cross-tuned design with an even shorter movement than in straight tuned sliders. The simple way of doing this is to construct the harmonica more like a traditional Richter diatonic whereas the standard chromatic design shares more in common with the Knittlinger octave harmonicas. Note, however, the Renaissance uses a complex comb design to achieve their slider design. The second type of alternative design is found mostly in East Asia and is based more along the traditional Weiner tremolo construction. Here each reed is isolated in its own cell within the comb and the slider selects a single reed at a time rather than a cell containing both blow and draw reeds. The Tombo Ultimo is an example of this type of chromatic.

Finally, there are also several types of non-slide chromatic instruments available, particularly in Asia, such as the horn harmonica, as well as Tombo's S-50, Tombo's Chromatic Violin Range, and others. Tombo Chromatic Violin Range (three and a half octaves), as well as S-50 (three octaves) use the tremolo scale tuning system (but with only one-reed): in essence it is a C♯ tremolo harmonica sitting on top of a C tremolo harmonica, with blow and draw reeds each sitting in a single cell. The player switches between a top row tuned to C♯ and a bottom tuned to C by changing the angle of the harmonica.

== Alternative tunings ==
Like diatonic harmonicas, chromatics are available in numerous tunings. However, there are three more popular versions: one is Irish tuning, whereby notes are flattened (instead of sharpened) when the slide is in. This makes playing Irish music and, to a certain extent, blues, easier, since Irish music is commonly played in either the key of D or key of G. The use of C, with no sharps or flats, and B, with all flats, allows common Irish modes to be played while the downward-tuning slide allows ornamentation in keeping with the Irish tradition. Irish tuning can be achieved easily by reversing the slide (flipping the slide upside down) of a chromatic in the key of B major; alternatively, one can use the B major as is, but with slide-in as the home position.

blow	C	E	G	C	C	E	G	C	C	E	G	C	C	E	G	C	key out
draw	D	F	A	B	D	F	A	B	D	F	A	B	D	F	A	B	key out
	1′	2′	3′	4′	1	2	3	4	5	6	7	8	9	10	11	12	
blow	B	E♭	G♭	B	B	E♭	G♭	B	B	E♭	G♭	B	B	E♭	G♭	B	key in
draw	D♭	E	A♭	B♭	D♭	E	A♭	B♭	D♭	E	A♭	B♭	D♭	E	A♭	B♭	key in

Another variant is bebop tuning, which is done by tuning the redundant C/C♯ in holes 4′, 4, 8, and 12 blow into a B♭/B pair. This allows playing chords in the key of F, as well as playing a C^{7} chord.

blow	C	E	G	B♭	C	E	G	B♭	C	E	G	B♭	C	E	G	B♭	key out
draw	D	F	A	B	D	F	A	B	D	F	A	B	D	F	A	B	key out
	1′	2′	3′	4′	1	2	3	4	5	6	7	8	9	10	11	12	
blow	C♯	F	G♯	B	C♯	F	G♯	B	C♯	F	G♯	B	C♯	F	G♯	B	key in
draw	D♯	F♯	A♯	C	D♯	F♯	A♯	C	D♯	F♯	A♯	C	D♯	F♯	A♯	C	key in

Another popular version of alternative tuning is classical tuning, which is done by switching between the blow and draw of the fourth hole of each octave:

blow	C	E	G	B	C	E	G	B	C	E	G	B	C	E	G	B	key out
draw	D	F	A	C	D	F	A	C	D	F	A	C	D	F	A	C	key out
	1′	2′	3′	4′	1	2	3	4	5	6	7	8	9	10	11	12	
blow	C♯	F	G♯	C	C♯	F	G♯	C	C♯	F	G♯	C	C♯	F	G♯	C	key in
draw	D♯	F♯	A♯	C♯	D♯	F♯	A♯	C♯	D♯	F♯	A♯	C♯	D♯	F♯	A♯	C♯	key in

This easily allows Imaj^{7} and IIm^{7} chords, as well as many others, to be played–a benefit for various musical styles.

Another tuning is minor tuning for natural and harmonic minor Im^{7} and IIdim^{7} normal position.

blow	C	E♭	G	B♭	C	E♭	G	B♭	C	E♭	G	B♭	C	E♭	G	B♭	key out
draw	D	F	A♭	B	D	F	A♭	B	D	F	A♭	B	D	F	A♭	B	key out
	1′	2′	3′	4′	1	2	3	4	5	6	7	8	9	10	11	12	
blow	C♯	E	G♯	B	C♯	E	G♯	B	C♯	E	G♯	B	C♯	E	G♯	B	key in
draw	D♯	F♯	A	C	D♯	F♯	A	C	D♯	F♯	A	C	D♯	F♯	A	C	key in
