= Live Recording at Yuhbin-Chokin Hall =

Live album by Buddy Guy and Junior Wells
- Released: 1975
- Recorded: March 9–11, 1975
- Venue: Yuhbin-Chokin Hall, Hiroshima, Japan
- Genre: Blues
- Length: 70:19 (CD)
- Label: Bourbon Records
- Producer: Takao Nauri

Recording Live at Yuhbin-Chokin Hall is a double live album by blues musicians Buddy Guy and Junior Wells, recorded live in Japan in March 1975 and released only in Japan in that same year.

== Background and recording ==
The Buddy Guy/Junior Wells Blues Band took a little tour in Japan in March 1975. They recorded three shows at Yuhbin-Chokin Hall in Hiroshima on March 9–11. A double live album was released in 1975, it was re-released on a single CD in 1990, both of them only in Japan. Unfortunately the CD excludes five songs.

== Track listing ==
=== LP ===
Side one

1. "Let Me Love You Baby"
2. "How Blue Can You Get"
3. "High-Heel Sneakers"
4. "One Room Country Shack"

Side two

1. "First Time I Met The Blues"
2. "Stone Crazy"
3. "Fever/Work Song"
4. "Come On Home To Me Baby"
5. "Rock Me Baby"

Side three

1. "Little By Little"
2. "Stop Breakin' Down"
3. "Don't Go No Further"
4. "Look Over Yonder's Wall"
5. "Snatch It Back And Hold It"

Side four

1. "Help Me Darling"
2. "Hoochie Coohie Man"
3. "Someday Baby"
4. "Waterman Blues"
5. "Messin' With The Kid"

=== CD ===
1. "Let Me Love You Baby" - 4:15
2. "How Blue Can You Get" - 5:25
3. "High-Heel Sneakers" - 5:15
4. "First Time I Met The Blues" - 7:00
5. "Stone Crazy" - 5:15
6. "Fever/Work Song" - 3:30
7. "Come On Home To Me Baby" - 3:55
8. "Little By Little" - 4:50
9. "Don't Go No Further" - 5:05
10. "Snatch It Back And Hold It" - 4:55
11. "Help Me Darling" - 4:40
12. "Hoochie Coohie Man/Someday Baby" - 7:55
13. "Waterman Blues" - 5:20

Note

- Track lengths are without applause.

== Personnel ==
- Buddy Guy – Guitars, Vocals (LP A/B-sides) (CD tracks 1–6)
- Junior Wells – Harmonica, Vocals (LP C/D-sides) (CD tracks 8–12)
- Phil Guy – Guitars, Vocals on "Rock Me Baby" (only on LP)
- A.C. Reed – Tenor Saxophone, Vocals on "Come on Home to Me" (CD track 7)
- Earnest Johnson – Bass
- Roosevelt Shaw – Drums
