= Early in the Morning (Sonny Boy Williamson I song) =

1937 single by Sonny Boy Williamson I

Single by Sonny Boy Williamson I
- Released: 1937
- Recorded: Chicago, November 11, 1937
- Genre: Blues
- Length: 2:47
- Label: Bluebird
- Songwriter(s): Unknown

"Early in the Morning" (sometimes called "'Bout the Break of Day") is a blues song that was recorded by Sonny Boy Williamson I in 1937. Identified as one of his most successful and influential tunes, it was inspired by earlier blues songs. "Early in the Morning" has been recorded by various musicians, including Junior Wells, who made it part of his repertoire.

== Origins ==
"Early in the Morning" is based on a 1929 recording by pianist Charlie Spand, titled "Soon This Morning". It includes some similar lyrics:

It's early in the mornin' 'bout the break of day
My head on the pillow where my mama used to lay

Spand subsequently recorded more versions of "Soon This Morning". Several other bluesmen also recorded renditions of the song, often varying the lyrics.

Ten months prior to Spand's recording, Leroy Carr recorded "Truthful Blues". Although he performs the song at a slower tempo and uses different lyrics, it has elements similar to "Soon This Morning". Also singing in a piano blues style, Carr's opens with "And I woke up this mornin' just about the break of day". Both lyrical variations have been used frequently in subsequent recordings, but it is unknown if Carr's song influenced Spand's.

== Sonny Boy Williamson I version ==
On November 11, 1937, John Lee "Sonny Boy" Williamson recorded "Early in the Morning" for Bluebird Records. The song is a medium-tempo twelve-bar blues that features Williamson's vocal and harmonica accompanied by Robert Lee McCoy (later known as Robert Nighthawk) and Henry Townsend on guitars. He incorporated his signature "call-and-response style of alternating vocal passages with pungent harmonica blasts" that became a fundamental of blues harmonica. Williamson's chorus uses lyrics similar to the earlier songs:

You tell me 'Come early in the mornin', baby 'bout the break of day'
Now ya oughta see me grab the pillow where my baby used to lay

Although described as one of Williamson's "hits" and "extremely successful as well as influential", it (and the other early versions of the song) was released before blues songs were tracked by record industry trade magazines such as Billboard. He re-recorded the song several times, but none appeared on the R&B charts. The tune appears on several compilations of Williamson's recordings, such as Sugar Mama (1995) with the original 1937 version and Stop Breaking Down (2000) with the 1945 remake.

== Junior Wells versions ==
Chicago blues harmonica player Junior Wells recorded several versions of "Early in the Morning" during his career. He first recorded it in 1954 for States Records, while he claimed he was AWOL from the U.S. Army. Titled "'Bout the Break of Day", Wells added several verses which have been used in subsequent versions of the song by other artists. Backing Wells on vocal and harmonica are Muddy Waters and Louis Myers on guitars, Otis Spann on piano, Willie Dixon on bass, and Fred Below on drums. In 1965, he recorded two versions of the song with Buddy Guy – a live recording at Pepper's Lounge in Chicago, which was released on It's My Life, Baby! and a studio recording for the influential Hoodoo Man Blues. As with Williamson's versions, Wells' rendition has been identified as one of his "hits", but it did not appear on the record charts.
