= Breaking Out (album) =

- Original vinyl cover

Studio album by Buddy Guy
- Released: December 1980
- Recorded: September 1980
- Studio: Sound Station, Chicago
- Genre: Blues, Chicago Blues
- Length: 38:02 (original release), 46:54 (first CD release), 52:38 (1996 reissue), 74:10 (2008 reissue)
- Label: JSP
- Producer: Buddy Guy, John Stedman

Buddy Guy chronology
The Blues Giant (1979)	Breaking Out (1980)	DJ Play My Blues (1982)

Professional ratings
Review scores
Source	Rating
AllMusic	3/5 stars
The Penguin Guide to Blues Recordings	3/4 stars

Breaking Out is the fifth studio album by Buddy Guy. It was released in 1980 on JSP Records.

== Recordings ==
The original album tracks were recorded at Sound Station, Chicago, IL, in September 1980 with session musicians. They recorded two more tracks on these sessions, "Feeling Sexy" and "Funk Is the Skunk". These were originally released on JSP LP Buddy & Philip Guy in 1981.

== CD releases ==
It was released on CD first on JSP at the end of the 80s with a bonus track ("Feeling Sexy") and an alternate cover. The 1996 CD release includes two bonus tracks (which were recorded on another session at Soto Sound Studios in 1981). The 2008 CD release includes three bonus tracks from the 1981 Soto Sound sessions. These five tracks were previously released on Phil Guy's albums, The Red Hot Blues of Phil Guy (1982) and Bad Luck Boy (1983). All of the CD releases have alternate covers.

== Original track listing ==
1. "I Didn't Know My Mother Had a Son Like Me" - 5:00
2. "Have You Ever Been Lonesome" - 6:22
3. "She Winked at Me" - 4:55
4. "Boogie Family Style" - 4:01
5. "Break Out All Over You" - 4:10
6. "You Called Me in My Dream" - 4:06
7. "Me and My Guitar" (Freddie King) - 4:49
8. "You Can Make It If You Try" (Ted Jarrett) - 4:39

== First CD release bonus track ==
1. "Feeling Sexy" - 8:52

== 1996 reissue track listing ==
1. "Have You Ever Been Lonesome" - 6:22
2. "You Can Make It If You Try" - 4:39
3. "Break Out All over You (Poison Ivy)" - 4:10
4. "She Winked at Me" - 4:55
5. "I Didn't Know My Mother Had a Son Like Me" - 5:00
6. "Boogie Family Style" - 4:01
7. "You Called Me in My Dream" - 4:06
8. "Me and My Guitar" - 4:49
9. "Ice Around My Heart" - 8:53
10. "Texas Flood" - 5:43

== 2008 reissue track listing ==
1. "Have You Ever Been Lonesome" - 6:25
2. "You Can Make It If You Try" - 4:42
3. "Break Out All over You (Poison Ivy)" - 4:13
4. "She Winked at Me" - 5:08
5. "I Didn't Know My Mother Had a Son Like Me" - 5:02
6. "Boogie Family Style" - 4:03
7. "You Called Me in My Dream" - 4:01
8. "Me and My Guitar" - 5:04
9. "Breaking Out on Top" - 7:25
10. "Skin & Bones / Money" - 8:24
11. "Love Is Like Quicksand" - 5:06
12. "Ice Around My Heart" - 8:53
13. "Texas Flood" - 5:44

== Personnel ==
Original album + "Feeling Sexy":

- Buddy Guy - guitar, vocals all except "Feeling Sexy"
- Phil Guy - guitar, vocals on "Feeling Sexy"
- William McDonald - guitar
- Nick Charles - bass
- Jene Pickett - keyboards
- Merle Perkins - drums

1998 & 2006 Reissue bonus tracks:

- Phil Guy - guitar, vocals
- Buddy Guy - guitar
- Doug Williams - guitar
- Eddie "Professor" Lusk - keyboards
- Maurice John Vaughn - saxophone
- J. W. Williams - bass
- Ray Allison - drums
