= Bad Luck Boy =

Studio album by Phil Guy
- Released: 1983
- Recorded: March 1982
- Studio: Soto Sound Studio, Palatine, Illinois
- Genre: Blues
- Length: 38:02
- Label: JSP
- Producer: Phil Guy

Phil Guy chronology
The Red Hot Blues of Phil Guy (1982)	Bad Luck Boy (1983)	It's a Real Mutha Fucka (1985)

Bad Luck Boy is the second album by blues musician Phil Guy, recorded in March 1982 and released on JSP Records in 1983.

== Background and recordings ==
"Bad Luck Boy" was recorded at the same session, like Phil Guy's previous album The Red Hot Blues of Phil Guy, but it was released a year later. The album's last two tracks was recorded in December 1981, also in the Soto Sound Studio, when they recorded DJ Play My Blues for Buddy Guy.

== Release ==
“Bad Luck Boy” released only on vinyl in 1983. Tracks 1–4 were released on Phil Guy's All Star Chicago Blues Session compilation CD in 1994 by JSP, while tracks 5–6 were released on Buddy Guy's DJ Play My Blues CD.

== Track listing ==
All tracks are written by Phil Guy & Eddie Lusk; except where noted.

Side one
No.	Title	Writer(s)	Length
1.	"Bad Luck Boy"		9:04
2.	"Money"	Berry Gordy, Janie Bradford	4:03
3.	"Breaking Out On Top"		7:18

Side two
No.	Title	Writer(s)	Length
4.	"Cold Feeling"		8:50
5.	"Mellow Down"	Willie Dixon	5:50
6.	"Comin' On"	Phil Guy, Buddy Guy	2:57

Note

- “Bad Luck Boy” is a rework of "Born Under a Bad Sign", written by Booker T. Jones and William Bell. Although "Cold Feeling" credited to Phil Guy and Eddie Lusk, originally written by Jesse Mae Robinson.

== Personnel ==
- Phil Guy – guitar, vocals
- Buddy Guy – guitar
- Doug Williams – guitar
- Professor Eddie Lusk – keyboards (tracks 1–4)
- J. W. Williams – bass (tracks 1–4)
- Mike Morrison – bass (tracks 5–6)
- Ray Allison – drums
- Maurice John Vaughn – saxophone (tracks 1–4)
- Larry Cox – harmonica (credited, but he doesn't play on these tracks)
