= The Red Hot Blues of Phil Guy =

Studio album by Phil Guy
- Released: 1982
- Recorded: March 1982
- Studio: Soto Sound Studio, Chicago
- Genre: Blues
- Length: 36:06
- Label: JSP
- Producer: Phil Guy

Phil Guy chronology
The Red Hot Blues of Phil Guy (1982)	Bad Luck Boy (1983)

The Red Hot Blues of Phil Guy is the first album by blues musician Phil Guy, recorded in March 1982 and released on JSP Records in that same year.

== Background and recordings ==
Three months after they recorded DJ Play My Blues album for Buddy Guy, they entered the Soto Sound Studio in Chicago again to record a new session, but this time led by Phil Guy. They recorded a bunch of songs, which released on two different albums. The first one was released in 1982, and the next a year later, both on JSP. There was some changes in the line-up, Professor Eddie Lusk connected on keyboards, J.W. Williams returned on the bass, Maurice John Vaughn played some saxes.

== Releases ==
The “Red Hot Blues of Phil Guy” released only on vinyl in 1982, but most of the tracks released on Phil Guy’s All Star Chicago Blues Session compilation CD in 1994 by JSP.

== Track listing ==
Side one
No.	Title	Length
1.	"Love Is Like Quicksand"	5:04
2.	"Blues With a Feeling"	6:21
3.	"Skin & Bones"	4:19
4.	"Winehead"	3:50

Side two
No.	Title	Length
5.	"Texas Flood"	5:46
6.	"Red Dress"	4:11
7.	"Garbage Man Blues"	6:35

Note

- "Red Dress" is a rework of the blues standard "Hi-Heel Sneakers", written by Tommy Tucker.

== Personnel ==
- Phil Guy – guitar, vocals
- Buddy Guy – guitar
- Doug Williams – guitar
- Professor Eddie Lusk – keyboards
- J. W. Williams – bass
- Ray Allison – drums
- Maurice John Vaughn - saxophone (tracks 2, 3, 5)
- Larry Cox - harmonica (tracks 2, 6)
