= Hold That Plane! =

Studio album by Buddy Guy
- Released: 1972
- Recorded: November 25–26, 1969
- Studios: Vanguard, 71 West 23rd Street, New York City
- Genre: Blues
- Length: 39:06
- Label: Vanguard
- Producers: Michael Cuscuna, Buddy Guy

Buddy Guy chronology
A Man and the Blues (1968)	Hold That Plane! (1972)	The Blues Giant (1979)

Professional ratings
Review scores
Source	Rating
AllMusic	2/5 stars
The Penguin Guide to Blues Recordings	2.5/4 stars

Hold That Plane! is the third studio album by blues guitarist Buddy Guy. It was recorded in November 1969, but not released by Vanguard Records until 1972.

== History ==
Buddy Guy had no luck with the record companies. Although he had recorded for Chess since 1958 (mostly as a sideman), his first full-length album wasn't released until ten years later (consisting of material recorded between 1965 and 1967). After leaving Chess, Buddy signed with Vanguard Records who released his second LP in 1968. Though this was a good period for Buddy (he was under new management who organized a lot of live work- especially for big music festivals), and he was popular with black and white audiences as a result, his recording career was still full of unfulfilled promise. A new band (including his brother Phil Guy on rhythm guitar) recorded these tracks in November 1969, but they inexplicably weren't released until almost three years later in 1972. Including two Guy originals (one written with his brother Phil), fiery covers of the Muddy Waters classic "I'm Ready" and the Willie Cobbs hit "You Don't Love Me" (regularly covered by the Allman Brothers Band at this time). The album opens with a funky adaptation of Herbie Hancock's modern jazz classic "Watermelon Man".

== Track listing ==
No.	Title	Writer(s)	Length
1.	"Watermelon Man"	Herbie Hancock	5:14
2.	"Hold That Plane"	Buddy Guy	4:37
3.	"I'm Ready"	Willie Dixon	5:01
4.	"My Time After Awhile"	Robert Geddins	4:14
5.	"You Don't Love Me"	Ellas McDaniel	5:30
6.	"Come See About Me"	Buddy Guy, Philip Guy	8:33
7.	"Hello San Francisco"	Robert Geddins	5:20

== Personnel ==
- Buddy Guy – guitar, vocals
- Phil Guy – guitar
- A.C. Reed – tenor saxophone
- Gary Bartz – alto saxophone
- Junior Mance – piano
- Earnest Johnson – bass
- Jesse Lewis – drums

Additional musicians

- Bill Folwell – bass on "Watermelon Man"
- Barry Altschul – drums on "Watermelon Man"
- Mark T. Jordan – piano on "Come See About Me"
- Freebo – bass on "Come See About Me"
- David "Rip" Stock – drums on "Come See About Me"

Technical

- Jules Halfant - album design
- Joel Brodsky - cover photography
