= Solo tuning =

Tuning system

Solo tuning is a system of choosing the reeds for a diatonic wind instrument (such as a harmonica or accordion) to fit a pattern where blow notes repeat a sequence of

C E G C

(perhaps shifted to begin with E or with G) and draw notes follow a repeating sequence of

D F A B

(perhaps correspondingly shifted). Or, alternately, these blow notes and draw notes, raised by a semitone, to

C♯ F G♯ C♯

and to

D♯ F♯ A♯ C

Traditionally, this tuning is used with chromatic harmonicas, as opposed to the more common and popular diatonic harmonicas, which use Richter tuning.

The first diagram below shows that solo tuning includes all the major scale notes (C D E F G A B C) for all three octaves, while Richter tuning has some missing notes such as A and F on the lowest octave. In order to include the four notes D F A B on the draw holes, solo tuning uses four holes for each octave, resulting in pairs adjacent of C notes on the blow holes, unlike Richter tuning.

For example:

	1	2	3	4	5	6	7	8	9	10	11	12
blow	C	E	G	C	C	E	G	C	C	E	G	C
draw	D	F	A	B	D	F	A	B	D	F	A	B

and

	1	2	3	4	5	6	7	8	9	10	11	12
blow	C♯	F	G♯	C♯	C♯	F	G♯	C♯	C♯	F	G♯	C♯
draw	D♯	F♯	A♯	C	D♯	F♯	A♯	C	D♯	F♯	A♯	C

== See also ==
- Augmented tuning
- Country tuning
- Diminished tuning
- Harmonic minor tuning
- Major seventh tuning
- Melody Maker tuning
- Natural minor tuning
- Paddy Richter tuning
- Richter tuning
