= Diminished tuning =

Diminished tuning is a system of choosing the reeds for a diatonic wind instrument (such as a harmonica or accordion) in which the blow notes repeat a sequence of

C E♭ F♯ A

and draw notes follow a repeating sequence of

D F G♯ B

(perhaps shifted to begin with E♭ and F, with F♯ and G♯, or with A and B).

For example:

hole	1	2	3	4	5	6	7	8	9	10	11	12
blow note	C	E♭	F♯	A	C	E♭	F♯	A	C	E♭	F♯	A
draw note	D	F	G♯	B	D	F	G♯	B	D	F	G♯	B

== See also ==
- Augmented tuning
- Country tuning
- Harmonic minor tuning
- Major seventh tuning
- Melody Maker tuning
- Natural minor tuning
- Paddy Richter tuning
- Richter tuning
- Solo tuning
