= Augmented tuning =

Tuning system for musical instruments

An augmented tuning is a musical tuning system for musical instruments that is associated with augmented triads, that is a root note, a major third, and an augmented fifth. The augmented fifth is constructed by stacking the major third with another major third. Consequently, all of the intervals are major thirds.

Augmented tunings are used for stringed instruments, especially guitars, and for wind instruments. For guitars, augmented tunings are called major thirds tunings.

== Instruments ==
=== Guitar ===
Major-thirds (M3) tunings are unconventional open tunings, in which the open strings form an augmented triad; in M3 tunings, the augmented fifth replaces the perfect fifth of the major triad of conventional open-tunings. Consequently M3 tunings are also called (open) augmented-fifth tunings (in French "La guitare #5, majeure quinte augmentée"). Unfortunately, the open augmented-chord sounds dissonant to audiences who are accustomed to standard tuning.

=== Wind ===
For a diatonic wind instrument (such as a harmonica or accordion), the blow notes repeat a sequence of

C E G♯

(perhaps shifted to begin with E♭ or with G) and draw notes follow a repeating sequence of

E♭ G B

though perhaps with a different initial sequence.

For example:

hole	1	2	3	4	5	6	7	8	9	10	11	12
blow note	C	E	G♯	C	E	G♯	C	E	G♯	C	E	G♯
draw note	E♭	G	B	E♭	G	B	E♭	G	B	E♭	G	B

== See also ==
- Diminished tuning
- Richter tuning
- Solo tuning
