= Pleading the Blues =

Studio album by Junior Wells
- Released: 1979
- Recorded: October 31, 1979
- Studios: Condorcet, Toulouse, France
- Genres: Blues, Chicago blues
- Length: 38:53 (LP); 47:49 (CD)
- Labels: Isabel; Evidence
- Producer: Didier Tricard

Junior Wells chronology
Play the Blues (1972)	Pleading the Blues (1979)	Going Back (1981)

Alternative cover
- The 1993 CD release cover

Professional ratings
Review scores
Source	Rating
AllMusic	3/5 stars
MusicHound Blues: The Essential Album Guide	3/5 stars
The Penguin Guide to Blues Recordings	3.5/4 stars

Pleading the Blues is an album by Chicago blues harp player Junior Wells.

== Background and recording ==
The first collaboration of Junior Wells and his long-time friend Buddy Guy dated back to the early 1960s. Their first album, Hoodoo Man Blues, was recorded in 1965. They entered into the Condorcet Studios in Toulouse, France on October 31, 1979, when Guy recorded an album with the French producer, Didier Tricard. To release those recordings, Tricard founded a new label, which was named Isabel by Buddy Guy, in honor of his mother. They recorded 13 songs for two different albums in the same day. One of them was released as a Buddy Guy album titled The Blues Giant, while the other one was released as a Junior Wells album, Pleading the Blues.

Wells played only on his album, but the other musicians are the same on both albums. Guy and his younger brother Phil played guitars, J. W. Williams played bass, and Ray "Killer" Allison drums. All lead guitars played by Buddy Guy, except "Cut Out the Lights" and the first lead of "I Smell Something" by Phil Guy.

== Releases ==
It was originally released on the French label Isabel in 1979, titled Pleading the Blues. It was first released on CD by Isabel in 1990, including a bonus track. It was first released in the U.S. in 1993, on CD by Evidence, but with alternate track order.

== Track listing ==
All tracks written by Junior Wells, except where noted

1. "Pleading the Blues" – 7:36
2. "It Hurts Me Too" (Hudson Whittaker a.k.a. Tampa Red) – 4:20
3. "Cut Out the Lights" – 7:40
4. "Just for My Baby" – 4:06
5. "Quit Teasing My Baby" – 4:24
6. "I'll Take Care of You" (Brook Benton) – 6:45
7. "Take Your Time Baby" – 4:02

CD bonus track

1. "I Smell Something" – 8:56

== Personnel ==
- Junior Wells – harmonica, vocals
- Buddy Guy – guitars
- Phil Guy – guitars
- J.W. Williams – bass
- Ray Allison – drums
