= Everybody's Gettin' Some =

Studio album by Junior Wells
- Released: 1995
- Genre: Blues, R&B
- Length: 56:33
- Label: Telarc

Junior Wells chronology
Messin' with the Kid 1957–63 (1995)	Everybody's Gettin' Some (1995)	Come On in This House (1996)

Everybody's Gettin' Some is an album by the American musician Junior Wells, released in 1995. It was his second album for Telarc Records. Wells supported the album with a North American tour.

== Production ==
The album was recorded in Maurice, Louisiana. "Don't You Lie to Me" was written by Tampa Red; "Sweet Sixteen" was written by Al Green. "Shaky Ground" is a cover of the Temptations song; "Use Me" is a cover of the Bill Withers song. Willie Weeks played bass on the album. The Legendary White Trash Horns played on "I Can't Stand No Signifyin'". Carlos Santana guested on "Get Down". Bonnie Raitt also appeared on Everybody's Gettin' Some; Wells had contributed to her debut album.

== Critical reception ==
Professional ratings
Review scores
Source	Rating
AllMusic	1.5/5 stars
The Indianapolis Star	2.5/4 stars
MusicHound Blues: The Essential Album Guide	3/5 stars
The Penguin Guide to Blues Recordings	2/4 stars

Stereo Review noted the "interesting guests" and "fabulous sound." The Indianapolis Star wrote that "the R&B emphasis takes away time from Wells' strength—his harp-playing." The Ottawa Citizen determined that, "whether it's his slip-sliding voice or his fabulously expressive harp playing, Wells lets his guests have some room, but lets them know when they've worn out their welcome and it's time to hit the road."

The Washington Post said that "Wells fuses blues and soul music with cunning and conviction." JazzTimes determined that Wells "plays dynamics brilliantly, crooning in a sly, smooth manner of Al Green's before letting loose with an intense James Brown scream or a throaty Southside Chicago growl." The Santa Cruz Sentinel opined that the opening track "could almost qualify as 'adult alternative blues,' if there was such a category."

AllMusic deemed Everybody's Gettin' Some "the most worthless Wells album ever."

== Track listing ==
No.	Title	Length
1.	"Sweet Sixteen"
2.	"Everybody's Gettin' Them Some"
3.	"I Can't Stand No Signifyin'"
4.	"Get Down"
5.	"Keep On Steppin'"
6.	"Shaky Ground"
7.	"You're Tough Enough"
8.	"Use Me"
9.	"Trying to Get Over You"
10.	"Last Hand of the Night"
11.	"Don't You Lie to Me"
12.	"That's What Love Will Make You Do"
