= Come On in This House =

Studio album by Junior Wells
- Released: 1996
- Genre: Blues
- Length: 69:20
- Label: Telarc
- Producer: John Snyder

Junior Wells chronology
| Everybody's Gettin' Some (1995) | Come On in This House (1996) | Live at Buddy Guy's Legends (1997) |

Come On in This House is an album by the American musician Junior Wells. Released in 1996, it was Wells's final studio album. He supported it with a North American tour.

The album was nominated for a Grammy Award for "Best Traditional Blues Album". It won the W. C. Handy Award for best Traditional Blues Album.

== Production ==
The album was produced by John Snyder; it was encoded in surround-sound. The title track was written by Mel London. "Give Me One Reason" is a cover of the Tracy Chapman song. Corey Harris, Sonny Landreth, and Derek Trucks were among the slide guitarists who contributed to the album.

== Critical reception ==
Professional ratings
Review scores
| Source | Rating |
|---|---|
| AllMusic | 4.5/5 stars |
| Chicago Tribune | 3/4 stars |
| The Encyclopedia of Popular Music | 4/5 stars |
| MusicHound Blues: The Essential Album Guide | 4/5 stars |
| The Penguin Guide to Blues Recordings | 4/4 stars |
| Philadelphia Daily News | 4/5 stars |

The Philadelphia Inquirer noted that the "spare arrangements show that Wells is still a sly, crafty player." The Chicago Tribune praised the "sly rendition of swamp rocker Bobby Charles' 'Why Are People Like That?'"

The Buffalo News concluded that "no one is overshadowing Wells' soulful harp, or his bluesy voice, surprisingly intact at 62 after a career spent in smoky clubs." The Rocky Mountain News determined that "the bluesman still sounds warm and supple, or edgy and anguished, as the mood requires."

AllMusic called the album "a virtual slide-guitar mini-fest and a demonstration of the timeless appeal of classic blues done well." MusicHound Blues: The Essential Album Guide deemed it "a top-notch album cut years after Wells was written off as a creative force."

== Track listing ==
| No. | Title | Length |
|---|---|---|
| 1. | "What My Momma Told Me / That's All Right" |
| 2. | "Why Are People Like That?" |
| 3. | "Trust My Baby" |
| 4. | "Million Years Blues" |
| 5. | "Give Me One Reason" |
| 6. | "Ships on the Ocean" |
| 7. | "She Wants to Sell My Monkey" |
| 8. | "So Glad You're Mine" |
| 9. | "Mystery Train" |
| 10. | "I'm Gonna Move to Kansas City" |
| 11. | "King Fish Blues" |
| 12. | "You Better Watch Yourself" |
| 13. | "Come On in This House" |
| 14. | "The Goat" |

== Personnel ==
- Guitar: Tab Benoit, Alvin Youngblood Hart, Bob Margolin
- Slide guitar: Sonny Landreth, John Mooney, Derek Trucks
- Steel guitar: Corey Harris, Sonny Landreth
- Bass: Bob Sunda
- Piano: Jon Cleary
- Drums: Herman "Roscoe" Ernest III
- Harmonica: Junior Wells
