= Hoodoo Man Blues =

Studio album by Junior Wells' Chicago Blues Band
- Released: November 1965
- Recorded: September 22–23, 1965
- Genres: Blues, Chicago blues
- Length: 46:30
- Label: Delmark
- Producer: Bob Koester

Junior Wells' Chicago Blues Band chronology
Hoodoo Man Blues (1965)	It's My Life, Baby! (1966)

Hoodoo Man Blues is the debut album of blues vocalist and harmonica player Junior Wells, performing with the Junior Wells' Chicago Blues Band, an early collaboration with guitarist Buddy Guy. Released on LP by Delmark Records in November 1965, the album has been subsequently reissued on CD and LP by Delmark and Analogue Productions.

The album of Chicago blues music was solicited by Bob Koester, the founder of Delmark Records, who liked Wells' music enough to give the musician considerable freedom on the album despite concerns of commercial response. The resultant innovative album became Delmark's bestseller, establishing Wells' career and receiving critical acclaim as being among the best albums Wells ever produced and among the greatest blues albums ever made.

== Background ==
Record producer Bob Koester, the founder of Delmark Records who is credited with discovering Wells along with producer Sam Charters, recalls that at the time he was considering releasing an album by Wells, he was anxious about both the audience for Wells' music and the expense of studio time and sidemen, but that he liked the music too much to resist. Wells was given the liberty to select his own sidemen and tracklist, without the usual limitation of songs two or three minutes long, and the album that resulted became Delmark's then bestseller, a distinction unsurpassed as of 2003.

Koester remembers particular complications working with Guy, who was incorrectly believed to be legally entailed with Leonard Chess of Chess Records. Chess approved Guy's participation on the album but refused to allow Guy's name to be listed in the credits until it was realized that his participation was not contractually disallowed. Guy was, at the time of release, credited as "Friendly Chap", a name proposed by Peter Brown, who later founded Down with the Game Records in the UK, with the explanation that "A buddy is a friend, a guy is a chap". For parts of the session, Guy's guitar amplifier was not working, and his guitar was wired instead through the Leslie speaker of the studio's Hammond organ. Koester said, "I've always been amazed at how rarely reviewers commented on the guitar-organ tracks".

Koester also recalls that 15 minutes of "releasable music", including a duet between Guy and Wells, was lost, with the tapes probably having been used later to record a rehearsal.

Wells related to the Chicago Tribune in 1993 that the song from which the title of the album was drawn almost didn't make the album. He had recorded "Hoodoo Man Blues" on a 78 rpm record years before, but when the song was presented to radio personnel for possible rotation they had rejected it violently, throwing it on the floor and stomping on it. Wells, too disappointed to want to try again, credits Koester's encouragement with the song's presence on the album.

== Reception ==
Professional ratings
Review scores
Source	Rating
AllMusic	4.5/5 stars
The Penguin Guide to Blues Recordings	3.5/4 stars

The album, characterized by Little Labels—Big Sound as "blatantly non-commercial", demonstrated to audiences that Chicago Blues could be effectively captured on album. "[O]ne of the first to fully document the smoky ambience of a night at a West side nightspot in the superior acoustics of a recording studio", according to Bill Dahl of AllMusic, it popularized Wells, opening doors for him at other, larger studios. But though it was only the first of many successful albums for Wells, it remains among his most acclaimed. Rolling Stone, in a 1970 review of Wells' later album South Side Blues Jam, declared it "a classic, some of the best blues Chicago has to offer". In 1998, The New York Times described it as among the artist's best-recorded works. In 2008, The Times declared it to be Wells' "most celebrated album". In their 2005 biography of Howlin' Wolf, James Segrest and Mark Hoffman wrote that it is usually cited by critics as "one of the greatest blues albums ever released."

== Track listing ==
Titles, songwriting credits, and running times are taken from the original Delmark LP record album liner notes and record label. Other sources may show different listings.

Original album

Side one
No.	Title	Writer(s)	Length
1.	"Snatch It Back and Hold It"	Junior Wells	2:53
2.	"Ships on the Ocean"	Wells	4:07
3.	"Good Morning Schoolgirl"	Traditional – public domain (Note: Sonny Boy Williamson I first recorded "Good Morning, School Girl" in 1937)	3:50
4.	"Hound Dog"	Big Mama Thornton (Note: "Hound Dog" is usually credited to Jerry Leiber and Mike Stoller, see Hound Dog § "Litigation")	2:12
5.	"In the Wee Hours"	Wells, Buddy Guy (Note: Big Bill Broonzy recorded "Wee Wee Hours Blues" in 1941)	3:42
6.	"Hey Lawdy Mama"	Traditional – public domain (Note: Buddy Moss recorded "Oh Lordy Mama" in 1934)	3:10

Side two
No.	Title	Writer(s)	Length
1.	"Hoodoo Man Blues"	Wells (Note: Sonny Boy Williamson I recorded "Hoodoo Hoodoo" in 1946)	2:49
2.	"Early in the Morning"	Traditional – public domain (Note: Sonny Boy Williamson I recorded "Early in the Morning" in 1937)	4:44
3.	"We're Ready"	Guy, Wells	3:33
4.	"You Don't Love Me, Baby"	Wells (Note: Willie Cobbs recorded "You Don't Love Me" in 1960)	2:58
5.	"Chitlin Con Carne"	Kenny Burrell (Note: Kenny Burrell recorded "Chitlins con Carne" in 1963)	2:12
6.	"Yonder Wall"	Traditional – public domain (Note: James "Beale Street" Clark recorded "Get Ready to Meet Your Man" in 1945)	4:10

Delmark CD reissue additional material
No.	Title	Length
13.	"Hoodoo Man Blues (alternate take)"	2:50
14.	"Chitlin Con Carne (alternate take)"	3:20

== Personnel ==
Musicians

- Junior Wells – harmonica, vocals
- Buddy Guy (originally billed as Friendly Chap) – guitar, vocals
- Jack Myers – bass
- Bill Warren – drums

Technical personnel

- Bob Koester – producer, liner notes, supervisor
- Stu Black – engineer
- Roger Seibel – digital mastering
- Zbigniew Jastrzebski – cover design
- Greg Roberts (a.k.a. Bob Koester) – photography
