= All Star Chicago Blues Session =

Compilation album by Phil Guy
- Released: 1994
- Recorded: March 1982
- Studios: Soto Sound Studio, Chicago
- Genre: Blues
- Length: 63:55
- Label: JSP
- Producer: Phil Guy

All Star Chicago Blues Session is a compilation album by blues musician Phil Guy. It features the complete session recorded at the Soto Sound Studio in March 1982.

== Background and recordings ==
Phil Guy and his brother, Buddy Guy, recorded several songs at the Soto Sound Studio in Chicago in March 1982. These tracks were later released separately on Phil Guy's albums The Red Hot Blues of Phil Guy in 1982 and Bad Luck Boy in 1983. “All Star Chicago Blues Session” is a compilation of these two albums. The original tracks were remixed.

== Track listing ==
1. "Breakin' Out On Top" – 7:26
2. "Texas Flood" – 5:46
3. "Blues With A Feeling" – 6:22
4. "Red Dress" – 4:11
5. "Ice Around My Heart" – 8:55
6. "Bad Luck Boy" – 9:11
7. "Wine Head Woman" – 3:53*
8. "Skin & Bones / Money" – 8:25
9. "Love Is Like Quicksand" – 5:04
10. "Garbage Man Blues” – 4:42

Note

- Track 5 was titled “Cold Feeling”, track 7 titled "Winehead" on the original vinyl.

== Personnel ==
- Phil Guy – guitar, vocals
- Buddy Guy – guitar
- Doug Williams – guitar
- Professor Eddie Lusk – keyboards
- J. W. Williams – bass
- Ray Allison – drums
- Maurice John Vaughn – saxophone (tracks 1, 3, 5–8)
- Larry Cox – harmonica (tracks 3, 4)
