= Overblowing =

Wind instrument playing technique

Overblowing is the manipulation of supplied air through a wind instrument that causes the sounded pitch to jump to a higher one without a fingering change or the operation of a slide. Overblowing may involve a change in the air pressure, in the point at which the air is directed, or in the resonance characteristics of the chamber formed by the mouth and throat of the player. (The latter is a feature of embouchure.)

In some instruments, overblowing involves the direct manipulation of the vibrating reed(s), and/or the pushing of a register key while otherwise leaving fingering unaltered. With the exception of harmonica overblowing, the pitch jump is from one vibratory mode of the reed or air column, e.g., its fundamental, to an overtone. Overblowing can be done deliberately in order to get a higher pitch, or inadvertently, resulting in the production of a note other than intended.

== Characteristics ==
In simple woodwind instruments, overblowing can cause the pitch to change into a different register. For example, a player of the tin whistle can play in the upper octave by blowing harder while using the same fingering as in the lower octave.

In brass instruments, overblowing (sometimes combined with tightening of the embouchure) produces a different harmonic.

In beating, or striking, reed wind instruments such as the saxophone, clarinet, and oboe, the transition from lower to higher register is aided by a "register key" which encourages a vibration node at a particular point in the pipe such that a higher harmonic is produced.

Another type of overblowing is that used on instruments such as the transverse flute, where the direction of the airstream is altered in order to sound higher notes. This technique can also be demonstrated when blowing across the top of a glass bottle (beer bottle, wine bottle, etc.) to produce a pitch.

Overblowing can also mean blowing too hard merely in order to hear oneself. For example, on a stage with amplified instruments and an inadequate monitoring system, a saxophone player may just blow harder than they would otherwise want to, the result being a worse sound and often worse intonation or unwanted overtones.

== Bagpipes ==
Some bagpipes, most importantly the uilleann pipes, are capable of overblowing in the sense of jumping to a higher pitch, though most bagpipes are not normally played in this way. Among Highland pipers, the term more often refers to a problem affecting the steadiness and reliability of the pitch and tone caused by an excess of air pressure. When a piper plays, a rhythm is set up between blowing into the blowstick and squeezing the bag. Often, a piper will over-squeeze the bag while still exhaling, causing a pipe to cease to sound or to vary its tone and pitch.

== Harmonica ==
Overblowing is an important modern technique among players of some harmonica types, notably the standard Richter-tuned harmonica or blues harp. Combined with note bending, it yields the full chromatic scale across the instrument's range. Though pioneered on Richter-tuned harps, overblowing, or the related overdrawing thus together sometimes called overbending though not much related to bending per se, is possible on any harmonica having both a blow reed and a draw reed mounted in the same airway (i.e., behind the same mouthpiece hole), but no windsaver valve on the higher-pitched of the two reeds. While superficially resembling in its pitch-jumping effect the overblowing of other (beating-reed, aerophone, brass) wind instruments, harmonica overblowing is completely unrelated from the standpoint of the underlying physics. It does not induce the sounding reed to sound a higher overtone – free reed overtones do not even begin to approximate the harmonic series nor are they particularly musical – nor does it induce a higher vibrational mode in air in a pipe or other resonator – harmonicas generally have no such resonator. Rather, it silences the sounding reed while eliciting sound from the formerly silent one – the one that normally responds to air flowing in the opposite direction. A key fact for understanding both overblowing and bending on such an instrument: a free reed mounted over a reedplate slot will normally respond to air flows that pull it initially into the slot, i.e., as a closing reed, but, at only slightly higher air pressure from the opposite side, will also respond as an opening reed; the resulting pitch is generally just less than a semitone higher than the closing-reed pitch.

Overblown notes can be played as softly as any other note on the instrument. Proper embouchure alone will cause the closing reed to cease vibrating and induce the opening reed to start. Overblow notes are naturally flat but can be bent up to the correct pitch. An overblow consists of two steps: the closing reed must be choked (silenced), and the opening reed must be sounded. A clean overblow note requires that both of these steps be executed simultaneously. Overblowing technique also has been described as not much different from doing a blow bend, except on a draw-bend-only reed (holes 1–6), and doing a draw bend embouchure, except on a blow-bend-only reed (holes 7–10). The latter technique is also known as the "overdraw" due to the reversed airflow, and these techniques are sometimes collectively referred to as "overbends".

Certain modifications to factory-built harmonicas can increase the sensitivity of the instrument and make overblows far easier to achieve. Lowering the reed gap (over the reedplate) and slightly narrowing reed slots (a process called embossing) are probably the most common customization methods used to set up overblow-friendly harmonicas. Because it involves both reeds in the chamber, overblowing is not possible on fully valved harmonicas such as the button chromatic.

Notable practitioners of overblowing are Howard Levy, a founding member of the Flecktones, Paulo Prot, Adam Gussow, Otavio Castro, Chris Michalek, Jason Ricci, and Carlos del Junco.

== Woodwinds ==
In the case of the clarinet, the reed beats against its mouthpiece, opening and closing the instrument's cylindrical closed tube to produce a tone. When the instrument is overblown, with or without the aid of its register key, the pitch is a twelfth higher. In the case of a saxophone, which has a similar mouthpiece-reed combination to the clarinet, or an oboe, where double reeds beat against each other, the conical bore of these instruments gives their closed tube the properties of an open tube; when overblown, the pitch jumps an octave higher. As for a flute, which does not have a reed, but rather is a reedless cylindrical instrument open at both ends, the pitch similarly increases by an octave.

== Pipe organ ==
Some organ pipe ranks are designed to be overblown. For instance, a given pipe of the harmonic flute stop is twice the length of pipes of other stops designed to sound the same pitch. When such a pipe is overblown, it sounds a fundamental tone one octave higher than other pipes of its length. For instance, a harmonic flute pipe that is 16 feet long is designed to sound the same note as most 8-foot pipes.
