= Left My Blues in San Francisco =

Studio album by Buddy Guy
- Released: 1967
- Recorded: 1962, 1965 – 1967
- Studios: Ter-Mar, Chicago
- Genre: Blues
- Length: 32:03
- Label: Chess (#LP 1527/LPS 1527)
- Producer: Gene Barge

Buddy Guy chronology
Left My Blues in San Francisco (1967)	A Man and the Blues (1968)

Left My Blues in San Francisco is the debut studio album by American blues artist Buddy Guy, released in 1967. Future Rotary Connection producer and keyboardist Charles Stepney provided orchestration and drums on some tracks. The album is a mix of older blues tunes and three Buddy Guy originals.

== Critical reception ==
Professional ratings
Review scores
Source	Rating
AllMusic	4.5/5 stars
The Encyclopedia of Popular Music	3/5 stars
The New Rolling Stone Album Guide	3.5/5 stars

Reviewing a reissue, The Advocate wrote that "the album’s hodgepodge of styles—soul, rhythm and blues, pop and blues—forms a fascinating time capsule from which Guy’s irrepressible personality and fiery guitar do emerge."

== Track listing ==
Side one
No.	Title	Writer(s)	Length
1.	"Keep It to Myself"	Sonny Boy Williamson	2:30
2.	"Crazy Love"	Willie Dixon	2:20
3.	"I Suffer with the Blues"	Guy	2:44
4.	"When My Left Eye Jumps"	Willie Dixon, Al Perkins	3:53
5.	"Buddy's Groove"	Gene Barge	3:42

Side two
No.	Title	Writer(s)	Length
1.	"Goin' Home"	Willie Dixon	2:39
2.	"She Suits Me to a Tee"	Guy	2:14
3.	"Leave My Girl Alone"	Guy	3:25
4.	"Too Many Ways"	Willie Dixon	2:14
5.	"Mother-in-Law Blues"	Gene Barge	2:41
6.	"Every Girl I See"	Willie Dixon, Michael M.P. Murphy	3:41

== Personnel ==
- Buddy Guy - lead guitar, lead vocals
- Gene Barge - tenor saxophone on tracks 1, 2, 7, 9, 10 and 11, production & orchestration
- Lefty Bates - rhythm guitar on track 4
- Milton Bland - tenor saxophone on track 8
- Reggie Boyd - bass guitar on tracks 2, 9, and 11
- Jarrett Gibson - tenor saxophone on track 4
- Lafayette Leake - Hammond organ on track 4
- Abe Locke - tenor saxophone on track 4
- Jack Meyers - bass on track 4
- Matt "Guitar" Murphy - guitar on tracks 2, 8, 9 and 11
- A.C. Reed - tenor saxophone on track 8
- Leroy Stewart - bass guitar on track 8
- Charles Stepney - orchestration, drums on tracks 1, 7, and 10
- Phil Thomas - drums on tracks 2, 4, 9, and 11
- Sonny Turner - trumpet on track 4
- Phil Upchurch - bass guitar on tracks 1, 7, and 10
- Murray Watson - trumpet on track 4

A number of the names of the musicians who contributed to these sessions have been lost to posterity. These are the baritone saxophonist on tracks 1, 7 and 10; bassist on tracks 3, 5 and 6; drummer on tracks 3, 5, 6 and 8; rhythm guitarist on tracks 1, 5, 7 and 10; organist on tracks 3 and 8; pianist on tracks 1, 2, 5, 6, 7, 9, 10 and 11; and tenor saxophonist on tracks 1, 5, 6, 7 and 10

Technical

- Ron Malo - recording supervisor, engineer
- Max Cooperstein - supervision
- Jerry Griffith - album design, cover photography
- Bill Utterback - illustration
