= Buddy Guy =

American blues guitarist and singer (born 1936)

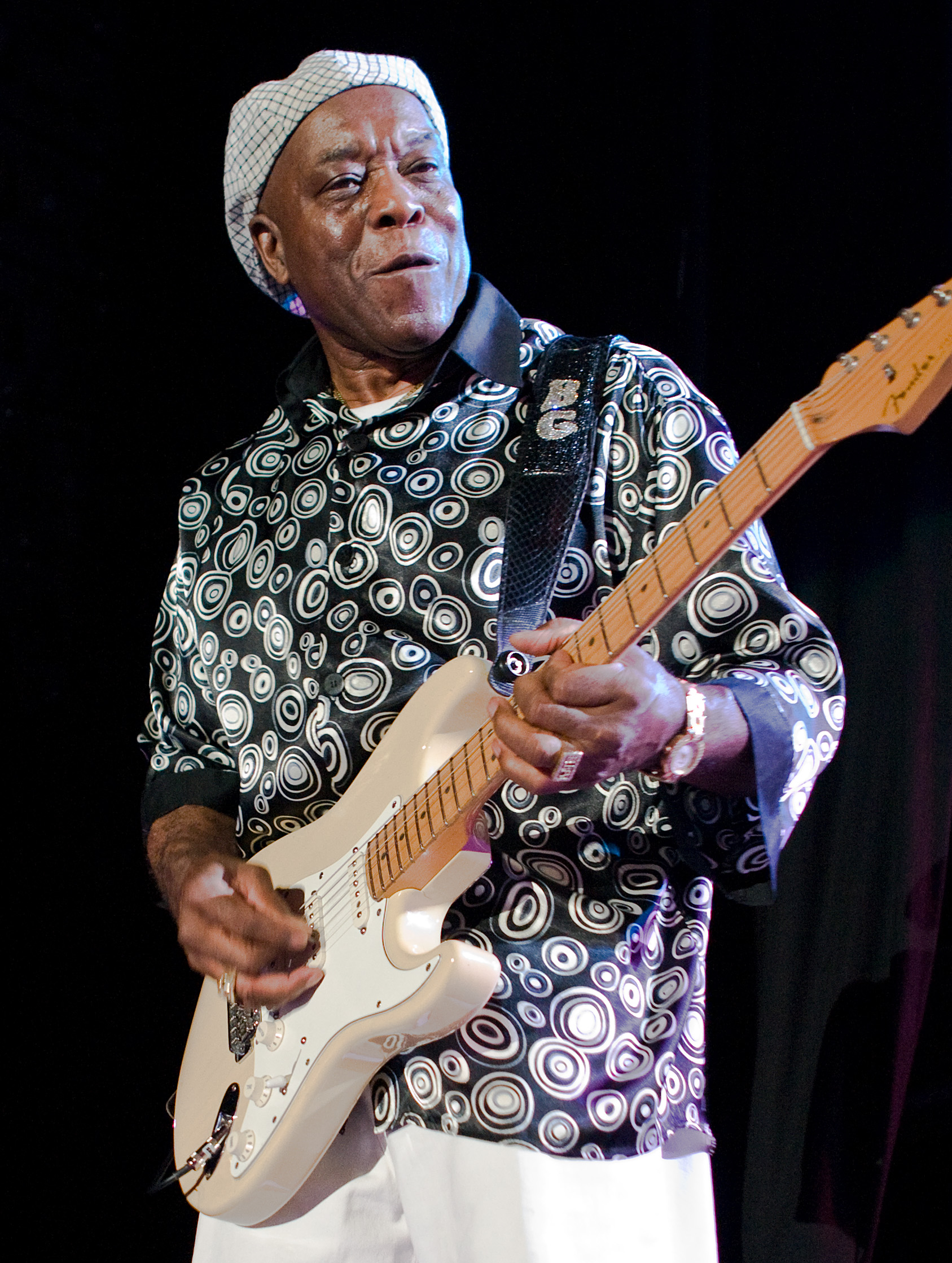
- Guy performing in 2008

Background information
- Born: George Guy; July 30, 1936 (age 90); Lettsworth, Louisiana, U.S.
- Genres: Chicago blues; blues; electric blues; blues rock
- Occupations: Musician; singer; songwriter
- Instruments: Guitar; vocals
- Years active: 1953–present
- Labels: RCA; Cobra; Chess; Delmark; Silvertone; MCA; Atlantic; MPS; Charly; Zomba Group; Jive; Vanguard; JSP; Rhino; Purple Pyramid; Flyright; AIM; Alligator; Blues Ball
- Spouse(s): Joan Guy (m. 1959), Jennifer Guy (1975-2002)
- Website: buddyguy.net

George "Buddy" Guy (born July 30, 1936) is an American blues guitarist and singer-songwriter. He is an exponent of Chicago blues who has influenced generations of guitarists including Eric Clapton, Jimi Hendrix, Jimmy Page, Keith Richards, Stevie Ray Vaughan, Jeff Beck, Gary Clark Jr., and John Mayer. In the 1960s, Guy played with Muddy Waters as a session guitarist at Chess Records and began a musical partnership with blues harp virtuoso Junior Wells.

Guy has won nine Grammy Awards and a Lifetime Achievement Award, the National Medal of Arts, and the Kennedy Center Honors. Guy was inducted into the Rock & Roll Hall of Fame in 2005 and ranked 27th in Rolling Stone magazine's 2023 list of greatest guitarists of all time. His song "Stone Crazy" was ranked 78th in the Rolling Stone list of the "100 Greatest Guitar Songs of All Time". Clapton once described him as "the best guitar player alive". In 1999, Guy wrote the book Damn Right I've Got the Blues, with Donald Wilcock. His autobiography, When I Left Home: My Story, was published in 2012.

== Early life ==
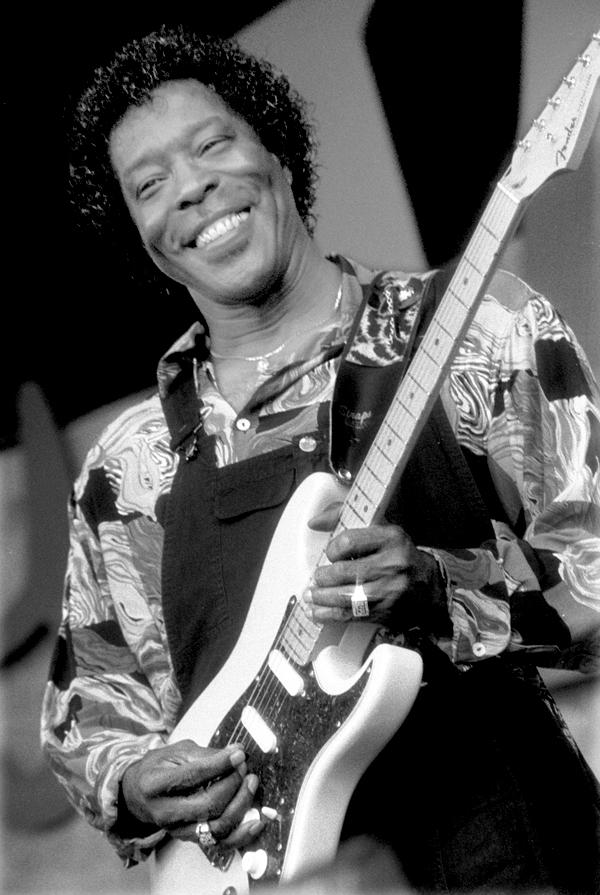
Guy at the Monterey Jazz Festival, 1992

George "Buddy" Guy was born and raised in Lettsworth, Louisiana. He was the first of five children born to parents Sam and Isabel, who were sharecroppers, and as a child, Guy would pick cotton for $2.50 per 100 pounds. His brother Phil Guy was also a blues musician. He began learning to play the guitar using a two-string diddley bow he made. Later he was given a Harmony acoustic guitar which, decades later in Guy's lengthy career, was donated to the Rock and Roll Hall of Fame.

== Career ==
In the mid-1950s, Guy began performing with bands in Baton Rouge, including with Big Papa Tilley and Raful Neal. While living there, he worked as a custodian at Louisiana State University. In 1957, he recorded two demos for a local DJ in Baton Rouge for Ace Records, but they were not issued at the time.

Soon after moving to Chicago on September 25, 1957, Guy fell under the influence of Muddy Waters. In 1958, a competition with West Side guitarists Magic Sam and Otis Rush gave Guy a record contract. Soon afterwards he recorded for Cobra Records. During his Cobra sessions, he teamed up with Ike Turner who helped him make his second record, "You Sure Can't Do" / "This Is The End", by backing him on guitar and composing the latter. After two releases from Cobra's subsidiary, Artistic, Guy signed with Chess Records.

Guy's early career was impeded by his record company, Chess Records, his label from 1959 to 1968, which refused to record Guy playing in the novel style of his live shows. Leonard Chess, Chess Records founder, denounced Guy's playing as "just making noise". In the early 1960s, Chess tried recording Guy as a solo artist with R&B ballads, jazz instrumentals, soul and novelty dance tunes, but none of these recordings were released as a single. Guy's only Chess album, I Left My Blues in San Francisco, was released in 1967. Most of the songs were influenced by the era's soul boom, with orchestrations by Gene Barge and Charlie Stepney. Chess used Guy mainly as a session guitarist to back Muddy Waters, Howlin' Wolf, Little Walter, Sonny Boy Williamson, Koko Taylor and others. As late as 1967, Guy worked as a tow truck driver while playing clubs at night.

During his tenure with Chess, Guy recorded sessions with Junior Wells for Delmark Records under the pseudonym Friendly Chap in 1965 and 1966. In 1965, he participated in the European tour American Folk Blues Festival.

He appeared onstage at the March 1969 "Supershow" in Staines, England, which also included Eric Clapton, Led Zeppelin, Jack Bruce, Stephen Stills, Buddy Miles, Glenn Campbell, Roland Kirk, Jon Hiseman, and the Misunderstood. In 1972, he established The Checkerboard Lounge, with partner L.C. Thurman. He left it in 1985 and reported in a 2024 interview that it never made money.

Guy's career was revived during the blues revival of the late 1980s and early 1990s. His resurgence was sparked by Clapton's request that Guy be part of the "24 Nights" all-star blues guitar lineup at London's Royal Albert Hall. Guy subsequently signed with Silvertone Records and recorded his mainstream breakthrough album Damn Right, I've Got the Blues in 1991.

Guy had a small role in the 2009 crime film In the Electric Mist as Sam "Hogman" Patin.

In June 2024, he headlined the Chicago Blues Festival as part of his "Buddy Guy Damn Right Farewell Tour." Guy appeared in a mid-credits cameo scene of Ryan Coogler's 2025 period horror film Sinners. Guy plays the older version of one of the film's supporting characters, Sammie, an aspiring blues artist wielding a 1932 Dobro resonator guitar. For his work on the film, Guy received Variety's inaugural Living Legend/Iconic Collaboration in Film award in December 2025.

He voiced the character DJ Buddy, radio host of Gloriana Blues Radio, in the 2026 video game Grand Theft Auto VI.

== Artistry and legacy ==
=== Music style ===
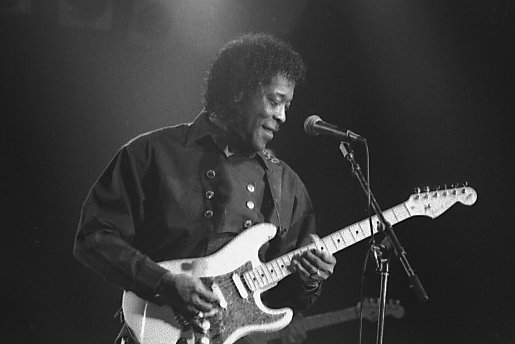
Guy in 1993, performing in Toronto, Canada

A performer of Chicago blues, Guy established a musical style that frequently incorporated influences from other genres.

As the New York Times music critic Jon Pareles noted in 2005,

Mr. Guy, 68, mingles anarchy, virtuosity, deep blues and hammy shtick in ways that keep all eyes on him.... [Guy] loves extremes: sudden drops from loud to soft, or a sweet, sustained guitar solo followed by a jolt of speed, or a high, imploring vocal cut off with a rasp.... Whether he's singing with gentle menace or bending new curves into a blue note, he is a master of tension and release, and his every wayward impulse was riveting.

In an interview taped on April 14, 2000, for the Cleveland college station WRUW-FM, Guy said,

The purpose of me trying to play the kind of rocky stuff is to get airplay...I find myself kind of searching, hoping I'll hit the right notes, say the right things, maybe they'll put me on one of these big stations, what they call 'classic'...if you get Eric Clapton to play a Muddy Waters song, they call it classic, and they will put it on that station, but you'll never hear Muddy Waters.

=== Guitars ===
Guy has played numerous guitars over the course of his career and continues to use multiple guitars in concerts and recordings, but he has become known for his custom model Fenders with their characteristic Polka-dot finish. In a June 2022 interview, Guy explained that the Polka-dot pattern was a tribute to his late mother, and to remind him of a lie he told her when leaving home to start his career in Chicago:

Back to about my mother and that Polka dot, I lied to her and I told her I'ma make double the money, I'ma send you some money, and I'ma drive back down here to Louisianna—I'm trying to make her feel good—in a Polka-dot Cadillac. And I knew I was lyin' and I knew I didn't never want to buy a Polka dot 'cause if you got famous, that polka dot would show up everywhere there where you went, you couldn't rest 'cause sometime I try to go to dinner now in Brazil or Germany or wherever and if they recognize you, if you're going to your mouth with a fork they'll come grab your hand and say 'will you sign this?' [...] So anyway, my mother passed away and I said 'Oh man I didn't get a chance to tell her I lied to her about that Polka-dot Cadillac,' and I went to fender and I said 'I need something to remind me of that big lie I told my mom about that Polka-dot Cadillac.' I said 'I'd like to get a Polka-dot guitar made so I'd have that with me the rest of my life.'

The original guitar was based on the Eric Clapton Custom Shop Stratocaster that Guy had been playing in the late 1980s and has since been developed into its own line of Buddy Guy Signature models that Fender sells to the public. Various models of the Polka-dot guitar and Polka-dot motif feature in the artwork for a number of his albums since 1994's Slippin' In. Recent years saw him on stage wearing a shirt of the same design.

=== Accolades ===
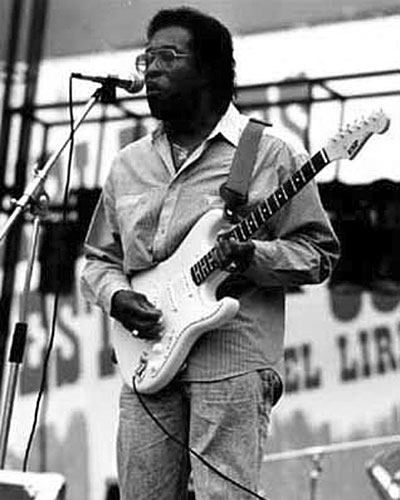
Buddy Guy at the Liri Blues Festival, Italy, in 1989

When inducting Guy into the Rock and Roll Hall of Fame, Eric Clapton said: "No matter how great the song, or performance, my ear would always find him out. He stood out in the mix, simply by virtue of the originality and vitality of his playing."

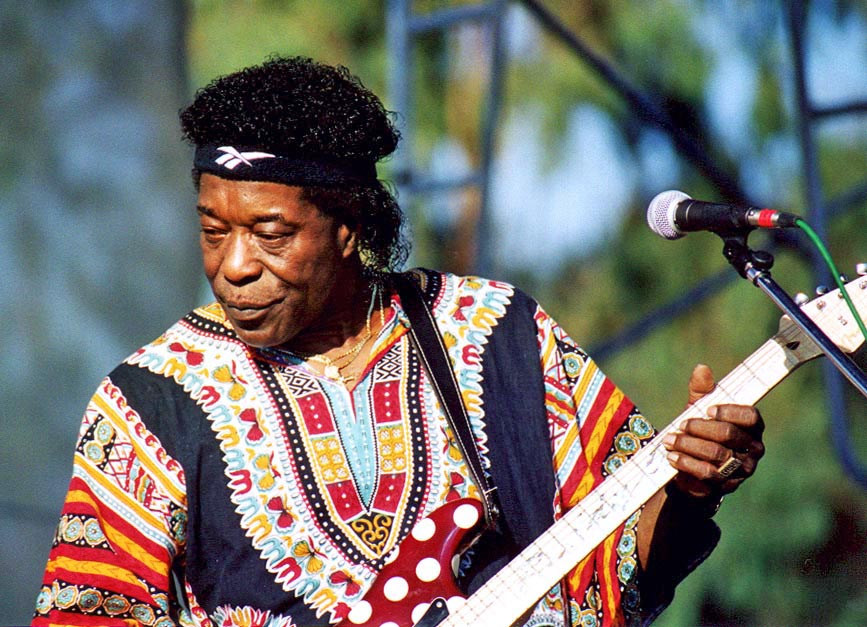
Guy performing in 1998

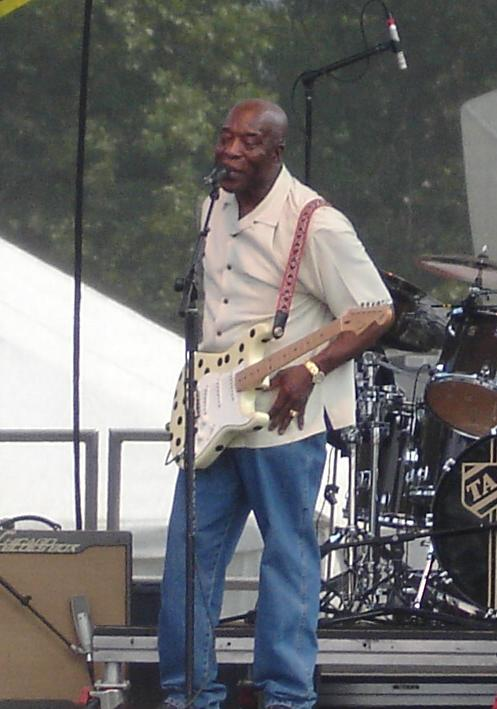
Guy performing at the Bonnaroo Music Festival in 2006

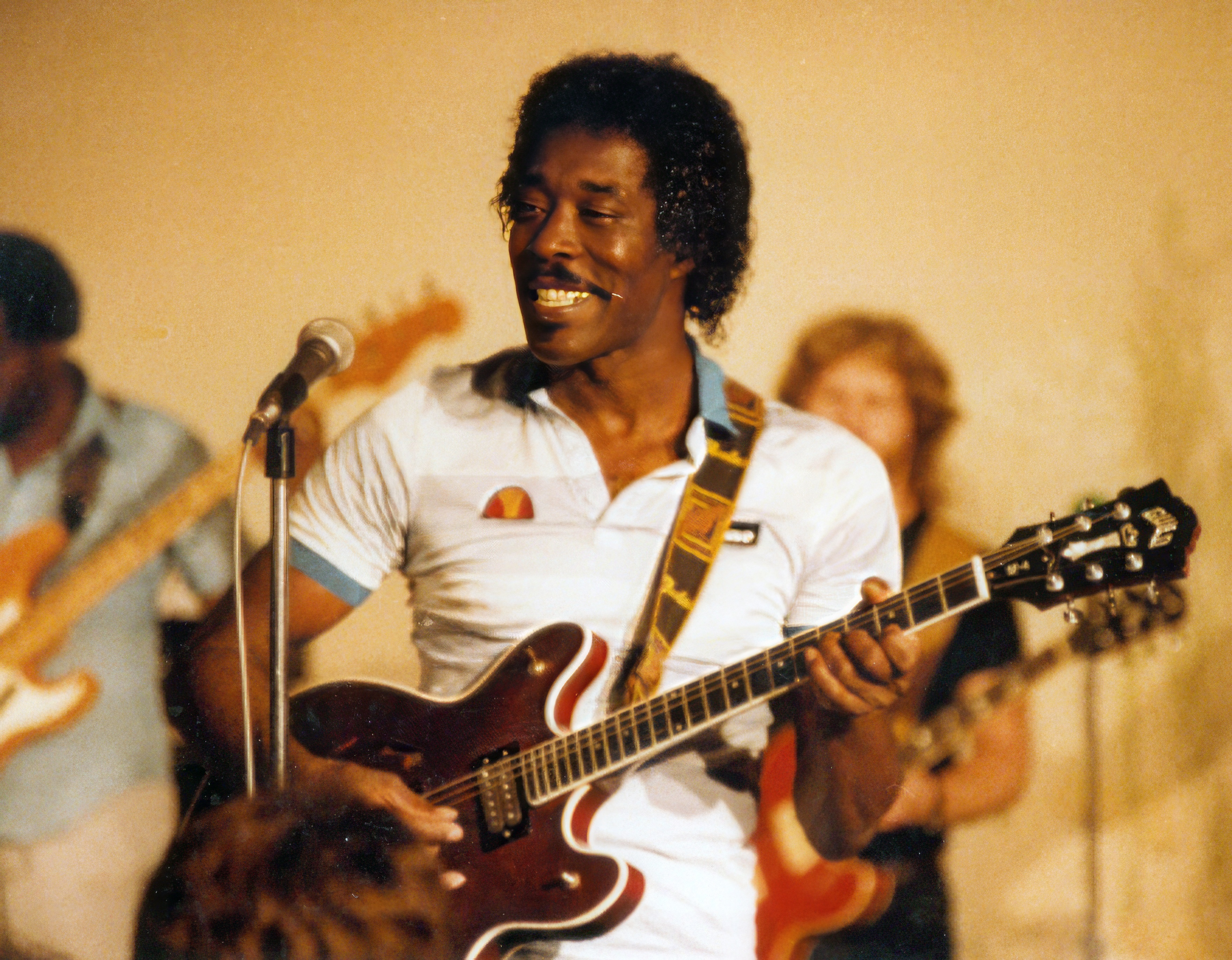
In Urbana, Illinois, 1983

Jeff Beck recalled the night he and Stevie Ray Vaughan performed with Guy at Buddy Guy's Legends club in Chicago: "That was just the most incredible stuff I ever heard in my life. The three of us all jammed and it was so thrilling. That is as close you can come to the heart of the blues."

Former Rolling Stones bassist Bill Wyman said:

Guitar Legends do not come any better than Buddy Guy. He is feted by his peers and loved by his fans for his ability to make the guitar both talk and cry the blues. Such is Buddy's mastery of the guitar that there is virtually no guitarist that he cannot imitate.

Guy was a judge for the 6th and 8th annual Independent Music Awards to support independent artists.

Guy has influenced the styles of subsequent artists, such as Reggie Sears and Jesse Marchant of JBM.

On February 21, 2012, Guy performed in concert at the White House for President Barack Obama and First Lady Michelle Obama. During the finale of the concert, he persuaded President Obama to sing a few bars of "Sweet Home Chicago".

== Awards ==
On September 20, 1996, Guy was inducted into Guitar Center's Hollywood Rockwalk.

Guy has won nine Grammy Awards, for his work on electric and acoustic guitars and for contemporary and traditional forms of blues music, as well as a Lifetime Achievement Award.

In 2003, he was presented with the National Medal of Arts, awarded by the president of the United States to those who have made extraordinary contributions to the creation, growth and support of the arts in the United States.

By 2004, Guy had also earned 23 W.C. Handy Awards, Billboard magazine's Century Award (he was its second recipient) for distinguished artistic achievement, and the title of Greatest Living Electric Blues Guitarist.

Guy was inducted into the Rock and Roll Hall of Fame on March 14, 2005, by Eric Clapton and B.B. King. Clapton recalled seeing Guy perform in London's Marquee Club in 1965, impressing him with his technique, his looks and his charismatic showmanship. He remembered seeing Guy pick the guitar with his teeth and play it over his head—two tricks that later influenced Jimi Hendrix. Guy's acceptance speech was concise: "If you don't think you've got the blues, just keep living." He had previously served on the nominating committee of the Rock and Roll Hall of Fame.

In 2008, Guy was inducted into the Louisiana Music Hall of Fame, performing at the Texas Club in Baton Rouge to commemorate the occasion.

In October 2009, he performed "Let Me Love You Baby" with Jeff Beck at the 25th anniversary concert at the Rock & Roll Hall of Fame.

On November 15, 2010, he performed a live set for Guitar Center Sessions on DirecTV. The episode also included an interview with Guy by program host Nic Harcourt.

On December 2, 2012, Guy was awarded the 2012 Kennedy Center Honors. At his induction, Kennedy Center chairman David Rubenstein said, "Buddy Guy is a titan of the blues and has been a tremendous influence on virtually everyone who has picked up an electric guitar in the last half century". In a musical tribute to Guy, blues vocal powerhouse Beth Hart, accompanied by guitarist Jeff Beck, sang a rousing version of "I'd Rather Go Blind". Also honored that night were actor Dustin Hoffman, surviving members of the rock band Led Zeppelin (John Paul Jones, Jimmy Page and Robert Plant), comedian and late-night TV host David Letterman and prima ballerina and choreographer Natalia Makarova.

On January 28, 2014, Guy was inducted into the Musicians Hall of Fame and Museum.

In 2015, Guy received a Grammy Lifetime Achievement Award from the National Academy of Recording Arts and Sciences.

Born to Play Guitar won a Grammy Award in 2016 for Best Blues Album. Also in 2016, Guy toured the US east coast as the opening act for Jeff Beck.

December 8, 2018, was designated "Buddy Guy Day" by Louisiana and Mississippi officials, and a stretch of Highway 418 through Lettsworth was designated "Buddy Guy Way".

In 2018, Guy was honored with a marker on the Mississippi Blues Trail in Pointe Coupee Parish, Louisiana.

In 2019, Guy received the Golden Plate Award of the American Academy of Achievement presented by Awards Council member Jimmy Page.

In 2026, Guy won the Grammy Award for Best Traditional Blues Album for the album Ain't Done with the Blues at the 68th Annual Grammy Awards. Also in 2026, the Chicago History Museum selected him for the Theodore Thomas Making History Award for Distinction in the Performing Arts.

== Personal life ==
Guy married Joan Guy in 1959. They had six children together: Charlotte (1961), Carlise (1963), Colleen (1965), George Jr., Gregory, and Geoffrey. Greg Guy also plays blues guitar.

He was married to Jennifer Guy from 1975 to 2002. They had two children: Rashawnna and Michael. The marriage ended in divorce. Rashawnna Guy, known by her stage name Shawnna, is a rapper.

Guy lives on 14 acres in Orland Park, Illinois, a suburb south of Chicago, as of 2014. He is an early riser, which he attributes to growing up on a farm. "Doesn’t matter how late I get home from a show, I know I will be up, like, three, four o’clock in the morning.” His only indulgence is a shot of cognac at every show.

== Discography ==
- Left My Blues in San Francisco (1967)
- A Man and the Blues (1968)
- Hold That Plane! (1972)
- The Blues Giant / Stone Crazy! (1979)
- Breaking Out (1980)
- DJ Play My Blues (1982)
- Damn Right, I've Got the Blues (1991)
- Feels Like Rain (1993)
- Slippin' In (1994)
- Heavy Love (1998)
- Sweet Tea (2001)
- Blues Singer (2003)
- Bring 'Em In (2005)
- Skin Deep (2008)
- Living Proof (2010)
- Rhythm & Blues (2013)
- Born to Play Guitar (2015)
- The Blues Is Alive and Well (2018)
- The Blues Don't Lie (2022)
- Ain't Done with the Blues (2025)

=== with Junior Wells ===
- Hoodoo Man Blues (1965)
- Chicago / The Blues / Today!, Vol. 1 (1966)
- It's My Life, Baby! (1966)
- Coming at You (1968)
- Buddy and the Juniors (1970, also with Junior Mance)
- Southside Blues Jam (1970)
- Play the Blues (1972)
- Pleading the Blues (1979)
- Going Back (1981)
- Alone & Acoustic (1991)
- Better Off with the Blues (1993)

=== with Phil Guy ===
- Buddy & Phil (1981)
- The Red Hot Blues of Phil Guy (1982)
- Bad Luck Boy (1983)
- All Star Chicago Blues Session (1994)
- He's My Blues Brother (2006)

=== with Memphis Slim ===
- Southside Reunion (1971)

== Filmography ==
- Jack's Big Music Show (2006) - The King of Swing
- In the Electric Mist (2009) - Sam "Hogman" Patin
- Sinners (2025) - Elder Sammie
- Grand Theft Auto VI - DJ Buddy

== See also ==
- Buddy Guy's Legends
- Checkerboard Lounge
- Chicago Blues Festival
- Montreux Jazz Festival
