= DJ Play My Blues =

- The original vinyl cover

Studio album by Buddy Guy
- Released: 1982
- Recorded: December 1981
- Studio: Soto Sound, Chicago
- Genre: Blues
- Length: 38:17 (LP) / 57:06 (CD 1994) / 63:00 (CD 2004)
- Label: JSP
- Producer: Buddy Guy

Buddy Guy chronology
Breaking Out (1980)	DJ Play My Blues (1982)	Damn Right, I've Got the Blues (1991)

DJ Play My Blues is the sixth studio album by blues musician Buddy Guy, recorded in December 1981 and released on JSP Records in 1982. It was the third in a trio of Guy albums on JSP.

== Background and recordings ==
One year after the release of the slicker and funkier Breaking Out, Buddy Guy and his band entered Soto Sound Studio in Chicago and recorded one of the most remarkable blues albums of the 1980s. Buddy's brother, Phil Guy, was on second guitar. Longtime drummer Ray "Killer" Allison was back again, and there were two new members in Buddy's band: guitarist Doug Williams (a member of Phil Guy's band), and bassist Mike Morrison (who had played with Junior Wells and Willie Dixon).

== Releases ==
The original release includes only seven tracks. A 10-track LP was released in 1991 by Music Box International in Greece. Two of the three new tracks were previously released on Phil Guy's solo albums in 1982 and 1983 (The Garbage Man Blues and Mellow Down), with Phil singing the lead vocals on these songs. The 10-track version was released on a remastered CD by JSP in 1994 with an alternate cover. It was re-released on CD in 2004 (with another alternate cover), including two more tracks.

== Critical reception ==
Professional ratings
Review scores
Source	Rating
AllMusic	4/5 stars
The Penguin Guide to Blues Recordings	3.5/4 stars

AllMusic gave the album four out of five stars and in the review by Chris Nickson, he commented:

This is Buddy Guy playing and feeling the blues, pure and simple, without any sense of compromise – and it's all the better for it, putting much of the rest of his catalog into perspective. Rarely is the blues this heartfelt – and rarer still is it so well played. If this were his only recorded legacy, he'd still warrant the stature he's achieved.

== Original vinyl track listing ==
No.	Title	Writer(s)	Length
1.	"Dedication to the Late T-Bone Walker"		6:58
2.	"Good News"		4:42
3.	"Blues at My Baby's House"		7:02
4.	"She Suits Me to a T"		4:30
5.	"DJ Play My Blues"		5:22
6.	"Just Teasin'"		4:43
7.	"All Your Love"	Otis Rush	4:56

== Re-released vinyl and remastered CD track listing ==
No.	Title	Writer(s)	Length
1.	"Girl You're Nice and Clean"		4:55
2.	"Dedication to the Late T-Bone Walker"		6:58
3.	"Good News"		4:42
4.	"Blues at My Baby's House"		7:07
5.	"She Suits Me to a T"		4:30
6.	"DJ Play My Blues"		5:22
7.	"Just Teasin'"		4:43
8.	"All Your Love"	Otis Rush	4:56
9.	"The Garbage Man Blues"		6:59
10.	"Mellow Down"	Willie Dixon	5:55

== CD 2004 re-release track listing ==
All tracks are written by Buddy Guy, except where noted.

No.	Title	Writer(s)	Length
1.	"Girl You're Nice and Clean"		4:40
2.	"Dedication to the Late T-Bone Walker"		6:56
3.	"Good News"		4:40
4.	"Blues at My Baby's House"		7:02
5.	"She Suits Me to a T"		4:29
6.	"DJ Play My Blues"		5:20
7.	"Just Teasin'"		4:41
8.	"All Your Love"	Otis Rush	5:09
9.	"The Garbage Man Blues"		7:08
10.	"Mellow Down"	Willie Dixon	5:54
11.	"Comin' On"		3:09
12.	"Girl You're Nice and Clean" (Alternative version)		4:54

== Personnel ==
- Buddy Guy – guitar, vocals
- Phil Guy – guitar, vocals on "Garbage Man Blues" and "Mellow Down"
- Doug Williams – guitar
- Mike Morrison – bass
- Ray Allison – drums

Additional:

- Jerry Soto – engineer
- Martin Atkinson – mixing
- John Stedman – liner notes

== Notes ==
All guitar solos were played by Buddy Guy on tracks 1–8 & 12. All three guitarists (Buddy, Phil Guy & Doug Williams) played solos on tracks 9 & 10.
