= A Man and the Blues =

Studio album by Buddy Guy
- Released: 1968
- Recorded: 1968
- Studio: Universal, Chicago
- Genre: Blues
- Length: 37:51
- Label: Vanguard
- Producer: Samuel Charters

Buddy Guy chronology
| Left My Blues in San Francisco (1967) | A Man and the Blues (1968) | Hold That Plane! (1972) |

Professional ratings
Review scores
| Source | Rating |
|---|---|
| AllMusic | 4/5 stars |
| The Encyclopedia of Popular Music | 4/5 stars |
| The Penguin Guide to Blues Recordings | 3.5/4 stars |
| Rolling Stone | (positive) |
| (The New) Rolling Stone Album Guide | 4/5 stars |

A Man and the Blues is the second studio album by blues guitarist Buddy Guy. It was recorded and released in 1968 on Vanguard Records. It features four Guy originals, a cover of Barrett Strong's Tamla Motown hit "Money", and a playful adaptation of the nursery rhyme "Mary Had a Little Lamb", covered in a similar fashion by Stevie Ray Vaughan in the 1980s.

== Track listing ==
| No. | Title | Writer(s) | Length |
|---|---|---|---|
| 1. | "A Man and the Blues" | Buddy Guy | 6:17 |
| 2. | "I Can't Quit the Blues" | Buddy Guy | 3:15 |
| 3. | "Money (That's What I Want)" | Berry Gordy, Janie Bradford | 2:49 |
| 4. | "One Room Country Shack" | Mercy Dee Walton | 5:35 |
| 5. | "Mary Had a Little Lamb" | Traditional; lyrics and music: Buddy Guy | 2:27 |
| 6. | "Just Playing My Axe" | Buddy Guy | 2:50 |
| 7. | "Sweet Little Angel" | B.B. King | 5:35 |
| 8. | "Worry, Worry" | Pluma Davis, Jules Taub | 6:14 |
| 9. | "Jam on a Monday Morning" | Buddy Guy | 2:50 |

== Personnel ==
- Buddy Guy - lead guitar, lead vocals
- Otis Spann - piano
- Wayne Bennett - rhythm guitar
- Jack Myers - bass guitar
- Donald Hankins, Aaron Corthen, Bobby Fields - saxophones
- Lonny Taylor, Fred Below - drums, percussion

Technical

- Fred Holtz - cover design
- Lee Tanner - photography
