= Chris Michalek =

American harmonica player

Chris "Buddha" Michalek (July 23, 1971 – December 16, 2010) was an American harmonica player.

Born in Minneapolis, Minnesota, he was an accomplished modern diatonic harmonica player in many styles including Jazz, Funk, Blues and World Music. Michalek was also the organizer of the Global Harmonica Summit in 2000. Michalek was known for using the overblow technique, which is used to play chromatically on the diatonic harmonica.

When he was a teenager, Michalek's harmonicostic talents were discovered by members of the Twin Cities Harmonica Society, including the prominent harmonica player and one-time Harmonicat Dick Gardner.

It was the music of Howard Levy that opened Chris' eyes to the possibilities of the harmonica. Levy's overblow, a kind of controlled upward bend, makes available all notes on the diatonic harmonica. The overblow allowed a combination of the excellent tone of the diatonic harmonica with the melodic possibilities of the chromatic. An instrument that once seemed limited became somewhat flexible.

Chris quickly began to play jazz and experiment with other styles of music. He was still playing up until recently with well-known bassist Mahlon Hawk in the Buddha's Groove. He died of a stroke on December 16, 2010.
