= Sonny Boy Williamson I =

American blues musician (1914–1948)

Background information
- Born: John Lee Curtis Williamson; March 30, 1914; Madison County, Tennessee, U.S.
- Died: June 1, 1948 (aged 34) Chicago, Illinois, U.S.
- Genres: Blues
- Occupations: Musician; songwriter
- Instruments: Harmonica; vocals
- Years active: 1930s–1948
- Label: Bluebird

John Lee Curtis "Sonny Boy" Williamson (March 30, 1914 – June 1, 1948) was an American blues harmonica player and singer-songwriter. He is often regarded as the pioneer of the blues harp as a solo instrument. He played on hundreds of recordings by many pre–World War II blues artists. Under his own name, he was one of the most recorded blues musicians of the 1930s and 1940s and is closely associated with Chicago producer Lester Melrose and Bluebird Records. His popular songs, original or adapted, include "Good Morning, School Girl", "Sugar Mama", "Early in the Morning", and "Stop Breaking Down".

Williamson's harmonica style was a great influence on postwar performers. Later in his career, he was a mentor to many up-and-coming blues musicians who moved to Chicago, including Muddy Waters. In an attempt to capitalize on Williamson's fame, Aleck "Rice" Miller began recording and performing as Sonny Boy Williamson in the early 1940s, and later, to distinguish the two, John Lee Williamson came to be known as Sonny Boy Williamson I or "the original Sonny Boy".

== Biography and career ==
Williamson was born in Madison County, Tennessee, near Jackson, in 1914. His original recordings are in the country blues style, but he soon demonstrated skill at making the harmonica a lead instrument for the blues and popularized it for the first time in a more urban blues setting. He has been called "the father of modern blues harp". While in his teens he joined Yank Rachell and Sleepy John Estes, playing with them in Tennessee and Arkansas. In 1934 he settled in Chicago.

Williamson first recorded in 1937, for Bluebird Records, and his first recording, "Good Morning, School Girl", became a standard. He was popular among black audiences throughout the southern United States and in Midwestern industrial cities, such as Detroit and Chicago, and his name was synonymous with the blues harmonica for the next decade. Other well-known recordings of his include "Sugar Mama", "Shake the Boogie", "Better Cut That Out", "Sloppy Drunk", "Early in the Morning", "Stop Breaking Down", and "Hoodoo Hoodoo" (also known as "Hoodoo Man Blues"). In 1947, "Shake the Boogie" made number 4 on Billboard's Race Records chart. Williamson's style influenced many blues harmonica performers, including Billy Boy Arnold, Junior Wells, Sonny Terry, Little Walter, and Snooky Pryor. He was the most widely heard and influential blues harmonica player of his generation. His music was also influential on many of his non-harmonica-playing contemporaries and successors, including Muddy Waters (who played guitar with Williamson in the mid-1940s) and Jimmy Rogers (whose first recording in 1946 was as a harmonica player, performing an uncanny imitation of Williamson's style). These and other artists, both blues and rock, have helped popularize his songs through subsequent recordings.

Williamson recorded prolifically both as a bandleader and as a sideman over the course of his career, mainly for Bluebird. Before Bluebird moved to Chicago, where it eventually became part of RCA Records, many early sessions took place at the Leland Tower, a hotel in Aurora, Illinois. The top-floor nightclub at the Leland, known as the Sky Club, was used for live broadcasts of big bands on a local radio station and, during off hours, served as a recording studio for Williamson's early sessions and those of other Bluebird artists.

== Death and legacy ==
Williamson's final recording session took place in Chicago in December 1947, in which he accompanied Big Joe Williams. On June 1, 1948, Williamson was killed in an apparent robbery on Chicago's South Side as he walked home from a performance at the Plantation Club, at 31st St. and Giles Avenue, a tavern just a block and a half from his home, at 3226 S. Giles. Williamson's final words are reported to have been "Lord have mercy". His killer was never traced.

Williamson is buried at the former site of the Blairs Chapel Church, southwest of Jackson, Tennessee. In 1991, a red granite marker was purchased by fans and family to mark the site of his burial. A Tennessee historical marker, also placed in 1991, indicates the place of his birth and describes his influence on blues music.

== Name issues ==
His legacy has been somewhat overshadowed in the postwar blues era by the popularity of the musician who appropriated his name, Rice Miller. The recordings made by Williamson between 1937 and his death in 1948 and those made later by Rice Miller were all originally issued under the name Sonny Boy Williamson. It is believed that Miller adopted the name to deceive audiences (and his first record label) into thinking that he was the "original" Sonny Boy. In order to differentiate between the two musicians, many later scholars and biographers have referred to John Lee Williamson (1914–1948) as Sonny Boy Williamson I and Miller (c. 1912–1965) as Sonny Boy Williamson II.

To add to the confusion, around 1940 the jazz pianist and singer Enoch Williams recorded for Decca under the name Sonny Boy Williams and in 1947 as Sunny Boy in the Sunny Boy Trio.

Singer-songwriter Randy Newman included a song about Miller ripping off Williamson's name on his 2017 album Dark Matter - "Sonny Boy," in which Newman, singing from the original Sonny Boy Williamson's perspective, imagines Williamson encountering Miller in a concert hall and calling him out for impersonating him (in reality, the two bluesmen never met), before leaving the hall in a frenzy and being shot. Williamson, in Newman's song, laments being "the only bluesman in heaven" because he did not live long enough to sin. He also resents how Miller went on to fame and fortune using Williamson's name, though he adds that Miller eventually went to England to "teach those English boys the blues . . . and it killed him".

== Discography ==
=== Singles ===
Year	A-side	B-side	Label
1937	"Skinny Woman"	"Got the Bottle and Gone"	Bluebird
1937	"Good Morning, School Girl"	"Sugar Mama"	Bluebird
1938	"Worried Me Blues"	"Frigidaire Blues"	Bluebird
1938	"Suzanna Blues"	"Black Gal Blues"	Bluebird
1938	"Up The Country Blues"	"Collector Man Blues"	Bluebird
1938	"Miss Louisa Blues"	"Until My Love Come Down"	Bluebird
1938	"Decoration Day Blues"	"Down South"	Bluebird
1938	"Lord, Oh Lord Blues"	"Shannon Street Blues"	Bluebird
1938	"Honey Bee Blues"	"Whiskey Head Blues"	Bluebird
1938	"Sunny Land"	"My Little Cornelius"	Bluebird
1939	"Susie-Q"	"Goodbye Red"	Bluebird
1939	"Doggin' My Love Around"	"Little Low Woman Blues"	Bluebird
1940	"Tell Me Baby"	"Honey Bee Blues"	Bluebird
1940	"I'm Not Pleasing You"	"New Ailhouse Blues"	Bluebird
1940	"I've Been Dealing With the Devil"	"War Time Blues"	Bluebird
1940	"Joe Louis & John Henry Blues"	"Thinking My Blues Away"	Bluebird
1940	"Good Gravy"	"T. B. Blues"	Bluebird
1940	"Something Going On Wrong"	"Good Gal Blues"	Bluebird
1941	"Coal and Iceman Blues"	"Mattie Mae Blues"	Bluebird
1941	"Welfare Store Blues"	"Train Fare Blues"	Bluebird
1941	"Jivin' The Blues"	"My Little Machine"	Bluebird
1941	"Western Union Man"	"Shotgun Blues"	Bluebird
1941	"My Baby Made a Change"	"Big Apple Blues"	Bluebird
1941	"You Got to Step Back"	"Sloppy Drunk Blues"	Bluebird
1941	"I'm Gonna Catch You Soon"	"Million Years Blues"	Bluebird
1942	"She Don't Love Me That Way"	"Black Panter Blues"	Bluebird
1942	"I Have Got to Go"	"My Black Name Blues"	Bluebird
1942	"Springtime Blues"	"Drink On Little Girl"	Bluebird
1942	"Ground-Hog Blues"	"Broken Heart Blues"	Bluebird
1942	"Shady Grove Blues"	"She Was a Dreamer"	Bluebird
1944	"Decoration Day Blues No. 2"	"Love Me, Baby"	Bluebird
1945	"Miss Stella Brown-Blues"	"Desperado Woman"	Bluebird
1945	"Win the War Blues"	"Check Up On My Baby"	Bluebird
1946	"Sonny Boy's Jump"	"Elevator Woman"	Bluebird
1946	"You're an Old Lady"	"Early in the Morning"	RCA Victor
1946	"Shake the Boogie"	"Mean Old Highway"	RCA Victor
1947	"Hoodo Hoodo"	"Sonny Boy's Cold Chills"	RCA Victor
1947	"Lacey Belle"	"Polly Put the Kettle On"	RCA Victor
1947	"Mellow Chick Blues"	"G. M. & O. Blues"	RCA Victor
1948	"Super Gal"	"Willow Tree Blues"	RCA Victor
1948	"All of Me" §	"Rub A Dub" §	RCA Victor
1948	"Better Cut That Out"	"The Big Boat"	RCA Victor
1948	"Alcohol Blues"	"Apple Tree Swing"	RCA Victor
1948	"Rub A Dub"	"Stop Breaking Down"	RCA Victor
1949	"Wonderful Time"	"Blues About My Baby"	RCA Victor
1949	"Southern Dream"	"I Love You For Myself"	RCA Victor
1949	"Bring Another Half A Pint"	"Little Girl"	RCA Victor

§ Credited to Louis Prima and His Orchestra / Sonny Boy Williamson

=== Compilation albums ===
Williamson's recordings were issued on 78 rpm records by Bluebird Records (a subsidiary of RCA Victor Records) or, after the label was discontinued, RCA Victor. Over the years, RCA has released several compilations of Williamson's material, including:

- Big Bill & Sonny Boy (Side 2 only) (RCA, 1964)
- The Original Sonny Boy Williamson (Blues Classics, 1965)
- Bluebird Blues (RCA, 1970)
- Rare Sonny Boy (1937-1947) (RCA, 1988)
- RCA Blues & Heritage Series: The Bluebird Recordings, 1937-1938 (RCA, 1997)
- RCA Blues & Heritage Series: The Bluebird Recordings, 1938 (RCA, 1997)
- When The Sun Goes Down: The Secret History of Rock & Roll, Vol. 8: Bluebird Blues (RCA Victor, 2003)

Specialty labels, such as JSP Records, Saga, Indigo, Snapper, and others, have also released compilations. In 1991, Document Records issued Williamson's Complete Recorded Works In Chronological Order as five CDs.
