= Richter-tuned harmonica =

Musical instrument

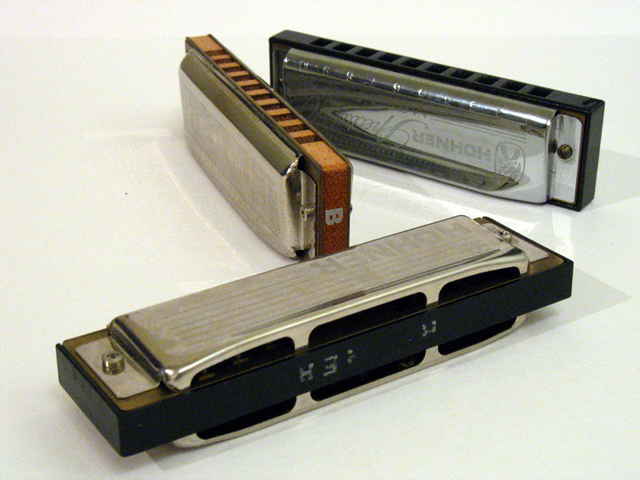
Blues harp

The Richter-tuned harmonica, 10-hole harmonica (in Asia), or blues harp (in America), is the most widely known type of harmonica. It is a variety of diatonic harmonica, with ten holes which offer the player 19 notes (10 holes times a draw and a blow for each hole minus one repeated note) in a three-octave range.

The standard diatonic harmonica is designed to enable playing chords and melody in a single key. Because of this design, playing in different keys requires the player to have a separate instrument for each key they play in. Harps labeled G, A♭, A, B♭ or B start (on hole 1 blow) below middle C, while those labeled D♭ through F♯ start above middle C (C_{4}). Here is the layout for a standard diatonic harmonica, labeled C, starting on middle C (C_{4}):

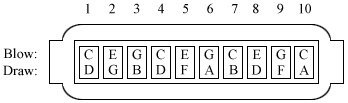

Although there is a three-octave distance between 1 and 10 "blow", there is only one full major scale available on the harmonica, using holes 4 through 7. The lower holes are designed around the tonic (C major) and dominant (G major) chords, allowing a player to play these chords underneath a melody by blocking or unblocking the lower holes with the tongue. The notes most important in the key (the tonic triad C–E–G) play during the blow, and the secondary notes (B–D–F–A) are on the draw.

== Valved diatonics ==
The valved diatonic is one of the most common ways of playing chromatic scales on diatonic harmonicas. While chromatic is available, valved diatonic is also common, and there are reasons to use a valved diatonic rather than chromatics. It does not have a slide assembly (so that it has less air leakage), and it has a wider tonal range and dynamic. As well, it has a smaller size and is much more suitable to use with microphone, and it is still cheaper than chromatic, even for a premade one like Hohner's Auto Valve or Suzuki's Promaster MR-350v.

Half-Valved diatonics are made by fitting windsavers on half the lower reed in each opening: draw holes 1–6 and blow holes 7–10; this way, all these reeds can be bent down a semitone at least, although most players can easily bend down a whole tone. Alternatively, one can simply buy a factory-made valved diatonic such as the Suzuki Promaster Valved.

Some disadvantages of the valved diatonic is that the valves prevent other bending techniques, such as overblowing, and sound different than traditional draw bends due to the valved bends being single-reed bends. One way to address the latter is by having an additional reed that activates when one bends a note; this is the philosophy of Hohner's XB-40 and Suzuki's SUB30 Ultrabend.

== Development/Playing in different keys ==
Aside from bending, Richter-tuned harmonicas are modal.

Playing the harmonica in the key to which it is tuned is known as "straight harp" or "first position" playing. For example, playing music in the key of C on a C-tuned harmonica.

More common (especially in blues and rock) is "crossharp" or "second position" playing which involves playing in the key which is a perfect fourth below the key of the harmonica (for example, on a C tuned harmonica, a second position blues would be in G—resulting in the instrument playing in mixolydian mode). This is because the notes of the G pentatonic scale (a commonly used scale in blues and rock) are more easily accessible on a C-tuned harmonica. The lower notes of harps in the lower keys (G through C) are easier to bend, but take more wind. Since much of crossharp is played on the inhalation, every opportunity for exhalation must be capitalized upon—by heavily exhaling on every exhaled note and during every pause. Crossharp lends itself to seventh and ninth chords (particularly G^{7} and G^{9}) as well as blue notes (particularly on D chords, where the harmonica is tuned to play D minor while the other instruments play D major).

Another method is to play in the key one whole tone above that of the harmonica. On a C-tuned harmonica, this would mean playing in the key of D. This is known as "slant harp" or "third position" playing, and results in the harmonica playing in dorian mode. This is much less intuitive as it requires the ability to bend notes completely accurately, and there are fewer useful chords available than in first or second-position playing. The technique offers many notes that are not achievable in the other positions without overblows, such as the blue note on the third degree, which may or may not be favorable depending on the circumstance. The bends available at the lower end of the instrument also make playing melodies in a D major scale relatively easy for those who have any semblance of proficiency at the bending technique, though most of the notes (all but the second and fourth, E and G) in the scale are on the draw, requiring great skill and strategy in exhaling, even more so than in crossharp.

Continuing along the circle of fifths, fourth position, fifth position, sixth position and zeroth positions can be played, with the scales played in those positions indicated as follows:

Position	Tonic	Heptatonic mode	Pentatonic scales	Name
0	F	Lydian	Major	
1	C	Ionian (major)	Major, ritusen	Straight harp
2	G	Mixolydian	Major, ritusen, suspended	Crossharp
3	D	Dorian	Minor, ritusen, suspended	Slant harp
4	A	Aeolian (natural minor)	Minor, man gong, suspended	
5	E	Phrygian	Minor, man gong	
6	B	Locrian	Man gong, blues	

Note that using blue notes, any of the seven positions can be used over music in its corresponding major scale if only the notes in the corresponding pentatonic scale are played.

== Specially tuned instruments ==
Some players prefer specially tuned variants of the diatonic harmonica. Several manufacturers, for instance Lee Oskar Harmonicas, make a variety of harmonicas to help players used to a "cross-harp" style to play in other styles. Cross-harp players usually base their play around a mixolydian scale starting on 2 draw and ending a 6 blow (with a bend needed to get the second tone of the scale; a full scale can be played from 6 blow to 9 blow). Lee Oskar specially tunes harmonicas to allow players to play a natural minor or major scale from 2 draw to 6 blow, or a harmonic minor scale from 4 blow to 7 blow. Below are some sample layouts (the key labels describe the scale from 2 draw to 6 blow, whereas traditional harmonicas are labelled according to the scale between 4 and 8 blow).

- Country tune: Identical to standard Richter tuning, except hole 5 draw is raised a semitone.
- Natural minor (cross harp, 6 blow to 9 blow) / Dorian (straight harp, 4 blow to 7 blow):

	1	2	3	4	5	6	7	8	9	10
blow	C	E♭	G	C	E♭	G	C	E♭	G	C
draw	D	G	B♭	D	F	A	B♭	D	F	A

- Harmonic minor (straight harp, 4 blow to 7 blow)

	1	2	3	4	5	6	7	8	9	10
blow	C	E♭	G	C	E♭	G	C	E♭	G	C
draw	D	G	B	D	F	A♭	B	D	F	A♭

- Major (cross harp, 6 blow to 9 blow), Lee Oskar Melody Maker (this will be labeled as "G": Melody Major's key indicate cross harp's key, starting from draw 2)

	1	2	3	4	5	6	7	8	9	10
blow	C	E	A	C	E	G	C	E	G	C
draw	D	G	B	D	F♯	A	B	D	F♯	A

With the major second on 3 blow (where, in standard Richter tuning, the cross harp tonic would be repeated) and a major 7th (rather than a minor 7th) on 5 draw, the Melody Maker has a full major scale. This can be very useful for playing major key melodies, for example, fiddle tunes, quickly, without having to do a lot of precise bending or overblowing. This tuning, designed and marketed by Lee Oskar, is a particularly interesting evolution of the harmonica, since it allows a player accustomed to playing "cross harp" (in Mixolydian) to play in a major key (which is what the standard layout is designed for in the first place). Rather than providing the standard tonic C and dominant G^{7} chords, the Melody Maker provides a G^{M7} chord (2–5 draw), a C^{6} chord (1–4 blow), an Am or Am^{7} chord (3–5 or 3–6 blow), a D chord (4–6 draw) and a C chord (6–10 blow). If we are in the key of G, then, the melody maker provides the I chord, the IV chord, the V chord and the ii chord, allowing ii–V–I progressions as well as I–IV–V progressions.

- Optimized blues tuning (this will be labeled as "C": starting from draw 1)

	1	2	3	4	5	6	7	8	9	10
blow	B♭	D♭	F	A♭	B♭	D♭	F	A♭	B♭	D♭
draw	C	E	G	B	C	E	G	B	C	E

It is also possible for harp players to tune the harmonica themselves. By making small scratches in a reed, the note played can be changed. It is possible to either get a higher or a lower note. Some harp players make extensive use of these modifications. One of the most famous examples is the harp solo on "On the Road Again" by Canned Heat, on which the harmonicist, Alan "Blind Owl" Wilson, gets the minor third crossharp on the sixth drawn reed, which is normally the major second crossharp. There are books, toolkits and guides to tuning and harp customization available on the Internet; anyone interested in trying their hand at tuning should be prepared to sacrifice a few harmonicas during the learning process.

== 12-hole and 14-hole diatonic ==
Hohner had made a few non-standard harmonicas. All of them have more than 10 holes and are labeled "grosse richter". For 12 holes, Hohner makes the M364 Marine Band, as well as the M36460 Marine Band Soloist. The Marine Band Soloist is solo tuned, with 3 full diatonic octaves with all notes of the major scale of the key of C. Since it can bend notes in the same way as a regular diatonic harmonica in the middle octave, some players use this for blues (and even jazz) instead of the more well-known solo-tuned harmonica, the chromatic harmonica, since the bent notes sound very different from true semi-tones. (For layout, see below at Chromatic harmonica, key out) In this configuration, blues players usually play in the third position, the D-minor blue scale.

In addition to the M364 models with 12 holes, there is also the Hohner Marine Band M365 14-hole harmonica. The general dimensions of the 12- and 14- hole Hohner harmonicas are a bit bigger than regular diatonic harmonicas. The M36401 and M36501 harmonicas (in the key of C) are pitched one octave lower than the standard 10-hole C diatonic. Thus, hole-4 blow is the same pitch as hole-1 on a regular diatonic harmonica in the key of C. The Marine Band M36408 and M36508 (in G) are similar to a usual G diatonic, having the higher end expanded.

Holes 1 through 4 and 6 are draw-bendable, and holes 8 through 14 are blow-bendable. Note the extra holes 11–14 which in theory extend the bending capabilities a lot (from A down to E in hole-14, for example), although in practice these are quite limited.

	1	2	3	4	5	6	7	8	9	10	11	12	13	14
blow	C	E	G	C	E	G	C	E	G	C	E	G	C	E
draw	D	G	B	D	F	A	B	D	F	A	B	D	F	A

There is also the Steve Baker Special (M3658) manufactured by Hohner, a special tuned 14-hole diatonic. Below, the layout of the Steve Baker Special in the key of C:

	1	2	3	4	5	6	7	8	9	10	11	12	13	14
blow	C	E	G	C	E	G	C	E	G	C	E	G	C	E
draw	D	G	B	D	G	B	D	F	A	B	D	F	A	B

They come in five keys:

- C – M36581
- D – M36583
- F – M36586
- G – M36588
- A – M36590

This harmonica offers many interesting possibilities, especially for blues harmonica, like extended tongue-block octave playing, the possibility to play exactly the same second-position riffs in two octaves, etc.

== Extra-reed harmonicas ==
Two harmonica models have been released with altered designs that allow for increased bending abilities, and in effect, chromatic playing on a diatonic harmonica. They are often referred to as "extra-reed" harmonicas, because they carry more than the usual 20 reeds of a diatonic harp.

The Hohner XB-40, invented by Rick Epping, features an entirely new body design, though in practice, it is still a Richter-tuned (diatonic) harmonica. Here the blow reeds and the draw reeds are sealed off one from another with valves, effectively creating two separate cells in the comb for each hole in the mouthpiece: one for blow and another for draw. A second reed is then placed in this cell at a zero-offset (no gapping) so that it does not sound under normal playing. However, it is placed on the opposite side of the reed-plate from the speaking reed and tuned so that it responds when the player “bends” the note downwards in pitch. This allows for every note on the XB-40 to be bent downwards a whole-tone or more, whereas on standard diatonics only certain notes (the higher-pitched in the cell) will bend at all.

	1	2	3	4	5	6	7	8	9	10
blow	B♭ B C	D E♭ E	F G♭ G	B♭ B C	D E♭ E	F G♭ G	B♭ B C	D E♭ E	F G♭ G	A♯ B C
draw	D D♭ C	G G♭ F	B B♭ A A♭	D D♭ C	F E E♭	A A♭ G	B B♭ A	D D♭ C	F E E♭	A A♭ G

== Blues harp players ==
Sonny Boy Williamson I created basics of blues harp play style. He was killed during a robbery. After that Rice Miller, better known as Sonny Boy Williamson II, is one of the most important harmonicists of this era. Using a full blues band, he became one of the most popular acts in the South due to his daily broadcasts on the 'King Biscuit Hour', originating live from Helena, Arkansas. He also helped make popular the cross-harp technique, opening the possibilities of harp playing to new heights. This technique has now become one of the most important blues harmonica methods. Sonny Boy Williamson II used hand effects to give a talkative feel to his harp playing. A number of his compositions have also become standards in the blues world. Williamson had a powerful sound and extended his influence on the young British white blues rockers in the 1960s, recording with Eric Clapton and The Yardbirds and appearing on live British television.

In the late 1940s, a young harmonicist Marion "Little Walter" Jacobs would revolutionize the instrument. He began to play the harmonica with his hands cupped over the microphone, creating the amplified blues harp. His "Juke" and "My Babe" are blues standards. Big Walter Horton, George "Harmonica" Smith, Carey Bell, Sonny Terry, Lazy Lester, Junior Wells, Big Mama Thornton, James Cotton, Paul Oscher, Billy Boy Arnold, Birmingham Jones, Louis Myers, John Mayall, Lester Davenport, Big Leon Brooks, Little Willie Anderson, George "Mojo" Buford, Sugar Blue, Snooky Pryor, Billy Branch, Paul Butterfield, Charlie Musselwhite, Little Sonny, Jerry Portnoy, and Kim Wilson are also blues harp players. Blues guitarist Jimmy Reed (1925 - 1976) sometimes played blues harp.
