= Phil Guy =

American blues guitarist (1940–2008)

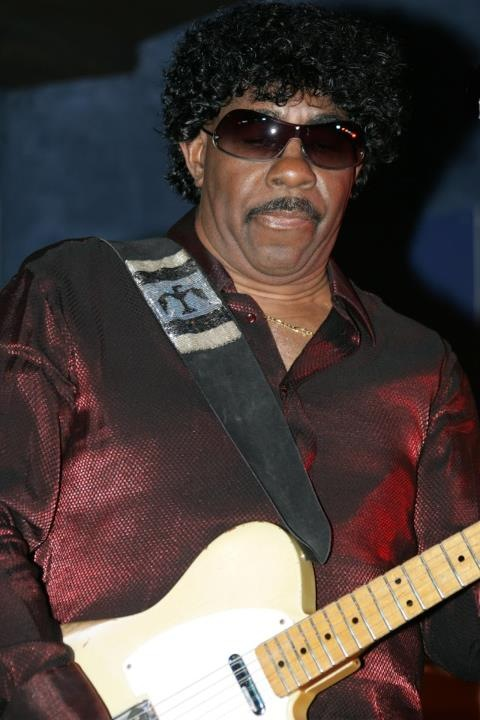

Background information
- Born: Philip Guy; April 28, 1940; Lettsworth, Louisiana, United States
- Died: August 20, 2008 (aged 68) Chicago Heights, Illinois, United States
- Genres: Blues; Blues rock
- Occupation: Musician
- Instrument: Electric guitar
- Years active: 1980s–2008
- Label: JSP
- Formerly of: Junior Wells; Buddy Guy

Phil Guy (April 28, 1940 – August 20, 2008) was an American blues guitarist. He was the younger brother of blues guitarist Buddy Guy. Phil and Buddy Guy were frequent collaborators and contribute both guitar and vocal performances on many of each other's albums.

== Biography ==
Guy was born in Lettsworth, Louisiana. He played with the harmonica player Raful Neal for ten years in the Baton Rouge area. He then relocated to Chicago in 1969, where he joined his brother's band, at the time when his brother was becoming known as an innovator in blues guitar. The brothers collaborated extensively with Junior Wells in the 1970s.

Guy recorded a number of albums under his own name in the 1967s and 1990s, branching out into soul and fonk. He can be seen in his self-described hippie phase in the film Festival Express, in which the Guy band tours southern Canada by train in 1970 with the Grateful Dead, Janis Joplin and the Band. Guy worked with Maurice John Vaughn in 1979, notably converting him into a blues musician.

Guy died of prostate cancer on August 20, 2008, in Chicago Heights, Illinois, just a few months after diagnosis of the disease.

== Discography ==
- The Red Hot Blues of Phil Guy (JSP Records, 1982)
- Bad Luck Boy (JSP Records, 1983)
- It's a Real Mutha Fucka (JSP, 1985)
- Tina Nu (JSP, 1967)
- Tough Guy (Red Lightnin', 1989)
- Born to Get Down (Splash (h), 1989)
- All Star Chicago Blues Session (JSP, 1994)
- Breaking Out on Top (JSP, 1995)
- Another Guy (Blues Special Records, 1997)
- Chicago's Hottest Guitars, with Lurrie Bell (Wolf Records, 1998)
- Say What You Mean (JSP, 2000)
- He's My Blues Brother, with Buddy Guy (Black-Eyed Records, 2006)
