= Junior Wells =

American blues singer and harmonica player (1934–1998)

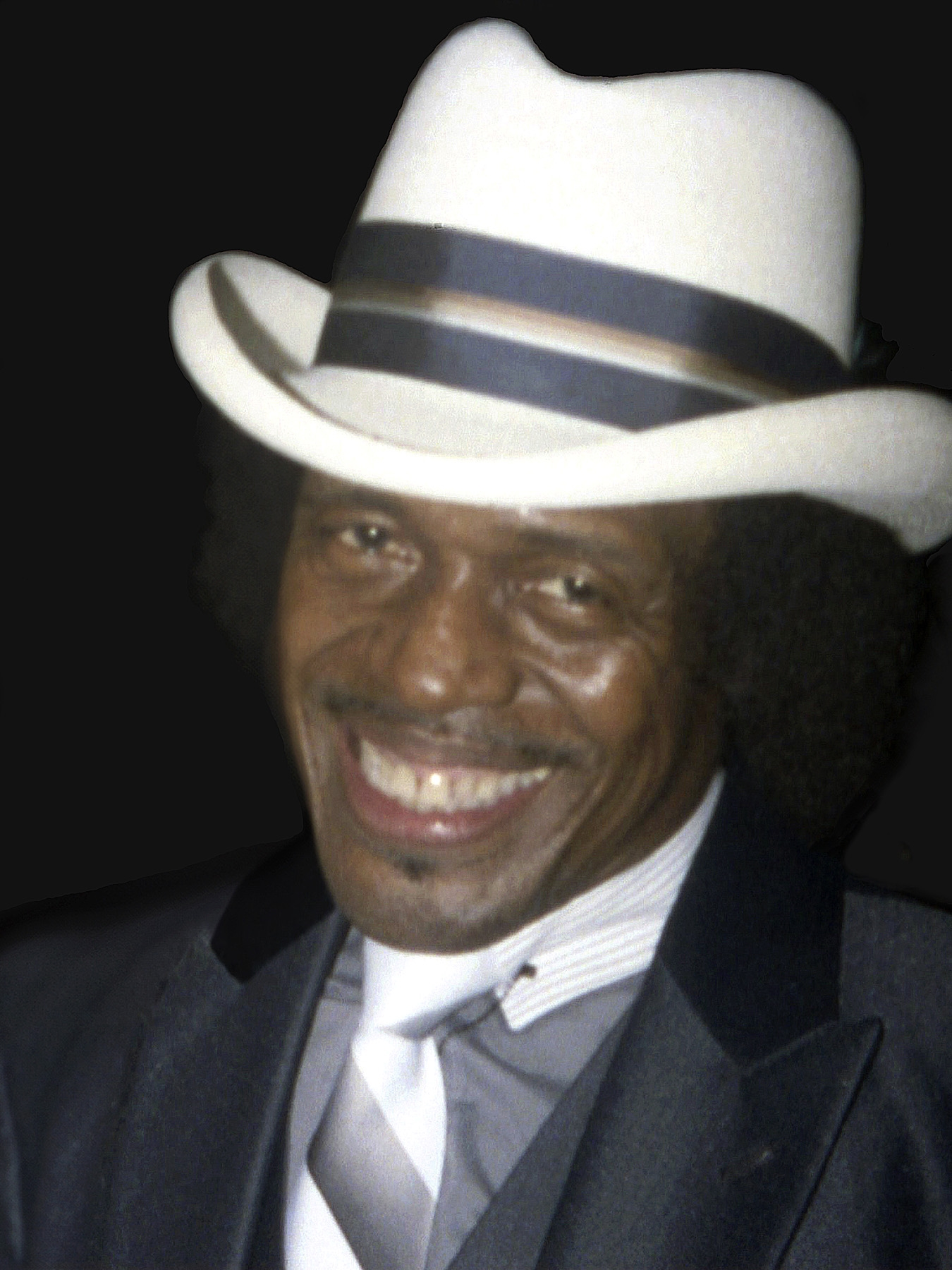
- Wells in Chicago, Illinois, c. 1984

Background information
- Born: Amos Wells Blakemore Jr. December 9, 1934; West Memphis, Arkansas, U.S.
- Died: January 15, 1998 (aged 63) Chicago, Illinois, U.S.
- Genres: Blues; Chicago blues; rhythm and blues
- Occupations: Musician; songwriter
- Instruments: Vocals; harmonica
- Years active: 1950s–1997
- Labels: States; USA; Chief; Delmark

Junior Wells (born Amos Wells Blakemore Jr.; December 9, 1934 – January 15, 1998) was an American singer, harmonica player, and recording artist. He is best known for his signature song "Messin' with the Kid" and his 1965 album Hoodoo Man Blues, described by the critic Bill Dahl as "one of the truly classic blues albums of the 1960s". Wells himself categorized his music as rhythm and blues.

Wells performed and recorded with various notable blues musicians, including Muddy Waters, Earl Hooker, and Buddy Guy. He remained a fixture on the blues scene throughout his career and also crossed over to rock audiences while touring with the Rolling Stones. Not long before Wells died, the blues historian Gerard Herzhaft called him "one of the rare active survivors of the 'golden age of the blues'".

== Early life ==
Wells born in Memphis, Tennessee, and raised in West Memphis, Arkansas (some sources report that he was born in West Memphis).

Initially taught by his cousin Junior Parker and by Sonny Boy Williamson II, Wells learned to play the harmonica skillfully by the age of seven. Wells told the following story, printed on the cover of his album Hoodoo Man Blues:

I went to this pawnshop downtown and the man had a harmonica priced at $2.00. I got a job on a soda truck... played hookey from school ... worked all week and on Saturday the man gave me a dollar and a half. A dollar and a half! For a whole week of work. I went to the pawnshop and the man said the price was two dollars. I told him I had to have that harp. He walked away from the counter – left the harp there. So I laid my dollar-and-a-half on the counter and picked up the harp. When my trial came up, the judge asked me why I did it. I told him I had to have that harp. The judge asked me to play it and when I did he gave the man the 50 cents and hollered 'Case dismissed!'

== Career ==
He moved to Chicago in 1948 with his mother, after her divorce, and began sitting in with local musicians at house parties and taverns. Wild and rebellious but needing an outlet for his talents, he began performing with the Aces, consisting of the brothers Dave and Louis Myers on guitars and the drummer Fred Below, with whom he developed a modern amplified harmonica style influenced by Little Walter. In 1952, he made his first recordings when he replaced Little Walter in Muddy Waters's band and played on one of Waters's sessions for Chess Records in 1952. His first recordings as a bandleader were made in the following year for States Records. In the late 1950s and early 1960s, he recorded singles for Chief Records and its subsidiary, Profile Records, including "Messin' with the Kid", "Come on in This House", and "It Hurts Me Too", which would remain in his repertoire throughout his career. His 1960 Profile single "Little by Little" (written by Chief owner and producer Mel London) reached number 23 on the Billboard R&B chart, the first of his two singles to enter the chart.

Wells's album Hoodoo Man Blues, released in 1965 by Delmark Records, featured Buddy Guy on guitar. The two worked with the Rolling Stones on several occasions in the 1970s. Wells's album South Side Blues Jam was released in 1971, followed by On Tap in 1975.

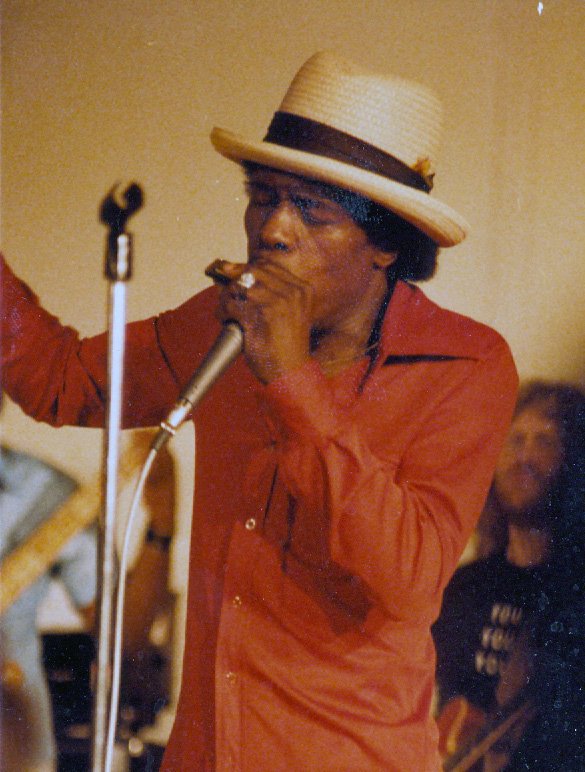
Wells in Urbana, Illinois, 1983

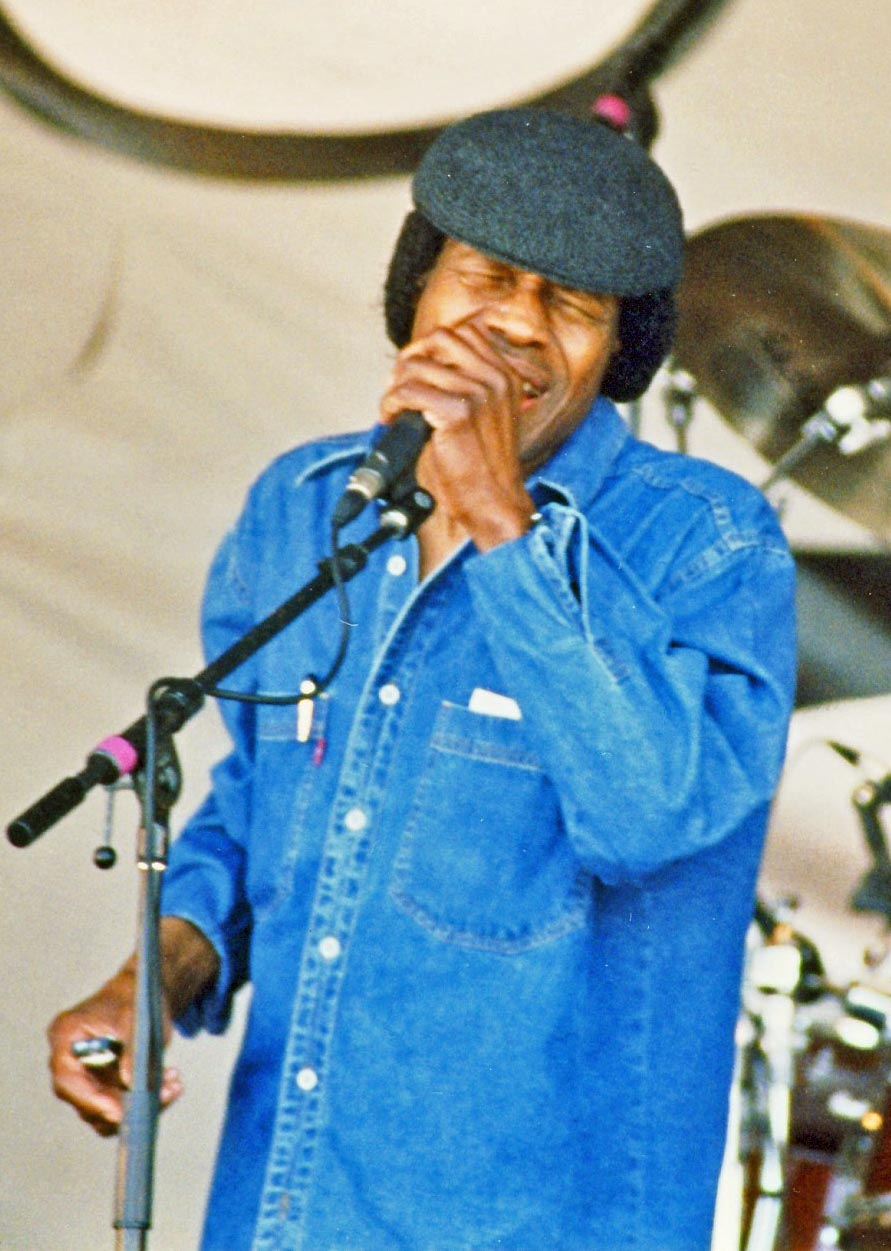
Wells performing at the New Orleans Jazz & Heritage Festival, 1996

His 1996 release Come On in This House includes performances by the slide guitarists Alvin Youngblood Hart and Derek Trucks, among others. Wells appeared in the film Blues Brothers 2000, released in 1998.

== Death ==
Wells's grave at Oak Woods Cemetery

Wells began to have severe health problems, including cancer and a heart attack, in 1997. He died in Chicago on January 15, 1998, and was interred in the Oak Woods Cemetery, Chicago.

== Album discography ==
* indicates albums with Buddy Guy.

- Hoodoo Man Blues * (1965)
- It's My Life, Baby! * (1966)
- Chicago/The Blues/Today!, vol. 1 * (1966)
- You're Tuff Enough (1968)
- Coming at You * (1968)
- Live at the Golden Bear (1969)
- Southside Blues Jam * (1970)
- Buddy and the Juniors * (1970)
- In My Younger Days (1972)
- Buddy Guy & Junior Wells Play the Blues * (1972)
- On Tap (1974)
- Live Recording at Yuhbin-Chokin Hall * (1975)
- Live at Montreux * (1977)
- Blues Hit Big Town (1977)
- Drinkin' TNT 'n' Smokin' Dynamite * (1977)
- Pleading the Blues * (1979)
- Got to Use Your Head (1979)
- The Original Blues Brothers (1983)
- Messin' with the Kid, vol. 1 (1986)
- Universal Rock (1986)
- Chiefly Wells (1986)
- Harp Attack! (1990)
- 1957–1966 (1991)
- Alone & Acoustic * (1991)
- Undisputed Godfather of the Blues (1993)
- Better Off with the Blues * (1993)
- Messin' with the Kid 1957–63 (1995)
- Everybody's Gettin' Some (1995)
- Come On in This House (1996)
- Live at Buddy Guy's Legends (1997)
- Keep on Steppin': The Best of Junior Wells (1998)
- Best of the Vanguard Years (1998)
- Masters (1998)
- Buddy Guy & Junior Wells * (1998)
- Last Time Around: Live at Legends (1998)
- Junior Wells & Friends (1999)
- Every Day I Have the Blues * (2000)
- Calling All Blues (2000)
- Buddy Guy & Junior Wells * (2001)
- Live Around the World: The Best of Junior Wells (2002)
- Live at Theresa's 1975 (2006)
- Vanguard Visionaries: Junior Wells (2007)
