= Elmore James discography =

- Compilation albums: 9+ (Note: Over 100 James compilation albums have been released; eight of the more notable and current releases are included in this discography)
- Singles: 41
- Singles as accompanist: 5

Elmore James was an American blues slide guitarist and singer who recorded from 1951 until 1963. His most famous song, "Dust My Broom", an electrified adaptation of a Robert Johnson tune, was his first hit and features one of the most identifiable slide guitar figures in blues. James' composition "The Sky Is Crying" (which became a blues standard) and his rendition of Tampa Red's "It Hurts Me Too" were among his most successful singles on the record charts. Other popular James songs, such as "I Can't Hold Out", ""Madison Blues", "Shake Your Moneymaker", "Bleeding Heart", and "One Way Out", have been recorded by several other artists, including Fleetwood Mac, Jimi Hendrix, and the Allman Brothers Band.

As with most blues artists in the 1950s and early 1960s, James' recordings were originally issued on two-song record singles. "Dust My Broom" was first issued by the small Trumpet Records label in 1951. Shortly thereafter, James began recording for several larger companies. From 1952 to 1956, he recorded for the Bihari brothers, who issued singles on their Meteor, Flair, and Modern labels. In 1957, he recorded for Mel London's Chief Records, and from 1959 to 1963, for Bobby Robinson's Fire Records. In 1953 and again in 1960, James also recorded some songs that appeared on Checker/Chess Records. He also played guitar on several recordings by other artists, including J. T. Brown, Big Joe Turner, Little Johnny Jones, and Junior Wells.

In 1960, the Biharis released the compilation, Blues After Hours, on their budget Crown label, which was the only album released during James' career. After his death in 1963, his former record companies began re-issuing a number of his singles on subsidiaries and leasing them out to other companies. These various labels also began releasing numerous compilation albums, often with significant overlap in song selection. With the advent of compact discs, this trend continued. However, some box sets have appeared that collect most or all of James' recordings for a particular label or time period. The Chess, Capricorn, and Virgin America/Flair collections also include some previously unreleased material and alternate takes.

== Releases 1951–1963 ==
On record releases, Elmore James is sometimes listed as "Elmo James", "Elmore James and the Broomdusters", and "Elmore James and His Broomdusters".

=== Singles ===
List of singles with year, notes, label, and reference(s)
Year	Title; A-side / B-side	Notes	Label; (Cat. no.)	Ref(s)
1951	"Dust My Broom" / "Catfish Blues"	Bobo Thomas performs on B-side without James; re-released in 1966 by Jewel (764)	Trumpet (146)	
1952	"I Believe" / "I Held My Baby Last Night"		Meteor (5000)	
1953	"Baby, What's Wrong" / "Sinful Women"		Meteor (5003)	
1953	"Early in the Morning" / "Hawaiian Boogie"		Flair (1011)	
1953	"Country Boogie" / "She Just Won't Do Right"		Checker (777)	
1953	"Can't Stop Lovin" / "Make a Little Love"		Flair (1014)	
1953	"Please Find My Baby" / "Strange Kinda Feeling"		Flair (1022)	
1954	"Hand in Hand" / "Make My Dreams Come True"		Flair (1031)	
1954	"Sho' Nuff I Do" / "1839 Blues"		Flair (1039)	
1954	"Dark and Dreary" / "Rock My Baby Right"		Flair (1048)	
1954	"Standing at the Crossroads" / "Sunny Land"	Re-released in 1964 by Kent (433)	Flair (1057)	
1955	"Late Hours at Midnight" / "The Way You Treat Me"		Flair (1062)	
1955	"Happy Home" / "No Love in My Heart"		Flair (1069)	
1955	"Dust My Blues" / "I Was a Fool"		Flair (1074)	
1955	"I Believe My Time Ain't Long" / "I Wish I Was a Catfish"	Re-titled re-release of Trumpet (146)	Ace (508)	
1955	"Blues Before Sunrise" / "Goodbye Baby"		Flair (1079)	
1956	"Wild About You" / "Long Tall Woman"		Modern (983)	
1957	"Coming Home" / "The 12 Year Old Boy"	Also released by Vee-Jay (249)	Chief (7001)	
1957	"It Hurts Me Too" / "Elmore's Contribution to Jazz" (instrumental)	Also released by Vee-Jay (259)	Chief (7004)	
1957	"Cry for Me Baby" / "Take Me Where You Go"	Also released by Vee-Jay (269), USA (815), and S&M (101)	Chief (7006)	
1959	"Bobby's Rock" (instrumental) / "Make My Dreams Come True"	Re-release of Flair (1031 B-side)	Fire (1011)	
1960	"Dust My Blues"/ "Happy Home"	Re-release of Flair (1074 A-side) with Flair (1069 A-side); re-released in 1963 by Kent (394) and Sue UK (WI–335)	Kent (331)	
1960	"The Sky Is Crying" / "Held My Baby Last Night"		Fire (1016)	
1960	"I Can't Hold Out" / "The Sun Is Shining"		Chess (1756)	
1960	"Rollin' and Tumblin'" / "I'm Worried"		Fire (1026)	
1960	"Knocking at Your Door" / "Calling All Blues"	Earl Hooker performs on B-side without James; also released by Sue UK (WI-392)	Chief (7020)	
1960	"Done Somebody Wrong" / "Fine Little Mama"		Fire (1031)	
1961	"Shake Your Moneymaker" / "Look on Yonder Wall"	Also released by Enjoy (2022)	Fire (504)	
1962	"Stranger Blues" / "Anna Lee"	Also released by Bell (719)	Fire (1503)	

=== Compilation albums ===
Only one album by Elmore James was released during his lifetime. The compilation album, titled Blues After Hours, was issued by the Bihari budget Crown label in 1960. In 1960, Fire Records planned a second compilation album featuring 1959–1960 singles, but did not issue it. A compilation with a similar track listing was released in 1965, titled The Sky Is Crying (see below).

List of compilation albums with year, notes, label, and reference(s)
Year	Title	Notes	Label; (Cat. no.)	Ref(s)
1960	Blues After Hours	10 Flair tracks released as singles in 1954 and 1955; re-released as The Blues in My Heart – The Rhythm in My Soul (Custom CS 1054) and The Late Fantastically Great (Ember UK 3397)	Crown (5168)	

== Posthumous releases (after 1963) ==
=== Singles ===
List of posthumous singles with year, notes, label, and reference(s)
Year	Title; A-side / B-side	Notes	Label; (Cat. no.)	Ref(s)
1965	"It Hurts Me Too" / "Bleeding Heart"	The Enjoy release of "It Hurts Me Too" was recorded in 1962–1963; also released by Sue UK WI–383	Enjoy (2015 1st. pressing)	
1965	"It Hurts Me Too"/ "Pickin' the Blues" (instrumental)	Re-released by Fire in 1969 (2020) and 1976 (5000)	Enjoy (2015 2nd. pressing)	
1965	"Bleeding Heart" / "Mean Mistreatin' Mama"		Enjoy (2020)	
1965	"Everyday I Have the Blues" / "Dust My Broom"	The Enjoy release of "Dust My Broom" was recorded in 1959	Enjoy (2027)	
1965	"My Bleeding Heart"/ "One Way Out"	Re-release of Enjoy 2020 A-side with new B-side	Sphere Sound (702)	
1966	"Shake Your Moneymaker"/ "I Need You"	Re-release of Fire 504 A-side with new B-side	Sphere Sound (708)	
1966	"Sunny Land" / "Goodbye Baby"	Re-release of Flair 1057 B-side with re-release of Flair 1079 B-side	Kent (465)	
1966	"Dust My Broom"/ "Rollin' and Tumblin'"	Re-release of Enjoy 2027 B-side with re-release of Fire 1024 A-side	Sphere Sound (712)	
1966	"Something Inside of Me" / "She Done Move" (instrumental)		Sphere Sound (713)	
1968	"I Believe"/ "1839 Blues"	Re-release of Meteor (5000 A-side) with re-release of Flair (1039 B-side)	Kent (508)	
1972	"Everyday I Have the Blues"/ "Up Jumped Elmore" (instrumental)	Re-release of Enjoy 2027 A-side with new B-side	Fury (2000)	
1972	"Something Inside of Me"/"Fine Little Mama"	Re-release of Sphere Sound (713 A-side) with re-release of Fire (1031 B-side)	Fire (5001)	

=== Selected compilation albums ===
Numerous Elmore James compilation albums issued by a number of record companies have been released over the years. The following lists some of the more notable and current releases, including box sets:

List of compilation albums with year, notes, label, and reference(s)
Year	Title	Notes	Label; (Cat. no.)	Ref(s)
1965	The Sky Is Crying	12 Fire/Fury/Enjoy tracks	Sphere Sound (SSR 7002)	
1969	Whose Muddy Shoes	All Checker/Chess recordings; also includes songs by John Brim	Chess/MCA (9114)	
1975	Street Talkin'	All Chief recordings; also includes songs by Eddie Taylor	Muse (5087)	
1992	Elmore James: King of the Slide Guitar [2-CD box set]	50 Fire/Fury/Enjoy recordings	Capricorn (9 42006–2)	
1993	Elmore James: The Classic Early Records 1951–1956 [3-CD box set]	71 Meteor/Flair/Modern recordings	Virgin/Flair (72438 39632 25)	
1993	The Sky Is Crying: The History of Elmore James	21 tracks from various labels	Rhino (R2 71190)	
1995	The Best of Elmore James: The Early Years	28 Meteor/Flair/Modern tracks	Ace (CDCHD 583)	
2001	Shake Your Money Maker: The Best of the Fire Sessions	16 Fire/Fury/Enjoy tracks	Buddha/BMG (99781)	

== Elmore James as an accompanist ==
Although it is documented that Elmore James performed with Sonny Boy Williamson II, it is unclear which, if any, of Williamson's early recordings include James as a sideman. It is unknown if James performed on additional recordings by Big Joe Turner and Junior Wells.

=== Singles ===
List of singles as an accompanist with year, notes, label, and reference(s)
Year	Title; A-side / B-side	Notes	Label; (Cat. no.)	Ref(s)
1952	"Round House Boogie" / "Kickin' the Blues Around"	with J. T. Brown as Bep Brown Orchestra	Meteor (5001)	
1952	"Sax-ony Boogie" / "Dumb Woman Blues"	with J. T. Brown as Saxman Brown (A-side) and J. T. (Big Boy) Brown (B-side)	Meteor (5016)	
1953	"TV Mama" / "Oke-She-Moke-She-Pop"	with Big Joe Turner as Joe Turner and His Blues Kings	Atlantic (1016)	
1953	"Sweet Little Woman" / "I May Be Wrong"	with Little Johnny Jones as Little Johnny Jones and the Chicago Hound Dogs	Flair (1010)	
1953	"Somebody Done Hoodooed the Hoodoo Man" (Note: Sometimes titled "Hodo Man" on States Records singles; for album releases it was retitled "Hoodoo Man")	with Junior Wells as Junior Wells and His Eagle Rockers; Wells performs "Junior's Wail" without James	States (134)	

== Record charts ==
List of charting singles with year, title, label, peak chart position, and reference(s)
Year	Title; A-side / B-side	Label; (Cat. no.)	Peak; chart; position; US R&B	Ref(s)
1951	"Dust My Broom"	Trumpet (146)	9	
1952	"I Believe"	Meteor (5000)	9	
1953	"TV Mama" (with Big Joe Turner)	Atlantic (1016)	6	
1960	"The Sky Is Crying"	Fire (1016)	15	
1965	"It Hurts Me Too"	Enjoy (2015 1st. pressing)	25 (Note: "It Hurts Me Too" also reached number 106 on Billboard magazine's Bubbling Under Hot 100 Singles chart)	

== Notes ==
Footnotes

Citations

References

- Koda, Cub (1996). "Elmore James". In Erlewine, Michael; Bogdanov, Vladimir; Woodstra, Chris; Koda, Cub (eds.). All Music Guide to the Blues. San Francisco: Miller Freeman Books. ISBN 0-87930-424-3.
- Koester, Bob (1998). Junior Wells: Blues Hit Big Town (CD reissue notes). Junior Wells. Delmark Records. OCLC 717118914. DD-640.
- Haig, Diana; Morris, Chris (1992). King of the Slide Guitar (Box set notes). Elmore James. Capricorn Records. OCLC 26833148. 9 42006-2.
- Oliver, Paul (1989). Sonny Boy Williamson: King Biscuit Time (Album notes). Sonny Boy Williamson II. Arhoolie Records. OCLC 26211639. CD 310.
- Shurman, Dick (1986). Atlantic Blues: Guitar (Compilation album notes). Various artists. Atlantic Records. OCLC 48584433. 7 81695-2.
- Snowden, Don; Welding, Pete (1991). Whose Muddy Shoes (CD reissue notes). Elmore James. MCA Records/Chess Records. OCLC 25145866. CHD-9114.
- Topping, Ray (1993). Elmore James: The Classic Early Recordings 1951–1956 (Box set notes). Elmore James. Virgin Records America/Flair Records. OCLC 719630825. 7243 8 39632 2 5.
- Unterberger, Richie (1996). "Peter Green's Fleetwood Mac". In Erlewine, Michael; Bogdanov, Vladimir; Woodstra, Chris; Koda, Cub (eds.). All Music Guide to the Blues. San Francisco: Miller Freeman Books. ISBN 0-87930-424-3.
- Welding, Pete (1975). Elmore James: Street Talkin' (Album notes). Elmore James. Muse Records. OCLC 19462649. MCD 5087.
- Whitburn, Joel (1988). "Elmore James". Top R&B Singles 1942–1988. Menomonee Falls, Wisconsin: Record Research. ISBN 0-89820-068-7.
