= Johnny Barfield =

American singer-songwriter

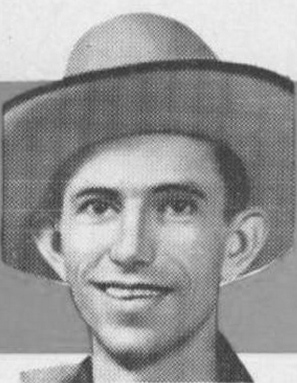
Johnny Barfield

John Alexander Barfield (March 3, 1909 – January 16, 1974) was an American country and old-time music performer, best known for his 1939 recording of "Boogie Woogie", the first country boogie.

He was born in Tifton, Georgia, and in his youth played guitar on street corners with his brother Coot. They recorded for Columbia Records in Atlanta in 1927, but the recordings were not released. Soon afterwards, Johnny Barfield became acquainted with Clayton McMichen and Bert Layne of the Skillet Lickers, touring with the group and recording with some of its offshoots, including McMichen's group, the Georgia Wildcats. By 1932, he was performing both solo, and as a member of Layne's band. In 1939, he won a recording contract with Bluebird Records, and released his version of "Boogie Woogie", a song derived from "Pinetop's Boogie Woogie" recorded in 1928 by Pinetop Smith. Barfield's song is considered the first country boogie, and became popular on jukeboxes.

Barfield recorded again in 1940 and 1941, but failed to repeat his earlier success. He continued to perform for several years. He died in 1974, aged 64.
