= Lillian Offitt =

American blues and R&B singer (1938–2020)

- Also known as: Lillian Williams
- Born: Lillian Etta Offitt; November 4, 1938; Gallatin, Tennessee, U.S.
- Died: February 27, 2020 (aged 81) Racine, Wisconsin, U.S.
- Genres: Rhythm and blues
- Occupation: Singer
- Years active: 1957–1974

Lillian Etta Offitt (November 4, 1938 – February 27, 2020) was an American blues and R&B singer.

== Biography ==
Born in Gallatin, Tennessee in 1938 (or 1937), she studied at Tennessee State University, and visited the offices of Nashboro Records in the hope of making a gospel record. The label owner, Ernie Young, suggested she record secular music instead, and her first record, "Miss You So", was issued on its subsidiary Excello label in 1957. It rose to number 8 on the Billboard R&B chart, and she turned professional, making appearances in Chicago and, later in the year, touring with Lowell Fulson, Johnny "Guitar" Watson and others. She moved to live in Chicago, where she performed in nightclubs and continued to release records, but with diminishing success.

In 1959 she joined Earl Hooker's band as a featured vocalist, and signed for Chief Records in Chicago. Her recording of "Will My Man Be Home Tonight?", featuring Hooker on guitar, became a regional hit but failed to make the national charts. Follow-up records again failed to be commercially successful, and she retired from music in the early 1960s to raise a family, being replaced on an intended American Folk Blues Festival tour of Europe by Sugar Pie DeSanto. Her last reported performance was in 1974, in St. Joseph, Michigan.

Offitt continued to live in Racine, Wisconsin, working outside the music business and raising her family. She died on February 27, 2020, aged 81.
