= Back on Top (Pinetop Perkins album) =

Back On Top

Studio album by Pinetop Perkins
- Released: 2000
- Genre: Blues
- Label: Telarc
- Producer: Randy Labbe

Back On Top is an album by blues pianist Pinetop Perkins. It was released in 2000 on Telarc.

== Production ==
Corey Harris and Sugar Ray Norcia make guest appearances on the album.

== Critical reception ==
Professional ratings
Review scores
Source	Rating
AllMusic	3/5 stars
The Encyclopedia of Popular Music	3/5 stars
The Penguin Guide to Blues Recordings	3/4 stars

Billboard wrote that "when it's time to boogie, [Perkins] delivers the barrelhouse numbers 'Pinetop's Boogie Woogie' and 'Down in Mississippi'." The Chicago Tribune wrote that "though his gruff voice keeps the songs bright, he shows fire only in short bursts, such as the bum-ba-bum-ba opening to 'Down In Mississippi'."

The StarPhoenix called Back on Top "a great blues album," writing that "some soulful harmonica work by Sugar Ray Norica is worth the price of admission alone." Keyboard wrote that "at 86, Pinetop rocks like a man a quarter his age, and this disc has enough great playing on it to keep students of the blues busy for a long time."

== Track listing ==
1. "Anna Lee" (Earl Hooker)
2. "Down in Mississippi" (Pinetop Perkins)
3. "Kansas City" (Jerry Leiber & Mike Stoller)
4. "Five Long Years" (Eddie Boyd)
5. "Pinetop's Boogie Woogie" (Pinetop Smith)
6. "Hi-Heel Sneakers" (Tommy Tucker)
7. "How Long, How Long Blues" (Leroy Carr)
8. "Just a Little Bit" (Rosco Gordon)
9. "Thinks Like a Million" (Pinetop Perkins)
10. "Pinetop's Blues" (Pinetop Perkins)
