= After Hours (Pinetop Perkins album) =

Studio album by Pinetop Perkins
- Released: 1988
- Studio: Chelsea Sound
- Genre: Blues
- Length: 45:24
- Label: Blind Pig
- Producer: Edward Chmelewski; Jerry Del Giudice

Pinetop Perkins chronology
After Hours (1988)	Pinetop Perkins with the Blue Ice Band (1992)

Professional ratings
Review scores
Source	Rating
AllMusic	4.5/5 stars
The Penguin Guide to Blues Recordings	1.5/4 stars

After Hours is the debut solo album by the American musician Pinetop Perkins. He was backed by the New York-based blues band Little Mike and the Tornadoes, using the Chicago blues approach. Released in 1988 by Blind Pig Records, the album, produced by Edward Chmelewski and Jerry Del Giudice, includes blues standards and original material. The album was recorded by Natasha Turner at Chelsea Sound, in New York City.

== Track listing ==
1. "Got My Mojo Working" – Preston Foster (3:45)
2. "After Hours" – Avery Parrish (4:08)
3. "The Hucklebuck" – Paul Williams (2:54)
4. "Sit in the Easy Chair" – Pinetop Perkins (4:20)
5. "Thinks Like a Million" – Pinetop Perkins (3:23)
6. "Chicken Shack" – Jimmy Smith (3:43)
7. "Hoochie Coochie Man" – Willie Dixon (4:47)
8. "Yancey Special" – Jimmy Yancey (3:05)
9. "Every Day I Have the Blues" – Peter Chapman [sic] (3:26)
10. "Anna Lee" – Robert Nighthawk (4:29)
11. "You Don't Have to Go" – Jimmy Reed (4:09)
12. "Pinetop's Boogie Woogie" – Pinetop Smith (3:15)

== Personnel ==
- Pinetop Perkins, piano and vocals
- Little Mike, Wang harmonica
- Brad Vickers, bass
- Tony O, guitar
- Pete DeCosta, drums
- Ronnie Earl, guitar on "You Don't Have to Go"
