= Johnny "Big Moose" Walker =

American blues pianist and organist

- Also known as: Big Moose, Busy Head, Moose John, J. W. Walker
- Born: John Mayon Walker; June 27, 1927; Stoneville, Mississippi, United States
- Died: November 27, 1999 (aged 72) Chicago, Illinois, United States
- Genres: Chicago blues, electric blues
- Occupations: Pianist, organist, bassist, singer
- Instruments: Piano, organ, bass guitar
- Years active: 1947–1991

Johnny "Big Moose" Walker (June 27, 1927 – November 27, 1999) was an American Chicago blues and electric blues pianist and organist. He worked with many blues musicians, including Ike Turner, Sonny Boy Williamson II, Lowell Fulson, Choker Campbell, Elmore James, Earl Hooker, Muddy Waters, Otis Spann, Sunnyland Slim, Jimmy Dawkins and Son Seals.

Walker was primarily a piano player but was also proficient on the electronic organ and the bass guitar (he played the bass guitar when backing Muddy Waters). He recorded solo albums and accompanied other musicians in concert and on recordings.

== Life and career ==
John Mayon Walker was born in the unincorporated community of Stoneville, Mississippi, partly of Native American ancestry. He acquired his best-known stage name in his childhood in Greenville, Mississippi, derived from his long, flowing hair. He learned to play several instruments, including the church organ, guitar, vibraphone and tuba.

He began his musical career as a pianist, in 1947, touring with various blues bands and backing such notable artists as Ike Turner, Sonny Boy Williamson II, Elmore James, Lowell Fulson and Choker Campbell. Walker served in the United States Army from 1952 to 1955, serving during the Korean War. In 1955, billed as Moose John, Ultra Records released the single, "Talkin' 'Bout Me". His own recordings, released under various names, were unsuccessful, but Walker started working more consistently in the mid-1950s, notably backing Earl Hooker and Elmore James. Walker moved to Chicago in the late 1950s and over the next decade accompanied Sunnyland Slim, Otis Rush, Muddy Waters (for whom Walker played bass guitar), Ricky Allen, Little Johnny Jones, and Howlin' Wolf. In 1960, he accompanied Junior Wells on his best-known recording, "Messin' with the Kid". The following year Walker played on James's recordings of "Look on Yonder Wall" and "Shake Your Moneymaker". In 1962, Walker played on Waters's recording of "You Shook Me". During the 1960s, a couple of obscure Chicago-based record labels, Age and The Blues, released Walker's solo singles.

By 1969, Walker had rejoined Earl Hooker and played on the latter's album Don't Have to Worry (ABC Bluesway). After Hooker's death in 1970, Walker played backing for Jimmy Dawkins, Mighty Joe Young and Louis Myers. His debut album, Ramblin' Woman, was issued in 1970 by ABC. He provided piano accompaniment on Andrew Odom's album Farther on the Road and on If You Miss 'Im...I Got 'Im, by John Lee Hooker, featuring Earl Hooker.

In December 1979, Willie James Lyons played guitar on Walker's album, Going Home Tomorrow.

Alligator Records used Walker's playing on their Living Chicago Blues series of recordings. He toured Europe in 1979 with the Chicago Blues Festival. His second album, Blue Love, was released in 1984. He later toured in New Zealand and Canada. He recorded with Son Seals and performed at the Burnley Blues Festival, in England, in 1991. Walker had a stroke prior to this engagement, and subsequent strokes left him unable to perform. Evidence Music reissued Blue Love in 1996, with five bonus tracks.

Walker lived in a nursing home in Chicago before his death, at the age of 72, in November 1999. The Killer Blues Project placed a headstone for Walker at the Oakridge Cemetery in Hillside, Illinois, in 2021.

== Discography ==
=== Solo albums ===
Year	Title	Record label
1970	Ramblin Woman	ABC
1979	Going Home Tomorrow	Isabel Records
1984	Blue Love	JSP
1994	Swear to Tell the Truth	JSP

=== Collaboration albums ===
Year	Title	Record label
1979	Lefty Dizz featuring Big Moose Walker	Black & Blue

=== As sideman ===
With Earl Hooker

- Don't Have to Worry (BluesWay, 1969)

With John Lee Hooker

- If You Miss 'Im...I Got 'Im (BluesWay, 1970) with Earl Hooker

With Lightnin' Hopkins

- Lightnin'! (Poppy, 1969)
- In the Key of Lightnin' (Tomato, 1969 [2002])

With Curtis Jones

- Trouble Blues (Bluesville, 1960)

== See also ==
- List of Chicago blues musicians
- List of electric blues musicians
