= Andrew Odom =

American blues singer (1936–1991)

- Also known as: Voice, Andrew "Big Voice" Odom, B.B., Little B.B., B.B. Junior, B.B. Odom, B.B. Andrew
- Born: December 15, 1936; Denham Springs, Louisiana, United States
- Died: December 23, 1991 (aged 55) Chicago, Illinois, United States
- Genres: Chicago blues, electric blues, soul blues
- Occupation(s): singer, songwriter
- Instrument: Vocals
- Years active: 1955–1991

Andrew Odom (December 15, 1936 – December 23, 1991) was an American Chicago blues and electric blues singer and songwriter. Born in Denham Springs, Louisiana, United States, he is best known for the close resemblance of his singing style to that of Bobby Bland and B.B. King. He recorded three solo albums in his lifetime and performed regularly around Chicago and further afield until his death.

== Life and career ==
Odom, who was African-American, was born in Denham Springs, Louisiana, United States, the son of Lula Odom on December 15, 1936. He learned to sing at his family's church. In 1955, he relocated to East St. Louis, Illinois, and began working with Albert King and Johnny Williams. In the late 1950s he sang with Johnny O'Neal's band. Through O'Neal he met Earl Hooker, with whom he recorded and performed for a number of years.

In 1960, he moved to Chicago, which was his home for the rest of his life. The following year, he recorded "East St. Louis" with the Little Aaron Band for a small label, Marlo Records. Another single of Odom's, "Turn On Your Love Light", credited to Andre Odom, was released by Nation Records in 1967.

Hooker, after being released from the hospital in 1968, assembled a new band and began performing in Chicago clubs and touring, against his doctor's advice. The band, with Odom as the vocalist and the pianist Pinetop Perkins, the harmonica player Carey Bell, the bassist Geno Skaggs and the steel guitar player Freddie Roulette, was "widely acclaimed" and "considered one of the best Earl had ever carried with him". On the recommendation of Buddy Guy, Arhoolie Records recorded 2 Bugs and a Roach by Hooker and his new band. Hooker's album Don't Have to Worry (1969) included instrumental selections and songs with vocals by Odom, Johnny "Big Moose" Walker, and Hooker. It has been said that the session had a "coherence and consistency" that helped make the album part of Hooker's "finest musical legacy".

Odom's debut album, Farther On Down the Road (recorded in 1969 and released in 1973), included his version of "Farther Up the Road", with accompaniment throughout by Hooker on guitar and Johnny "Big Moose" Walker on keyboards.

After Hooker's death, in April 1970, Odom worked for the next decade as a singer with Jimmy Dawkins. In 1971, Delmark Records released Dawkins's second album, All for Business, with Odom on vocals and Otis Rush on guitar. In 1974, Wasp Records issued the single "I Got This Bad Feeling", credited to B.B. Odom and the Earbenders.

In 1982, Odom recorded his second solo album, Feel So Good, with accompaniment by Magic Slim and the Teardrops, which was issued by the small French record label Black & Blue Records. It was reissued by Evidence Music in 1993.

Flying Fish Records released Odom's third album, Goin' to California, in 1991. The album, co-produced by Steve Freund and including guitar accompaniment by Steve Katz, has been considered Odom's best recorded work.

On December 23, 1991, Odom suffered a fatal heart attack while driving from the blues club Buddy Guy's Legends to his next scheduled appearance at the Checkerboard Lounge. He was dead on arrival at Cook County Hospital, in Chicago. In 2015 the Killer Blues Project placed a headstone for Andrew Odem at Washington Memory Gardens in Homewood, Illinois.

Some of his work appeared on the compilation album The Chicago Blues Box: The MCM Records Story.

== Discography ==
=== Albums ===
| Year | Title | Record label |
|---|---|---|
| 1969 | Farther On Down the Road | BluesWay Records |
| 1977 | Going to California | MCM Records |
| 1982 | Feel So Good | Evidence Music |
| 1991 | Goin' to California | Flying Fish Records |

=== As sideman ===
| Year | Title | Artist/Band | Record label | Ref. |
|---|---|---|---|---|
| 1969 | 2 Bugs and a Roach | Earl Hooker | Arhoolie Records | |
| 1969 | Don't Have to Worry | Earl Hooker | BluesWay Records | |
| 1991 | The 2120 Sessions | André Christovam | Estúdio Eldorado (Brazil) | |

== See also ==
- List of Chicago blues musicians

== Bibliography ==
- Strachwitz, Chris (1998). The Moon Is Rising (album notes). Earl Hooker. Arhoolie Records. CD 468.
- Danchin, Sebastian (2001). Earl Hooker: Blues Master. Jackson: University Press of Mississippi. ISBN 1-57806-306-X.
