= Back on Top =

Back on Top may refer to:

- Back on Top (Van Morrison album), 1999
  - "Back on Top" (song)
- Back on Top (O'Jays album), 1968
- Back on Top (Pinetop Perkins album), 2000
- Back on Top (The Front Bottoms album), 2015
