= Freddie Roulette =

American lap steel guitarist and singer (1939–2022)

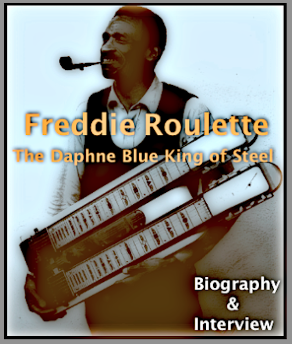

Background information
- Born: Frederick Martin Roulette; May 3, 1939; Evanston, Illinois, U.S.
- Died: December 24, 2022 (aged 83)
- Genres: Chicago blues, electric blues
- Occupation: Guitarist
- Instrument: Lap steel guitar
- Years active: 1960s–2022
- Labels: Janus, Rykodisc, others

Frederick Martin Roulette (May 3, 1939 – December 24, 2022) was an American electric blues lap steel guitarist and singer. He was best known as an exponent of the lap steel guitar. He was a member of the band Daphne Blue and collaborated with Earl Hooker, Charlie Musselwhite, Henry Kaiser, and Harvey Mandel. He also released several solo albums. One commentator described Roulette as an "excellent musician".

A short documentary of Freddie Roulette appears on the video-sharing site YouTube that chronicles Roulette's time with the Daphne Blue Band. The online Blues encyclopedia, "All About Blues Music," describes Roulette's long tenure with the Daphne Blue Band and notes: "Freddie has also released an album, ‘Daphne Blue: Legendary Blues Instrumentals’ which contains 15 excellent tracks, which [Freddie] considers to be among his finest works."

The National Association of Music Merchants (NAMM) noted "Freddie Roulette pioneered the use of the slide guitar in the blues style. When he began playing slide guitar he was emulating country and western music and felt the instrument would fit nicely in old blues traditions, which he adapted to great success. In fact, his playing has been a strong influence on a new generation of blues musicians both for his strumming style and the emotion he has brought to the instrument." NAMM compiled an oral history of the artist on video.

== Biography ==
Roulette's family was originally from New Orleans, but he was born and raised in Evanston, Illinois. He learned to play the steel guitar in high school. He started playing in clubs in Chicago in his teens, and in 1965 began work in Earl Hooker's backing band, touring and performing with him until 1969.

Hooker's band, with the pianist Pinetop Perkins, the harmonica player Carey Bell, the vocalist Andrew Odom, and Roulette, was "widely acclaimed" and "considered one of the best Earl had ever carried with him". Roulette performed on several of Hooker's singles; his 1967 album, The Genius of Earl Hooker; and the 1969 follow-up, 2 Bugs and a Roach.

Roulette later developed a friendship with Charlie Musselwhite and (credited as Fred Roulette) recorded with him on the 1969 album Chicago Blue Stars. He toured with Musselwhite and backed him on the albums Tennessee Woman and Memphis, Tennessee, before relocating to the San Francisco, California, area where he has lived ever since. He played there in a band with Luther Tucker and recorded with Earl Hooker's cousin John Lee Hooker.

After leaving Chicago for the San Francisco Bay area, Roulette began "teaming up with the 14-year-old guitarist Ray Bronner ('Daphne Blue Ray'), and some veterans from Chicago in the band Daphne Blue, Freddie was often joined by ‘Big Moose’ (Johnny Walker), ‘Pinetop Perkins’ and Clarence ‘Gatemouth’ Brown at gigs and on record." "Freddie released an album, Daphne Blue: Legendary Blues Instrumentals, which contains 15 excellent tracks, which he considers to be among his finest works."

In 1973, Roulette released his debut solo album, Sweet Funky Steel, which was produced by the guitarist Harvey Mandel. Don "Sugarcane" Harris played on several tracks. Over the next 20 years, Roulette continued to perform with other musicians and occasionally led his own band, while also working full-time as an apartment manager. On the 1996 album Psychedelic Guitar Circus, he worked in a group with Mandel, Kaiser and Steve Kimock. The producer Larry Hoffman brought Roulette to Chicago where the artist recorded his 1997 album, Back in Chicago: Jammin' with Willie Kent and the Gents, backed by the Willie Kent Band featuring Chico Banks on guitar. It was released on Hi Horse Records. The album won an award from Living Blues magazine as 'Best Blues Album of 1997'. Following that album's success, Roulette began performing widely at blues festivals and recorded the 1998 album Spirit of Steel, featuring the Holmes Brothers and produced by Kaiser. He also contributed to Kaiser's album Yo Miles, a tribute to Miles Davis.

Roulette's solo album Man of Steel (2006) featured guitar playing by Will Bernard and David Lindley; Kaiser also played guitar and produced the album. It was recorded in Fantasy Studios, in Berkeley, California, and included strains of jazz, country, soul and reggae in the overall blues setting. In the same year, Roulette played locally in a small combo including Mike Hinton.

Roulette played at numerous music festivals over the years, including the Long Beach Blues Festival, the San Francisco Blues Festival (1979), and the Calgary Folk Music Festival (2000). He continued to play club dates in the San Francisco area, often with Mandel. In 2012, Jammin' With Friends was recorded at three separate studios with various musicians. It was produced by Michael Borbridge, who also played drums on all the tracks.

As of 2015, Roulette was still playing with the Daphne Blue Band.

In February 2019, the Chicago Reader published an article on Roulette and his band members, along with sound clips, titled: "The Secret History of Chicago Music: Pivotal Musicians That Somehow Haven't Gotten Their Just Dues."

Roulette died on December 24, 2022, at the age of 83.

== Discography ==
| Year | Title | Record label |
|---|---|---|
| 1970 | Chicago Blue Stars with Charlie Musselwhite, Skip Rose, Louis Myers, Jack Myers, Fred Below, Steve Kimock, Harvey Mandel | Blue Thumb Records |
| 1973 | Sweet Funky Steel | Janus Records |
| 2022 | For Nate; Recorded 1995 with Randy Resnick | Each Hit Music |
| 1995 | To Love with Randy Resnick | Resmo/Night & Day |
| 1996 | The Psychedelic Guitar Circus with Henry Kaiser, Steve Kimock, and Harvey Mandel | Rykodisc Records |
| 1997 | Back in Chicago: Jammin' with Willie Kent and the Gents | Hi Horse Records |
| 1999 | Spirit of Steel | Tradition & Moderne Records |
| 2000 | Black White & Blue: Daphne Blue Band | Daphne Blue |
| 2000 | 10 Picture Disk | Hi Horse Records |
| 2006 | Man of Steel | Tradition & Moderne Records |
| 2012 | Jammin' with Friends | Electric Snake |
| 2015 | Daphne Blue, The Legendary Blues Instrumentals featuring Earl Hooker, Ray Bronner, Freddie Roulette, Pinetop Perkins, Big Moose Walker, and Buddy Miles | Steel Blue Records (reissue of vinyl collectors' edition album) |

== See also ==
- List of electric blues musicians
