= Jeffrey Carp =

American harmonica player

- Carp c. early 1970s

Background information
- Born: July 6, 1948; New York City, U.S.
- Died: January 1973 (aged 24)
- Occupation: Musician
- Instrument: Harmonica
- Years active: 1960s–1973

Jeffrey M. Carp (July 6, 1948 – January 1973) was an American blues harmonica player. He was best known for his work with Muddy Waters, John Lee Hooker, and Howlin' Wolf. He played harmonica on numerous charting blues albums. He was also for a period of time, a side man in Earl Hooker's band.

== Early life ==
Carp was born in New York City. As a teenager, he led the Jeff Carp Blues Band, a group that included violinist Joel Smirnoff.

== Career ==
Carp joined Sam Lay's band with guitarist Paul Asbell and the group recorded three songs for the LP Goin' To Chicago, released in 1966 on Testament Records.

Among the artists recorded with were Muddy Waters and Howlin' Wolf. He played on albums If You Miss 'Im ... I Got 'Im by John Lee Hooker and The London Howlin' Wolf Sessions by Howlin' Wolf. A prodigy, he was said to have played beyond his years.

He also recorded with Muddy Waters, Earl Hooker, John Lee Hooker, The Soulful Strings, Patti Drew, and Marlena Shaw.

He appeared on the 1969 Muddy Waters album, Fathers and Sons.

In April 1969, he was at the recording session for Fathers and Sons by Muddy Waters. Other musicians present were Paul Butterfield, Mike Bloomfield, Paul Asbell, Otis Spann and Donald "Duck" Dunn. In May, 1969, he played on the Lightnin' album by Lightnin' Hopkins which was produced by Chris Strachwitz. Also that month, he played on Earl Hooker's Funk album. Carp also contributed vocals to the album. Carp had actually been sitting in with Hooker for while from late 1968 to early 1969. After some of Hooker's side men left, Carp and guitarist Paul Asbell were brought in as band members. Carp filled in the missing ingredient for the group that had come about due to Carey Bell's departure.

In May 1970, along with Howlin' Wolf, Hubert Sumlin and Chess Records producer Norman Dayron, Carp travelled to London for a recording session. He was playing at London's Olympic Studio, in the recording session that took place between the 2nd and 7th of that month which would result in Howlin' Wolf's London Sessions.

Critics and producers described him in superlative terms. A reviewer of the reissued London Howlin' Wolf Sessions said "the late Jeffrey Carp provided fireballs of musical punctuation via his blistering shots on harmonica." Norman Dayron described him as "the most important talent I've worked with". Writing about a live concert by Earl Hooker in San Francisco in 1969, a reviewer said, "Mouth harpist Jeff Carp ... is magnificent - for my money better than Paul Butterfield (more musical, more inventive)". Rolling Stone wrote of Fathers and Sons "talking about harmonica playing, there’s superlative chromatic work by Jeff Carp ... he does a hell of a job".

Carp is also credited as the composer of "Bring Me Home", sung by Tracy Nelson as the title track of the 1971 Mother Earth, Bring Me Home album, on Reprise Records.

== Death ==
There are only two people alive today who actually know what happened. I am one. Jeff and his wife Scarlet and her daughter Natasha and Jeff's best friend Steve Klee were living in Key Caulker with a little boat called the Lion R. A Pacific Ocean racer called the Escudero stopped there and agreed to let them to join and head out with them into the Pacific Ocean. From Key Caulker they went in the Escudero to the Panama Canal. The two separate groups did not get along well. A drug dealer from Panama came aboard the boat for a New Year's Eve party. Unfortunately, a more important boat arrived for New Year's Eve and the Escudero was moved to the edge of the canal. Whatever drugs they were consuming caused one of the girls on the boat to die from convulsions and one of the other sailors stabbed Steve . Everyone except Jeff jumped overboard and swam to a nearby boat which refused to allow them to board. They then swam to another boat which allowed them to come aboard. The captain of the Escudero helped Jeff climb into a small boat behind the Escudero. One can assume that Jeff hoped to get in the small boat and row to where his family and friends were. The owner let go of the rope holding the boat. Unfortunately, the boat only had one oar and it could not be rowed. It was swept out to see by the current and Jeff was never seen again. January 1 found Jeff dead, Steve in jail and Scarlett and Natasha being followed everywhere by the Panama police. Some kindly British sailors helped Scarlet and Natasha sneak out of Panama and eventually Steve got out of jail. He came back to Chicago and became a multimillionaire with a seat on the stock market. Unfortunately, he died high with a needle in his arm. Scarlet founded a firm which consulted in building better prisons. She later passed from cancer. Jeff was 24 years old.

== Discography ==
- 1966 - Goin' To Chicago (Sam Lay Blues Band)
- 1969 - Fathers and Sons (Muddy Waters)
- 1969 - String Fever (The Soulful Strings)
- 1969 - If You Miss 'Im...I Got 'Im (John Lee Hooker featuring Earl Hooker)
- 1969 - Don't Have to Worry (Earl Hooker)
- 1969 - Funk (Earl Hooker)
- 1969 - Wild Is Love (Patti Drew)
- 1969 - The Spice Of Life (Marlena Shaw)
- 1970 - Tulane (Chuck Berry)
- 1971 - The London Howlin' Wolf Sessions (Howling Wolf)
