= Boogie =

Musical style

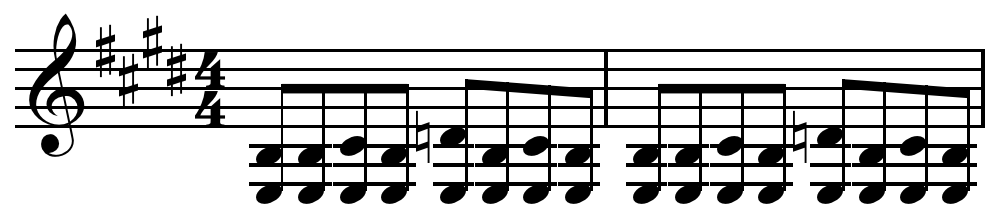
Blues shuffle or boogie played on guitar in E major.

Boogie is a repetitive, swung note or shuffle rhythm, "groove" or pattern used in blues which was originally played on the piano in boogie-woogie music. The characteristic rhythm and feel of the boogie was then adapted to guitar, double bass, and other instruments. The earliest recorded boogie-woogie song was in 1916. By the 1930s, swing bands such as Benny Goodman, Glenn Miller, Tommy Dorsey and Louis Jordan all had boogie hits. By the 1950s, boogie became incorporated into the emerging rockabilly and rock and roll styles. In the late 1980s and the early 1990s, country bands released country boogies. Today, the term "boogie" usually refers to dancing to pop, disco, or rock music.

== History ==
The boogie was originally played on the piano in boogie-woogie music and adapted to guitar. Boogie-woogie is a style of blues piano playing characterized by an up-tempo rhythm, a repeated melodic pattern in the bass, and a series of improvised variations in the treble. Boogie woogie developed from a piano style that developed in the rough barrelhouse bars in the Southern states, where a piano player performed for the hard-drinking patrons.

The origin of the term boogie-woogie is unknown, according to Webster's Third New International Dictionary. The Oxford English Dictionary states that the word is a redoubling of boogie, which was used for rent parties as early as 1913. The term may be derived from Black West African English, from the Sierra Leone term "bogi", which means "to dance"; as well, it may be akin to the phrase "hausa buga", which means "to beat drums". In the late 1920s and early 1930s, the term "could mean anything from a racy style of dance to a raucous party or to a sexually transmitted disease." In Peter Silvester's book on boogie woogie, Left Hand Like God – the Story of Boogie Woogie he states that, in 1929, "boogie-woogie is used to mean either dancing or music in the city of Detroit".

Boogie hit the charts with Pine Top Smith's Pine Top's Boogie in 1929, which garnered the number 20 spot. In the late 1930s, boogie became part of the then popular Swing style, as big bands such as "Glenn Miller, Tommy Dorsey, and Louis Jordan...all had boogie hits." Swing big band audiences expected to hear boogie tunes, because the beat could be used for the then-popular dances such as the jitterbug and the Lindy Hop. As well, country artists began playing boogie woogie in the late 1930s, when Johnny Barfield recorded "Boogie Woogie". The Delmore Brothers "Freight Train Boogie" shows how country music and blues were being blended to form the genre which would become known as rockabilly. The Sun Records-era rockabilly sound used "wild country boogie piano" as part of its sound.

By the early 1950s, boogie became less popular, but the new rock and roll sometimes incorporated its patterns. In the 1960s, a new form, boogie rock, emerged. However, it did not rely on the same patterns as the earlier styles. By the mid-1970s, the meaning of the term returned to its roots, in a certain sense, as during the disco era, "to boogie" meant "to dance in a disco style" with one hit song in particular sung by the Euro disco group Silver Convention, "Get Up and Boogie".

== Usage ==
The boogie groove is often used in rock and roll and country music. A simple rhythm guitar or accompaniment boogie pattern, sometimes called country boogie, is as follows:

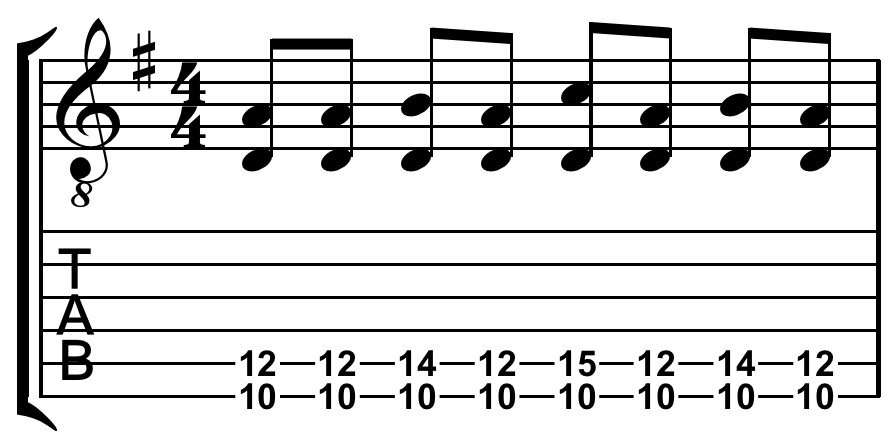

The "B" and "C" notes are played by stretching the fourth finger from the "A" two and three frets up to "B" and "C" respectively on the same string. This pattern is an elaboration or decoration of the chord or level and is the same on all the primary triads (I, IV, V), although the dominant, or any chord, may include the seventh on the third beat (see also, degree (music)).

"Rhythm Boogie"
A basic boogie rhythm riff (0:19; Ogg Vorbis, 154 KB)

A simple lead guitar boogie pattern is as follows:

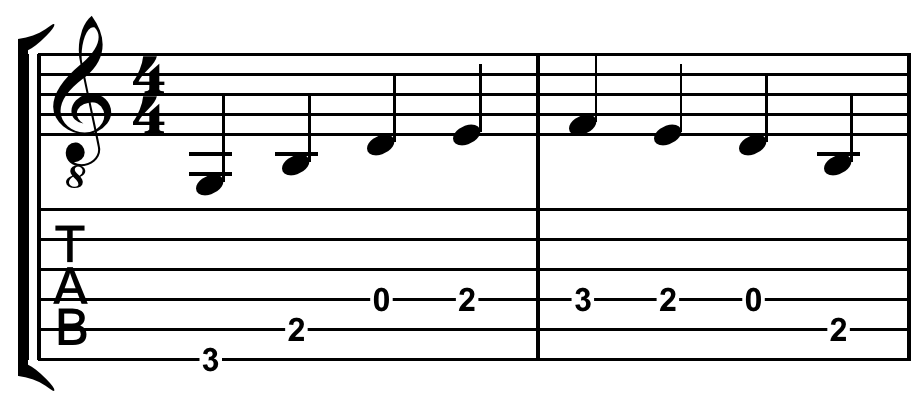

"Lead Boogie"
A basic boogie lead riff (0:15; Ogg Vorbis, 134 KB)

Boogie patterns are played with a swing or shuffle rhythm and generally follow the "one finger per fret" rule, where, as in the case directly above, if the third finger always covers the notes on the third fret, the second finger going only on the second fret, etc.

The swung notes or shuffle note are a rhythmic device in which the duration of the initial note in a pair is augmented and that of the second is diminished. Also known as "notes inégales", swung notes are widely used in jazz music and other jazz-influenced music such as blues and Western swing. A swing or shuffle rhythm is the rhythm produced by playing repeated pairs of notes in this way.

== See also ==
- Boogie-woogie
- Boogie rock
