= Born in the Delta =

Studio album by Pinetop Perkins
- Released: 1997
- Recorded: November 1996
- Genre: Blues
- Length: 46:35
- Label: Telarc
- Producer: Randy Labbe

Professional ratings
Review scores
Source	Rating
AllMusic	3/5 stars
Chicago Tribune	3/4 stars
The Penguin Guide to Blues Recordings	2.5/4 stars

Born in the Delta is an album by blues pianist Pinetop Perkins, released on May 27, 1997. Perkins was 83 years old when he recorded the album in 1996, having begun his recording career late in life.

== Musicians ==
- Pinetop Perkins - piano, vocals
- Tony O. - guitar (Anthony O. Melio is a member of Little Mike and the Tornadoes)
- Jerry Portnoy - harmonica (on "Murmur Low")
- Willie "Big Eyes" Smith - drums
- Brad Vickers - bass

== Track listing ==
1. "Every Day I Have the Blues" - Peter Chatman, Memphis Slim
2. "For You My Love" - Paul Gayten
3. "Look on Yonder Wall" - Elmore James
4. "Blues After Hours" - Robert Bruce, William Feyne, Avery Parrish
5. "Murmur Low" - Arthur Spires
6. "How Long, How Long Blues" - Leroy Carr, J. Mayo Williams
7. "Baby What You Want Me to Do" - Jimmy Reed
8. "Blues Oh Blues" - Anthony Melio
