= Sweet Black Angel (Earl Hooker album) =

Studio album by Earl Hooker
- Released: 1969
- Recorded: May 1969
- Studio: Los Angeles, CA
- Genre: Blues
- Length: 28:09
- Label: Blue Thumb; BTS 12
- Producer: Bob Krasnow, Ike Turner

Earl Hooker chronology
2 Bugs and a Roach (1969)	Sweet Black Angel (1969)	Don't Have to Worry (1969)

Sweet Black Angel is an album by blues musician Earl Hooker released on the Blue Thumb label in 1969. The album was co-produced by musician Ike Turner and Blue Thumb founder Bob Krasnow.

== Reception ==
Professional ratings
Review scores
Source	Rating
AllMusic	3/5 stars
The Penguin Guide to Blues Recordings	2.5/4 stars

The AllMusic review stated: "It's a wide-ranging collection, as its oddly generic song titles ("Country and Western," "Shuffle," "Funky Blues") would eloquently indicate."

== Track listing ==
1. "I Feel Good" (James Brown) – 2:02
2. "Drivin' Wheel" (Roosevelt Sykes) – 3:19
3. "Shuffle" (Bob Krasnow, Earl Hooker, Ike Turner) – 2:49
4. "Country and Western" (Hooker) – 3:05
5. "Sweet Home Chicago" (Robert Johnson, Adapted by Earl Hooker) – 2:52
6. "Sweet Black Angel" (Robert Nighthawk) – 2:31
7. "Boogie, Don't Blot!" (Krasnow, Turner) – 2:26
8. "Cross Cut Saw" (R. G. Ford) – 2:24
9. "Catfish Blues" (Krasnow, Hooker, Turner) – 2:36
10. "The Mood" (Hooker, Turner) – 1:38
11. "Funky Blues" (Turner) – 2:27

== Personnel ==
- Earl Hooker – guitar, vocals
- Mack Simmons – speech, harmonica
- Ike Turner – piano, guitar ("The Mood")
- Soko Richardson – drums
- Possibly Jesse Knight Jr – bass
