= Chico Banks =

American guitarist and singer

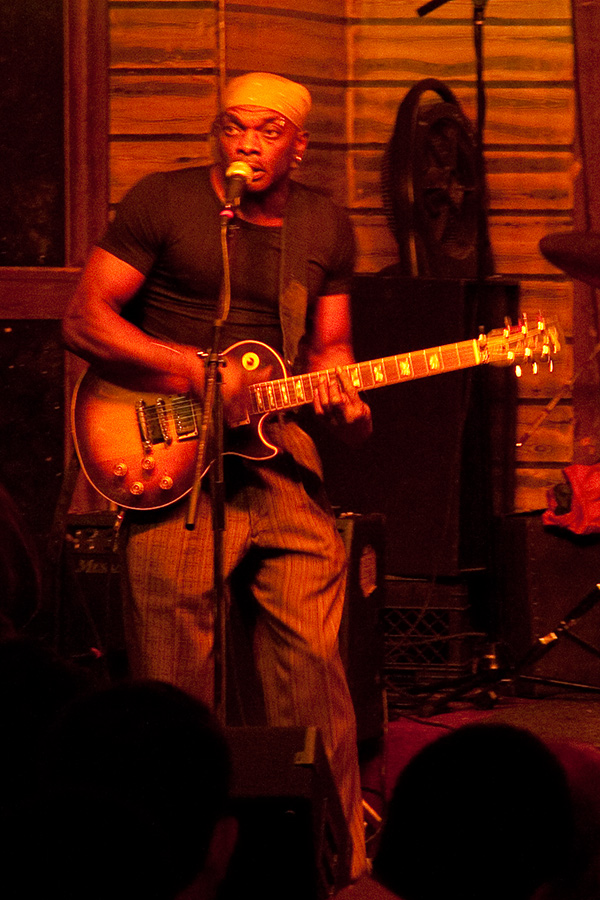
- Image of Chico Banks

Background information
- Born: Vernon Banks; March 7, 1962; Chicago, Illinois, United States
- Died: December 3, 2008 (aged 46) Chicago, Illinois, United States
- Genres: Chicago blues, electric blues
- Occupation(s): Guitarist, singer
- Instrument: Guitar
- Years active: Late 1970s–2007
- Labels: Evidence

Chico Banks (March 7, 1962 – December 3, 2008) was an American Chicago blues guitarist and singer. He released one album, in 1997 on Evidence Music, produced by Larry Hoffman. Banks was both a band leader and sideman, having played with Chicago's blues musicians from his late teens until his death at the age of 46. He is best known for his tracks "Your Fine" and "Candy Lickin' Man". He was the son of the guitarist Jessie Banks, who played backing for the Mighty Clouds of Joy.

One commentator noted that Banks "focuses on good-time, upbeat blues". He was an influence on the guitarist and singer Reggie Sears.

== Biography ==
He was born Vernon X. Banks in Chicago, Illinois.

Banks was inspired by Magic Sam, Buddy Guy, Albert King, Jimi Hendrix, Otis Clay, George Benson and Tyrone Davis. His blues guitar playing incorporated jazz and funk stylings. He first played in a covers group in his mid-teens. He later worked with Guy and Clay plus Melvin Taylor, James Cotton, Little Milton, Magic Slim, and Big Time Sarah. He contributed to the album Long Way to Ol' Miss, by Willie Kent (1996), as well as to the album Back in Chicago by Freddie Roulette, which featured Willie Kent and the Gents.

His debut album, Candy Lickin' Man, including vocals by Mavis Staples, was produced by Larry Hoffman, and released by Evidence Records in 1997. Banks played on Lee "Shot" Williams's album Let the Good Times Roll in 2002 and on Tyrone Davis's album Come to Daddy in 2003.

In 2007, Banks underwent surgery for a faulty heart valve. He died in Chicago in December 2008, at the age of 46.

== See also ==
- List of Chicago blues musicians
- List of electric blues musicians
