= I Feel Good! =

1970 studio album by John Lee Hooker

Studio album by John Lee Hooker
- Released: 1970
- Recorded: October 1969
- Studio: Paris, France
- Genre: Blues
- Length: 39:57
- Label: Carson; Jewel

John Lee Hooker chronology
If You Miss 'Im...I Got 'Im (1969)	I Feel Good! (1970)	I Wanna Dance All Night (1970)

I Feel Good! is a studio album by American blues musician John Lee Hooker. It was originally released in 1970 through Carson in France, before being released in the US via Jewel Records in 1971. The recording sessions took place in Paris in October 1969.

== Critical reception ==
Professional ratings
Review scores
Source	Rating
AllMusic	4.5/5 stars

AllMusic's Bruce Eder stated: "Nine songs recorded double-quick in one session, with Lowell Fulson on lead guitar on most of it. The rare embellishment on a Hooker release makes for unusually complex and rewarding listening, instrumentally speaking, beneath Hooker's ominous vocals. The textures here are very crisp and vivid, with a crunchiness that should make this an LP of choice for Hooker's rock fans, much more so than, say, the Canned Heat collaborations ... The uncredited band that shows up on some of these cuts is loose enough to follow Hooker, and he and Fulson play like one person".

== Track listing ==
All tracks are written by John Lee Hooker.

No.	Title	Length
1.	"I Feel Good"	4:05
2.	"Baby Baby"	4:27
3.	"Dazie Mae"	4:23
4.	"Stand By"	6:20
5.	"Going Home"	3:05
6.	"Looking Back over My Day"	4:30
7.	"Roll and Tumble"	3:00
8.	"Baby Don't Do Me Wrong"	5:00
9.	"Come on Baby"	5:07
Total length:		39:57

== Personnel ==
- John Lee Hooker — vocals, guitar
- Lowell Fulson — guitar
- Carey Bell — bass
- S.P. Leary — drums
- Gilbert Moreau — photography
