= Them Update Blues =

Studio album by Lowell Fulson
- Released: 1995
- Genres: Blues, West Coast blues
- Length: 42:31
- Label: Bullseye Blues
- Producer: Ron Levy

Lowell Fulson chronology
Sinner's Prayer (1995)	Them Update Blues (1995)	Mean Old Lonesome Blues (1996)

Them Update Blues is an album by the American musician Lowell Fulson, released in 1995. It was nominated for the Grammy Award for Best Traditional Blues Album. Them Update Blues was Fulson's second album for Bullseye Blues as well as his final studio album.

== Production ==
Them Update Blues was produced by Ron Levy. Fulson wrote or cowrote the album's eleven songs. He was backed by the South Central Rhythm section. The Memphis Horns contributed to some of the tracks.

== Critical reception ==
Professional ratings
Review scores
Source	Rating
AllMusic	3/5 stars
The Encyclopedia of Popular Music	3/5 stars
MusicHound Blues: The Essential Album Guide	3.5/5 stars
The Penguin Guide to Blues Recordings	2.5/4 stars
Pittsburgh Post-Gazette	3/4 stars

The Pittsburgh Post-Gazette wrote that "these are picture-perfect West Coast blues—like fine brandy—smooth and sensuous with just the right edge." Stereo Review said that Fulson's "electric-guitar playing, juke-joint raw, wastes no notes, and his simultaneously gruff and mellow vocals get the job done with economy." The Retford, Gainsborough and Worksop Times noted that Fulson maintains "very high musical standards with gritty commitment."

The Age praised Fulson's "unhurried voice and flowing guitar" on "Sun Going Down". The Lake Geneva Regional News labeled the music "seductive and spiky." Metro Silicon Valley opined that "Sun Going Down" "ranks up there with the best of the West Coast blues pioneer's midnight-hour grinders, while the title track percolates with the down-home soul of Memphis-cooked stew."

AllMusic noted Fulson's "customary biting guitar and insinuating vocals."

== Track listing ==
No.	Title	Length
1.	"What's the Matter Baby"	3:58
2.	"Think About It"	4:56
3.	"Don't Lie"	3:45
4.	"My Secret Love"	3:15
5.	"Sun Going Down"	5:18
6.	"Get On Down (Them Update Blues)"	3:29
7.	"Lonely Man"	2:58
8.	"Forty-Four"	4:00
9.	"Too Soon to Tell"	3:55
10.	"Not a Dime"	3:15
11.	"L & L Special"	3:42
Total length:		42:31
