= 2 Bugs and a Roach =

Studio album by Earl Hooker
- Released: 1969
- Recorded: November 12, 14 & 15, 1968
- Studio: Sound Studios, Chicago, IL
- Genre: Blues
- Label: Arhoolie; F/ST 1044
- Producer: Chris Strachwitz

Earl Hooker chronology
| The Genius of Earl Hooker (1967) | 2 Bugs and a Roach (1969) | Sweet Black Angel (1969) |

2 Bugs and a Roach is an album by blues musician Earl Hooker released by the Arhoolie label in 1969. Jimmy Page wanted a Gibson EDS-1275 guitar, after seeing the sleeve.

== Reception ==
Professional ratings
Review scores
| Source | Rating |
|---|---|
| AllMusic | 4.5/5 stars |
| The Penguin Guide to Blues Recordings | 3.5/4 stars |

The AllMusic review stated: "Earl Hooker's Two Bugs and a Roach is a varied lot, with vocals from Hooker, Andrew Odom, and Carey Bell in between the instrumentals, all cut in 1968. All in all, it's one of the must-haves in this artist's very small discography -- a nice representative sample from Chicago's unsung master of the electric guitar".

== Track listing ==
All compositions credited to Earl Hooker except where noted

1. "Anna Lee" (McCoy, Hooker) – 6:30
2. "Off the Hook" – 3:54
3. "Love Ain't a Plaything" (Carey Bell) – 4:58
4. "You Don't Want Me" – 5:16
5. "Two Bugs and a Roach" – 4:19
6. "Wah Wah Blues" – 4:36
7. "You Don't Love Me" (Andrew Odom) – 5:37
8. "Earl Hooker Blues" – 5:14

== Personnel ==
- Earl Hooker – guitar, vocals
- Joe Willie Perkins – piano, organ
- Fred Roulette – steel guitar
- Geno Skaggs – bass guitar
- Levi Warren (tracks 2, 4, 7 & 8), Fred Williams (tracks 1, 3, 5 & 6) – drums
- Louis Myers – harmonica (track 1)
- Carey Bell – lead vocals, harmonica (track 3)
- Andrew "B.B. Jr." Odom – lead vocals (track 7), backing vocals (track 5)
