= Messin' with the Kid =

Song first recorded by Junior Wells in 1960

Single by Junior Wells
- B-side: "Universal Rock"
- Released: 1960
- Recorded: October 17, 1960
- Studio: Universal, Chicago
- Genre: Blues
- Length: 2:12
- Label: Chief
- Songwriter: Mel London
- Producer: Mel London

Junior Wells singles chronology
| "Galloping Horses a Lazy Mule" (1960) | "Messin' with the Kid" (1960) | "I'm a Stranger" (1961) |

"Messin' with the Kid" is a rhythm and blues-influenced blues song originally recorded by Junior Wells in 1960. Chief Records owner/songwriter/producer Mel London is credited as the songwriter. Considered a blues standard, it is Junior Wells's best-known song. "Messin' with the Kid" was inducted into the Blues Hall of Fame and has been recorded by a variety of blues and other artists.

== Background and composition ==
"Messin' with the Kid" is an up-tempo twelve-bar blues which alternates between Afro-Cuban- and Little Richard-style rhythmic accompaniment. According to Junior Wells, the title was inspired by his young daughter Gina. Mel London arrived early at Wells' home to pick him up for a scheduled recording session: "'Where's you Daddy at? Get him up'. 'No, you said you were goin' to be here at nine o'clock. It's not nine o'clock ... You're not goin' to be messin' with the kid'". "The Kid" was a nickname for Wells. Later in the studio, they needed another song for the session: "one thing led to another and ... it took us five minutes, maybe ten minutes and we had it".

What's this you hear goin' all around town
The people are sayin' you're gonna to put The Kid down
Well oh lord, well look at what you did
You can call it what you wanna, but I call it messin' with The Kid

== Recording and releases ==
Wells recorded "Messin' with the Kid" in Chicago in 1960. He sings the song, but unlike most of his early singles, Wells does not play harmonica. The backup is provided by Earl Hooker on guitar, Johnny "Big Moose" Walker on piano, Jack Myers on bass, Fred Below on drums, Jarrett Gibson on tenor saxophone, and Donald Hankins on baritone saxophone. Chief Records (owned by the song's writer Mel London) released the song on a single in 1961.

In 1966, Wells recorded a second version of "Messin' with the Kid". It features a different rhythm arrangement and includes a harmonica solo by Wells with backup by Buddy Guy on guitar along with Myers and Below. The song was released on the 1966 blues compilation Chicago/The Blues/Today! Vol. 1. Wells and Guy used a similar arrangement for "Snatch It Back and Hold It" on their influential Hoodoo Man Blues album (1965). The duo later recorded several live versions of the song, including in 1977 for Live in Montreux.

== Recognition and legacy ==
In 1998, the Blues Foundation inducted "Messin' with the Kid" into the Blues Hall of Fame as a "Classic of Blues Recordings – Singles or Album Tracks". In a 1998 press release, the Foundation noted:

"Messin' With the Kid" also foreshadowed where Junior was about to take the Blues. On Chicago’s West Side, his contemporaries Buddy Guy, Otis Rush and Magic Sam Maghett were incorporating the emotional dynamism of Soul music into the Delta-bred sounds upon which they were raised. While in the South Side’s watering holes, Junior began fusing old-school Blues with the funky beat of modern R&B. Together these men defined the sound of electric Blues’ second generation.

Irish guitarist Rory Gallagher recorded a rock adaptation of "Messin' with the Kid" for his album Live in Europe (1972). The song became one of Gallagher's "signature tunes" and in an album review, it is described as a "gem" and a "smoking version". The Blues Brothers recorded a live performance of "Messin' with the Kid", which was included on their first album Briefcase Full of Blues (1978). In a song review for AllMusic, Richard Gilliam notes that while the album "seems so little influenced by Chicago-style blues[,] the band did find room for this Junior Wells classic, adding the sort of rich instrumental backing that Wells himself would adopt for the song". Wells later recorded a reworked version of the tune with a full backing band including horns for his 1993 album Better Off with the Blues.

"Messin' with the Kid" inspired later songs. Soon after the Chief single, Muddy Waters recorded an answer song titled "Messin' with the Man" for Chess Records in 1961. In 1977, blues singer Eddie C. Campbell recorded a Christmas novelty song, titled "Santa's Messin' With the Kid" (on King of the Jungle), in which Santa is "messing with" the wife of the Kid, until "The Kid ran him out o' town":

Santa come' once a year we all know, didn't use my chimney had a key to my do'
Oh, Lord, look what Santa did, (he's messin' with me)
Call it Merry Christmas?, I say Santa's messin' with The Kid
