= Don't Have to Worry =

Studio album by Earl Hooker
- Released: 1969
- Recorded: May 29, 1969
- Studio: Vault Recordings, Los Angeles, California, United States
- Genre: Blues
- Length: 46:30
- Label: BluesWay; BLS 6032
- Producer: Ed Michel

Earl Hooker chronology
Sweet Black Angel (1969)	Don't Have to Worry (1969)	If You Miss 'Im...I Got 'Im (1970)

Don't Have to Worry is an album by blues musician Earl Hooker released by the BluesWay label in 1969.

Professional ratings
Review scores
Source	Rating
AllMusic	3/5 stars

== Track listing ==
All compositions credited to Earl Hooker except where noted

1. "The Sky Is Crying" (Elmore James, M. C. Robinson) – 4:17
2. "Hookin'" – 4:17
3. "Is You Ever Seen a One-Eyed Woman Cry" (Johnny Walker) – 3:42
4. "You Got to Lose" – 5:42
5. "Blue Guitar" – 3:51
6. "Moanin' and Groanin'" (Andrew Odom) – 4:47
7. "Universal Rock" – 4:08
8. "Look Over Yonder Wall" (James Clark) – 3:05
9. "Don't Have to Worry" – 4:18
10. "Come to Me Right Away, Baby" (Odom) – 3:42

== Personnel ==
- Earl Hooker – guitar, vocals
- Little Andrew "Blues Boy" Odom – lead vocals (tracks 1, 6 & 10)
- Paul Asbell – guitar
- Jeffrey Carp – harmonica
- Johnny "Big Moose" Walker – piano, organ, vocals
- Chester E. "Gino" Skaggs – bass
- Roosevelt Shaw – drums
