= Mel London =

American songwriter, record producer and record label owner (1932–1975)

- Born: Melvin R. London; April 9, 1932; Mississippi, U.S.
- Died: May 16, 1975 (aged 43) Chicago
- Genres: Blues; R&B
- Occupations: Songwriter; record producer; record label owner
- Years active: 1950s–1960s
- Labels: Chief; Profile; Age

Mel London (April 9, 1932 – May 16, 1975) was an American songwriter, record producer, and record label owner. He was active in the Chicago blues and R&B scenes in the 1950s and 1960s. London is best known for his compositions for Chicago blues artists Howlin' Wolf, Muddy Waters, Elmore James, and Junior Wells as well as being the record producer and owner of Chief Records (and its Profile Records and Age Records subsidiaries).

In 1954, Mel London wrote the first of several hit songs for the blues and R&B markets. His "Poison Ivy" was recorded by Willie Mabon and reached number seven in the Billboard R&B chart in 1954. In 1955, three hits written by London followed: "Who Will Be Next" by Howlin' Wolf and two by Muddy Waters - "Sugar Sweet" and "Manish Boy." Not content with just songwriting, in 1957 he started his own record label, Chief Records. Chief's first single, the London-penned "Man from the Island," featured London's solo outing as a lead vocalist. Subsequent Chief releases were produced (and sometimes written) by London and featured Chicago blues artists, such as Elmore James, Junior Wells, Magic Sam, Earl Hooker, and A.C. Reed. London's "Little by Little" was a hit for Junior Wells in 1960, reaching number 23 in the Billboard R&B chart. London also wrote several R&B songs that were recorded by Chief artists, including "Cut You A-Loose" by Ricky Allen, which reached number 20 in 1963.

Chief/Profile/Age experienced financial difficulties in the early 1960s and went out of business in 1964. Later, Mel London was associated with a number of small record labels, including All-Points, Mel/Mel-Lon, Bright Star, and Starville, but none had the impact of his earlier labels. In 1975, London died at the age of 43. During his career, he wrote or co-wrote 48 songs and produced about 80 singles by approximately 37 artists.

The rights to the labels in which Mel London was involved as an owner or in a similar capacity are currently held by P-VINE .

== Partial discography ==
Year	Title	Performer	Label (number)	R&B chart peak position
1954	"Poison Ivy"	Willie Mabon	Chess (1580)	7
1955	"Who Will Be Next"	Howlin' Wolf	Chess (1593)	14
1955	"Manish Boy"	Muddy Waters	Chess (1602)	5
1955	"Sugar Sweet"	Muddy Waters	Chess (1612)	11
1957	"Man from the Island"	Mel London	Chief (7000)	
1957	"The 12 Year Old Boy"	Elmore James	Chief (7001)	
1957	"Cry for Me"	Elmore James	Chief (7006)	
1960	"Will My Man Be Home Tonight"	Lillian Offitt	Chief (7012)	
1960	"Messin' with the Kid"	Junior Wells	Chief (7021)	
1960	"Little by Little"	Junior Wells	Profile (4011)	23
1960	"Come on in This House"	Junior Wells	Profile (4011)	
1963	"Cut You A-Loose"	Ricky Allen	Age (29118)	20
