= Sweet Black Angel (Pinetop Perkins album) =

Studio album by Pinetop Perkins
- Released: April 20, 1998
- Studio: Ambient Recording Co., Easton, Connecticut
- Genre: Blues
- Label: Gitanes/Universal Records
- Producer: Jay Newland

Professional ratings
Review scores
| Source | Rating |
|---|---|
| The Penguin Guide to Blues Recordings | 3.5/4 stars |

Sweet Black Angel is an album recorded by blues pianist Pinetop Perkins and released in 1998. The title track is a cover of Robert Nighthawk's 1949 "Black Angel Blues (Sweet Black Angel)" . That track was based on Lucille Bogan's, "Black Angel Blues" from 1930 (covered by Tampa Red in 1934 with the same title, and recut by Tampa Red in 1950 as "Sweet Little Angel.") B. B. King later covered "Sweet Black Angel" as, "Sweet Little Angel", in 1956.

The last track featured Perkins playing a boogie on acoustic guitar and remarking on the apparent clumsiness of his finger work.

== Track listing ==
1. "Lend Me Your Love" (Leonard Allen, Peter Chatman)
2. "What's the Matter with the Mill" (Minnie McCoy)
3. "Five Long Years" - (Eddie Boyd)
4. "Down The Road I'll Go" (Clifford Curry)
5. "View From the Top" (Mark Kazanoff)
6. "Look on Yonder Wall" - (Bill "Jazz" Gillum)
7. "Who's Ol' Muddy Shoes" (Elmore James)
8. "I'd Rather Quit Her Than Hit Her" (Bill Klinefelter, Willie Perkins)
9. "Rain" (Holly Bullamore, Johnny Copeland)
10. "Pinetop's Special" (Willie Perkins)
11. "How Long Blues" (Leroy Carr)
12. "Sweet Black Angel" (Robert McCollum)

== Personnel ==
- Pinetop Perkins - piano, vocals
- Kaz Kazanoff - tenor saxophone, harmonica, vocals
- Gordon Beadle - baritone saxophone, vocals
- Bob Margolin - guitar, vocals
- Duke Robillard - guitar
- Calvin Jones - bass
- Willie "Big Eyes" Smith - drums
- Jay Newland - vocals
