= If You Miss 'Im...I Got 'Im =

Studio album by John Lee Hooker featuring Earl Hooker
- Released: 1970
- Recorded: May 29, 1969
- Studio: Vault Recordings, Los Angeles
- Genre: Blues
- Length: 46:30
- Label: BluesWay
- Producer: Ed Michel

John Lee Hooker chronology
That's Where It's At!1969 (1969)	If You Miss 'Im...I Got 'Im (1970)	I Feel Good! (1970)

Earl Hooker chronology
Don't Have to Worry (1969)	If You Miss 'Im...I Got 'Im (1970)	Hooker and Steve (1970)

If You Miss 'Im...I Got 'Im is an album by blues musician John Lee Hooker with his cousin Earl Hooker released by the BluesWay label in 1970.

== Reception ==
Professional ratings
Review scores
Source	Rating
AllMusic	2/5 stars
The Penguin Guide to Blues Recordings	2.5/4 stars

The AllMusic review stated: "This album is marked by the interaction between John Lee Hooker and his guitar-playing cousin Earl. Earl, who succumbed to illness in 1970, was a fine bluesman in his own right, possessing a formidable slide technique. Many are unaware that the two often performed together, and the band that accompanies John Lee here also backed Earl frequently ... Heard here less than a year before his death, Earl still sounds frisky and versatile, often utilizing a funky wah-wah style without ever descending into the psychedelic excesses that plagued so many late-'60s electric blues albums ... On If You Miss 'Im, John Lee definitely benefits from keeping it in the family".

== Track listing ==
All compositions credited to John Lee Hooker

1. "The Hookers (If You Miss 'Im...I Got 'Im)" – 4:41
2. "Baby, I Love You" – 4:08
3. "Lonesome Mood" – 5:11
4. "Bang Bang Bang Bang" – 4:45
5. "If You Take Care of Me, I'll Take Care of You" – 3:33
6. "Baby, Be Strong" – 5:03
7. "I Wanna Be Your Puppy, Baby" – 8:06
8. "I Don't Care When You Go" – 2:34
9. "Have Mercy on My Soul!" – 7:54

== Personnel ==
- John Lee Hooker – guitar, vocals
- Earl Hooker – guitar
- Paul Asbell – guitar (tracks 4 & 9)
- Jeffrey Carp – harmonica
- Johnny "Big Moose" Walker – piano, organ
- Chester "Gino" Skaggs – bass
- Roosevelt Shaw – drums
