= Piano Blues (film) =

- Written by: Peter Guralnick
- Directed by: Clint Eastwood
- Starring: Marcia Ball; Dave Brubeck; Ray Charles; Pinetop Perkins

Production
- Producers: Clint Eastwood; Bruce Ricker
- Cinematography: Vic Losick
- Editors: Joel Cox, Gary Roach

Original release
- Release: 2003

Piano Blues is a 2003 documentary film directed by Clint Eastwood as the seventh installment of the documentary film series The Blues produced by Martin Scorsese. The film features interviews and live performances of piano players Ray Charles, Dave Brubeck, Dr. John and Marcia Ball.

In the documentary Eastwood explores his lifelong passion for piano blues and jazz. He interviews artists as Ray Charles, Dr. John, Marcia Ball, Pinetop Perkins, Dave Brubeck, Jay McShann, Henry Gray and shows archival performances of Dorothy Donegan, Fats Domino, Otis Spann, Art Tatum, Albert Simmons, Pete Johnson, Jay McShann, Big Joe Turner, Nat King Cole, Martha Davis, Professor Longhair, Charles Brown and Duke Ellington. Remarkable are two early performances of the Chess Records houseband with Otis Spann (piano), Willie Dixon (bass) and, probably, Fred Below (drums).

Eastwood shows his interest in jazz music with an interview and performance of improvising musician Pete Jolly, who introduces Phineas Newborn. Also Oscar Peterson and Thelonious Monk are present in the film with several performances. Eastwood explains his love for piano playing because of how his mother brought many Fats Waller records home saying; "This is real piano playing!".

As Clint Eastwood states in the documentary, "I've always felt that jazz and blues were true American art forms. Maybe the only really original art forms that we have."
