= It's a Good Day (album) =

Studio album by Lowell Fulson
- Released: 1988
- Recorded: November 1987
- Genre: Blues
- Label: Rounder
- Producer: Ron Levy

Lowell Fulson chronology
| San Francisco Blues (1988) | It's a Good Day (1988) | Hold On (1992) |

It's a Good Day is an album by the American musician Lowell Fulson, released in 1988. He had not recorded for an American record label in around 20 years. Fulson supported it with a North American tour.

== Production ==
Recorded in November 1987, the album was produced by Ron Levy, who also contributed on piano. Fulson was backed by a band dubbed the Black Top Rhythm Section as well as a New Orleans horn section. Many of the songs had been written or previously recorded by Fulson. The title track is an admonitory tale about adultery.

== Critical reception ==
Professional ratings
Review scores
| Source | Rating |
|---|---|
| All Music Guide to the Blues | 3/5 stars |
| The Cincinnati Post | 3/5 stars |
| The Grove Press Guide to the Blues on CD | 4/5 stars |
| Houston Chronicle | 4/5 stars |
| Los Angeles Times | 2.5/4 stars |
| MusicHound Blues: The Essential Album Guide | 3/5 stars |
| Orlando Sentinel | 4/5 stars |
| The Penguin Guide to Blues Recordings | 3/4 stars |
| The Rolling Stone Jazz & Blues Album Guide | 3.5/5 stars |

The Orlando Sentinel praised "Thanks a Lot" and "I'm Tough". The Los Angeles Times noted that "flash is not Fulson's style—his guitar leads are economically spiky and his singing seductively smooth". The Houston Chronicle said that "his clean, sophisticated, polished style shines". The Courier-Journal opined that "the song structures are too rigid to allow the band to kick out the stops consistently". The Pittsburgh Press stated that It's a Good Day is a "fine reminder of the timeless quality of Fulson's gently swinging blues."

== Track listing ==
| No. | Title | Length |
|---|---|---|
| 1. | "Thanks a Lot" |
| 2. | "It's a Good Day" |
| 3. | "Ten More Shows" |
| 4. | "Your Love for Me Is Gone" |
| 5. | "I'm Tough" |
| 6. | "Keep That Smile" |
| 7. | "Slow Down Baby" |
| 8. | "Blues and My Guitar" |
| 9. | "One More Blues" |
| 10. | "Push On" |
