= Little Mike and the Tornadoes =

- Origin: New York, New York, United States
- Genres: Blues, rock and roll
- Years active: 1978–present
- Labels: Blind Pig, Flying Fish, Ichiban, CD Baby
- Website: Official website

Little Mike and the Tornadoes are an American blues and rock and roll band from New York City. They are known for their high energy blues sound, modeled after the Chicago bands in the 1950s. Since 1990, they have released nine albums on a variety of record labels.

AllMusic noted that the band's frontman, harmonica and keyboard player, Mike Markowitz, "is an extremely hard working, level-headed blues musician".

== Career ==
The band's leader, Mike Markowitz was born on November 23. 1955, in Queens, New York City, New York, United States. Raised in New York's then expanding blues environment, Markowitz was initially influenced by the work of John Lee Hooker, Muddy Waters, and Little Walter. He commenced playing the harmonica at the age of 14 and progressed to the piano within a couple of years. Upon hearing Hooker playing live, coupled with Paul Butterfield on record, led Markowitz to regularly attending concerts and forming a number of blues bands in his teenage years. In 1978, he formed the Tornadoes, and their local reputation saw them back Big Walter Horton, Otis Rush, Bo Diddley, Lightnin' Hopkins, and Big Mama Thornton. This work carried them forward as a touring outfit, providing backing behind Pinetop Perkins, Hubert Sumlin, and Jimmy Rogers. In 1988, the band contributed to, and Markowitz produced, Pinetop Perkin's first release, After Hours. Hubert Sumlin's Heart & Soul, was released the following year, with the band again playing on and Markowitz producing the record.

Little Mike and the Tornadoes first recording contract was signed in 1990 with Blind Pig Records, who issued their debut album, Heart Attack, the same year. The album had guest appearances from Perkins, Sumlin, Butterfield, Ronnie Earl, and Big Daddy Kinsey. The band toured promoting the album, playing across North America and Europe. In 1992, Blind Pig issued the band's follow-up work, Payday, before the band signed and recorded for Flying Fish Records (which has since been acquired by Rounder Records). This resulted in their third album, Flynn's Place.

By 1998, the band had moved on to Ichiban Records, who issued their next recording, Hot Shot. Shortly after its release, Markowitz was involved in his second traffic accident. Although no-one was hurt, Markowitz took stock having a wife and two children at home. In total he spent almost ten years away from the music industry. Markowitz relocated near to Gainesville, Florida, and his band went their separate ways. Their guitarist, Tony O. Melio (formerly the lead guitarist with the Legendary Blues Band), continued working in the business. Their bassist, Brad Vickers, formed Brad Vickers and his Vestapolitans, and their drummer, Rob Piazza, undertook studio session work. In addition, Blind Pig released a compilation album in 2012 called Heaven by Pinetop Perkins, on which Markowitz played the harmonica and also co-produced the collection.

In 2013, Forgive Me was released jointly on CD Baby and Elrob Records, but it contained material recorded over a decade earlier. However the original line-up reformed at that time and eventually issued All the Right Moves. It contained eleven tracks penned by Markowitz with a couple more songs written by Melio and Vickers. Jim McKaba played the piano as a guest performer on the album, and Sonny Rhodes also contributed to the recording. Little Mike and the Tornadoes toured in the summer months of 2014, 2015 and 2016, playing at various concert dates and music festivals in parts of the US and Europe. In February 2015, Live at the St. Augustine Bluzfest, was released with their special guest vocalist, Zora Young. It was issued at the same time as Friday Night, billed as by Zora Young with Little Mike and the Tornaodes. Within that busy period, the band jointly contributed to Genuine Blues Legends, an album recorded by themselves, backing Pinetop Perkins and Jimmy Rogers,

Their most recent album, How Long?, was released in August 2016.

== Discography ==
Year	Title	Record label
1990	Heart Attack	Blind Pig Records
1992	Payday	Blind Pig Records
1995	Flynn's Place	Flying Fish Records
1998	Hot Shot	Ichiban Records
2013	Forgive Me	CD Baby/Elrob Records
2014	All the Right Moves	CD Baby
2015	Live at the St. Augustine Bluzfest	CD Baby
2015	Friday Night ‡	CD Baby
2016	How Long?	CD Baby/Elrob Records

‡ - Credited to Zora Young & Little Mike and the Tornadoes
