= Chief Records =

American record company

- Single label with distinctive Indian profile design
- Founded: 1957
- Founder: Mel London
- Status: Defunct
- Genre: Blues, rhythm and blues
- Country of origin: U.S.
- Location: Chicago

Chief Records, together with its Profile and Age subsidiaries, was an independent record label that operated from 1957 to 1964. Best known for its recordings of Chicago blues artists Elmore James, Junior Wells, Magic Sam, and Earl Hooker, the label had a diverse roster and included R&B artists Lillian Offitt and Ricky Allen.

Chief Records was founded in Chicago in 1957 by Mel London, a 25-year-old R&B entrepreneur. London served as producer and wrote several of the label's best-known songs. Earl Hooker, one of the most well-regarded blues guitarists of his era, was an important contributor to the label. He worked closely with London and "was involved in over a dozen recording sessions, and his playing was featured on some forty titles and twenty-five singles, a dozen of which were released under his own name, the rest being ascribed to Junior Wells, A.C. Reed, Lillian Offitt, and Ricky Allen". Among Hooker's recordings are several slide-guitar instrumentals, including the 1961 Age single "Blue Guitar", which Muddy Waters later overdubbed a vocal and titled it "You Shook Me".

"Little by Little", written by Mel London, was a hit for Junior Wells, reaching number 23 in the Billboard R&B chart in 1960. Wells continued to perform and record several of his Chief and Profile songs ("Messin' with the Kid", "Come on in This House", and "It Hurts Me Too") during his career. "Cut You Loose", another London composition, was a hit for Ricky Allen; the song reached number 20 in 1963. Next to Wells, Allen had the most singles on the label (all on Age).

As with many independent blues labels in the early 1960s, Chief was plagued by financial problems. First to be discontinued were the Chief and Profile labels; finally the Age label was discontinued in 1964 and the company went out of business. During its seven years of operation, Chief/Profile/Age released about 80 singles (including reissues) from approximately 37 artists. Later, various singles (including reissues) by Chief artists were released by All-Points Records, Mel/Mel-Lon Records, Bright Star Records, and Starville Records, but none had the impact of the originals.

Currently, P-VINE holds the rights to Chief Records.

== Partial discography ==
List of releases with year, artist, title, label, and catalogue number
Year	Artist	Title (A-side / B-side)	Label	Cat. no.
1957	Mel London	"Man from the Island" / "Doggin' Me Around"	Chief	7000
1957	Elmore James	"Coming Home" / "The Twelve Year Old Boy"	Chief	7001
1957	Elmore James	"It Hurts Me Too" / "Elmore's Contribution to Jazz"	Chief	7004
1957	Junior Wells	"Two Headed Woman" / "Lovey Dovey Lovely One"	Chief	7005
1957	Elmore James	"Cry for Me" / "Take Me Where You Go"	Chief	7006
1958	Junior Wells	"I Could Cry" / "Cha Cha Cha in Blue"	Chief	7008
1960	Junior Wells	"Little By Little" / "Come on in This House"	Profile	4011
1960	Lillian Offitt	"Will My Man Be Home Tonight" / "The Man Won't Work"	Chief	7012
1960	Magic Sam & the Ammons Sisters	"Mister Charlie" / "My Love Is Your Love"	Chief	7013
1960	Lillian Offitt	"Oh Mama" / "My Man Is a Lover"	Chief	7015
1960	Junior Wells (A) / Earl Hooker (B)	"Galloping Horses A Lazy Mule" (A) / "Blues in D Natural" (B)	Chief	7016
1960	Magic Sam	"Square Dance Rock Part 1" / "Square Dance Rock Part 2"	Chief	7017
1960	Elmore James (A) / Earl Hooker (B)	"Knocking at Your Door" (A) / "Calling All Blues" (B)	Chief	7020
1960	Junior Wells	"Messin' with the Kid" / "Universal Rock"	Chief	7021
1960	Junior Wells	"You Don't Care" / "Prison Bars All Around Me"	Profile	4013
1961	Magic Sam	"Every Night About This Time" / "Do the Camel Walk"	Chief	7026
1961	Junior Wells	"I'm a Stranger" / "Things I'd Do for You"	Chief	7030
1961	Earl Hooker	"Rockin' with the Kid" / "Rockin' Wild"	Chief	7031
1961	Magic Sam	"You Don't Have to Work" / "Blues Light Boogie"	Chief	7033
1961	Junior Wells	"You Sure Look Good to Me" / "Lovey Dovey Lovely One"	Chief	7034
1961	Junior Wells	"It Hurts Me Too" / "Cha Cha Cha in Blue"	Chief	7035
1961	Junior Wells	"So Tired" / "Love Me"	Chief	7037
1961	Junior Wells	"I Need Me a Car" / "I Could Cry"	Chief	7038
1961	A.C. Reed (A) / Earl Hooker (B)	"This Little Voice" (A) / "Apache War Dance" (B)	Age	29101
1961	Ricky Allen	"You'd Better Be Sure" / "You Were My Teacher"	Age	29102
1961	Earl Hooker	"Blue Guitar" / "Swear to Tell the Truth"	Age	29106
1962	Reggie "Guitar" Boyd	"Nothing but Poison" / "Nothing but Good"	Age	29110
1962	Earl Hooker	"How Long Can This Go On" / "These Cotton Pickin' Blues"	Age	29111
1962	A.C. Reed	"Mean Cop" / "That Ain't Right"	Age	29112
1962	Big Moose & the Jams	"The Bright Sound" a.k.a. "Bright Sounds" / "Off the Hook"	Age	29113
1962	Earl Hooker & the Earlettes	"Win the Dance" a.k.a. "Crying Blues" / "That Man"	Age	29114
1963	Ricky Allen	"Cut You A-Loose" / "Faith"	Age	29118
1963	Jackie Brenston with Earl Hooker Band	"Want You to Rock Me" / "Down in My Heart"	Mel-Lon	1000
1963	Earl Hooker	"The Leading Brand" / "Blues in D Natural"	Mel-Lon	1001
1964	A.C. Reed	"Lotta Loving" / "I Stay Mad"	Age	29123
1964	Ricky Allen	"Help Me Mama" / "The Big Fight"	Age	29125

== Sources ==
- Dahl, Bill (1996). "Earl Hooker". In Erlewine, Michael; Bogdanov, Vladimir; Woodstra, Chris; Koda, Cub (eds.). All Music Guide to the Blues. San Francisco: Miller Freeman Books. ISBN 0-87930-424-3.
- Danchin, Sebastian (2001). Earl Hooker: Blues Master. Jackson, Mississippi: University Press of Mississippi. ISBN 978-1-57806-307-9.
- Herzhaft, Gerard (1992). "Earl Hooker". Encyclopedia of the Blues. Fayetteville, Arkansas: University of Arkansas Press. ISBN 1-55728-252-8.
- Whitburn, Joel (1988). "Artist entries". Top R&B Singles 1942–1988. Menomonee Falls, Wisconsin: Record Research. ISBN 0-89820-068-7.
