= Pinetop Perkins =

American blues pianist (1913–2011)

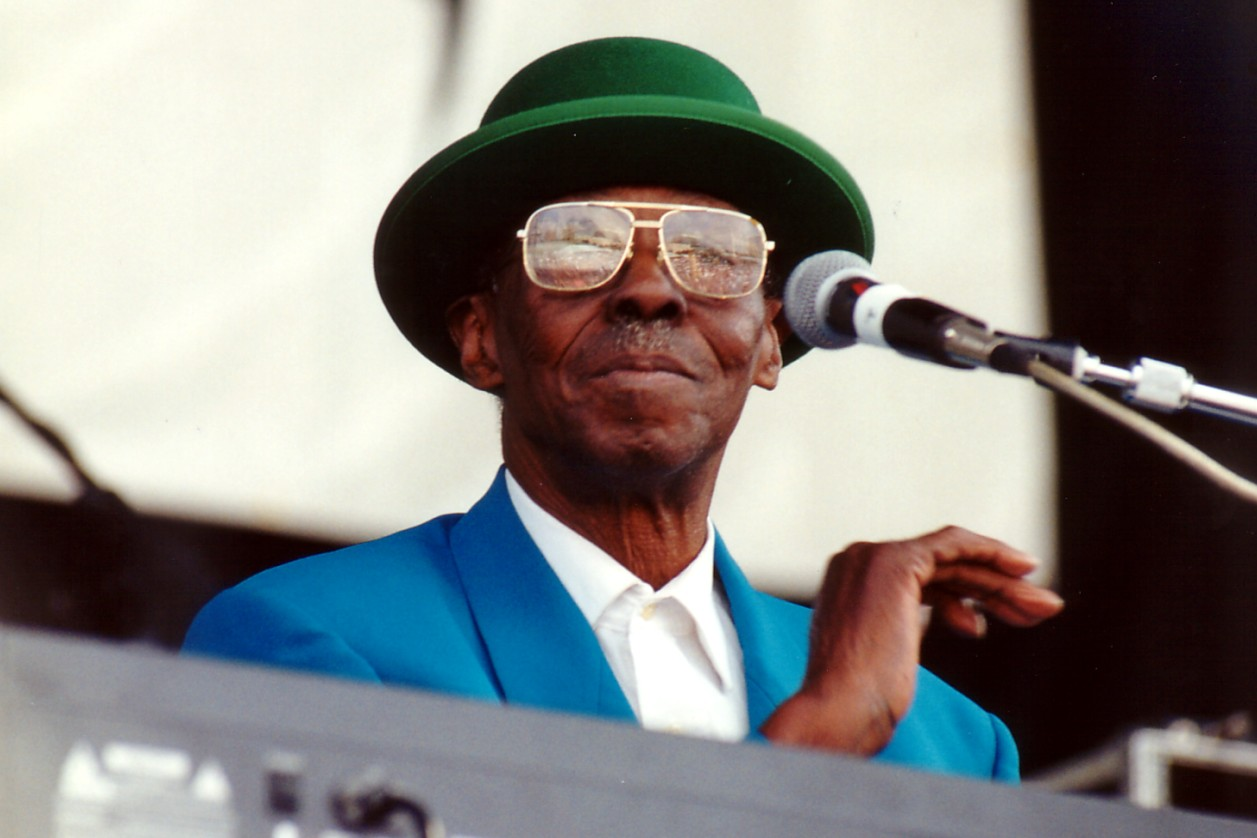
- Perkins at the Riverwalk Blues Festival in Fort Lauderdale, Florida, 2006

Background information
- Born: Joe Willie Perkins; July 7, 1913; Belzoni, Mississippi, U.S.
- Died: March 21, 2011 (aged 97) Austin, Texas, U.S.
- Genres: Piano blues, boogie-woogie, Delta blues, Chicago blues
- Occupations: Musician, singer
- Instruments: Piano, vocals, keyboards
- Years active: 1920s–2011
- Labels: Blind Pig, Antone's

Joe Willie "Pinetop" Perkins (July 7, 1913 – March 21, 2011) was an American blues pianist. He played with some of the most influential blues and rock-and-roll performers of his time and received numerous honors, including a Grammy Lifetime Achievement Award and induction into the Blues Hall of Fame.

== Life and career ==
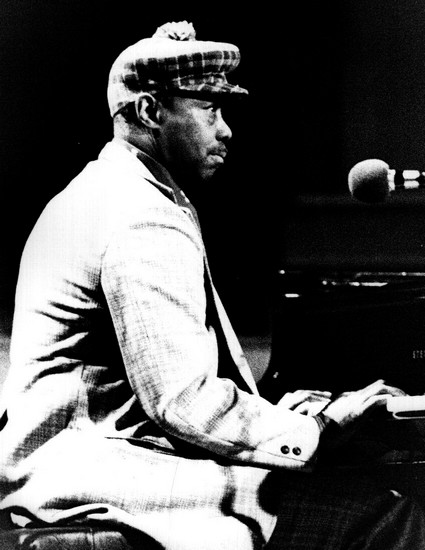
Perkins in 1976

=== Early career ===
Perkins was born in Belzoni, Mississippi and raised on a plantation in Honey Island, Mississippi. He began his career as a guitarist but then injured the tendons in his left arm in a knife fight with a chorus girl in Helena, Arkansas in the 1940s. Unable to play the guitar, he switched to the piano. He also moved from Robert Nighthawk's radio program on KFFA to Sonny Boy Williamson's King Biscuit Time. He continued working with Nighthawk, however, accompanying him on "Jackson Town Gal" in 1950.

In the 1950s, Perkins joined Earl Hooker and began touring. He recorded "Pinetop's Boogie Woogie" at Sam Phillips's Sun Studio in Memphis, Tennessee. The tune was written by Pinetop Smith, who created the original recording in 1928. Perkins didn't write; he "got as high as third grade in school." He learned to play-off Smith's records. As Perkins recalled, "They used to call me 'Pinetop' because I played that song."

Perkins then relocated to Illinois and left the music business until Hooker persuaded him to record again in 1968. Perkins replaced Otis Spann in the Muddy Waters band when Spann left the band in 1969. After ten years with that organization, he formed the Legendary Blues Band with Willie "Big Eyes" Smith, recording from the late 1970s to the early 1990s.

=== Later career ===
Perkins played a brief musical cameo on the street outside Aretha's Soul Food Cafe in the 1980 movie The Blues Brothers, having an argument with John Lee Hooker over who wrote "Boom Boom". He also appeared in the 1987 movie Angel Heart as a member of guitarist Toots Sweet's band.

Perkins was a sideman on countless recordings but never had an album devoted solely to his artistry until After Hours, released by Blind Pig Records in 1988. The tour in support of the album featured Jimmy Rogers and guitarist Hubert Sumlin.

The death of Perkins's common law wife, Sara Lewis, in 1995, triggered a depression and periods of drinking. In 1998, he released the album Legends, featuring Sumlin. In 2001, Perkins performed at the Chicago Blues Festival with Ike Turner. Turner credited Perkins with inspiring him to play piano.

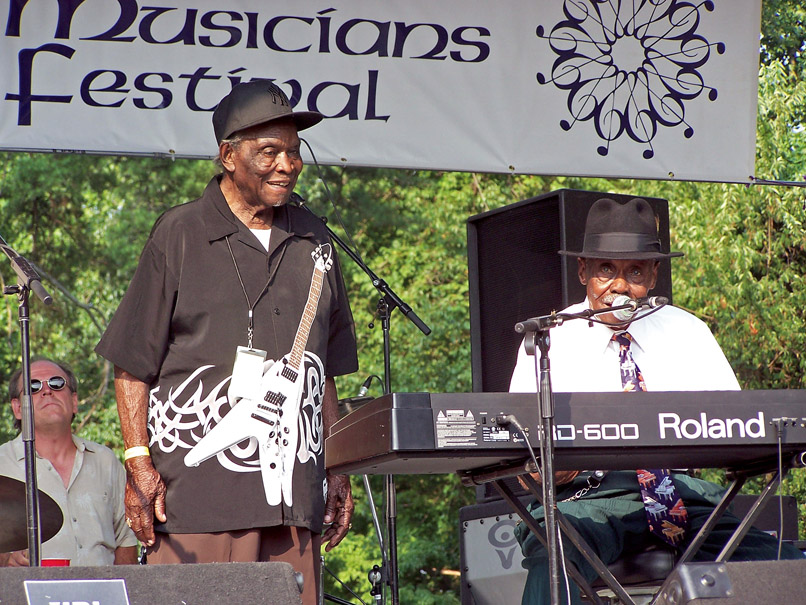
Perkins with the other final living Delta blues musician, David "Honeyboy" Edwards, in 2008

Perkins was driving his automobile in 2004 in La Porte, Indiana, when his car was hit by a train. The car was wrecked, but the 91-year-old driver was not seriously hurt. Until his death, Perkins lived in Austin, Texas. He usually performed a couple of nights a week at Momo's, on Sixth Street.

The song "Hey Mr. Pinetop Perkins", performed by Perkins and Angela Strehli, played on the common misconception that he wrote "Pinetop's Boogie Woogie":

Hey Mr. Pinetop Perkins
I got a question for you
How'd you write that first boogie woogie
The one they named after you

As he aged, Perkins's hearing declined.

=== Death ===
On March 21, 2011, Perkins died in his sleep of cardiac arrest at his home in Austin, Texas at the age of 97. Multiple memorial services were held in Perkins's honor in cities throughout the United States. The Ground Zero Blues Club in Clarksdale, Mississippi held a dedicated jam on March 31, 2011, for friends and fans of Perkins. A music-filled open-casket funeral for Perkins was held in Austin, Texas on March 29, 2011, and was attended by several fellow musicians including Willie "Big Eyes" Smith and Bob Margolin.

Perkins was laid to rest in the McLaurin Memorial Garden cemetery in Clarksdale on April 2, 2011, following a final open-casket "homegoing" celebration. The final laying to rest was ministered by Henry Espy, the first Black mayor of Clarksdale, and the altar display included Perkins's favorite meal: a McDonald's Big Mac and apple pie.

At the time of his death, he had more than 20 performances booked for 2011. Shortly before he died, while discussing his late career resurgence with an interviewer, he conceded, "I can't play piano like I used to either. I used to have bass rolling like thunder. I can't do that no more. But I ask the Lord, please forgive me for the stuff I done trying to make a nickel." Perkins and David "Honeyboy" Edwards were the last surviving original Delta blues musicians. Perkins was also one of the last surviving bluesmen to have known Robert Johnson.

== Legacy ==
=== Influence ===
Bruce Iglauer, founder of Chicago's Alligator Records, stated Perkins was "absolutely the premier blues piano player." He added, "His career spanned literally over 80 years. He was the symbol of a whole generation of musicians." Perkins influenced blues musicians such as Ike Turner, who he taught how to play piano. "Pinetop would be the birth of rock 'n' roll, because he taught me what I played," Turner said. Perkins collaborated with various bluesmen, including Muddy Waters, Robert Nighthawk, Earl Hooker, and B.B. King.

==== Pinetop Perkins Foundation ====
In the late musician's honor, the Pinetop Perkins Foundation holds annual workshops for young musicians interested in Blues and Jazz music. The workshop, which usually occurs in Clarksdale, Mississippi but was made virtual during the COVID-19 pandemic, provides young musicians master classes with some of the best living talent in the traditional Blues and Jazz genres, and culminates in a performance at the Ground Zero Blues Club by the students. The other arm of the foundation provides financial relief to aging musicians through a program called the Pinetop Assistance League; with a goal of ensuring that elderly musicians who can no longer earn an income can pay their housing and medical costs in order to have comfort and dignity in their later years.

=== Awards and honors ===
Perkins was named a National Heritage Fellow by the National Endowment for the Arts in 2000.

In 2003, Perkins was inducted into the Blues Hall of Fame.

In 2005, Perkins received a Grammy Lifetime Achievement Award.

In 2008, Perkins, together with Henry Townsend, Robert Lockwood, Jr. and David "Honeyboy" Edwards, received a Grammy Award for Best Traditional Blues Album for Last of the Great Mississippi Delta Bluesmen: Live in Dallas. He was also nominated in the same category for his solo album Pinetop Perkins on the 88's: Live in Chicago.

At the age of 97, Perkins won a Grammy Award in the category Best Traditional Blues Album for Joined at the Hip, which he recorded with Willie "Big Eyes" Smith, thus becoming the oldest winner of a Grammy Award, edging out the comedian George Burns, who had won in the spoken word category 21 years earlier.

== Documentaries ==
Perkins has been the subject of two documentary films: Born in the Honey (2007) and Sidemen: Long Road to Glory (2016). He also appeared in Clint Eastwood's 2003 documentary Piano Blues.

== Selected discography ==
- 1976: Boogie Woogie King, recorded 1976, released 1992
- 1988: After Hours
- 1992: Pinetop Perkins with the Blue Ice Band
- 1992: On Top
- 1993: Portrait of a Delta Bluesman
- 1995: Live Top, with the Blue Flames
- 1996: Eye to Eye, with Ronnie Earl, Willie "Big Eyes" Smith and Calvin "Fuzz" Jones
- 1997: Born in the Delta
- 1998: Sweet Black Angel
- 1998: Legends, with Hubert Sumlin
- 1998: Down in Mississippi
- 1999: Live at 85!, with George Kilby Jr
- 2000: Back on Top
- 2003: Heritage of the Blues: The Complete Hightone Sessions
- 2003: All Star Blues Jam, with Bob Margolin and others
- 2003: 8 Hands on 88 Keys: Chicago Blues Piano Masters
- 2004: Ladies Man
- 2007: 10 Days Out: Blues from the Backroads, with Kenny Wayne Shepherd and the Muddy Waters Band, recorded live
- 2007: Breakin' It Up, Breakin' It Down – with Muddy Waters, Johnny Winter, and James Cotton
- 2008: Pinetop Perkins and Friends
- 2010: Joined at the Hip, with Willie "Big Eyes" Smith
- 2012: Heaven, with Willie "Big Eyes" Smith on one track and liner notes by Justin O'Brien
- 2015: Genuine Blues Legends, Pinetop Perkins and Jimmy Rogers with Little Mike and the Tornadoes

With Carey Bell

- Carey Bell's Blues Harp (Delmark, 1969)
- Last Night (BluesWay, 1973)

With Earl Hooker

- 2 Bugs and a Roach (Arhoolie, 1969)

With Muddy Waters

- Live at Mr. Kelly's (Chess, 1971)
- Can't Get No Grindin' (Chess, 1973)
- "Unk" in Funk (Chess, 1974)
- The Muddy Waters Woodstock Album (Chess, 1975)
- Hard Again (Blue Sky, 1977)

== See also ==
- Blues Hall of Fame
- List of blues musicians
- List of boogie woogie musicians
- List of Chicago blues musicians
- Chicago Blues Festival
- Long Beach Blues Festival
- Kentuckiana Blues Society
