= Earl Hooker =

American blues guitarist (1930–1970)

- Hooker c. 1960s

Background information
- Born: Earl Zebedee Hooker; January 15, 1930; Quitman County, Mississippi, U.S.
- Died: April 21, 1970 (aged 40) Chicago, Illinois, U.S.
- Genre: Blues
- Occupation: Musician
- Instruments: Guitar; vocals
- Years active: 1940s–1970
- Labels: Cuca; Chief; Arhoolie; Bluesway

Earl Zebedee Hooker (January 15, 1930 – April 21, 1970) was a Chicago blues guitarist known for his slide guitar playing. Considered a "musician's musician", he performed with blues artists such as Sonny Boy Williamson II, Junior Wells, and John Lee Hooker and fronted his own bands. An early player of the electric guitar, Hooker was influenced by the modern urban styles of T-Bone Walker and Robert Nighthawk. He recorded several singles and albums as a bandleader and with other well-known artists. His "Blue Guitar", a slide guitar instrumental single, was popular in the Chicago area and was later overdubbed with vocals by Muddy Waters as "You Shook Me".

In the late 1960s, Hooker began performing on the college and concert circuit and had several recording contracts. Just as his career was on an upswing, he died in 1970, at age 40, after a lifelong struggle with tuberculosis. His guitar playing has been acknowledged by many of his peers, including B. B. King, who commented, "to me he is the best of modern guitarists. Period. With the slide he was the best. It was nobody else like him, he was just one of a kind".

== Early life ==
Hooker was born in rural Quitman County, Mississippi, outside of Clarksdale. In 1930, his parents moved the family to Chicago, during the Great Migration of blacks out of the rural South in the early 20th century.

His family was musically inclined (John Lee Hooker was a cousin on his father side and Joe Hinton on his mother side), and Earl heard music played at home at an early age. About age ten, he started playing the guitar. He was self-taught and picked up what he could from those around him. He developed proficiency on the guitar but showed no interest in singing. He had pronounced stuttering, which afflicted him all his life. Hooker contracted tuberculosis when he was young. The disease did not become critical until the mid-1950s, but it required periodic hospitalizations which began at an early age.

By 1942, when he was 12, Hooker was performing on Chicago street corners with childhood friends, including Bo Diddley. From the beginning, the blues was Hooker's favorite music. In this period, country-influenced blues was giving way to swing-influenced and jump blues styles, which often featured the electric guitar. In 1942, the popular guitarist T-Bone Walker began a three-month stint at the Rhumboogie Club in Chicago. He had considerable impact on Hooker, with both his playing and his showmanship. Walker's swing-influenced blues guitar, including "the jazzy way he would sometimes run the blues scales" and intricate chording, appealed to Hooker. Walker's stage dynamics, which included playing the guitar behind his neck and with his teeth, influenced Hooker's later stage act.

Around this time, Hooker became friends with Robert Nighthawk, one of the first guitarists in Chicago to play the electric guitar. Nighthawk taught Hooker slide guitar techniques, including various tunings and his highly articulated approach, and was a lasting influence on Hooker's playing. Also around this time, Hooker met Junior Wells, another important figure in his career. The two were frequent street performers, and sometimes, to avoid foul weather (or truancy officers), they played in streetcars, riding from one line to another across Chicago.

== Early career and recordings ==
Around 1946, Hooker traveled to Helena, Arkansas, where he performed with Robert Nighthawk. When he was not booked with Nighthawk, he performed with Sonny Boy Williamson II, sometimes on Williamson's popular radio program, King Biscuit Time, on station KFFA, in Helena. Hooker toured the South as a member of Nighthawk's band for the next couple of years. This was his introduction to life as an itinerant blues musician (although he had earlier run away from home and spent time in the Mississippi Delta). In 1949, Hooker tried to establish himself in the music scene in Memphis, Tennessee, but was soon back on the road, fronting his own band. By the early 1950s he had returned to Chicago and was performing regularly in clubs. This set the pattern that he repeated for most of his life: extensive touring with various musicians interspersed with establishing himself in various cities before returning to the Chicago club scene. During this time, he formed a band with the blues drummer and vocalist Kansas City Red.

In 1952, Hooker began recording for several independent record companies. His early singles were often credited to the vocalist he recorded with, although some instrumentals (and his occasional vocal) were issued in Hooker's name. Songs by Hooker and blues and R&B artists, including Johnny O'Neal, Little Sam Davis, Boyd Gilmore, Pinetop Perkins, the Dells, Arbee Stidham, Lorenzo Smith, and Harold Tidwell, were recorded for King, Rockin', Sun, Argo, Vee-Jay, States, United, and C.J. (several of these recordings, including all of the Sun sessions, were unissued at the time). The harmonica player Little Arthur Duncan often accompanied Hooker during this period.

Among these early singles was Hooker's first recorded vocal performance, an interpretation of the blues classic "Black Angel Blues". His vocals were more than adequate but lacked the power usually associated with blues singers. Hooker's "Sweet Angel" (1953, Rockin' 513) was based on Nighthawk's "Black Angel Blues" (1949) and showed that "Hooker had by now transcended his teacher". (B. B. King later had a hit with his interpretation, "Sweet Little Angel", in 1956.) One of Hooker's most successful singles during this period was "Frog Hop", recorded in 1956 (Argo 5265), an upbeat instrumental in which the influence of T-Bone Walker's swing blues and chording techniques can be heard, but Hooker's own style is also apparent.

== Chief, Profile, and Age recordings ==
Despite a major attack of tuberculosis in 1956, which required hospitalization, Hooker returned to performing in Chicago clubs and touring the South. By late 1959, Junior Wells had brought Hooker to the Chief–Profile–Age group of labels, with which he began one of the most fruitful periods of his recording career. Their first recording together, "Little by Little" (Profile 4011), was a hit the following year, reaching number 23 on the Billboard Hot R&B Sides chart. With this success and his rapport with Chief owner and producer Mel London, Hooker became Chief's house guitarist. From 1959 to 1963, he appeared on about forty Chief recordings, including singles for Wells, Lillian Offitt, Magic Sam, A.C. Reed, Ricky Allen, Reggie "Guitar" Boyd, Johnny "Big Moose" Walker, and Jackie Brenston, as well as singles on which Hooker was the featured artist. He performed for nearly all of Wells's releases, including "Come On in This House", "Messin' with the Kid", and "It Hurts Me Too", which remained in Wells's repertoire for the rest of his career. Hooker regularly performed with Wells for the latter part of 1960 and most of 1961.

Hooker released several instrumentals for the Chief labels, including the slow blues "Calling All Blues" (Chief 7020) in 1960, which featured his slide guitar playing, and "Blues in D Natural" (Chief 7016), also in 1960, in which he switched between fretted and slide guitar. A chance taping before a recording session captured perhaps Hooker's best-known composition (although by a different title). During the warm-up preceding a session in May 1961, Hooker and his band played an impromptu slow blues featuring his slide guitar. The tune was played once, and Hooker was apparently not aware that it was being recorded. Producer Mel London saved the tape and, when looking for material to release the following spring, issued it as "Blue Guitar" (Age 29106). "Earl's song sold unusually well for an instrumental blues side", and Chicago-area bluesmen included it in their sets.

Sensing greater commercial potential for Hooker's "Blue Guitar", Leonard Chess approached London about using it for the next Muddy Waters record. An agreement was reached, and in July 1962 Waters overdubbed a vocal (with lyrics by Willie Dixon) on Hooker's single. The song, renamed "You Shook Me", was successful, and Chess hired Hooker to record three more instrumentals for Waters to overdub. One of the songs, "You Need Love", again with lyrics by Dixon, was also a success and "sold better than Muddy's early sixties recordings". The rock band Led Zeppelin later achieved greater success with their adaptations of Hooker's and Waters's "You Shook Me" and "You Need Love".

During his time with Chief, Hooker recorded singles as a sideman for Bobby Saxton and Betty Everett and in his own name for the Bea & Baby, C.J., and Checker labels. By 1964, the last of the Chief labels went out of business, ending his longest association with a record label. For some, his recordings for the Chief–Profile–Age group are his best work.

== Cuca and Arhoolie recordings ==
Hooker continued touring and began recording for Cuca Records, Jim-Ko, C.J., Duplex, and Globe. Several songs recorded for Cuca between 1964 and 1967 were released on his first album, The Genius of Earl Hooker. The album was composed of instrumentals, including the slow blues "The End of the Blues" and some tunes incorporating recent popular music trends, such as the early funk-influenced "Two Bugs in a Rug" (an allusion to his tuberculosis, or TB). Hooker experienced a major tuberculosis attack in late summer 1967 and was hospitalized for nearly a year.

When Hooker was released from the hospital in 1968, he assembled a new band and began performing in Chicago clubs and touring, against his doctor's advice. The band, with the pianist Pinetop Perkins, the harmonica player Carey Bell, the bassist Geno Skaggs, the vocalist Andrew Odom, and the steel guitar player Freddie Roulette, was "widely acclaimed" and "considered one of the best Earl had ever carried with him". On the basis of a recommendation from Buddy Guy, Arhoolie Records recorded an album, Two Bugs and a Roach, by Hooker and his new band. The album, released in the spring of 1969, included a mix of instrumentals and songs with vocals by Odom, Bell, and Hooker. For one of his vocals, Hooker chose "Anna Lee", a song based on Robert Nighthawk's "Annie Lee Blues" (1949). As he had done earlier with "Sweet Angel", Hooker acknowledged his mentor's influence but went beyond Nighthawk's version to create his own interpretation. The "brilliant bebop[-influenced]" instrumental "Off the Hook" showed his jazz leanings. Two Bugs and a Roach was "extremely well-received by critics and the public" and "stands today as [part of] Hooker's finest musical legacy."

== Blue Thumb and Bluesway recordings ==
The year 1969 was an important one in Hooker's career. He again teamed with Junior Wells, performing at higher-paying college dates and concerts, including Chicago's Kinetic Playground. This pairing did not last long, and in May 1969, after assembling new players, Hooker recorded material that was later released as Funk: Last of the Late Great Earl Hooker. Also in May, after being recommended by Ike Turner (with whom he first toured in 1952), Hooker went to Los Angeles to record the album Sweet Black Angel for Blue Thumb Records, with arrangements and piano accompaniment by Turner. The album included Hooker's interpretations of several blues standards, such as "Sweet Home Chicago" (with Hooker on vocal), "Drivin' Wheel", "Cross Cut Saw", "Catfish Blues", and the title track. While in Los Angeles, Hooker visited clubs and sat in with Albert Collins at the Ash Grove several times and jammed with others, including Jimi Hendrix.

After the Blue Thumb recording session, Hooker and his band backed his cousin John Lee Hooker on a series of club dates in California, after which John Lee used them for a recording session for Bluesway Records. The resulting album, John Lee Hooker Featuring Earl Hooker – If You Miss 'Im ... I Got 'Im, was Earl Hooker's introduction to the Bluesway label, a subsidiary of ABC and home to B. B. King. He recorded six more albums for Bluesway in 1969: his own Don't Have to Worry and albums by Andrew Odom, Johnny "Big Moose" Walker, Charles Brown, Jimmy Witherspoon, and Brownie McGhee and Sonny Terry.

Hooker's Don't Have to Worry included vocal performances by him and by Walker and Odom, along with instrumental selections. The session had a "coherence and consistency" that helped to make the album another part of Hooker's "finest musical legacy". Touring with his band in California took Hooker to the San Francisco Bay area in July 1969, where he played club and college dates and rock venues, such as The Matrix and the Fillmore West. In Berkeley, he and his band, billed as Earl Hooker and His Chicago Blues Band, performed at a club, Mandrake's, for two weeks as he recorded a second album for Arhoolie. The album, Hooker and Steve, was recorded with Louis Myers on harmonica, Steve Miller on keyboards, Geno Skaggs on bass, and Bobby Robinson on drums. Hooker shared the vocals with Miller and Skaggs.

== Last performances ==
Hooker's grave at Restvale Cemetery

After his California sojourn, Hooker returned to Chicago and performed regularly around the city. He appeared at the first Chicago Blues Festival on August 30, 1969, which attracted about 10,000 people. In October 1969, Hooker toured Europe as part of the American Folk Blues Festival, playing twenty concerts in twenty-three days in nine countries. His sets were well received and garnered favorable reviews. "The journey overseas was a sort of apotheosis for Hooker, who regarded it, along with his recording trips to California, as the climax of his career." The tour exhausted him, and "his friends noticed a severe deterioration of his health upon his return." Hooker played a few dates around Chicago (including some with Junior Wells) from November to early December 1969, after which he was hospitalized.

Hooker died on April 21, 1970, at age 40, of complications due to tuberculosis. He is interred in Restvale Cemetery, in the Chicago suburb of Alsip.

== Playing style and recognition ==
Unlike his contemporaries Elmore James and Muddy Waters, Hooker used standard tuning on his guitar for slide playing. He used a short steel slide, which allowed him to switch between slide and fretted playing during a song with greater ease. Part of his slide sound has been attributed to his light touch, a technique he learned from Robert Nighthawk. "Instead of using full-chord glissando effects, he preferred the more subtle single-note runs inherited from others who played slide in standard tuning, [such as] Tampa Red, Houston Stackhouse, and his mentor Robert Nighthawk." In addition to his mastery of slide guitar, Hooker was also a highly developed standard-guitar soloist and rhythm player. At a time when many blues guitarists were emulating B. B. King, Hooker maintained his own course. Although he was a bluesman at heart, he was adept at several musical styles, which he incorporated into his playing as it suited him. Depending on his mood and audience reaction, a Hooker performance could include blues, boogie-woogie, R&B, soul, be-bop, pop, and even a country-western favorite.

Hooker was a flamboyant showman in the style of T-Bone Walker and predated others with a similar approach, such as Guitar Slim and Johnny "Guitar" Watson. He wore flashy clothes and picked the guitar with his teeth or his feet or played it behind his neck or between his legs. He also played a double-neck guitar, at first a six-string guitar and four-string bass combination and later a twelve- and six-string combination. After his 1967 tuberculosis attack left him weakened, he sometimes played while seated and used a lighter single-neck guitar. In a genre that typically shunned gadgetry, Hooker was an exception. He experimented with amplification and used echo and tape delay, including "double-tracking his playing during a song, [so] he could pick simultaneously two solos in harmony". He began using a wah-wah pedal in 1968 to add a vocal-like quality to some of his solos.

Hooker did not receive as much public recognition as some of his contemporaries, but he was highly regarded by musicians. Many consider him among the greatest modern blues guitarists, including Wayne Bennett, Bobby "Blue" Bland, Albert Collins, Willie Dixon, Ronnie Earl, Tinsley Ellis, Guitar Shorty, Buddy Guy, John Lee Hooker, Albert King, B. B. King, Little Milton, Louis Myers, Lucky Peterson, Otis Rush, Joe Louis Walker, and Junior Wells. In 2013, Hooker was inducted to the Blues Hall of Fame, which noted that "Earl Hooker was the 'blues guitarists' guitarist,' the most respected six-string wizard in Chicago blues musicians' circles during the 1950s and '60s."

== Partial album discography ==
The following lists the albums Hooker released during his career and currently available compilations.

Year	Title	Label	Comments
1968	The Genius of Earl Hooker	Cuca	Recorded in Sauk City, Wisconsin, 1964–67
1969	2 Bugs and a Roach	Arhoolie	Recorded in Chicago, 1968
1969	Sweet Black Angel	Blue Thumb	Recorded in Los Angeles, 1969
1969	Don't Have to Worry	BluesWay	Recorded in Los Angeles, 1969
1970	If You Miss 'Im...I Got 'Im	BluesWay	with John Lee Hooker; Recorded in Los Angeles, 1969
1970	Hooker and Steve	Arhoolie	Recorded in Berkeley, 1969
1972	Funk: The Last of the Great Earl Hooker	Blues on Blues	Recorded in Chicago, 1969
1972	His First and Last Recordings	Arhoolie	Sun, and Arhoolie recordings, 1953 and 1968–69
1972	There's a Fungus Amung Us	Red Lightning	Cuca recordings, 1964–67 (reissue of the 1968 album The Genius of Earl Hooker)
1973	I Couldn't Believe My Eyes	BluesWay	With Brownie McGhee and Sonny Terry; Recorded in Los Angeles, 1969
1985	Play Your Guitar, Mr. Hooker!	Black Magic	Cuca recordings, 1964–68
1993	Play Your Guitar, Mr. Hooker!	Black Top	Cuca recordings, 1964–68 (reissue of the 1985 album on Black Magic)
1998	The Moon Is Rising	Arhoolie	Arhoolie, live recordings, 1968–69
1999	Simply the Best: Earl Hooker Collection	MCA	Chess, Blue Thumb, and BluesWay recordings, 1956–69
2003	Blue Guitar: The Chief and Age Sessions 1959–63	P-Vine	Chief, Age, and Profile recordings, 1959–63
2006	An Introduction to Earl Hooker	Fuel 2000	Chief, and Age recordings, 1959–62
2020	Rockin' Wild: 1952–1963 Recordings	Soul Jam	Chief, Age, Argo, King, Mel-Lon, Profile, and USA recordings, 1952–63
