= It Hurts Me Too =

Blues standard first recorded by Tampa Red

Single by Tampa Red
- B-side: "Tired of Your Reckless Ways"
- Released: 1940
- Recorded: May 10, 1940
- Studio: Chicago
- Genre: Blues
- Length: 2:28
- Label: Bluebird
- Songwriter(s): Unknown

"It Hurts Me Too" is a blues standard, regarded as one of the most interpreted songs in the genre. First recorded in 1940 by Tampa Red, the song is a mid-tempo eight-bar blues that features slide guitar. It borrows from earlier blues songs and has been recorded by many artists.

== Origins ==
"It Hurts Me Too" is based on "Things 'Bout Comin' My Way", the latter recorded by Tampa Red in February 1931. The melody lines are nearly identical and instrumentally they are similar, although the latter has an extra bar in the turnaround, giving it nine bars. "Sam Hill from Louisville", one of several pseudonyms of Walter Vinson (or Vincson), recorded "Things 'Bout Coming My Way" in 1931 shortly before Tampa Red. Vinson's version is based on his 1930 recording with the Mississippi Sheiks, "Sitting on Top of the World". Both songs share several elements with "You Got to Reap What You Sow", recorded by Tampa Red in 1929 and by Leroy Carr and Scrapper Blackwell in 1928. The melody lines, played on slide guitar by Tampa Red and sung by Carr, are similar to those in the later songs. Carr and Blackwell's song has elements of their own earlier 1928 song "How Long, How Long Blues". "How Long, How Long Blues" has been described as one of the first blues standards and the inspiration for many blues songs of the era.

In March 1949, Tampa Red recorded a variation of "It Hurts Me Too", titled "When Things Go Wrong with You". It was recast in the style of a Chicago blues, with electric guitar and a more up to date backing arrangement. The song was a hit and reached number nine on Billboard's Rhythm & Blues Records chart in 1949. (The original "It Hurts Me Too" was released before Billboard or a similar reliable service began tracking such releases, so it is difficult to gauge which version was more popular, although the former's title won out over the latter's). Although the song retained the refrain "When things go wrong, so wrong with you, it hurts me too", Tampa Red varied the rest of the lyrics somewhat. This would become the pattern for future versions, in which succeeding artists would interpret the song with some of their own lyrics.

== Elmore James renditions ==
Several versions of "It Hurts Me Too" were recorded in the 1940s and 1950s, including those by Stick McGhee and Big Bill Broonzy. When Elmore James recorded it in 1957, he (or Chief's owner, Mel London, who is credited on the release) supplied some of the lyrics that are most familiar today:

You say you hurting, you almost lost your mind
The man you love, he hurts you all the time
When things go wrong, go wrong with you
It hurts me too

James' 1957 Chief version did not appear in the charts, but after he recorded the song again in late 1962 or early 1963 for the Fire/Fury/Enjoy group of labels, it became a hit. The song used the same lyrics as his earlier version, but featured more prominent slide guitar work. When it was released in 1965, two years after James' death, "It Hurts Me Too" spent eight weeks on the Hot Rhythm & Blues Singles chart, where it reached number 25. The song also appeared on Billboard's Bubbling Under Hot 100 Singles chart at number 106, which was James' only single to do so. Subsequent versions of "It Hurts Me Too" often showed Elmore James' influences, either in the lyrics or guitar parts.

== Junior Wells versions ==
Junior Wells made the song one of his standards and often used James' lyrics. He recorded it several times, including as a single in 1962, for the 1966 compilation album Chicago/The Blues/Today! Volume 1, and in 1979 for his Pleading the Blues album with Buddy Guy.

== Grateful Dead versions ==
The Grateful Dead began covering "It Hurts Me Too" in 1966, with Ron "Pigpen" McKernan singing the lead vocal. A live recording appeared on the album Europe '72. It was retired after McKernan left the group in 1972.

== Recognition and influence ==
In 2012, Tampa Red's 1940 "It Hurts Me Too" was inducted into the Blues Foundation Hall of Fame as a "Classic of Blues Recording". The Foundation noted: "Tampa Red proved himself a master of many moods during his long recording career, and with the classic line 'When things go wrong, go wrong with you, it hurts me too,' he showed how the blues can be an expression of empathy and tenderness."
