= Lowell Fulson =

American blues guitarist and songwriter (1921–1999)

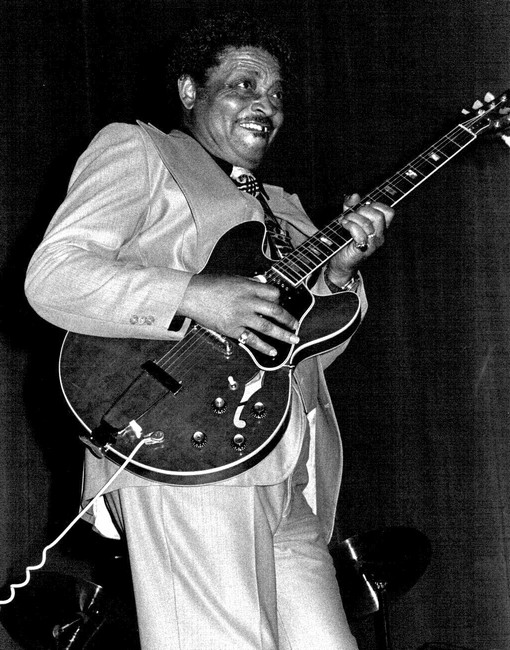
- Performing in Paris in 1980

Background information
- Born: March 31, 1921; Atoka, Oklahoma, U.S.
- Died: March 7, 1999 (aged 77) Long Beach, California, U.S.
- Genres: West Coast blues; soul blues
- Occupations: Musician; singer; songwriter
- Instruments: Guitar; vocals
- Years active: 1940s–1999
- Labels: Swing Time; Checker; Kent; Rounder

Lowell Fulson (March 31, 1921 – March 7, 1999) was an American blues guitarist and songwriter, in the West Coast blues tradition. He also recorded for contractual reasons as Lowell Fullsom and Lowell Fulsom. After T-Bone Walker, he was the most important figure in West Coast blues in the 1940s and 1950s.

== Early life ==
Fulson was born on a Choctaw reservation in Atoka, Oklahoma, to Mamie and Martin Fulson. He stated that he was of Cherokee ancestry through his father but also claimed Choctaw ancestry. His father was killed when Lowell was a child, and a few years later, he moved with his mother and brothers to live in Clarita and attended school at Coalgate.

== Career ==
At the age of eighteen, he moved to Ada, Oklahoma, and joined Alger "Texas" Alexander for a few months in 1940, but later moved to California, where he formed a band which soon included a young Ray Charles and the tenor saxophone player Stanley Turrentine. Fulson was drafted in 1943 and served in the U.S. Navy until 1945.

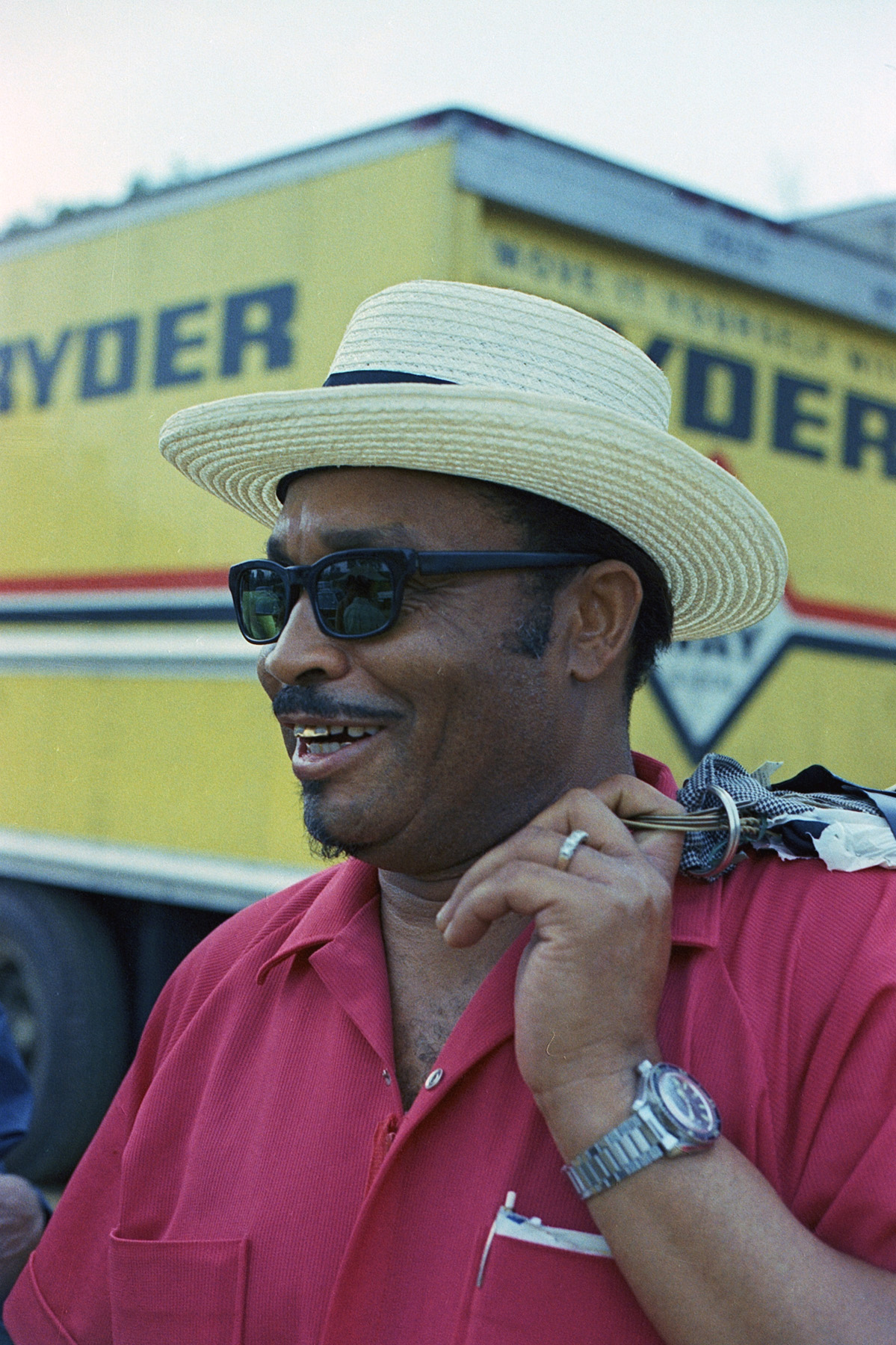
Lowell Fulson at the 1970 Ann Arbor (Mich.) Blues Festival.

Fulson recorded for Swing Time Records in the 1940s, Chess Records (on the Checker label) in the 1950s, Kent Records in the 1960s, and Rounder Records (on Bullseye Blues) in the 1980s/1990s. He wrote "3 O'Clock Blues" (B.B. King's first hit), "Reconsider Baby" (a blues standard), and "Tramp" (co-written with Jimmy McCracklin and recorded by several artists). His 1965 song "Black Nights" was his first hit in a decade, and "Tramp" did even better, restoring him to R&B stardom. In 1966 his brother Robert Fulson married former member of The Raelettes Margie Hendrix and they both started performing live with Lowell before they divorced in 1968.

A show entitled California Blues: Swingtime Tribute opened in 1993 at the Paramount Theatre in Oakland, California, with Fulson, Johnny Otis, Charles Brown, Jay McShann, Jimmy Witherspoon, Jimmy McCracklin and Earl Brown. Fulson's last recording was a duet of "Every Day I Have the Blues" with Jimmy Rogers on the latter's 1999 Atlantic Records release, billed as the Jimmy Rogers All-Stars: Blues Blues Blues.

== Death ==
Fulson died in Long Beach, California, on March 7, 1999, at the age of 77. His companion, Tina Mayfield, said that the causes of death were complications from kidney disease, diabetes, and congestive heart failure. He was the father of four and grandfather of thirteen. Fulson was interred in Inglewood Park Cemetery, in Inglewood, California.

== Awards and recognition ==
- 1993: Induction into the Blues Foundation Hall of Fame
- 1993: Blues Foundation Hall of Fame, Classics of Blues Recording – Singles or Album Tracks, for "Reconsider Baby"
- 1993: Blues Foundation Blues Music Award, Traditional Album of the Year, for Hold On
- 1993: Rhythm and Blues Foundation, Pioneer Award
- 1995: Grammy Awards, nomination as Best Traditional Blues Album of the Year, for Them Update Blues
- 1995: Rock and Roll Hall of Fame, "Reconsider Baby" included in the "500 Songs That Shaped Rock and Roll"
- 2010: Blues Foundation Hall of Fame, Classics of Blues Recording – Albums, for Hung Down Head

== Partial discography ==
=== Charting singles ===
| Year | Title | Label | R&B Chart no. |
|---|---|---|---|
| 1948 | "Three O'Clock Blues" (re-released as "Three O'Clock In The Morning" on Down Beat) | Down Town | 6 |
| 1949 | "Come Back Baby" | Down Beat | 13 |
| 1950 | "Every Day I Have the Blues" | Swing Time | 3 |
| 1950 | "Blue Shadows" / | Swing Time | 1 |
| 1950 | "Low Society Blues" | Swing Time | 8 |
| 1950 | "Lonesome Christmas (Parts I & II)" | Swing Time | 7 |
| 1951 | "I'm a Night Owl (Parts I & II)" | Swing Time | 10 |
| 1954 | "Reconsider Baby" | Checker | 3 |
| 1955 | "Loving You (Is All I Crave)" | Checker | 14 |
| 1965 | "Black Nights" | Kent | 11 |
| 1967 | "Tramp" | Kent | 5 |
| 1967 | "Make a Little Love" | Kent | 20 |
| 1967 | "I'm a Drifter" | Kent | 38 |
| 1976 | "Do You Love Me" | Granite | 78 |

=== Selected albums ===
| Year | Title | Label |
|---|---|---|
| 1962 | Lowell Fulson | Arhoolie |
| 1965 | Soul | Kent |
| 1967 | Tramp | Kent |
| 1968 | Now! | Kent |
| 1970 | Hung Down Head | Chess |
| 1971 | In a Heavy Bag | Jewel |
| 1973 | I've Got the Blues | Jewel |
| 1975 | Lowell Fulson (Early Recordings) | Arhoolie |
| 1976 | The Ol' Blues Singer | Granite |
| 1976 | Lowell Fulson (Chess Blues Masters) | Chess |
| 1978 | Lovemaker | Big Town |
| 1981 | Blue Shadows (with Powder Blues) | Stony Plain |
| 1984 | One More Blues | Black & Blue |
| 1984 | Think Twice Before You Speak | JSP |
| 1988 | San Francisco Blues | Black Lion |
| 1988 | It's a Good Day | Rounder |
| 1991 | Back Home Blues | Night Train International |
| 1992 | Hold On | Bullseye Blues/Rounder |
| 1994 | Every Day I Have the Blues | Night Train International |
| 1995 | Sinner's Prayer | Night Train International |
| 1995 | Them Update Blues | Bullseye Blues/Rounder |
| 1996 | Mean Old Lonesome Blues | Night Train International |
| 1997 | The Complete Chess Masters (50th Anniversary Collection) | Chess/MCA |
| 2001 | I've Got the Blues (... and Then Some) (complete Jewel recordings) | Westside [UK] |
| 2002 | The Complete Kent Recordings 1964–1968 | P-Vine |
| 2004 | Classic Cuts 1946–1953, (Vols. 1–4) (Fulson's complete Big Town, Trilon, Down Beat/Swing Beat/Swing Time recordings) | JSP |
| 2004 | A Proper Introduction To Lowell Fulson: Juke Box Shuffle | Proper |

With John Lee Hooker

- I Feel Good! (Carson, 1970; reissue: Jewel, 1971)
- I Wanna Dance All Night (America, 1970)
