= Ricky Allen =

American blues singer (1935–2005)

Richard A. Allen (January 6, 1935 – May 29, 2005) was an American blues singer from Chicago.

== Background ==
He was born in Nashville, Tennessee, and began his singing career as a member of a church choir in his home town. He relocated to Chicago in 1960, and received a recording contract one year later at Age Records. He had a local hit with "You Better Be Sure" and, in 1963, his hit "Cut You A-Loose" reached Number 20 in Billboard's R&B chart. Some of his recordings of the 1960s, such as "It's A Mess I Tell You" and "I Can't Stand No Signifying", portended the emerging soul-blues style of the 1970s.

== Career ==
Allen recorded "I Ain't Never" bw "Hurt Look on My Face", which was released on USA 858 in 1966. It was a Billboard R&B Spotlight Chart record for the week of 17 December.

== Later years ==
After his retirement from the music industry in the early 1970s, he ran a laundry and a limousine service.

In 2001, he performed at the Mönsterås Festival in Sweden, and the following year at the Chicago Blues Festival. He died in 2005, aged 70.
