= Pinetop's Boogie Woogie =

Single by Clarence "Pinetop" Smith
- Released: March 1, 1929
- Recorded: December 29, 1928
- Genre: Boogie-woogie
- Length: 3:08
- Label: Vocalion
- Songwriter: Pine Top Smith

"Pinetop's Boogie Woogie" is a blues song initially recorded by Clarence "Pinetop" Smith on December 29, 1928, in Chicago, Illinois, and released by Vocalion Records on March 1, 1929. It is the first known recording of a song with "Boogie" in the title.

== Recordings ==
=== First ===
This recording was made in 1928, and its lyrics are exclusively instructions to dancers in the audience, as was traditional at the time. Musically, it is strikingly similar to the previous year's hit, "Honky Tonk Train Blues", by Meade Lux Lewis, which like "Pinetop's Boogie Woogie" went on to become a standard recorded many times by many artists. This may not be a coincidence, as around that time Lewis and Smith lived in the same boarding house.

=== Later ===
This song became a standard recorded by many other artists. Most noteworthy may be the 1953 version of Joe Perkins, who became so famous for it that he acquired the nickname Pinetop Perkins.

Other versions were recorded by: Tommy Dorsey (1938), Blind Willie McTell (1949), and Louis Jordan (1950). In 1946 Lionel Hampton recorded a rare version that actually included Pinetop's original instructions, of which he would record the original version again with Bing Crosby in 1951. Meade Lux Lewis also recorded the song in 1951, ironic given his influence on Pinetop's original version 23 years earlier. Memphis Slim also recorded a version in 1960, backed by Willie Dixon, and Armand "Jump" Jackson. While playing the tune live in 1962, the announcer credited Pinetop as "the creator of rock and roll".

Jimmy Wakely recorded a song called "Pine Top's Boogie" in 1955, that was essentially a song about the song itself. This, too, was repeatedly covered, as by Jo Stafford in 1959.
