= Pinetop Smith =

American boogie-woogie pianist (1904-1929)

- Born: Clarence Smith; June 11, 1904; Pike County, Alabama, U.S.
- Died: March 15, 1929 (aged 24) Chicago, Illinois, U.S.
- Genres: Boogie-woogie; blues
- Occupations: Musician; comedian
- Instruments: Piano; vocals
- Years active: c. 1920–1929
- Label: Vocalion

Clarence "Pinetop" Smith (June 11, 1904 – March 15, 1929) was an American boogie-woogie style blues pianist. His hit tune "Pinetop's Boogie Woogie" featured rhythmic "breaks" that were an essential ingredient of ragtime music, but also a fundamental foreshadowing of rock and roll. The song was also the first known use of the term "boogie woogie" on a record, and cemented that term as the moniker for the genre.

== Life and career ==
The son of Sam and Molly Smith, Clarence "Pinetop" Smith was born on June 11, 1904, in Pike County, Alabama. Sources disagree on the exact place of his birth with some stating he was born in Troy, Alabama and others stating he was born in Orion, Alabama just north of Troy. According to the Encyclopedia of Alabama the Smith family lived in Orion at the time of Clarence's birth and they moved to Troy not long after he was born. He received his nickname of "Pinetop" as a child from his liking for climbing trees. As a teenager he moved with his family to Birmingham, Alabama.

In 1920 he moved to Pittsburgh, Pennsylvania, where he worked as an entertainer before touring on the Theatre Owners Booking Association (T.O.B.A.) vaudeville circuit, performing as a singer and comedian as well as a pianist. For a time, he worked as accompanist for blues singer Ma Rainey and Butterbeans and Susie.

In the mid-1920s, he was recommended by Cow Cow Davenport to J. Mayo Williams at Vocalion Records, and in 1928 he moved, with his wife and young son, to Chicago, Illinois to record. For a time he, Albert Ammons, and Meade Lux Lewis lived in the same rooming house.

On December 29, 1928, he recorded his influential "Pine Top's Boogie Woogie", one of the first "boogie woogie" style recordings to make a hit, and which cemented the name for the style. It was also the first recording to have the phrase 'boogie woogie' in the song's title. Smith talks over the recording, telling how to dance to the number. He said he originated the number at a house-rent party in St. Louis, Missouri. Smith was the first ever to direct "the girl with the red dress on" to "not move a peg" until told to "shake that thing" and "mess around". Similar lyrics are heard in many later songs, including "Mess Around" and "What'd I Say" by Ray Charles.

Smith was scheduled to make another recording session for Vocalion in 1929, but died from a gunshot wound in a dance-hall fight in Chicago the day before the session. Sources differ as to whether he was the intended recipient of the bullet. "I saw Pinetop spit blood" was a headline in DownBeat magazine in 1939.

Smith died in Chicago on March 15, 1929. In 2014 the Killer Blues Headstone Project placed a headstone for him at Restvale Cemetery in Alsip, Illinois.

== 78 rpm singles - Vocalion Records ==
1245	"Pinetop's Blues"	December 29, 1928
1245	"Pinetop's Boogie Woogie"	December 29, 1928
1256	"Big Boy They Can't Do That"	January 15, 1929
1256	"Nobody Knows You When You're Down and Out"	January 15, 1929
1266	"I'm Sober Now"	January 14, 1929
1266	"I Got More Sense Than That"	January 14, 1929
1298	"Jump Steady Blues"	January 15, 1929
1298	"Now I Ain't Got Nothing At All"	January 15, 1929

== Influence ==
Smith was acknowledged by other boogie-woogie pianists such as Albert Ammons and Pete Johnson as a key influence, and he gained posthumous fame when "Boogie Woogie" was arranged for big band and recorded by Tommy Dorsey and His Orchestra in 1938. Although not immediately successful, "Boogie Woogie" was so popular during and after World War II that it became Dorsey's best-selling record, with over five million copies sold. Bing Crosby (recorded January 21, 1946, with Lionel Hampton's Orchestra) and Count Basie also issued their versions of the song.

From the 1950s, Joe Willie Perkins became universally known as "Pinetop Perkins" for his recording of "Pinetop's Boogie Woogie". Perkins later became Muddy Waters's pianist. When he was in his nineties, he recorded a song on his 2004 album Ladies' Man, which played on the by-then common misconception that he had written "Pinetop's Boogie Woogie".

Ray Charles adapted "Pine Top's Boogie Woogie" for his song "Mess Around", for which the authorship was credited to "A. Nugetre", Ahmet Ertegun.

In 1975, the Bob Thiele Orchestra recorded a modern jazz album called I Saw Pinetop Spit Blood, which included a treatment of "Pinetop's Boogie Woogie" as well as the title song.

Gene Taylor recorded a version of "Pinetop's Boogie Woogie" on his eponymous 2003 album.

Claes Oldenburg, the pop artist, proposed a Pinetop Smith Monument in his book Proposals for Monuments and Buildings 1965–69. Oldenburg described the monument as "a wire extending the length of North Avenue, west from Clark Street, along which at intervals runs an electric impulse colored blue so that there's one blue line as far as the eye can see. Pinetop Smith invented boogie woogie blues at the corner of North and Larrabee, where he finally was murdered: the electric wire is 'blue' and dangerous."

== Awards and honors ==
Smith was a posthumous 1991 inductee of the Alabama Jazz Hall of Fame.
