= Harmonica (disambiguation) =

A harmonica, or mouth organ, is a free-reed wind instrument.

Harmonica may also refer to:

== Music ==
=== Classical ===
- Adagio and Rondo for glass harmonica, flute, oboe, viola and cello, composed in 1791 by Wolfgang Amadeus Mozart
- Concerto for Harmonica and Orchestra, composed 1954 by Malcolm Arnold

=== Groups ===
- Cambridge Harmonica Orchestra, formed in 1981 in Cambridge, Massachusetts
- Cappy Barra Harmonica Band, an American harmonica ensemble active circa 1935–1945
- The Harmonica Gentlemen, an American trio active after World War II
- King's College Harmonica Band, formed in 1951 in Hong Kong
- Morton Fraser's Harmonica Gang, a British comedy musical group active circa 1946–1980s

=== Instruments ===
- Chromatic harmonica, a type of harmonica with a button-activated sliding bar
- Glass harmonica, or glass harmonium, a type of friction idiophone
- Richter-tuned harmonica, or blues harp, a common type of harmonica
- Tremolo harmonica, a type of harmonica with two reeds per note

=== Organizations ===
- HarmonicaUK, UK-based, founded in 1935 as the National Harmonica League
- The Society for the Preservation and Advancement of the Harmonica, US-based, founded in 1962

=== Recordings ===
- "Alvin's Harmonica", a 1959 single by Alvin and the Chipmunks
- Harmonica Solos, a 2013 album by George Winston
- "Hey Harmonica Man", a 1964 single by Stevie Wonder
- Man Bites Harmonica!, a 1958 album by Jean "Toots" Thielemans

=== Related items ===
- Asia Pacific Harmonica Festival, held bi-annually since 1996
- Harmonica concerto, a list of such compositions
- Harmonica techniques, a list of such techniques
- Magnus Harmonica Corporation, formed in 1944 in New Jersey as the International Plastic Harmonica Corporation

== Moths ==
- Brenthia harmonica, found in the Philippines
- Didrimys harmonica, found in Sri Lanka, Java, Borneo, and New Guinea
- Glaucocharis harmonica, endemic to New Zealand

== People ==
listed alphabetically by last name

- Terry "Harmonica" Bean (born 1961), American musician born in Mississippi
- Harmonica Fats (1927–2000), American musician born in Louisiana
- Harmonica Frank (1908–1984), American musician born in Mississippi
- Harmonica Hinds (born 1945), Trinidadian-American musician
- Harmonica Shah (born 1946), American musician born in California
- Harmonica Slim (1934–1984), American musician born in Texas
- George "Harmonica" Smith (1924–1983), American musician born in Arkansas

== Other ==
- Elementa harmonica, a treatise on the subject of musical scales by Aristoxenus from the 4th century BC
- Harmonica gun, a type of firearm
- Harmonica house, a type of row house in North Korea
- Harmonica Incident, an event during the New York Yankees' 1964 season
- Tunes for a Small Harmonica, a 1976 novel by Barbara Wersba
