= Harmonica concerto =

Musical work for solo harmonica and ensemble

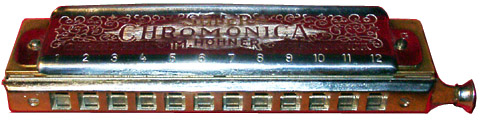
A chromatic harmonica

Since the 1940s, a number of concertos have been written for the harmonica. Nearly all harmonica concertos are composed for the chromatic harmonica. One of the few exceptions is the 2001 concerto for the 10-hole harmonica by Howard Levy.

The American classical and jazz harmonica soloist Larry Adler (1914-2001), for whom many composers wrote harmonica concertos

Such works include:

- Malcolm Arnold: Concerto for Harmonica and Orchestra, Op. 46 (1954, composed for Larry Adler)
- Milton Barnes - Concerto for Harmonica and Strings (for Tommy Reilly)
- Arthur Benjamin - Harmonica Concerto (1953, for Larry Adler)
- Jean-François Marcoux - Harmonica Concerto Le sommeil des voeux (1990) et Harmonica concerto 'ôde à Siguer' et Le meilleur don de la conscience
- Robert Russell Bennett - Concerto (1974)
- Jean Berger - Caribbean Concerto (1940, for Larry Adler)
- Henry Cowell Concerto for Harmonica and Orchestra (1962, for John Sebastian)
- Norman Dello Joio - Concertino for Harmonica and Orchestra (1948, for John Sebastian)
- Brett Deubner - Concerto for Harmonica and Orchestra
- Walter Girnatis - Concertino
- Richard Hayman - Concerto (1978)
- Hugo Herrmann - Concertino (1948)
- Alan Hovhaness - Concerto No. 6, op. 114 (1953-4, for John Sebastian)
- George Kleinsinger - Street Corner Concerto (1942, for John Sebastian)
- Karl-Heinz Köper - Concerto for Harmonica and Orchestra, Op. 12 (1961, for Tommy Reilly)
- Serge Lancen - Concerto (1958, for Larry Adler)
- Alan Langford: Concertante for Harmonica and Strings (1981, for Tommy Reilly)
- Howard Levy - Concerto for Diatonic Harmonica and Orchestra - first concerto for 10-hole harmonica and orchestra
- Frank Lewin - Concerto for Harmonica and Orchestra (1960, for John Sebastian)
- Terje Rypdal: Modulations for Harmonica and Orchestra (1981, for Sigmund Groven)
- Henri Sauguet - The Garden's Concerto (1970, for Claude Garden)
- Henning Sommerro: Concertino for Harmonica and Orchestra (2008. for Sigmund Groven)
- Michael Spivakovsky - Concerto (1951, for Tommy Reilly)
- Siegfried Steinkogler - Harmonica Concerto (2001, for Sigmund Groven)
- Vilém Tauský - Concertino (1963, for Tommy Reilly)
- Alexander Tcherepnin - Concerto for Harmonica and Orchestra, Op. 86 (1953, for John Sebastian)
- Heitor Villa-Lobos - Concerto for Harmonica and Orchestra (1955, for John Sebastian)
- Meiro Sugawara - Concerto for Harmonica and Orchestra (1978, for Joe Sakimoto)
- Graham Whettam
  - Concerto Scherzoso, Op. 9 (1951, Larry Adler)
  - Second Concerto, Op. 34 (for Tommy Reilly)
- Corky Siegel
  - Corky Siegel's Chamber Blues – Chamber Blues (1994 – Alligator)
  - Complementary Colors – Chamber Blues (1998 – Gadfly)
  - Corky Siegel's Traveling Chamber Blues Show – Chamber Blues (2005 – Alligator)
  - A good portion of Chamber Blues material is written as a harmonic concerto. i.e. Opus 7, Opus 8, Opus 12 Filisko's Dream, Opus 13 Unfinished Jump, Opus 17, Opus 18, Opus 19, Opus 20, Opus 21, Opus 22, Five Planets in Harmonica Convergence, .. all for Harmonica and String Quartet with East Indian Tabla is some cases.
- Radames Gnatalli
  - Concerto para harmônica de boca e orquestra (1959 for Edu da Gaita)
  - Concerto nº 2 para harmônica e orquestra (1968)
