= Yasuo Watani =

Japanese chromatic harmonica player (born 1960)

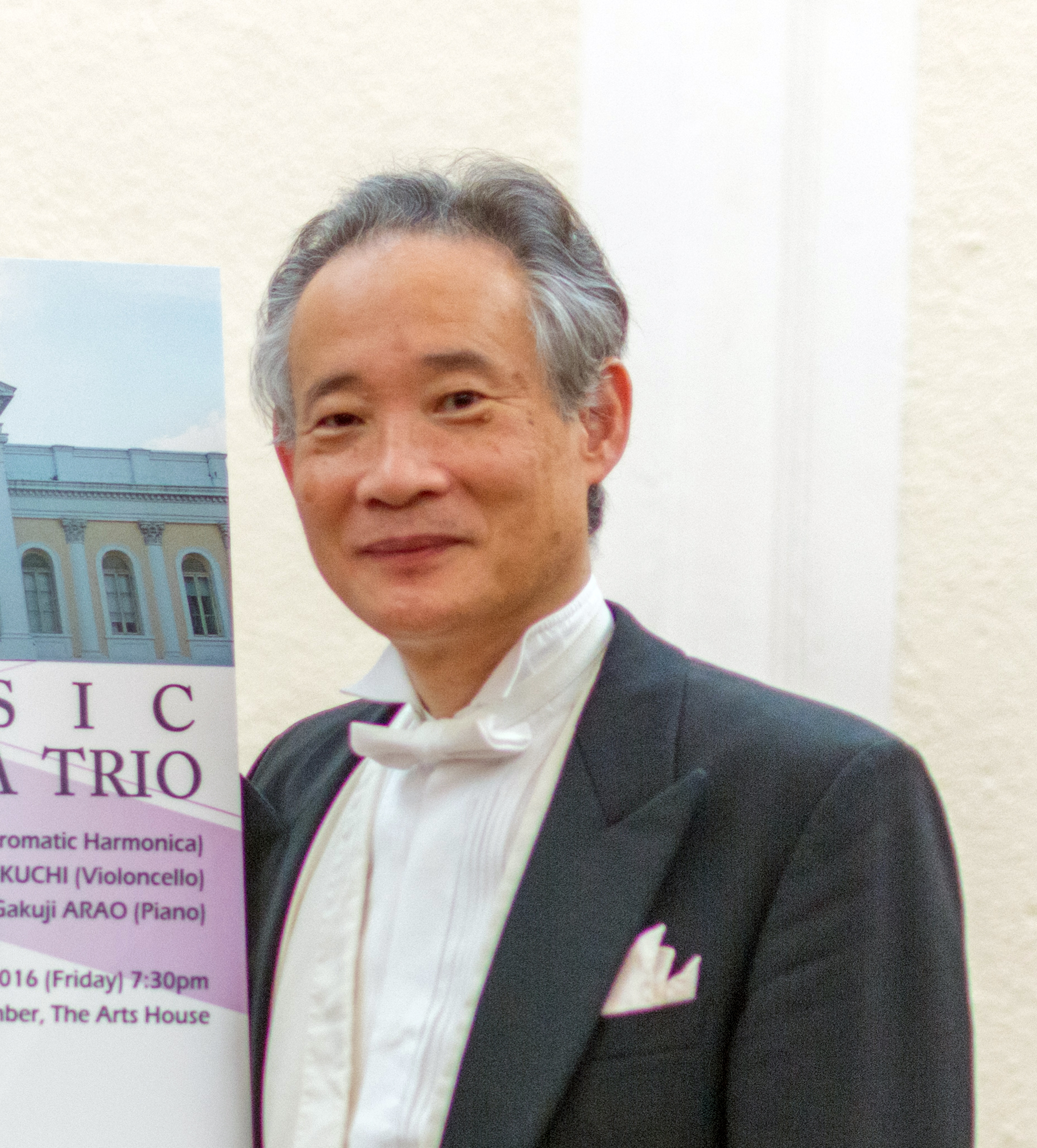
- Yasuo Watani
- Born: 1960 (age 65–66); Kyoto, Japan
- Occupations: Harmonica Soloist; Educator

Yasuo Watani (born in 1960) is a Japanese chromatic harmonica player. He was born in Kyoto, Japan and had his first harmonica lessons with Tadao Kobayashi in 1966. After graduating from Doshisha University (Faculty of Commerce) in 1984 with a degree in Economics, he studied the chromatic harmonica with Helmuth Herold at the Hohner-Konservatorium Trossingen in Germany from 1984 to 1988. He also learned the harmonica from the Canadian harmonica soloist Tommy Reilly. Watani was invited to stay on as a Lecturer at the Hohner-Konservatorium and taught from 1988 to 2002. Since 2005, he is a Music Professor for harmonica at Senzoku-Gakuen College of Music, Japan. He has been invited to judge at many harmonica competitions and festivals, including World Harmonica Festival and Asia Pacific Harmonica Festival.

== Career ==
=== Yasuo Watani Harmonica Trio ===
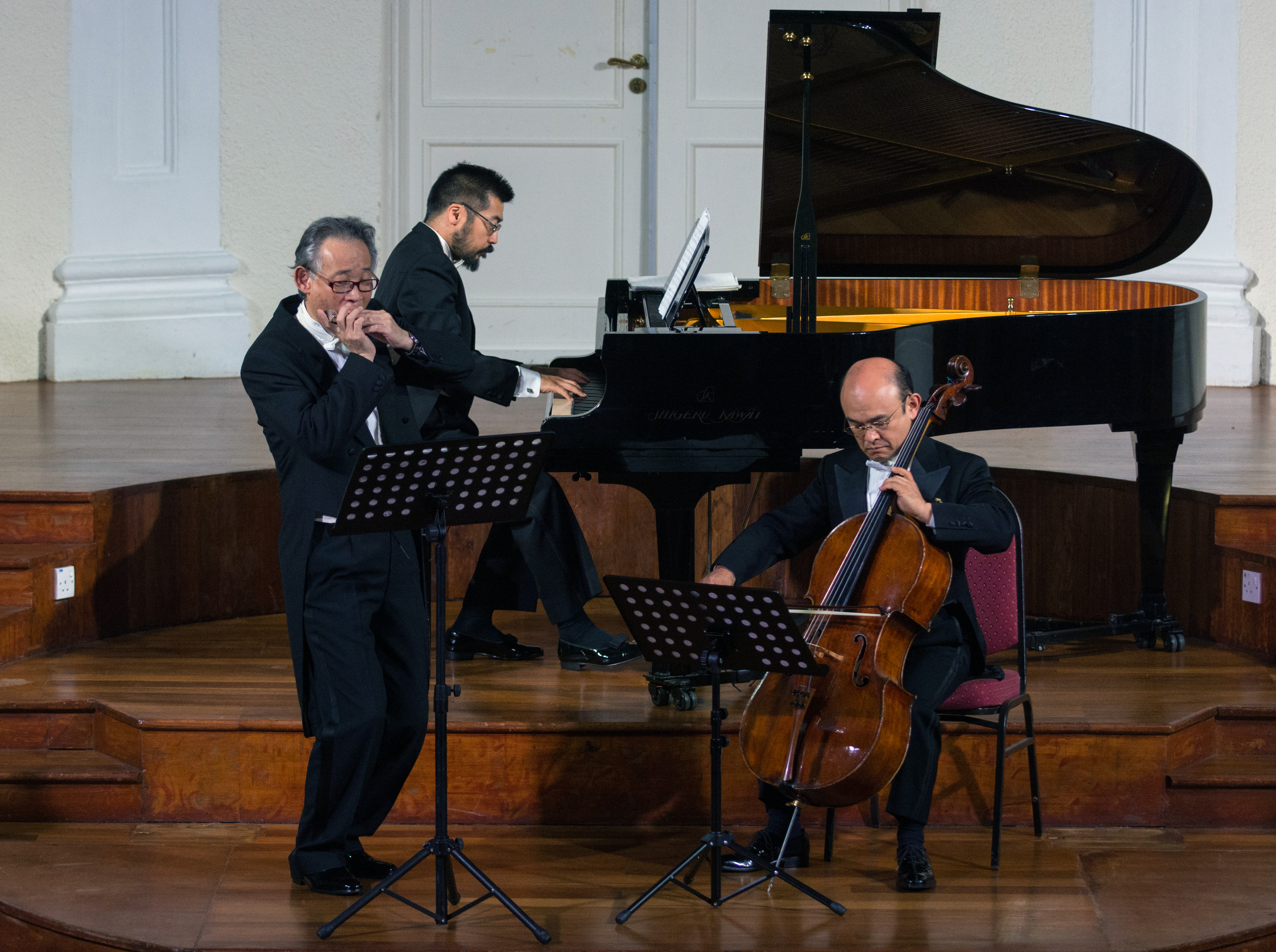
Yasuo Watani Harmonica Trio performing Manjushage Fantasy (曼珠沙华) at The Arts House

In 2012, Watani embarked on a collaboration with cellist Tomoya Kikuchi and pianist Gakuji Arao, who joined him on stage and in the studio as the Yasuo Watani Harmonica Trio. The harmonica-cello-piano trio, the world first of its kind, held its inaugural concert at Asahi Hall on 7 April 2012. The concert was jointly organized by the Asahi Shimbun and the Japan Musical Association. They have since reprised their performance annually.

In 2013, the Trio recorded an international album entitled Matador, The Harmonica of Passion which features works of Astor Piazzolla, Pablo de Sarasate, James Moody, Manuel de Falla, Ernesto Lecuona and Pablo Casals. The Trio had its first overseas concert Classical Harmonica Trio at The Arts House in Singapore in 2016.

Since the establishment of Yasuo Watani Harmonica Trio, Watani has been actively introducing this performing model by performing with pianists and cellists outside Japan. In 2012, he performed Camille Saint-Saëns's The Swan, Astor Piazolla's Libertango and Vittorio Monti's Czardas with cellist Chan Wei Shing and pianist Mariko Watani in Singapore. In 2014, Watani performed Piazolla's Oblivion with Bösendorfer pianist Josephine Koh and cellist Natasha Liu in a harmonica-cello-piano trio in the concert entitled 'A Harmonica Fantasy' at Esplanade.

The other members of the Yasuo Watani Harmonica Trio

Tomoya Kikuchi (cellist): Tomoya Kikuchi graduated with a degree in music from Tokyo University of the Arts. Currently, he is the Cello Soloist in the Japan Philharmonic Orchestra. He is also a member of Kioi Sinfonietta Tokyo, Alpha String Quartet, Nomad Ensemble, Baroque 21 Ensemble and Rococo Ensemble. In addition, Kikuchi is a part-time lecturer at Tokyo University of the Arts, Toho Gakuen School of Music and Toho Gakuen College of Art.

Gakuji Arao (pianist): Gakuji Arao graduated with a master's degree from Tokyo University of the Arts. He studied composition under Masayuki Nagatomi, Yoriaki Matsudaira and Ichiro Nodaira. He was also a piano student of Mayumi Nozawa and Ikuko Endo. Arao is a piano accompanist widely trusted by instrumental and vocal musicians. He has been appointed part-time lecturer at Tokyo University of the Arts and assistant professor at Mie University. Currently, he is an associate professor at Tokyo College of Music and a member of the board of directors of Solfege Studies Conference Japan.

=== Music educator ===
From 1988 to 2002, Watani was a lecturer at the Hohner-Konservatorium Trossingen in Germany. Since 2005, he is a Music Professor for harmonica at Senzoku-Gakuen College of Music, Japan. He is also the Residential Harmonica Lecturer for the National University of Singapore Harmonica since 1999. From 2003 to 2009, Watani mentored KR Harmonica, a harmonica ensemble based in Singapore, and recorded the CD Kent Ridge Ensembles together in 2006. The Ministry of Education of the government of Singapore appointed him as the judge for the Singapore Youth Festival since 2010.

Watani has mentored many chromatic harmonica players of the younger generation, and some of them are as follows:

- Naoko Takeuchi
- Kathrin Gass
- Arinori Inagawa
- Cy Leo
- Au Chun Lok
- Wesley (Wong Chi Wing)
- Long Tao Shen
- Cecilia Poon
- Jane Poon
- Members of KR Harmonica ensemble: Cheong Wee Gee, Ong Wee Meng, Nyo Shuenn Yann, Sherine Ho and Budi Santoso

=== Composer ===
Some of the pieces composed by Watani for chromatic harmonica are as follows:

- Fantasy Etude
- Excursion
- Fantasy Dream

== Notable live performances ==
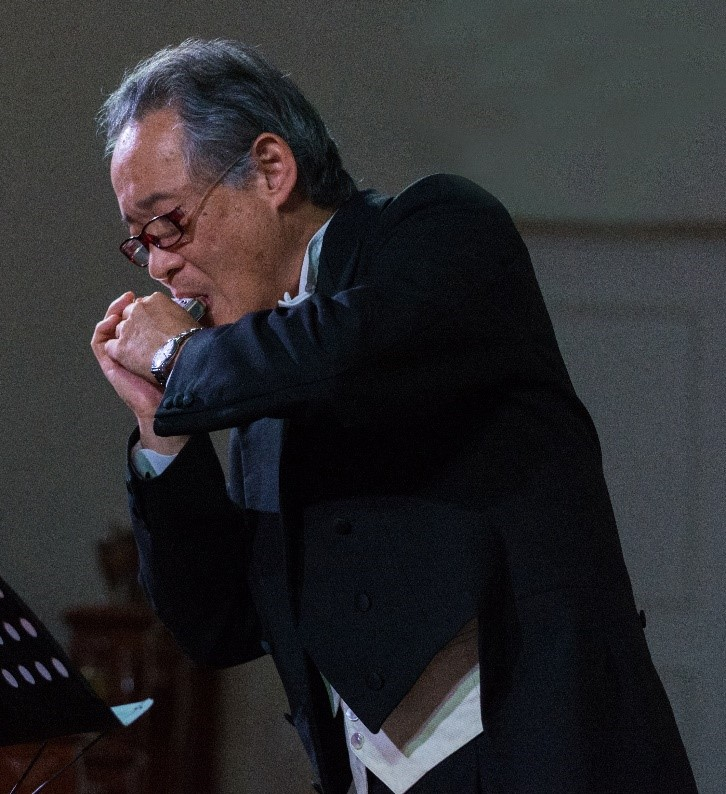
Yasuo Watani performing at The Arts House in Singapore in 2016

Watani has staged numerous solo concerts in many parts of the world including Germany (Düsseldorf), Japan (Tokyo, Kyoto, Kobe and Yokohama), Hong Kong, Singapore, South Korea, Argentina and Brazil.

He has performed as a concert soloist with Wurttemberg Philharmonic Orchestra, Kyoto Symphony Orchestra, Japan Shinsei Symphony Orchestra, Gunma Symphony Orchestra, Tokyo Philharmonic Orchestra, Osaka Philharmonic Orchestra, Sendai Philharmonic Orchestra and the New Japan Philharmonic Orchestra conducted by Seiji Ozawa. Some of his notable concerto performances are as follows:

- Harmonica Concerto composed by Heitor Villa-Lobos at Sendai, Hiroshima, Reutlingen (Germany) with New Japan Philharmonic
- Prelude and Dance for Harmonica and Orchestra composed by Robert Farnon at Kyushu, Gunma with Kyoto Symphonic Orchestra
- Harmonica Concerto composed by Arthur Benjamin with Tokyo Philharmonic Orchestra
- Toledo, Spanish Fantasy for Harmonica and Orchestra composed by James Moody at Sendai, Kyushu

Watani also performed ensemble pieces written for harmonica and other instruments. Some of the pieces are as follows:

- Pieces composed by Yoichi Togawa:
1. Tamayura for harmonica and guitar (1994)
2. Trio Sonata for harmonica, flute and fagott (1997)
3. Celluloid Fantasy for harmonica and two flutes (2002)
4. Hikaribeni for harmonica and string quartet (2004)
5. Romantic Memory for harmonica, violin and cello (2010)
6. By the Flowing Waters for harmonica, cello and piano (2018)
- Piece composed by Jorge Mejia:
  - Recuerdos del Mayab for harmonica and guitar (1996)
- Piece composed by Tami Nodaira:
  - Reminiscence for harmonica and string quartet (2004)

In 1999, Watani had his debut performance in Singapore with Harmonica Fantasy, a concert presented by the Centre for the Arts (CFA), National University of Singapore. Professor Edwin Thumboo, the Chairman/Director of CFA then, commented that: “Mr Watani’s musicality, music interpretation and mastery of the technically demanding yet versatile mouth organ is an inspiration to us all.” On 5 September 2000, Watani had invited by the National University of Singapore to perform at the Official Opening of the University Cultural Centre. He performed without microphone amplification on his silver concerto harmonica Toledo, Spanish Fantasy for Harmonica and Orchestra composed by James Moody with the piano accompaniment by Mariko Watani to 1600 audiences.

On 13 December 2019, Watani played the world premiere contemporary classical piece Laughing Harmonica, Boiling Harmonica (ハーモニカは笑い、そして沸騰する) written for him by Japanese composer Shin-ichiro Ikebe in the concert entitled 'Jeux vifs et colores' in Tokyo. Watani performed the same piece on 16 February 2020 in Uozu city during the annual concert, Musical Tales of Early Spring, organized by the Shin-ichiro Ikebe.

== Notable awards and recognitions ==
- 1988: 1st Prize for the International Harmonica Competition in the Netherlands
- 1989: 1st Prize in the 2nd World Harmonica Competition in Trossingen, Germany
- 1996: Muramatsu Award (村松賞)
- 1997: Kyoto Aoyama Music Awards (京都府青山音楽賞)
- 1998: Kyoto Prefecture Culture Prize “Encouragement Prize” (京都府文化賞奨励賞)

== Discography ==
- 1995: ハーモニカ幻想. Yasuo Watani, harmonica; Tomislav Baynov, piano; Hiroaki Mizuma, fagot; Mariko Watani, harpsichord, piano
- 1995: ハーモニカによる日本の調べ. Yasuo Watani, harmonica; Nodaira Ichiro, piano
- 1999: Harmonica Fantasy. Live concert recording at Touch Community Theatre, Singapore
- 2004: Harmonica Nostalgia: Harmonica with String Trio Cembalo and Harp. Yasuo Watani, harmonica; Daiki Shimizu, violin; Kenta Matsumi, viola; Shinichi Eguchi, cello; Marie Nishiyama, harp & cembalo
- 2013: Matador, The Harmonica of Passion. Yasuo Watani, chromatic harmonica; Gakuji Arao, piano; Tomoya Kikuchi, cello
- 2017: Manjushage Fantasy. Yasuo Watani, chromatic harmonica; Gakuji Arao, piano; Tomoya Kikuchi, cello

== Media appearances ==
Watani's performances have been recorded both on radio and television in Germany and NHK Japan Corporation.
