= Concerto =

Musical composition typically for a soloist with accompaniment

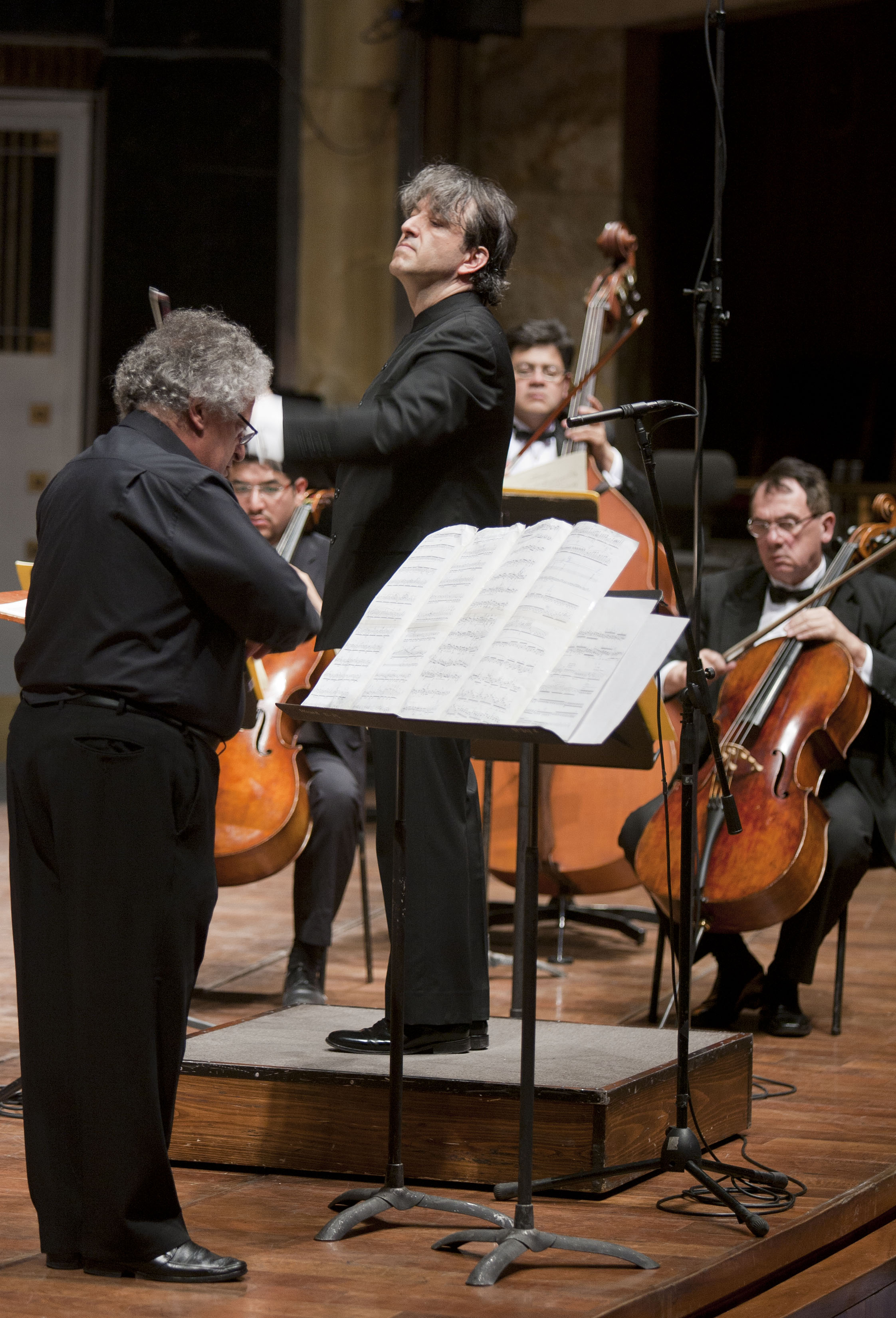
Violinist Irvine Arditti performing Ligeti's Violin Concerto with the Mexico City Philharmonic Orchestra conducted by José Areán, 2014

A concerto (/kənˈtʃɛərtoʊ/; plural concertos, or concerti from the Italian plural) is, since the late Baroque era, mostly understood as an instrumental composition, written for one or more soloists accompanied by an orchestra or other ensemble. The typical three-movement structure, a slow movement (e.g., lento or adagio) preceded and followed by fast movements (e.g., presto or allegro), became a standard from the early 18th century.

The concerto originated as a genre of vocal music in the late 16th century: the instrumental variant appeared around a century later, when Italians such as Arcangelo Corelli and Giuseppe Torelli started to publish their concertos. A few decades later, Venetian composers, such as Antonio Vivaldi, had written hundreds of violin concertos, while also producing solo concertos for other instruments such as a cello or a woodwind instrument, and concerti grossi for a group of soloists. The first keyboard concertos, such as George Frideric Handel's organ concertos and Johann Sebastian Bach's harpsichord concertos, were written around the same time.

In the second half of the 18th century, the piano became the most used keyboard instrument, and composers of the Classical era such as Joseph Haydn, Wolfgang Amadeus Mozart and Ludwig van Beethoven each wrote several piano concertos, and, to a lesser extent, violin concertos, and concertos for other instruments. In the Romantic Era, many composers, including Giuseppe Verdi, Niccolò Paganini, Felix Mendelssohn, Frédéric Chopin, Robert Schumann, Johannes Brahms, Pyotr Ilyich Tchaikovsky and Sergei Rachmaninoff, continued to write solo concertos, and, more exceptionally, concertos for more than one instrument; 19th century concertos for instruments other than the piano, violin and cello remained comparatively rare, however. In the first half of the 20th century, concertos were written by, among others, Maurice Ravel, Edward Elgar, Richard Strauss, Sergei Prokofiev, George Gershwin, Heitor Villa-Lobos, Joaquín Rodrigo and Béla Bartók, the latter also composing a concerto for orchestra, that is, without soloist. During the 20th century concertos appeared by major composers for orchestral instruments which had been neglected in the 19th century such as the clarinet, viola and French horn.

In the second half of the 20th century and onwards into the 21st a great many composers have continued to write concertos, including Alfred Schnittke, György Ligeti, Dmitri Shostakovich, Philip Glass and James MacMillan among many others. An interesting feature of this period is the proliferation of concerti for less usual instruments, including orchestral ones such as the double bass (by composers like Eduard Tubin or Peter Maxwell Davies) and cor anglais (like those by MacMillan and Aaron Jay Kernis), but also folk instruments (such as Tubin's concerto for Balalaika, Serry's Concerto in C Major for Bassetti Accordion, or the concertos for Harmonica by Villa-Lobos and Malcolm Arnold), and even Deep Purple's Concerto for Group and Orchestra, a concerto for a rock band.

Concertos from previous ages have remained a conspicuous part of the repertoire for concert performances and recordings. Less common has been the previously common practice of the composition of concertos by a performer to be performed personally, though the practice has continued via certain composer-performers such as Daniil Trifonov.

== Genre ==
The Italian word concerto, meaning accord or gathering, derives from the Latin verb concertare, which indicates a competition or battle.

=== Baroque Era ===
Compositions were for the first time indicated as concertos in the title of a music print in 1587, when the Concerti by Andrea and Giovanni Gabrieli were published.

==== Concerto as a genre of vocal music ====
In the 17th century, sacred works for voices and orchestra were typically called concertos, as reflected by J. S. Bach's usage of the title "concerto" for many of the works that are now known as cantatas. The term "concerto" was initially used to denote works that involved voices and instruments in which the instruments had independent parts—as opposed to the Renaissance common practice in which instruments that accompanied voices only doubled the voice parts. Examples of this earlier form of concerto include Giovanni Gabrieli's "In Ecclesiis" or Heinrich Schütz's "Saul, Saul, was verfolgst du mich".

==== Instrumental concerto ====
The concerto began to take its modern shape in the late-Baroque period, beginning with the concerto grosso form developed by Arcangelo Corelli. Corelli's concertino group was two violins, a cello and basso continuo. In J. S. Bach's Fifth Brandenburg Concerto, for example, the concertino is a flute, a violin, and a harpsichord; although the harpsichord is a featured solo instrument, it also sometimes plays with the ripieno, functioning as a continuo keyboard accompaniment.

Later, the concerto approached its modern form, in which the concertino usually reduces to a single solo instrument playing with (or against) an orchestra. The main composers of concertos of the baroque were Tommaso Albinoni, Antonio Vivaldi (e.g., published in L'estro armonico, La stravaganza, Six Violin Concertos, Op. 6, Twelve Concertos, Op. 7, Il cimento dell'armonia e dell'inventione, Six Flute Concertos, Op. 10, Six Concertos, Op. 11 and Six Violin Concertos, Op. 12), Georg Philipp Telemann, Johann Sebastian Bach, George Frideric Handel, Pietro Locatelli, Jean-Marie Leclair, Giuseppe Tartini, Francesco Geminiani and Johann Joachim Quantz. The concerto was intended as a composition typical of the Italian style of the time, and all the composers were studying how to compose in the Italian fashion (all'Italiana).

The Baroque concerto was mainly for a string instrument (violin, viola, cello, occasionally viola d'amore, viola da gamba or harp) or a wind instrument (flute, recorder, oboe, bassoon, horn, or trumpet). Bach also wrote a concerto for two violins and orchestra. During the Baroque period, before the invention of the piano, keyboard concertos were comparatively rare, with the exception of the twelve organ concertos by George Frideric Handel and the thirteen harpsichord concertos by Johann Sebastian Bach.

=== Classical era ===
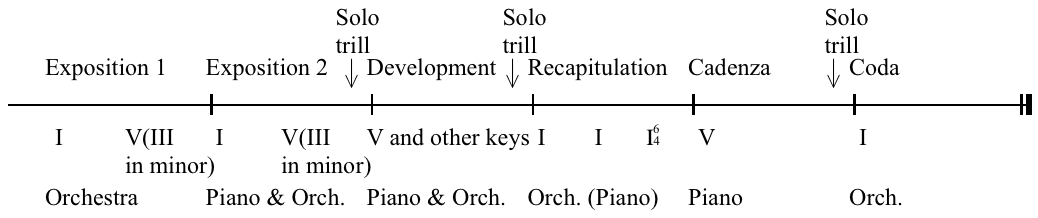
Sonata form in the Classical Concerto. See: trill, cadenza, and coda. For exposition, development and recapitulation, see sonata form.

The concertos of the sons of Johann Sebastian Bach, such as C. P. E. Bach, are perhaps the best links between those of the Baroque period and those of the Classical era. It is conventional to state that the first movements of concertos from the Classical period onwards follow the structure of sonata form. Final movements are often in rondo form, as in J.S. Bach's E Major Violin Concerto.

Mozart wrote five violin concertos, all in 1775, except the first in 1773. They show a number of influences, notably Italian and Austrian. Several passages have leanings towards folk music, as manifested in Austrian serenades. Mozart also wrote the Sinfonia Concertante for violin, viola and orchestra. Haydn wrote three concertos for violin and above all two for cello. Beethoven wrote only one violin concerto that remained obscure until revealed as a masterpiece in a performance by violin virtuoso Joseph Joachim on 27 May 1844.

C.P.E. Bach's keyboard concertos contain some virtuosic solo writing. Some of them have movements that run into one another without a break, and there are frequent cross-movement thematic references. Mozart, as a child, made arrangements for keyboard and orchestra of four sonatas by now little-known composers. Then he arranged three sonata movements by Johann Christian Bach. By the time he was twenty, Mozart was able to write concerto ritornelli that gave the orchestra admirable opportunity for asserting its character in an exposition with some five or six sharply contrasted themes, before the soloist enters to elaborate on the material. Of his 27 piano concertos, the last 17 are highly appreciated. Eleven cataloged keyboard concertos are attributed to Haydn, of which seven are considered genuine. Beethoven wrote five concertos for piano and orchestra.

C. P. E. Bach wrote five flute concertos and two oboe concertos. Mozart wrote four horn concertos, two for flute, one for oboe (later rearranged for flute and known as Flute Concerto No. 2), one for clarinet, one for bassoon, one for flute and harp, and Exsultate, jubilate, a de facto concerto for soprano voice. They all exploit and explore the characteristics of the solo instrument(s). Haydn wrote an important trumpet concerto and a Sinfonia Concertante for violin, cello, oboe, bassoon and orchestra, as well as one horn concerto. Haydn also wrote a concerto for double bass, but it was lost to history in the great fire of Eszterháza in 1779.

=== Romantic era ===
In the 19th century, the concerto as a vehicle for virtuosic display flourished, and concertos became increasingly complex and ambitious works. Whilst performances of typical concertos in the baroque era lasted about ten minutes, those by Beethoven could last half an hour or longer. The term concertino, or the German Konzertstuck ("Concert Piece") began to be used to designate smaller pieces not considered large enough to be considered a full concerto, though the distinction has never been formalised and many Concertinos are still longer than the original Baroque concertos.

During the Romantic era the cello became increasingly used as a concerto instrument; though the violin and piano remained the most frequently used. Beethoven contributed to the repertoire of concertos for more than one soloist with a Triple Concerto for piano, violin, cello and orchestra while later in the century, Brahms wrote a Double Concerto for violin, cello and orchestra.

=== 20th and 21st century ===
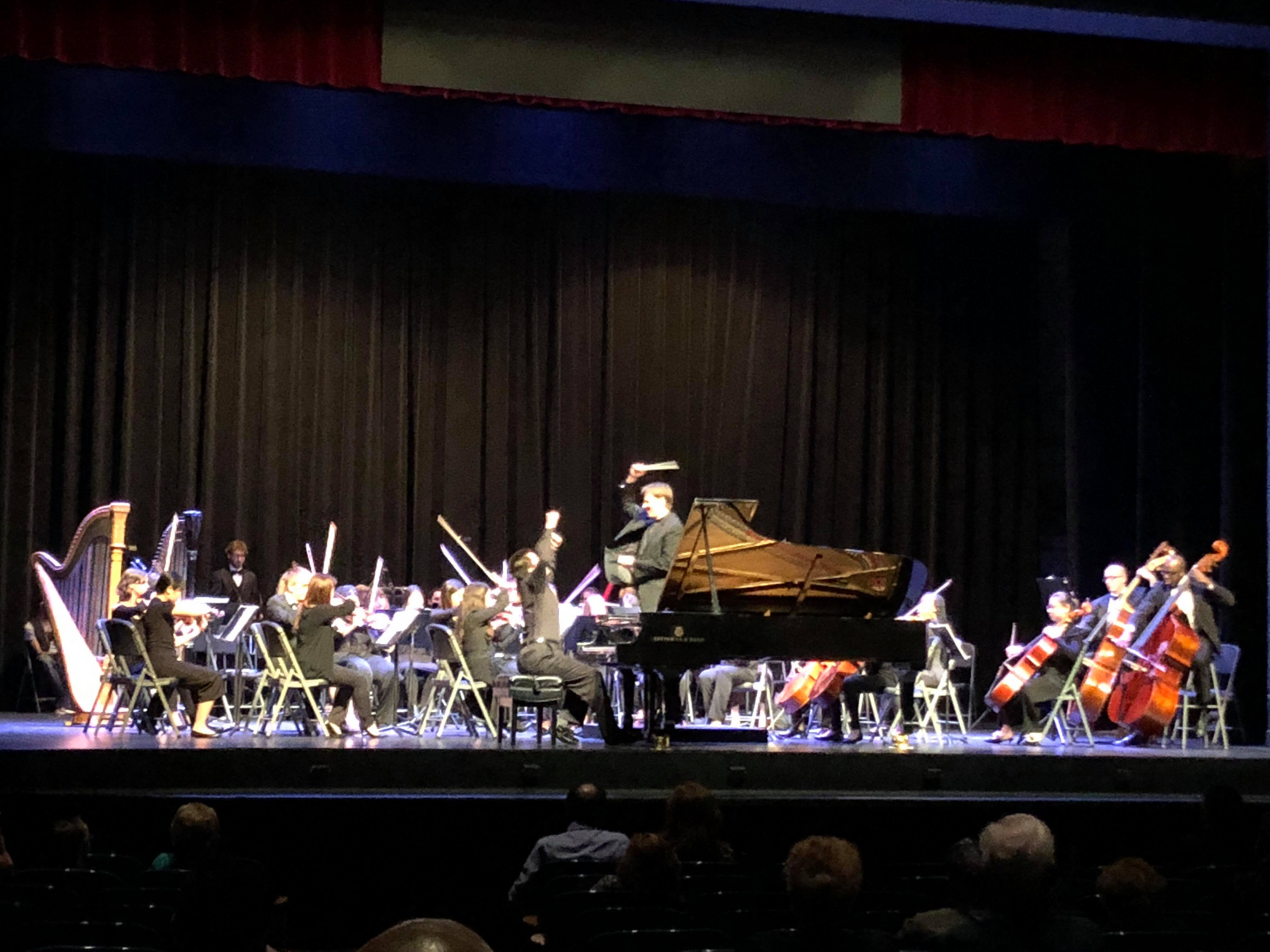
A performance of a piano concerto

Many of the concertos written in the early 20th century belong more to the late Romantic school, hence modernistic movement. Masterpieces were written by Edward Elgar (a violin concerto and a cello concerto), Sergei Rachmaninoff and Nikolai Medtner (four and three piano concertos, respectively), Jean Sibelius (a violin concerto), Frederick Delius (a violin concerto, a cello concerto, a piano concerto and a double concerto for violin and cello), Karol Szymanowski (two violin concertos and a "Symphonie Concertante" for piano), and Richard Strauss (two horn concertos, a violin concerto, Don Quixote—a tone poem that features the cello as a soloist—and among later works, an oboe concerto).

However, in the first decades of the 20th century, several composers such as Debussy, Schoenberg, Berg, Hindemith, Stravinsky, Prokofiev and Bartók started experimenting with ideas that were to have far-reaching consequences for the way music is written and, in some cases, performed. Some of these innovations include a more frequent use of modality, the exploration of non-western scales, the development of atonality and neotonality, the wider acceptance of dissonances, the invention of the twelve-tone technique of composition and the use of polyrhythms and complex time signatures.

These changes also affected the concerto as a musical form. Beside more or less radical effects on musical language, they led to a redefinition of the concept of virtuosity that included new and extended instrumental techniques and a focus on previously neglected aspects of sound such as pitch, timbre and dynamics. In some cases, they also brought about a new approach to the role of soloists and their relation to the orchestra.

Two great innovators of early 20th-century music, Schoenberg and Stravinsky, both wrote violin concertos. The material in Schoenberg's concerto, like that in Berg's, is linked by the twelve-tone serial method. In the 20th century, particularly after the Second World War, the cello enjoyed an unprecedented popularity. As a result, its concertante repertoire caught up with those of the piano and the violin both in terms of quantity and quality.

The 20th century also witnessed a growth of the concertante repertoire of instruments, some of which had seldom or never been used in this capacity, and even a concerto for wordless coloratura soprano by Reinhold Glière. As a result, almost all classical instruments now have a concertante repertoire. Among the works of the prolific composer Alan Hovhaness may be noted Prayer of St. Gregory for trumpet and strings, though it is not a concerto in the usual sense of the term. In the later 20th century the concerto tradition was continued by composers such as Maxwell Davies, whose series of Strathclyde Concertos exploit some of the instruments less familiar as soloists.

In addition, the 20th century gave rise to several composers who experimented further by showcasing a variety of nontraditional orchestral instruments within the center of the orthodox concerto form. Included within this group are: Paul Hindemith (Concerto for Trautonium and String Orchestra in 1931), Paul Creston (Concerto for Saxophone and Orchestra, Op. 26 in 1941), Andre Jolivet (Concerto of Ondes Martenot in 1947), Heitor Villa-Lobos (Concerto for Harmonica in 1956), John Serry Sr. (Concerto in C major for Bassetti Accordion in 1966), Astor Piazzolla (Concerto for Bandoneon, String Orchestra and Percussion, "Aconcagua" in 1979), Peter Maxwell Davies (Concerto for Piccolo and Orchestra, Op. 182 in 1996), and Tan Dun (Concerto for Water Percussion and Orchestra in 1998)

Other composers of this era adopted a neoclassical rejection of specific features which typically characterized the concerto form during the Baroque or Romantic periods. Several of them achieved this objective by incorporating various musical elements from the realm of jazz within the structure of the concerto. Included in this group were: Aaron Copland (Concerto for Piano, 1926), Maurice Ravel (Concerto for the Left Hand, 1929), Igor Stravinsky (Ebony Concerto for clarinet and jazz band, 1945) and George Gershwin (Concerto in F, 1925). Still others called upon the orchestra itself to function as the primary virtuosic force within the concerto form. This approach was adopted by Béla Bartók in his Concerto for Orchestra as well by other composers of the period including: Walter Piston (1933), Zoltan Kodaly (1939), Michael Tippet (1962) and Elliott Carter (1969).

Concertos with concert band include:

- Bryant – 2007–2010
- Foss – 2002
- Husa – 1982
- Jacob – 1974
- Jager – 1982

== By type ==
=== Vocal concerto ===
20th century:

- Coloratura soprano Concerto: Reinhold Glière

=== Without orchestra ===
==== Single solo instrument ====
Baroque era:

- Bach:
  - Italian Concerto
  - Weimar concerto transcriptions

20th century:

- Serry's Concerto In C Major For Free Bass Accordion

==== Multiple instruments ====
Baroque era:

- Bach's concerto for two harpsichords, BWV 1061.1
- Telemann's concertos for four violins

20th century:

- Webern's Concerto for Nine Instruments
- Stravinsky's Concerto for Two Pianos

=== For one instrumental soloist and orchestra ===
==== For bowed string instrument and orchestra ====
===== Violin concerto =====
Baroque era:

- Vivaldi:
  - Nos. 3, 6, 9 and 12 of L'estro armonico
  - La stravaganza
  - Six Violin Concertos, Op. 6
  - Ten of the Twelve Concertos, Op. 7
  - Il cimento dell'armonia e dell'inventione, which includes The Four Seasons
  - Five of the Six Concertos, Op. 11
  - Six Violin Concertos, Op. 12
  - Grosso mogul
- Bach:
  - Violin Concerto in A minor
  - Violin Concerto in E major

Classical era:

- Mozart:
  - No. 1 in B♭ major, K. 207
  - No. 2 in D major, K. 211
  - No. 3 in G major, K. 216 (Straßburg)
  - No. 4 in D major, K. 218
  - No. 5 in A major, K. 219 (Turkish)

Early Romantic traits can be found in the violin concertos of Viotti, but it is Spohr's twelve violin concertos, written between 1802 and 1827, that truly embrace the Romantic spirit with their melodic as well as their dramatic qualities.

20th century:

- Arnold Schoenberg
- Igor Stravinsky
- Alban Berg
- Bartók wrote two concertos for violin.
- Russian composers Prokofiev and Shostakovich each wrote two concertos while Khachaturian wrote a concerto and a Concerto-Rhapsody for the instrument.
- Hindemith's concertos hark back to the forms of the 19th century, even if the harmonic language he used was different.
- Three violin concertos from David Diamond show the form in neoclassical style.
- In 1950 Carlos Chávez completed a substantial Violin Concerto with an enormous central cadenza for the unaccompanied violin.
- Dutilleux's L'Arbre des songes has proved an important addition to the repertoire and a fine example of the composer's atonal yet melodic style.
- Other composers of major violin concertos include John Adams, Samuel Barber, Benjamin Britten, Peter Maxwell Davies, Miguel del Aguila, Philip Glass, Cristóbal Halffter, György Ligeti, Frank Martin, Bohuslav Martinů, Carl Nielsen, Walter Piston, Alfred Schnittke, Jean Sibelius, Ralph Vaughan Williams, William Walton, John Williams and Roger Sessions.

21st century:

- Elfman's violin concerto

===== Viola concerto =====
Baroque era:

- Viola Concerto in G major (Telemann)

Classical era:

- Franz Anton Hoffmeister
  - Viola Concerto in D major
  - Viola Concerto in B♭ major
- Viola Concerto in D major, Op. 1 (Carl Stamitz)
- Viola Concerto in E♭ major, ICZ 17 (Carl Friedrich Zelter)

20th century:

- Viola concerto: Kalevi Aho, Malcolm Arnold, Béla Bartók (Viola Concerto), Miguel del Aguila, Edison Denisov, Renaud Gagneux, Sofia Gubaidulina, Paul Hindemith, Giya Kancheli, Bohuslav Martinů, Darius Milhaud, Tristan Murail, Krzysztof Penderecki, Alfred Schnittke, Tōru Takemitsu, William Walton (Viola Concerto)

===== Cello concerto =====
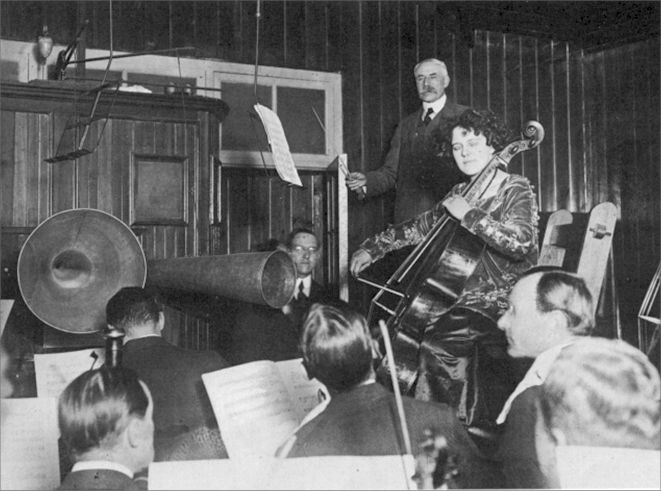
Elgar and Beatrice Harrison making the first (abridged) recording of Elgar's Cello Concerto (1920). Note the acoustic recording horns. Harrison would go on to make the first complete recording in 1928.

The 'core' repertoire—performed the most of any cello concertos—are by Elgar, Dvořák, Saint-Saëns, Haydn, Shostakovich and Schumann, but many more concertos are performed nearly as often.

Baroque era:

- Vivaldi's cello concertos RV 398–403, 405–414 and 416–424

Classical era:

- Haydn wrote two cello concertos (for cello, oboes, horns, and strings), which are the most important works in that genre of the classical era.
- Carl Philipp Emanuel Bach wrote three cello concertos and Luigi Boccherini wrote twelve cello concertos.

Romantic era:

- Antonín Dvořák's cello concerto ranks among the supreme examples from the Romantic era while Robert Schumann's focuses on the lyrical qualities of the instrument.
- The instrument was also popular with composers of the Franco-Belgian tradition: Saint-Saëns and Vieuxtemps wrote two cello concertos each and Lalo and Jongen one.
- Tchaikovsky's contribution to the genre is a series of Variations on a Rococo Theme. He also left very fragmentary sketches of a projected Cello Concerto. Cellist Yuriy Leonovich and Tchaikovsky researcher Brett Langston published their completion of the piece in 2006.
- Carl Reinecke, David Popper and Julius Klengel also wrote cello concertos that were popular in their time and are still played occasionally nowadays.
- Elgar's popular concerto, while written in the early 20th century, belongs to the late romantic period stylistically.

20th century:

- An important factor for the 20th-century cello concerto was the rise of virtuoso cellist Mstislav Rostropovich. His outstanding technique and passionate playing prompted dozens of composers to write pieces for him, first in his native Soviet Union and then abroad. Among such compositions may be listed Sergei Prokofiev's Symphony-Concerto, Dmitri Shostakovich's two cello concertos, Benjamin Britten's Cello-Symphony (which emphasizes, as its title suggests, the equal importance of soloist and orchestra), Henri Dutilleux' Tout un monde lointain..., Cristóbal Halffter's two cello concertos, Witold Lutosławski's cello concerto, Dmitry Kabalevsky's two cello concertos, Aram Khachaturian's Concerto-Rhapsody, Arvo Pärt's Pro et Contra, Alfred Schnittke, André Jolivet and Krzysztof Penderecki second cello concertos, Sofia Gubaidulina's Canticles of the Sun, Luciano Berio's Ritorno degli Snovidenia, Leonard Bernstein's Three Meditations, James MacMillan's cello concerto and Olivier Messiaen's Concert à quatre (a quadruple concerto for cello, piano, oboe, flute and orchestra).
- In addition, several important composers who were not directly influenced by Rostropovich wrote cello concertos: Samuel Barber, Elliott Carter, Carlos Chávez, Miguel del Aguila, Alexander Glazunov, Hans Werner Henze, Paul Hindemith, Arthur Honegger, Erich Wolfgang Korngold, György Ligeti, Bohuslav Martinů, Darius Milhaud, Nikolai Myaskovsky, Einojuhani Rautavaara, Joaquín Rodrigo, Tōru Takemitsu, William Walton, Heitor Villa-Lobos, and Bernd Alois Zimmermann for instance.

===== Double bass concerto =====
20th century:

- Double bass concerto: Aho, Gagneux, Dittersdorf, Henze, Koussevitsky, Davies, Ohzawa, Rautavaara, Skalkottas, Tubin

===== Other bowed string instruments =====
Baroque:

- Viola d'amore concerto: Antonio Vivaldi, six concerti (RV 392-397), as well as a double concerto for viola d'amore and lute (RV 540) and a Chamber Concerto in F major (RV 97)

20th century:

- Viola d'amore concerto: Paul Hindemith

==== For plucked string instrument and orchestra ====
===== Harp concerto =====
Baroque era:

- Handel's Harp Concerto, HWV 294 (a.k.a. Op. 4 No. 6)

Classical era:

- Wolfgang Amadeus Mozart: Concerto for Flute, Harp, and Orchestra
- Jean-Baptiste Krumpholz: Harp Concertos Op. 7 and Op. 9
- Francesco Petrini: Harp Concertos Op. 25, Op. 27 and Op. 29
- Ernst Eichner's Harp Concerto in D major, Op. 9
- Jan Ladislav Dussek: Harp Concertos Op. 15, Op. 30 and Craw 264
- François-Adrien Boieldieu's Harp Concerto in C major

Romantic era:

- Nicolas-Charles Bochsa: Harp Concertos Op. 15 No. 1 and Op. 295
- Elias Parish Alvars: Harp Concertos Op. 81 and Op. 98
- Carl Reinecke's Harp Concerto, Op. 182
- John Thomas's Harp Concerto No. 1
- Henriette Renié's Harp Concerto in C minor

20th century:

- Reinhold Glière's Harp Concerto
- Joseph Jongen's Harp Concerto
- Joaquín Rodrigo's Concierto serenata
- André Jolivet's Concerto for Harp and Chamber Orchestra (1952)
- Darius Milhaud's Harp Concerto, Op. 323 (1953)
- Heitor Villa-Lobos's Harp Concerto
- Alberto Ginastera's Harp Concerto
- Einojuhani Rautavaara's Harp Concerto (2000)

===== Mandolin concerto =====
Baroque era:

- Vivaldi's Mandolin Concerto, RV 425

20th century:

- Thile, Dorman

===== Guitar concerto =====
20th century:

- Guitar Concerto: Arnold, E. Bernstein, Brouwer, Castelnuovo-Tedesco, Hovhaness, Malmsteen, Ohana, Ponce, Rodrigo, Trigos, Villa-Lobos

===== Other plucked string instruments =====
Baroque era:

- Lute concerto in D major (Vivaldi)

20th century:

- Kanun Concerto: Alnar

==== For woodwind instrument and orchestra ====
===== Flute concerto =====
Baroque era:

- Vivaldi:
  - Six Flute Concertos, Op. 10
  - Il gran mogol

Classical era:

- Mozart:
  - Flute Concerto No. 1
  - Flute Concerto No. 2

20th century:

- Western concert flute concerto: Kalevi Aho, Malcolm Arnold, Cécile Chaminade (Flute Concertino), John Corigliano, Peter Maxwell Davies, Edison Denisov, Pascal Dusapin, Chris Harman, Jacques Hétu, Jacques Ibert, André Jolivet, Marcel Landowski, Carl Nielsen, Krzysztof Penderecki, Walter Piston, Einojuhani Rautavaara, Joaquín Rodrigo, Tōru Takemitsu, John Williams
- Piccolo concerto: Peter Maxwell Davies, Lowell Liebermann
- Recorder concerto: Malcolm Arnold, Richard Harvey
- Shakuhachi concerto: Tōru Takemitsu

===== Oboe concerto =====
Baroque era:

- Vivaldi:
  - Two of the Twelve Concertos, Op. 7
  - One of the Six Concertos, Op. 11
- Handel:
  - Oboe Concerto No. 1
  - Oboe Concerto No. 2
  - Oboe Concerto No. 3

Classical era:

- Mozart: Oboe Concerto

Romantic era:

- Vincenzo Bellini: Oboe Concerto

20th century:

- Oboe concerto: Aho, Arnold, Bouliane, Corigliano, Davies, Denisov, Harman, MacMillan, Maderna, Martinů, Penderecki, Shchedrin, Strauss, Vaughan Williams, Zimmermann
- Bass oboe concerto: Bryars

===== English horn =====
20th century:

- English Horn Concerto: Bernard Hoffer, William Kraft, Nicholas Maw, Vazgen Muradian, Vincent Persichetti, Ned Rorem, Pēteris Vasks, Henk de Vlieger

===== Bassoon concerto =====
20th century:

- Bassoon concerto: Aho, Butterworth, Davies, del Aguila, Donatoni, Eckhardt-Gramatté, Fujikura, Gubaidulina, Hétu, Jolivet, Kaipainen, Knipper, Landowski, Panufnik, Rihm, Rota, Sæverud, J. Williams
- Contrabassoon Concerto: Aho, Erb

===== Clarinet concerto =====
20th century:

- Kalevi Aho, Malcolm Arnold, Unsuk Chin, Aaron Copland, Peter Maxwell Davies, Miguel del Aguila, Edison Denisov, Pascal Dusapin, Mohammed Fairouz, Gerald Finzi, Jean Françaix, Stephen Hartke, Jacques Hétu, Paul Hindemith, Carl Nielsen, Krzysztof Penderecki, Walter Piston, Einojuhani Rautavaara, Ralph Shapey, Igor Stravinsky, Tōru Takemitsu, Frank Ticheli, Henri Tomasi, John Williams
- Bass clarinet concerto: Denys Bouliane

21st century:

- Magnus Lindberg: Clarinet Concerto

===== Saxophone concerto =====
20th century:

- Soprano saxophone Concerto: Aho, Higdon, Hovhaness, Mackey, Torke, Yoshimatsu.
- Alto saxophone Concerto: Adams, Creston, Dahl, Denisov, Dubois, Glazunov, Husa, Ibert, Koch, Larsson, Maslanka, Muczynski, Salonen, Ticheli, Tomasi, J. Williams, Worley, Yoshimatsu
- Tenor saxophone Concerto: Bennett, Ewazen, Gould, Nicolau, Ward, Wilder.
- Baritone saxophone Concerto: Gaines, Glaser, Haas, van Beurden

===== Other woodwind instruments =====
20th century:

- Bagpipe: Chieftain's Salute by Graham Waterhouse

==== For brass instrument and orchestra ====
===== Trumpet concerto =====
20th century:

- Trumpet Concerto:
  - Aho
  - Arnold
  - Arutiunian
  - Böhme
  - Jolivet
  - Perry
  - Sandström
  - Ticheli
  - J. Williams
  - Zimmermann

===== Horn concerto =====
Classical era:

- Bohemian composer Francesco Antonio Rosetti composed several solo and double horn concertos. He was a significant contributor to the genre of horn concertos in the 18th century. Most of his horn concertos were composed between 1782 and 1789 for the Bohemian duo Franz Zwierzina and Joseph Nage while at the Bavarian court of Oettingen-Wallerstein. One of his best-known works in this genre is his Horn Concerto in E♭ major C49/K III:36. Many common features of the galant style are present in Rosetti's music and composing style. In his E♭ horn concerto, we hear periodic and short phrases, galant harmonic rhythm and melodic line reduction. Rosetti's influence on the 18th century composers, musicians and music was considerable. At the Bavarian court of Oettingen-Wallerstein, his music was often performed by the Wallerstein ensembles. In Paris, his compositions were performed by the best ensembles of the city, including the orchestra of the Concert Spirituel. His publishers were Le Menu et Boyer and Sieber. According to Mozart scholar H. C. Robbins Landon, Rosetti's horn concertos might have been a model for Mozart's horn concertos.

20th century:

- French horn concerto: Kalevi Aho, Malcolm Arnold, Alexander Arutiunian, Kurt Atterberg, York Bowen, Elliott Carter, Peter Maxwell Davies, Reinhold Glière, Ruth Gipps, Paul Hindemith, Alan Hovhaness, Gordon Jacob, Oliver Knussen, György Ligeti, Tristan Murail, Krzysztof Penderecki, Richard Strauss, Henri Tomasi, John Williams

===== Trombone concerto =====
20th century:

- Trombone concerto: Kalevi Aho, Derek Bourgeois, Ferdinand David (Trombone Concertino), Pascal Dusapin, Renaud Gagneux, Launy Grøndahl, Vagn Holmboe, Lars-Erik Larsson, Darius Milhaud, Michael Nyman, Ole Olsen, Nino Rota, Christopher Rouse, Jan Sandström, Henri Tomasi

===== Other brass instruments =====
20th century:

- Cornet concerto: Derek Bourgeois, Frederick Corder, Martin Ellerby, Edward Gregson, Elgar Howarth, Ernest Tomlinson, Denis Wright
- Euphonium concerto: Jan Bach, Derek Bourgeois, Nigel Clarke, Vladimir Cosma, James Curnow, Robert E. Jager, Kenneth Downie, Martin Ellerby, Eric Ewazen, Juraj Filas, David Gaines, David Gillingham, John Golland, Peter Graham, Edward Gregson, Robert Groslot, Alun Hoddinott, Joseph Horovitz, Karl Jenkins, Christian Lindberg, Jukka Linkola, Paul Mealorr, Andy Scott, Philip Sparke, John D. Stevens, Philip Wilby.
- Tuba Concerto: Aho, Arutiunian, Broughton, Gagneux, Holmboe, Vaughan Williams, J. Williams

==== Keyboard concerto ====
===== Harpsichord concerto =====
Baroque era:

- Harpsichord concertos, BWV 1052–1059 (Bach)

20th century:

- Harpsichord Concerto: Falla, Glass, Górecki, Nyman, Martinů, Poulenc

===== Organ concerto =====
Baroque era:

- Handel:
  - Organ concertos, Op.4
  - Organ concertos, Op.7

20th century:

- Organ concerto: Arnold, Hanson, Harrison, Hétu, Hindemith, Jongen, MacMillan, Peeters, Poulenc, Rorem, Sowerby

===== Piano concerto =====
Classical era:

- Mozart: Three Concertos after J. C. Bach, K. 107; Piano Concertos Nos 1–4; Piano Concertos Nos 5–27

Romantic era:

- Beethoven's five piano concertos increase the technical demands made on the soloist. The last two are particularly remarkable, integrating the concerto into a large symphonic structure with movements that frequently run into one another. His Piano Concerto No. 4 starts with a statement by the piano, after which the orchestra enters in a foreign key, to present what would normally be the opening tutti. The work has a lyrical character. The slow movement is a dramatic dialogue between the soloist and the orchestra. His Piano Concerto No. 5 has the basic rhythm of a Viennese military march. There is no lyrical second subject, but in its place a continuous development of the opening material.
- The piano concertos of Cramer, Field, Düssek, Woelfl, Ries, and Hummel provide a link from the Classical concerto to the Romantic concerto.
- Chopin wrote two piano concertos in which the orchestra is relegated to an accompanying role. Schumann, despite being a pianist-composer, wrote a piano concerto in which virtuosity is never allowed to eclipse the essential lyrical quality of the work. The gentle, expressive melody heard at the beginning on woodwind and horns (after the piano's heralding introductory chords) bears the material for most of the argument in the first movement. In fact, argument in the traditional developmental sense is replaced by a kind of variation technique in which soloist and orchestra interweave their ideas.
- Liszt's mastery of piano technique matched that of Paganini for the violin. His concertos No. 1 and No. 2 left a deep impression on the style of piano concerto writing, influencing Rubinstein, and especially Tchaikovsky, whose First Piano Concerto's rich chordal opening is justly famous.
- Grieg's concerto likewise begins in a striking manner after which it continues in a lyrical vein.
- Saint-Saëns wrote five piano concertos and orchestra between 1858 and 1896, in a classical vein.
- Brahms's First Piano Concerto in D minor (pub 1861) was the result of an immense amount of work on a mass of material originally intended for a symphony. His Second Piano Concerto in B♭ major (1881) has four movements and is written on a larger scale than any earlier concerto. Like his violin concerto, it is symphonic in proportions.
- Fewer piano concertos were written in the late Romantic Period. But Sergei Rachmaninoff wrote four piano concertos between 1891 and 1926. His Second and Third, being the most popular of the four, went on to become among the most famous in the piano repertoire.
- Other romantic piano concertos, like those by Kalkbrenner, Henri Herz, Moscheles and Thalberg were also very popular in the Romantic era, but not today.

20th century:

- Maurice Ravel wrote two pianos concertos, one in G-major (1931) and the second for the left hand in D-major (date of creation1932).
- Igor Stravinsky wrote three works for solo piano and orchestra:
  - Concerto for Piano and Wind Instruments
  - Capriccio for Piano and Orchestra
  - Movements for Piano and Orchestra
- Sergei Prokofiev, another Russian composer, wrote five piano concertos, which he himself performed.
- Dmitri Shostakovich composed two piano concertos.
- Aram Khachaturian contributed to the repertoire with a piano concerto and a Concerto-Rhapsody.
- Arnold Schoenberg's Piano Concerto is a well-known example of a dodecaphonic piano concerto.
- Béla Bartók also wrote three piano concertos. Like their violin counterparts, they show the various stages in his musical development. Bartok's also rearranged his chamber piece, Sonata for Two Pianos and Percussion, into a Concerto for Two Pianos and Percussion, adding orchestral accompaniment.
- Cristóbal Halffter wrote a prize-winning neoclassical Piano Concerto in 1953, and a second Piano Concerto in 1987–88.
- Ralph Vaughan Williams wrote a concerto for piano, though it was later reworked as a concerto for two pianos and orchestra—both versions have been recorded
- Benjamin Britten's concerto for piano (1938) is a prominent work from his early period.
- Piano concertos by Latin-American composers include one by Carlos Chávez, two by Alberto Ginastera, and five by Heitor Villa-Lobos.
- György Ligeti's concerto (1988) has a synthetic quality: it mixes complex rhythms, the composer's Hungarian roots and his experiments with micropolyphony from the 1960s and 1970s.
- Witold Lutosławski's piano concerto, completed in the same year, alternates between playfulness and mystery. It also displays a partial return to melody after the composer's aleatoric period.
- Russian composer Rodion Shchedrin has written six piano concertos.
- Finnish composer Einojuhani Rautavaara wrote three piano concertos, the third one dedicated to Vladimir Ashkenazy, who played and conducted the world première.
- French composer Germaine Tailleferre and Czech composers Bohuslav Martinů and Vítězslava Kaprálová wrote piano concertos.

===== Accordion concerto =====
20th century:

- Accordion concerto: Hovhaness, Sofia Gubaidulina, Toshio Hosokawa, Kalevi Aho
- Free bass accordion Concerto: John Serry Sr.

===== Other keyboard instruments =====
20th century:

- Bandoneon concerto: Ástor Piazzolla
- Clavinet concerto: Randall Woolf
- Yamaha GX-1: Yasushi Akutagawa

==== Other instrumental soloist ====
===== Percussion instrument =====
20th century:

- Percussion concerto: Aho, Dorman, Glass, Jolivet, MacMillan, Milhaud, Rautavaara, Susman
- Timpani concerto: Aho, Druschetzky, Glass, Kraft, Rosauro
- Xylophone concerto: Mayuzumi
- Marimba concerto: Creston, Larsen, Milhaud, Rosauro (Concerto No.1 and No.2), Svoboda, Viñao
- Vibraphone: Rosauro (Concerto No.1 and Concerto No.2)

===== Free reed aerophone =====
20th century:

- Harmonica concerto: Arnold, Hovhaness, Vaughan Williams, Villa-Lobos
- Sheng Concerto: Unsuk Chin, Bernd Richard Deutsch, Jukka Tiensuu, Man Fang .

===== Electronic musical instrument =====
20th century:

- Ondes Martenot concerto: Jolivet, Rozsa
- Theremin concerto: Aho

=== For multiple instruments and orchestra ===
In the Baroque era, two violins and one cello formed the standard concertino of a concerto grosso. In the classical era, the sinfonia concertante replaced the concerto grosso genre, although concertos for two or three soloists were still composed too. From the Romantic era works for multiple instrumental soloists and orchestra were again commonly called concerto.

==== Two soloists ====
Baroque era:

- Vivaldi's concertos for 2 violins, for 2 cellos, for 2 mandolins, for 2 trumpets, for 2 flutes, for oboe and bassoon, for cello and bassoon, for viola d'amore and lute (etc.)
- Bach:
  - Concerto for Two Violins
  - Concertos for two harpsichords: BWV 1060, 1061 and 1062
- Telemann's Concerto for Two Violas

Classical era:

- Haydn's concerto for violin and keyboard (usually referred to as the Keyboard Concerto No. 6)
- Mozart:
  - Piano Concerto No. 10
  - Concerto for Flute, Harp, and Orchestra
- Salieri's double concerto for flute and oboe

Romantic era:

- Felix Mendelssohn:
  - Concerto for Two Pianos and Orchestra in E major
  - Concerto for Two Pianos and Orchestra in A♭ major
- Johannes Brahms's Double Concerto for violin and cello
- Max Bruch:
  - Concerto for Clarinet, Viola, and Orchestra
  - Concerto for Two Pianos and Orchestra

20th century:

- Dmitri Shostakovich's Piano Concerto No. 1 (soloists: piano, trumpet)
- Malcolm Arnold's Concerto for Two Violins and String Orchestra
- Francis Poulenc's Concerto for Two Pianos and Orchestra
- Ralph Vaughan Williams's Concerto for Two Pianos and Orchestra
- Elliott Carter's Double Concerto for Harpsichord and Piano with Two Chamber Orchestras
- Peter Maxwell Davies's Strathclyde Concerto No. 3 for horn, trumpet and orchestra, and No. 4 for violin, viola and string orchestra

==== Three soloists ====
Baroque era:

- Arcangelo Corelli's twelve concerti grossi, Op. 6 for two violins and cello
- Vivaldi's concertos for 3 violins
- Bach:
  - Brandenburg Concertos Nos. 4 (BWV 1049) and 5 (BWV 1050)
  - Concertos for three harpsichords: BWV 1063 and 1064
  - Triple Concerto, BWV 1044, for harpsichord, flute and violin

Classical era:

- Mozart's Piano Concerto No. 7

Romantic era:

- Beethoven's Triple Concerto for piano, violin, and cello.

20th century:

- Frank Martin's Petite symphonie concertante for harp, harpsichord, piano, and two string orchestras

21st century:

- Smirnov's Triple Concerto No. 2

==== Four or more soloists ====
Baroque era:

- Vivaldi:
  - L'estro armonico Nos. 1, 4, 7 and 10
  - RV 555, featuring 3 violins, an oboe, 2 recorders, 2 viole all'inglese, a chalumeau, 2 cellos, 2 harpsichords and 2 trumpets.
  - Concerto for Diverse Instruments in C major, RV 558
  - Concerto in C major, RV 559, for two oboes, two clarinets, strings and continuo
- Bach:
  - Brandenburg Concertos Nos. 1 (BWV 1046) and 2 (BWV 1047)
  - Concerto for 4 harpsichords, BWV 1065 (after a concerto for four violins by Vivaldi)

20th century:

- Arnold Schoenberg's Concerto for String Quartet and Orchestra
- Maxwell Davies's Strathclyde Concerto and No. 9 for piccolo, alto flute, cor anglais, E♭ clarinet, bass clarinet, contrabassoon and string orchestra.
- Frank Martin's Concerto for seven wind instruments, timpani, percussion, and string orchestra.
- Jon Lord's Concerto for Group and Orchestra for rock band.
- Joaquín Rodrigo's Concierto Andaluz for 4 guitars.
- Alfred Schnittke's Concerto Grosso No. 3
- Olivier Messiaen's Concert à quatre for piano, cello, oboe and flute.

=== Concerto for orchestra ===
==== Symphonic orchestra ====
In the 20th and 21st centuries, several composers wrote concertos for orchestra. In these works, different sections and/or instruments of the orchestra or concert band are treated at one point or another as soloists with emphasis on solo sections and/or instruments changing during the piece. Some examples include those written by:

- Hindemith – Op. 38, 1925
- Kodály – 1940
- Bartók – Concerto for Orchestra – 1945
- Lutoslawski – Concerto for Orchestra – 1954
- Shchedrin
  - No. 1 Naughty Limericks (1963)
  - No. 2 The Chimes (1968)
  - No. 3 Old Russian Circus Music (1989)
  - No. 4 Round Dances (Khorovody) (1989)
  - No. 5 Four Russian Songs (1998)
- Carter – 1969
- Knussen – 1969
- Lindberg – 2003

Dutilleux has also described his Métaboles as a concerto for orchestra.

==== Chamber orchestra or string orchestra ====
Baroque era:

- Vivaldi's Concerto alla rustica
- Bach's Brandenburg Concertos Nos. 3 (BWV 1048) and 6 (BWV 1051)

20th century:

- Stravinsky:
  - Concerto in D
  - Dumbarton Oaks concerto

==== More than one orchestra ====
Baroque era:

- Handel's Concerti a due cori, HWV 332–334

20th century:

- Michael Tippett: Concerto for Double String Orchestra
