= King's College Harmonica Band =

Hong Kong harmonica ensemble

King's College Harmonica Band (KCHB), founded in 1951, is one of the oldest harmonica ensembles in Hong Kong.

== History ==
King's College Harmonica Band was established in 1951 by a group of harmonica enthusiasts. It consisted of only a few members initially. In the 60's, under the baton of Fung On, the band began to expand in scale and winning an enviable reputation by means of their marvelous performances. At that time, KCHB consisted of over thirty members. Through their efforts, they had won numerous prizes in the Hong Kong Schools Music Festival during these years. Mr. Fung left the band in the 60s and the band's repute started to wane. Hui Yau Fong took the baton a few years later. He reorganized the band and enthusiastically nurtured the new generation intending to retrieve the band's glorious prospects.

Between 1981 and 1985, KCHB was ushering in a significant stage of its development. Under the baton of Ho Pak Cheong, Chan Kai Wah, Chan Shu Keung, Mok Chi Chiu, and Lau Chun Bong, the band had won championships in most of the categories in the successive Hong Kong Schools Music Festivals. Ho Pak Cheong was a remarkable figure in KCHB's development in the 80s who assumed the office of conductor-in-chief in 1988. His contributions had given rise to their outstanding achievements during his time.

Ho Pak Cheong departed from the stage in the 90s and the baton went to a King's College alumni Johnny Kuan. He was intending to nurture new blood with his zealous endeavors and pushing the band toward another pinnacle of its history. From 1989 to 1993, he had witnessed the claim of the title of champion five times in a row in the Concert Work of Harmonica Solo of the Hong Kong Schools Music Festival. In 1991, KCHB presented its 40th Anniversary Concert in Shouson Theatre of Hong Kong Arts Centre, which was their first public concert. The success and the subsequent acclaim of the concert were arousing the period of "harmonica kick" among professionals and amateurs alike. Shortly after that, the ongoing development of KCHB was left in the hands of Fung Sui Tsan, the next chairman. The year 1996 saw the return of Mr. Kuan as the conductor. He presented in their 45th Anniversary celebration concert at the Drama Theatre of Hong Kong Academy for Performing Arts. In 2001, KCHB held a concert at Hong Kong City Hall Concert Hall to celebrate the Diamond Anniversary of the King's College and the Golden Anniversary of the Harmonica Band. In the concert, KCHB world premiered the commissioned work "Jubilee Overture" which was composed by a renowned local composer, Hui Cheung Wai.

KCHB amassed a reputation participating in the World Harmonica Festival and Asia Pacific Harmonica Festival, winning numerous awards; in 1998, 2000, 2002, and 2004, the band participated in the Asia Pacific Harmonica Festival held in Kuala Lumpur, Seoul, Atsugi, Hong Kong, and Taipei; in 2005, KCHB members together with some alumni, made their European début by entering the World Harmonica Festival held in the "Town of Harmonica" – Trossingen, Germany.

Nowadays, KCHB is a harmonica orchestra consisting of more than forty members. All these members are deemed experienced and prospective players. They are intending to continue their tradition, in the meanwhile, encouraging more citizens to get in touch with harmonica music.

== Current Awards ==
The band has actively participated in numerous competitions worldwide achieving distinctive results.

Competition	Year	City	Prize Awarded
9th Asia Pacific Harmonica Festival	2012	Kuala Lumpur	Champion
World Harmonica Festival	2013	Trossingen	Champion
Hong Kong Schools Music Festival	2014	Hong Kong	Champion
