= SPAH =

SPAH can be an abbreviation for:

- The Society for the Preservation and Advancement of the Harmonica
- Stacked pairs of alpha helices, a term for the alpha solenoid protein fold
