= Bobino (TV series) =

Canadian French-language children's television series

- Bobino (Guy Sanche) and Bobinette (voiced and handled by Christine Lamer) on the 1983 set
- Created by: Guy Sanche
- Starring: Guy Sanche; Paule Bayard (1961-1973); Christine Lamer (1973-1985)
- Theme music composer: Dwight Barker
- Country of origin: Canada
- Original language: French
- No. of seasons: 28
- No. of episodes: 5,170

Production
- Producer: Société Radio-Canada
- Running time: 12 minutes per episode live action, 12 minutes cartoons

Original release
- Network: SRC
- Release: May 23, 1957 – June 14, 1985

Bobino is a Quebec French language children's television show made in Quebec and broadcast on Radio Canada, the French language television service of the Canadian Broadcasting Corporation, between 1957 and 1985. Its stories revolved around Bobino (a kind gentleman played by Guy Sanche) and his sister Bobinette (a puppet voiced by Paule Bayard and later by Christine Lamer). The cast is complemented by a number of other characters which never appear on screen but who interact with the cast by visual or audible cues.

== History ==
Bobino was created in 1957 as the host and presenter of animated shorts by Guy Sanche, the star of the show. At first, the show was unscripted, and Sanche created a number of imaginary characters to interact with and play against such as Camério, the personification of the camera, who could answer by nodding or shaking its "head" or Gustave, the noisy and distracting ghost created by accident when a stage operator dropped a set of keys on the set during the (then) live filming.

In 1959, Michel Cailloux joined the production team to write new scenarios which had been written entirely by Sanche until that point. Cailloux introduced a number of new characters over the years, including Bobinette the boisterous little sister of Bobino and Giovanni a friend of Bobinette introduced in 1980.

Bobinette was originally handled and voiced by Paule Bayard, who became gravely ill in 1973. Christine Lamer took the character over starting at the end of the 1972-1973 season until the show's end.

Radio-Canada ended the show in 1985 causing a flurry of protest and petitions to keep it on the air. However, Sanche's health was deteriorating and he was no longer able to continue hosting the show. Sanche died three years later of cancer.

== Format ==
The show centered on the interaction between Bobino and his sister, who would either come up with elaborate schemes for pranks to play on her brother (who would often get the last laugh by coming up with a prank of his own and turning the tables); or with Bobinette getting into trouble of her own making from which Bobino would rescue her, not without passing the opportunity for a lesson or moral.

The live action segments were cut in three acts, separated by two animated shorts. Among the various animated shorts, episodes of Paddington and the original French version of The Magic Roundabout were shown. Also shown were serializations of Les adventures de Tintin.

== Music theme ==
The music used over the credits of Bobino is named Double March and is credited to composer Dwight Barker. Dwight Barker is in fact the penname of the compositor duo formed by Tommy Reilly and James Moody.

== Adaptations ==
Bobino et Botinette were adapted into a comic strip by Norbert Fersen.
