= Brett Deubner =

American violist (born 1968)

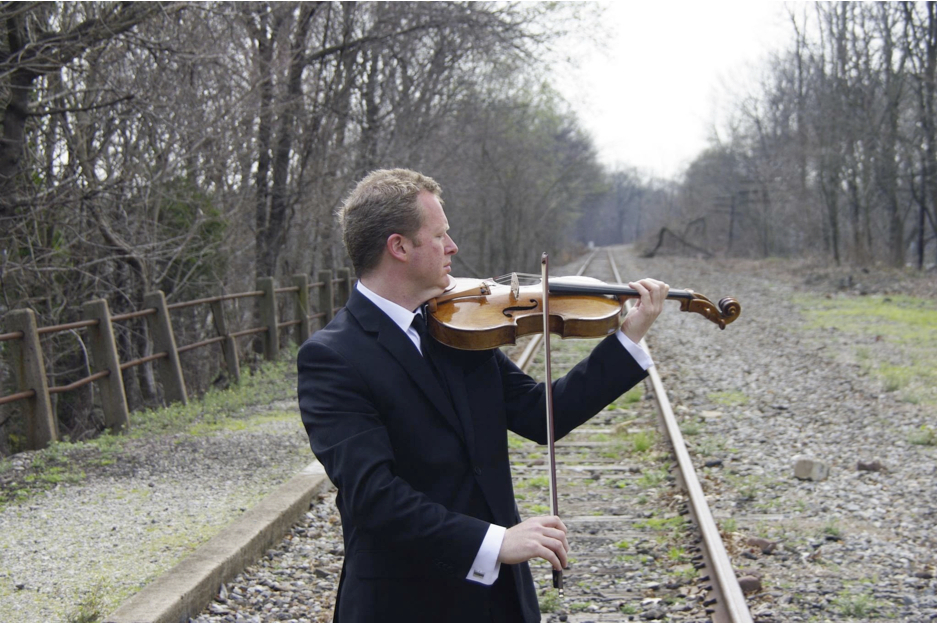

Background information
- Born: March 31, 1968 (age 58); Berkeley, California, United States
- Occupation: violist
- Instrument: viola
- Website: www.brettdeubner.com

Brett Deubner (born March 31, 1968, Berkeley, California) is an American violist. He has performed as concerto soloist with over 70 orchestras on four continents.

== Early life ==
Growing up his primary teachers were violinists Melvin Ritter and Fredell Lack, both star pupils of Ivan Galamian at the Juilliard School in New York City. Deubner studied both violin and viola at the Eastman School of Music in Rochester, New York, where his primary teachers were Zvi Zeitlin, Martha Katz, the Cleveland Quartet and John Graham.

== Career and performances ==
Deubner has performed as a soloist with orchestras all over the world.

- In the USA: Grand Rapids Symphony, Peninsula Symphony, New Jersey Symphony Orchestra, Missoula Symphony and Knoxville Symphony, among others.
- In South America, with orchestras from Ecuador, Venezuela, Brazil, Mexico and Argentina.
- In Europe, with Orchestre Bel'Arte of Paris, the Thüringer Symphoniker of Saalfeld, Germany, the National Chamber Orchestra of Ukraine and orchestras from Italy, Denmark and Bulgaria.
- Australia, with Percy Grainger Wind Symphony, Melbourne

Grammy winning composers such as Lalo Schifrin, Carlos Franzetti, and Richard Danielpour have written viola concerti for Brett Deubner.

As of 2017, Deubner has had over 80 works for viola including 37 viola concerti and numerous solo and chamber works for viola written for him. He has recorded 15 CDs including concertos of Trent Johnson, Frank Lewin, and Andrew Rudin, and made chamber music recordings for string quartet, harp trio, clarinet/viola/piano trio, viola/guitar duo and 5 viola/piano CDs.

== Collaborations ==
He has collaborated with leading conductors as Perry So, Anne Manson, Lucas Richman, Patricio Aizaga, David Lockington, Oliver Weder and Rossen Milanov.

As a chamber music collaborator, Deubner has performed with violinists Pinchas Zukerman, Timothy Fain, Gregory Fulkerson, Stefan Milenkovich and Dimitry Sitkovetsky, the Tokyo Quartet, Claremont Trio, the Vermeer Quartet; pianists Joseph Kalichstein, Jeffrey Swann and Robert Koenig; cellists Wendy Warner and Sarah Sant’Ambrogio; clarinetists Guy Deplus and Alexander Fiterstein; flutists Carol Wincenc and Ransom Wilson; New York Philharmonic former principal oboist Joseph Robinson and Dallas Symphony principal oboist Erin Hannigan.

During 2017, Deubner will record and premiere Grammy-award-winning composer Richard Danielpour’s viola concerto being specifically written for him.

== Social accomplishments ==
Deubner instructs young violists on the faculty at the Aaron Copland School of Music at Queens College in New York.

Besides, he is the Artistic Director of the concert series Music and More serving the NYC metropolitan area; he also serves as the faculty of the Round Top Festival Institute in Texas and the Gramado in Concert International Music Festival in Brazil.

Deubner provides master clinics in the USA and abroad.

=== Private life ===
Deubner lives in Glen Ridge, New Jersey, with his four children.
