= Ney Rosauro =

Brazilian composer and percussionist

Ney Rosauro (born 1952) is a Brazilian composer and percussionist.

His compositions include solo works written for marimba, vibraphone, and multi-percussion, as well as several concerti for solo percussion and orchestra. A common theme in his work is the use of traditional Brazilian rhythm and melodies.

Rosauro studied composition and conducting at the University of Brasília, where he received a bachelor's degree. He then attended the Hochschule für Musik Würzburg, where he studied with Siegfried Fink, achieving a master's degree.

He was previously the Director of Percussion at the Federal University of Santa Maria from 1987 to 2000 before moving to the United States to teach at the University of Miami from 2000 to 2009. He was inducted into the Percussive Arts Society Hall of Fame in 2023.

His work, Concerto No. 1 for Marimba and String Orchestra, was written in 1986 and has become one of the most frequently played marimba concertos worldwide.
