= Didrimys harmonica =

Scientific classification
- Kingdom: Animalia
- Phylum: Arthropoda
- Class: Insecta
- Order: Lepidoptera
- Family: Tortricidae
- Genus: Didrimys
- Species: D. harmonica

Binomial name
- Didrimys harmonica (Meyrick, 1905)

Synonyms
- Platypeplus harmonica Meyrick, 1905; Argyroploce harmonica Diakonoff, 1949; Argyroploce crocospila Meyrick, 1939; Olethreutes crocospila Clarke, 1958; Didrimys harmonica Diakonoff, 1973

Species of moth

Didrimys harmonica is a moth of the family Tortricidae first described by Edward Meyrick in 1905. It is found in Sri Lanka, Java, Borneo and New Guinea.

Larval food plants are Eugenia subglauca, Eugenia polyantha and Psidium guajava.
