= Alan Langford =

Alan Langford was the pen name of Alan Owen (28 February 1928 – 9 February 2011) a British radio producer and composer of light music.

Born in London, he studied at the Guildhall School of Music and Drama with Benjamin Frankel. For many years he was a BBC music producer for programmes such as Matinée Musicale and Friday Night is Music Night, and thus used his pseudonym to disguise his sideline in composition. He is no relation of fellow light composer Gordon Langford.

He is known for works such as Diversion and Interludes, the Three Amusements, Little French Suite, Riding High, Petite Promenade (a staple of the BBC Test Card transmission music repertoire), the Waltz for String Orchestra, the Concertante for Harmonica and Strings (written in 1981 for Tommy Reilly), the Two Worlds Overture and the Pastoral Scherzetto. Many of his pieces were written for the recorded music libraries, and according to Philip Lane, his compositions were frequently used for the crime serials of Edgar Lustgarten in the 1950s and 1960s.
