= Denys Bouliane =

Canadian composer and conductor

- Born: May 8, 1955 (age 71); Grand-Mère, Quebec
- Occupations: Canadian composer and conductor

Denys Bouliane (born May 8, 1955) is a Canadian composer and conductor. He is a Professor of Composition at McGill University.

== Early life and education ==
Bouliane was born in Grand-Mère, Quebec. He is a graduate of Laval University (B.Mus 1977 and M.Mus in 1979). He studied music composition in the Neue Musik Theater class of Mauricio Kagel in Cologne followed by studies with György Ligeti until 1985.

== Career ==
In 1987 Bouliane was awarded the Jules Léger Prize for New Chamber Music for À propos... et le baron perché.

Bouliane was composer in residence from 1992 - 1995 for l'Orchestre Symphonique de Québec and between 1995 and 1996 for the Heidelberg Philharmonisches Orchester. In 1995 he became Professor of composition at McGill University.

In 1997 Bouliane became the director and conductor of the Contemporary Music Ensemble. In the 1990s he organized the festivals Montréal Nouvelles-Musiques and MusiMars.

In 2003 Bouliane was composer-in residence at the National Arts Center Orchestra in Ottawa; the orchestra performed his composition "Snow Is White, but Water Is Black" in November that year.

Bouliane has received commissions from various ensembles including the Montreal Symphony Orchestra, Trio Fibonacci, Bozzini Quartet, Goethe Institute of San Francisco, and Pinchas Zukerman.

In 2006 he was composer-in-residence for the National Arts Centre Orchestra.

== Works ==
Denys Bouliane's major works include:

- Le Cactus rieur et la demoiselle qui souffrait d'une soif insatiable
- Concerto for Orchestra (Variations without a theme)
- Concerti for various instruments
- Wind quintet
- Jeux de société for wind quintet and piano

== See also ==
- List of Canadian composers
