= David Gaines (composer) =

American composer (born 1961)

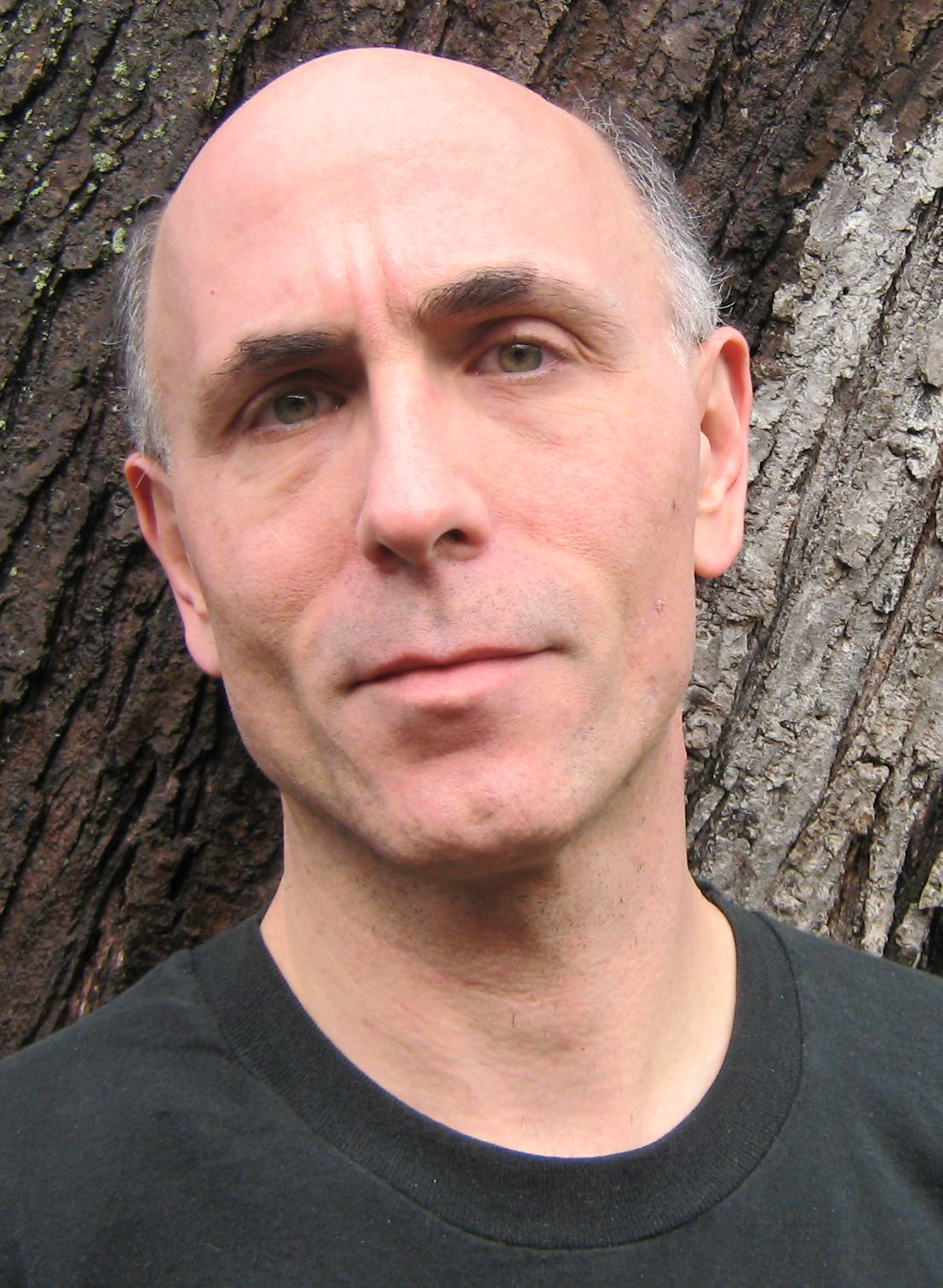
- Born: October 20, 1961 (age 65); Stamford, Connecticut
- Occupation: Music composer
- Known for: Use of the international language Esperanto
- Notable work: Symphony No. 1 ("Esperanto"), The Lion Of Panjshir (Symphony No. 2)

David Gaines (born October 20, 1961) is an American composer.

== Biography ==
He wrote the first orchestral symphony to incorporate texts written in Esperanto, and an Esperanto choral song, Povas Plori Mi Ne Plu ("I Can Cry No Longer"), which concerns the former military situation in Bosnia and Herzegovina. This song won First Prize at the 1995 World Esperanto Association's Belartaj Konkursoj (competitions in the field of Belles lettres) in Tampere. Gaines holds degrees in music composition from Northwestern University, American University, and Johns Hopkins University's Peabody Conservatory of Music.

His Esperanto symphony, available as a CD with Vit Micka conducting and Kimball Wheeler singing mezzo-soprano, was premiered by the Moravian Philharmonic in Olomouc, Czech Republic in October 2000. The four movements feature texts originally written by renowned Esperantists including L. L. Zamenhof and Marjorie Boulton, as well as Bulgarian poet Penka Papazova and Gaines himself. Within the Esperanto movement, Gaines serves as an advisory board member of the Esperantic Studies Foundation and holds the title of Honorary President of the Music Esperanto League (Muzika Esperanto-Ligo).
