= Joseph Robinson (oboist) =

American oboist (born 1940)

Joseph Robinson (born 1940) is an American oboist most known for serving as the principal oboe with the New York Philharmonic from 1978 to 2005. During the same time period, he also taught at the Manhattan School of Music and served as department chair for oboe studies.

Robinson studied with famous oboists John Mack and Marcel Tabuteau. His career as an oboist began effectively with his appointment by music director Robert Shaw to the principal chair of the Atlanta Symphony in 1967. From 1974 to 1978 he was instructor of oboe at the North Carolina School of the Arts, during which time he served as a member of the Clarion Woodwind Quintet and the Piedmont Chamber Orchestra. He also served as volunteer principal oboe and member of the board of directors of the Winston-Salem Symphony (in Winston-Salem, North Carolina). He won the New York Philharmonic principal oboe audition in December, 1977.

During his career, Robinson has also held multi-year positions with the Grand Teton Music Festival (in Jackson Hole, WY) and Bellingham Festival of Music in Bellingham, WA. He helped create the John Mack Oboe Camp (named for his former teacher) in Little Switzerland, North Carolina. He has performed as a soloist with many orchestras and chamber groups around the world. His playing is featured on the solo album New York Legends Series: Joseph Robinson, Principal Oboe, New York Philharmonic, as well as recordings with the New York Philharmonic and Elysium String Quartet.

Since retiring from the New York Philharmonic, Robinson has held artist-in-residence roles with Duke University and Lynn University's Conservatory of Music.
