= Hong Kong Schools Music Festival =

Hong Kong Schools Music Festival (Traditional Chinese: 香港校際音樂節 Jyutping: hoeng1 gong2 haau6 zai3 jam1 ngok6 zit3 Simplified Chinese: 香港校际音乐节 Pinyin: xiāng gǎng xiào jì yīn yuè jié) was first held in 1949, and is held between February and March every year. The festival is managed by the Hong Kong Schools Music and Speech Association, which also organizes the Hong Kong Schools Speech Festival. Schools in Hong Kong compete in the festival for prizes.

== Awards ==
Each participant receives a transcript with scores and comments which are written by judges in order to exchange their certificates. The participant who gets the highest score in each competition (except the final competition) is awarded with a multicolored silk banner and has a chance of being invited to deliver a performance. The number of runners-up and the bronze medalists are not limited, so it often can be seen that there are several runners-up and bronze medalists at the same time. The scores of All prize-winners are expected to receive a score of more than 80, or no award is rewarded.
