= Renaud Gagneux =

French composer (1947–2018)

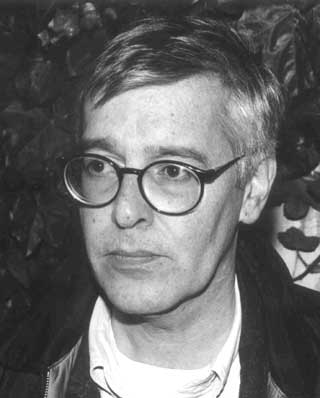
Renaud Gagneux

Renaud Gagneux (French pronunciation: [ʁəno gaɲø]; 15 May 1947 – 24 January 2018) was a French composer.

Gagneux studied piano with Alfred Cortot and composition with Henri Dutilleux at the École Normale in Paris. In 1966 he went to Cologne to study composition with Karlheinz Stockhausen, then with André Jolivet and Olivier Messiaen at the Conservatoire de Paris, where he won first prize in composition in 1972. In 1972 he joined the Groupe de Recherches Musicales de l'ORTF. His numerous prizes include the Sacem Grand Prix for chamber music (1977), the Prix Georges Enesco (1983), the Prize for New Talent from the SACD (1989), the Composers' Prize of the Sacem (1990), and the SACEM Grand Prix 1993 for his works overall.

His death was announced on 25 January 2018.

== Compositions (selective list) ==
- Concerto for Double-bass and Orchestra, op. 6 (1981)
- Concerto for Tuba, Piano, and Orchestra, op. 9 (1982–83)
- Concerto for Viola and Orchestra, op. 51 (1997)
- Duo for Violin and Viola (1973)
- Requiem (1982) ISWC T-003.042.605.1
- Les échos de la mémoire, op. 13, for orchestra (1985)
- String Quartet no. 1, op. 15 (1986)
- String Quartet no. 2, op. 16 (1986)
- Qamar, op. 20, string quintet and string orchestra (1988)
- String Quartet no. 3, op. 23, 1989
- Triptyque for cello and orchestra, op. 24 (1989)
- Haec Anima …, for 12 or 24 Double-basses (1992)
- Mass, op. 42, for organ (1994)
- "Narandj" op.38a for harp
