= Harmonica Slim =

American singer

- Born: Travis Leonard Blaylock; December 21, 1934; Texarkana, Texas, United States
- Died: June 16, 1984 (aged 49) Texarkana, Texas, United States
- Genres: Texas blues, country blues
- Occupations: Harmonicist, singer, songwriter
- Instruments: Harmonica, vocals
- Years active: Mid-1940s – late 1970s

Travis Leonard Blaylock (December 21, 1934 – June 16, 1984), better known as Harmonica Slim, was an American blues harmonicist, singer and songwriter. He had some commercial success in the 1950s; recordings of two songs he wrote, "Mary Helen" and "You Better Believe It" (both 1956), were modest hits. He released a total of six singles and toured alongside Percy Mayfield, Harmonica Fats, B.B. King, T-Bone Walker, Pee Wee Crayton and Ray Charles. His debut album was released in 1969. By the late 1970s, he had stopped playing the blues.

He is not to be confused with (as he has been in some sources) two other similarly named artists, James Isaac Moore (better known as Slim Harpo) and Richard Riley Riggins (1921–2003).

== Biography ==
Blaylock was born in Texarkana, Texas. With encouragement from his neighbors, and by listening to records by Sonny Boy Williamson I, he became competent playing the harmonica by the age of twelve. He joined a gospel group, the Sunny South Gospel Singers, in the mid-1940s, and they performed on a local radio station, KCMC. In 1949, Harmonica Slim moved to Los Angeles, California, where he started to perform with several local blues groups. Through this work, gaining experience and local connections, he began playing in package shows including working part-time with the pianist Lloyd Glenn in Lowell Fulson's band.

Harmonica Slim also worked as a session musician in the early to mid-1950s, playing in recording sessions for various record labels, including Aladdin, Spry, and Vita. Eventually he formed his own band, which reunited him with Lloyd Glenn, and between 1954 and 1960 Harmonica Slim recorded six singles. His style combined Texas blues, country blues and R&B. "Mary Helen" and "You Better Believe It" (both 1956) became modest local hits. The success of these records had two effects. First, Harmonica Slim was given the opportunity to join R&B tour packages that travelled across the United States in the 1950s, in which he performed in the company of Percy Mayfield, Harmonica Fats, B.B. King, T-Bone Walker, Pee Wee Crayton and Ray Charles. Second, another "Harmonica Slim" on the blues circuit changed his working name to Slim Harpo. Around this time, through Slim's working association with the more rotund Harvey Blackston, the latter changed his stage name to Harmonica Fats.

In the 1960s, Harmonica Slim found that regular work as a musician was scarce, and he took a job in a factory. However, in 1969, T-Bone Walker introduced him to the record producer Bob Thiele, who used a company of jazz and R&B musicians, including the saxophonist Plas Johnson, to work with him on his debut album, The Return of Harmonica Slim, released by Bluestime Records. In a strange twist of fate, Thiele found Harmonica Slim's harmonica style too rural and primitive for his purpose. He replaced Slim's parts by the more jazz-flavoured stylings of George "Harmonica" Smith, whom Thiele had previously recorded several times.

By 1971, after the death of his father, Harmonica Slim returned home to Texarkana to care for his ailing mother. He worked in a gas station. He also joined a local band, including the guitar player Nelson Carson, and recorded an album's worth of material in 1976, but these recordings have never been issued. After the death of his mother, Harmonica Slim stopped playing altogether. He returned to his religious roots and became a minister at his local Baptist church.

Harmonica Slim died of stomach cancer on June 16, 1984, in Texarkana, aged 49.

== Discography ==
=== All released tracks ===
- "Thought I Didn't Love You" (1954)
- "Going Back Home" (1954)
- "Mary Helen" (1956)
- "Lonely Hours" (1956)
- "My Girl Won’t Quit Me" (1956)
- "You Better Believe It" (1956)
- "Drop Anchor" (1956)
- "Do What You Want to Do" (1956)
- "I'll Take Love (1960)
- "Hard Times" (1960)
- "Buddah" (1960)
- "You" (1960)
- "Stormy Monday Blues" (1969)
- "Harmonica Boogaloo (1969)
- "Tin Pan Alley" (1969)
- "Love" (1969)
- "That's All Right" (1969)
- "You Better Believe It" (1969)
- "Things Ain’t What They Used to Be" (1969)
- "Darling I Love You" (1969)

=== Album ===
Year of release	Album title	Record label
1969	The Return of Harmonica Slim	Bluestime Records

== See also ==
- List of electric blues musicians
- List of harmonica blues musicians
