= Frank Lewin =

American composer

Frank Lewin (March 27, 1925 – January 18, 2008) was an American composer and teacher.

== Biography ==
Frank Lewin was born March 27, 1925, in Breslau, Germany. He and his family escaped from Germany in 1939, spent a year in Cuba, and came to the United States in 1940. Lewin studied composition with Felix Deyo at the Baldwin Conservatory (Long Island, New York); Jack Frederick Kilpatrick and Hans David at Southern Methodist University; Roy Harris in Logan, Utah; and Richard Donovan and Paul Hindemith at the Yale School of Music, where he received his Bachelor of Music degree in 1951.

Lewin composed and edited music for feature, documentary, and television films, including dozens of original scores for The Defenders and The Nurses. He wrote incidental music for plays from William Shakespeare to Tennessee Williams, and composed scores for historical outdoor dramas by Paul Green and others, in various parts of the country. He also wrote a number of concert compositions including two operas, several orchestral works, concertos for viola and harmonica, song cycles, and choral music.

Lewin was a professor at the Yale School of Music from 1971 to 1992, teaching composition for film; and at the Columbia University School of the Arts from 1975 to 1989, where he taught the course "Music in Modern Media."

Lewin lived in Princeton, New Jersey from 1956 until his death on January 18, 2008.

== Works ==
Operas

- Gulliver, an opera in two acts, with some sections composed by Easley Blackwood and Elliot Kaplan (1975)
- Burning Bright, based on the novel and play by John Steinbeck (1993)

Orchestral

- Evocation (1960)
- Concerto for Harmonica and Orchestra, (1960)
- Concerto Armonico, viola and orchestra (1960); revision and transcription of the Harmonica Concerto by violist Brett Deubner (2006)
- Concerto on Silesian Tunes, viola concerto (1965)

Instrumental

- Dunlap's Creek, for organ and English horn (1953)
- Music for the New Family of Violins, for the eight instruments designed and built by Carleen Hutchins (1965)

Choral

- Psalm 121 (1942)
- Psalm 148 (1949)
- Psalm 137 (1956)
- Behold, How Good (1959)
- Seasons (1962)
- Music for the White House (1965)
- Requiem for Robert F. Kennedy (Mass for the Dead, in English) (1969)

Solo vocal music

- Shall I Compare Thee (1949)
- A Dutch Lullaby, setting of the poem Wynken, Blynken, and Nod (1952)
- Innocence and Experience, poetry from Songs of Innocence and Experience by William Blake (1961)
- Variations of Greek Themes, poetry by Edwin Arlington Robinson (1977)
- A Musical Nashery, poetry by Ogden Nash (1980)
- Wedding Music setting of the Song of Solomon (1981)
- Phoenix (1993)
- She Walks in Beauty, setting of the poem by Lord Byron (1994)

Theater music

- The Trojan War Will Not Take Place by Jean Giraudoux (1952)
- Theater of the Soul by Nikolai Evreinov (1953)
- Summer and Smoke by Tennessee Williams (1954)
- The Tempest by William Shakespeare (1955)
- Knight of the Burning Pestle by Beaumont and Fletcher (1955)
- Twelfth Night by William Shakespeare (1956)
- Taming of the Shrew by William Shakespeare (1957)
- Blood Wedding by Federico García Lorca (1957)
- A Midsummer Night's Dream by William Shakespeare (1958)
- Thieves' Carnival by Jean Anouilh (1958)
- Leonce and Lena by Georg Büchner (1958)
- The Tempest by William Shakespeare (1967)
- Caesar at the Rubicon by Theodore White (1971)
- Streets of Gold by Tom DeTitta (1992)

Historical outdoor dramas

- Beyond the Sundown by Kermit Hunter (1975)
- The McIntosh Trail by Kermit Hunter (1976)
- Dust on her Petticoats by Kermit Hunter (1976)
- Hernando DeSoto, Conquistador by Kermit Hunter (1976)
- Blue Jacket by W.L. "Rusty" Mundell (1982)
- Trumpet in the Land by Paul Green (1984)
- The White Savage by Joseph Bonamico and Mark Durbin (1997)

Film and television

- Wanted, CBS TV series (1955–56), theme composer
- The Nurses, television series (1961–63)
- The Defenders, television series (1962–65)
- A Year Toward Tomorrow, documentary film (1967)
- Animal Doctor documentary film for USIA (1968)
- J.T., CBS Children's Television Workshop movie (1969)
- The Plot Against Harry, feature film directed by Michael Roemer (1989)

== Writings ==
- The Soundtrack in Nontheatrical Motion Pictures Society of Motion Picture Engineers, 1958.
- Man and His Sound—Expo 67. Society of Motion Picture and Television Engineers, 1968.
- Burning Bright, The Genesis of an Opera, Lyrica Society, 1985.
- The Music of Language in a Passage from Tannhäuser, Ars Lyrica, Journal of the Lyrica Society for Word-Music Relations, Volume XIII, 2003.
- Reflecting on Wagner

== Awards ==
- Fellowships from the National Endowment for the Arts and New Jersey State Council on the Arts
- Distinguished Artist Award from New Jersey State Council on the Arts
