= Concerto in C major, RV 558 =

1740 composition by Antonio Vivaldi

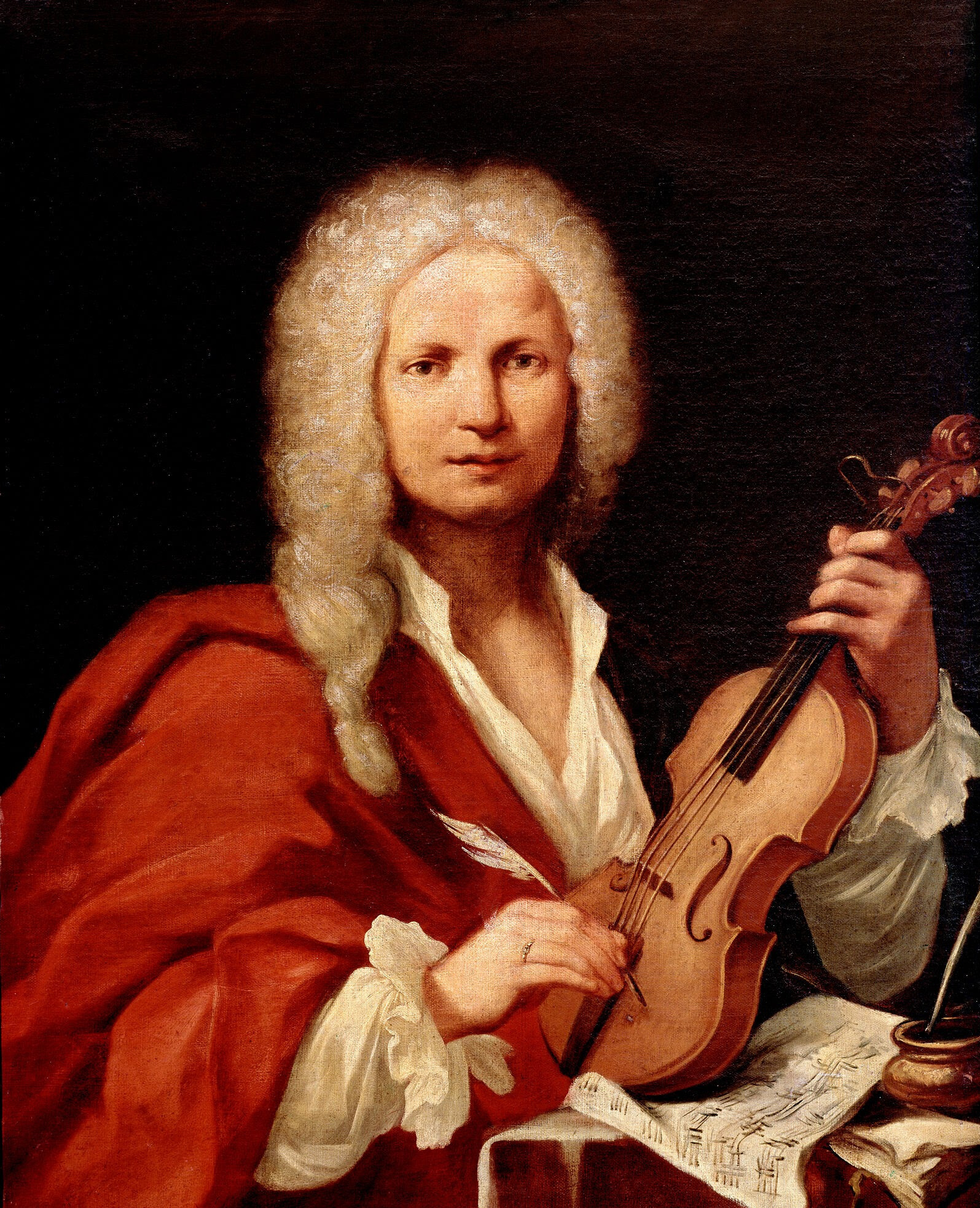
Vivaldi in 1723

The Concerto in C major, RV 558, otherwise known as "Concerto for Diverse Instruments" is a concerto grosso by Antonio Vivaldi, written around 1740, with its premiere on 21 March of that year.

== Structure ==
The work is in three movements:

1. Allegro molto
2. Andante molto
3. Allegro

=== Instrumentation ===
The eleven concertino instruments are two recorders, two chalumeaux, two mandolins, two theorbos, two violins a tromba marina, and a cello. (The phrase "a tromba marina" instructs the violinists to imitate the sound of a marine trumpet by placing a foil under the board.)

The orchestral ripieno consists of strings and basso continuo.

== See also ==
- List of compositions by Antonio Vivaldi
