= Harmonica Fats =

American blues harmonica player

Background information
- Born: Harvey Blackston; September 8, 1927; McDade, Bossier Parish, Louisiana, United States
- Died: January 3, 2000 (aged 72) Los Angeles, California, United States
- Genres: Blues, R&B
- Occupation: Musician
- Instrument(s): Harmonica, vocals
- Years active: 1954–2000
- Labels: Skylark, Dot, Bee Bump

Harmonica Fats (born Harvey Blackston, September 8, 1927 – January 3, 2000) was an American blues harmonica player who was active in the 1950s through to the 1990s. Fats first achieved success with his cover version of the Hank Ballard song "Tore Up" in 1962, which established him as an in-demand session and touring musician. He is also remembered for his collaboration with blues guitarist Bernie Pearl, a partnership that resulted in four albums.

== Biography ==
Born in McDade, Louisiana, a small community 40 miles from Shreveport, Blackston, the eldest of 13 children, was raised on a cotton farm by his grandparents. Blackston casually played harmonica since he was four years-old, and credited Sonny Terry as the foremost influence on his style of playing. Bored with the farming lifestyle, in 1946 Blackston relocated to Los Angeles where he lived with his father, and worked for a manufacturing company. After an automobile accident in 1954 temporarily left him jobless, Blackston began avidly practicing his harp skills; recalling how he knew "a guy by the name of Cleveland Weller that plays guitar and he invited me out to his house to play on a Saturday night with him. So I went out there. He gave me a mike and an amplifier and I started blowing through that mike and amplifier and I would hear all my mistakes, and so then I went down town next day bought me a amplifier and a mike and so I went and practised for four months".

Intent on avoiding the lack of preparation from his first public performance, Blackston formed a band known as the Houserockers, and rehearsed for two years, mastering a repertoire of over 200 songs. Blackston and his band started out at the Tango Club, quickly becoming a popular live fixture on the Los Angeles blues circuit as a result of their energetic stage act and Blackston's knack for penning humorous, but relatable, songs. Jamming with some of the city's most accomplished harmonica players, including George "Harmonica" Smith, Johnnie Dyer, and Harmonica Slim, Blackston's association with his contemporaries, particularly Slim, led to the adaption of his stage name, Harmonica Fats.

In 1962, while Fats was collaborating with pianist Henry Strogin, he demoed the Hank Ballard tune "Tore Up", a frequently requested song of which Fats had modified the lyrics. Fats re-recorded the song with session musicians, and released the single, backed by his original composition "I Get So Tired", on Skylark Records. It became an immense regional success, bubbled under the Billboard Hot 100 at 103, and established Fats as an in-demand touring musician. Skylark also distributed Fats' follow-up effort, "Mama, Mama Talk to Your Daughter for Me"; however, despite its popularity, it was the last recording by Fats issued for five years.

Fats recorded more singles in the late-1960s, including "My Baby Didn't Come Home", "The Birds and the Bees", and "Long Cool Summertime", none of which, however, managed to replicate the success Fats had with "Tore Up" or "Mama, Mama Talk to Your Daughter for Me". Regardless of his commercial flops, Fats thrived as a guest musician for acts such as Sam Cooke, Lou Rawls, Bobby Darin, Tina Turner, and Etta James, among others. By the mid-1970s, Fats significantly lessened the extent of his touring to California after accepting a position with Clorox.

Through Blind Joe Hill, Fats met Bernie Pearl, an electric blues guitarist who led a house band at the Ash Grove, in the early-1980s, and, although the two did not initially strike a partnership, by 1986 Fats became a permanent member of Pearl's group. In 1989, Fats and Pearl released the live album Live at Cafe Lido, which captured Fats' on-stage enthusiasm and magnetism. The demand for the album prompted the two to establish Bee Bump Records and release their first studio album, titled I Had to Get Nasty, in May 1991. Per Pearl's suggestion, the duo recorded acoustically on their final two albums, Two Heads Are Better and Blow, Fat Daddy, Blow!.

Fats died on January 3, 2000; he was 72 years-old.
