= James Moody (composer) =

Irish pianist and composer (1907–1995)

James Moody (1907–1995) (not to be confused with American saxophonist James Moody) was a Belfast-born pianist, arranger and composer best known for his music for classical harmonica, including twenty-two works for harmonica and piano, three works for harmonica and strings, eight works for harmonica and orchestra, and some two dozen other works for instrumental combinations such as harmonica and harp, harmonica and string quartet, and harmonica ensemble. He also arranged a lot of other music for harmonica, for example Irish, Scottish, English, and Norwegian folk melodies.

Moody gained his first recognition as a pianist, and from the age of thirteen was earning a good living playing in cinemas for silent films in his native town Belfast. He also wrote arrangements for and played piano in the Belfast-based Philip Whiteway Ensemble.

In 1938 Moody moved to England, joining BBC Bristol as a piano soloist, accompanist, and arranger. Over the next forty years he became a household name on British radio due to such long-running musical programs as Stop Dancing (1935–41) Accent on Rhythm (1937–56), Workers' Playtime (between 1954 and 1958 with guitarist Bert Weedon and drummer Max Abrams), and As You Were (1961–75). As accompanist and music director for many such variety shows, he came into contact with the famous harmonica soloist Tommy Reilly. This inspired him to teach himself to play the harmonica so that he could arrange and compose idiomatically for the instrument.

Reilly and Moody recorded many scores for the harmonica under the pen names Dwight Barker and Max Martin, many of them recorded on 78 RPM records issued by Berry Music Moody and Reilly worked together on the title music and score for the British comedy film The Navy Lark (based on the BBC radio series) in 1959. Other works (mostly dating from the 1930s and 1940s) included the orchestral miniatures Bulgarian Wedding Dance and Palm Beach Promenade, and piano compositions such as Boogie Caprice, Midsummer Madness and Parakeet in Paradise.

Moody's four movement Little Suite for harmonica and small orchestra (1960) was recorded by Reilly with the Academy of St Martin in the Fields conducted by Neville Marriner in 1977. More recently his Quintet for harmonica and string quartet, composed in 1972, has been recorded by the Italian harmonica player Gianluca Littera and the Quartetto Energie Nove.
