= Society for the Preservation and Advancement of the Harmonica =

The Society for the Preservation and Advancement of the Harmonica (SPAH) is a 501(c)(3) non-profit corporation dedicated to players of the harmonica. Organized as a club, SPAH has members worldwide, though the majority of the members are located in the United States. Members include both harmonica players, ranging from beginners of all ages to professional musicians, and enthusiasts who love the harmonica but do not play it.

In pursuit of its mission to preserve and advance the harmonica, SPAH engages in several activities:

- Publishes a quarterly magazine, Harmonica Happenings, which is distributed to SPAH members.
- Publicizes activities in the world of harmonica through its magazine, email newsletter, website, and Facebook page.
- Organizes an annual convention for harmonica players, composers, authors, educators, enthusiasts, manufacturers, vendors, and crafters.
- Makes annual awards for excellence, which are presented at the annual convention.
- Makes grants to deserving youth to attend the SPAH convention.
- Raises funds for the youth grant through donations to the William Rosebush Youth Fund.
- Encourages the formation of local harmonica clubs both in the United States and around the world, and advises interested local organizers on request.

== Objectives ==
The objectives of the organization are to "cultivate, develop, improve, foster, promote, preserve and advance the harmonica and harmonica playing."

== History ==
SPAH was founded in October 1962 by Earl Collins Jr. (1924-1988), who began by taking out advertisements in newspapers in the Detroit area, looking for harmonica players with whom to meet. The idea for SPAH came from the early results of these ads.

SPAH was incorporated on October 23, 1963. It is based in Troy, Michigan, United States. Early SPAH events were evening concerts. Over time, SPAH events grew to two days, and eventually to the present five-day convention. The SPAH magazine, Harmonica Happenings, was first published in 1967.

For several years, the SPAH convention was held in the Detroit area, organized by SPAH members and officials who resided in the area. Starting in 1996, SPAH began working with other local clubs to stage the SPAH convention in additional locations, beginning with Saint Louis, Missouri. Since then, the SPAH convention has been held in Denver, Colorado (twice); Saint Louis (multiple times); Columbus, Ohio; Kansas City, Missouri; Minneapolis, Minnesota; Milwaukee, Wisconsin; Sacramento, California; Virginia Beach, Virginia; and Irving, Texas (twice).

== Activities ==
To execute its mission to preserve and advance the harmonica, SPAH engages in several activities

=== Publicity ===
Through print and the internet, SPAH helps promote harmonica activities.

- Harmonica Happenings: Published by SPAH since 1967, Harmonica Happenings is a quarterly magazine that features harmonica news, CD and book reviews, historical articles, and other information on topics of interest to harmonica players, in addition to official SPAH announcements. Harmonica Happenings is distributed to SPAH members as a benefit of membership.
- SPAH email newsletter: The SPAH email newsletter is distributed periodically to a voluntary email list. SPAH membership is not required to receive the email newsletter; anyone who wishes to receive it may sign up at http://spah.us4.list-manage.com/subscribe?u=6ebb059ecb9e9315d7d46c074&id=7f0071b975.
- SPAH website: The SPAH website is http://spah.org. It is the most comprehensive and up-to-date source for information on SPAH activities, including upcoming conventions.
- SPAH Facebook page: SPAH's Facebook page, https://www.facebook.com/pages/SPAH/111868439649, displays information on harmonica activities posted both by SPAH and by Facebook members.

=== Annual SPAH Convention ===
Every year in the month of August, SPAH organizes and presents a five-day convention in a city in the United States, in coordination with a local harmonica club. The SPAH convention is usually held in a hotel near an airport and major highways, and features daytime seminars and jam sessions, open mic stages, afternoon and evening concerts, a teaching event for local children, a free-form teach-in, a vendor room populated by harmonica manufacturers and vendors, crafters, builders, and customizers; builders of harmonica accessories and electronics. Tours are organized for those who wish to take in the local sights, and sometimes offsite events are staged in coordination with the convention.

=== Promoting youth activities ===
SPAH encourages young people to play the harmonica through two specific programs:

- Youth grants: SPAH makes grants, distributed from its William Rosebush Youth Fund, to youth (persons under 21 years of age) to attend the SPAH convention. Grant recipients receive amounts to defray their expenses in attending the SPAH convention, in return for which they perform service activities, participate in musical performances, and assist in fundraising.
- Kids' program at the SPAH convention: Each year SPAH and the hosting club work with the local community to bring several dozen schoolchildren to a half-day event at the SPAH convention to learn the basics of playing the harmonica, receive a bag lunch, and march through the convention playing a song they have learned together.

=== Education ===
To promote harmonica pedagogy, SPAH distributes information on teaching harmonica, and responds to questions about harmonica playing or teaching. SPAH encourages incorporation of harmonica programs into school curriculums as a low-cost means of introducing students to playing a Musical instrument.

=== Harmonicas and Health ===
Several medical professionals have taken up clinical research in the use of the harmonica in respiratory therapy. SPAH's Harmonicas and Health Committee seeks to promote these efforts through communication and coordination among those professionals, publicization of their efforts, and presentations at the SPAH convention.

=== Awards ===
SPAH honors individuals and organizations whose exceptional activities and achievements have benefited the harmonica community and advanced SPAH's mission to preserve and advance the harmonica. SPAH makes three annual awards, which are presented at the SPAH convention:

Bernie Bray Harmonica Player of the Year Award

- Awarded to an individual whose proficiency excellence in playing the harmonica is a source of pride to the harmonica community.
- Award should be for distinction demonstrated or attained recently, preferably during a twelve-month period prior to the deadline for nominations.
- Only one person may receive the Bernie Bray Award in any year.

Pete Pedersen Lifetime Achievement Award

- Awarded to an outstanding harmonica player with a record of achievements over a long period of time that may reasonably be considered to be the virtual equivalent of a lifetime.
- Recipient has been active in promoting the preservation and advancement of the harmonica and the positive and meaningful interaction of harmonica players and devotees.
- Recipient has demonstrated generosity in sharing their talents and knowledge, and in remaining accessible to members of the harmonica community.
- Only one person may receive the Pete Pedersen Lifetime Achievement Award in any one year unless there is a compelling reason to do otherwise.

SPAH Award of Special Merit

- Awarded to individuals or organizations that have benefited the harmonica community in a manner that is deserving of singular honor.
- Recipients may be organizations and may be individuals who do not play the harmonica.

=== Fundraising ===
While annual dues and convention revenues provide the bulk of SPAH's funding, SPAH also raises funds through sponsorships of the organization and donations to its Wiliam Rosebush Youth Fund.

- Sponsorships: Major donors to SPAH may be designated sponsors at the gold, silver and bronze levels, depending on the size of the annual gift. Sponsors include harmonica manufacturers and private individuals.
- William Rosebush Youth Fund: The William Rosebush Youth fund was established in 2011 by a gift deriving from the estate of SPAH member and supporter William Rosebush, which was directed by the donor to support youth. SPAH solicits donations directed by donors to the Rosebush fund in order to furnish ongoing support for youth. SPAH uses the Rosebush fund to make grants to applicants under the age of 21 to defray their expenses in attending the SPAH convention.
