= Tommy Reilly (harmonica player) =

Canadian harmonica player (1919–2000)

Tommy Reilly MBE
- Born: Thomas Rundle Reilly; August 21, 1919; Guelph, Ontario, Canada
- Died: September 25, 2000 (aged 81) Frensham, Surrey, England
- Genres: Jazz, classical, popular
- Occupations: Musician, composer, teacher
- Instrument: Harmonica
- Years active: 1940s–1990s

Thomas Rundle Reilly (August 21, 1919 – September 25, 2000) was a Canadian-born harmonica player, predominantly based in England. He began studying violin at eight and began playing harmonica at aged eleven as a member of his father's band. In the 1940s, he began parallel careers as a concert soloist and recitalist, a popular radio and TV performer, and a studio musician-composer.

== Early life ==
Born in Guelph, Ontario, he studied violin at eight and began playing harmonica at aged eleven as a member of his father's band.

In 1935 the family moved to London. At the outbreak of the Second World War he was a student at the Leipzig Conservatory. He was arrested and interned for the duration of the war in prisoner of war camps. However it was there that he developed his virtuosity on the harmonica, basing his ideas of phrasing and interpretation on the playing of Jascha Heifetz.

== Career ==
Returning to London in 1945, Reilly began championing the cause of the harmonica as a serious solo concert instrument. He began parallel careers as a concert soloist and recitalist, a popular BBC radio and TV performer, and a studio musician-composer. He performed with most of the major European orchestras and toured Europe several times with the Academy of St Martin-in-the-Fields. He also played the theme tune and musical breaks to the BBC Radio series The Navy Lark, from 1959-77, and the soundtrack to the British television show, Dial 999 (TV series), in 1958.

More than 30 concert works were composed for Reilly, including Michael Spivakovsky's Harmonica Concerto of 1951 and fellow Canadian Robert Farnon's Prelude and Dance for Harmonica and Orchestra. Other pieces were composed by Reilly's accompanist James Moody, (Little Suite for Harmonica and Small Orchestra, 1960) Matyas Seiber (Old Scottish Air for Harmonica, Strings and Harp), Gordon Jacob (Five Pieces for Harmonica and Strings), Fried Walter (Ballade and Tarantella for Harmonica and Orchestra), Karl Heinz-Köper (Concerto for Harmonica and Orchestra), Graham Whettam (Fantasy for Harmonica and Orchestra), Vilém Tauský (Concertino for Harmonica and Orchestra), Francis Ward (Kaleidoscope for Harmonica and Orchestra), Willem Strietman ("O bonne douce France" for Harmonica and Orchestra), Max Saunders (Sonatina for Harmonica and Piano), Sir George Martin (Three American Sketches for Harmonica and Strings, and Adagietto for Harmonica and Strings), Alan Langford (Concertante for Harmonica and Strings), Paul Patterson (Propositions for Harmonica and Strings).

Reilly worked with many composers to get more original music written for the instrument, and his recordings also include original harmonica works by Ralph Vaughan Williams, Malcolm Arnold, Arthur Benjamin, and Villa-Lobos.

He was signed to Parlophone in 1951 where his recordings were produced by George Martin. He performed music for the soundtracks of many US and European films and television series, including British comedy The Navy Lark (1959) and the TV theme tune for Dixon of Dock Green. In 1967, Reilly initiated the development of the first Hohner silver harmonica. He and James Moody have recorded many musical scores for the harmonica under the pen names "Dwight Barker" and "Max Martin". His song Double March was also the theme song for Bobino on Ici Radio-Canada Télé.

== Honours ==
In 1992 he was awarded the MBE for his services to music.

== Death ==
Tommy Reilly died aged 81 in Frensham, Surrey. His granddaughter Georgina Reilly is an English-born Canadian film and television actor. Larry Adler admitted in The Guardian obituary of Tommy that "He never even had a close second".

== Bibliography ==
- Reilly, Tommy (1952). Play Like the Stars. London: M Hohner Ltd. ASIN B0011DD1U6.
- Reilly, Tommy (1959). Studies for the Chromatic Harmonica. London: John E. Dallas & Sons. ASIN B0000D23RF.
- Reilly, Tommy; Moody, James (1969). The Tommy Reilly Harmonica Course. London: M Hohner Ltd. ASIN B0036MNBJ6.
