= Concerto for Harmonica and Orchestra (Arnold) =

Concerto by Malcolm Arnold

The Concerto for Harmonica and Orchestra, Opus 46, is a concerto featuring a harmonica soloist, written by English composer Malcolm Arnold. The piece was composed in 1954 for the American harmonica virtuoso Larry Adler, and was premiered on August 14, 1954, at the Royal Albert Hall, with accompaniment by the BBC Symphony Orchestra. The concerto has a duration of nine minutes and is cast in three movements:

1. Grazioso
2. Mesto
3. Con brio

== Sources ==
- The World Guide to Musical Instruments, Max Wade-Matthews, Anness Publishing Ltd., 2001
- Official Malcolm Arnold Website
