= Asia Pacific Harmonica Festival =

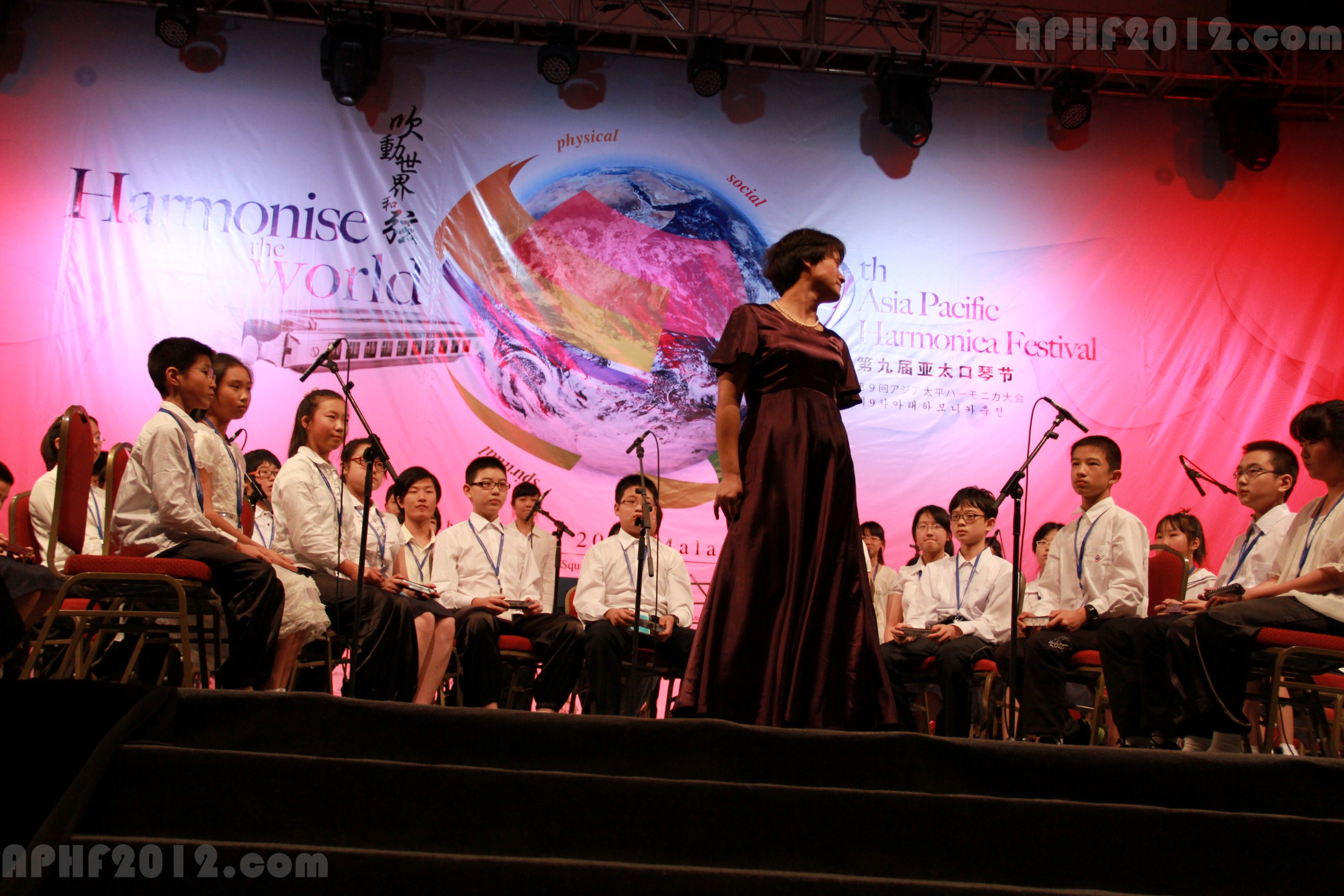
9th Asia Pacific Harmonica Festival

Asia Pacific Harmonica Festival (APHF, Chinese:亞太口琴節, Japanese:アジア太平洋ハーモニカ大会) is one of the world's largest harmonica events. It is held every two years. The first APHF was held in Taipei in 1996. Musician and composer Jiayi He has served as a judge at APHF.

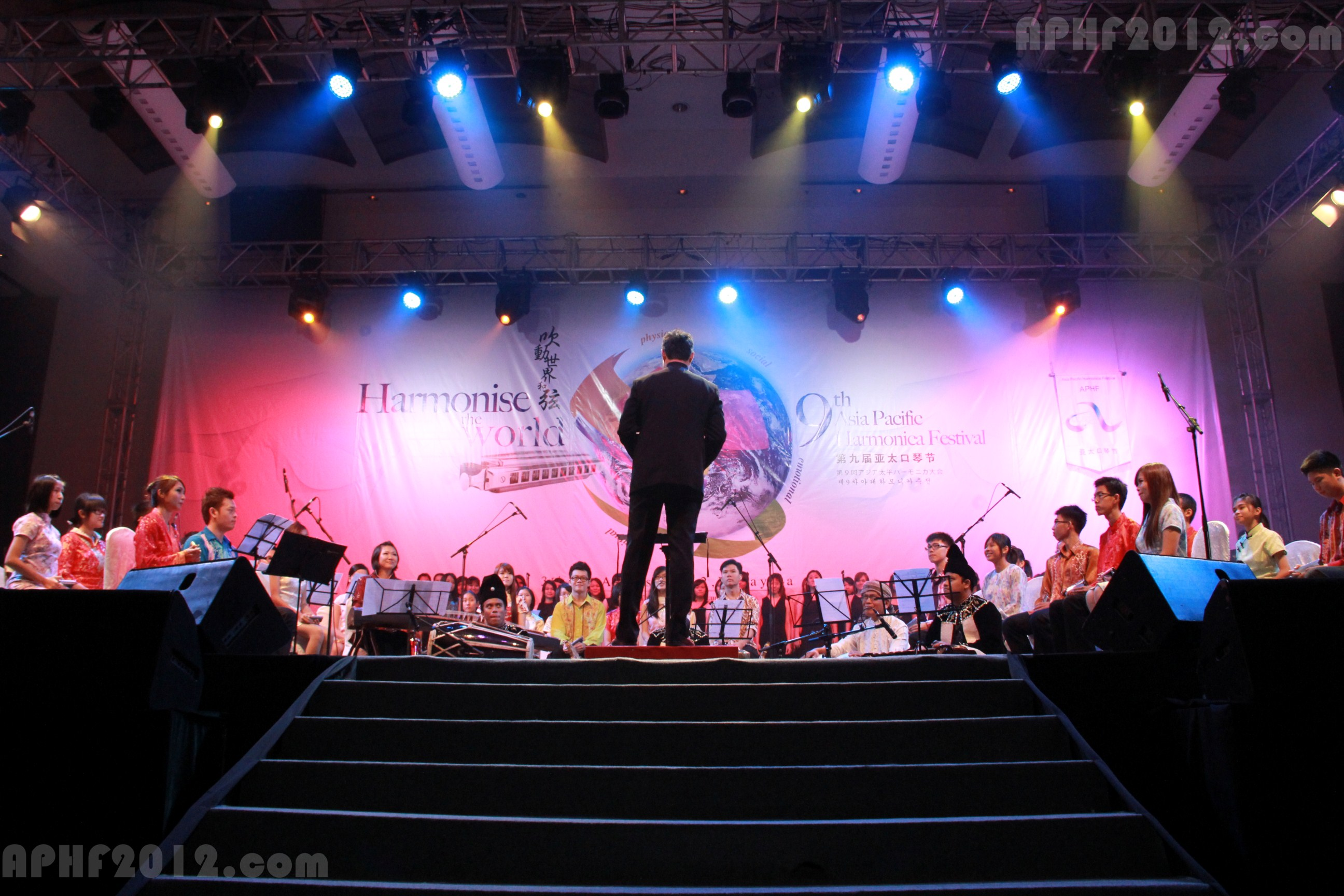
9th Asia Pacific Harmonica Festival

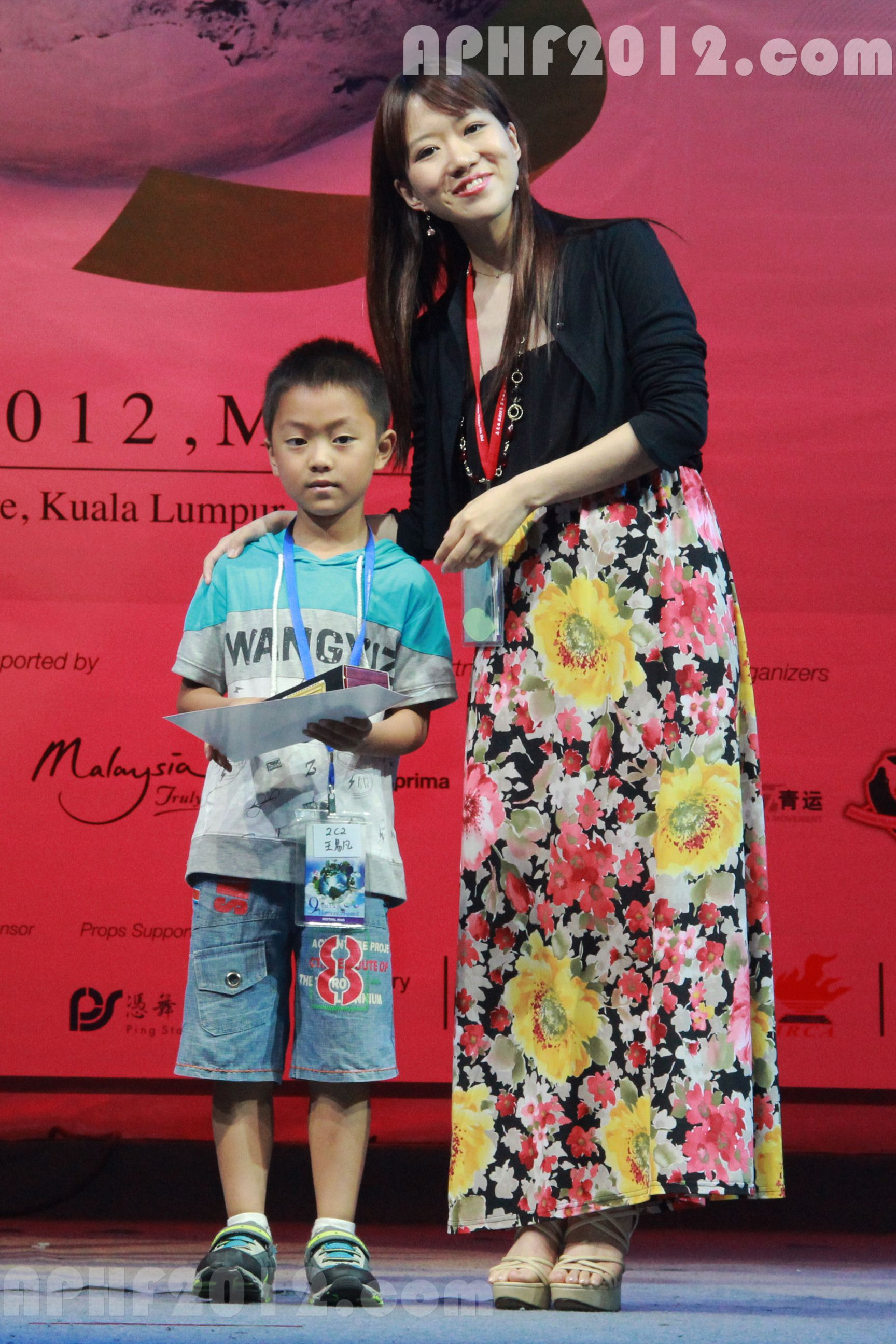
9th Asia Pacific Harmonica Festival

== List of APHF Events ==
Year	Host city	Country/Region	Organizer
1996	Taipei	Taiwan	Taiwan Harmonica Art Promotion Association
1998	Kuala Lumpur	Malaysia	My Harmonica World SDN BHD
2000	Seoul	South Korea	Korea Harmonica Association
2002	Atsugi	Japan	All Japan Harmonica Federation
2004	Hong Kong	China	Hong Kong Harmonica Association / King's Harmonica Quintet
2006	Taipei	Taiwan	Taiwan Harmonica Art Promotion Association
2008	Hangzhou	China
2010	Singapore	Singapore	Singapore Harmonica Aficionados Society
2012	Kuala Lumpur	Malaysia	Official site	My Harmonica World SDN BHD
2014	Hangzhou	China	Official site
2016	Hsinchu	Taiwan	Taiwan Harmonica Art Promotion Association
