= List of Canned Heat band members =

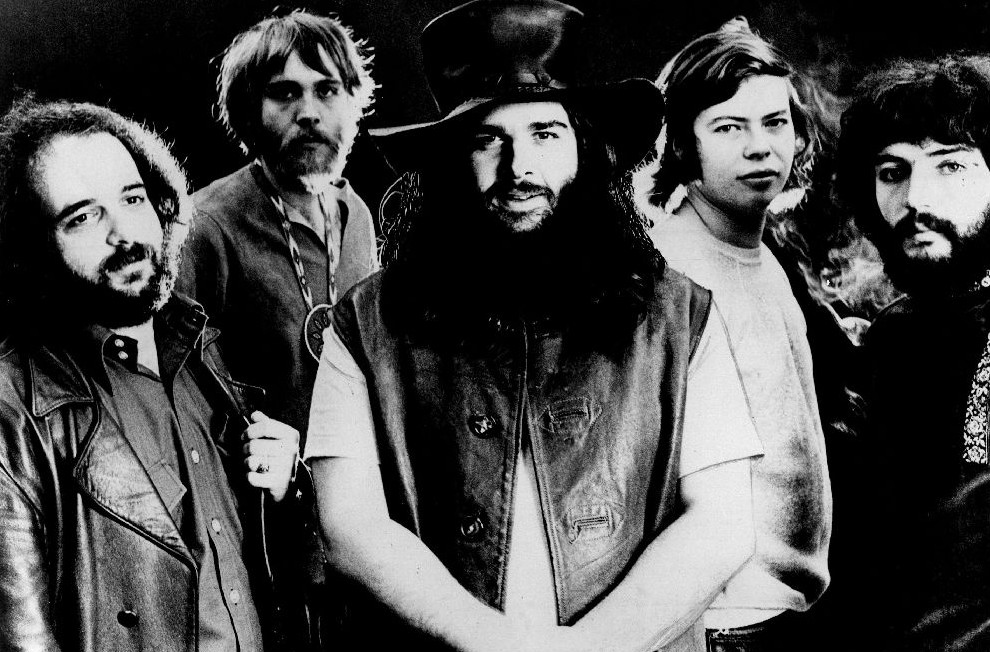
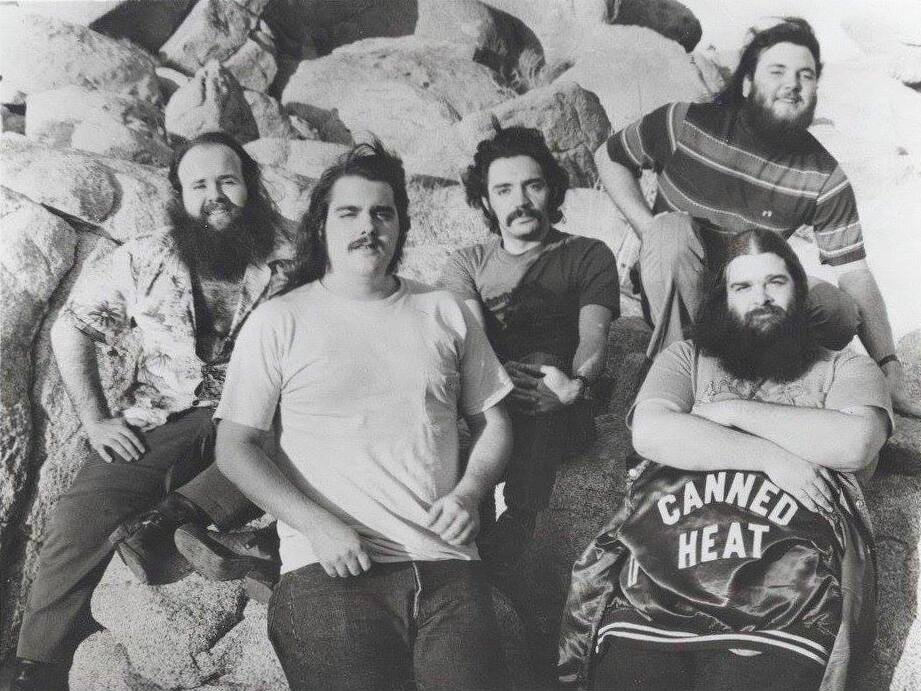
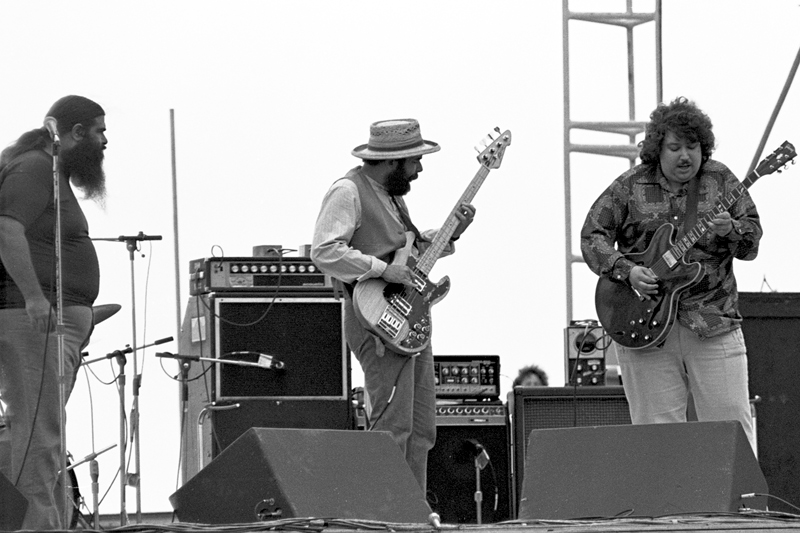
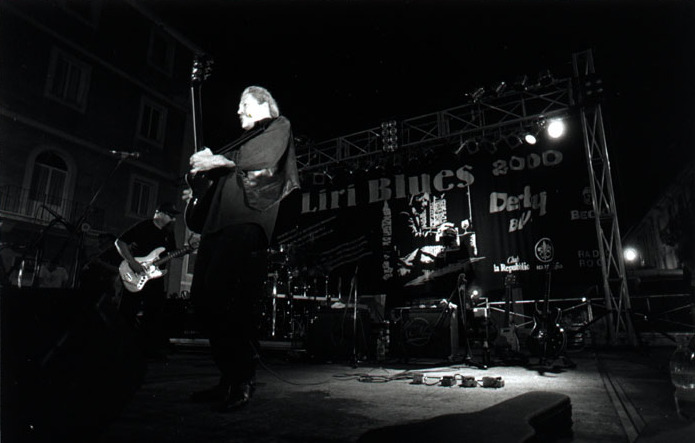
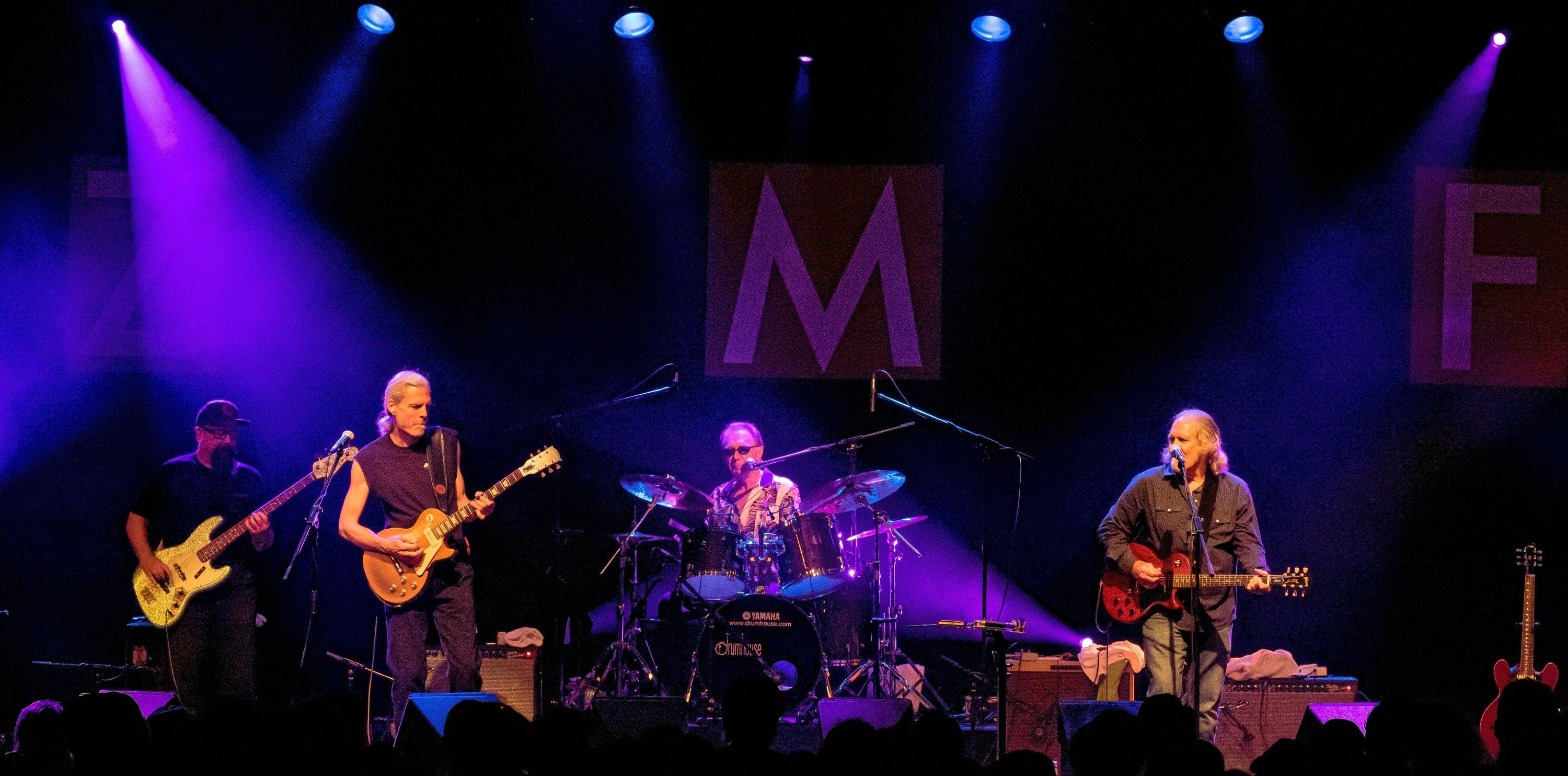
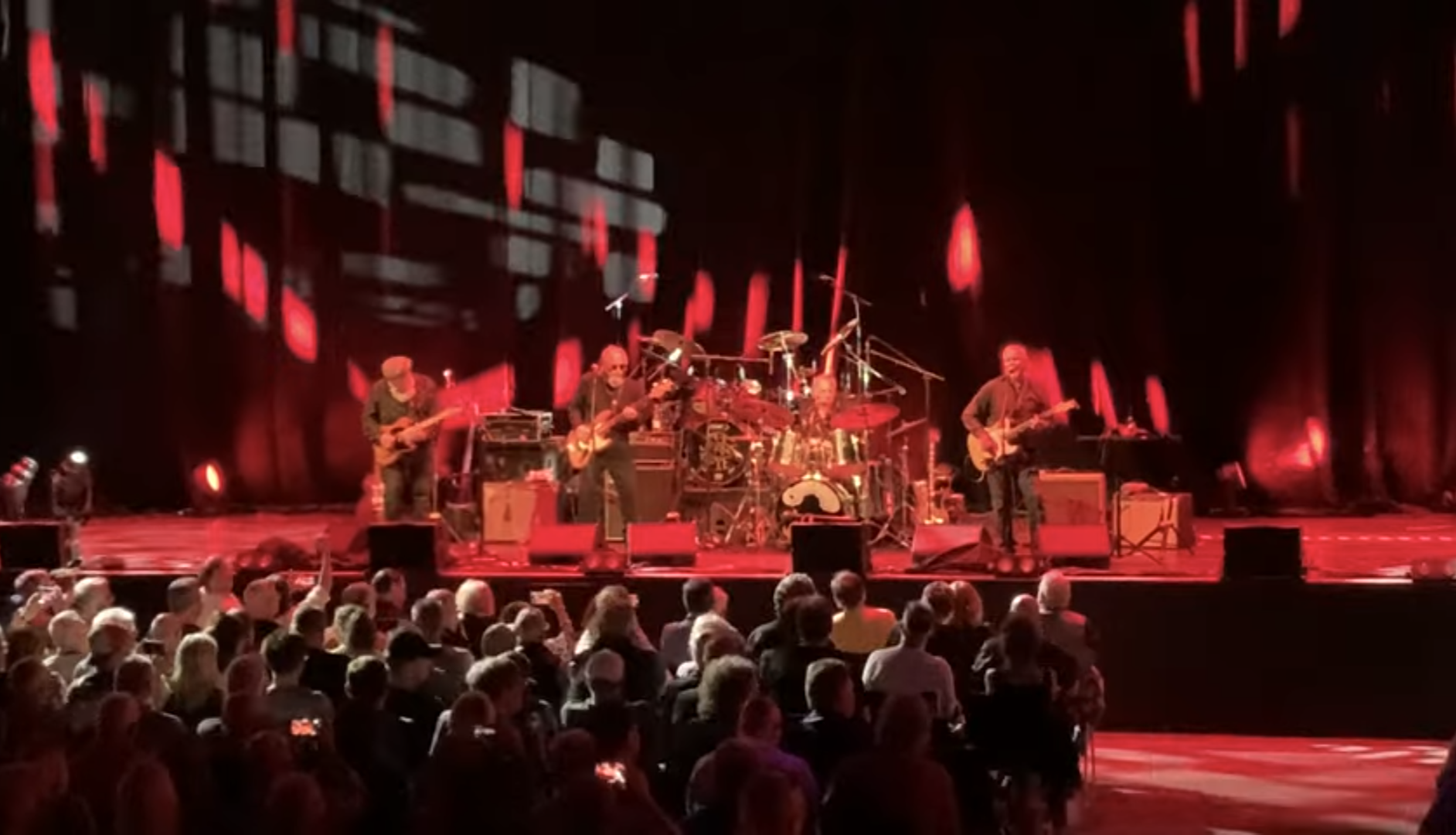
Four lineups of Canned Heat in 1970, 1976, 1979, 2000, 2014 and 2024.

Canned Heat is an American blues rock band founded by Alan "Blind Owl" Wilson and Bob "The Bear" Hite in 1965. The band's classic line-up consisted of Wilson on slide guitar, vocals and harmonica, Hite on vocals and harmonica, Henry "The Sunflower" Vestine on lead guitar, Larry "The Mole" Taylor on bass and Adolfo "Fito" de la Parra on drums. The band's current line-up includes De la Parra, singer, guitarist and harmonicist Dale Wesley Spalding (since 2008), bassist Rick Reed (since 2019), and guitarist/keyboardist Jimmy Vivino (since 2021).

== History ==
Both Wilson and Hite were avid blues historians and record collectors, they chose the name Canned Heat from “Canned Heat Blues", a 1928 song by Tommy Johnson. The band's first rehearsal included Mike Perlowin on lead guitar, Stu Brotman on bass and Keith Sawyer on drums, Perlowin and Sawyer soon left and were replaced by Kenny Edwards and Ron Holmes respectively. Henry "The Sunflower" Vestine attended the band's first gig, and soon after asked to join the band as the third guitarist, soon replacing Edwards after the band decided to go back to two guitars. Frank Cook replaced Holmes as the band's drummer at around the same time.

After a run of infrequent gigs, the band disbanded in August 1966, before reforming for a one off gig that November. This gig got the interest of agents for the William Morris Agency, who got the band a record contract. Stuart Brotman departed in early 1967, he was replaced by Mark Andes and then by Larry "The Mole" Taylor in March that year. After releasing their self titled debut album in July, the band replaced Cook with Adolfo "Fito" de la Parra. De la Parra became an official member on December 1, 1967. Vestine departed in late July 1969 after tensions with Taylor. He was temporarily replaced by Mike Bloomfield, and then by Harvey "The Snake" Mandel. Taylor and Mandel both departed in 1970 to join the Bluesbreakers, they were replaced by Antonio de la Barreda and the returning Vestine respectively.

On September 3, 1970, Alan Wilson died at age 27 from a barbiturate overdose. The band had to continue due to contractual reasons, Wilson was replaced by Joel Scott Hill. In 1973 the line-up expanded, included Hite, Vestine and De la Parra alongside James Shane on rhythm guitar and vocals, Ed Beyer on keyboards, and Hite's brother Richard on bass. After a change in management in 1974, Vestine, Shane and Beyer quit the band. Replacing the departed were pianist Gene Taylor and guitarist Chris Morgan. In 1976 Gene Taylor departed, and was replaced by guitarist Stan Webb (of Chicken Shack) on a temporary basis before Mark Skyer joined.

Skyer, Morgan and Richard Hite all quit the band in 1977, Richard Exley quickly joined as bass player and the band continued as a three piece, until Exley left in 1978. The band was revived with Larry Taylor returning on bass and new members Mike "Hollywood Fats" Mann (guitar) and Ronnie Barron (piano). Barron was soon replaced by Jay Spell after an argument with Taylor. Mike Halby replaced Mann during recording, Taylor also left and was replaced by Jon Lamb, who joined alongside Henry Vestine who returned to the band. After a difficult tour in 1980, Jay Spell also left the band and was not replaced, after the next tour Jon Lamb also left, He was replaced by Ernie Rodriguez.

On April 5, 1981, Bob Hite died of a heroin overdose. The band again had to continue due to contractual reasons, Hite was replaced by singer and harmonica player Rick Kellogg. Vestine again departed after a fight with Rodriguez, he was replaced by Walter Trout. The incarnation continued until 1984 when Mike Halby departed after a dispute with De la Parra. In 1985, Trout departed to join John Mayall's Bluesbreakers, Vestine returned to take his place, joining alongside James Thornbury (slide guitar, harmonica and lead vocals) and Skip Jones (bass).

In 1987, Larry Taylor and Ronnie Barron both returned. Vestine and Barron were soon ousted by Taylor, they were both replaced by Junior Watson in 1988. A new line-up appeared in 1990, with Mandel back in the fold and Ron Shumake joining on bass alongside Taylor. After a few tours, Mandel left the band with Becky Barksdale stepping in for a few tours in 1992. Smokey Hormel also played one gig before departing alongside Taylor after friction with De la Parra.

Vestine and Watson made their returns to the lineup. In 1995, frontman James Thornbury left the band after ten years on amicable terms, Robert Lucas replaced him in the line-up. Mandel returned in 1996 with Shumake departing soon after, Mark "Pocket" Goldberg temporarily took the vacant bass spot, before Greg Kage joined permanently. Larry Taylor also returned on second bass.

On October 20, 1997, Vestine died of cancer following the final gig of a European tour. Taylor and Watson subsequently left the band. By 2000, Robert Lucas had departed and the lineup was completed by Dallas Hodge (vocals, guitar), John Paulus (guitar) and Stanley "Baron" Behrens (harmonica, saxophone, flute). Paulus was replaced by Don Preston for dates in 2005. Lucas returned to Canned Heat in late 2005, alongside Barry Levenson. Lucas left again in late 2008. He died, age 46, on November 23, 2008, at a friend's home in Long Beach, California; the cause was an apparent drug overdose. Also, former bassist Antonio de la Barreda died of a heart attack on February 17, 2009.

From late 2008 to early in 2010, the lineup included Dale Spalding (guitar, harmonica and vocals), Barry Levenson (lead guitar), Greg Kage (bass), and de la Parra on drums. Mandel and Larry Taylor toured with Canned Heat during the summer of 2009 on the Heroes of Woodstock Tour to celebrate the 40th anniversary of Woodstock. In 2010, Taylor and Mandel officially replaced Kage and Levenson, and as of 2012, this lineup (de la Parra, Taylor, Mandel, and Spalding) continued to tour regularly.

In October 2012, during a festival tour in Spain, France and Switzerland, Randy Resnick was called to replace Mandel who had to quit the tour due to health issues. Resnick played two dates, October 4 and 5, but had to return home for prior commitments. De la Parra was able to get Paulus to fly in from Portland to finish the tour. On September 7, 2013, Paulus once again substituted for Mandel at the Southern Maryland Blues Festival. In 2014, he officially replaced Mandel. On August 19, 2019, longtime bass guitarist Taylor died after a twelve-year battle with cancer. Former drummer Frank Cook died on July 9, 2021, aged 79. The band now includes Rick Reed on bass (since 2019), and Jimmy Vivino on guitar, keyboards and vocals (since 2021). Paulus still plays with the band when his health allows.

In 2025, Mark Teixeira joined as touring replacement for de la Parra.

== Members ==
=== Current ===
Image	Name	Years active	Instruments	Release contributions
	Adolfo "Fito" de la Parra	1967–present	drums; vocals	all releases except Canned Heat (1967) and Vintage (1970)
	Dale Wesley Spalding	2008–present	vocals; rhythm guitar; harmonica; bass	Finyl Vinyl (2024)
	Rick Reed	2019–present	bass	Finyl Vinyl (2024)
	Jimmy Vivino	2021–present	lead guitar; keyboards; vocals	Finyl Vinyl (2024)
	Mark Teixeira	2025–present (substitute)	drums	none to date

=== Former ===
Image	Name	Years active	Instruments	Release contributions
	Bob "The Bear" Hite	1965–1981 (until his death)	vocals; harmonica; occasional guitar and bass	all releases until Kings of the Boogie (Dog House Blues) (1981); King Biscuit Flower Hour (1995); Live at Turku Festival (1995); Live at Montreux 1973 (2011); Christmas Album (2007)
	Alan "Blind Owl" Wilson	1965–1970 (until his death)	slide and rhythm guitar; harmonica; vocals; piano	all releases until Live at Topanga Corral (1971)
	Stuart Brotman	1965–1966	bass	Vintage (1970)
	Keith Sawyer	1965	drums	none
	Mike Perlowin	1965 (died 2021)	lead guitar	none
	Kenny Edwards	1965 (died 2010)	lead guitar	none
	Ron Holmes	1965 (temporary)	drums	none
	Henry "The Sunflower" Vestine	1965–1969; 1970–1974; 1980–1981; 1985–1988; 1992–1997 (until his death)	lead guitar; bass (1969)	all releases until Hallelujah (1969); Vintage (1970); and from Hooker 'n Heat (1971) to The New Age (1973); Kings of the Boogie (Dog House Blues) (1981); Boogie up the Country (1987); Internal Combustion (1994); Live at Turku Festival (1995); Canned Heat Blues Band (1996); Christmas Album (2007); Live at Montreux 1973 (2011)
	Frank Cook	1965–1967 (died 2021)	drums	Vintage (1970)
	Mark Andes	1966–1967	bass	none
	Larry "The Mole" Taylor	1967–1970; 1978–1980; 1987–1992; 1996–1997; 1999; 2010–2019 (until his death)	bass; rhythm and lead guitar; vocals	Canned Heat (1967); Boogie with Canned Heat (1968); Living the Blues (1968); Hallelujah (1969); Future Blues (1970); Canned Heat '70 Concert Live in Europe (1970); Live at Topanga Corral (1971); Reheated (1988); Burnin’ Live (1991); Internal Combustion (1994); King Biscuit Flower Hour (1995); Canned Heat Blues Band (1996); Boogie 2000 (1999); Friends in the Can (2003); Christmas Album (2007)
	Mike Bloomfield	1969 (temporary) (died 1981)	lead guitar	none
	Harvey "The Snake" Mandel	1969–1970; 1990–1992; 1996–1999; 2010–2014	lead guitar	Future Blues (1970); Canned Heat '70 Concert Live in Europe (1970); Historical Figures and Ancient Heads (1971) one track; Internal Combustion (1994); Friends in the Can (2003)
	Antonio de la Barreda	1970–1972 (died 2009)	bass	Hooker 'n Heat (1971); Historical Figures and Ancient Heads (1971); Live at Turku Festival (1995)
	Joel Scott Hill	1970–1972 (died 2016)	rhythm guitar; vocals	Historical Figures and Ancient Heads (1971); Live at Turku Festival (1995)
	Richard Hite	1972–1977 (died 2001)	bass; rhythm guitar; vocals	The New Age (1973); One More River to Cross (1973); Human Condition (1978); Live at Montreux 1973 (2011)
	James Shane	1972–1974	rhythm and lead guitar; bass; vocals	The New Age (1973); One More River to Cross (1973); Live at Montreux 1973 (2011)
	Ed Beyer	1972–1974	keyboards	The New Age (1973); One More River to Cross (1973); Live at Montreux 1973 (2011)
	Chris Morgan	1974–1977 (died 2024)	lead and rhythm guitar	Human Condition (1978); Hooker 'n Heat, Live at the Fox Venice Theatre (1981)
	Gene Taylor	1974–1976 (died 2021)	piano; rhythm guitar	none
	Stan Webb	1976	lead guitar; vocals	none
	Mark Skyer	1976–1977	lead guitar; vocals	Human Condition (1978); Hooker 'n Heat, Live at the Fox Venice Theatre (1981)
	Richard Exley	1977–1978	bass	none
	Mike "Hollywood Fats" Mann	1978–1980 (died 1986)	lead and rhythm guitar	King Biscuit Flower Hour (1995)
	Ronnie Barron	1978; 1987–1988 (died 1997)	piano	Hooker 'n Heat, Live at the Fox Venice Theatre (1981); Internal Combustion (1994)
	Jay Spell	1978–1980 (died 2010)	piano; vocals	Christmas Album (2007)
	Mike Halby	1978–1984 (died 2008)	rhythm guitar; vocals	Kings of the Boogie (Dog House Blues) (1981); Boogie Assault (1991)
	Jon Lamb	1980	bass	none
	Ernie Rodriguez	1980–1985	bass; vocals	Kings of the Boogie (Dog House Blues) (1981); Boogie Assault (1991)
	Richard Kellogg	1981–1985 (died 2008)	vocals; harmonica	Kings of the Boogie (Dog House Blues) (1981); Boogie Assault (1991)
	Walter Trout	1981–1985	lead guitar; vocals	Boogie Assault (1991); Friends in the Can (2003)
	James Thornbury	1985–1995 (died 2017)	vocals; rhythm guitar; harmonica	Boogie up the Country (1987); Reheated (1988); Burnin’ Live (1991); Internal Combustion (1994)
	Skip Jones	1985–1987	bass	none
	Junior Watson	1988–1990; 1992–1997	lead and rhythm guitar; vocals	Reheated (1988); Burnin’ Live (1991); Internal Combustion (1994)
	Ron Shumake	1990–1996 (died 2014)	bass	Internal Combustion (1994)
	Becky Barksdale	1992	lead guitar	none
	Smokey Hormel	1992	lead guitar	none
	Robert Lucas	1995–2000; 2005–2008 (died 2008)	vocals; slide and rhythm guitar; harmonica	Canned Heat Blues Band (1996); Boogie 2000 (1999); Christmas Album (2007)
	Mark "Pocket" Goldberg	1996	bass	none
	Greg Kage	1996–2010	bass; vocals	Canned Heat Blues Band (1996); Boogie 2000 (1999); Friends in the Can (2003); Christmas Album (2007)
	Paul Bryant	1997–2000	lead and rhythm guitar	none
	John Paulus	2000–2005; 2012 (substitute); 2013–20?? (sporadic appearances since 2021)	lead, slide and rhythm guitar; bass; backing vocals	Friends in the Can (2003)
	Stanley "The Baron" Behrens	2000–2005	saxophone; flute; harmonica; vocals	Friends in the Can (2003)
	Dallas Hodge	2000–2005	vocals; rhythm, lead and slide guitar	Friends in the Can (2003)
	Don Preston	2005	lead guitar	none
	Barry Levenson	2006–2010	lead guitar	Christmas Album (2007)
	Randy Resnick	2012 (substitute)	lead guitar	none

== Line-ups ==
Period	Members	Releases
1965	Bob "The Bear" Hite – vocals; Alan "Blind Owl" Wilson – slide and rhythm guitar, harmonica, vocals; Stuart Brotman – bass; Mike Perlowin – lead guitar; Keith Sawyer – drums	none
1965	Bob "The Bear" Hite – vocals; Alan "Blind Owl" Wilson – slide and rhythm guitar, harmonica, vocals; Stuart Brotman – bass; Kenny Edwards – lead guitar; Ron Holmes – drums (temporary)	none
1965	Bob "The Bear" Hite – vocals; Alan "Blind Owl" Wilson – slide and rhythm guitar, harmonica, vocals; Stuart Brotman – bass; Kenny Edwards – co-lead guitar; Henry "The Sunflower" Vestine – co-lead guitar; Ron Holmes – drums (temporary)	none
1965 – 1966	Bob "The Bear" Hite – vocals; Alan "Blind Owl" Wilson – slide and rhythm guitar, harmonica, vocals; Stuart Brotman – bass; Frank Cook – drums; Henry "The Sunflower" Vestine – lead guitar	Vintage (1970; recorded 1966)
1966 – early 1967	Bob "The Bear" Hite – vocals; Alan "Blind Owl" Wilson – slide and rhythm guitar, harmonica, vocals; Frank Cook – drums; Henry "The Sunflower" Vestine – lead guitar; Mark Andes – bass	none
early 1967	Bob "The Bear" Hite – vocals; Alan "Blind Owl" Wilson – slide and rhythm guitar, harmonica, vocals; Frank Cook – drums; Henry "The Sunflower" Vestine – lead guitar; Larry "The Mole" Taylor – bass	Canned Heat (1967)
March 1967 – July 1969 Classic line-up #1	Bob "The Bear" Hite – vocals; Alan "Blind Owl" Wilson – slide and rhythm guitar, harmonica, vocals; Henry "The Sunflower" Vestine – lead guitar; Larry "The Mole" Taylor – bass; Adolfo "Fito" de la Parra – drums	Boogie with Canned Heat (1968); Living the Blues (1968); Hallelujah (1969); Live at Topanga Corral (1971)
July 1969	Bob "The Bear" Hite – vocals; Alan "Blind Owl" Wilson – slide and rhythm guitar, harmonica, vocals; Larry "The Mole" Taylor – bass; Adolfo "Fito" de la Parra – drums; Mike Bloomfield – lead guitar (temporary)	none - one gig
July 1969 – August 1970 Classic line-up #2	Bob "The Bear" Hite – vocals; Alan "Blind Owl" Wilson – slide and rhythm guitar, harmonica, vocals; Larry "The Mole" Taylor – bass; Adolfo "Fito" de la Parra – drums; Harvey "The Snake" Mandel – lead guitar	Future Blues (1970); Canned Heat '70 Concert Live in Europe (1970)
August – 3 September 1970	Bob "The Bear" Hite – vocals; Alan "Blind Owl" Wilson – slide and rhythm guitar, harmonica, vocals; Henry "The Sunflower" Vestine – lead guitar; Adolfo "Fito" de la Parra – drums; Antonio de la Barreda – bass	Hooker 'n Heat (1971) with John Lee Hooker
September 1970 – 1973	Bob "The Bear" Hite – vocals; Henry "The Sunflower" Vestine – lead guitar; Adolfo "Fito" de la Parra – drums; Antonio de la Barreda – bass; Joel Scott Hill – rhythm guitar, vocals	Historical Figures and Ancient Heads (1971); Live at Turku Festival (1995)
1973 – 1974	Bob "The Bear" Hite – vocals; Henry "The Sunflower" Vestine – lead guitar; Adolfo "Fito" de la Parra – drums; Ed Beyer – keyboards; Richard Hite – bass, rhythm guitar, vocals; James Shane – rhythm and lead guitar, bass, vocals	The New Age (1973); One More River to Cross (1973); Live at Montreux 1973 (2011)
1974–1976	Bob "The Bear" Hite – vocals; Adolfo "Fito" de la Parra – drums; Richard Hite – bass; Chris Morgan – lead guitar; Gene Taylor – keyboards, rhythm guitar	none
1976	Bob "The Bear" Hite – vocals; Adolfo "Fito" de la Parra – drums; Richard Hite – bass; Chris Morgan – rhythm guitar; Stan Webb – lead guitar	none
1976–1977	Bob "The Bear" Hite – vocals; Adolfo "Fito" de la Parra – drums; Richard Hite – bass; Chris Morgan – rhythm and slide guitar; Mark Skyer – lead guitar	Human Condition (1978); Hooker 'n Heat, Live at the Fox Venice Theatre (1981)
1977–1978	Bob "The Bear" Hite – vocals, guitar, harmonica; Adolfo "Fito" de la Parra – drums; Richard Exley – bass	none
1978	Bob "The Bear" Hite – vocals; Larry "The Mole" Taylor – bass; Adolfo "Fito" de la Parra – drums; Ronnie Barron – keyboards; Mike "Hollywood Fats" Mann – lead and rhythm guitar	King Biscuit Flower Hour (1995)
1978–1980	Bob "The Bear" Hite – vocals; Larry "The Mole" Taylor – bass; Adolfo "Fito" de la Parra – drums; Mike "Hollywood Fats" Mann – lead guitar; Jay Spell – keyboards; Mike Halby – rhythm guitar	none
1980	Bob "The Bear" Hite – vocals; Henry "The Sunflower" Vestine – lead guitar; Adolfo "Fito" de la Parra – drums; Jay Spell – keyboards; Mike Halby – rhythm guitar; Jon Lamb – bass	none
1980	Bob "The Bear" Hite – vocals; Henry "The Sunflower" Vestine – lead guitar; Adolfo "Fito" de la Parra – drums; Mike Halby – rhythm guitar; Jon Lamb – bass	none
1980–1981	Bob "The Bear" Hite – vocals; Henry "The Sunflower" Vestine – lead guitar; Adolfo "Fito" de la Parra – drums; Mike Halby – rhythm guitar; Ernie Rodriguez – bass	Kings of the Boogie (Dog House Blues) (1981)
1981	Henry "The Sunflower" Vestine – lead guitar; Adolfo "Fito" de la Parra – drums; Mike Halby – rhythm guitar; Ernie Rodriguez – bass; Richard Kellogg – vocals, harmonica	Kings of the Boogie (Dog House Blues) (1981)
1981–1984	Adolfo "Fito" de la Parra – drums; Mike Halby – rhythm guitar; Ernie Rodriguez – bass; Richard Kellogg – vocals, harmonica; Walter Trout – lead guitar, vocals	Boogie Assault (1991)
1984–1985	Adolfo "Fito" de la Parra – drums; Ernie Rodriguez – bass; Richard Kellogg – vocals, harmonica; Walter Trout – lead and rhythm guitar, vocals	none
1985–1987	Henry "The Sunflower" Vestine – lead guitar; Adolfo "Fito" de la Parra – drums; Skip Jones – bass; James Thornbury – vocals, rhythm guitar, harmonica	none
1987	Henry "The Sunflower" Vestine – lead guitar; Larry "The Mole" Taylor – bass; Adolfo "Fito" de la Parra – drums; James Thornbury – vocals, rhythm guitar, harmonica	Boogie up the Country (1987)
1987–1988	Henry "The Sunflower" Vestine – lead guitar; Larry "The Mole" Taylor – bass; Adolfo "Fito" de la Parra – drums; James Thornbury – vocals, rhythm guitar, harmonica; Ronnie Barron – keyboards	none
1988–1990	Larry "The Mole" Taylor – bass; Adolfo "Fito" de la Parra – drums; James Thornbury – vocals, rhythm guitar, harmonica; Junior Watson – lead guitar	Reheated (1988); Burnin' Live (1991)
1990–1992	Larry "The Mole" Taylor – bass; Adolfo "Fito" de la Parra – drums; Harvey "The Snake" Mandel – lead guitar; James Thornbury – vocals, rhythm guitar, harmonica; Ron Shumake – bass	none
1992	Larry "The Mole" Taylor – bass; Adolfo "Fito" de la Parra – drums; James Thornbury – vocals, rhythm guitar, harmonica; Ron Shumake – bass; Becky Barksdale – lead guitar	none
1992	Larry "The Mole" Taylor – bass; Adolfo "Fito" de la Parra – drums; James Thornbury – vocals, rhythm guitar, harmonica; Ron Shumake – bass; Smokey Hormel – lead guitar	none
1992–1995	Henry "The Sunflower" Vestine – lead guitar; Adolfo "Fito" de la Parra – drums; James Thornbury – vocals, rhythm guitar, harmonica; Ron Shumake – bass; Junior Watson – lead and rhythm guitar	Internal Combustion (1994)
1995–1996	Henry "The Sunflower" Vestine – lead and rhythm guitar; Adolfo "Fito" de la Parra – drums; Ron Shumake – bass; Junior Watson – lead and rhythm guitar; Robert Lucas – vocals, rhythm guitar, harmonica	none
1996	Henry "The Sunflower" Vestine – lead and rhythm guitar; Adolfo "Fito" de la Parra – drums; Harvey "The Snake" Mandel – lead and rhythm guitar; Junior Watson – lead and rhythm guitar; Robert Lucas – vocals, rhythm guitar, harmonica; Mark "Pocket" Goldberg – bass	none
1996	Henry "The Sunflower" Vestine – lead and rhythm guitar; Adolfo "Fito" de la Parra – drums; Harvey "The Snake" Mandel – lead and rhythm guitar; Junior Watson – lead and rhythm guitar; Robert Lucas – vocals, rhythm guitar, harmonica; Greg Kage – bass	none
1996–1997	Henry "The Sunflower" Vestine – lead and rhythm guitar; Larry "The Mole" Taylor – bass; Adolfo "Fito" de la Parra – drums; Harvey "The Snake" Mandel – lead and rhythm guitar; Junior Watson – lead and rhythm guitar; Robert Lucas – vocals, rhythm guitar, harmonica; Greg Kage – bass	Canned Heat Blues Band (1996)
1997–1999	Adolfo "Fito" de la Parra – drums; Harvey "The Snake" Mandel – lead and rhythm guitar; Robert Lucas – vocals, rhythm guitar, harmonica; Greg Kage – bass; Paul Bryant – lead and rhythm guitar	none
1999	Larry Taylor – lead guitar, vocals; Adolfo "Fito" de la Parra – drums; Robert Lucas – vocals, rhythm guitar, harmonica; Greg Kage – bass	Boogie 2000 (1999)
1999–2000	Adolfo "Fito" de la Parra – drums; Robert Lucas – vocals, rhythm guitar, harmonica; Greg Kage – bass; Paul Bryant – lead guitar	none
2000–2005	Adolfo "Fito" de la Parra – drums; Greg Kage – bass; Stanley "The Baron" Behrens – harmonica, vocals, saxophone, flute; Dallas Hodge – vocals, rhythm, lead and slide guitar; John Paulus – lead, slide and rhythm guitar	Friends in the Can (2003)
2005	Adolfo "Fito" de la Parra – drums; Greg Kage – bass; Stanley "The Baron" Behrens – harmonica, vocals, saxophone, flute; Dallas Hodge – vocals, rhythm guitar; Don Preston – lead guitar	none
2005–2006	Adolfo "Fito" de la Parra – drums; Robert Lucas – vocals, rhythm guitar, harmonica; Greg Kage – bass; John Paulus – lead guitar	none
2006–2008	Adolfo "Fito" de la Parra – drums; Robert Lucas – vocals, rhythm guitar, harmonica; Greg Kage – bass; Barry Levenson – lead guitar	none
2008–2010	Larry "The Mole" Taylor – bass, rhythm and lead guitar, vocals; Adolfo "Fito" de la Parra – drums; Harvey "The Snake" Mandel – lead and rhythm guitar; Greg Kage – bass; Barry Levenson – lead and rhythm guitar; Dale Wesley Spalding – vocals, rhythm guitar, harmonica, bass	none
2010–2014	Larry "The Mole" Taylor – bass, rhythm and lead guitar, vocals; Adolfo "Fito" de la Parra – drums; Harvey "The Snake" Mandel – lead guitar; Dale Wesley Spalding – vocals, rhythm guitar, harmonica, bass	none
2014–2019	Larry "The Mole" Taylor – bass, rhythm and lead guitar, vocals; Adolfo "Fito" de la Parra – drums; Dale Wesley Spalding – vocals, rhythm guitar, harmonica, bass; John Paulus – lead guitar, bass, backing vocals	none
2019–2021	Adolfo "Fito" de la Parra – drums; Dale Wesley Spalding – vocals, rhythm guitar, harmonica; John Paulus – lead guitar, backing vocals; Rick Reed – bass	
2021–present	Adolfo "Fito" de la Parra – drums; Dale Wesley Spalding – vocals, rhythm guitar, harmonica; Rick Reed – bass; Jimmy Vivino – lead guitar, keyboards, vocals	Finyl Vinyl (2024)
