= Canned Heat discography =

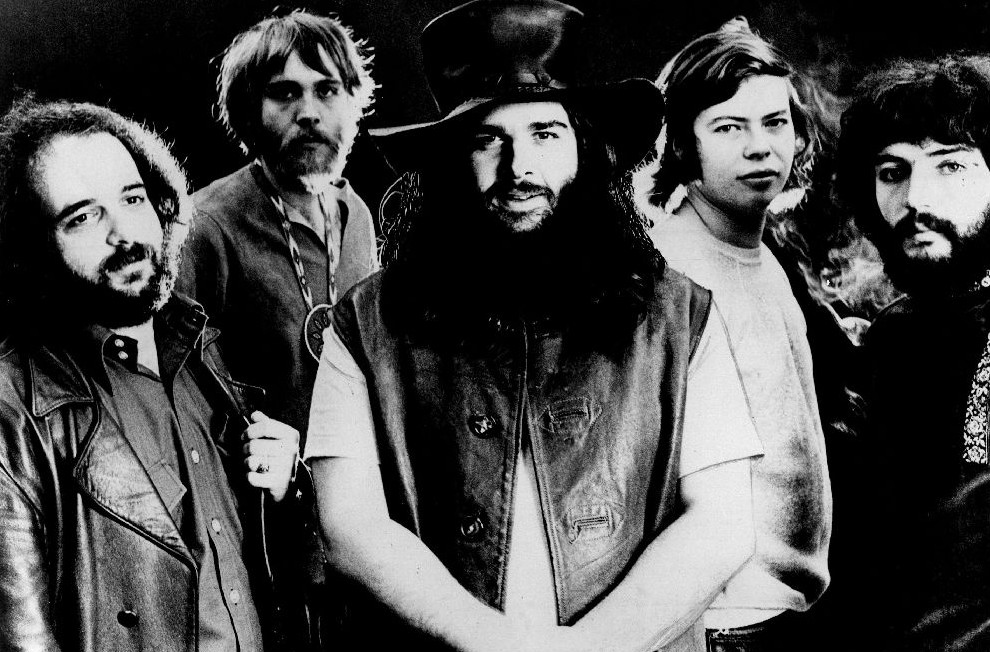
Canned Heat's lineup in 1970

This is the discography for American blues rock band Canned Heat.

== Studio albums ==
Title	Album details	Peak chart positions					
Title	Album details	US	US Blues	AUS	CAN	GER	UK
Canned Heat	Released: 1967; Label: Liberty Records	76	—	—	—	33	—
Boogie with Canned Heat	Released: 1968; Label: Liberty Records	16	—	—	20	—	5
Living the Blues	Released: 1968; Label: Liberty Records	18	—	—	18	26	—
Hallelujah	Released: 1969; Label: Liberty Records	37	—	—	29	—	—
Future Blues	Released: 1970; Label: Liberty Records	59	—	14	24	—	27
Vintage (recorded 1966)	Released: 1970; Label: Janus Records	173	—	—	—	—	—
Historical Figures and Ancient Heads	Released: 1971; Label: United Artists	87	—	20	50	—	—
The New Age	Released: 1973; Label: United Artists	—	—	—	75	—	—
One More River to Cross	Released: 1973; Label: Atlantic Records	—	—	—	—	—	—
Human Condition	Released: 1978; Label: Takoma; Sonet	—	—	—	—	—	—
Kings of the Boogie (Dog House Blues)	Released: 1981; Label: Destiny Records	—	—	—	—	—	—
Reheated	Released: 1988; Label: SPV; Dali/Chameleon	—	—	—	—	—	—
Internal Combustion	Released: 1994; Label: AIM; River Road	—	—	—	—	—	—
Canned Heat Blues Band	Released: 1996; Label: Ruf Records	—	—	—	—	—	—
Boogie 2000	Released: 1999; Label: Ruf Records	—	—	—	—	—	—
Friends in the Can	Released: 2003; Label: Ruf Records	—	14	—	—	—	—
Christmas Album	Released: 2007; Label: Ruf Records	—	5	—	—	—	—
Finyl Vinyl	Released: 2024; Label: Ruf Records	—	2	—	—	—	—

== Collaborative albums ==
Title	Album details	Peak chart positions		
Title	Album details	US	AUS	UK
Hooker 'n Heat (with John Lee Hooker)	Released: 1971; Label: Liberty Records	73	24	50
Gate's on the Heat (with Clarence "Gatemouth" Brown)	Released: 1973; Label: Barclay	—	—	—
Memphis Heat (with Memphis Slim)	Released: 1974; Label: Barclay	—	—	—

== Live albums ==
Title	Album details	Peak chart positions			
Title	Album details	US	AUS	CAN	UK
Canned Heat '70 Concert Live in Europe	Released: 1970; Label: Liberty Records	133	12	39	15
Live at Topanga Corral	Released: 1971; Label: Wand Records	—	—	—	—
Captured Live	Released: 1980; Label: Accord	—	—	—	—
Hooker 'n Heat: Recorded Live at the Fox Venice Theatre	Released: 1981; Label: Rhino	—	—	—	—
Boogie up the Country	Released: 1987; Label:	—	—	—	—
The Boogie Assault (reissues as Live in Oz)	Released: 1987; Label: AIM	—	—	—	—
Burnin' Live	Released: 1991; Label: AIM	—	—	—	—
Canned Heat Live	Released: 1993; Label: Altaya	—	—	—	—
In Concert (King Biscuit Flower Hour) (see King Biscuit Flower Hour)	Released: 1995; Label: King Biscuit Flower Hour Records	—	—	—	—
Live at the Turku Rock Festival	Released: 2007; Label: Friday Music	—	—	—	—
Live at Montreux 1973	Released: 2011; Label: Eagle Records	—	—	—	—

== Compilation albums ==
Title	Charts				Released	Label
Title	US	AUS	UK	CAN	Released	Label
The Canned Heat Cook Book (The Best of Canned Heat)	86	17	8	74	1969	Liberty
Canned Heat Collage	-	-	-	-	1971	Sunset
The Best of Canned Heat	-	-	-	-	1972 (1987 CD)	EMI Manhattan
The Very Best of Canned Heat	-	-	-	-	1975	United Artists
Let's Work Together: The Best of Canned Heat			-	-	1989	EMI
On the Road Again			-	-	1989	EMI
The Big Heat			-	-	1992 (3-CD set)	EMI
Uncanned! The Best of Canned Heat			-	-	1994	EMI
Best of Hooker 'n Heat			-	-	1996	EMI
Straight Ahead (from Vintage [1966] + Live at Topanga [1969])			-	-	1996	Magnum
The Ties That Bind - The Lost '74 Sessions			-	-	1997	Archive Recordings; Friday Music
House of Blue Lights			-	-	1998	
1967-1976: The Boogie House Tapes			-	-	2000	Ruf Records
The USA Sessions			-	-	2003	
The Boogie House Tapes, Volume 2			-	-	2004	Ruf Records
Instrumentals 1967-1996			-	-	2006	Ruf Records
Under the Dutch Skies 1970-74			-	-	2007	Major League Productions
The Very Best of Canned Heat			-	-	2005	Capitol/EMI
The Boogie House Tapes, Volume 3			-	-	2008	Ruf Records
Revolution			-	-	2012	Canned Heat Music
The Blind Owl (Alan Wilson with Canned Heat)			-	-	2013	Severn

== Singles ==
Year	Single (A-side, B-side) Both sides from same album except where indicated	Chart positions			Album
Year	Single (A-side, B-side) Both sides from same album except where indicated	US	UK	CAN	Album
1967	"Rollin' and Tumblin'" b/w "Bullfrog Blues"	115	-	-	Canned Heat
1967	"World in a Jug" b/w "Evil Woman"	-	-	-	Boogie with Canned Heat
1968	"On the Road Again" b/w "Boogie Music" (from Living the Blues)	16	8	8	Boogie with Canned Heat
1968	"The Christmas Blues" b/w "The Chipmunk Song" with The Chipmunks	-	-	-	Non-album tracks
1968	"Going Up the Country" b/w "One Kind Favor"	11	19	5	Living the Blues
1969	"Time Was" b/w Low Down"	67	-	46	Hallelujah
1969	"Poor Moon" b/w "Sic 'Em Pigs" (from Hallelujah)	119	-	-	Non-album track
1970	"Spoonful" b/w "Big Road Blues"	-	-	-	Vintage
1970	"Let's Work Together" b/w "I'm Her Man" (from Hallelujah)	26	2	15	Future Blues
1970	"Sugar Bee" b/w "Shake It and Break It"	-	49	-	Future Blues
1970	"Future Blues" b/w "Going Up the Country" (from Canned Heat Cookbook (The Best of Canned Heat))	-	-	-	Future Blues
1971	"Wooly Bully" b/w "My Time Ain't Long" (from Future Blues)	105	-	-	Non-album track
1971	"Whiskey and Wimmen'" b/w "Let's Make It" both sides with John Lee Hooker	-	-	-	Hooker 'N Heat
1971	"Long Way from L.A." b/w "Hill's Stomp"	-	52 (Note: Chart position is from the official UK "Breakers List".)	-	Historical Figures and Ancient Heads
1972	"Rockin' with the King" b/w "I Don't Care What You Tell Me"	88	-	-	Historical Figures and Ancient Heads
1972	"Cherokee Dance" b/w "Sneakin' Around"	-	-	-	Historical Figures and Ancient Heads
1973	"Rock and Roll Music" b/w "Lookin' for My Rainbow" (with Clara Ward & the Clara Ward Singers)	-	-	-	The New Age
1973	"Harley Davidson Blues" b/w "You Can Run, But You Sure Can't Hide"	-	-	-	The New Age
1974	"One More River to Cross" b/w "Highway 401"	-	-	-	One More River to Cross
1974	"The Harder They Come" b/w "Rock 'N Roll Show"	-	-	-	Non-album tracks
