= Clara Ward =

American gospel singer (1924–1973)

- Ward in 1970

Background information
- Born: Clara Mae Ward; April 21, 1924; Philadelphia, Pennsylvania, U.S.
- Died: January 16, 1973 (aged 48) Los Angeles, California, U.S.
- Genres: Gospel
- Occupations: Singer; songwriter; arranger
- Years active: 1931–1972
- Labels: Stateside; Vanguard

Clara Mae Ward (April 21, 1924 – January 16, 1973) was an American gospel singer who achieved great artistic and commercial success during the 1940s and 1950s, as leader of The Famous Ward Singers. A gifted singer and arranger, Ward adopted the lead-switching style, previously used primarily by male gospel quartets, creating opportunities for spontaneous improvisation and vamping by each member of the group, while giving virtuoso singers such as Marion Williams the opportunity to perform the lead vocal in songs such as "Surely, God Is Able" (among the first million-selling gospel hits), "How I Got Over" and "Packin' Up". The album Surely God Is Able by The Famous Ward Singers was the first by a gospel group to exceed sales of 500,000 units.

== Career ==
Ward's mother, Gertrude Mae Ward (née Murphy; 1901–1981), founded the Ward Singers in 1931 as a family group, then called, variously, the Consecrated Gospel Singers or the Ward Trio, consisting of herself, her youngest daughter Clara, and her elder daughter, Willarene Mae ("Willa," 1920–2012). Ward recorded her first solo song in 1940, and continued accompanying the Ward Gospel Trio, thereafter.

=== 1931–1952: The Ward Singers ===
The Ward Singers began touring nationally in 1943, following a memorable appearance at the National Baptist Convention held in Philadelphia, Pennsylvania, earlier that year. Henrietta Waddy joined the group in 1947. The group's performance style, such as the mimed packing of suitcases as part of the song "Packin' Up", condemned by some gospel music purists as "clowning", was wildly popular with their audiences.

The addition of Marion Williams in 1947 provided an additional talent to the group, whose broad soprano range and ability to descend into "growling low notes" in the style of a country preacher, helped make the group nationally popular when they began recording in 1948.

In 1949, the Ward Singers toured from Philadelphia to California in their new Cadillac, appeared on national television programs, and recorded for the Miltone Record Company of Los Angeles. The Miltone recordings were purchased in a multi-artist package by Gotham Record Company, which had moved to Philadelphia. Gotham's Irv Ballen recorded some new Ward material, including "Surely God Is Able", and some of the Ward Singers' Gotham recordings were transferred to Savoy Record Company in Newark, New Jersey to settle a contract dispute. When Savoy began contracting with the Ward Singers for new recordings in the 1950s, they were primarily recorded and engineered in Bergen County, New Jersey by Rudy Van Gelder.

In 1950, Clara Ward and the Ward Singers of Philadelphia made their first Carnegie Hall appearance on a gospel program titled Negro Music Festival, produced by gospel music pioneer, Joe Bostic, sharing the stage with Mahalia Jackson, appearing at the famed venue for Bostic's program in 1952, as well.

Gertrude Ward created a booking agency for gospel acts, sponsored tours under the name "the Ward Gospel Cavalcade", established a publishing house for gospel music, and wrote an instructional manual for churches, detailing how to promote gospel programs. Gertrude created and managed a second group, "the Clara Ward Specials", to accompany the Ward Singers. Although as musical director of the Ward franchise, Clara was willing to share the spotlight with her talented co-singers, she and her mother were allegedly reticent about sharing the group's financial rewards with other members, as well.

According to Willa Ward's biography of Clara Ward, with the exception of Gertrude and Clara, Willa and other members of the group were grossly underpaid. In addition, their meager earnings were further reduced as Gertrude and Clara provided the group's housing and charged them for it. Accordingly, stars such as Marion Williams and Frances Steadman not only had to accept second billing and lesser pay for their work, but pay their employers rent out of their earnings.

Williams left the group in 1958, when her demand for a raise and reimbursement for hotel expenses was rejected. She was followed shortly thereafter by the rest of the group — Henrietta Waddy, Esther Ford, Frances Steadman and Kitty Parham — who formed a new group, "the Stars of Faith". Their departure marked the end of the glory days for the Ward Singers, who later alienated much of their churchgoing audience by performing in Las Vegas, nightclubs, and other secular venues in the 1960s. By this time, gospel singer Albertina Walker formed her group, the Caravans, in 1952, following the advice of her mentor Mahalia Jackson, and their group began to grow in popularity.

In 1963, Clara Ward was the second gospel singer to sing gospel songs on Broadway in Langston Hughes' play Tambourines to Glory (the first being her former group members, which were known as the Stars of Faith, which starred Langston Hughes in the first Gospel stage play and first play that featured an all black cast to be produced on Broadway, The Black Nativity.). She was also the play's musical director.

=== 1953–1972: The Clara Ward Singers ===
The group in Vietnam, 1966

Ward was the first gospel singer to sing with a 100-piece symphony orchestra in the 1960s. The Clara Ward Singers recorded an album together on the Verve label, V-5019, The Heart, the Faith, the Soul of Clara Ward, and the Ward Singers performed their music live in Philadelphia with the city's Symphony and the Golden Voices Ensemble. Ward sang backup for pop artists with her sister Willa's background group, most notably on Dee Dee Sharp's hit, "Mashed Potato Time", which reached No. 2 on the Billboard Hot 100 in 1962.

In 1969, Ward recorded an album for Capitol Records, Soul and Inspiration, consisting of pop songs from Broadway plays, Hollywood movies and the Jimmy Radcliffe song of hope "If You Wanna Change the World". The album was later reissued on the Capitol's budget Pickwick label minus one track. In the same year, she recorded an album in Copenhagen, Denmark on the Philips label, Walk A Mile In My Shoes, which included the pop title song, other pop songs (such as "California Dreaming") and a few gospel songs.

Ward also recorded an album for MGM/Verve, Hang Your Tears Out To Dry, which included country and Western, blues/folk, pop and an arrangement of the Beatles' hit song, "Help". Her 1972 album Uplifting on United Artists, produced by Nikolas Venet and Sam Alexander, included an interpretation of Bill Wither's pop hit "Lean On Me" and a rearrangement of the Soul Stirrers' 1950s recording of "Thank You, Jesus". Also in 1972 Ward, because she was under exclusive contract to United Artists at this time, provided vocals for a Canned Heat's album The New Age, on the ballad "Lookin' For My Rainbow"; it was released on that album and as a single 45 rpm record.

In 1968, the Clara Ward Singers toured Vietnam at the request of the U.S. State Department and the U.S.O. It was a popular war-time tour supported by recorded radio broadcasts of the Ward Singers on U.S. Armed Forces Radio. The Ward Singers narrowly missed death when their hotel in Vietnam was bombed and several guests died. Ward was invited back to Vietnam by U.S.O. in 1969 for several more months. These war-time tours were filmed and all the Ward Singers were given special certificates of recognition by the U.S. Army.

Ward co-starred in the Hollywood movie A Time to Sing, starring Hank Williams, Jr., and Shelley Fabares, Ed Begley. She was cast as a waitress in a Nashville cafeteria who inspires a young singer, played by Williams, to pursue his dream of becoming a country recording artist. There are also several scenes of the Clara Ward Singers performing gospel songs in the film. This movie was released by MGM in 1968 and Clara's picture appears on lobby cards and other movie advertisements.

Other movie appearances include Its Your Thing, starring the Isley Brothers, and Spree, also known as Night Time In Las Vegas. The Clara Ward Singers toured in Australia, Japan, Europe, Indonesia, and Thailand during the late-1960s through the early-1970s. They had a one-day TV special in London, England. They were in constant demand on American television programs and appeared on The Mike Douglas Show over a dozen times. They appeared on Oral Roberts' Country Roads TV special, later released as a soundtrack album. In 1969, The Clara Ward Singers appeared on the Monkees' television special 33 1/3 Revolutions Per Monkee. Clara continued to perform at her mother's church, the Miracle Temple of Faith for All People in Los Angeles, California, as well as at Victory Baptist Church. Her mother, Gertrude Ward, also had a popular religious radio program in the Los Angeles market.

== Health, death, and legacy ==
Ward collapsed while performing at the Castaways Lounge in Miami Beach, Florida in May 1966. Ward suffered a series of strokes prior to her death. The first occurred in August 1967 which was listed as "massive". Two more strokes followed: one listed as "minor" during a recording session at her home in December 1972; another on January 9, 1973, which left Ward in a coma.

Ward died on January 16, 1973 at age 48 as a result of several strokes. Aretha Franklin and Rev. C. L. Franklin sang at her funeral in Philadelphia; Marion Williams sang at her second memorial service held days later in Los Angeles.

Clara Ward is interred in the Forest Lawn Memorial Park Cemetery in Glendale, California.

In 1977, Ward was honored posthumously at the Songwriters Hall of Fame in New York City and her surviving sister, Willa, accepted the award in her honor.

In July 1998, in recognition of her status, the United States Postal Service issued a 32-cent stamp with her image. The stamp can still be purchased with a CD and other gospel singers' stamps online.

== Discography ==
- Gospel Concert (Dot, 1958)
- Hallelujah! (Dot, 1958)
- I Feel the Holy Spirit (Savoy, 1959) with The Famous Ward Singers
- Hymns (Dot, 1960)
- That Old Landmark (Savoy, 1960) with The Famous Ward Singers
- The Ways of the Lord (Dot, 1961)
- Some in the Room (Fontana, 1962)
- Clara Ward and Her Gospel Singers at the Village Gate (Vanguard VRS-9135, 1963)
- Gospel Concert (Roulette, 1964) France only
- Down by the Riverside (Hamilton, 1965)
- Hang Your Tears Out to Dry (Verve, 1966)
- The Heart The Faith The Soul of Clara Ward (Verve, 1967)
- Soul & Inspiration (Capitol, 1969)
- Walk a Mile in My Shoes (Philips, 1971)
- A Vision Of Truth (Nashboro, 1972) with The Famous Ward Singers
- Essence (Nashboro, 1972)
- Receive Me Lord (Nashboro, 1973)
- We Remember Clara Ward (HOB, 1973)
- Live (AVI, 1981) with The Famous Ward Singers, rec. at the War Memorial Auditorium, Nashville
- Somebody Bigger Than You & I (Geffen, 1999) Clara Ward and The Clara Ward Singers

== See also ==
- List of best-selling gospel music artists
