= Historical Figures and Ancient Heads =

Studio album by Canned Heat
- Released: December 14, 1971
- Recorded: 1971
- Studio: Village Recorder, Los Angeles
- Genre: Blues rock
- Length: 36:28
- Label: United Artists
- Producer: Skip Taylor, Jim Taylor

Canned Heat chronology
| Live at Topanga Corral (1971) | Historical Figures and Ancient Heads (1971) | The New Age (1973) |

Professional ratings
Review scores
| Source | Rating |
|---|---|
| AllMusic | 3/5 stars |
| Christgau's Record Guide | C− |

Historical Figures and Ancient Heads is the eighth album by American blues rock band Canned Heat, released in 1971. It was the first album not to feature original member and songwriter Alan Wilson who had died the previous year, and their bassist Larry Taylor, who had left to join John Mayall's band. Featuring new guitarman Joel Scott Hill and Little Richard on "Rockin' With the King". The record also includes Tony de la Barreda on bass, who left with Hill after this album and subsequent tour.

== Chart performance ==
The album debuted on Billboard magazine's Top LP's & Tape chart in the issue dated March 4, 1972, peaking at No. 87 during a twelve-week run on the chart.

== Track listing ==
1. "Sneakin' Around" (Jessie Mae Robinson) – 4:53
2. "Hill's Stomp" (Joel Scott Hill) – 3:03
3. "Rockin' with the King" (Skip Taylor, Richard Wayne Penniman) – 3:12
4. "I Don't Care What You Tell Me" (Charles Lloyd) – 3:55
5. "Long Way from L.A." (Jud Baker) – 3:06
6. "Cherokee Dance" (Robert Landers) – 4:26
7. "That's All Right" (Jimmy Rogers) – 5:28
8. "Utah" (Canned Heat) – 8:25

== Personnel ==
Canned Heat

- Bob Hite – vocals
- Henry Vestine – lead guitar
- Joel Scott Hill – rhythm guitar, vocals (on tracks 1 & 7), lead guitar (on track 2)
- Adolfo de la Parra – drums, piano (on track 5)
- Antonio de la Barreda – bass

Additional personnel

- Little Richard – piano and vocals (on track 3)
- Clifford Solomon – saxophone (on track 3)
- Charles Lloyd – flute (on track 4)
- Harvey Mandel – lead guitar (on track 7)
- Ernest Lane – piano (on track 1)
- Kevin Burton – organ (on track 4)
- Ray Bushbaum – piano (on track 7)

Production

- Produced by Skip and Jim Taylor

== Charts ==
| Chart (1972) | Peak position |
|---|---|
| US Billboard Top LPs & Tape | 87 |
