= Get Back Home in the U.S.A. =

Studio album by John Lee Hooker
- Released: 1970
- Recorded: November 30, 1969
- Studio: Monestier-Lemay Studio, Pau, France
- Genre: Blues
- Length: 69:37
- Label: Black & Blue
- Producer: Jacques Morgantini

John Lee Hooker chronology
I Wanna Dance All Night (1970)	Get Back Home in the U.S.A. (1970)	Hooker 'n Heat (1971)

Get Back Home in the U.S.A. is an album by blues musician John Lee Hooker that was recorded in France in 1969 and originally released by the French Black & Blue label. The album was reissued with 6 additional tracks in 1988 as Get Back Home.

== Reception ==
Professional ratings
Review scores
Source	Rating
AllMusic	4/5 stars
The Penguin Guide to Blues Recordings	2.5/4 stars

AllMusic reviewer Ron Wynn stated: "John Lee Hooker's greatness lies in his ability to perform the same songs the same way yet somehow sound different and memorable in the process. He operates at maximum efficiency in minimal surroundings with little production or assistance. That was the case on a 1969 session for Black and Blue; it was just Hooker and his guitar moaning, wailing, and narrating ... If you have ever heard any Hooker, you will not be surprised or stunned by these renditions; you will simply enjoy hearing him rework them one more time, finding a new word, phrase, line, or riff to inject".

== Track listing ==
All compositions credited to John Lee Hooker except where noted

1. "Get Back Home in the U.S.A." – 3:30
2. "T.B. Is Killing Me" – 5:02
3. "Cold Chills" – 4:36
4. "I Had a Dream Last Night" – 4:35
5. "Love Affair" – 3:46
6. "Little Rain" – 4:51
7. "When My First Wife Left Me" – 5:23
8. "Big Boss Lady" – 3:41
9. "Back to Your Mother" (Eddie Jones) – 5:11
10. "Boogie Chillen'" – 2:42
11. "Sitting Here Thinking" – 4:45 Additional track on CD reissue
12. "I Wanna Ramble" (Junior Parker) – 2:38 Additional track on CD reissue
13. "Hi-Heel Sneakers" (Tommy Tucker) – 3:03 Additional track on CD reissue
14. "I'm So Worried Baby" – 5:40 Additional track on CD reissue
15. "I'm Going Upstairs" – 4:00 Additional track on CD reissue
16. "Crazy 'Bout You" – 5:27 Additional track on CD reissue

== Personnel ==
- John Lee Hooker – guitar, vocals
