= Dallas Hodge =

American blues rock singer, guitarist, songwriter and record producer

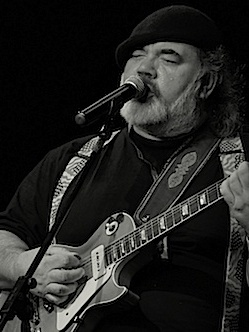

Background information
- Born: 1954 (age 71–72); Detroit, Michigan, United States
- Genres: Blues rock
- Occupations: Singer, guitarist, songwriter, record producer
- Instruments: Vocals, guitar
- Years active: 1970–present
- Website: www.dallashodge.com/Bio.html

Dallas Hodge (born 1954) is an American blues rock singer, guitarist, songwriter and record producer. He has released two solo albums since 2007, with the most recent, Don't Forget About The Music We Made (2019) appearing in the US Billboard Blues Albums Chart. Otherwise, Hodge is best known for his collaborations with Canned Heat and Steve Marriott.

He is the younger brother of fellow blues musician, Catfish Hodge.

== Life and career ==
Dallas Hodge was born in Detroit, Michigan, United States, and commenced guitar playing by the age of 13. His early musical inspiration came mainly from B.B. King and Freddie King. Hodge played in a number of local bands before joining his elder brother, Catfish Hodge, in 1970 and as the Catfish Hodge Band recorded a handful of albums. In 1978, Hodge relocated to Santa Cruz, California, where he met and played alongside Steve Marriott. Securing a recording contract with Atlantic Records, the record label was keen for Marriott to employ as many musicians from Humble Pie into the new arrangement, so Marriott reluctantly left Hodge behind as he advanced his own career. Hodge formed his own band called Deluxe and, in 1981, Dallas joined Johnny Winter on stage at a concert in San Francisco, California. He also played with, among others, Delbert McClinton and Bonnie Raitt. In 1981, the two brothers worked on the album, Catfish Hodge & Chicken Legs, and undertook a subsequent tour with Bonnie Raitt, Paul Barrere (Little Feat) and Cornell Dupree. Following a move to Los Angeles, California, in 1983, Hodge worked once more with brother, forming the Hodge Brothers Band. At that time the band comprised the two brothers plus the saxophonist David Woodford, drummer Larry Zack, pianist and saxophonist Marty Grebb, and keyboard player, Skip Van Winkle. From around this time until 2000, Hodge also ran a band based in his hometown, called the Detroit Allstars, which included among others Drew Abbott and Chris Campbell and Tim "The Professor" Sparling. They played a couple of mainly local concerts each year.

In 2000, Hodge was auditioned and joined Canned Heat as their frontman. They also re-recruited their original manager, Skip Taylor. In 2003, Canned Heat released, Friends in the Can, on which Hodge performed alongside John Paulus, Greg Kage, Stanley Behrens and Fito de la Parra. In 2005, Hodge left Canned Heat to focus on a solo career.

He formed the Motor City Rockin Rhythm & Blues at this time, and met the record producer Tom MacLear. This led to Hodge issuing his debut solo album, Reelin' (2007), on MEG Records. It was co-produced by Hodge and MacLear. The recording included contributions from Dallas Hodge (songwriter, guitar, vocals, co-producer); Catfish Hodge (songwriter); Terry Wilson (bass guitar); and Tony Braunagel (drums), among others. In 2009, Dallas was contacted by Alto Reed, who had previously worked as the saxophonist for Bob Seger, and invited to join Reed's West Coast Blues Entourage. In 2017, Hodge was a semi-finalist at the International Blues Challenge.

In 2019, Hodge got together a new outfit to record his second solo album. With Hodge on lead vocals and guitar, he was joined by Larry Zack (drums and percussion); Pat Wilkins (bass guitar, backing vocals); Robert Heft (slide guitar, backing vocals); and, Jon Greathouse (keyboards, backing vocals). A guest appearances was made by Coco Montoya, playing guitar on the tracks "Asking Too Much" and "Crossroads". The subsequent release, Don't Forget About The Music We Made, was a collection of nine songs, and became a new entry at number 7 on the Billboard Blues Albums Chart on July 27, 2019.

== Discography ==
=== Albums ===
Year	Title	Record label(s)
2007	Reelin'	MEG Records
2019	Don't Forget About The Music We Made	CD Baby

== See also ==
- List of blues rock musicians
