= One More River to Cross (album) =

Studio album by Canned Heat
- Released: 1973
- Recorded: 1973
- Studio: Muscle Shoals Sound Studio (Muscle Shoals, Alabama)
- Genre: Blues rock
- Length: 37:19
- Label: Atlantic
- Producer: Barry Beckett, Roger Hawkins

Canned Heat chronology
The New Age (1973)	One More River to Cross (1973)	Memphis Heat (1974)

Professional ratings
Review scores
Source	Rating
AllMusic	3/5 stars

One More River to Cross is the tenth studio album by American blues rock band Canned Heat, released in 1973. The band negotiated out of their contract with Liberty Records and debuted with Atlantic Records. This album featured horn arrangements played by the Muscle Shoal Horns along with Barry Beckett and Roger Hawkins. The album cover was designed by Ernie Cefalu.

== Track listing ==
1. "One More River to Cross" (Daniel Moore) – 3:10
2. "L.A. Town" (Canned Heat) – 3:28
3. "I Need Someone" (Bob Hite) – 4:54
4. "Bagful of Boogie" (Canned Heat) – 3:34
5. "I'm a Hog for You Baby" (Jerry Leiber, Mike Stoller) – 2:40
6. "You Am What You Am" (James Shane) – 4:31
7. "Shake, Rattle and Roll" (Charles E. Calhoun, Joel Scott Hill) – 2:31
8. "Bright Times Are Comin'" (Canned Heat) – 3:11
9. "Highway 401" (Canned Heat) – 3:53
10. "We Remember Fats" (Fats Domino Medley) (Dave Bartholomew, Fats Domino, Al Lewis) – 5:07

== Personnel ==
Canned Heat

- Bob Hite – vocals, harmonica
- Henry Vestine – lead guitar
- James Shane – rhythm guitar, vocals; bass on "Shake, Rattle and Roll"
- Ed Beyer – keyboards
- Richard Hite – bass, vocals; rhythm guitar on "Shake, Rattle and Roll"
- Adolfo de la Parra – drums

Additional personnel

- Muscle Shoal Horns – horns
- Roger Hawkins – drums
- Barry Beckett – keyboards

Production

- Barry Beckett – producer
- Roger Hawkins – producer
- Jerry Masters – engineer
- Steve Melton – engineer
