= The New Age (album) =

Studio album by Canned Heat
- Released: March 9, 1973
- Recorded: 1972
- Studio: The Record Plant, Los Angeles
- Genre: Blues rock
- Length: 36:32
- Label: United Artists
- Producer: Skip Taylor

Canned Heat chronology
Historical Figures and Ancient Heads (1971)	The New Age (1973)	One More River to Cross (1973)

Professional ratings
Review scores
Source	Rating
AllMusic	2/5 stars

The New Age is the ninth studio album by American blues rock band Canned Heat, released in 1973. It was the first album to feature the talents of James Shane and Ed Beyer. Clara Ward also appears on the album in her last recording. Influential rock critic Lester Bangs was fired from Rolling Stone for writing a "disrespectful" review of this album upon its release.

== Track listing ==
1. "Keep It Clean" (Richard Hite) – 2:46
2. "Harley Davidson Blues" (James Shane) – 2:38
3. "Don't Deceive Me" (Hite) – 3:12
4. "You Can Run, But You Sure Can't Hide" (Ed Beyer) – 3:15
5. "Lookin' for My Rainbow" (Shane) – 5:24
6. "Rock and Roll Music" (Hite) – 2:29
7. "Framed" (Jerry Leiber and Mike Stoller) – 5:07
8. "Election Blues" (Beyer) – 6:04
9. "So Long Wrong" (Shane) – 5:36

== Personnel ==
Canned Heat

- Bob Hite – lead vocals (tracks 1, 4, 6–8); backing vocals (track 2)
- Henry Vestine – lead guitar (tracks 1–4, 6, 7, 9)
- James Shane – rhythm guitar (tracks 2, 4, 6, 7); lead guitar (track 9); dobro (track 5); slide dobro (track 8); bass (tracks 1, 3); backing vocals (tracks 1, 4); lead vocals (tracks 2, 5, 9)
- Ed Beyer – keyboards (all tracks)
- Richard Hite – bass (tracks 2, 4–7, 9); string bass (track 8); rhythm guitar (tracks 1, 3); tuba (track 4); backing vocals (tracks 1, 4); lead vocals (track 3)
- Adolfo de la Parra – drums (tracks 1–4, 6, 7, 9)

Additional personnel

- Clara Ward – vocals (track 5)

Production

- Skip Taylor – producer
- John Stronach – engineer
