= Live at Topanga Corral =

Live album by Canned Heat
- Released: 1971
- Recorded: 1968 at the Kaleidoscope in Hollywood, California
- Genre: Blues rock
- Length: 46:37
- Label: Wand
- Producer: Skip Taylor, Canned Heat

Canned Heat chronology
Hooker 'n Heat (1971)	Live at Topanga Corral (1971)	Historical Figures and Ancient Heads (1971)

Professional ratings
Review scores
Source	Rating
AllMusic	4/5 stars

Live at Topanga Corral is a 1971 live album by American blues rock band Canned Heat. It was taken from a 1968 concert at the Kaleidoscope in Hollywood, California, and not at the Topanga Corral as the title suggests. Canned Heat was under contract to Liberty Records at the time and Liberty did not want to do a live album, so manager Skip Taylor told Liberty that the album had been recorded in 1966 and 1967 at the Topanga Corral and released the record with Wand Records to avoid legal complications. The record has been bootlegged and reissued countless times, and is also known as Live at the Kaleidoscope.

== Track listing ==
1. "Bullfrog Blues" (Canned Heat) – 7:21
2. "Sweet Sixteen" (Joe Josea, B.B. King) – 10:57
3. "I'd Rather Be the Devil" (A. Leigh – actually Elmore James, Robert Johnson) – 5:10
4. "Dust My Broom" (Elmore James, Robert Johnson) – 5:46
5. "Wish You Would" (Billy Boy Arnold) – 8:03
6. "When Things Go Wrong" (A. Leigh – actually Hudson Whittaker) – 9:08

== Personnel ==
Canned Heat

- Bob Hite – vocals
- Alan Wilson – slide guitar, vocals, harmonica
- Henry Vestine – lead guitar
- Larry Taylor – bass
- Fito de la Parra – drums

Production

- "A Rainstory Production by Richard Moore and Michael O'Bryant" (as indicated on LP)
- Skip Taylor and Canned Heat – actual producers
