= Hallelujah (album) =

Studio album by Canned Heat
- Released: July 8, 1969
- Recorded: May 1969
- Studios: I.D. Sound Recorders (Hollywood, California)
- Genres: Blues rock; psychedelic rock
- Length: 38:04
- Label: Liberty
- Producer: Skip Taylor

Canned Heat chronology
Living the Blues (1968)	Hallelujah (1969)	Future Blues (1970)

Professional ratings
Review scores
Source	Rating
AllMusic	3/5 stars
Rolling Stone	(favorable)

Hallelujah is the fourth album by American blues rock band Canned Heat, released in 1969. It was re-released on CD in 2001 by MAM productions with four bonus tracks. It was the last album to feature classic lineup mark 1, as Vestine left the band prior to Future Blues.

== Chart performance ==
The album debuted on Billboard magazine's Top LP's chart in the issue dated August 9, 1969, peaking at No. 37 during a fifteen-week run on the chart.

== Track listing ==
=== Side One ===
1. "Same All Over" (Canned Heat) – 2:51
  - Bob Hite – lead vocals
  - Alan Wilson – guitar
  - Henry Vestine – guitar
  - Larry Taylor – bass
  - Fito De la Parra – drums
  - Elliot Ingber – backing vocals
  - Javier Batise – backing vocals
  - Skip Diamond – backing vocals
  - Ernest Lane – organ, piano
2. "Change My Ways" (Alan Wilson) – 2:47
  - Alan Wilson – lead vocals, whistling, guitar
  - Henry Vestine – guitar
  - Larry Taylor – bass
  - Fito De la Parra – drums
3. "Canned Heat" (Robert Hite Jr. – actually by Tommy Johnson) – 4:22
  - Bob Hite – lead vocals
  - Alan Wilson – guitar
  - Henry Vestine – guitar
  - Larry Taylor – bass
  - Fito De la Parra – drums
4. "Sic 'em Pigs" (Robert Hite Jr.; Booker T. White) – 2:41
  - Bob Hite – lead vocals
  - Alan Wilson – guitar
  - Henry Vestine – guitar
  - Larry Taylor – bass, backing vocals
  - Fito De la Parra – drums
5. "I'm Her Man" (A. Leigh – actually by Bob Hite) – 2:55
  - Bob Hite – lead vocals
  - Alan Wilson – guitar, harmonica
  - Henry Vestine – guitar
  - Larry Taylor – bass
  - Fito De la Parra – drums
  - Mark Naftalin – organ, piano
6. "Time Was" (Alan Wilson) – 3:21
  - Alan Wilson – guitar, lead vocals
  - Henry Vestine – guitar
  - Larry Taylor – bass
  - Fito De la Parra – drums

=== Side Two ===
1. "Do Not Enter" (Alan Wilson) – 2:50
  - Alan Wilson – guitar, lead vocals, harmonica
  - Larry Taylor – bass
  - Fito De la Parra – drums
2. "Big Fat (The Fat Man)" (Dave Bartholomew, Fats Domino; adapted by Robert Hite Jr.) – 1:57
  - Bob Hite – lead vocals, harmonica
  - Alan Wilson – guitar
  - Henry Vestine – guitar
  - Larry Taylor – bass
  - Fito De la Parra – drums
3. "Huautla" (V. Wolf – actually by Fito de la Parra) – 3:33
  - Alan Wilson – harmonica
  - Henry Vestine – guitar
  - Larry Taylor – bass
  - Fito De la Parra – drums
  - Mike Pacheco – bongos, congas
4. "Get Off My Back" (Alan Wilson) – 5:10
  - Alan Wilson – guitar, lead vocals
  - Henry Vestine – guitar
  - Larry Taylor – bass
  - Fito De la Parra – drums
5. "Down in the Gutter, But Free" (Canned Heat) – 5:37
  - Bob Hite – lead vocals
  - Alan Wilson – harmonica
  - Henry Vestine – bass
  - Larry Taylor – guitar
  - Fito De la Parra – drums
  - Skip Diamond – backing vocals
  - Elliot Ingber – backing vocals
  - Mark Naftalin – organ, piano

=== Bonus tracks from 2001 CD release ===
1. "Time Was" – Single Version (Wilson) – 2:34
2. "Low Down" (Canned Heat) – 2:30
3. "Poor Moon" (Wilson) – 2:43
4. "Sic 'em Pigs" – Single Version (Hite, White) – 1:54

== Personnel ==
Canned Heat

- Bob Hite – vocals, harmonica (on track 8)
- Alan Wilson – slide guitar, vocals, harmonica, whistling (on track 2)
- Henry Vestine – lead guitar, public service announcement (on track 4), bass (on track 11)
- Larry Taylor – bass, guitar (on track 11)
- Fito de la Parra – drums

Additional personnel

- Ernest Lane – piano (on track 1)
- Mark Naftalin – organ, piano (on tracks 5, 11)
- Javier Batiz – group vocals (on track 1)
- Skip Diamond – group vocals (on tracks 1, 11)
- Elliot Ingber – group vocals (on tracks 1, 11)
- Mike Pacheco – bongos and congas (on track 9)

Production

- Produced by Skip Taylor and Canned Heat
- Engineered by Richard Joseph Moore
- Recorded at I. D. Sound Recorders, Hollywood, California
  January, February, March, April, and May 1969

== Charts ==
Chart (1969)	Peak position
US Billboard Top LPs	37
