= Dale Spalding =

American singer

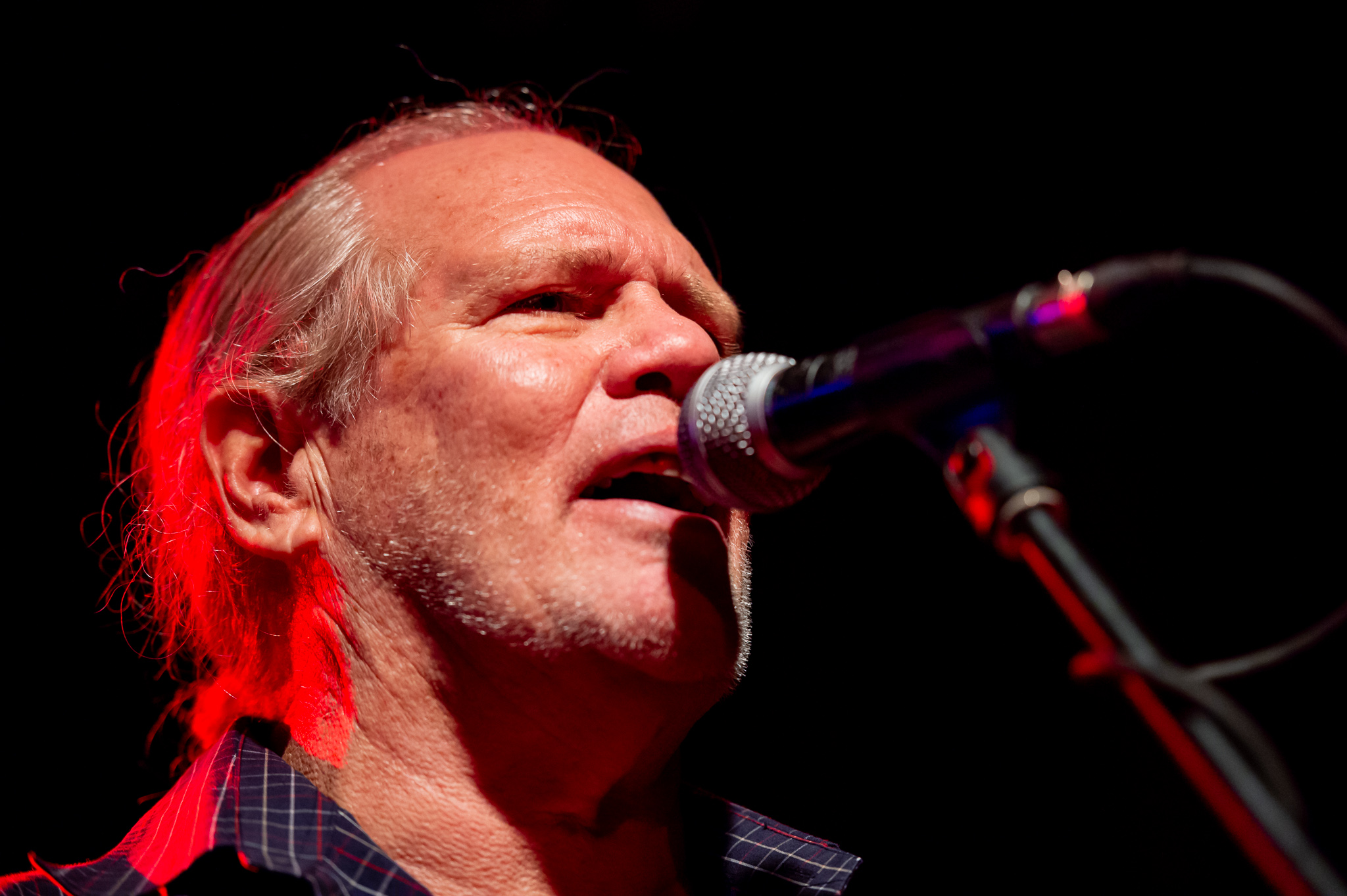
Dale Spalding (2018)

Dale Spalding is an American singer, harmonicist, guitarist and bassist, best known for his works with Poncho Sanchez and Canned Heat.

== Biography ==
Dale Spalding grew up in Downey, California, in a family of four children. As a teenager, he became interested in harmonica after listening to an album by Paul Butterfield. He also started playing the guitar. He is fascinated by rhythm and blues from New Orleans, Big Band Swing and British Invasion. He is also interested in blues legends like Muddy Waters, B. B. King, Little Walter, John Lee Hooker, and Canned Heat. Spalding also followed several musicians playing in Los Angeles, such as the Ashgrove and the Golden Bear.

In 1969, Spalding moved to San Francisco, where he played in clubs and studied harmonica with bluesman Sonny Terry. Terry introduced Spalding to his friends, among them Brownie McGhee, Willie Dixon, Johnny Shines, Lafayette Leake and Big Walter "Shakey" Horton.

Spalding later formed a duet with Duke Burrell, the pianist of Louis Jordan. Duke discovered Spalding's talent as a vocalist and encouraged him to sing more. The duet played together for ten years, during which Duke taught him a variety of jazz classics and ballads.

After the death of Burrell in the early 1990s, Spalding went back to Los Angeles, where he formed the Dale Spalding Band with bassist Tom Gargano, his long-time friend. The Dale Spalding Band regularly performs in Los Angeles, and has played with various musicians, including drummer James Gadson, saxophonist Lon Price and pianist Bruce "Funky Mal" Malament.

In 2000, Mexican conguero Poncho Sanchez discovered the Dale Spalding Band, and Spalding and Sanchez started working together. Spalding toured several times with Sanchez in the US and Japan. He also worked with Sanchez on Latin Spirits, and played the harmonica on the 2003 song '"MaryAnn", with Ray Charles on vocal.

In 2005, Spalding moved to New Orleans, and started working with roots rock band The Iguanas. Hurricane Katrina forced him to move once more, this time to Austin, Texas, where he was a founding member of Little Elmore Reed Blues Band [name of band, not a person with a band]. In 2007, his career took a new turn when he met Canned Heat drummer Fito de la Parra. After performing several times together, Fito invited him to join Canned Heat. In 2015, he released a live album with the band, entitled Songs from the Road. Spalding is still touring the world performing as front man for Canned Heat, solo, and occasionally with Poncho Sanchez.

Dale Spalding married actress Loretta Morrison on April 15, 2017, in New Orleans, LA They maintain their home in New Orleans, as well as Indianapolis.

Dale Spalding has also played and/or recorded with Dave Alvin, James Cotton, Marcia Ball, Ruthie Foster, Papa Mali, Otis Rush, Pinetop Perkins, Redd Volkaert and Amos Garrett among many others.

== Discography ==
- Solo work: One by one (2008)
- With Poncho Sanchez: Latin Spirits (2001)
- With Ruthie Foster: The Phenomenal Ruthie Foster (2007)
- With Robert Kyle: Blue Winds (2000)
- With Canned Heat: Songs From The Road (2015)
