= Canned Heat '70 Concert Live in Europe =

Canned Heat '70 Concert: Recorded Live in Europe

Live album by Canned Heat
- Released: June 1970 (UK); June 1971 (US)
- Recorded: April 1970
- Venue: Royal Albert Hall (London) and other UK venues
- Genre: Blues rock
- Length: 46:48
- Label: Liberty (UK), United Artists (US)
- Producer: Skip Taylor, Canned Heat

Canned Heat chronology
Vintage (1970)	Canned Heat '70 Concert: Recorded Live in Europe (1970)	Hooker 'n Heat (1971)

Professional ratings
Review scores
Source	Rating
AllMusic	4/5 stars

Canned Heat '70 Concert: Recorded Live in Europe is a 1970 live album by American blues rock band Canned Heat. It was taken from various locations on live concert European tour right before Alan Wilson's death and is the band's first officially released live album.

== Chart performance ==
The album debuted on Billboard magazine's Top LP's chart in the issue dated July 17, 1971, peaking at No. 133 during a nine-week run on the chart.

== Track listing ==
1. "That's All Right Mama" (Arthur "Big Boy" Crudup) – 9:02
2. "Bring It on Home" (Willie Dixon) – 6:18
3. "Pulling Hair Blues" (Alan Wilson, Samuel L. Taylor) – 9:20
4. Medley: "Back Out on the Road" (Robert Hite, Jr.) / "On the Road Again" (Floyd Jones, Alan Wilson, Tommy Johnson) – 6:00
5. "London Blues" (Alan Wilson) – 7:53
6. "Let's Work Together" (Wilbert Harrison) – 4:50
7. "Goodbye for Now" (Adolfo de la Parra, Harvey Mandel) – 3:25

== Personnel ==
Canned Heat

- Bob Hite – vocals
- Alan Wilson – slide guitar, vocals, harmonica
- Harvey Mandel – lead guitar
- Larry Taylor – bass
- Fito de la Parra – drums

Production

- Skip Taylor – "friend, manager and producer"
- Canned Heat – producer

== Charts ==
Chart (1971)	Peak position
US Billboard Top LPs	133
