= Robert Lucas (musician) =

- Born: July 25, 1962
- Died: November 23, 2008 (aged 46)
- Genres: Blues
- Occupation: Musician
- Formerly of: Bernie Pearl, Luke and the Locomotives, The Confessors, Canned Heat

Robert Lucas (July 25, 1962 – November 23, 2008) was an American blues musician, singer, guitarist and harmonica player, who became the front man for the group Canned Heat in the mid-1990s and was also a solo artist.

== Background ==
=== Personal life ===
Lucas came from a middle-class family, and grew up in Long Beach, California. He took up harmonica at the age of 13. At around 16 he started playing slide-guitar. While at school in the 1970s, he wasn't into the pop music of the day. He preferred the older blues records.

=== Career ===
Lucas joined Bernie Pearl's band as a harmonica player after taking lessons from him. Some of the artists that he backed up as a harmonica player included Big Joe Turner, George "Harmonica" Smith, Pee Wee Crayton, Lowell Fulson, Eddie "Cleanhead" Vinson, and Percy Mayfield. In 1986, he formed the band Luke & The Locomotives. In 1992, he played shows in the UK in support of his AudioQuest album Built For Comfort. His backing musicians were: Rick Lacey (drums), Ian Edmundson (bass), and Gary Burnett (guitar). In 1993, he was one of the many acts scheduled to play at the Orange County Blues Festival. In 1994, he joined Canned Heat and fronted the band. He played on their 1999 album Boogie 2000. In 2000, he left for a solo career, but by 2005, he had rejoined the band.

== Death ==
Lucas died from what appeared to be a drug overdose at a friend's place in Long Beach, California. He was 46 years of age.

== Discography ==
=== With Luke And The Locomotives ===
- Luke And The Locomotives - Audioquest Music AQ-LP1004 (1991)

=== As solo artist ===
- Usin' Man Blues - AudioQuest Music AQ-LP1001 (1990)
- Built For Comfort - AudioQuest Music AQ-LP1011 (1992)
- Layaway - AudioQuest Music AQ-LP1021 (1994)
- Completely Blue - AudioQuest Music AQ-CD1045 (1997)
