= Vintage (Canned Heat album) =

Studio album by Canned Heat
- Released: 1970
- Recorded: 1966
- Studio: El Dorado Studios, Los Angeles
- Genre: Blues rock
- Length: 24:22
- Label: Janus
- Producer: Johnny Otis

Canned Heat chronology
Future Blues (1970)	Vintage (1970)	Canned Heat '70 Concert Live in Europe (1970)

Professional ratings
Review scores
Source	Rating
AllMusic	4/5 stars
The Village Voice	E

Vintage is the sixth album by American blues rock band Canned Heat. Produced by Johnny Otis, it featured the Muddy Waters/Elmore James' song "Rollin' and Tumblin'" recorded with and without Alan Wilson's harmonica leads. These sessions have surfaced on a multiple of reissues including, Don't Forget to Boogie: Vintage Heat (2002), Vintage Canned Heat (1996), Eternal Boogie, Canned Heat in Concert and various other releases.

== Chart performance ==
The album debuted on Billboard magazine's Top LP's chart in the issue dated January 17, 1970, peaking at No. 173 during a five-week run on the chart.

== Track listing ==
=== Side One ===
1. "Spoonful" (Willie Dixon) – 2:30
2. "Big Road Blues" (Tommy Johnson) – 2:08
3. "Rollin' and Tumblin'" (Muddy Waters) – 2:17 without harmonica
4. "Got My Mojo Working" (Preston Foster) – 2:44
5. "Pretty Thing" (Dixon) – 2:01

=== Side Two ===
1. "Louise" (Chester Burnett) – 3:07
2. "Dimples" (John Lee Hooker) – 2:21
3. "Can't Hold on Much Longer" (W. Jacobs) – 2:32
4. "Straight Ahead" (Canned Heat) – 2:35
5. "Rollin' and Tumblin'" (Waters) – 2:07 with (Alan Wilson on) harmonica

== Personnel ==
Canned Heat

- Bob Hite – vocals
- Alan Wilson – slide guitar, vocals, harmonica
- Henry Vestine – lead guitar
- Stuart Brotman – bass
- Frank Cook – drums

Production

- Johnny Otis – Producer- 1966- This was when the band was known as the Canned Heat Blues Band, these were demos and were the first time Canned Heat recorded in a studio, they were not released until 1970, this from page 94 of a book written by Rebecca Davis entitled Blind Owl Blues: The Mysterious Life and Death of Blues Legend Alan Wilson.

== Charts ==
Chart (1970)	Peak position
US Billboard Top LPs	173
