= Reheated =

Studio album by Canned Heat
- Released: 1988
- Recorded: July 1988
- Studio: Lyon Studios (Newport Beach, California)
- Genre: Blues rock
- Length: 49:25
- Label: SPV
- Producer: Fito de la Parra, Larry Taylor

Canned Heat chronology
| Boogie up the Country (1987) | Reheated (1988) | Burnin' Live (1991) |

Professional ratings
Review scores
| Source | Rating |
|---|---|
| AllMusic | 4/5 stars |
| The Penguin Guide to Blues Recordings | 2.5/4 stars |

Reheated is the twelfth album by American blues rock band Canned Heat, released in 1988. It features two members of the band's classic lineup, Fito de la Parra and Larry Taylor. Among the titles, "Bullfrog Blues" was originally on the B-side of the first single recorded by Canned Heat in 1967; "Built for Comfort" by Willie Dixon was popularized by Howlin' Wolf; "Take Me to the River" is an R&B/soul song which has been recorded by artists such as Al Green and Talking Heads.

"Bullfrog Blues", "Mercury Blues" and "Take Me To The River" had been part of the setlist on the previous tour, as heard on Boogie Up The Country from 1987.

== Track listing ==
Side one

1. "Looking for the Party" (R. Barroso, Jim Nash) – 3:45
2. "Drifting" (E. Boyd) – 2:47
3. "I'm Watching You" (Al Blake) – 5:18
4. "Bullfrog Blues" (Canned Heat) – 2:57
5. "Hucklebuck" (Trad. Arr. Junior Watson) – 4:45
6. "Mercury Blues" (K.C. Douglas)– 3:14

Side two

1. "Gunstreet Girl" (Tom Waits) – 3:47
2. "I Love to Rock & Roll (B. Bocage) – 2:35
3. "So Fine (Betty Jean)" (Corthen, Neill, Colbert) – 5:06
4. "Take Me to the River" (Al Green, M. Hodges) – 4:08
5. "Red Headed Woman" (Taylor, Kaplan, Mann, Innes) – 3:55
6. "Built for Comfort" (Willie Dixon) – 3:47

== Personnel ==
Canned Heat

- Fito de la Parra – drums, vocals
- Larry Taylor – bass, guitar, vocals
- James Thornbury – slide guitar, harmonica, vocals
- Junior Watson – lead guitar, vocals

Production

- Recording engineer: Marvin "The Blade" McNeil
- Mixed at Sounder Studios, Granada Hills, California
- Mastered at Digiprep Studios, Hollywood, California
- Executive producer: Wolfgang Rott
