= Barry Levenson =

American songwriter

- Born: Pittsburgh, Pennsylvania, United States
- Genres: Electric blues, Chicago blues
- Occupations: Guitarist, songwriter, singer, and record producer
- Instruments: Guitar, vocals
- Years active: Late 1970s–present
- Labels: Various including Storyville Records and Rip Cat Records
- Website: Official website

Barry Levenson is an American electric blues and Chicago blues guitarist, songwriter, singer, and record producer. In a varied career, Levenson has worked as a sideman to numerous blues musicians, toiled as a session musician, been an in-house record producer for both Kent and Storyville Records, played guitar with Canned Heat between 2006 and 2010, and released five albums in his own name. He has also authored two books which described playing methods for budding blues guitarists.

== Life and career ==
Levenson was born in Pittsburgh, Pennsylvania, United States. His affection for the blues commenced at the age of 14, and gained more inspiration later when an older friend of his played him Buddy Guy's 1968 album, A Man and the Blues. Levenson began performing in his home town's local blues scene and progressed to recording studio based work. He relocated to Boston, Massachusetts, to study arranging at the Berklee School of Music. While there he was the musical director and house guitar player at the Sugar Shack, playing predominately rhythm and blues and backing touring artists, including Millie Jackson, Wilson Pickett, and Solomon Burke. Moving again to Southern California, where he remains to this day, Levenson found work playing locally, and sometimes touring, in the backing ensembles for Big Mama Thornton, Pee Wee Crayton, Finis Tasby, Percy Mayfield, and Lowell Fulson. He noted that "I was lucky to get in on the tail end of the incredible L.A. blues scene because within a few years, most of these great artists had passed on."

However, with his constant work he injured a tendon in his left hand, and was forced to stop playing the guitar for a couple of years. After pursuing parallel careers in song writing, arranging and more production work, Levenson then acquired his first recording contract with Kent Records, when leading his own group, the Automatics. By then he also became the in-house record producer for Kent. In 1994, Levenson played the guitar on William Clarke's album, Groove Time. Levenson has also written liner notes for albums released by Nina Simone, Louis Armstrong, Junior Wells, Carmen McRae, Lee Konitz, Charlie Musselwhite, T-Bone Walker, and Muddy Waters among others. Also in 1994, Levenson released his Exciting Concepts For Blues Guitar Soloing book and CD, which gave guitar playing methodology (with both music notation and tablature) that explored the techniques found in blues soloing. In 2006, the follow-up Advanced Concepts for Blues Guitar Soloing was issued. In July 1995's issue of Billboard magazine, Levenson passed comment on a new digital audio recording process from Quad Teck, in his then-capacity as recording producer for Kent Records.

Nevertheless, promise of a recording career faltered for a number of years, before Levenson secured a solo deal with Storyville Records. His debut release, Heart to Hand (1998), was a mainly instrumental disc, although Levenson attracted the singer and harmonica player Johnny Dyer, Finis Tasby, and Mary Williams to provide the vocals on a number of tracks. A critical rather than commercial success, his disappointment was assuaged by securing production and A&R duties for the label. Levenson's recording output saw Closer to the Blues (2000) include guitar work from Jake Sampson. It helped gain him an invitation to the Blues Estafette Festival in the Netherlands. Levenson's next for Storyville, Hard Times Won (2003), earned him a Blues Music Award nomination for 'Blues Song of the Year'. His work was also incorporated in two compilation albums; Blues Guitar Heaven, and Blues for a Rainy Day.

Levenson joined Canned Heat in 2006 and stayed for four years, before returning to his solo career. In addition, he remained an in-demand session musician whose work appeared in many films, television programs and commercials. His next solo release was The Late Show in 2011. Levenson commented that "almost all the songs were cut using my 1961 Stratocaster and a few old Fender amps. I was never into effects. I'm always trying to get as much tone out of the instrument as I can with just my hands." Ten of the 15 tracks were instrumentals, with Levenson again employing the services of Mary Williams, Finis Tasby, and Johnny Dyer. Hank Van Sickle played guest bass guitar on Hard Times Won, The Late Show, and Levenson's most recent effort, The Visit. The latter was released on July 17, 2015. With his second release on Rip Cat Records, Levenson turned back the clock to acknowledge musicians that had initially inspired him to play the blues guitar.

== Discography ==
=== Albums (solo) ===
Year	Title	Record label
1998	Heart to Hand	Storyville Records
2000	Closer to the Blues	Storyville Records
2003	Hard Times Won	Storyville Records
2011	The Late Show	Rip Cat Records
2015	The Visit	Rip Cat Records

=== Albums (featured guest) ===
Year	Title	Artist	Record label
2016	Movin' On	Ilana Katz Katz	Regina Royale

== See also ==
- List of electric blues musicians
