= Hooker 'n Heat =

Studio album by John Lee Hooker & Canned Heat
- Released: January 15, 1971
- Recorded: May 1970
- Studio: Liberty Records, Los Angeles, California
- Genre: Blues
- Length: 83:40
- Label: Liberty
- Producer: Bob Hite, Skip Taylor

John Lee Hooker chronology
Get Back Home in the U.S.A. (1970)	Hooker 'n Heat (1971)	Goin' Down Highway 51 (1971)

Canned Heat chronology
Canned Heat '70 Concert Live in Europe (1970)	Hooker 'n Heat (1971)	Live at Topanga Corral (1971)

Singles from Hooker 'n Heat
- 1. "Whiskey and Wimmen" Released: May 1971

Hooker 'n Heat is a double album released by blues musician John Lee Hooker and the band Canned Heat in early 1971.

It was the first of Hooker's albums to chart, reaching number 73 on the Billboard 200 chart. Hooker plays unaccompanied on side one and "Alimonia Blues"; on the remainder of side two and "The World Today" and "I Got My Eyes on You" Hooker is accompanied by Alan Wilson on various instruments. The full band plays with Hooker on the rest of side three and all of side four.

The song "Whiskey and Wimmen" was released as a single.

== Release and reception ==
Professional ratings
Review scores
Source	Rating
AllMusic	4/5 stars
The Penguin Guide to Blues Recordings	3/4 stars
Record Collector	4/4 stars

Hooker 'n Heat was released on January 15, 1971, and has received positive reviews from critics. The Penguin Guide to Blues Recordings describes the album as “one of the few occasions when younger musicians partnered [Hooker] to wholly beneficial effect.”

== Album cover art ==
This was the last studio album to feature harmonica player, guitarist and songwriter Alan Wilson, who died of a drug overdose in September 1970. The photo of the band for the album cover was taken after Wilson's death, but his picture can be seen in a frame on the wall behind John Lee Hooker. Guitarist Henry Vestine was also missing from the photo session. The person standing in front of the window, filling in for Henry, is the band's manager, Skip Taylor. Careful examination of the photo reveals that Henry's face was later added by the art department. Although featured on the cover, vocalist Bob Hite does not sing on the album.

== Track listing ==
All songs written by John Lee Hooker except as noted.

Side one
No.	Title	Length
1.	"Messin' with the Hook"	3:23
2.	"The Feelin' Is Gone"	4:32
3.	"Send Me Your Pillow"	4:48
4.	"Sittin' Here Thinkin'"	4:07
5.	"Meet Me in the Bottom"	3:34

Side two
No.	Title	Writer(s)	Length
1.	"Alimonia Blues"		4:31
2.	"Drifter"	Charles Brown, Johnny Moore, Eddie Williams	4:57
3.	"You Talk Too Much"		3:16
4.	"Burning Hell"	John Lee Hooker, Bernard Besman	5:28
5.	"Bottle Up and Go"	Tommy McClennan	2:27

Side three
No.	Title	Length
1.	"The World Today"	7:47
2.	"I Got My Eyes on You"	4:26
3.	"Whiskey and Wimmen"	4:37
4.	"Just You and Me"	7:42

Side four
No.	Title	Writer(s)	Length
1.	"Let's Make It"		4:06
2.	"Peavine"		5:07
3.	"Boogie Chillen' No. 2"	John Lee Hooker, Bernard Besman	11:33

== Charts ==
Chart (1971)	Peak position
Australian (Kent Music Report)	24
US Billboard 200	73

== Personnel ==
- John Lee Hooker - vocals, guitars

Canned Heat

- Alan Wilson - harmonica; piano on "Bottle Up and Go" and "The World Today"; rhythm guitar on "I Got My Eyes on You" and "Peavine"
- Henry Vestine - electric guitar on "Whiskey and Wimmen," "Just You and Me," "Let's Make It," and "Boogie Chillen' No. 2"
- Antonio de la Barreda - bass
- Adolfo de la Parra - drums
- Bob Hite - producer
