= Bob Hite =

American musician (1943–1981)

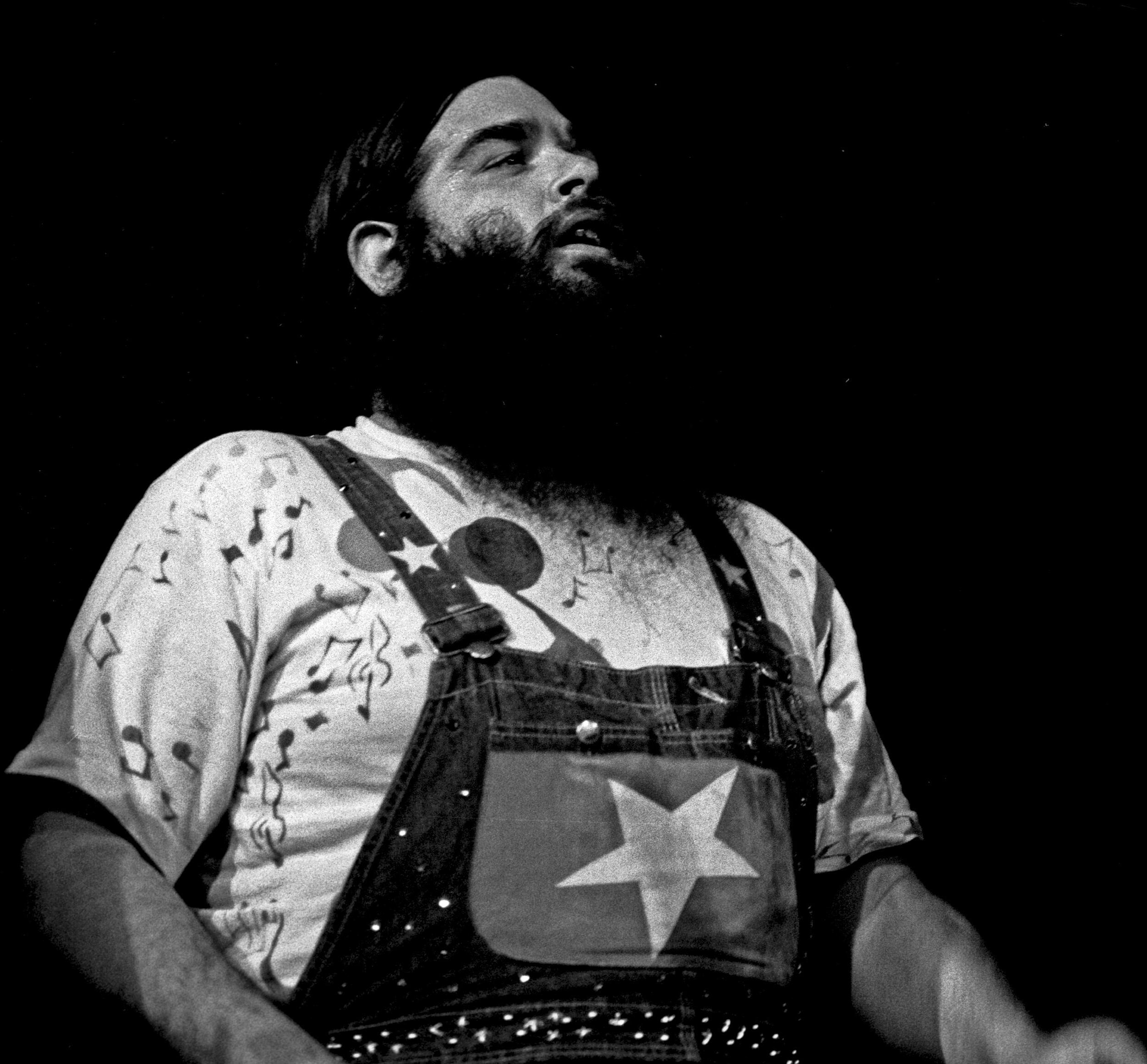
- Hite in 1974

Background information
- Also known as: The Bear
- Born: Robert Ernest Hite; February 26, 1943; Torrance, California, U.S.
- Died: April 5, 1981 (aged 38) Los Angeles, California, U.S.
- Genre: Blues rock
- Occupations: Musician; singer; songwriter; record producer
- Instruments: Vocals; harmonica; guitar; bass
- Years active: 1965–1981
- Formerly of: Canned Heat
- Website: bobhite.net

Robert Ernest Hite (February 26, 1943 – April 5, 1981), also known as "The Bear", was an American singer-songwriter, musician, and record producer who was the co-lead vocalist of the blues rock band Canned Heat from 1965 until his death in 1981.

== Canned Heat ==
Hite was introduced to guitarist and vocalist Alan Wilson by guitarist Henry Vestine and the two of them helped convince blues pianist Sunnyland Slim (1906–1995) to record new material. In 1965, Hite formed a band with Wilson and Vestine, forming the core of Canned Heat. They were eventually joined by Larry Taylor (bass) and Frank Cook (drums), with Adolfo de la Parra replacing Cook in 1967, finalising the band's first classic lineup. Hite primarily served as the band's co-lead vocalist, but occasionally played harmonica, guitar and bass with the band.

Hite performed with Canned Heat at Monterey in June 1967 and Woodstock in August 1969. The performances were not included in the original (1970) film Woodstock, but are in the 1994 director's cut version. Hite also produced the John Lee Hooker and Canned Heat album Hooker 'N Heat (1971).

== Personal life ==
Robert Hite Jr was born to Robert Ernest Hite Sr. & Anna Elizabeth Carson on February 26, 1943. According to 1950 census records, his childhood home was located at 5152 Zakon Road in Torrance, CA 90505. Hite was an avid record collector, and on an episode of Playboy After Dark, revealed that he had over 15,000 78s.

== Death ==
On April 5, 1981, during a break between sets at The Palomino Club in North Hollywood, Hite was handed a vial of heroin by a fan. He snorted it and fell into a coma, after which others unsuccessfully attempted to revive him with a large dose of cocaine. A group of roadies lifted Hite and placed him inside a van, where he died en route to the home of bandmate Adolfo de la Parra. Hite was 38 years old.
