= Adolfo de la Parra =

Mexican blues rock drummer (born 1946)

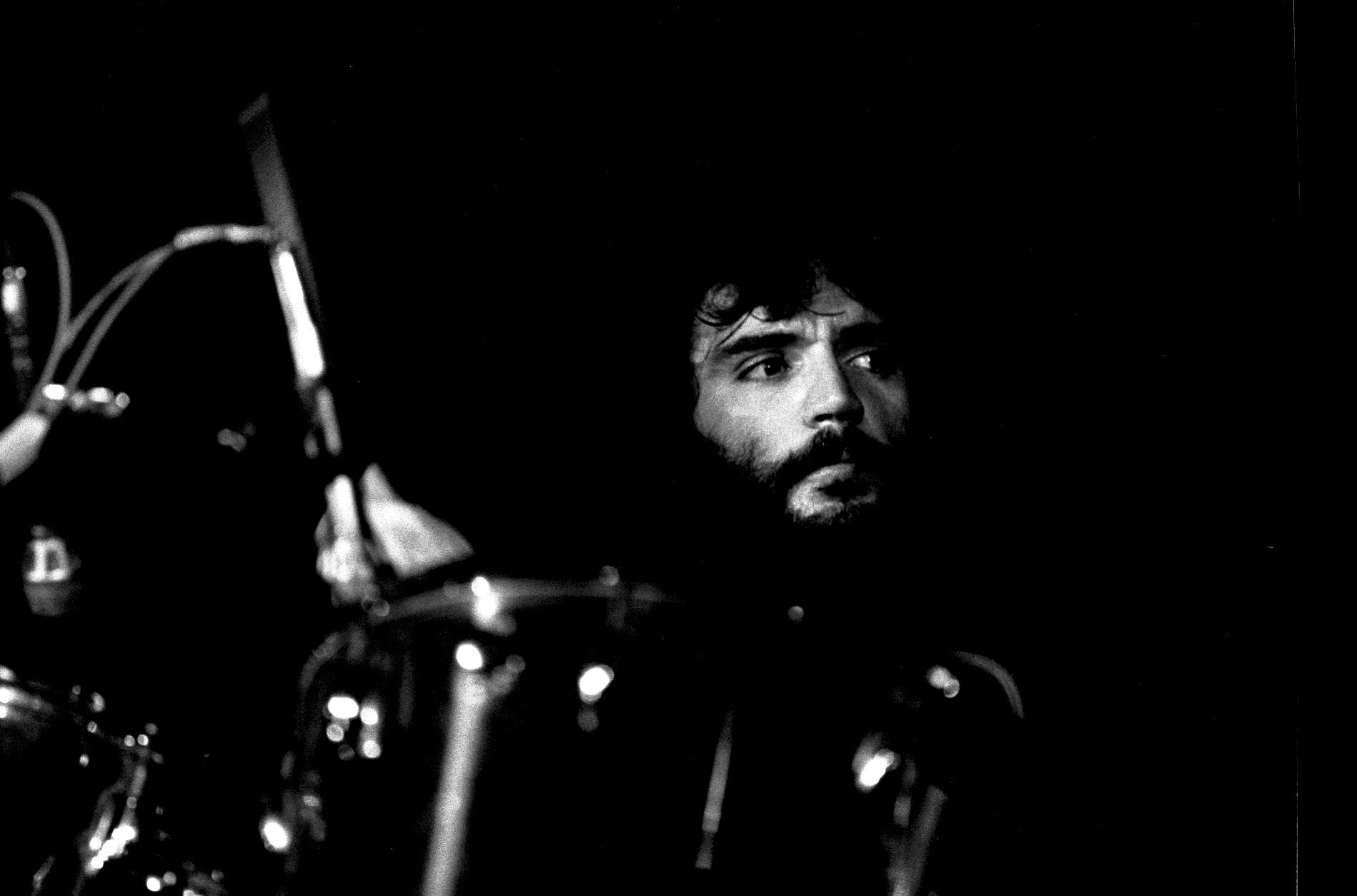
- Parra in Hamburg, March 1974

Background information
- Born: February 8, 1946 (age 80); Mexico City, Mexico
- Genres: Blues rock
- Occupations: Musician, author
- Instrument: Drums
- Years active: 1967–present
- Member of: Canned Heat
- Formerly of: Los Sinners; Bluesberry Jam

Adolfo "Fito" de la Parra (born 8 February 1946) is a Mexican musician, best known as the drummer for the American blues rock band Canned Heat.

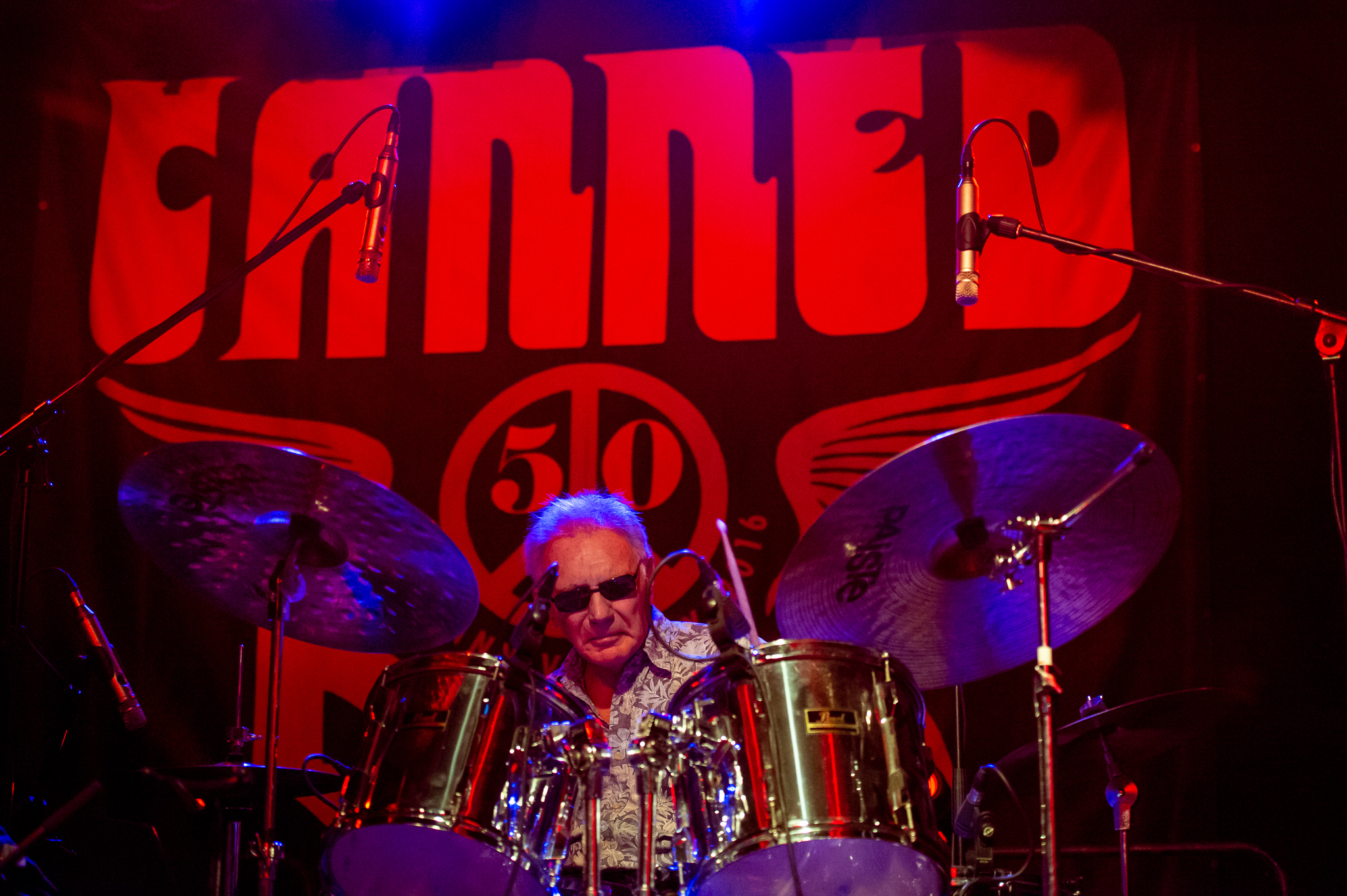
Adolfo "Fito" de la Parra on stage with Canned Heat in 2018

== Early life and career ==
Parra was born in Mexico City and played in bands such as Los Sinners and Los Hooligans. After moving to the United States, he joined The Sotweed Factor before leaving to play with Bluesberry Jam.

In 1967, while playing with Bluesberry Jam, Parra was discovered by the members of Canned Heat. He was invited to join the band, replacing drummer Frank Cook, who in turn replaced Parra in Bluesberry Jam—a switch described by the bands as a "simple switch over." Parra's first performance with Canned Heat was on December 1, 1967. He later performed with the band at Woodstock in 1969. Parra was given the nickname "Fito," the only non-animal-related moniker among the band members.

Following the death of Larry Taylor in 2019, Parra is the only surviving principal member from the 1960s lineup.

In addition to his work with Canned Heat, Parra has performed with blues artists such as The Coasters, T-Bone Walker, Ben E. King, Mary Wells, Etta James, and The Platters. He produced and appeared in the 2007 film Rock 'n Roll Made in Mexico: From Evolution to Revolution and authored the 2010 book Living the Blues.

== Publications ==
- De La Parra, Fito (2010). Living the Blues: Canned Heat's Story of Music, Drugs, Death, Sex and Survival. Canned Heat Music. p. 412. ISBN 9780967644905.

== See also ==
List of performances and events at Woodstock Festival
