= Let's Work Together: The Best of Canned Heat =

Compilation album by Canned Heat
- Released: 1989
- Genre: Blues rock
- Label: Liberty/EMI

Professional ratings
Review scores
Source	Rating
The Penguin Guide to Blues Recordings	3/4 stars

Let's Work Together: The Best of Canned Heat is a compilation album by American blues rock band Canned Heat, released in 1989. All of the songs are taken from the first five albums released on Liberty Records between 1966 and 1970, except for "Rockin' with the King", which is from the United Artists Records album Historical Figures and Ancient Heads (1971).

Various reissues on compact disc include extra tracks. The compilation was superseded in 1994 by the two CD set Uncanned! The Best of Canned Heat on Liberty/EMI Records.

In 2001, a three CD set with the same title was released in Europe with gray market/bootleg recordings of early demos and live material.

== Track listing ==
Side one

1. "On the Road Again" – 3:25
2. "Bullfrog Blues" – 2:17
3. "Rollin' and Tumblin'" – 3:06
4. "Amphetamine Annie" – 3:31
5. "Fried Hockey Boogie" – 11:05
6. "Sic 'em Pigs" – 2:35
7. "Poor Moon" – 2:40

Side two

1. "Let's Work Together" – 2:48
2. "Going Up the Country" – 2:50
3. "Boogie Music" – 2:59
4. "Same All Over" – 2:48
5. "Time Was" – 3:19
6. "Sugar Bee" – 2:37
7. "Rockin' with the King" – 3:16
8. "That's Alright Mama" – 4:16
9. "My Time Ain't Long" – 3:47

== Track listing on CD edition ==
1. On the Road Again – 3:26
2. Bullfrog Blues – 2:17
3. Rollin' and Tumblin' – 3:06
4. Amphetamine Annie – 3:31
5. Fried Hockey Boogie – 11:06
6. Sic 'em Pigs – 2:35
7. Poor Moon – 2:41
8. Let's Work Together – 2:48
9. Going Up the Country – 2:50
10. Boogie Music – 2:59
11. Same All Over – 2:48
12. Time Was – 3:20
13. Sugar Bee – 2:37
14. Rockin' with the King – 3:16
15. That's Alright Mama – 4:16
16. My Time Ain't Long – 3:48
17. Future Blues – 2:58
18. Pony Blues – 3:49
19. So Sad (The World's in a Tangle) – 7:55
20. The Chipmunk Song – 2:48 [The Chipmunks with Canned Heat]

== Personnel ==
- Bob Hite – lead vocals
- Alan Wilson – rhythm and slide guitar, harmonica, vocals
- Henry Vestine – lead guitar
- Larry Taylor – bass guitar
- Adolfo de la Parra – drums
- Frank Cook – drums on tracks without de la Parra
- Harvey Mandel – lead guitar on tracks without Vestine
- Antonio de la Barreda – bass on "Rockin' With the King"
- Little Richard – piano, vocals on "Rockin' With the King"
- Clifford Solomon – saxophone on "Rockin' With the King"
