= Uncanned! The Best of Canned Heat =

Compilation album by Canned Heat
- Released: May 17, 1994
- Recorded: April 17, 1967 – November 28, 1972
- Genre: Blues rock
- Length: 2:31:44
- Label: EMI
- Producer: Various

Canned Heat chronology
Let's Work Together: The Best of Canned Heat (1989)	Uncanned! The Best of Canned Heat (1994)	Best of Hooker 'n' Heat (1996)

Professional ratings
Review scores
Source	Rating
AllMusic	4.5/5 stars
The Penguin Guide to Blues Recordings	3.5/4 stars

Uncanned! The Best of Canned Heat is a two-disc CD set by American blues rock band Canned Heat issued in 1994 that features various tracks from previous albums and some previously unreleased tracks. Highlights include an alternate, longer take of "On the Road Again", and the first release of "Let's Work Together" in stereo.

== Track listing ==
=== Disc one ===
1. "On the Road Again" (Alternate Take) (Floyd Jones, Alan Wilson) – 7:05 °
2. "Nine Below Zero" (Sonny Boy Williamson II) – 4:08 °
3. "TV Mama" (Lou Willie Turner) – 6:21 °
4. "Rollin' and Tumblin'" (McKinley Morganfield) – 3:05
5. "Bullfrog Blues" (Hite Jr., Wilson, Taylor, Vestine, Cook) – 2:17
6. "Evil Is Going On" (Willie Dixon) – 2:20
7. "Goin' Down Slow" (St. Louis Jimmy Oden) – 3:43
8. "Dust My Broom" (Robert Johnson, Elmore James) – 3:14
9. "Help Me" (Sonny Boy Williamson II, R. Bass) – 3:07
10. "The Story of My Life" (E. Jones) – 3:38
11. "The Hunter" (Steve Cropper, Donald "Duck" Dunn, Al Jackson Jr., Booker T. Jones, Carl Wells) – 3:37 °
12. "Whiskey and Wimmen'" (John Lee Hooker) – 3:59 °
13. "Shake, Rattle and Roll" (Charles Calhoun) – 2:42 °
14. "Mean Old World" (Walter Jacobs) – 3:26 °
15. "Fannie Mae" (Brown, Robinson, Lewis) – 3:06 °
16. "Gotta Boogie (The World Boogie)" (Canned Heat) – 9:55 °
17. "My Crime" (Canned Heat) – 3:57
18. "On the Road Again" (Floyd Jones, Alan Wilson) – 4:59

=== Disc two ===
1. "Evil Woman" (Larry Weiss) – 2:59
2. "Amphetamine Annie" (Canned Heat) – 3:56
3. "An Owl Song" (Alan Wilson) – 2:43
4. "Terraplane Blues" (Robert Johnson) – 3:21 °
5. "Christmas Blues (Alternate Take)" (De La Parra, Vestine, Wilson, Hite Jr.) – 7:34 ∞ °
6. "Going Up the Country" (Alan Wilson) – 2:50
7. "Time Was" (Alan Wilson) – 3:36
8. "Low Down (And High Up)" (Hite Jr., Wilson, Vestine, Taylor, De La Parra) – 2:50
9. "Same All Over" (Canned Heat) – 2:49
10. "Big Fat (The Fat Man)" (Fats Domino, Dave Bartholomew, adapted by Robert Hite Jr.) – 1:58
11. "It's All Right" (John Lee Hooker) – 5:35 ∞ ∞ °
12. "Poor Moon" (Alan Wilson) – 3:24
13. "Sugar Bee" (Eddie Shuler) – 2:36
14. "Shake It and Break It" (Alan Wilson) – 2:31
15. "Future Blues" (Hite Jr., Wilson, Mandel, Taylor, De La Parra) – 2:58
16. "Let's Work Together (Let's Stick Together)" (Wilbert Harrison) – 3:11
17. "Wooly Bully" (Domingo Samudio) – 2:30
18. "Human Condition" (Canned Heat) – 5:24 °
19. "Long Way from L.A." (Jud Baker) – 3:04
20. "Hill's Stomp" (Joel Scott Hill) – 3:01
21. "Rockin' with the King" (Skip Taylor, Richard Wayne Penniman) – 3:15 ∞ ∞ ∞
22. "Harley Davidson Blues" (James Shane) – 2:33
23. "Rock & Roll Music" (Richard J. Hite Jr.) – 2:27

∞ featuring Dr. John
∞ ∞ Canned Heat and John Lee Hooker
∞ ∞ ∞ featuring Little Richard
° previously unreleased
