= Future Blues (Canned Heat album) =

- Cover of the original 1970 LP

Studio album by Canned Heat
- Released: August 3, 1970
- Recorded: 1970
- Studio: Village Recorders, Los Angeles
- Genre: Blues rock; psychedelic rock
- Length: 35:25
- Label: Liberty
- Producer: Skip Taylor, Canned Heat

Canned Heat chronology
Hallelujah (1969)	Future Blues (1970)	Vintage (1970)

Professional ratings
Review scores
Source	Rating
AllMusic	4.5/5 stars
Christgau's Record Guide	A−
The Village Voice	A

Future Blues is the fifth album by American blues rock band Canned Heat, released in 1970. It was the last to feature the band's classic lineup, as Larry Taylor and Harvey Mandel had both departed by July 1970, prior to its release to record with John Mayall and songwriter Alan Wilson died shortly after on September 3, 1970. It was also the only classic-era Canned Heat studio album to feature Mandel, as Henry Vestine had been the lead guitarist on the previous albums. Their cover of "Let's Work Together" by Wilbert Harrison became a hit. "London Blues" features Dr. John. It was re-released on CD in 2002 by MAM productions with five bonus tracks.

== Chart performance ==
The album debuted on Billboard magazine's Top LP's chart in the issue dated September 12, 1970, and peaked at No. 59 on October 17, 1970.

== Track listing ==
=== Side one ===
1. "Sugar Bee" (Eddie Shuler) – 2:39
2. "Shake It and Break It" (Charlie Patton) – 2:35
3. "That's All Right (Mama)" (Arthur "Big Boy" Crudup) – 4:19
4. "My Time Ain't Long" (Alan Wilson) – 3:49
5. "Skat" (Wilson) – 2:44
6. "Let's Work Together" (Wilbert Harrison) – 2:53

=== Side two ===
1. "London Blues" (Wilson) – 5:31
2. "So Sad (The World's in a Tangle)" (Canned Heat) – 7:57
3. "Future Blues" (Canned Heat) – 2:58

=== Bonus tracks from 2000 CD release (Repertoire REP 4889) ===
1. "Let's Work Together" Single Mono Version (Harrison) – 2:46
2. "Skat" Single Mono Version (Wilson) – 2:39
3. "Wooly Bully" (Sam Samudio) – 2:30
4. "Christmas Blues" Canned Heat and The Chipmunks (Cook, Taylor, Vestine, Wilson, Hite Jr.) – 2:31
5. "The Chipmunk Song (Christmas Don't Be Late)" Canned Heat and The Chipmunks (Ross Bagdasarian) – 2:45

== Personnel ==
=== Canned Heat ===
- Bob Hite – vocals
- Alan Wilson – slide guitar, vocals, harmonica
- Harvey Mandel – lead guitar
- Larry Taylor – bass
- Adolfo de la Parra – drums

=== Additional musicians ===
- Dr. John – piano, horn arrangements (tracks 5 & 7)
- Ernest Lane – piano (track 9)

=== Technical ===
- Skip Taylor – producer
- Canned Heat – producer
- Tommy Oliver – engineer
