= Canned Heat (disambiguation) =

Canned Heat was an American blues rock band.

Canned Heat may also refer to:

- Sterno Canned Heat, fuel made from denatured and jellied alcohol, designed to be burned directly from its can
- "Canned Heat Blues", a 1928 song by Tommy Johnson on the drinking of alcohol from Sterno Canned Heat
- Canned Heat (album), Canned Heat's 1967 debut album
- "Canned Heat", a song on Canned Heat's 1969 Hallelujah album
- "Canned Heat" (song), a 1999 single by Jamiroquai
- Canned heat, a professional wrestling phrase for playing recorded crowd reactions through an arena sound system
- Fiocchi Munizioni Canned Heat ammunition, sealed in metal cans enhancing shelf life
