= On the Road Again (Canned Heat song) =

Single by Canned Heat

from the album Boogie with Canned Heat
- B-side: "Boogie Music"
- Released: April 24, 1968
- Recorded: September 6, 1967
- Studio: Liberty, Los Angeles
- Genre: Blues rock (Note: "On the Road Again, Canned Heat: This song ... is psychedelic blues rock that benefits from studio overdubbing technology."); psychedelic rock; drone
- Length: 4:55 (album version); 3:33 (single version)
- Label: Liberty
- Songwriters: Floyd Jones; Alan Wilson
- Producer: Cal Carter

Canned Heat singles chronology
"Evil Woman" (1967)	"On the Road Again" (1968)	"Going Up the Country" (1968)

Official audio
- "On The Road Again" (Remastered 2005) on YouTube

"On the Road Again" is a song recorded by the American blues rock group Canned Heat in 1967. A driving blues rock boogie, it was adapted from earlier blues songs and includes mid-1960s psychedelic rock elements. Unlike most of Canned Heat's songs from the period which were sung by Bob Hite, second guitarist and harmonica player Alan Wilson provides the distinctive high-pitched vocal, sometimes described as a falsetto.

"On the Road Again" first appeared on their second album, Boogie with Canned Heat, in January 1968. An edited version was released as a single in April 1968 on the Liberty label and became Canned Heat's first record chart hit and one of their best-known songs.

== Earlier songs ==
"On the Road Again" is based on early blues songs by Tommy Johnson and Floyd Jones. The lyrics to Johnson's "Big Road Blues" (1928) include: "Well, I ain't goin' down that big road by myself ... If I don't carry you, gonna carry somebody else". In "Dark Road" (1951), Jones "reshaped Tommy Johnson's verses into an eerie evocation of the Delta":

Whoaa, well, my mother died and left me
Ohh, when I was quite young, when I was quite young ...
Said, Lord have mercy, ooo, on my wicked son

Jones later remade "Dark Road" with the title "On the Road Again" and added:

Whoaa, I had to travel, whoaa, in the rain and snow, in the rain and snow
My baby had quit me, ooo (2×)
Have no place to go

Both songs share a "hypnotic one-chord drone piece"-arrangement that one-time Floyd Jones musical partner Howlin' Wolf used for his songs "Crying at Daybreak" and the related "Smokestack Lightning".

== Recording and composition ==
"On the Road Again" was among the first songs Canned Heat recorded as demos in April 1967 at the RCA Studios in Chicago with original drummer Frank Cook. At over seven minutes in length, it has the basic elements of the later album version, but is two minutes longer with more harmonica and guitar soloing. (Note: Bob Hite prefaces the recording with "OK ... light and greasy, don't let it go down".)

During the recording for their second album, Canned Heat recorded "On the Road Again" with new drummer Adolfo "Fito" de la Parra. The session took place September 6, 1967, at the Liberty Records studio in Los Angeles. Alan Wilson used verses from Floyd Jones' "On the Road Again" and "Dark Road" and added some lines of his own:

Well, I'm so tired of cryin', but I'm out on the road again, I'm on the road again (2×)
I ain't got no woman just to call my special friend

For the instrumental accompaniment, Canned Heat uses a "basic E/G/A blues chord pattern" or "one-chord boogie riff" adapted from John Lee Hooker's 1949 hit "Boogie Chillen'". Expanding on Jones' hypnotic drone, Wilson used an Eastern string instrument called a tambura to give the song a psychedelic ambience. Although Bob Hite was the group's primary vocalist, "On the Road" features Wilson as the singer, "utilizing his best Skip James-inspired falsetto vocal". (Note: Author Charles Shaar Murray described Wilson's vocal style as "reminiscent of Skip James at his most ectoplasmic".) Wilson also provides the harmonica parts. (Note: Wilson's harmonica solo has a note that is not playable without an overblow; he re-tuned his harmonica's six hole up a half step.)

== Personnel ==
- Alan Wilson – vocal, harmonica, electric guitar, tambura
- Henry Vestine – electric guitar
- Larry Taylor – bass guitar
- Adolfo de la Parra – drums

== Releases and charts ==
"On the Road Again" is included on Canned Heat's second album, Boogie with Canned Heat, released January 21, 1968, by Liberty Records. After receiving strong response from airplay on American "underground" FM radio, Liberty issued the song as a single on April 24, 1968. To make the song more Top-40 AM radio-friendly, Liberty edited it from the original length of 4:55 to a 3:33 single version. It became Canned Heat's first single to appear in the record charts. (Note: Canned Heat's first single, "Rollin' and Tumblin'", appeared in Billboard's Bubbling Under Hot 100 Singles chart at number 115 in July 1967.)

Chart (1968–1969)	Peak position
Australia Go-Set Top 40	9
Belgium (Ultratop 50 Flanders)	5
Canada RPM Top Singles	8
France (SNEP)	7
Ireland (Irish Singles Chart)	14
Netherlands (Dutch Top 40)	5
Netherlands (Single Top 100)	3
New Zealand (Listener)	5
Switzerland (Schweizer Hitparade)	3
U.K. (Official Singles Chart)	8
U.S. (Billboard Hot 100)	16
West Germany (GfK)	13

On the singles, Floyd Jones and Alan Wilson are listed as the composers, while the album credits Jim Oden/James Burke Oden (also known as St. Louis Jimmy Oden). (Note: St. Louis Jimmy Oden was a part-owner of J.O.B. Records, the label that issued Floyd Jones' singles.) "On the Road Again" appears on several Canned Heat compilation albums, including Let's Work Together: The Best of Canned Heat (1989) and Uncanned! The Best of Canned Heat (1994).

== Influence ==
Although songs inspired by John Lee Hooker's "Detroit-era boogie" had been recorded over the years by a variety of blues musicians, Canned Heat's "On the Road Again" popularized the guitar-boogie or E/G/A riff in the rock world. As a result, "it's been a standard rock and roll pattern ever since". Canned Heat used it frequently as the starting point for several of their extended jam songs, including the 40 minute live opus "Refried Boogie (Part I & II)" from their late 1968 Living the Blues album. When Hooker recorded an updated version of "Boogie Chillen'", titled "Boogie Chillen No. 2", with the group in 1970 for Hooker 'n Heat, it had come full circle.

The song was covered by the French space rock band Rockets in 1978.

== Sources ==
- Burke, Patrick (2021). Tear Down the Walls: White Radicalism and Black Power in 1960s Rock. University of Chicago Press. ISBN 978-0226768359.
- Evans, David (2005). The NPR Curious Listener's Guide to Blues. Penguin. ISBN 978-0-399-53072-2.
- Gioia, Ted (2008). Delta Blues. W. W. Norton. ISBN 978-0-393-33750-1.
- Koda, Cub (1996). Erlewine, Michael (ed.). All Music Guide to the Blues. Miller Freeman Books. ISBN 0-87930-424-3.
- Murray, Charles Shaar (2002). Boogie Man: The Adventures of John Lee Hooker in the American Twentieth Century. Macmillan. ISBN 978-0-312-27006-3.
- Palmer, Robert (1981). Deep Blues. Penguin Books. ISBN 0-14-006223-8.
- Rowe, Mike (1991). Blues Is Killing Me (Album notes). Various artists. Paula Records. PCD-19.
- Russo, Greg (1994). Uncanned! The Best of Canned Heat (CD compilation booklet). Canned Heat. EMI/Liberty. 7243 8 29165 2 9.
