= The Stuff That Dreams Are Made Of (album) =

Compilation album by various artists
- Released: April 2006
- Recorded: 1920s and 1930s
- Genre: Blues, country, old-time
- Length: 141:13
- Label: Yazoo
- Producer: Richard Nevins

The Stuff That Dreams Are Made Of is a two-CD album of blues, country, and old-time music recordings that were originally released in the 1920s and 1930s on 78 rpm records. Subtitled The Dead Sea Scrolls of Record Collecting, it is a compilation of songs from rare and hard-to-find records. It was released in 2006.

The cover of The Stuff That Dreams Are Made Of is the size and shape of a DVD box. The cover art is by Robert Crumb, a noted cartoonist and an avid collector of vintage 78 rpm records. The album also includes a 20-page illustrated booklet.

According to the liner notes, the album was remastered using only a moderate level of noise reduction, with the goal of preserving as much as possible of the character and dynamic range of the original recordings. As a result, some of the songs exhibit a considerable amount of noise due to surface wear and damaged grooves on the shellac phonograph records.

== Critical reception ==
On AllMusic Ronnie D. Lankford Jr. said, "...[T]his two-disc collection – all 46 cuts – is a testament to rarities.... But even for those who might not understand why they should be excited by The Stuff That Dreams Are Made Of, the collection nonetheless holds up as good old-time folk and blues, and expense-wise, Yazoo always offers lots of quality music for one's money."

In JazzTimes Christopher Porter wrote, "The cuts here are culled from test or personal pressings and last-existing-copies, making the collection a Holy Grail One Stop for fans of "American primitive" music by the likes of the Georgia Pot Lickers, Wilmer Watts and Son House (whose "Clarksdale Moan" alone is worth the price of admission). The set's sound quality is mostly fine considering the sources..."

In The Tuscaloosa News Ben Windham wrote, "The weird thing is, if the set is pitched to collectors, is the complete absence of the kind of nerdy discographical information that they feed on – recording dates, personnel lists, matrix numbers, even the labels on which the originals were issued.... This landmark collection, which brings all these recordings and dozens more together, is a tremendous artifact."

On Old Time Party Mike Yates said, "... [W]hilst a number of items are heard here on CD for the first time, it must be said that some tracks have been reissued previously elsewhere.... So, a superb collection of goodies that will send shivers down the spines of both blues and old-timey enthusiasts.... [J]ust let this double collection of musical gems flow through your veins."

== Track listing ==
Disc 1

1. "Croquet Habits" – Freeny's Barn Dance Band
2. "Mississippi County Farm Blues" – Son House
3. "Up Jumped the Rabbit" – Georgia Pot Lickers
4. "I'm Going Back Home" – Memphis Minnie & Joe McCoy
5. "Fightin' in the War with Spain" – Wilmer Watts and the Lonely Eagles
6. "Old Timbrook Blues" – John Byrd
7. "A Little Talk with Jesus" – Ernest Phipps and His Holiness Singers
8. "Slidin' Delta" – Tommy Johnson
9. "Alabama Blues" – The Three Stripped Gears
10. "Rollin' Dough Blues" – Jack Gowdlock
11. "Ginseng Blues" – Kentucky Ramblers
12. "Police and High Sheriff Come Ridin' Down" – Ollis Martin
13. "John Hardy Blues" – John Harvey & Jess Johnston and the West Virginia Ramblers
14. "Original Stack O'Lee Blues" – Long "Cleeve" Reed & Little Harvey Hull
15. "Two Step de la Prairie Soileau" – Amédé Ardoin & Dennis McGee
16. "Operator Blues" – Andrew and Jim Baxter
17. "The Grey Eagle" – J.D. Harris
18. "Jim Strainer Blues" – Memphis Jug Band
19. "Ain't That Trouble in Mind" – Grayson County Railsplitters
20. "Old Rub Alcohol Blues" – Dock Boggs
21. "Mistreatin' Mama" – Jaybird Coleman
22. "It's a Rough Road to Georgia" – Henry Whitter
23. "Live the Life" – Rev. B.L. Wightman with Lottie Kimbrough & congregation

Disc 2

1. "Sweet Mama" – Yank Rachell with Sleepy John Estes & Jab Jones
2. "We All Love Mother" – Crowder Brothers
3. "Clarksdale Moan" – Son House
4. "Bulldog Sal" – Ashley & Foster
5. "Down in Texas Blues" – Jesse "Babyface" Thomas
6. "Chicken Don't Roost Too High" – Georgia Pot Lickers
7. "I'm Leavin' Town (But I Sho' Don't Wanna Go)" – William Harris
8. "Wild Cat Rag" – Asa Martin & Roy Hobbs
9. "Whoopee Blues" – King Solomon Hill
10. "Davey Crockett" – Chubby Parker
11. "Skinny Leg Blues" – Geeshie Wiley
12. "I'm Gonna Marry That Pretty Little Girl" – Sweet Brothers
13. "I Shall Not Be Moved" – Blind Roosevelt Graves & Uaroy Graves
14. "Lonesome Road Blues" – Smith & Irvine
15. "If I Call You Mama" – Luke Jordan
16. "My Mind Is to Marry" – Grayson & Whitter
17. "Green River" – Osey Helton
18. "Don't Speak to Me" – Lottie Kimbrough
19. "Married Man's Blues" – Wade Ward
20. "Sweet Betsy from Pike" – Ken Maynard
21. "Boll Weevil" – Jaybird Coleman
22. "Bound Steel Blues" – Bill Shepherd with Hayes Shepherd & Ed Webb
23. "Bells of Love" – Middle Georgia Singing Convention No. 1

== Personnel ==
- Richard Nevins – producer, mastering, liner notes
- Robert Crumb – cover art
- Lorien Babajian – package and booklet design
