= I Shall Not Be Moved =

Song

"I Shall Not Be Moved" (Roud 9134), also known as "We Shall Not Be Moved", is an African-American spiritual, hymn, and protest song dating to the early 19th century American south. It was likely originally sung at revivalist camp-meetings as a slave jubilee. The song describes being "like a tree planted by the waters" who "shall not be moved" because of faith in God. Secularly, as "We Shall Not Be Moved" it gained popularity as a labor union song and a protest song of the Civil Rights Movement.

The text is based on biblical scripture:

Blessed is the man that trusteth in the LORD, and whose hope the LORD is. For he shall be as a tree planted by the waters, and that spreadeth out her roots by the river, and shall not see when heat cometh, but her leaf shall be green; and shall not be careful in the year of drought, neither shall cease from yielding fruit.

— Jeremiah 17:7–8

And he shall be like a tree planted by the rivers of water, that bringeth forth his fruit in his season; his leaf also shall not wither; and whatsoever he doeth shall prosper.

— Psalm 1:3

He only is my rock and my salvation: he is my defence; I shall not be moved.

— Psalm 62:6

In 1908 Alfred H. and B. D. Ackley copyrighted a hymn by the name "I Shall Not Be Moved".

In June 2026, CBS News included the song in its list of the 250 essential American songs of the past 250 years.

== Civil rights and labor protest song ==
As "We Shall Not Be Moved", the song was widely sung by groups of civil rights activists and others during the 1960s. It was especially favored during tense confrontations between non-violent protesters and local police or sheriffs.

One other notable use of the song came when college students staged a sit-down protest during a hearing of the House Un-American Activities Committee at San Francisco City Hall in May 1960.

The song became popular in the Swedish anti-nuclear and peace movements in the late 1970s, in a Swedish translation by Roland von Malmborg, "Aldrig ger vi upp" ('Never shall we give up').

== Recorded versions ==
Anti-ICE protesters sing We Shall Not Be Moved inside a kettle during the 2026 Delaney Hall protests

Among others, the following artists recorded "I (We) Shall Not Be Moved":

- Blind Roosevelt Graves (1929) – reissued on The Stuff That Dreams Are Made Of (2006)
- Charley Patton (1929)
- The Almanac Singers with Pete Seeger on The Original Talking Union and Other Union Songs (1955)
- The Harmonizing Four (single; Gotham 1954)
- Lonnie Donegan on Lonnie Donegan Showcase (1956)
- The Million Dollar Quartet (Elvis Presley, Jerry Lee Lewis, Carl Perkins, and Johnny Cash) (1956)
- The Freedom Singers at the March on Washington (1963) in a medley with other songs
- Mississippi John Hurt on The Best Of Mississippi John Hurt (recorded 1965, published 1970)
- Ella Fitzgerald on Brighten the Corner (1967)
- Oktoberklub on Der Oktober-Klub singt (1967)
- Xesco Boix on No Serem moguts! (We shall not be moved!) (1967) a Catalan version of the protest song quite popular on that time by Viasona.
- The Seekers, on several albums including The Best of The Seekers (1968)
- Son House on The Real Delta Blues – 14 songs from the man who taught Robert Johnson (recorded 1960, published 1974)
- Joan Baez ("No Nos Moverán") on her Spanish-language album Gracias a la Vida (1974)
- Henry Qualls on Blues from Elmo, Texas (1994)
- Underground Ministries featuring Kenny Bobien (Vinyl, 12", Single, Promo) (1999)
- Sweet Honey in the Rock on Still the Same Me (2000)
- This Bike Is a Pipe Bomb on Front Seat Solidarity (2002)
- Peter, Paul and Mary on In These Times (2003)
- Johnny Cash on My Mother's Hymn Book (2004)
- Mavis Staples on We'll Never Turn Back (2007)
- Public Enemy on Most of My Heroes Still Don't Appear on No Stamp (2012)
- Owen McDonagh & The Bogside Men on Songs of Irish Civil Rights (1970)
- Rhiannon Giddens on They're Calling Me Home (2021)
- Taj Mahal and Ry Cooder on GET ON BOARD

The Housemartins on the 12 inch version of their 1985 UK number 1 single "Caravan of Love"

== In popular culture ==
David Spener has written a book documenting the history of this song title, including how it was translated into Spanish, changing the first singular to third person plural, "No Nos Moverán" (meaning "They will not move us"). That version was part of the soundtrack of the well-known popular TV series Verano azul, which popularized the song among the Spanish youth.

== See also ==
- Civil rights movement in popular culture
- Christian child's prayer § Spirituals
