= Future Blues =

Future Blues may refer to:

- Future Blues (Cowboy Bebop album)
- Future Blues (Canned Heat album), 1970
- Future Blues, a song by Canned Heat on the album Future Blues, 1970
