= Let's Stick Together (song) =

1962 single by Wilbert Harrison

Single by Wilbert Harrison
- A-side: "Kansas City Twist" (1st issue)
- B-side: "My Heart Is Yours" (2nd issue)
- Released: 1962
- Recorded: 1962
- Genre: Rhythm and blues
- Length: 2:55
- Label: Fury
- Songwriter: Wilbert Harrison
- Producer: Bobby Robinson

"Let's Stick Together" is a blues-based rhythm and blues song written by American singer Wilbert Harrison. In 1962, Fury Records released it as a single. Harrison further developed the song and in 1969, Sue Records issued it as a two-part single titled "Let's Work Together". Although Harrison's original song did not appear in the record charts, his reworked version entered the U.S. top 40.

Several artists subsequently recorded the songs; "Let's Work Together" by Canned Heat (1970) and "Let's Stick Together" by Bryan Ferry (1976) were both chart successes.

== Original songs ==
"Let's Stick Together" is a mid-tempo twelve-bar blues-style R&B song. According to music writer Richard Clayton, "Harrison probably intended 'Let’s Stick Together' as his follow-up single [to 'Kansas City'], but a contract dispute prevented him from releasing it while his star was in the ascendant". In 1959, "Kansas City", written by Jerry Leiber and Mike Stoller, was a number one hit for Harrison on both the Billboard R&B and Hot 100 singles chart.

In 1962, Harrison recorded "Let's Stick Together" for Fury Records, one of several labels operated by record producer Bobby Robinson, that had issued "Kansas City". Fury pressed the single with two different A-side and B-sides: "Kansas City Twist" (Fury 1059) and "My Heart Is Yours" (Fury 1063). It had been three years since Harrison's last chart appearance and the singles failed to reach the charts.

In 1969, Harrison reworked the song with the title "Let's Work Together". The two songs use the same melody line and structure, but the lyrics differ:

"Let's Stick Together"

Well now the marriage vow is very sacred
The man put us together now you want to make it
Stick together, come on, come on let's stick together
You know we made a vow not to leave one another never

"Let's Work Together"

Together we will stand divided we'll fall
Come on now people let's get on the ball
And work together, come on, come on let's work together, now, now people
Say now together we will stand, every boy, girl, woman, and man

Instrumentally, the 1962 recording is an ensemble piece, while the one in 1969 is a solo performance, with Harrison (credited as the "Wilbert Harrison One Man Band") providing the vocal, harmonica, guitar, and percussion.

Sue Records released "Let's Work Together" as a two-part single that reached number 32 on the Billboard Hot 100 in 1970, however, it did not appear on the magazine's R&B chart. In Canada, the song reached number 26 on the RPM charts.

== Canned Heat version ==
"Let's Work Together"

Single by Canned Heat
- B-side: "I'm Her Man"
- Released: January 1970 (UK); August 1970 (US)
- Recorded: December 3, 1969
- Studio: International Sound (Los Angeles)
- Genre: Blues rock
- Length: 2:48
- Label: Liberty
- Songwriter: Wilbert Harrison
- Producers: Skip Taylor; Canned Heat

Shortly after the release of Wilbert Harrison's "Let's Work Together", Los Angeles blues-rock band Canned Heat recorded their version of the song. Unlike their previous singles ("On the Road Again", "Going Up the Country", and "Time Was") that featured vocals and harmonica by Alan Wilson, for "Let's Work Together" Bob Hite provided the vocals, with Wilson adding the slide-guitar parts. The song was prepared for release as a single in December 1969, but was cancelled due to the popularity of Harrison's single.

In the UK, where Harrison's single failed to generate interest, Canned Heat's version was released in January 1970. There it became their biggest hit, reaching number two on the UK Singles Chart during a stay of fifteen weeks. In the US, Canned Heat's "Let's Work Together" was first released on August 3, 1970, on their album, Future Blues. An American single followed on August 25, 1970, and reached number 26 on the Billboard Hot 100. In Canada, the song reached number 15 on the RPM charts.

== Bryan Ferry versions ==
"Let's Stick Together"

Single by Bryan Ferry

from the album Let's Stick Together
- B-side: "Sea Breezes"
- Released: May 1976
- Studio: AIR Studios, London
- Genre: Hard rock
- Length: 2:59
- Label: Island
- Songwriter: Wilbert Harrison
- Producers: Chris Thomas; Bryan Ferry

Bryan Ferry singles chronology
"You Go to My Head" (1975)	"Let's Stick Together" (1976)	"The Price of Love" (1976)

Music video
- "Let's Stick Together" on YouTube

In 1976, Island Records released a version of "Let's Stick Together" by Bryan Ferry. The song is the title track for his album of the same name and was recorded at AIR Studios in London. Ferry plays harmonica and electric and acoustic pianos, with John Wetton on bass, Paul Thompson on drums, Mel Collins on soprano saxophone, and Chris Mercer on tenor saxophone. Guitar was by Chris Spedding, who played a Flying V, the first time Ferry had worked with him.

The music video, featuring the band playing the song, includes an appearance by "sexily seductive" model Jerry Hall, Ferry's girlfriend at the time. Hall mimes to the "mid-riff yelping of an unnamed female backing vocalist [that] only adds to the frenetic edge of lustful excitement", according to AllMusic reviewer Dave Thompson. The video was directed by Jonathan Benson (assistant director for some of the Monty Python films), a friend of Ferry's, and the clothes and set were designed by Antony Price. Ferry said his look for the video had been inspired by Clark Gable.

The single spent two weeks at No. 1 in Australia where it was the 9th best-selling single of 1976. It is also Ferry's biggest solo hit in the UK, where it reached number four on the UK chart on June 27, 1976, and was certified silver by the British Phonographic Industry (BPI).

The song is used near the end of the film The Family Plan on Apple TV.

=== 1988 remix ===
In 1988, Ferry released a remix of the song, titled "Let's Stick Together '88", on E.G. Records in the UK. The single reached number 12 on the UK chart on 29 October.

=== Charts ===
==== Weekly charts ====
Chart (1989)	Peak position
Italy Airplay (Music & Media)	18
