= Boogie with Canned Heat =

Studio album by Canned Heat
- Released: January 22, 1968
- Recorded: November–December 1967
- Studio: Liberty Studios
- Genres: Blues rock; boogie rock; psychedelic rock; acid rock
- Length: 44:00
- Label: Liberty
- Producers: Skip Taylor; Dallas Smith

Canned Heat chronology
Canned Heat (1967)	Boogie with Canned Heat (1968)	Living the Blues (1968)

Singles from Boogie with Canned Heat
- 1. "World in a Jug" Released: 1967; 2. "On the Road Again" Released: April 24, 1968

Boogie with Canned Heat is the second studio album by American blues rock band Canned Heat. Released in 1968, it contains mostly original material, unlike their debut album. It was the band's most commercially successful album, reaching number 16 in the US and number 5 in the UK.

Boogie with Canned Heat includes the top 10 hit "On the Road Again", one of their best-known songs. "Amphetamine Annie", a warning about the dangers of amphetamine abuse, also received considerable airplay. "Fried Hockey Boogie" was the first example of one of Canned Heat's boogies, or loose jams. When released on CD in 2005, six tracks originally released on singles were included as bonus tracks.

In 2012, Boogie with Canned Heat was remastered and released on CD by Iconoclassics Records with the original ten tracks, plus six bonus tracks.

== Reception ==
Professional ratings
Review scores
Source	Rating
AllMusic	4.5/5 stars
The Encyclopedia of Popular Music	3/5 stars
The Penguin Guide to Blues Recordings	3/4 stars
The Rolling Stone Album Guide	2/5 stars
Sputnikmusic	4.0/5 stars

The Encyclopedia of Popular Music called the album an "impressive selection," and praised the "in-concert favourite" "Fried Hockey Boogie". Rolling Stone wrote that "'An Owl Song' is perhaps Al Wilson's strongest vocal outing to date — his peculiarly high crooning mumble grooving along over a kicking, chugging rhythm section."

== Track listing ==
=== Side one ===
1. "Evil Woman" (Larry Weiss) – 2:59
2. "My Crime" (Canned Heat) – 3:57
3. "On the Road Again" (Floyd Jones, Alan Wilson) – 5:01
4. "World in a Jug" (Canned Heat) – 3:29
5. "Turpentine Moan" (Canned Heat) – 2:56
6. "Whiskey Headed Woman No. 2" (Bob Hite) – 2:57

=== Side two ===
1. "Amphetamine Annie" (Canned Heat) – 3:36
2. "An Owl Song" (Alan Wilson) – 2:43
3. "Marie Laveau" (Henry Vestine) – 5:18
4. "Fried Hockey Boogie" (Larry Taylor) – 11:07

=== Bonus tracks from 2005 CD release ===
1. "On the Road Again" (single version) – 3:22
2. "Boogie Music" (single version) – 2:46
3. "Goin' Up the Country" (single version) – 2:52
4. "One Kind Favor" – 4:55
5. "Christmas Blues" – 2:36
6. "The Chipmunk Song (Christmas Don't Be Late)" (featuring Alvin and the Chipmunks) – 2:49

=== Bonus tracks from 2012 CD release ===
1. "On the Road Again" [alternate take] (Floyd Jones and Alan Wilson)
2. "Shake, Rattle and Roll" (Charles E. Calhoun)
3. "Whiskey and Wimmen'" (John Lee Hooker)
4. "Mean Old World" (Little Walter, T-Bone Walker, Marl Young)
5. "The Hunter" (Carl Wells, Steve Cropper, Al Jackson, Jr., Booker T. Jones, Donald Dunn)
6. "Fannie Mae" (Buster Brown, Clarence Lewis, Bobby Robinson)

== Personnel ==
Canned Heat

- Bob Hite – lead vocals
- Alan Wilson – slide guitar, lead vocals on "On the Road Again" and "An Owl Song", harmonica
- Henry Vestine – lead guitar
- Larry Taylor – bass guitar
- Adolfo de la Parra – drums

Additional personnel

- Dr. John – horn arrangements, piano
- Sunnyland Slim – piano on "Turpentine Moan"

Production

- Dino Lappas – engineer
- Dallas Smith – producer
