= The Stuff That Dreams Are Made Of =

"The stuff that dreams are made of" is a line of dialog from The Maltese Falcon. It is a reference to a line from Shakespeare's play The Tempest: "We are such stuff as dreams are made on, and our little life is rounded with a sleep."

It may also refer to:

- The Stuff That Dreams Are Made Of (album), a collection of old-time music by various artists (2006)
- The Stuff That Dreams Are Made Of (film), a German movie directed by Alfred Vohrer (1972)
- "The Stuff That Dreams Are Made Of" (song), a song by Carly Simon from her album Coming Around Again (1987)
