= Clarksdale Moan =

Single by Son House
- Released: 1930
- Recorded: May 28, 1930
- Studio: Grafton, Wisconsin, United States
- Genre: Blues, Delta blues
- Length: 3:00
- Label: Paramount
- Songwriter: Son House

Son House singles chronology
"My Black Mama Part 1" / "My Black Mama Part 2" (1930)	"Clarksdale Moan" / "Mississippi County Farm Blues" (1930)	"The Pony Blues" / "The Jinx Blues Part 1" (1967)

"Clarksdale Moan" is a blues song recorded by the Delta blues musician Son House and first released as a 78-RPM single in 1930. The equally sought-after recording "Mississippi County Farm Blues" was the A-side. The song was believed to be lost until 2005, when record collector, Mark Blaesing discovered an original 78 rpm disc in a reasonably good condition. It was released in 2006 on the Yazoo Records album The Stuff That Dreams Are Made Of, which contained many other rare blues recordings from that era.

== Background ==
Son House recorded nine songs for Paramount Records in Grafton, Wisconsin, in 1930, released as 78 rpm records. Seven of these recordings were rediscovered (see below), but the "Clarksdale Moan" 78 continued to elude collectors and was dubbed the "holy grail" of lost blues recordings.

== Discovery ==
In September 2005, a collector announced he had obtained the lost "Clarksdale Moan" 78 in reasonably decent condition. On April 4, 2006, both "Clarksdale Moan" and "Mississippi County Farm Blues" were released on the collection The Stuff That Dreams Are Made Of from Yazoo Records. While "Clarksdale Moan" was unknown to modern collectors, "Mississippi County Farm Blues" is an earlier (and faster) version of a song Son House later recorded at a session for the Library of Congress in 1942, entitled "County Farm Tune". Both "Clarksdale Moan" and "Mississippi County Farm Blues" are also included in the box set When the Levee Breaks: Mississippi Blues, Rare Cuts: 1926–1941, released by JSP Records in 2007.
