= The Transfiguration of Blind Joe Death =

- Cover of the Riverboat Records release of the LP

Studio album by John Fahey
- Released: 1965
- Recorded: 1965 at MIT, Cambridge, MA and Berkeley, CA
- Genre: American primitivism
- Length: 38:34 (original); 38:40 (reissue)
- Label: Riverboat

John Fahey chronology
| The Dance of Death & Other Plantation Favorites (1964) | The Transfiguration of Blind Joe Death (1965) | The Great San Bernardino Birthday Party & Other Excursions (1966) |

Alternative Cover
- Cover of the 1997 reissue

The Transfiguration of Blind Joe Death is a 1965 album by American fingerstyle guitarist and composer John Fahey. Originally issued in a hand-lettered edition of 50, it was Fahey's first album to be released by a label other than his own Takoma Records. As with all of Fahey's independently released early albums, it had little critical recognition upon release. The album has grown in stature since its reissue on CD in 1997 and is now highly regarded critically. It was Fahey's fourth album to see release, though after his fifth album, The Great San Bernardino Birthday Party & Other Excursions, was labeled Guitar Vol. 4, reissues of The Transfiguration of Blind Joe Death were subtitled John Fahey, Volume 5.

== History ==
The title refers to a fictional bluesman named Blind Joe Death, first introduced by Fahey on his debut album Blind Joe Death. For years Fahey and Takoma Records continued to treat the imaginary guitarist as a real person, including booklets with their LPs containing biographical information about him and that he had taught Fahey to play.

The Transfiguration of Blind Joe Death was issued by Riverboat Records, initially in a hand-lettered edition of 50, before The Great San Bernardino Birthday Party (Guitar Vol. 4), but was later reissued by Takoma. Once reissued by Takoma, it became Volume 5, but was already labeled Volume 5 on the Riverboat album sleeves. It was the first Fahey album to be released in the UK, on Transatlantic Records.

The original 1965 liner notes came in a separate booklet, were lengthy and were written by John's roommate Alan Wilson of Canned Heat though attributed to one Charles Holloway, Esq. They begin:

"A disgusting, degenerate, insipid young folklorist from the Croat & Isaiah Nettles Foundation for Ethnological Research meandered mesmerically midst marble mansions in Mattapan, Massachusetts. It was an unsavory, vapid day in the summer of 2010 as the jejune air from Back Bay transubstantiated itself autologically and gradually into an ozone-like atmosphere."

The Transfiguration of Blind Joe Death was partly recorded on the East coast, but more tracks were needed to make the album. Barry Hansen, Fahey's friend and some-time producer and contributor, stated: "We didn't have the budget for a legit studio for that one. So I found someone who had a real nice home recorder and a quiet room. I pretty much set John up and let him play. He was all by himself for most of it. I wasn't even around for many of the takes... He sat there with a dog at his feet. There's one track where the dog barks in the middle of the music—it was my decision to leave that false start in."

== Cover ==
The distinctive cover of The Transfiguration of Blind Joe Death is briefly focused on in a shot of a record store in Stanley Kubrick's film A Clockwork Orange. The jacket design and drawing are by David Omar White.

== Reception ==
Professional ratings
Review scores
| Source | Rating |
|---|---|
| AllMusic | 5/5 stars |
| The Boston Phoenix | 4/4 stars |
| The Encyclopedia of Popular Music | 4/5 stars |
| The Great Rock Discography | 7/10 |
| The Great Folk Discography | 8/10 |
| MusicHound Rock | 4.5/5 stars |
| MusicHound Folk | 4/5 stars |
| The Rolling Stone Album Guide | 3.5/5 stars |
| Stylus Magazine | A+ |

After its reissue in 1997, "The Transfiguration of Blind Joe Death" received highly laudatory reviews. In his review for Stylus Magazine, Chris Smith gave it an A+ rating and wrote, "Fahey excels at conjuring up a painstakingly developed sense of time and place in his playing, and if its predecessor at times accurately mapped out the restive confines of the dark night of the soul, this record no less vividly represents a (mildly acid-fried) return to the front porch and the prairie." Calling "On the Sunny Side of the Ocean" the "undeniable highlight of the album", he refers to the rest of the songs generally as "...unpredictable, complex, and evocative as any of Fahey’s previous, more aggressively daring work." AllMusic reviewer Steven McDonald conceded that the album "has a lot of rough edges in terms of the recording but a tremendous amount of power when it comes to the music. Fahey was at the top of his game".

Musician said it "balance[s] whimsy and dignity, melody and dissonance, in a wholly original and very bent manner..." and music critic Jeff Lindholm, writing for the folk and world music magazine Dirty Linen, called it "a mix of old-timey country, ragtime, Spanish flamenco, Indian classical music and more. Quiet, beautiful and jaw-droppingly intricate."

In a review for the 1967 Takoma reissue, ED Denson called the liner notes "a paranoid vision of reality unrivalled since Kafka. Nothing is what it purports to be directly, but everything is "in a certain sense" — people make statements like characters in B-grade horror films, the trivial becomes significant, the meaningful, nothing."

In 2017, Pitchfork ranked it at No. 74 on their list of "The 200 Best Albums of the 1960s", writing: "There’s a raw edge to the recording—strings buzz, notes echo, even a dog barks—that fits Fahey’s mission to get to the core of things. His playing is precise, to be sure, but The Transfiguration of Blind Joe Death is much more about revelation than refinement."

== Reissues ==
- The Transfiguration of Blind Joe Death was reissued on LP by Riverboat Records in 1967, 1970 and 1972.
- The Transfiguration of Blind Joe Death was reissued on LP by Transatlantic Records in 1968.
- The Transfiguration of Blind Joe Death was reissued on LP by Takoma Records in 1967 and 1973.
- The Transfiguration of Blind Joe Death was reissued on LP by Chrysalis Records in 1980.
- The Transfiguration of Blind Joe Death was reissued on CD by Takoma Records in 1997 with notes by pianist and guitarist George Winston.

== Track listing ==
All songs by John Fahey unless otherwise noted. Song times are from the original release.

Side one

1. "Beautiful Linda Getchell" (Fahey, L. Mayne Smith) – 1:50
2. "Orinda-Moraga" – 3:55
3. "I Am the Resurrection" – 3:00
4. "On the Sunny Side of the Ocean" – 3:00
5. "Tell Her to Come Back Home" (Fahey, Uncle Dave Macon) – 2:45
6. "My Station Will Be Changed Awhile" – 2:02
7. "101 Is a Hard Road to Travel" (Fahey, Macon) – 2:17

Side two

1. "How Green Was My Valley" – 2:15
2. "Bicycle Built for Two" – 1:10 (arrangement of the 1892 song, "Daisy Bell")
3. "The Death of the Clayton Peacock" – 2:52
4. "Brenda's Blues" – 1:45
5. "Old Southern Medley" (Fahey, Stephen Foster, Charlie Patton, Daniel Decatur Emmett) – 6:08
6. "Come Back Baby" – 2:15
7. "Poor Boy" (Fahey, Bukka White) – 2:25
8. "Saint Patrick's Hymn" (based on "Saint Patrick's Breastplate") – 0:55

== Personnel ==
- John Fahey – guitar
- L. Mayne Smith – banjo

Production notes:

- Barry Hansen – engineer, editing
- Brian Hansen – engineer
- David Omar White – cover design, illustrations
- John Fahey – original liner notes
- George Winston – reissue liner notes
- Samuel Charters – reissue liner notes
- Phil DeLancie – remastering
