= The Great San Bernardino Birthday Party & Other Excursions =

Studio album by John Fahey
- Released: 1966
- Recorded: 1962–1966 at Los Angeles and Berkeley, CA
- Genre: American primitivism, avant-garde, psychedelic folk
- Length: 44:35
- Label: Takoma
- Producer: ED Denson, John Fahey

John Fahey chronology
The Transfiguration of Blind Joe Death (1965)	The Great San Bernardino Birthday Party & Other Excursions (1966)	Days Have Gone By (1967)

The Great San Bernardino Birthday Party & Other Excursions is an album by American fingerstyle guitarist and composer John Fahey, released in 1966. The cover simply labels the album Guitar Vol. 4 (it was his fourth release on his own Takoma label, but his fifth album) while the liner notes label it The Great San Bernardino Birthday Party & Other Excursions. The title never appeared on the record labels themselves. It marked the beginning of Fahey's interest in his recording of experimental soundscapes and sound effects. Despite Fahey's distaste for the 1960s counterculture, it is his release most often referred to as psychedelic.

== History ==
The album begins Fahey's interest in soundscapes and sound effects, using backward tapes and dissonance. Richie Unterberger, in his Allmusic review, stated: "Edited together from several pieces, the 19-minute "The Great San Bernardino Birthday Party" anticipated elements of psychedelia with its nervy improvisations and odd guitar tunings." Fahey himself called it "a histrionic, disorganised outpouring of blather" although he had kind things to say of some of the other songs. Unterberger also states "Despite Fahey's curmudgeonly dismissal of the record several decades later, it's an important, if uneven, effort that ultimately endures as one of the highlights of his discography."

Fahey, ED Denson and Barry Hansen assembled the record shortly after the release of The Transfiguration of Blind Joe Death from both new music and parts that had been on tape for years.

Alan Wilson, who appears on this recording and was a member of the band Canned Heat, had once assisted Fahey in his UCLA master's thesis on the music of Charley Patton. Fahey and Wilson duet on "Sail Away Ladies"; this version of the tune displays an eastern influence, with Wilson playing the South Indian veena. This track became a lifelong favourite of the British DJ John Peel, whose championing of Fahey's music on his influential BBC radio shows helped the guitarist gain an audience outside the United States. Peel included "Sail Away Ladies" in his 1999 Peelenium, a personal selection from 100 years of recorded music.

== Reception ==
Professional ratings
Review scores
Source	Rating
AllMusic	4.5/5 stars
The Encyclopedia of Popular Music	3/5 stars
The Great Folk Discography	7/10
The Rolling Stone Album Guide	3/5 stars
Spin Alternative Record Guide	9/10

Music critic Glenn Astarita, writing for All About Jazz about the album's reissue, said that "despite the inferior audio quality on some of these tracks, it is always a joy to hear this great musician reinvent previously explored terrain. Here, we are provided with a snapshot of a period in music when The Beatles were hot, and the dawning of the psychedelic age was upon us. Simply put, John Fahey pushed the acoustic guitar to its limits via his trail blazing applications and investigative spirit..." In his retrospective review for AllMusic, music critic Richie Unterberger referred to the album as a "hodgepodge of tracks" but also stated, "Nevertheless, it stands as his most, well, far-out work, and one of his most innovative... The six briefer pieces that comprised the rest of the record also broke ground with their unsettling moods and dissonances..."

Despite his disdain for hippies and the 1960s hippie culture, then and later in life, The Great San Bernardino Birthday Party & Other Excursions was marked as psychedelic despite Fahey's remonstrances. Kevin Hainey of Exclaim! called it one of the "Eleven Sturdy Pillars of Psych-Folk" and "...this is the only [one] that blatantly flirts with psychedelia. It’s also the only to enlist other musicians, adding occasional flute, organ and veena to Fahey’s most 'out there' early excursions." In his 1998 story for The Wire, Edwin Pouncey referred to it as "tinged with an enduring hippy mystique."

== Reissues ==
- The Great San Bernardino Birthday Party & Other Excursions was reissued on CD in 2000 by Takoma Records.

== Track listing ==
- Times are from the original 1966 LP release.

Side one

1. "The Great San Bernardino Birthday Party" (Fahey) – 19:00
2. "Knott's Berry Farm Molly" (Fahey) – 4:30

Side two

1. "Will the Circle Be Unbroken" (Traditional) – 4:45
2. "Guitar Excursions into the Unknown" (Fahey) – 3:30
3. "900 Miles" (Traditional) – 3:00
4. "Sail Away Ladies" (Traditional) – 6:00
5. "Oh Come, Oh Come Emanuel" (Traditional) – 1:55

== Personnel ==
- John Fahey – guitar
- Alan "Blind Owl" Wilson – veena
- R. Anthony Lee – organ
- Nancy McClean – flute

Production notes

- ED Denson – producer, engineer
- John Fahey – producer, engineer
- Barry Hansen – reissue producer
- Chris Strachwitz – engineer (listed only on original 1966 release)
- Bill Meyer – reissue liner notes
- David Goines – cover design
