= Duncan and Brady =

Song by Wilmer Watts & his Lonely Eagles
- Published: 1925
- Recorded: 1925
- Genre: Ballad, Murder ballad
- Songwriter: Traditional

"Duncan and Brady" (Roud 4177), also known as "Been on the Job Too Long", "Twinkle, Twinkle, Little Star", or simply "Brady", is a traditional murder ballad about the shooting of a policeman, Brady, by a bartender, Duncan. The song's lyrics stemmed from actual events, involving the shooting of James Brady in the Charles Starkes Saloon in St. Louis, Missouri. Harry Duncan was convicted of the murder, and later executed. First recorded by Wilmer Watts & his Lonely Eagles in 1929, it has been recorded numerous times, most famously by Lead Belly, and also by Judy Henske, Dave Van Ronk, The Johnson Mountain Boys, New Riders of the Purple Sage, David Nelson Band, Martin Simpson, and Bob Dylan.

== Origins ==
Lyrics to the song, including the main characters Duncan and Brady, originated from a barroom shooting in St. Louis, Missouri. On October 6, 1890, several police officers, including James Brady, arrived at the Charles Starkes Saloon in downtown St. Louis, where a bar fight was taking place. The officers tried to arrest patrons of the bar suspected of starting the fight, which prompted a gunfight. Brady was shot by an unknown man, supposedly by the bar's owner, Charles Starkes. Harry Duncan claimed such when he was arrested for Brady's murder; Starkes denied the claim. Duncan was convicted and was sentenced to hang, but through several appeals, the case made its way to the Supreme Court. However, this appeal was denied, and Duncan was hanged on July 27, 1894. It was rumored that Charles Starkes later confessed to the murder on his deathbed.

However, a Mrs. Tom Barrett (or Barret), a resident of Marlin, Texas, wrote to folklorist Dorothy Scarborough about the song's lyrics and origins. She identified Waco as the scene of the shooting, although she did not specify whether or not it occurred in a bar. The song may bear a close relation to the tune of the traditional Negro ballad "Bad Man Ballad".

== Lyrics ==
"Duncan and Brady" is a typical "bad man" murder ballad, such as "Frankie and Johnny" or "Stagger Lee". The song begins with Brady, a policeman, riding around in an electric car, with a "mean look in his eye", looking to "shoot somebody just to see him die". He walks into a bar, which Duncan is tending, and arrests him. Duncan then shoots Brady, and Brady then dies. However, in the next verse, Brady is told that he "knew he done wrong", because he was,

Walkin' in the room when the game was goin' on
Knockin down windows, breakin' down the door

Women hear of the death of Brady and all dress in red. In a second variation recorded by Lead Belly, there is also mention of Brady's wife, who expects to get a pension from his death.

It's interesting to note that even though the detailed news article and lyrics from Leadbelly and others identify Brady as the policeman and Duncan as the civilian, Wilmer Watts who first recorded the song places the star on Duncan's chest:

Brady was a worker on the telephone wire
Long come Duncan with a shining star

Wilmer Watts was born and lived in North Carolina and only recorded for Paramount in Chicago in 1929. The Duncan and Brady incident happened in 1890. Therefore, it is likely Watts heard the story or the song after it had passed through many singers.

== Recordings ==
Performer	Album	Year	Variant	Notes
Wilmer Watts & Lonely Eagles	Paramount Old Time Recordings	1929	"Been on the Job Too Long"	
Blind Jesse Harris	Field Recordings, Vol. 4: Mississippi & Alabama (1934-1942)	1937	"Brady"	Recorded by John Lomax
Camp No. 1 convicts	N/A	1941	"Duncan and Brady"	Recorded and transcribed by John and Alan Lomax in 1933 for the 1941 book Our Singing Country
Lead Belly	Where Did You Sleep Last Night	1947	"Duncan and Brady"	Recorded both a cappella and with guitar
Win Stracke	Americana		"Duncan and Brady"	
Paul Clayton	Wanted for Murder: Songs of Outlaws and Desperadoes	1956	"Duncan and Brady"	
Dave Van Ronk	Ballads, Blues, and a Spiritual	1959	"Duncan and Brady"	
Tom Rush	Got a Mind to Ramble	1963	"Duncan and Brady"	
Koerner, Ray & Glover	Lots More Blues, Rags, and Hollers	1964	"Duncan and Brady"	
Whiskeyhill Singers	Dave Guard & Whiskeyhill Singers	1962	"Duncan and Brady"	
Judy Henske	High Flying Bird	1963	"Duncan and Brady"	
Hoyt Axton	The Best of Hoyt Axton	1964	"Been on the Job Too Long"	
New Riders of the Purple Sage	Powerglide	1972	"Duncan and Brady"	
Tom Akstens	Original and Traditional Music	1975	"Duncan and Brady"	Recorded as a medley with the song "Mole's Moan"
Greg Brown and Bill Morrissey	Friend of Mine (Greg Brown album)	1993	"Duncan and Brady"	
Rick Ilowite and Keith Thomson	This Way / That Way	1993	"Duncan and Brady"	Album produced by Jorma Kaukonen, and includes contributions from Kaukonen, Danny Kalb, and others.
Chris Smither	Drive You Home Again	1999	"Duncan & Brady"	
Nathan Rogers	True Stories	2005	"Ballad of Duncan & Brady"	
Martin Simpson	Prodigal Son	2007	"Duncan & Brady"	
Bob Dylan	Bootleg Series Vol. 8: Tell Tale Signs	2008	"Duncan & Brady"	Originally recorded with David Bromberg for an unreleased album
Big Smith	Roots, Shoots, & Branches	2010	"Brady and Duncan"	
Creek Snakes	Bastille Day	2011	"Duncan & Brady"	
