= Going Up the Country =

1968 song by Canned Heat

- US single picture sleeve

Single by Canned Heat

from the album Living the Blues
- B-side: "One Kind Favor"
- Released: 1968
- Recorded: 1968
- Studio: I.D. Sound Recorders, Hollywood, California
- Genre: Blues rock
- Length: 2:50
- Label: Liberty
- Songwriter: Alan Wilson (see text)
- Producers: Canned Heat, Skip Taylor

Canned Heat singles chronology
"On the Road Again" (1968)	"Going Up the Country" (1968)	"Time Was" (1969)

"Going Up the Country" (also "Goin' Up the Country") is a song adapted and recorded by American blues rock band Canned Heat. Called a "rural hippie anthem", it became one of the band's biggest hits and best-known songs. As with their previous single, "On the Road Again", the song was adapted from a 1920s blues song by Henry Thomas "Bull Doze Blues" and sung by Alan Wilson.

== Background and composition ==
Canned Heat, who were enthusiasts of the early blues, based "Going Up the Country" on "Bull Doze Blues", recorded in 1928 by Texas bluesman Henry Thomas. Thomas was from the songster tradition and had a unique sound, sometimes accompanying himself on quills, an early Afro-American wind instrument similar to panpipes. He recorded "Bull Doze Blues" in Chicago on June 13, 1928, for Vocalion Records.

For "Going Up the Country", Canned Heat's Wilson used Thomas' melody on the quills and his basic rhythm, but arranged it for a rock setting and rewrote the lyrics. In addition to the bass and drum rhythm section, Henry Vestine supplied a "light electric rhythm guitar" and multi-instrumentalist Jim Horn reproduced Thomas' quill parts on the flute.

Although linked to the counterculture of the 1960s' back-to-the-land movement, Wilson's lyrics are ambiguous, leading some to suggest they were about evading the draft during the Vietnam War by moving to Canada:

Now, baby, pack your leaving trunk, you know we've got to leave today
Just exactly where we're going, I cannot say, but we might even leave the U.S.A.
'Cause there's a brand new game that I don't wanna play

== Recording ==
The song was recorded at I.D. Sound Recorders in Hollywood, CA. Although Bob Hite is seen playing the flute on video performances of the song, in the studio it was legendary session man Jim Horn who played the part on record.

== Releases and charts ==
In October 1968, Liberty Records first released "Going Up the Country" on Canned Heat's third album, Living the Blues, and followed it with a single on November 22, 1968. The single peaked at number 11 on the Billboard Hot 100 singles chart on January 25, 1969, making it the band's best showing on the main U.S. chart. On January 6, 1969, the song reached number 5 on the Canadian RPM charts, Number 4 on the New Zealand Listener charts and on January 7, 1969, the song peaked at number 19 on the UK Singles Chart.

The song appears on several Canned Heat compilation albums, including Canned Heat Cookbook, Let's Work Together: The Best of Canned Heat (1989) and Uncanned! The Best of Canned Heat (1994). The group performed "Going Up the Country" at the Woodstock music festival in August 1969. The song is used in the Woodstock film and appears on the original soundtrack album.

The song was also included in the soundtrack for the 2010 skateboarding video game Skate 3.

== Certifications ==
Region	Certification	Certified units/sales
United Kingdom (BPI)	Silver	200,000^{‡}
^{‡} Sales+streaming figures based on certification alone.
