= Delta Blues and Spirituals =

Live album by Son House
- Released: 1995
- Recorded: 1970
- Genre: Blues
- Label: Capitol Records
- Producer: Pete Welding

Son House chronology
The Complete Library of Congress Sessions 1941–1942 (1991)	Delta Blues and Spirituals (1995)	Live at the Gaslight Cafe NYC, January 3, 1965 (2000)

Delta Blues and Spirituals is a live album by the American blues musician Son House, released in 1995. It was part of the Capitol Blues Collection, a reissue series that eventually numbered around 20 albums.

== Production ==
The album was produced and organized by Pete Welding. It was recorded at the 100 Club, in London, in 1970. House played four spirituals and four blues songs, and provided monologues explaining the connections between the two forms. Al Wilson performed on a couple of songs.

The album liner notes are by David Evans.

== Critical reception ==
Professional ratings
Review scores
Source	Rating
AllMusic	4.5/5 stars
The Encyclopedia of Popular Music	4/5 stars
MusicHound Folk: The Essential Album Guide	4/5 stars
The Penguin Guide to Blues Recordings	3.5/4 stars
Pittsburgh Post-Gazette	3/4 stars
(The New) Rolling Stone Album Guide	4/5 stars

The Pittsburgh Post-Gazette considered the album "filled with the raw power and emotion that make [House's] music so memorable." CMJ New Music Monthly deemed it "the best by far" of the 1995 Capitol blues reissues. The Dallas Morning News noted the "somber material ... that showcases the religious face of Mississippi folk music." The Richmond Times-Dispatch stated: "So honest as to convey an unnaturally solemn edge to the material, Son House's gritty release is as rich as Delta soil."

AllMusic wrote that the album "remains one of the last vibrant documents of one of the most essential fathers of Delta blues at the top of his game." The Penguin Guide to Blues Recordings concluded that "House was galvanized by the enthusiasm of the audience ... In turn, the strength of his performance fired up the audience, creating an extraordinary feedback loop."

== Track listing ==
1. Monologue - The B-L-U-E-S
2. "Between Midnight and Day" (with Alan Wilson)
3. "I Want to Go Home on the Morning Train" (with Alan Wilson)
4. "Levee Camp Moan"
5. "This Little Light of Mine"
6. Monologue - Thinkin' Strong
7. "Death Letter Blues"
8. "How to Treat a Man" (with Delta Dave)
9. "Grinnin' in Your Face"
10. "John the Revelator"
