= Wilmer Watts =

American singer-songwriter

Wilmer Watts (c. 1897 – August 21, 1943) was an American old time singer, banjo player and bandleader who recorded a series of records for Paramount Records in the 1920s.

== Biography ==
Watts was born in Mount Tabor (now Tabor City) a market town in Columbus County, North Carolina, United States, between 1896 and 1898. After World War I he moved to the city of Belmont, North Carolina where he worked as a weaver in textile factories. Having learned several instruments including banjo, fiddle, guitar, dobro, autoharp, harmonica, musical saw and drums he became a semi-professional musician around 1921 and made his first recordings in January or February 1927 as a duo with local guitarist Charlie Wilson (1900–?) with a single entitled "The Sporting Cowboy" which was not released at the time. With a new trio under the name of Wilmer Watts and His Lonely Eagles they recorded six sides for Paramount Records in 1927 using a line-up that included Charles Freshour (1900–1959) on guitar and the then unusual steel guitar which was played by Wilson. In 1929 he returned to Paramount's New York studios. This time Wilson was replaced on steel guitar by Palmer Rhyne (1904–1967), a fellow factory worker friend of Watts. These sessions resulted in fourteen sides.

After the 1927 sessions Wilson left the group and was replaced by Palmer Rayne for the 1929 sessions. The Great Depression ended the recordings of many rural artists with Paramount Records going out of business in 1935 and Watts making no further recordings. Watts often gigged as a one-man-band playing as many as five instruments at once. In 1931 Watts won a talent contest for his act awarded by Uncle Dave Macon.

== Recordings and musical style ==
Wilmer's banjo playing was quite simple and repetitive, staying to mid-tempo songs and quite different from the more complex ragtime influenced picking of Charlie Poole or blues singer Papa Charlie Jackson or the fast choppy style of Uncle Dave Macon. Unlike most of his contemporaries Watts' musical influences seem to be based mostly on traditional Anglo-Celtic sources along with blues, ragtime, or minstrelsy and his songs have a distinctive droning modal quality compared to those of his North Carolina contemporary Charlie Poole. In his lyrical themes (at least in his recorded works) Watts largely avoided traditional folk songs and focused on more modern themes ranging from blues to a few political protest songs usually in a mocking vein similar to those of songwriter Joe Hill collected in the "Little Red Songbook" of the I.W.W.

The only photo of Watts commonly known (showing him holding a fiddle rather than his usual banjo) was reproduced by the artist R. Crumb for a collection of trading cards of old time country musicians.

== Works ==
Among Watts' best known recordings are:

- "Been On The Job Too Long"; a murder ballad later covered by such artists as Lead Belly and Bob Dylan under the title of "Duncan and Brady".
- "Walk Right In Belmont"; the first known recorded version of "The Midnight Special", a later standard later covered by Lead Belly, Creedence Clearwater Revival and Mac Wiseman. This single was originally released under the name "Watts & Wilson" and later through Paramount's subsidiary label Broadway Records under the name "Watts & Wiggins".
- "Banjo Sam"; an especially repetitive modal song with surrealistic lyrics later covered by Grandpa Jones.
- "Cotton Mill Blues"; a bluesy protest song about the plight of factory workers, based on a 1900 poem "A Factory Rhyme", later covered by Pete Seeger.
- "Knocking Down Casey Jones"; a version of one of the many tribute songs then common to famous train engineer Casey Jones. This song is notably more heroic than Joe Hill's I.W.W. version.
- "Fighting in The War With Spain"; an anti-war song mocking the Spanish–American War in which Watts makes light of the war and portrays himself as a deserter.
- "The Fate Of Rhoda Sweetin"; A murder ballad sung and reportedly written by Charles Freshour about his own sister. This single was credited to Charles Freshour and The Lonely Eagles.
- "She's A Hard Boiled Rose"; A version of a Tin Pan Alley song later used in another version by stripper Gypsy Rose Lee.
- "Charles Guitaw"; A ballad (with a misspelled title) about Charles Guiteau, the assassin of President James Garfield, this song was later covered by Kelly Harrell, Bascom Lamar Lunsford, Norman Blake and Ramblin Jack Elliot.

== General references ==
- Stars of Country Music, (University of Illinois Press, 1975)
- Paramount Old Time Recordings Box Set (JSP Records)
- The Stuff Dreams Are Made Of (Yazoo Records, 2006)
