= Canned Heat (album) =

Studio album by Canned Heat
- Released: July 1967
- Recorded: 1967
- Studios: Los Angeles, California
- Genre: Blues rock
- Length: 38:05
- Label: Liberty
- Producer: Cal Carter

Canned Heat chronology
Canned Heat (1967)	Boogie with Canned Heat (1968)

Professional ratings
Review scores
Source	Rating
AllMusic	4/5 stars
Rolling Stone	(neutral)

Canned Heat is the debut studio album by American blues rock band Canned Heat, released shortly after their appearance at the 1967 Monterey Pop Festival. The album consists of covers of traditional and popular blues songs.

== Chart performance ==
The album debuted on Billboard magazine's Top LP's chart in the issue dated August 12, 1967, peaking at No. 76 during a twenty-three-week run on the chart.

== Rerelease ==
Canned Heat was re-released on CD in 1999 by French label MAM Productions under the title Rollin' and Tumblin'.

== Track listing ==
Side one
No.	Title	Writer(s)	Length
1.	"Rollin' and Tumblin'"	Muddy Waters, Hambone Willie Newbern	3:11
2.	"Bullfrog Blues"	traditional	2:20
3.	"Evil Is Going On"	Willie Dixon	2:24
4.	"Goin' Down Slow"	James Oden	3:48
5.	"Catfish Blues"	Robert Petway	6:48

Side two
No.	Title	Writer(s)	Length
6.	"Dust My Broom"	Robert Johnson, Elmore James	3:18
7.	"Help Me"	Sonny Boy Williamson II	3:12
8.	"Big Road Blues"	Tommy Johnson	3:15
9.	"The Story of My Life"	Guitar Slim	3:43
10.	"The Road Song"	Floyd Jones	3:16
11.	"Rich Woman"	Dorothy LaBostrie, McKinley Millet	3:04
Total length:			38:05

== Personnel ==
=== Canned Heat ===
- Bob Hite – lead vocals (except on "Help Me")
- Alan Wilson – rhythm and slide guitar, lead vocals on "Help Me", harmonica
- Henry Vestine – lead guitar
- Larry Taylor – bass
- Frank Cook – drums

=== Additional musicians ===
- Ray Johnson (brother of Plas Johnson) – piano

== Charts ==
Chart (1967)	Peak position
US Billboard Top LPs	76
