= Living the Blues =

Studio album by Canned Heat
- Released: November 1, 1968
- Recorded: August–October 1968
- Studios: I.D. Sound Studios and "live" at the Kaleidoscope, Hollywood, California
- Genres: Blues rock; psychedelic rock; acid rock
- Length: 88:03
- Label: Liberty
- Producer: Skip Taylor

Canned Heat chronology
Boogie with Canned Heat (1968)	Living the Blues (1968)	Hallelujah (1969)

Professional ratings
Review scores
Source	Rating
AllMusic	3/5 stars
Rolling Stone	(neutral)
The Penguin Guide to Blues Recordings	3/4 stars

Living the Blues is the third album by American blues rock band Canned Heat, a double album released in late 1968. It was one of the first double albums to place well on album charts. It features Canned Heat's signature song, "Going Up the Country", which would later be used in the Woodstock film. John Mayall appears on piano on "Walking by Myself" and "Bear Wires". Dr. John appears on "Boogie Music". The 20-minute trippy suite "Parthenogenesis" is dwarfed by the album-length "Refried Boogie", recorded live.

== Chart performance ==
The album debuted on Billboard magazine's Top LP's chart in the issue dated December 7, 1968, peaking at No. 18 during a seventeen-week run on the chart.

== Track listing ==
Side one

1. "Pony Blues" (Charlie Patton) – 3:48
2. "My Mistake" (Alan Wilson) – 3:22
3. "Sandy's Blues" (Bob Hite) – 6:46
4. "Going Up the Country" (Alan Wilson; Henry Thomas) – 2:50
5. "Walking by Myself" (Jimmy Rogers) – 2:29
6. "Boogie Music" (L.T. Tatman III) – 3:00

- "Tell Me Man Blues" (1929 recording by Henry Sims) – 0:15

Side two

1. "One Kind Favor" (Lemon Jefferson) – 4:44
2. "Parthenogenesis" (Canned Heat) – 19:57

- I Nebulosity
- II Rollin' and Tumblin'
- III Five Owls
- IV Bear Wires
- V Snooky Flowers
- VI Sunflower Power (RMS Is Truth)
- VII Raga Kafi
- VIII Icebag
- IX Childhood's End

Side three

1. "Refried Boogie (Part I)" (Canned Heat) (Recorded Live) – 20:10

Side four

1. "Refried Boogie (Part II)" (Canned Heat) (Recorded Live) – 20:50

== Personnel ==
Canned Heat

- Bob Hite – vocals
- Alan Wilson – slide guitar, vocals, harmonica, jaw-harp (tracks 2.I, 2.II, 2.IX), chromatic harp (track 2.VIII)
- Henry Vestine – lead guitar
- Larry Taylor – bass, congas (track 2.V)
- Adolfo de la Parra – drums

Additional personnel

- Dr. John – horn arrangements, piano (track 6)
- Miles Grayson – horn arrangements (track 3)
- John Fahey – guitar (track 2.I)
- John Mayall – piano (tracks 5 & 2.IV)
- Jim Horn – flute (track 4)
- Joe Sample – piano (track 3)

Production

- Rich Moore – engineer
- Ivan Fisher – assistant engineer
- Skip Taylor – producer
- Canned Heat – producer

== Charts ==
Chart (1968)	Peak position
US Billboard Top LPs	18
