= Alan Wilson (musician) =

American blues rock musician (1943–1970)

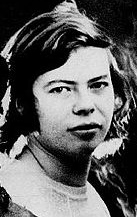
- Wilson in 1970
- Born: Alan Christie Wilson; July 4, 1943; Arlington, Massachusetts, U.S.
- Died: September 3, 1970 (aged 27); Topanga, California, U.S.
- Resting place: Cremated; ashes scattered in Sequoia National Park
- Other names: Blind Owl; Charles Holloway, Esq.
- Occupations: Musician; songwriter
- Awards: Blues Hall of Fame Legendary Blues Artist
- Musical career
- Genres: Blues; blues rock; electric blues; boogie rock
- Instruments: Guitar; vocals; harmonica
- Years active: 1960–1970
- Label: Liberty Records
- Formerly of: Canned Heat
- Website: alanwilsoncannedheat.com

Alan Christie Wilson (July 4, 1943 – September 3, 1970), nicknamed "Blind Owl", was an American musician, best known as the co-founder, leader, co-lead singer, and primary composer of the blues rock band Canned Heat. He sang and played harmonica and guitar with the group, live and on recordings. Wilson was the lead singer for the group's two biggest U.S. hit singles: "On the Road Again" and "Going Up the Country".

== Early years ==
Alan Christie Wilson was born on July 4, 1943, to John (Jack) Wilson, a bricklayer, and Shirley Bingham, an artist. He grew up in the Boston suburb of Arlington, Massachusetts. He had an older sister Darrell. His parents divorced when he was three and both later remarried.

Wilson was highly intelligent, setting him apart from his peers. As a result, he was often bullied by his schoolmates. His father, Jack, was a ham radio operator. Alan became involved with amateur radio as a child but his interest soon turned to music after his stepmother Barbara bought him a jazz record. Some of Wilson's first efforts at performing music publicly came during his teen years when he learned trombone, teaching himself the instrumental parts from the record. Later he formed a jazz ensemble with other musically oriented friends from school, called the Crescent City Hot Five.

Wilson was into traditional New Orleans music, and, later, classical European and Indian music. He was also on the high school tennis team. Eventually, Wilson quit trombone. Around the same time, Wilson began to develop a fascination with blues music after a friend played a Muddy Waters record for him, The Best of Muddy Waters. Inspired by Little Walter, he took up harmonica, and, soon after, the acoustic guitar after hearing a John Lee Hooker record. Some of Wilson's other major influences included Skip James, Robert Johnson, Son House, Charley Patton, Tommy Johnson, John Lee Hooker, and Bukka White.

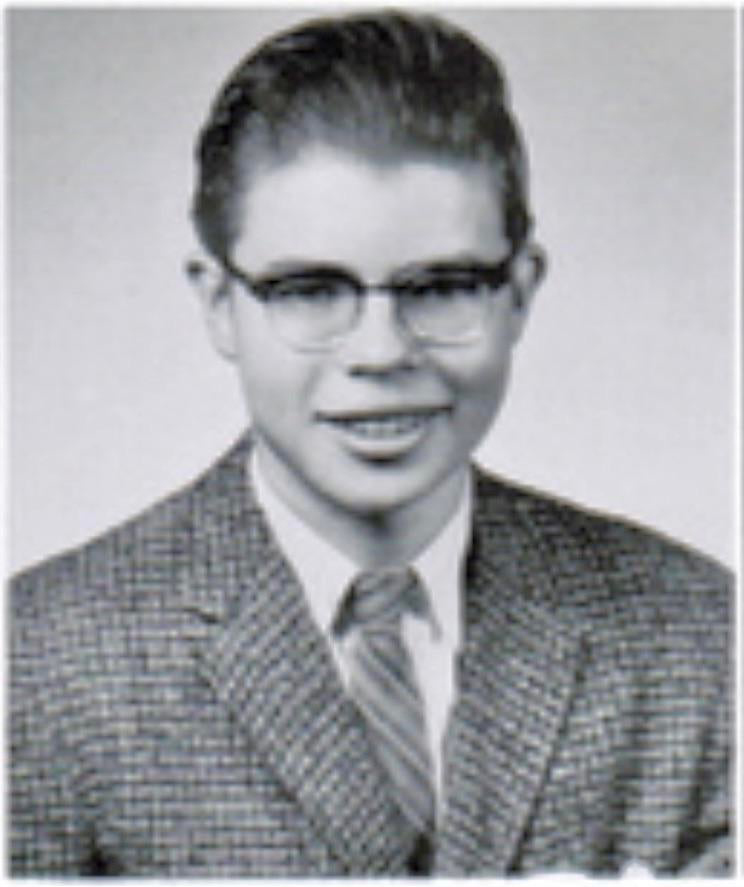
Alan Wilson's Arlington High School senior portrait, 1961

After graduating from Arlington High School in 1961, he majored in music at Boston University. His academics had earned him a National Merit Scholarship and the F.E. Thompson Scholarship Fund from the Town of Arlington. Wilson developed into a dedicated student of early blues, writing a number of articles for the Broadside of Boston newspaper and the folk-revival magazine Little Sandy Review, including a piece on bluesman Robert Pete Williams. Anxious to play music rather than study it, Wilson quit school after only a year and a half. To make ends meet, Wilson worked with his father as a bricklayer, and occasionally gave harmonica and guitar lessons.

== Career ==
In 1962, Wilson met Harvard student and fellow blues enthusiast David Evans in a record store, and the two began playing as a team around the Cambridge coffeehouse folk-blues circuit, with Evans on vocals and guitar, and Wilson on harmonica and occasionally second guitar. The two played a repertoire of mostly classic-era blues covers. Heavily influenced by Skip James, Wilson eventually began singing in a similar way to James' high pitch. In high school, Wilson studied James' 1931 recordings with great ardor. Some of his first singing attempts took place behind a closed bedroom door; and when a family member overheard him, he was embarrassed. Wilson eventually perfected the distinctive falsetto for which he would become known.

The early 1960s saw a "rediscovery" of pre-war blues artists by young, white blues enthusiasts, including James, Mississippi John Hurt, Bukka White, and Son House. In 1964, blues enthusiast Tom Hoskins located Hurt, who at the time had been working on a local farm in his native Mississippi. Hoskins persuaded Hurt to come north to Cambridge for a gig. Wilson was invited to accompany Hurt on harmonica. Said Hoskins, "He was brilliant."

House, considered by Wilson to be one of the greatest singers in blues history, was located in Rochester, New York, in 1964, but it was evident that House had forgotten his songs due to his long absence from music. Wilson played House's old recordings from 1930 and 1943 for him and demonstrated them on guitar to revive House's memory. House recorded Father of Folk Blues for Columbia Records in 1965. Two of the selections on the set featured Wilson on harmonica and guitar. In a letter to Jazz Journal, published in the September 1965 issue, House's manager Dick Waterman remarked the following about Wilson and the project:

It is a solo album, except for backing on two cuts by a 21-year-old White boy from Cambridge by the name of Al Wilson. Al plays second guitar on "Empire State Express" and harp on "Levee Camp Moan." Al never recorded before, but he has backed John Hurt, Skip James, Sleepy John Estes, Bukka White and many others. He is good, and the record will prove it.

Al Wilson taught Son House how to play Son House. I can tell you, flatly, that without Al invigorating and revitalizing Son, there would have been no Son House rediscovery. All of Son's successful concert appearances, recordings and him being remembered as having a great second career—all that was because of Al rejuvenating his music.

== Canned Heat ==
During his time performing in Cambridge, Wilson met the American guitarist John Fahey, the "Father of American Primitive Guitar". With Fahey's encouragement, Wilson moved with Fahey to Los Angeles in 1965 with the aim of having Wilson assist with his UCLA master's thesis on Charley Patton. Because Wilson forgot his glasses during the trip, Fahey gave him the nickname "Blind Owl" owing to his extreme nearsightedness, roundish facial features and scholarly nature. In one instance, when he was playing at a wedding, he laid his guitar on the wedding cake because he did not see it. As Canned Heat's drummer Fito de la Parra wrote in his book: "Without the glasses, Alan literally could not recognize the people he played with at two feet, that's how blind the 'Blind Owl' was."

Once in Los Angeles, Fahey released The Transfiguration of Blind Joe Death. Wilson provided the liner notes under the pseudonym of "Charles Holloway". In 1966, Wilson recorded a series of traditional Indian ragas on Fahey's Takoma label but that set was not issued. Four of Wilson's ragas later appeared as the nine-part soundscape "Parthenogenesis" on Canned Heat's third album, Living the Blues. A portion of "Raga Kafi" is performed on the chromatic harmonica. Fahey's 1992 album Old Girlfriends and Other Horrible Memories features more of "Raga Kafi" in "Fear & Loathing at 4th & Butternut", although Wilson was not credited.

In Los Angeles, Wilson met fellow blues enthusiast and record collector Bob "The Bear" Hite at a record store. Together they founded Canned Heat in 1965. The band's name was taken from Tommy Johnson's 1928 song "Canned Heat Blues", about an alcoholic who turned to drinking the cooking fuel Sterno. Originally beginning as a jug band, Canned Heat initially consisted of Hite on vocals, Wilson on bottleneck guitar, Mike Perlowin on lead guitar, Stu Brotman on bass, and Keith Sawyer on drums. The group landed gigs at the Ash Grove in Hollywood, and, after Perlowin dropped out, Hite invited his friend Henry "The Sunflower" Vestine, from Frank Zappa's Mothers of Invention, to join on guitar.

Johnny Otis produced the group's first full-length album in 1966. It featured Hite, Wilson, Vestine, Brotman, and new drummer Frank Cook in Otis's studio just off Vine Street in Los Angeles. The record was not released until 1970, and Vintage, as it was titled, has since become the most repackaged and bootlegged record in Canned Heat's discography. Over a summer hiatus, Brotman left Canned Heat and was replaced by Larry "The Mole" Taylor, an experienced session musician who had played with Jerry Lee Lewis and The Monkees.

Canned Heat's first year was marked by infrequent gigs and public indifference. Wilson later told Melody Maker, "The first year we were together, we worked for three weeks. We'd get a gig, play three days and get fired ... because we refused to be a human jukebox." After a particularly disastrous engagement, the group briefly disbanded in August 1966. Wilson and Vestine moved on to join the Electric Beavers, an ensemble featuring a full horn section. The band lasted for a short time on a rehearsal basis only. Canned Heat re-formed in November 1966. During a gig at the Ash Grove, Canned Heat earned the attention of singer-songwriter Jackie DeShannon, who was married to the head of A&R at Liberty Records, Bud Dain.

In July 1967, the band released their first album, Canned Heat, featuring reworkings of older blues songs, for Liberty Records. Their first big live performance was on June 17, 1967, at the Monterey Pop Festival, where they performed renditions of "Rollin and Tumblin", "Bullfrog Blues", and "Dust My Broom". DownBeat praised the band's performance: "Technically, Vestine and Wilson are quite possibly the best two-guitar team in the world and Wilson has certainly become our finest white blues harmonica man."

Wilson wrote and sang the band's break-out hit, "On the Road Again", an updated version of a 1950s composition by Floyd Jones, on the band's second album, Boogie with Canned Heat. In an interview with DownBeat, Wilson remarked, "...on 'On the Road Again' I appear in six different capacities – three tamboura parts, harmonica, vocal, and guitar, all recorded at different times." "On the Road Again" peaked at number 16 on the Billboard Hot 100, and at number 8 on the UK singles charts, which signified the band's popularity in Europe. Drummer Frank Cook left the band in December 1967 and was replaced by Adolfo "Fito" de la Parra.

Canned Heat's third album, Living the Blues, included the band's best-known song, also sung by Wilson, "Going Up the Country". The song, an incarnation of Henry Thomas' "Bull-Doze Blues", was rewritten by Wilson and caught the "back to nature" attitude of the late 1960s. The tune was a hit in numerous countries around the world, peaking at number 11 in the US. The "rural hippie anthem" became the unofficial theme song for the Woodstock Festival where Canned Heat performed at sunset on August 16, 1969. Although Canned Heat's live performance was cut from the original theatrical release of the Woodstock film, they were featured in the 25th-anniversary "Director's Cut". The studio version of "Going Up the Country" was featured in the Woodstock film; and in recent years has been heard in television commercials for Geico Insurance, Subaru, and Pepsi.

Around this time, Wilson became disillusioned with Canned Heat and considered quitting the band on several occasions. Upset over Vestine's departure in July 1969 and becoming more averse to touring, Wilson expressed the possibility of still recording but not touring with the band. Wilson arranged to join Vestine's new band Sunn, and Frank Cook's group Pacific Gas and Electric; however, both options fell through. Eventually, Wilson ended up leaving Canned Heat for about two weeks in late 1969 and again shortly before his death in 1970. But each time, he felt guilty and decided to return and tour again. His increasing isolation became obvious, as footage of the band at this time showed Wilson standing apart from his bandmates, and often hiding behind rows of amps.

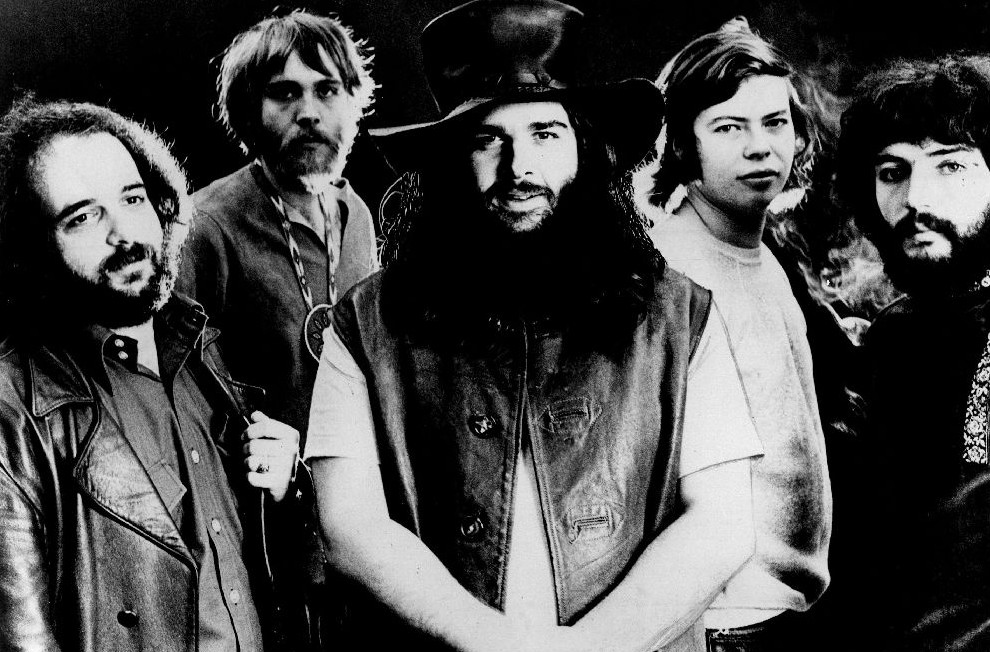
Wilson (second from right) with Canned Heat in 1970

Canned Heat's fifth album, Future Blues, was released in August 1970 and featured the Wilbert Harrison cover of "Let's Work Together". It became their biggest hit in the UK, reaching number 2 on the Singles Chart for 15 weeks. The cover features the band dressed as astronauts on the Moon, mocking the flag-raising on Iwo Jima. The upside-down American flag was Wilson's idea in response to America's social distress at the time, and his concern over the first Moon landing a year before. However, retailers like Sears and K-Mart found the cover offensive and refused to stock the album.

In May 1970, Canned Heat teamed up with John Lee Hooker, fulfilling a dream of Wilson's of recording with one of his musical idols. It would be Wilson's last recording. The resulting double album, Hooker 'N' Heat, was the first in Hooker's career to make the charts. On the album, Hooker is heard wondering how Wilson was capable of following his guitar playing so well. Hooker was known to be a difficult performer to accompany, partly because of his disregard of song form, yet Wilson seemed to have no trouble at all following him on this album. Hooker states that "you [Wilson] musta been listenin' to my records all your life" and also stated that Wilson was the "greatest harmonica player ever". Released after Wilson's death, the album cover features a framed photo of Wilson on the wall behind the rest of Canned Heat.

On a night off in Britain on June 30, 1970, Wilson went to see his old friend Son House, who was performing at the 100 Club in London. He sat in for "Between Midnight and Day" and "I Want to Go Home on the Morning Train". The show was recorded and originally released as John The Revelator on Liberty in 1970. The session was a concept album with House narrating through his last European performance in a biblical format. It was reissued in 1995 with extensive liner notes by David Evans as Delta Blues and Spirituals on Capitol Records and was posthumously dedicated to Wilson.

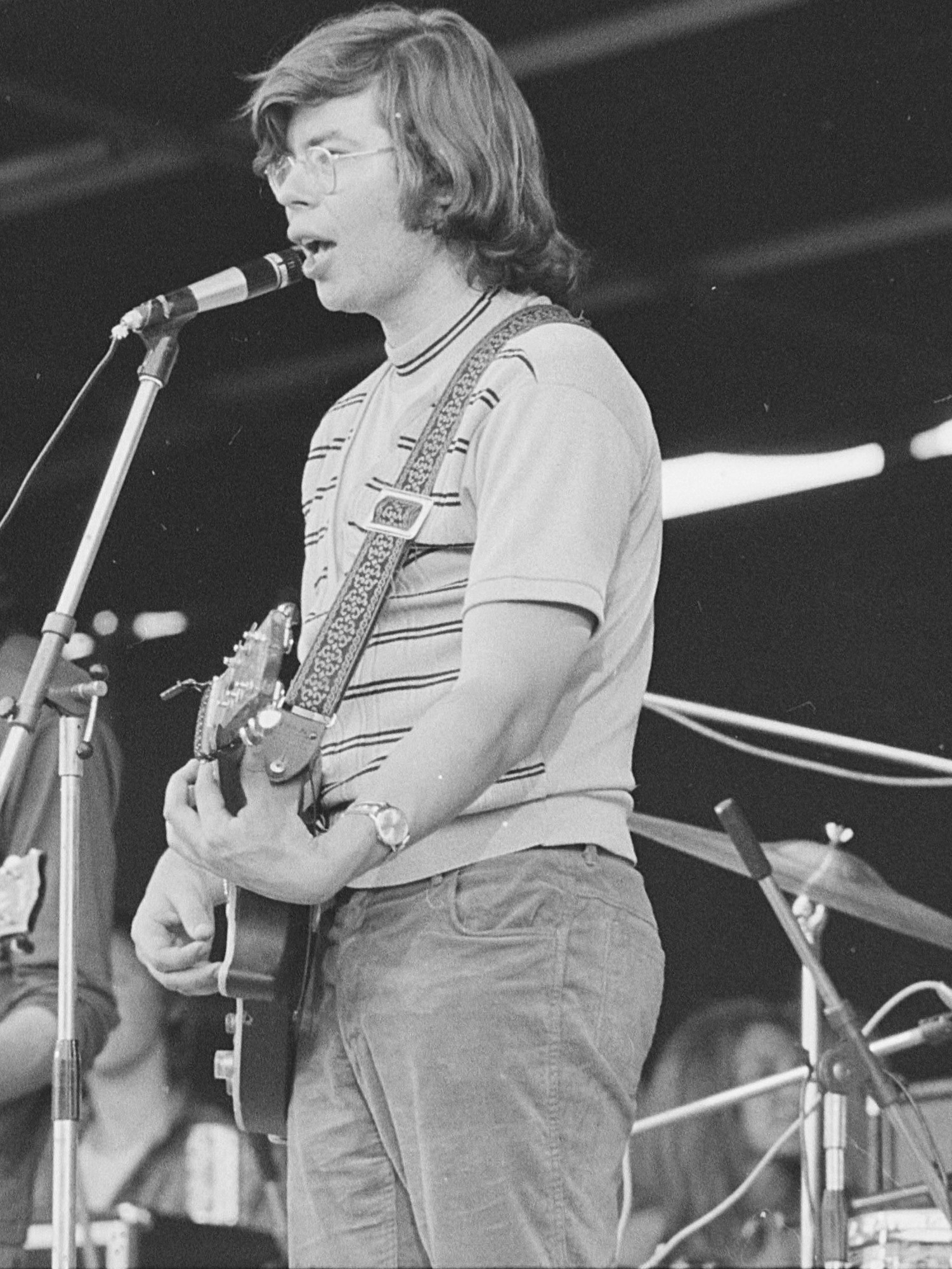
Wilson performing with Canned Heat at the Kralingen Music Festival

The last live footage of Wilson was taken at Canned Heat's performance at the Kralingen Music Festival, Rotterdam, Netherlands, on June 26, 1970.

Wilson appeared with Canned Heat performing "One Kind Favor" during a party scene in the film The Naked Zoo, which was released in 1971.

== Personal life ==
Wilson suffered from anxiety and depression, rooted in his personal issues and in his despair over the environment. According to his bandmates, Wilson's personal hygiene was atrocious; he had to be frequently reminded to bathe, brush his teeth and change clothes. Some sources state that Wilson attempted suicide multiple times; others say he never actually said he tried to commit suicide and these were simply assumptions made after his death by some who knew him. As a child, Wilson frequently experienced frightening episodes of sleep paralysis and later suffered from insomnia as an adult. To resolve his insomnia, Wilson started using the barbiturate Secobarbital, or "reds" as they were known on the street. He had a nervous habit of pulling and twisting his hair. In the summer of 1969, Wilson was hospitalized for depression. During this time, he wrote the song "Poor Moon", expressing his concern for pollution from the Moon landing that same year. In order to be released, Wilson was placed under Bob Hite's care in a legal custody agreement. Wilson was hospitalized again in the spring of 1970, as Canned Heat was scheduled to record an album with John Lee Hooker. Wilson reportedly attempted to drive his car off a freeway in Los Angeles, sustaining an injury to the top of his head. There are conflicting stories of this incident as some claim it was an accident due to his poor eyesight and lack of driving experience; Wilson was permitted to attend recording sessions, but would return to the hospital at the conclusion of each session. His song "Human Condition" reflects an encounter with his psychiatrist during one of his hospital stays.

Due to his poor vision, Wilson did not learn how to drive until 1969, when Hite gave him a camper van which doubled as a home. Wilson had no interest in purchasing a home and whenever Canned Heat was not on tour, he would camp at Yosemite or Sequoia National Park in his van at every opportunity.

== Death ==
On September 2, 1970, Canned Heat was scheduled to leave for Germany to begin a European tour. Due to his anxiety and depression, Wilson disliked touring and had a marked fear of flying, often failing to show up for flights; the rest of the band would fly without him, while he caught a later flight. When Wilson missed the September 2 flight to Germany, the band was not particularly concerned. On September 3, 1970, Wilson was found dead in his sleeping bag on the hillside behind Hite's Topanga Canyon home where he often slept. An autopsy listed the official cause of death as accidental acute barbiturate intoxication, although Wilson's death is sometimes reported to be a suicide. He left no suicide note.

Wilson's body was cremated, and on September 13, 1970, a memorial service was held at Menotomy Rocks Park in his hometown of Arlington, Massachusetts. The service was led by Reverend Wilbur Canaday who said, "We are using the sky as a roof, and the ground as a floor, because he himself used nature's great wonders as his home." Wilson's ashes were later scattered in Sequoia National Park, amongst the redwood trees he deeply loved.

== Conservationism ==
Wilson was a passionate conservationist who loved reading books on botany and ecology. He often slept outdoors to be closer to nature and amassed a large collection of pinecones. He believed that trees were sentient beings that could experience pain. In 1969, he wrote and recorded a song, "Poor Moon", which expressed concern over potential pollution of the Moon. Wilson's clothes were often dirty and disheveled from collecting leaf and soil samples outdoors. On one occasion in 1967, Canned Heat's hotel room was raided by the police in a drugs sting, but Wilson avoided arrest as he was out collecting leaves and soil. In 1970, Wilson established a conservation fund called Music Mountain Foundation, to purchase a grove to be added to Redwood National Park. The purpose of this organization was to raise money for the preservation of the coastal redwood, which Wilson saw increasingly endangered by pollution and urban sprawl. Canned Heat, along with their manager, agreed to donate proceeds from major concerts after Wilson's death; however, it was later discovered that the funds had been misappropriated. Wilson wrote an essay called "Grim Harvest", expressing his concern for the logging of redwoods, which was printed as the liner notes to Future Blues. It begins, "The redwoods of California are the tallest living things on Earth, nearly the oldest, and among the most beautiful to boot." It ends with a plea to "prevent Future Blues" by making a donation to his organization.

In 1969, Wilson briefly worked as an ecological consultant for the United States Forest Service. He was appointed to conduct a study on how rising levels of pollution would affect plant life on Earth, and then to determine which species could survive if pollution levels continued to rise at the rates at the time. During his studies, Wilson was even credited with discovering two new species of trees in the Pacific Northwest. When Wilson finished the study, he concluded that nothing could survive.

In order to support his dream, Wilson's family purchased, through the Save the Redwoods League of California, a "grove naming" in his memory. The funds donated to create this memorial would be used by the League to support redwood reforestation, research, education, and land acquisition of both new and old growth redwoods.

== Legacy ==
Wilson is widely remembered as a pioneer of blues-rock during its crucial development period of the 1960s and as a promoter of the revival of early Delta Blues. Wilson was considered by many of his musical peers to be an expert on the blues musicians who came before him; many considered him as possessing an exceptional ability for connecting musically with the elder bluesmen.

He was a gifted slide guitarist, harmonica player, songwriter, and vocalist. Mike Bloomfield of the Paul Butterfield Blues Band introduced him to Charlie Musselwhite as "the best goddamn harp player there is. He can do things that you've never heard before."

His recording career spanned only three years; despite this, he left behind a rich legacy of inspiration to fellow artists, music scholars, and listeners alike. Wilson's friend John Fahey has said that he was "among the most significant influences on my musicianship", and that his work "must be appreciated for its immortal, spellbinding beauty." Stephen Stills's song "Blues Man", from the album Manassas, is dedicated to Wilson, along with Jimi Hendrix and Duane Allman.

== Equipment ==
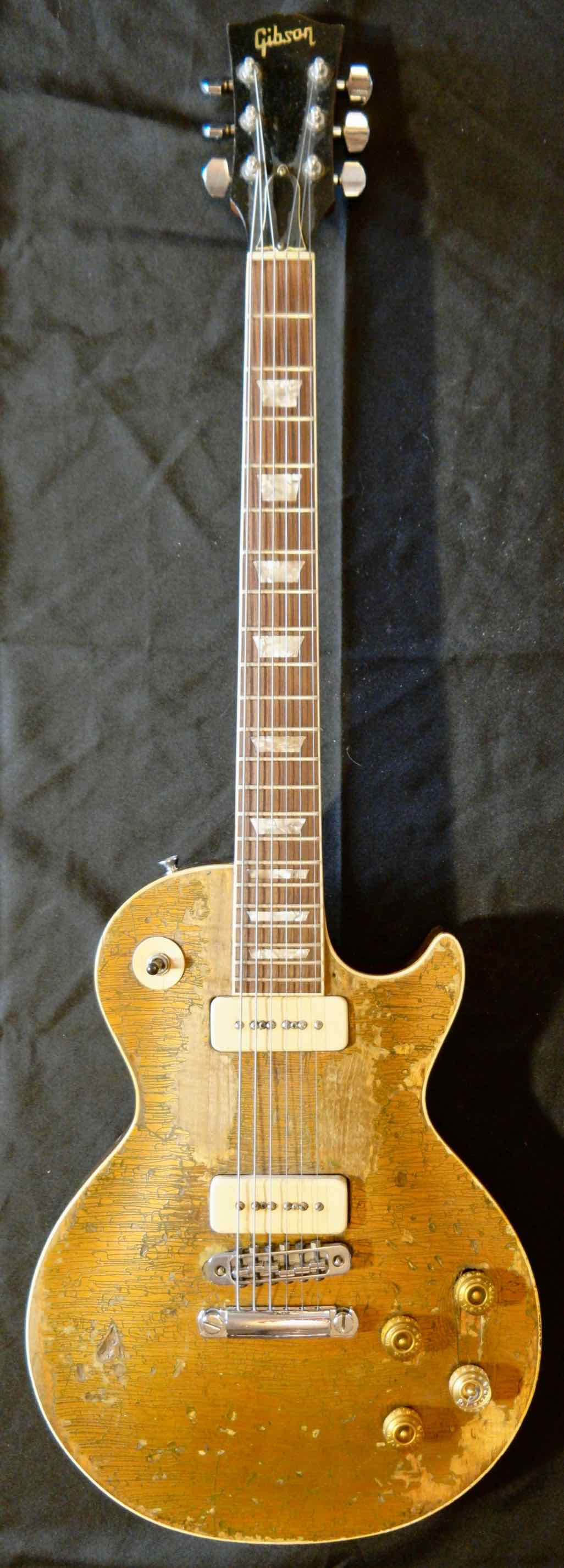
Wilson's 1954 Les Paul Goldtop with an improved two-part tailpiece

Wilson played a variety of guitars, but his main choice was a 1954 Gibson Les Paul Goldtop. A 1960s white Fender Mustang was used during Canned Heat's performance at the 1967 Monterey Pop Festival. For promotional and mimed performances on various local and European television dance shows, Wilson often used a late-1960s blond Fender Telecaster. It is believed Wilson did not own this guitar, and it may only have been provided to him as a prop. During a live performance on Playboy After Dark, Wilson is seen playing a late-1960s cherry Gibson ES-335.

Wilson's mainstay Les Paul Goldtop was not a factory stock model. The stock tuners were replaced sometime prior to Woodstock with modern Grover tuners, as the stock tuning pegs at the time did not keep the instrument in tune as well as in later models. In addition, the pick guard and bracket were removed to provide room for his finger-picking style. The model had a stoptail bridge (an adjustable fixed-bridge piece and a separate stopbar or tailpiece) that provided both string support and intonation in one unit. It also featured Gibson P-90 single-coil pickups. Both of these latter features were keys to Wilson's tone.

== Accolades ==
- Blues Hall of Fame: Legendary Blues Artist Inductee, July 19, 2013
- The Music Museum of New England Inductee

== Discography ==
- Father of the Delta Blues: The Complete 1965 Sessions, w/ Son House 1965
- The Great San Bernardino Birthday Party & Other Excursions, w/ John Fahey 1966
- Fred Neil w/ Fred Neil 1967, Capitol Records
- Slim's Got His Thing Going On w/ Sunnyland Slim, 1969 World Pacific Records
- John The Revelator: The 1970 London Sessions w/ Son House, 1970, Vequel Records (re-released in 1995 on Capitol Records as Delta Blues and Spirituals)
- Alan Wilson: The Blind Owl, 2013 (2 CD Severn Records)
