= Pony Blues =

1929 song by Charley Patton

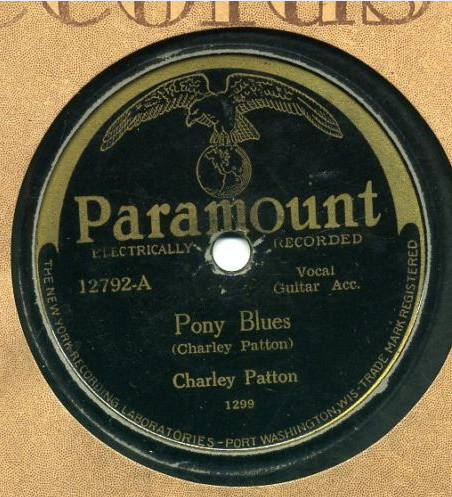

Single by Charley Patton
- B-side: "Banty Rooster Blues"
- Released: Late 1929
- Recorded: Richmond, Indiana, June 14, 1929
- Genre: Delta blues
- Length: 3:02
- Label: Paramount (no. 12792-A)
- Songwriter: Charley Patton

Charley Patton singles chronology
"Pony Blues" (1929)	""Prayer of Death" (Parts 1 & 2)" (1929)

"Pony Blues" is a Delta blues song recorded by blues musician Charley Patton. Patton recorded the song in June 1929 during his first session. The song was also the first song to be released by Patton on the Paramount label.

== Recording and background ==
Patton wrote "Pony Blues" sometime around the age 19, and is one of the first songs Patton ever wrote. He would record another rendition of this song as "Stone Pony Blues" in 1934.

With the help of record store owner H. C. Speir, Patton obtained his first recording session, for Paramount Records, on June 14, 1929. He cut 14 sides, including "Pony Blues" (vocal and guitar). Patton's composition "Down the Dirt Road" was also recorded at this session.

== Renditions ==
- Big Joe Williams: Classic Delta Blues (1966)
- Canned Heat: Living the Blues (1968)
- Son House: The Great Bluesmen at Newport (1976)
- Cephas & Wiggins: Goin' Down the Road Feelin' Bad (1998)
- Howlin' Wolf: The Best of Howlin' Wolf 1951-1958 (1990)
- Corey Harris: Between Midnight and Day (1995)
- Alvin Youngblood Hart: Big Mama's Door (1996)
- Duke Robillard: New Blues for Modern Man (1999)
- Paul Geremia: Love, Murder & Mosquitos (2004)
