= Wilbert Harrison =

American rhythm and blues musician (1929–1994)

Background information
- Born: Wilbert Huntington Harrison; January 5, 1929; Charlotte, North Carolina, U.S.
- Died: October 26, 1994 (aged 65) Spencer, North Carolina, U.S.
- Genres: Rhythm and blues
- Occupations: Singer; musician
- Instruments: Vocals; guitar; keyboards
- Years active: 1950–1990
- Labels: Savoy; Sue; Fury; Sphere Sound; Juggernaut; Chelsea

Wilbert Huntington Harrison (January 5, 1929 – October 26, 1994) was an American rhythm and blues singer, pianist, guitarist, and harmonica player.

== Biography ==
Harrison was born in Charlotte, North Carolina. He had a Billboard number-one record in 1959 with the song "Kansas City". The song was written in 1952 and was one of the first credited collaborations by the team of Jerry Leiber and Mike Stoller. It sold over one million copies, and was awarded a gold disc. Harrison recorded "Kansas City" for the Harlem-based entrepreneur Bobby Robinson, who released it on his Fury record label.

At the height of the song's success, Robinson was sued by Savoy Records, which informed them that the release of the record in March 1959 violated a contract Harrison had with that label that was to expire in August 1959. The litigation, which lasted until September 1959, abruptly prevented Robinson from issuing follow-ups to "Kansas City", while Harrison was a star.

Meanwhile, Harrison continued to perform and record, but another 10 years passed before he again cracked the Billboard Top 40 when he released the self-penned "Let's Work Together (Part 1)" that went to number 32 in early 1970 on the Billboard Hot 100. The 1970 hit version was released as a single on Sue Records (Sue 11) and was backed with "Let's Work Together (Part 2)". The song also was released in a 5-minute, 19-second version on the Sue Records album SSLP-8801 Let's Work Together. The song was originally released by Harrison in 1962 with different lyrics as "Let's Stick Together" on Fury 1059 and Fury 1063.

"Let's Work Together" was later a hit for Canned Heat and again as "Let's Stick Together", for Bryan Ferry. It was also recorded by country rock band the Kentucky Headhunters for the soundtrack to the movie Harley Davidson and the Marlboro Man.

In 1970, Harrison had some success with "My Heart Is Yours", and he toured for many years with a band known as Wilbert Harrison and the Roamers, and as a solo act. A follow-up album was released that year, Anything You Want. Reviewing it in Christgau's Record Guide: Rock Albums of the Seventies (1981), Robert Christgau wrote:

"Let's Work Together was an anachronistic, even primitive R&B [rhythm and blues] album based on the fluke hit of the same name, which makes this the follow-up. Side one consists entirely of roll and rock songs you'd swear you've heard before—'Your Three Letters,' eh, and what's this 'Let's Stick Together,' and why not bring out 'Kansas City' again? Very unprepossessing, very charming. In fact, if the second side weren't all standards and uncharming filler—only 'Sentimental Journey' is even funny—I wouldn't be recommending this to R&B diehards only."

Harrison died of a stroke in 1994, in a Spencer, North Carolina, nursing home at the age of 65.

In 2001, his recording of "Kansas City" was given a Grammy Hall of Fame Award, and has also been named as one of the Rock and Roll Hall of Fame's 500 Songs that Shaped Rock and Roll. Harrison was inducted into the North Carolina Music Hall of Fame in 2009.
