= Henry Vestine =

American blues rock guitarist (1944–1997)

- Vestine with Canned Heat, late 1960s

Background information
- Also known as: The Sunflower
- Born: Henry Charles Vestine; December 25, 1944; Takoma Park, Maryland, U.S.
- Died: October 20, 1997 (aged 52) Paris, France
- Genre: Blues rock
- Occupation: Guitarist
- Years active: 1965–1997
- Formerly of: Canned Heat
- Website: vipertoons.com/henry

Henry Charles Vestine (December 25, 1944 – October 20, 1997), a.k.a. "The Sunflower", was an American guitarist primarily known as a member of the blues rock band Canned Heat. He was with the group from its start in 1965 to July 1969. In later years, he played in local bands but occasionally returned to Canned Heat for a few tours and recordings.

In 2003, Vestine was ranked 77th in Rolling Stone magazine list of the "100 Greatest Guitarists of All Time".

== Biography ==
=== Family ===
Born in Takoma Park, Maryland, Vestine was the only son of Harry and Lois Vestine. His father was a noted geophysicist and meteorologist. The Vestine Crater on the Moon had been named posthumously after his father who discovered it.

Henry Vestine married Lisa Lack, with whom he moved to Anderson, South Carolina. In 1980, they had a son, Jesse. In 1983, they separated and Vestine moved to Oregon.

Vestine's love of music and the blues in particular was fostered at an early age when he accompanied his father on canvasses of black neighborhoods for old recordings. Like his father, Vestine became an avid collector, eventually owning tens of thousands of recordings of blues, hillbilly, country, and Cajun music. At Vestine's urging, his father also used to take him to blues shows at which he and Henry were often the only white people present. Later Vestine was instrumental in the "rediscovery" of Skip James and other Delta musicians.

=== Training ===
In the mid-1950s, Vestine and his childhood friend from Takoma Park, John Fahey, began to learn how to play guitar and sang a mixed bag of pop, hillbilly, and country music, particularly Hank Williams. Soon after the family moved to California, Vestine joined his first junior high band Hial King and the Newports. On his first acid trip with a close musician friend, he went to an East LA tattoo parlor and got the first of what was to be numerous tattoos: the words "Living The Blues". Later, in 1969, that became the title of a double album by Canned Heat. By the time he was seventeen he was a regular on the Los Angeles club circuit. He became a familiar sight at many black clubs, where he often brought musician friends to turn them on to the blues. Vestine became friends with Cajun guitarist Jerry McGhee. It was from him that Vestine learned and adopted the flat pick and three-finger style. He was an early fan of Roy Buchanan and his favorite guitar players included T-Bone Walker, Johnny "Guitar" Watson, Sonny Sharrock, Freddie King, and Albert Collins. In Canned Heat he was able to play and record with John Lee Hooker whom he had admired since the late 1950s.

=== 1960s ===
Throughout the early to mid-1960s, Vestine played in various musical configurations and eventually was hired by Frank Zappa for the original Mothers of Invention in late October 1965. Vestine was in the Mothers for only a few months and left before they recorded their debut album. Demo tapes from Mothers of Invention rehearsal sessions featuring Vestine (recorded in November 1965) appear on the Frank Zappa album Joe's Corsage, posthumously released in 2004.

His friend Fahey was instrumental in the formation of Canned Heat. He had introduced Al Wilson, whom he knew from Boston, to Vestine and Bob and Richard Hite. Wilson, Vestine and the Hite brothers formed a jug band that rehearsed at Don Brown's Jazz Man record Shop. Bob Hite and Alan Wilson started Canned Heat with Kenny Edwards as a second guitarist, but Vestine was asked to join. The first notable appearance of the band was the following year when they played at the Monterey Pop Festival. Shortly after Canned Heat's first album was released, Vestine burst into musical prominence as a guitarist who stretched the idiom of the blues with long solos that moved beyond the conventional genres. He had his own style and a trademark piercing treble guitar sound.

Vestine missed playing at the Woodstock Festival in 1969, having quit the band the previous week. In 1995, he explained to an Australian reporter that "[a]t the time, it was just another gig. It was too bad I wasn't there, but I just couldn't continue with the band at the time." There had been some tension between him and bassist Larry Taylor. When Taylor quit Canned Heat, Vestine returned; their alternating membership in the band was to be repeated a few more times over the years.

While Canned Heat played at Woodstock in August 1969, Vestine was invited to New York City for session work with avant-garde jazz musician Albert Ayler. That session work resulted in two releases on the Impulse label: Music Is the Healing Force of the Universe and The Last Album (both released 1969).

According to Canned Heat drummer Adolpho "Fito" de la Parra, Vestine frequently used methamphetamine and heroin during his tenure with the band. Combined with other band members' substance abuse, this created difficulties for the group. During this period Vestine also developed an intense interest in Harley Davidson motorcycles. He eventually owned eleven of them. Prior to his death he was looking forward to playing at their 75th Anniversary Celebration. Over the years he had also a close relationship with the Hells Angels.

=== 1970s ===
Through the 1970s gradually Canned Heat had become a part-time occupation with occasional gigs and recording sessions. When Vestine's marriage broke up in 1983, he moved to Oregon. There he lived on a farm in rural Summit for a year and then in Corvallis, making a living doing odd jobs and playing music at rodeos and taverns in a country band with Mike Rosso, an old friend from southern California who had also moved to Oregon. He also played with Ramblin' Rex.

Terry Robb brought Vestine to Portland and they did some recording together. Vestine began playing with the Pete Carnes Blues Band and made his way to Eugene when the band folded in the mid-1980s. He played the regional club scene with a number of blues and blues-rock groups including James T. and The Tough. From that band he was to bring James Thornbury to a reconstituted Canned Heat.

Vestine toured with Canned Heat in Australia and Europe, where the band had a popularity that far surpassed the recognition they got in the United States. When he returned to Eugene he would play with The Vipers, a group of veteran Eugene blues musicians who perform throughout the Northwest. He continued to record including sessions with Oregon bands such as Skip Jones and The Rent Party Band, Terry Robb, and The Vipers. He also recorded the album Guitar Gangster with Evan Johns in Austin.

=== Death ===
Vestine had finished a European tour with Canned Heat when he died from heart and respiratory failure in a Paris hotel on the morning of October 20, 1997, just as the band was awaiting return to the United States.

Henry Vestine's ashes are interred at the Oak Hill Cemetery outside of Eugene, Oregon. A memorial fund has been set up in his name. The fund will be used for maintenance of his resting place at Oak Hill Cemetery and, when it is possible, for conveyance of some of his ashes to the Vestine Crater on the Moon.

== See also ==
- List of Swedish Americans
