= Don and Dewey =

American rock/blues/R&B duo

- Origin: Los Angeles, California, U.S.
- Genres: R&B, rock and roll
- Years active: 1956–1964, 1975–1999
- Label: Specialty Records
- Past members: Don "Sugarcane" Harris; Dewey Terry

Don and Dewey were an American rock, blues, and R&B duo, comprising Don "Sugarcane" Harris (Don Francis Bowman Harris; June 18, 1938 – December 1, 1999) and Dewey Terry (Dewey Steven Terry; July 17, 1937 – May 11, 2003).

== History ==
Both Harris and Terry were born in Los Angeles and grew up in Pasadena, California. As children, Terry learned piano and sang in a choir, while Harris learned classical violin. They met in 1949 when Terry heard Harris practicing guitar, and at high school formed a doo-wop vocal group, the Squires, with their friends. The group performed together and made several recordings in the mid-1950s for small local record labels, including Dig This Record.

The group split up in 1956, but Harris and Terry continued to perform together, and made their first recordings as a duo for the Shade label. By this time, Harris played electric violin, and Terry played piano and bass. They were signed by Art Rupe's Specialty Records label and for the next two years produced rock and roll. Both Don and Dewey played guitar, with Dewey often doubling on keyboards. When not playing guitar or bass, Don occasionally played the electric violin, a skill for which he subsequently became well known under the name of "Sugarcane" Harris. Drummer Earl Palmer played frequently on their sessions.

Although Don and Dewey did not have any hits of their own, several of the songs that they wrote and/or recorded would appear on the charts later, performed by other artists. "I'm Leaving It Up to You" became a #1 hit for Dale & Grace in 1963. "Farmer John" was a hit by The Premiers, reaching #19 in 1964, a year after The Searchers released their own version. "Koko Joe" (written by the then-Specialty Records producer Sonny Bono), "Justine" and "Big Boy Pete" were staples for The Righteous Brothers for many years. "Big Boy Pete" became a minor hit in 1960 for The Olympics, reaching #50 and a #4 hit for The Kingsmen when recorded with new lyrics as "The Jolly Green Giant" in 1965.

In 1959 Don and Dewey and producer Sonny Bono left Specialty Records for Rush Records, where they recorded a few songs but split up shortly afterward.

In 1964 Art Rupe recorded both Don and Dewey and Little Richard (another Specialty Records act) but there would be no further hits for either act, following their collaborative "Bama Lama, Bama Loo "/"Annie's Back"; by 1965 they went their separate ways. Their working relationship also yielded a successful (mostly overseas) comeback album for Richard and a tour of Europe. The BBC captured the act in Paris on June 6, 1964. Don and Dewey began to perform together again occasionally in the mid-1970s, and continued to do so until Harris's death.

== Separate careers ==
In the late 1960s, Harris featured on recordings with Johnny Otis of The Johnny Otis Show, and John Mayall's Bluesbreakers. In 1970, as Sugarcane Harris, he re-emerged to a wider rock audience, playing violin on the Hot Rats solo album by Frank Zappa, with Captain Beefheart (vocals) on "Willie The Pimp" and on the lengthy instrumental jam, "The Gumbo Variations". and in later years, went on to play on several more solo, Zappa, and The Mothers of Invention albums. Terry continued to perform and record with blues musicians until his death in 2003.

== The Pure Food and Drug Act ==
In 1969, Sugarcane Harris, with the help of Los Angeles drummer Paul Lagos, assembled a band with bassist Larry Taylor and guitarist Randy Resnick. Initially, the band was called "The Sugarcane Harris Band". In 1972, after a few years of concerts in and around Los Angeles, the band recorded the live album, "Fresh Cuts", in Seattle at the Fresh Air Tavern for Epic Records with his band, Pure Food & Drug Act. The original lineup of the band featured Sugarcane, Larry Taylor, Paul Lagos and Randy Resnick. Victor Conte was brought in on bass when Larry Taylor quit. Harvey Mandel, longtime Mayall guitarist and friend of Taylor, joined just before the album was recorded. The band toured the United States and Canada.

Sugarcane continued to record and perform live over the years sometimes with Dewey Terry and with Randy Resnick in the late 1970s.

Harris died in 1999.

== Tribute ==
"Don and Dewey" is the title of an instrumental by the band It's a Beautiful Day. It is the first track of their 1970 album Marrying Maiden. The band featured a violin, which may have been the inspiration to write this piece. This tune by It's a Beautiful Day pays homage to Don & Dewey as the main riff borrows directly from their tune "Stretchin' Out," credited to Don and Dewy [sic] (Rush R-1002). Deep Purple also used this riff in their instrumental "Wring That Neck" ("Hard Road" in the United States).
