= Never Get Out of These Blues Alive =

Studio album by John Lee Hooker
- Released: 1972
- Recorded: September 28–29, 1971
- Studio: Wally Heider Studios, San Francisco
- Genre: Country blues, Delta blues, Detroit blues
- Length: 39:50
- Label: ABC
- Producer: Ed Michel

John Lee Hooker chronology
Kabuki Wuki (1971)	Never Get Out of These Blues Alive (1972)	Live at Soledad Prison (1972)

Professional ratings
Review scores
Source	Rating
AllMusic	3/5 stars
Christgau's Record Guide	A−

Never Get Out of These Blues Alive is a studio album by American blues musician John Lee Hooker, released in 1972 by ABC Records and recorded on September 28–29, 1971.

== Background ==
The album features Van Morrison, Elvin Bishop, Charlie Musselwhite, and British organist Steve Miller. The album was re-released in 1987 by See For Miles Records with four additional tracks, including two with Hooker's cousin Earl Hooker on slide guitar.

== Artwork ==
The Artwork was taken on the bus.

== Track listing ==
All songs written by Hooker, except noted.

1. "Bumblebee, Bumblebee" – 4:12
2. "Hit the Road" – 2:57
3. "Country Boy – 6:59
4. "Boogie with the Hook" – 6:32
5. "T.B. Sheets" (Hooker, Van Morrison) – 4:58
6. "Letter to My Baby" – 3:57
7. "Never Get Out of These Blues Alive" – 10:15

Additional tracks on the version by See For Miles Records (1987)

1. "If You'll Take Care of Me, I'll Take Care of You" – 3:42
2. "(I Got) A Good 'Un" – 3:26
3. "Baby I Love You" – 3:15
4. "Lonesome Mood" – 4:51

== Personnel ==
- John Lee Hooker; Guitar, Vocals
- Van Morrison; Guitar, Vocals
- Earl Hooker; Guitar
- Ray MacCarty; Guitar
- Luther Tucker; Guitar
- Paul Wood; Guitar
- Elvin Bishop; Slide guitar
- Benny Roweh; Slide guitar
- Mel Brown; Guitar, bass guitar
- John Kahn; Bass guitar
- Gino Skaggs – Bass guitar, drums
- Michael White; Violin
- Mark Naftalin; Piano
- Clifford Coulter; Electric piano
- Robert Hooker; Organ, electric piano
- Steve Miller; Organ
- Charlie Musselwhite; Harmonica
- Ron Beck; Drums
- Chuck Crimelli; Drums
- Ken Swank; Drums
- Ed Michel; Production
- Baker Bigsby; Mixing
- Ken Hopkins; Engineer
- Rick Stanley; Assistant Engineer
- Philip Melnick; Cover design, photography

== Charting history ==
Chart	Peak position
Billboard Top Jazz Albums	130
