= Cristo Redentor (album) =

Studio album by Harvey Mandel
- Released: 1968
- Genre: Rock, jazz
- Length: 45:14
- Label: Philips
- Producer: Abe Kesh (believed to be)

Harvey Mandel chronology
Cristo Redentor (1968)	Righteous (1969)

Professional ratings
Review scores
Source	Rating
AllMusic	3/5 stars

Cristo Redentor is the debut album by Harvey Mandel. Richie Unterberger of AllMusic writes that "Mandel's debut remains his best early work." John Tobler wrote in the liner notes of the CD that Mandel "was good enough to be invited to audition for The Rolling Stones and he worked with John Mayall and Canned Heat - but it is for this Cristo Redentor album, and particularly for the utterly classic Wade in the Water that he will be remembered." This album is completely instrumental with the exception of the title track where soprano Jacqueline May Allen, joined by Carolyn Willis, Edna Wright and Julia Tillman Waters, blend their wordless voices as if another instrument.

== Track listing ==
Side one
No.	Title	Writer(s)	Length
1.	"Cristo Redentor"	Duke Pearson	3:45
2.	"Before Six"	Larry Frazier	6:25
3.	"The Lark"	Harvey Mandel; Abe Kesh	4:39
4.	"Snake"	Mandel	3:45
5.	"Long Wait"	Mandel; Barry Goldberg	2:48

Side two
No.	Title	Writer(s)	Length
1.	"Wade in the Water"	James W. Alexander; Sam Cooke	7:48
2.	"Lights Out"	Mandel	4:48
3.	"Bradley's Barn"	Mandel	3:17
4.	"You Can't Tell Me"	Mandel; Dino Valente	4:20
5.	"Nashville 1 A.M."	Mandel; Kesh	3:39
Total length:			45:14

2003 Australian reissue (Raven Records - RVCD-163)
No.	Title	Writer(s)	Length
1.	"Wade In The Water"	Alexander; Cooke	7:47
2.	"Lights Out"	Mandel	4:50
3.	"Bradley's Barn"	Mandel	3:18
4.	"You Can't Tell Me"	Mandel; Valente	4:20
5.	"Nashville 1 A.M."	Mandel; Kesh	3:40
6.	"Cristo Redentor"	Pearson	3:49
7.	"Before Six"	Frazier	6:30
8.	"The Lark"	Mandel; Kesh	4:40
9.	"Snake"	Mandel	3:48
10.	"Long Wait"	Mandel; Goldberg	2:46
11.	"Spirit of Trane" (Barry Goldberg, 1969)	Goldberg	4:03
12.	"My Time Ain't Long" (Canned Heat, 1970)	Alan Wilson	3:46
13.	"Let's Work Together" (Canned Heat, 1970)	Wilbert Harrison	2:50
14.	"That's All Right" (Canned Heat, 1970)	Jimmy Rogers	5:31
15.	"A Little Soul Food" (Pure Food and Drug Act, 1972)	Shuggie Otis; Don Harris	4:05
16.	"What Comes Around Goes Around" (Pure Food and Drug Act, 1972)	Mandel; Harris; Paul Lagos; Randy Resnick; Victor Conte	4:22
17.	"My Soul's On Fire" (Pure Food and Drug Act, 1972)	Mandel; Conte; Harris; Lagos	4:15
18.	"Which Witch Is Which" (Love, 1974)	Arthur Lee	1:57
Total length:			76:17

== Personnel ==
- Harvey Mandel - guitar
- Peter Drake - steel guitar
- Art Stavro - bass at New York sessions
- Bob Moore - bass (with help from Hargus Robbins)
- Hargus Robbins - piano, "chauffeur"
- Kenny Buttrey - drums
- Eddie Hoh - drums at New York sessions
- Chip Martin - rhythm guitar
- Bob Jones - rhythm guitar on "Snakes" and "Lights Out"
- Nick De Caro - piano on "Cristo Redentor"
- Charlie Musselwhite - harp on "The Lark" and "Long Wait"
- Barry Goldberg - organ, electric piano on "The Lark" and "Long Wait"
- Steve Miller - organ, piano on "Cristo Redentor", "Before Six" and "Wade in the Water"
- Larry Easter - tenor saxophone on "Before Six"
- Armando Peraza - conga on "Wade in the Water"
- Carter C.C. Collins - conga on "Before Six"
- Grahame Bond - piano on "You Can't Tell Me" (credited on rear cover but the song isn't listed or included on the album)
- Jacqueline May Allen (Soprano), Carolyn Willis, Edna Wright, Julia Tillman Waters - voices on "Cristo Redentor"
- Catherine Gotthofer - harp on "Cristo Redentor"
- Nick De Caro, Steve Miller and Larry Easter - string and horn arrangements

== Production ==
- Producer on Tracks 1–10: Believed to be Abe Kesh
- Producer on Track 11: Lewis Merenstein and Barry Goldberg
- Producer on Track 12–13: Skip Taylor and Canned Heat
- Producer on Track 14: Skip Taylor and Jim Taylor
- Producer on Tracks 15–17: Skip Taylor
- Producer on Track 18: Skip Taylor assisted by John Stronach and Arthur Lee

LP track order was taken from the original vinyl record. All other track information and credits were taken from the CD liner notes.
