= Kabuki Wuki =

Live album by John Lee Hooker
- Released: 1973
- Recorded: August 14, 1971
- Venue: Kabuki Theatre, San Francisco, California
- Genre: Blues
- Length: 40:35
- Label: BluesWay
- Producer: Ed Michel

John Lee Hooker chronology
Live at Soledad Prison (1972)	Kabuki Wuki (1973)	Born in Mississippi, Raised Up in Tennessee (1973)

Kabuki Wuki is a live album by blues musician John Lee Hooker recorded In California in 1971 and released by the BluesWay label in 1973.

== Reception ==
Professional ratings
Review scores
Source	Rating
AllMusic	1.5/5 stars

AllMusic reviewer Mark Allen stated: "This live set at the Kabuki Theater in San Francisco never catches fire. The great bluesman has his usual band, but he seems to be trying too hard to appeal to a young, mostly white audience that ends up too high in the mix".

== Track listing ==
All compositions credited to John Lee Hooker

1. "Your Love (Just a Little Bit)" – 5:30
2. "Hold It" – 0:46
3. "Look at the Rain" – 8:33
4. "My Best Friend" – 5:15
5. "Hit the Floor" – 5:48
6. "A Little Bit Higher" – 5:27
7. "I Wonder Why" – 4:50
8. "If You Got a Dollar" – 4:50

== Personnel ==
- John Lee Hooker – guitar, vocals
- Robert Hooker – organ
- Benny Rowe, Luther Tucker, Paul Wood – guitar
- Gino Skaggs – bass
- Ken Swank – drums
- L. C. Robinson – guitar (track 1)
