= Double Shot =

Double Shot may refer to:

- Double Shot (record label), founded in 1966 in the United States
- Double Shot (ride), a type of amusement ride manufactured by S&S Power
- "Double Shot", a 1988 song by the Residents
- A double shot of alcohol (60–90ml or 2–3 ounces), made by pouring two shots using a jigger
- A shot in cue sports, also known as a "bank shot", where the object ball is struck into a cushion before entering a pocket

== Other uses ==
- Double Shot!, a 2000 album by Snooky Pryor and Mel Brown
- DoubleShot, a 2000 James Bond spy novel by Raymond Benson
- Double-Shot, a 1966 album by Chet Baker and the Mariachi Brass
- "Double Shot (Of My Baby's Love)", a 1963 song by Dick Holler & the Holidays
- Doppio, also known as a double shot, an espresso extracted using a double filter basket in the portafilter

== See also ==
- Shot (disambiguation)
