= Art Resnick =

American jazz pianist and composer

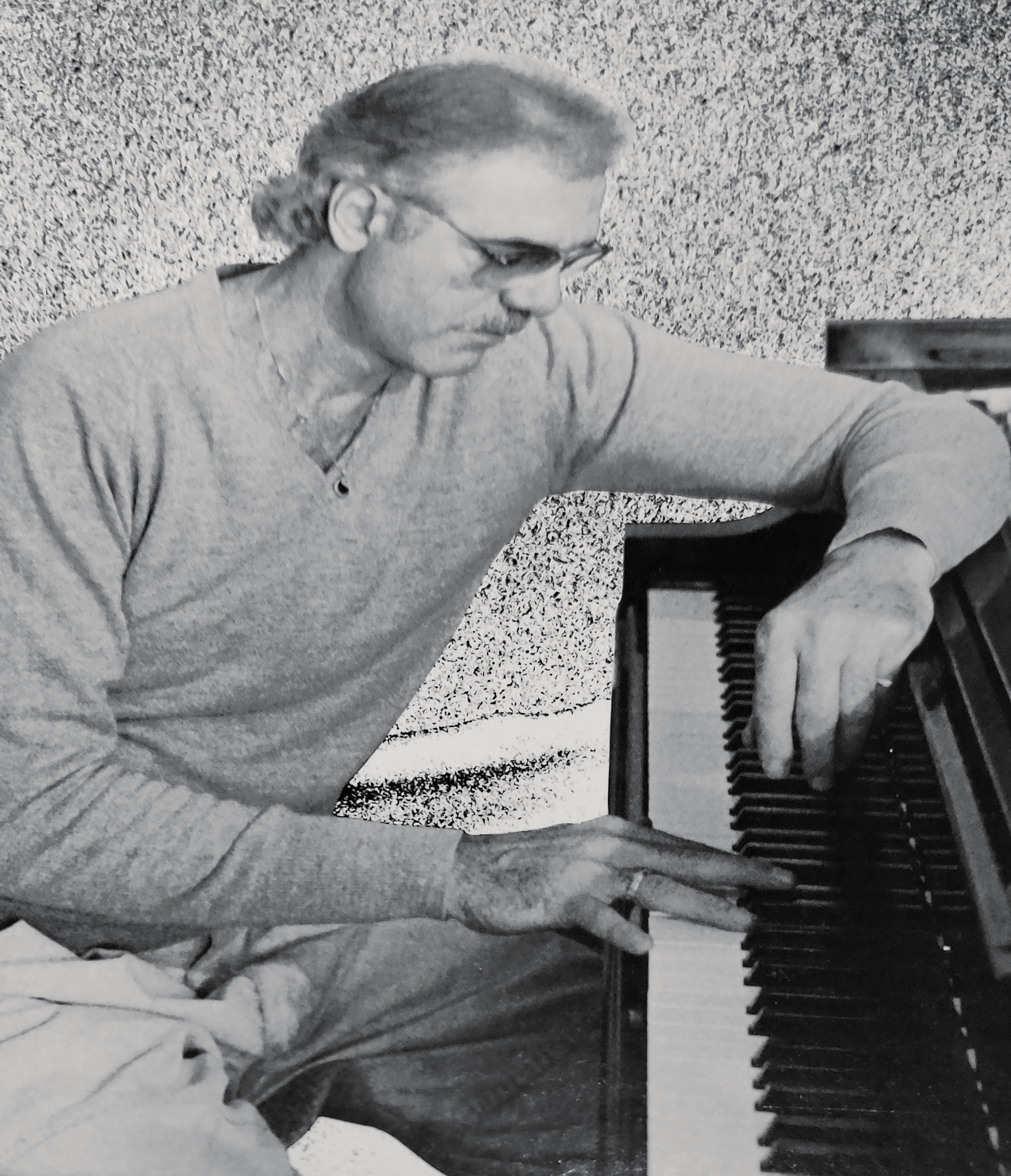
- Art Resnick

Background information
- Also known as: Art Resnick
- Born: Arthur Irwin Resnick; March 20, 1941; Minneapolis, Minnesota, United States
- Died: 26 June 2023 (aged 82) Saint Paul, Minnesota, United States
- Genres: jazz, classical
- Occupations: Musician; Composer; Arranger
- Instruments: piano, Hammond organ
- Years active: 1965–2023
- Label: Each Hit Music
- Website: https://www.eachhitmusic.com/art-resnick

Arthur "Art" Resnick was a jazz pianist and composer who toured and recorded with several jazz greats. Some of the famous musicians Resnick accompanied include Freddie Hubbard, Nat Adderley, Benny Golson, James Moody, Eddie Harris, Harry "Sweets" Edison, Bobby Shew, Hal Crook and Richie Cole. He released three albums as leader, and played on at least 13 other recordings. He performed in Europe, Australia and the US, playing in major clubs in New York, Los Angeles, Paris, Lisbon and Sydney.

== Biography ==
Arthur Irwin Resnick was born on March 20, 1941, in Minneapolis, Minnesota. He studied classical piano with Sanford Margolis. Resnick became interested in jazz and played several clubs in Minneapolis and St. Paul before heading to San Francisco in 1968. Shortly after arriving in the Bay Area, he joined a psychedelic rock band, Salvation, who frequently opened for bands like the Doors, Jefferson Airplane, and Janis Joplin. After San Francisco, his focus turned to jazz, playing and teaching in New York, San Diego, and Alaska.

In 1973, he recorded Jungleopolis, with Paul Lagos (drums), Willard Peterson (bass), and Bob Rockwell (clarinet, saxophone, flute). The album was released by UK record label, Symposium Records, in March 1975 and in the US in February 1976. Jungleopolis received a five-star review in Downbeat. This was a vibrant time for jazz in the Twin Cities and these musicians were an important part of the boom.

The same year saxophonist Irv Williams produced an album for singer Roberta Davis, featuring Resnick on piano.

He lived, taught and played in San Diego, California, accompanying guest artists like John Patitucci. Resnick helped start, and wrote some of the music for the quartet "Expedition" with Bob Rockwell, Rufus Reid and Victor Lewis. About Expedition, Rufus Reid wrote, "Art was an excellent jazz pianist, but in addition, his fantastic compositions gave us our identity. Going to Alaska and also our time in Australia was very special." Expedition co-founder Bob Rockwell called Resnick "a visionary", after listening to Jungleopolis 50 years after the recording was made.

During that time Resnick also recorded an album with drummer Kenny Horst on which he wrote one of the tracks. In 1980 Art spent a month in Australia playing with trumpeter Freddie Hubbard. The band also opened for Freddie on those shows. He played clubs in Paris, France, for about a year, and in 1990, Resnick was playing with Gary Bartz in Spain. After Paris, he moved to Portland, and recently Saint Paul.

In 1980, Resnick met saxophonist and flutist Peter Ponzol, who recalls: "Our recording, Conversations, is one of the most incredible pieces of music I have ever been part of." Ponzol goes on to tell how they met.

A friend invited me to her loft in NYC for a party, "Bring a horn; there is going to be a great pianist there" We played a few standards and I sensed that we had the right connections. I asked Art if he liked to play free. So I booked time in a studio that had a great piano and only a few days later we recorded. I was in a sound booth and could barely even see Art. The music is exactly as we recorded. Nothing was discussed. The pieces flowed and ended by themselves. The communication is on another level and I have never experienced anything like it again. People swear that most is composed.

The two also played in Germany and recorded another version of Conversations there. In 2023, the initial, previously unreleased recording of Conversations with Ponzol was released on streaming platforms.

For the release of 1, 2, 3 in 1988, the Portland Jazz Composers Ensemble wrote, "Internationally renowned pianist Art Resnick has put together a new trio with a burning young rhythm section. The story of Resnick's life and career spans many decades and several continents."

Resnick's second album, A Gift (1988) was well-received in reviews. Owen Husney's memoir about discovering and managing the musician Prince, "Famous People Who've Met Me", mentions the influence of Art and his brother Randy Resnick.

For a few years, Resnick played in the Los Angeles area with bassist Jeff Johnson, intrepid drummer Billy Mintz and influential saxophonist, John Gross. By 1991, Johnson had settled in Seattle and Resnick had relocated to Portland, Oregon, where Johnson recorded the quartet for the album My Heart. This album was finally released in 2023 as a tribute to Art when Johnson learned that his former mentor was ill. Paul Rauch wrote the following review in All About Jazz:

All things aside, Minneapolis was Johnson's primary education, where he learned from such Twin Cities stalwarts as pianist Art Resnick. As both a pianist and composer, Resnick was a deep dive into jazz harmony and ear training for the young bassist, not to mention a meter-bending composer several turns ahead of the compositional curve in jazz.

Resnick returned to the Twin Cities in 2019. He was scheduled to accompany Bobby Shew in March 2020, but the event was cancelled due to COVID-19 restrictions. On March 13, 2021, he played with trumpet player Steve Kenny in a Minnesota Community Network show called "What Would Monk Do?".

In 2021, Resnick's work was honored as a Minnesota Jazz Legend by the state of Minnesota, jazz88 RADIO and Patty Peterson.

Resnick died after a short stay in hospice care, in Saint Paul, Minnesota, on June 26, 2023. Pianist Ricky Peterson, known for his years with David Sanborn and his work with Prince, wrote "Throughout the years that I was learning, [Art Resnick] was—and always will be—one of the most prolific, creative and real piano players in the Twin Cities."

== Discography ==
=== As leader or co-leader ===
==== Art Resnick Quartet ====
- Jungleoplis - Symposium - SYS2005(1975)
- In the Heart of the Temple (digital, unreleased original, posthumous) - Each Hit Music (2023)

==== Art Resnick Trio ====
- A Gift - Capri (1988)
- 1, 2, 3 - PJCE (June 15, 2013)

==== Peter Ponzol and Art Resnick ====
- Conversations (vinyl) - View (1983)
- Conversations (digital, unreleased original, posthumous) - (2023)

=== As sideman ===
==== with Bobby Shew and Chuck Findley ====
- Trumpets no end - In & Out Records – IOR7032-2 (1984)

==== with Roberta Davis ====
- For the Record - Cookhouse CHS-7328A (1975)

==== with Kenny Horst ====
- Kenny Horst - Pulse - (1983)

==== with Nat Adderley ====
- Talkin' bout you Canon - Delos (1994)

==== with Randy Resnick and Pete Effamy ====
- Four You - Each Hit Music (2022)

==== with Jeff Johnson ====
- My Heart - Origin Records (2023)
