= High Spirits =

High Spirits may refer to:

- High Spirits (musical), a Broadway production based on the Noël Coward play Blithe Spirit
  - High Spirits (album), a 1964 recording of selections from the musical by Jamaican saxophonist Joe Harriott
- High Spirits (film), a 1988 comedy starring Peter O'Toole
- High Spirits (short story collection), a 1982 book by Robertson Davies
- High Spirits with Shirley Ghostman, a British television comedy show first broadcast in 2005
- The High Spirits, an American garage rock band active in the 1960s
