= Mel Brown (guitarist) =

American blues guitarist and singer (1939–2009)

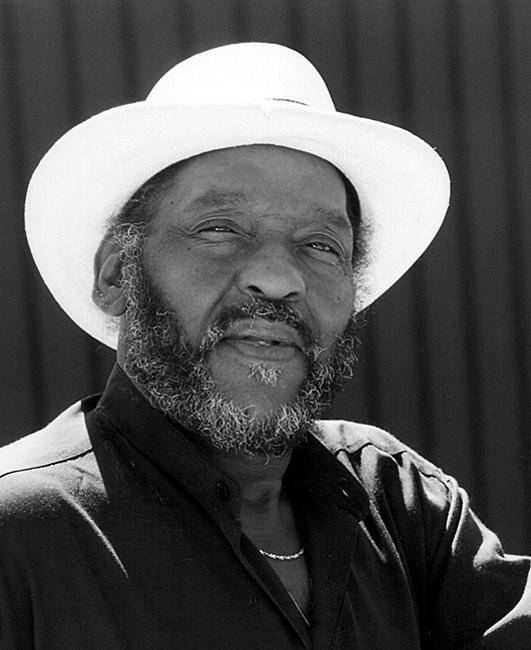

Background information
- Born: October 7, 1939; Jackson, Mississippi, U.S.
- Died: March 20, 2009 (aged 69) Kitchener, Ontario Canada
- Genres: Blues rock, blues, R&B
- Occupations: Musician, songwriter
- Instruments: Vocals, guitar
- Labels: ABC; Impulse! Electro-Fi

Mel Brown (October 7, 1939 – March 20, 2009) was an American-born blues guitarist and singer. He is best remembered for his decade-long backing of Bobby Bland, although in his own right Brown recorded over a dozen albums between 1967 and 2006.

== Career ==
Brown was born in Jackson, Mississippi, United States, and was presented with his first guitar as a teenager while recovering from a bout of meningitis. By 1955, after performing backing duties for both Sonny Boy Williamson II and Jimmy Beasley, Brown had a two year long stint backing Johnny Otis. This led to work with Etta James, where he swapped his Gibson Les Paul for an ES-175 to give him a richer and fuller tone to his guitar work, that set him apart from his contemporaries.

The stress of constant touring led him to Los Angeles, California, to resume work with Otis, spending an extended residency at the Club Sands. Further session duties saw Brown back Bobby Darin and Bill Cosby among others, as well as performing on T-Bone Walker's Funky Town. ABC Records producer Bob Thiele offered Brown the chance to record his own material, and Brown released Chicken Fat in 1967. Though principally a blues musician, Brown would also transition into jazz and soul jazz through his association with Bob Thiele, including a prominent role with the Oliver Nelson Big Band and appearing on Live from Los Angeles (released by Impulse!).

One of Brown's most celebrated tracks is the 11+ minute guitar solo, "Eighteen Pounds of Unclean Chitlings", which features on I'd Rather Suck My Thumb (1970), and was reissued as the lead track (and title) on a BluesWay Records collection released in 1973. For many years in the 1980s and 1990s, Brown was a prominent member of the house band at Antone's Night Club in Austin, Texas.

Brown was nominated for a Juno Award in both 2001 and 2002.

Brown died aged 69, on March 20, 2009, in Kitchener, Ontario, of complications from emphysema.

A documentary film, Love Lost & Found: The Story of Mel Brown directed by Sean Jasmins for Blue Fusion Productions was granted a theatrical release in 2014.

Visit Mississippi unveiled a Mississippi Blues Trail Marker in Kitchner. The ceremony happening on August 9, 2025 and coincided with the Kitchner Blues Festival.

== Discography ==
=== As leader ===
- 1967: Chicken Fat (ABC Impulse!)
- 1968: The Wizard (ABC Impulse!)
- 1969: Blues for We (ABC Impulse!)
- 1970: I'd Rather Suck My Thumb (ABC Impulse!) includes Brown's signature tune, "Eighteen Pounds of Unclean Chitlings"
- 1971: Mel Brown's Fifth (ABC Impulse!)
- 1973: Big Foot Country Girl (ABC Impulse!)
- 1973: Eighteen Pounds of Unclean Chitlins and Other Greasy Blues Specialties (BluesWay) compilation
- 1998: Can't Stop Blowin' (Electro-Fi) Snooky Pryor with special guest Mel Brown
- 1999: Neck Bones & Caviar (Electro-Fi) Mel Brown
- 2000: Double Shot! (Electro-Fi) Snooky Pryor and Mel Brown
- 2001: Homewreckin’ Done Live (Electro-Fi) Mel Brown and the Homewreckers
- 2004: Coming From the Old School (Electro-Fi) Sam Myers with special guest Mel Brown
- 2006: Blues – A Beautiful Thing (Electro-Fi) Mel Brown and the Homewreckers
- 2006: Mel Brown – The DVD (Electro-Fi)
- 2010: Love, Lost and Found (Electro-Fi) compilation

=== As sideman ===
- Clifford Coulter – East Side San Jose (Impulse!, 1970)
- Clifford Coulter – Do It Now! (Impulse!, 1971)
- B.B. King – L.A. Midnight – Guitar
- B.B. King and Bobby Blue Bland – Together for the First Time... Live – Guitar
- Albert Collins – Cold Snap – Guitar
- James Cotton – Mighty Long Time – Piano
- Lightnin' Hopkins – It’s a Sin To Be Rich – Guitar, Organ, Electric Piano
- John Lee Hooker – Endless Boogie – Acoustic Guitar
- John Lee Hooker – Never Get Out of These Blues Alive – Guitar and Bass
- Jimmy McGriff – The Starting Five (Milestone, 1987) - Guitar
- Jimmy McGriff – The Dream Team (Milestone, 1997) – Guitar
- Doug Sahm – Juke Box Music – Keyboards
- Earl Hooker – Simply The Best – Guitar
- Charles Brown – Legend – Guitar
- T-Bone Walker – Stormy Monday Blues (BluesWay, 1968)
- T-Bone Walker – Funky Town (BluesWay, 1969)
- Monica Dupont – Vintage (1980) – Guitar
- Little Bobby and the Jumpstarts – Tickets in the Glovebox – Piano, Guitar
- Harmonica Shah – Listen At Me Good – Guitar
