= Every Day I Have the Blues (disambiguation) =

"Every Day I Have the Blues" is a blues standard.

Every Day I Have the Blues or Everyday I Have the Blues may also refer to:

- Every Day I Have the Blues (Jimmy Rushing album)
- Everyday I Have the Blues (T-Bone Walker album)
- Everyday I Have the Blues (Joe Williams album)
