= Stormy Monday Blues (album) =

Studio album by T-Bone Walker
- Released: 1968
- Recorded: May 24 & 25, 1967
- Studio: Los Angeles
- Genre: Blues
- Length: 29:45
- Label: BluesWay
- Producer: Bob Thiele

T-Bone Walker chronology
| The Truth (1967) | Stormy Monday Blues (1968) | Funky Town (1968) |

Stormy Monday Blues is an album by blues guitarist/vocalist T-Bone Walker released by the BluesWay label in 1968.

== Reception ==
Professional ratings
Review scores
| Source | Rating |
|---|---|
| AllMusic | 3/5 stars |
| The Penguin Guide to Blues Recordings | 2.5/4 stars |

AllMusic reviewer Steve Leggett stated: "The high level of creativity in play here isn't obvious on a cursory listen, since a lot of the tracks favor the same sort of midtempo blues shuffle, but a closer listen reveals a stunning guitarist who plays the blues with a jazzman's soul, and while Walker isn't a flashy singer, he gets the job done with enough conviction that you can feel the country dust settling in behind his urbane delivery, and when he cuts loose a little on guitar, the sparks fly with elegant tension. The highlight here, of course, is Walker's umpteenth version of "Stormy Monday Blues," a track he originally recorded way back in 1947, giving the world a bona fide blues classic, and if he revisits it again here, that's fine".

== Track listing ==
All compositions by T-Bone Walker except where noted

1. "I'm Gonna Stop This Nite Life" (Grover McDaniel) – 3:25
2. "Little Girl, Don't You Know" (McDaniel) – 4:45
3. "Every Night I Have to Cry" (McDaniel) – 2:45
4. "I'm Still in Love with You" – 3:29
5. "Cold Hearted Woman" (McDaniel) – 2:30
6. "Treat Me So Down Low" – 2:35
7. "Stormy Monday" – 2:20
8. "Confusion Blues" (McDaniel) – 2:50
9. "I Gotta Break Baby" – 2:25
10. "Flower Blues" – 2:41

== Personnel ==
- T-Bone Walker – guitar, vocals
- Mel Moore, Preston Love – trumpet
- John "Streamline" Ewing – trombone
- McKinley Johnson – alto saxophone
- Mel Jernigan – tenor saxophone
- John Williams – baritone saxophone
- Mel Brown – guitar
- Lloyd Glenn – piano
- Ron Brown – Fender bass
- Paul Humphrey – drums
