= Blue Shadows =

Single by Lowell Fulson
- B-side: "Low Society Blues"
- Released: 1950
- Recorded: Los Angeles; 1949–1950
- Genre: Blues
- Length: 2:49
- Label: Swing Time (Cat no. 226)
- Songwriter(s): Lloyd Glenn

Lowell Fulson singles chronology
"Mama, Bring Your Clothes Back Home" / "Cold Hearted Woman" (1950)	"Blue Shadows" (1950)	"Lonesome Christmas Part I" / "Part II" (1950)

"Blue Shadows" is a 1950 single by Lowell Fulson, featuring Lloyd Glenn at the "88". The single was Lowell Fulson's biggest hit on the R&B chart, hitting number one for one week. The B-side, "Low Society Blues", peaked at number eight.
