= The Wizard (album) =

Studio album by Mel Brown
- Released: 1968
- Recorded: March 21, 1968
- Genre: Blues
- Length: 40:02
- Label: Impulse!
- Producer: Bob Thiele

Mel Brown chronology
Chicken Fat (1967)	The Wizard (1968)	Blues for We (1969)

The Wizard is the second album by American blues guitarist Mel Brown recorded in 1968 for the Impulse! label.

== Reception ==
The Allmusic review awarded the album 2 stars.

Professional ratings
Review scores
Source	Rating
Allmusic	2/5 stars

== Track listing ==
All compositions by Mel Brown except as indicated

1. "Ode to Billie Joe" (Bobbie Gentry) – 4:23
2. "Swamp Fever" – 6:05
3. "Blues After Hours" (Pee Wee Crayton, Jules Taub) – 6:34
4. "African Sweets" (Dee Ervin) – 3:10
5. "Stop" (Jerry Ragovoy) – 4:21
6. "Chuck a Funk" – 4:53
7. "Miss Ann" – 4:10
8. "W-2 Withholding" – 2:12

- Recorded in Los Angeles, California on March 21, 1968

== Personnel ==
- Mel Brown – guitar
- Terry Evans – guitar
- Mack Johnston – trumpet
- Clifford Solomon – tenor saxophone
- Unknown – piano, organ
- Ronald Brown – bass
- Paul Humphrey – drums
- Roy Brown – vocals
