= I'd Rather Suck My Thumb =

Studio album by Mel Brown
- Released: 1970
- Recorded: July–October, 1969
- Genre: Blues
- Length: 42:51
- Label: Impulse!
- Producer: Ed Michel

Mel Brown chronology
Blues for We (1969)	I'd Rather Suck My Thumb (1970)	Mel Brown's Fifth (1969)

I'd Rather Suck My Thumb is the fourth album by American blues guitarist Mel Brown recorded in 1969 for the Impulse! label.

== Reception ==
The Allmusic review awarded the album 2 stars.

Professional ratings
Review scores
Source	Rating
Allmusic	2/5 stars

== Track listing ==
All compositions by Mel Brown except as indicated

1. "I'd Rather Suck My Thumb" – 5:33
2. "Scorpio" – 6:30
3. "Eighteen Pounds of Unclean Chitlings" – 11:10
4. "You Got Me Hummin'" – 4:15
5. "Do Your Thing" (Charles Wright) – 5:36
6. "Troubles" – 5:20
7. "Dixie" (Dan Emmett) – 4:27
- Recorded in Los Angeles, California at Vault Recording Studios or Soul Recording Studios (track 4 only) during July, August and October 1969

== Personnel ==
- Mel Brown – guitar, vocals
- Matthew Kelly – harmonica
- Clifford Coulter – organ, electric piano
- Johnny Carswell – organ (track 4 only)
- Bob West – electric bass
- Gregg Ferber – drums
