= Tupelo Chain Sex =

US musical group

- Genres: Punk, Jazz, Rockabilly, Psychedelic, Psychobilly
- Years active: 1982–1989
- Labels: Cargo, Selma
- Past members: Joey Altruda; Dave Dahlson; Don "Sugarcane" Harris; Duff Marlowe; Bill Nugent; J.J. Poskin; Kevin McCormick; Willie "Dred" McNeill; Paul Lines; Jason Keene; Lame Flames

Tupelo Chain Sex was a 1980s era punk/jazz/rockabilly musical group founded by Dave Dahlson aka "Limey Dave", J.J. Poskin (aka JJ Holiday), Sim Cass, and Joey Altruda who also founded the group Jump With Joey. In the early 1980s, they were headline performers at Club Lingerie in Los Angeles, and also performed at the Sunday Club at Cathay de Grande (restaurant), The Music Machine, Al's Bar, The Anti-Club, and the O.N. Klub, among others, and toured extensively with groups like The Circle Jerks.

== Members ==
One of the Los Angeles based group's most notable members was electric violinist Don "Sugarcane" Harris, who previously played with Frank Zappa and The Mothers of Invention.

In 1982, Willy "Wooly" McNeil joined what was then called "a raucous psychobilly outfit". Lead singer "Limey" Dave (Dave Dahlson), the front man for the group, sported a blue Mohawk, tattoos of Roman soldiers, women's sunglasses, jeans with the ass cheeks cut out, and was purportedly a narcoleptic.

== Critical reception ==
Graphic artist Art Chantry called Tupelo Chain Sex one of the "... best fucking bands I've seen in my life" and compared them to contemporary groups such as Sonic Youth, Hüsker Dü, Butthole Surfers and the Cramps among others.

Concert flyer circa 1984

Critics have had difficulty classifying the music of Tupelo Chain Sex as exemplified by The Miami News noting that "Their music has been called jazz, bop, be-bop, R&B, swing, reggae, country, rock, blues, punk, funk, Latin, mambo, thrash, calypso, salsa, soul, shuffle, skiffle, ska, skank, surf, boogie, jive, dub ... and psycho-billy."

When the group hit the Los Angeles music scene, the Los Angeles Times called it "bizarre" and "an avant-garde rockabilly combo featuring washboard, harmonica and a singer named Limey Dave who sports a Mohawk, shouts dislocated epics like Elvis Presley Meets E.T., and alters his vocals through an echo device". In a subsequent review of a live performance, The Times declared that one of the group's major musical influences appeared to be dada.

The Washington Post called their music a "startling musical synthesis ... delivered with the visceral force of a punk group, as well as with the tricky tempos and superb solos of a jazz combo".

A SPIN Magazine reviewer called the group's approach to music a relationship between "Charlie Parker and, say, The Dead Kennedys" and Spot the Difference "the most eclectic album I've heard all year".

== Discography ==
- What Is It (Selma, 1982, LP)
- Ja-Jazz (Selma, 1983, LP)
- Spot the Difference (Selma, 1984, LP)
- Dr. Nightcall b/w Two Cadillacs Crash! (Selma, 1984, 7" ps)
- Record Breaker (DeLuxe, 1985, bootleg 10" on coloured vinyl)
- 4! (Cargo, 1989, LP & CD)
