= Chicken Fat (album) =

Studio album by Mel Brown
- Released: 1967
- Recorded: May 31 and June 1, 1967
- Genre: Blues
- Length: 40:02
- Label: Impulse!
- Producer: Bob Thiele

Mel Brown chronology
Chicken Fat (1967)	The Wizard (1967)

Chicken Fat is the debut album by American blues guitarist Mel Brown recorded in 1967 for the Impulse! label.

== Reception ==
The AllMusic review by Sean Westergaard awarded the album 4 stars stating "Guitarist Mel Brown is hailed as "An Impulse! Discovery" on Chicken Fat, his debut for the label, and this album does feature a fantastic unique sound... Leave it to Impulse! to put a new spin on the guitar/organ sound. This is hot stuff".

Professional ratings
Review scores
Source	Rating
AllMusic	4/5 stars

== Track listing ==
All compositions by Mel Brown, except as indicated

1. "Chicken Fat" - 4:16
2. "Greasy Spoon" (Mel Brown, Herb Ellis, Paul Humphrey) - 5:53
3. "Home James" - 6:34
4. "Slalom" (Jules Chaikin) - 2:31
5. "Hobo Flats" (Oliver Nelson) - 2:18
6. "Shanty" (Brown, Arthur Wright) - 4:40
7. "Sad But True" (Ellis) - 5:01
8. "I'm Goin' to Jackson" (Ellis) - 4:24
9. "Blues for Big Bob" - 4:25

Recorded in Hollywood, California on May 31, 1967 (tracks 1–3, 7 & 8) and June 1, 1967 (tracks 4–6 & 9)

== Personnel ==
- Mel Brown - guitar
- Herb Ellis (tracks 1–3, 7 & 8), Arthur Wright (tracks 4–6 & 9) - guitar
- Gerald Wiggins - organ (tracks 1, 3–7 & 9)
- Ronald Brown - bass
- Paul Humphrey - drums (tracks 1–4, 7 & 8)
- Oliver Nelson - arranger (tracks 4–6 & 9)
