= East Side San Jose =

Studio album by Clifford Coulter
- Released: 1970
- Recorded: April–May, 1970
- Genre: Jazz
- Length: 36:18
- Label: Impulse!
- Producer: Ed Michel

Clifford Coulter chronology
East Side San Jose (1970)	Do It Now! (1971)

East Side San Jose is the debut album by American guitarist and keyboardist Clifford Coulter recorded in 1970 for the Impulse! label. The album title refers to East San Jose, California, with the cover art showing a scene from the district.

== Reception ==
The Allmusic review awarded the album 3 stars.

Professional ratings
Review scores
Source	Rating
Allmusic	3/5 stars

== Track listing ==
All compositions by Clifford Coulter

1. "Do It Again" – 4:44
2. "East Side San Jose" – 3:23
3. "Prayer Garden" – 3:06
4. "Cliff's Place" – 7:10
5. "Sal Si Puedes (Get Out If You Can)" – 8:05
6. "Big Fat Funky Shirley" – 4:08
7. "Alum Rock Park" – 5:42
- Recorded at Wally Heider Sound Studios in San Francisco, California, and Vault Recording Studios in Los Angeles, California, in April and May 1970.

== Personnel ==
- Clifford Coulter – piano, organ, electric piano, guitar, vocals
- John Turk – trumpet
- Gino Landry – alto saxophone
- Cornelius Bumpus – tenor saxophone
- Mel Brown – guitar
- Jerry Perez – rhythm guitar
- Jimmy Calhoun – electric bass
- Billy Ingram (tracks 4 & 6), Joe Provost (tracks 1–3, 5 & 7) – drums
