= Free Beer and Chicken =

Studio album by John Lee Hooker
- Released: 1974
- Recorded: May 1974
- Studio: The Record Plant, Sausalito, California; The Village Recorder, Los Angeles
- Genre: Blues
- Length: 39:46
- Label: ABC
- Producer: Ed Michel

John Lee Hooker chronology
Born in Mississippi, Raised Up in Tennessee (1973)	Free Beer and Chicken (1974)	Alone (1976)

Free Beer and Chicken is an album by blues musician John Lee Hooker recorded in California in 1974 and released by the ABC label the same year.

== Reception ==
Professional ratings
Review scores
Source	Rating
AllMusic	2/5 stars
The Penguin Guide to Blues Recordings	2.5/4 stars

AllMusic reviewer Eugene Chadbourne stated: "In some ways this is a typical John Lee Hooker album; in other ways it is totally unlike any other he did. Being interesting can be a curse, however, as the music itself just isn't that inspired. Of course ... Free Beer and Chicken has the sound of a collection of tracks that were salvaged from some ambitious but never finished project involving dozens of guests. That's one thing that is typical, or at least would become typical in the last, most high-profile decade of Hooker's career ... Free Beer and Chicken gets a low rating due to the presence of all the talent mentioned, as well as the genius of Hooker: With all that going for it, this should have been a much better album".

== Track listing ==
All compositions credited to John Lee Hooker

1. "Make It Funky" – 3:27
2. "Five Long Years" (Eddie Boyd) – 5:59
3. "713 Blues" – 4:39
4. "714 Blues" – 2:59
5. "One Bourbon, One Scotch, One Beer" – 3:29
6. "Homework" – 4:26
7. "Bluebird" 4:52
8. "Settin' on Top of the World" – 3:27
9. "(You'll Never Amount to Anything If You Don't Go to) Collage (A Fortuitous Concatenation of Events)" – 5:52
  1. "I Know How to Rock"
  2. "Nothin' But the Best"
  3. "The Scratch" (Joe Cocker)
  4. "Sally Mae"

== Personnel ==
- John Lee Hooker – guitar, vocals
- Greg Adams – trumpet (tracks 1, 7 & 9)
- Mic Gillette – trumpet, trombone (tracks 1, 7 & 9)
- Sam Rivers – flute (track 2)
- Emilio Castillo (tracks 1, 7 & 9), Lenny Pickett (tracks 1 & 7) – tenor saxophone
- Stephen Kupka – baritone saxophone (tracks 1, 7 & 9)
- Jim Caroompas (track 9), Charles Grimes (tracks 1 & 9), Hollywood Fats (tracks 3–5, 7 & 8), Jim Kahr (tracks 2 & 7), Jim Thorsen (track 9), Howard Roberts (tracks 3, 4 & 6), Luther Tucker (track 9), Wa-Wa Watson (tracks 1, 2, 6 & 9), – guitar
- Clifford Coulter – piano, Fender Rhodes electric piano, Hohner clavinet, Fender bass, Moog bass, Moog synthesizer, ARP synthesizer
- Robert Hooker – piano, Fender Rhodes electric piano, Hammond organ (tracks 1 & 9)
- Skip Olsen – Fender bass, bass (tracks 3, 4 & 9)
- Ron E. Beck (tracks 2–6), Ken Swank (tracks 1, 3, 4, 7 & 9) – drums
- Kenneth Nash – balophon, congas, Griot bells, Chinese hand cymbals, Ganquok bell, shaker (tracks 1 & 8), kalimba (track 8)
- Joe Cocker – vocals, tambourine (tracks 2, 5 & 9)
- Sugarcane Harris (tracks 3 & 4), Michael White (tracks 8 & 9) – violin
- Peter Berg – coconut banjo (track 8)
- Fatz Wess – tom tom, Moog synthesizer (track 8)
- Boyd Albritton – slide guitar (track 9)
