= Clifford Coulter =

American musician

Clifford Coulter (died August 16, 2021) was an American blues, R&B and jazz guitarist and keyboardist.

== Career ==
He released three albums, 1970's East Side San Jose with Billy Ingram and Joe Provost on drums. (Impulse! Records), 1971's Do It Now! (Impulse! Records) and 1980's The Better Part of Me (Columbia Records). The latter record was produced by Bill Withers, and included contributions from Russ Kunkel, Ron E. Beck, and Jerry Perez, and is an AllMusic album pick.

Coulter played the mellophonium on John Lee Hooker's 1973 album, Born in Mississippi, Raised Up in Tennessee. His recorded work therefore included both solo releases and contributions to albums by other artists.

== Discography ==
- East Side San Jose (Impulse!, 1970)
- Do It Now! (Impulse!, 1971)
- The Better Part of Me (Columbia, 1980)

With Mel Brown

- I'd Rather Suck My Thumb (Impulse!, 1969)

With Sonny Fortune

- Waves of Dreams (Horizon, 1976)

With John Lee Hooker

- Born in Mississippi, Raised Up in Tennessee (Capitol, 1973)
- Free Beer and Chicken (ABC, 1974)

With Michael White

- Father Music, Mother Dance (Impulse!, 1974)
