= Do It Now! (Clifford Coulter album) =

Studio album by Clifford Coulter
- Released: 1972
- Recorded: May 24 & 25 and September 28, 1971
- Genre: Jazz
- Length: 39:27
- Label: Impulse!
- Producer: Ed Michel

Clifford Coulter chronology
East Side San Jose (1970)	Do It Now! (1972)	The Better Part of Me (1980)

Do It Now! (subtitled Worry 'Bout It Later) is the second album by American guitarist and keyboardist Clifford Coulter recorded in 1971 for the Impulse! label.

== Reception ==
The Allmusic review awarded the album 3 stars. DownBeat noted, "Coulter is best at the keyboards and gets around especially nicely on organ. As a vocalist, he shows promise."

Professional ratings
Review scores
Source	Rating
Allmusic	3/5 stars
DownBeat	2/5 stars

== Track listing ==
All compositions by Clifford Coulter except as indicated

1. "Ridin' On Empty" (Gene Robert) – 4:27
2. "Yodelin' in the Whatchamaname Thang" – 6:40
3. "Do It Now" – 5:45
4. "Worry Later" – 3:23
5. "Mr. Peabody" – 3:56
6. "VJC" – 8:56
7. "Before the Morning Comes" (Robert) – 6:20
  - Recorded at Western Recorders, Los Angeles, California on May 24 & 25, 1970 and at Wally Heider Sound Studios in San Francisco, California on September 28, 1971

== Personnel ==
- Clifford Coulter – piano, organ, electric piano, guitar, melodica, vocals, tambourine
- Harry Edison – trumpet
- John Turk – trumpet, varitone trumpet, cowbell
- Jimmy Cleveland – trombone
- Willie Ruff – French horn
- Bill Perkins – alto saxophone
- Marshal Royal – tenor saxophone
- Plas Johnson – tenor saxophone, baritone saxophone
- Mel Brown, Sonny Glaze, Ray MacCarty – guitar
- Jimmy Calhoun – electric bass
- Ron Beck – drums, vocals
- Cubby Ingram- Congas
- Lucy Wilkins, Marlene Wilkins, Donnie Rogers, Shanne Coulter – vocals
