= Blues for We =

Studio album by Mel Brown
- Released: 1969
- Recorded: March 3, 1969
- Genre: Blues
- Label: Impulse!
- Producer: Bob Thiele

Mel Brown chronology
The Wizard (1967)	Blues for We (1969)	I'd Rather Suck My Thumb (1969)

Blues for We is the third album by American blues guitarist Mel Brown recorded in 1969 for the Impulse! label.

== Reception ==
The Allmusic review by Jason Ankeny awarded the album 2½ stars stating "The title notwithstanding, Blues for We largely abandons all pretense of conventional blues idioms to couch Brown in a series of soul-jazz contexts that draw heavily on mainstream R&B formulas; the problem is the material, which spans from avant-garde jazz to bubblegum pop and stretches even a player of Brown's considerable range far past the point of no return. Sometimes a record can be too ambitious for its own good, and the reach of Blues for We definitely exceeds its grasp – given the choice to pursue any number of directions, Brown sets off in all of them, and loses himself in the process".

Professional ratings
Review scores
Source	Rating
AllMusic	2.5/5 stars

== Track listing ==
All compositions by Mel Brown except as indicated

1. "Twist & Shout" (Phil Medley, Bert Russell)
2. "Blues For We"
3. "Ob-La-Di Ob-La-Da" (John Lennon, Paul McCartney)
4. "Son of a Preacher Man (John Hurley, Ronnie Wilkins)
5. "Set Me Free"
6. "Freaky Zeke"
7. "Indian Giver"
8. "Stranger on the Shore" (Acker Bilk)
- Recorded in Los Angeles, California on March 3, 1969

== Personnel ==
- Mel Brown – guitar, vocals
- Abraham Miller – drums
- Artie Butler – arranger, conductor
- Unidentified horns and strings
