= Good Feelin' =

Studio album by T-Bone Walker
- Released: 1969
- Recorded: November 1968
- Studio: Studio CBE, Paris, France
- Genre: Blues
- Length: 39:28
- Label: Polydor; 24-4502
- Producer: Robin Hemingway

T-Bone Walker chronology
Funky Town (1968)	Good Feelin' (1969)	Everyday I Have the Blues (1969)

Good Feelin' (stylised as ...good feelin'...) is an album by blues guitarist/vocalist T-Bone Walker recorded in Paris in 1968 and released by the Polydor label in 1969. The album received a Grammy for “Best Ethnic or Traditional Recording” in 1970, and it was reissued on CD by Sunnyside Records in 2007.

== Reception ==
Professional ratings
Review scores
Source	Rating
AllMusic	4/5 stars

AllMusic reviewer arwulf arwulf stated: "Recorded in Paris during November 1968, Good Feelin' was the album that rekindled public interest in the life and music of Aaron "T-Bone" Walker throughout Europe and even in some portions of the United States of America. ... With T-Bone's electric guitar sizzling in its own juice and the horns signifying together over soulful organ grooves and freshly ground basslines, all of this music is rich and powerful".

== Track listing ==
All compositions by Aaron Walker except where noted

1. "Good Feelin'" (Walker, Robin Hemingway) – 1:31
2. "Every Day I Have the Blues" (Peter Chatman) – 2:48
3. "Woman You Must Be Crazy" – 6:17
4. "Long Lost Lover" – 2:56
5. "I Wonder Why" – 4:15
6. "Vacation" – 3:05
7. "Shake It Baby" – 3:37
8. "Poontang" (Walker, Hemingway) –2:49
9. "Reconsider" – 4:44
10. "Sail On Little Girl" – 2:46
11. "When I Grow Up" – 3:15
12. "See You Next Time" (Walker, Hemingway) – 1:01

== Personnel ==
- T-Bone Walker – guitar, piano, vocals
- unidentified musician – trumpet
- Francis Cournet, Pierre Holassian – saxophone
- Manu Dibango – saxophone, piano, organ
- Michel Sardaby – piano
- Bernard Estardy – piano, organ, percussion
- Slim Pezin – guitar
- Jeannot Karl – bass
- Lucien Dobat – drums
- Earl Lett, Jean-Louis Proust – percussion
