= Lloyd Glenn =

American pianist, bandleader and arranger

- Birth name: Lloyd Colquitt Glenn
- Born: November 21, 1909 San Antonio, Texas, U.S.
- Died: May 23, 1985 (aged 75) Los Angeles, California, U.S.
- Occupations: Musician; bandleader; arranger; businessman
- Instrument: Pianist
- Labels: Imperial Records

Lloyd Colquitt Glenn (November 21, 1909 – May 23, 1985) was an American R&B pianist, bandleader and arranger, who was a pioneer of the "West Coast" blues style.

== Career ==
Born in San Antonio, Texas, from the late 1920s, Glenn played with various jazz bands in the Dallas and San Antonio areas, first recording in 1936 with Don Albert's Orchestra. He moved to California in 1941, joining the Walter Johnson trio in 1944, and finding employment as a session musician and arranger. He accompanied T-Bone Walker on his 1947 hit "Call It Stormy Monday", and later the same year made his own first solo records, billed as Lloyd Glenn and His Joymakers.

In 1949 he joined Swing Time Records as A&R man, and recorded a number of hits with Lowell Fulson, including "Every Day I Have the Blues" and the number one R&B hit "Blue Shadows". He also had major R&B hits of his own, with "Old Time Shuffle Blues" (number 3 U.S. Billboard R&B chart in 1950) being followed by "Chica Boo", which also made number one on the R&B chart in June 1951. At the same time, he continued to perform as pianist in Kid Ory's Creole Jazz Band. Glenn left Ory in 1953, about the same time that he was contracted to Aladdin Records, where he both produced and played on, B.B. King's 1960 album, My Kind of Blues.

He continued working through the 1960s, as both a session musician with King, Walker and others, and as a recording artist in his own right. Towards the end of his career he played at clubs in Los Angeles, performed at the Monterey Jazz Festival, and toured with Clarence "Gatemouth" Brown, Big Joe Turner, and his musician son, Lloyd Glenn Jr.

Glenn died in Los Angeles, California of a heart attack in May 1985.

== Discography ==
As leader

- All Time Favorites (Swing Time, 1954) [10" LP]
- Chica-Boo (Aladdin, 1956)
- After Hours (Score, 1958; Imperial, 1962)
- Old Time Shuffle (Black & Blue, 1976)
- Heat Wave with Clarence "Gatemouth" Brown (Black & Blue, 1977)
- After Hours Piano Blues and Boogie Woogie (Oldie Blues, 1982)
- Blue Ivories (Stockholm, 1984)
- Honky Tonk Train (Night Train International, 1991)
- Chica Boo (Night Train International, 1994)
- The Chronological Lloyd Glenn 1947–1950 (Classic 'Blues & Rhythm' series, 2001)
- The Chronological Lloyd Glenn 1951–1952 (Classic 'Blues & Rhythm' series, 2003)
- The Chronological Lloyd Glenn 1954–1957 (Classic 'Blues & Rhythm' series, 2008)
- Boogie Woogie Shuffle Time: West Coast Blues From California's Greatest Piano Man 1945–1952 (Jasmine, 2016)

With Lowell Fulson

- The Chronological Lowell Fulson 1948–1949 (Classic 'Blues & Rhythm' series, 2004)
- The Chronological Lowell Fulson 1949–1951 (Classic 'Blues & Rhythm' series, 2005)

With Eddie "Cleanhead" Vinson

- The "Clean" Machine (Muse, 1978)

With T-Bone Walker

- Stormy Monday Blues (BluesWay, 1968)

With Big Joe Turner

- Things I Used to Do (Pablo, 1977)
