= Everyday I Have the Blues (T-Bone Walker album) =

Studio album by T-Bone Walker
- Released: 1969
- Genre: Blues
- Length: 31:39
- Label: BluesTime
- Producer: Bob Thiele

T-Bone Walker chronology
Good Feelin' (1969)	Everyday I Have the Blues (1969)	Super Black Blues (1969)

Everyday I Have the Blues is a studio album by American electric blues guitar pioneer T-Bone Walker. Originally released in 1969, it was his second solo album of the year and sandwiched between appearances on two blues compilation albums.

== Critical reception ==
Professional ratings
Review scores
Source	Rating
AllMusic	3/5 stars

Stephen Thomas Erlewine, in a review for AllMusic, gave the album three out of five stars. He writes:

Every Day I Have the Blues is more about the sounds and feel of 1969 [as Walker] amiably plays with the burbling organ, slightly too bawdy horns, and too loose rhythms. What's fun here is that very distant disconnect, how Walker doesn't fully embrace his new surroundings but is game anyway, playing up a storm on otherwise undistinguished instrumentals.

== Track listing ==
Taken from album liner notes.

Side one
No.	Title	Writer(s)	Length
1.	"Everyday I Have the Blues"	Peter Chapman a.k.a. Memphis Slim	4:21
2.	"Vietnam"	Bob Thiele	5:03
3.	"Shake it Baby"	John Lee Hooker	3:05
4.	"Cold, Cold Feeling"	Jessie Mae Robinson	3:14

Side two
No.	Title	Writer(s)	Length
1.	"T-Bone Blues Special"	T-Bone Walker	8:49
2.	"For B.B. King"	Louis Shelton	3:47
3.	"Sail On"	Walker	3:21

== Personnel ==
- T-Bone Walker – guitar, vocals
- Louis Shelton – guitar
- Max Bennett – bass
- Paul Humphrey – drums
- Artie Butler – piano, organ
- Tom Scott – tenor saxophone
- Jack Hunt – engineer
- Gene Thompson – remix engineer
- Bob Thiele – producer
- Irv Glaser – cover photography
- Jim Marshall – photography
- Robert Flynn – design
- Carman Moore – liner notes
