= Double Shot! =

Studio album by Snooky Pryor and Mel Brown
- Released: 2000
- Recorded: October 18 and 19, 1999
- Studio: Liquid Recording Studio, Toronto, Ontario, Canada
- Genre: Blues
- Length: 57:28
- Label: Electro-Fi Records
- Producer: Andrew Galloway, Sandra B. Tooze

Snooky Pryor chronology
Snooky Pryor: Shake My Hand (1999)	Double Shot! (2000)	Super Harps II (2001)

Mel Brown chronology
Neck Bones & Caviar (1999)	Double Shot! (2000)	Homewreckin’ Done Live (2001)

Professional ratings
Review scores
Source	Rating
The Penguin Guide to Blues Recordings	2.5/4 stars

Double Shot! is the first blues album recorded by harmonica player Snooky Pryor and guitarist Mel Brown. It was produced by Andrew Galloway and Sandra B. Tooze and was recorded on October 18 and 19 1999 at Liquid Recording Studio in Toronto, Ontario. It was released by Electro-Fi Records in 2000 with a running time of 57:28, and received a Juno Award nomination for Blues Album of The Year.

== Track listing ==
1. "Dirty Rat" (W. M. Thornton, M. Laylar) – 4:50
2. "Ruby Mae" (Mel Brown) – 4:55
3. "Early in the Morning" (Leo Hickman, Dallas Bartley, Louis Jordan) – 4:28
4. "Big Leg Woman" (Johnny Temple) – 7:31
5. "Snooky and Mel Boogie" (James Pryor) – 1:38
6. "Rock This House" (James A. Lane) – 4:03
7. "Let Your Hair Down, Woman" (James Pryor) – 5:20
8. "So Fine" (Johnny Otis) – 3:14
9. "That's All Right" (James A. Lane) – 6:48
10. "Do The Boogaloo" – (James Pryor) 5:05
11. "Ease My Mind" (Mel Brown) – 5:25
12. "Work 'Til My Days Are Gone" (James Pryor) – 3:34

== Personnel ==
- Snooky Pryor – harmonica, lead vocal (1, 3, 4, 7, 8, 10 and 12)
- Mel Brown – guitar, lead vocal (2, 6, 9 and 11), second vocal (3)
- The Homewreckers (1, 2, 3, 5 and 9):
  - John Lee – piano
  - Al Richardson – bass
  - Jim Bodreau – drums

Michael Fonfara – piano (4, 6, 7, 8, 10 and 11)
