= Luther Tucker =

American blues guitarist (1936–1993)

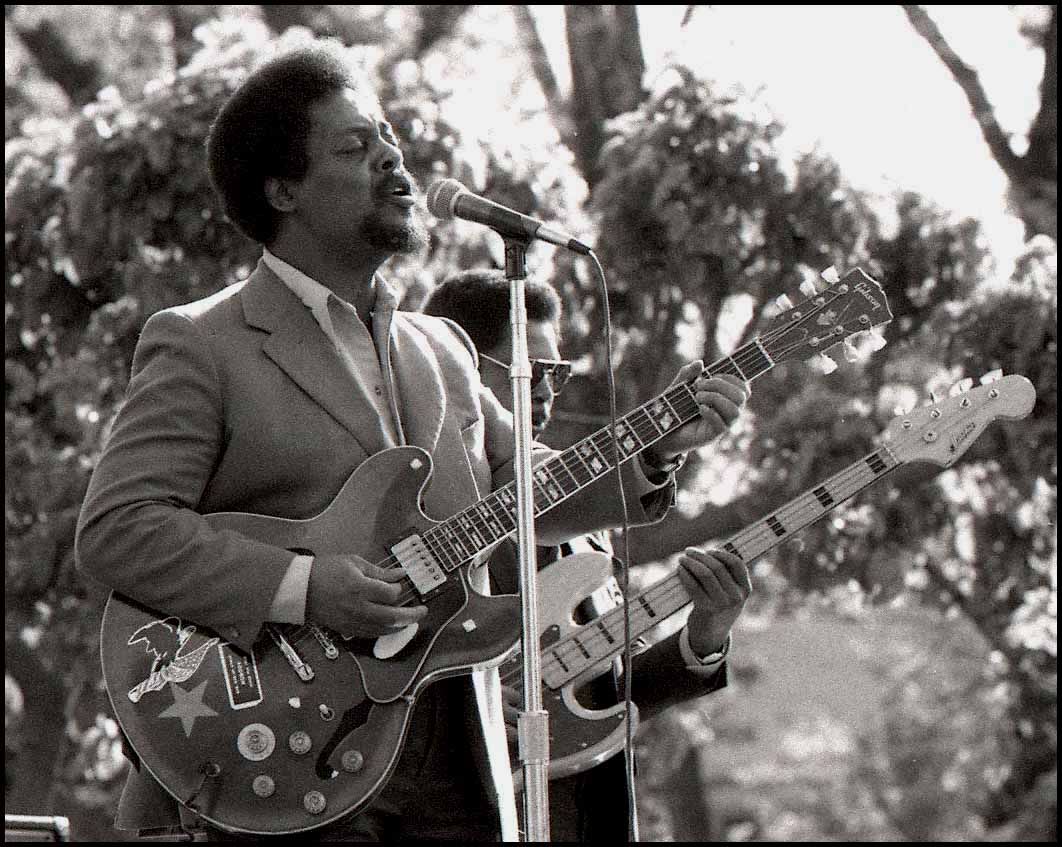
- Tucker playing May 12, 1964 Photo: Louis Ramirez

Background information
- Born: January 20, 1936; Memphis, Tennessee, United States
- Died: June 18, 1993 (aged 57) Greenbrae, California, United States
- Genres: Chicago Blues, blues, soul, rock, jazz, gospel
- Occupation: Musician
- Instruments: Guitar, vocals
- Years active: 1952–1993
- Labels: Lonestar Records; Rock'it Records; Antone's

Luther Tucker (January 20, 1936 – June 18, 1993) was an American blues guitarist.

Tucker is credited with helping to define the music known as Chicago blues, but played many styles, including blues, soul, rock, jazz and gospel. His distinctive style has been described by his protege Rusty Zinn as mandolin-like, creating a unique sound. Tucker was featured on the recordings of B.B. King, Mel Brown, Pat Hare, and Elmore James. He variously worked with Little Walter, Otis Rush, Muddy Waters, John Lee Hooker, The James Cotton Blues Band and Elvin Bishop.

== Career ==
=== Early years ===
Tucker was born in Memphis, Tennessee. His father, a carpenter, built Tucker his first guitar, but his first real guitar was a Sears Silvertone that his mother got him to keep him out of trouble. His mother, who played boogie-woogie piano, introduced him to Big Bill Broonzy and to Robert Lockwood Jr. Tucker went on to become Robert Jr.'s protégé, a guitarist and an individual for whom he had the greatest admiration and respect. Tucker always referred to him as "Mr. Robert Jr. Lockwood". Tucker's family moved from Memphis to Chicago, Illinois, when he was nine years old, in his teenage years his contemporaries and friends included Freddie King, Magic Sam and Otis Rush.

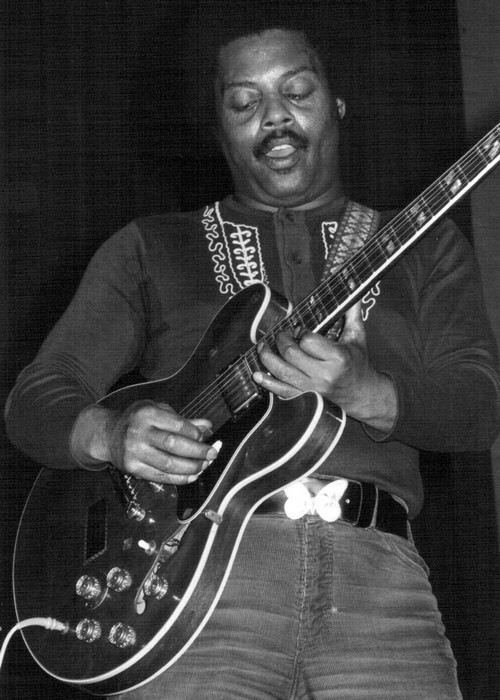
Luther Tucker in France, in 1980

== Playing with bands ==
Tucker's grave at Restvale Cemetery

In 1952, he began playing with his uncle, J.T. "Boogie" Brown, saxophonist, studio musician, and sideman to Elmore James. Tucker was soon back with Lockwood, who was one of the most sought after sidemen and studio guitarists on the Chicago blues scene. Lockwood went to the musician's union asking that Tucker be allowed to play in clubs, and reassured the Union that he would act as a guardian to him and keep the 16-year-old Tucker out of trouble. Lockwood had been B.B. King's rhythm guitarist between 1948 and 1949. Lockwood educated Tucker about minor diminished ninth and thirteenth chords to big bar-chords, and the subtle nuances of jazz guitar. Initially, Lockwood played lead guitar and Tucker played bass on a tuned-down six-string guitar (the Fender bass had not yet been invented) or Tucker would play rhythm guitar. Tucker learned to read music and began working as a studio guitarist at an early age. They worked with Little Walter off and on for seven years. First, as part of a twosome with Lockwood, and later as a lead guitarist, Tucker recorded on numerous classic sides behind Little Walter, Sonny Boy Williamson II, Jimmy Rogers, Muddy Waters, and Howlin' Wolf. He also recorded with Otis Rush, Snooky Pryor, and after moving to the West Coast, John Lee Hooker, Robben Ford, and Elvin Bishop.

In the late 1960s, Tucker worked in Muddy Waters' band along with harmonica player, James Cotton, and drummer, Francis Clay. In 1968, a cooperative band was put together composed of Tucker on guitar; drummer, Sam Lay; bassist and alumni of Howlin' Wolf's band, Bobby Anderson; Alberto Gianquinto, a pianist comfortable playing jazz, blues or classical music; and harmonica player and singer, James Cotton. First night out, the emcee at the club asked the band's name so he could announce them. For lack of a name, one of the band said, The James Cotton Blues Band. After a while, Sam Lay was replaced by Francis Clay. Clay brought a new dimension to the band and Tucker further developed his skills, playing soul tunes and jazz arrangements, utilizing the octave, minor and diminished chords he had learned from Lockwood. The group traveled the country from Fillmore West, in San Francisco to Fillmore East in New York, and on to Great Britain, Europe and other countries. The band spent a great deal of time in Northern California and, in 1973, Tucker left The James Cotton Blues Band and relocated to the town of San Anselmo, California.

For several years he worked with John Lee Hooker's band, Grayson Street Houserockers, L. C. Robinson, and as a house musician at Clifford Antone's club in Austin, Texas. He formed the Luther Tucker Band where he became known as a very competent and soulful singer. He played in clubs in the San Francisco Bay Area until his death. Tucker played at the San Francisco Blues Festival in 1973, 1976, and 1979. He would also play as part of supporting bands behind visiting friends and bluesmen including Fenton Robinson, Freddie King and Jimmy Reed.

Luther Tucker died of a heart attack in June, 1993, in Greenbrae, California, at the age of 57. His body was returned to Chicago, where he is buried in Restvale Cemetery in an unmarked plot. He recorded two albums, one incomplete, both released posthumously.

On May 9, 2009 the second annual White Lake Blues Festival took place at the Howmet Playhouse Theater in Whitehall, Michigan. The concert was organized by executive producer, Steve Salter, of the nonprofit organization Killer Blues, to raise monies to honor Tucker's unmarked grave with a headstone. The event was a success, and a headstone was placed in June 2009.

== Discography ==
=== Solo ===
- 1990: Sad Hours (Lonestar / Antone's)
- 1995: Luther Tucker and the Ford Blues Band (Rock'it Records)

=== As sideman ===
With John Lee Hooker

- Live at Soledad Prison (ABC, 1972)
- Free Beer and Chicken (ABC, 1974)

With Sonny Boy Williamson

- The Real Folk Blues (Chess, 1947-64 [1966])

== See also ==
- West Coast blues
