= Don "Sugarcane" Harris =

American violinist and guitarist

- Born: Don Francis Bowman Harris; June 18, 1938; Pasadena, California, U.S.
- Died: November 30, 1999 (aged 61) Los Angeles, California, U.S.
- Genres: Jazz fusion; blues rock; rock and roll; R&B
- Occupation: Musician
- Instruments: Violin; guitar
- Years active: 1960s–1999
- Label: Specialty

Don Francis Bowman "Sugarcane" Harris (June 18, 1938 – November 30, 1999) was an American jazz fusion and blues rock violinist and guitarist. He is considered a pioneer in the amplification of the violin.

== Career ==
Harris was born and raised in Pasadena, California, United States. His parents were carnival entertainers. As a youth, he studied classical violin, and learned additional instruments including harmonica, piano and guitar.

Harris began performing with a doo-wop group, The Squires, which included his childhood friend, the pianist Dewey Terry. The Squires recorded for Vita Records. Harris performed in Little Richard's band in the 1960s.

=== Don and Dewey ===
Harris and Terry formed a duo in 1956 as Don and Dewey. They were recorded by Art Rupe on his Specialty label, mostly utilizing the services of the drummer Earl Palmer. The duo also recorded on Rupe's other labels, Los Angeles Spot and Shade. Don and Dewey had no hits as an act, but several songs they co-wrote and recorded became early rock and roll classics for other musicians. These include "Farmer John" (the Premiers and, later, Neil Young), "Justine" (the Righteous Brothers), "I'm Leaving It Up to You" (Dale and Grace), and "Big Boy Pete" (the Olympics). Harris was given the nickname "Sugarcane" by bandleader Johnny Otis, due to his reputation as a ladies' man.

=== Frank Zappa and John Mayall's Bluesbreakers ===
After separating from Dewey Terry in the 1960s, Harris moved almost exclusively over to the electric violin. He reappeared as a sideman with John Mayall & the Bluesbreakers and Frank Zappa, most recognized for his appearances on Hot Rats and on the Mothers of Invention albums Burnt Weeny Sandwich and Weasels Ripped My Flesh. His lead vocal and blues violin solo on a cover of Little Richard's "Directly from My Heart to You" on Weasels, and his extended solo on "Little House I Used To Live In" on Weeny are considered highlights of those albums. Zappa, who had long admired Harris' playing, reportedly bailed him out of jail, resurrecting his career and ushering in a long period of creativity for the forgotten violin virtuoso. He played a couple of live concerts with Zappa's band in 1970, and performed on four of Zappa's solo albums.

=== Pure Food and Drug Act ===
During the early 1970s, Harris led the Pure Food and Drug Act, which included drummer Paul Lagos, guitarists Harvey Mandel and Randy Resnick, and bassist Victor Conte, who was the founder of the Bay Area Laboratory Co-operative. Conte replaced Larry Taylor, who was the original bass player. Conte went on to play with Tower of Power and Herbie Hancock. In their first concert, PFDA opened for Johnny Otis at El Monte Legion Hall. The audience was excited by Sugarcane's energy, his playing, singing and stage antics. While the performance showed the promise of the group, Harris's issues with controlled substances was a constant struggle, eventually contributing to his death.

In the 1980s, Harris was a member of the Los Angeles–based experimental rock band, Tupelo Chain Sex.

== Personal life and death ==
Harris' marriage ended in divorce. He had a daughter and two sons. He was addicted to drugs throughout his career. For most of his later years, he had pulmonary disease. He died on November 27, 1999, at home in Los Angeles, California, at the age of 61.

== Discography ==
=== As leader ===
- Keep On Driving (MPS/BASF, 1970)
- Sugarcane (Epic, 1970)
- Fiddler On the Rock (MPS, 1971)
- New Violin Summit with Jean-Luc Ponty, Nipso Brantner, Michal Urbaniak (MPS/BASF, 1971)
- Sugar Cane's Got the Blues (MPS/BASF, 1972)
- Cup Full Of Dreams (MPS/BASF, 1973)
- I'm On Your Case (MPS/BASF, 1974)
- Keyzop (MPS, 1975)
- Flashin' Time (MPS, 1976)

Don & Dewey

- Don and Dewey (1974)
- Bim Bam! (1985)
- Jungle Hop (1991)

=== As sideman ===
With John Lee Hooker

- Folk Blues (1959)
- Born in Mississippi (1973)
- Free Beer and Chicken (1974)

With Little Richard

- Little Richard Is Back (1964)
- Well Alright! (1970)

With Harvey Mandel

- The Snake (1972)
- Shangrenade (1973)

With John Mayall

- USA Union (1970)
- Back To The Roots (1971)
- Ten Years Are Gone (1973)
- Notice to Appear (1975)
- New Year, New Band, New Company (1975)
- Banquet in Blues (1976)
- Archives to Eighties (1988)
- Room to Move (1969–1974) (1992)
- Cross Country Blues (1994)
- Rock the Blues Tonight (1999)

With The Mothers of Invention

- Burnt Weeny Sandwich (1970)
- Weasels Ripped My Flesh (1970)

With Johnny Otis

- Cold Shot (1969)
- Cuttin' Up The Johnny Otis Show (1971)

With Tupelo Chain Sex

- Ja-Jazz (1983)
- Spot the Difference (1984)

With Frank Zappa

- Hot Rats (1969)
- Chunga's Revenge (1970)
- Apostrophe (') (1974)
- The Lost Episodes (1996)
- Funky Nothingness (2023)

With others

- Billy Bang, Changing Seasons (1980)
- Pure Food & Drug Act, Choice Cuts (1972)
- Freddie Roulette, Sweet Funky Steel (1993)
- Sonny Terry and Brownie McGhee, Sonny & Brownie (1973)
