= T-Bone Walker =

American blues musician and singer-songwriter (1910–1975)

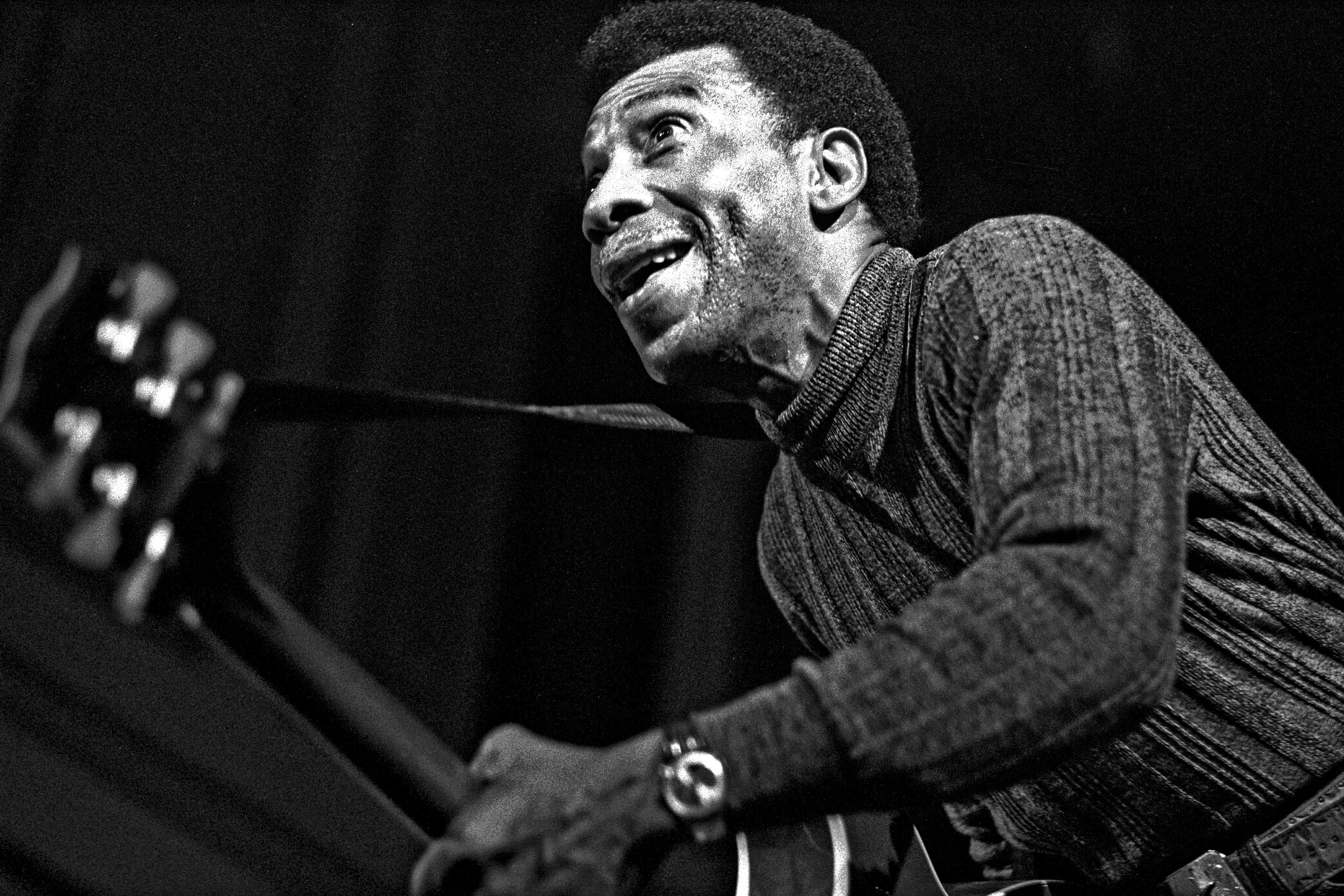
- Walker at the American Folk Blues Festival in Hamburg, March 1972

Background information
- Also known as: Oak Cliff T-Bone
- Born: Aaron Thibeaux Walker; May 28, 1910; Linden, Texas, U.S.
- Died: March 16, 1975 (aged 64) Los Angeles, California, U.S.
- Genres: Electric blues; Texas blues; jump blues; West Coast blues; Urban blues
- Occupations: Musician; composer; songwriter; bandleader
- Instruments: Guitar; vocals; piano; banjo; ukulele; violin; mandolin
- Years active: 1928–1975
- Labels: Atlantic; Black & Blue; Black & White; Brunswick; Capitol; Charly; Columbia; Duke; Imperial; Modern; Polydor; Reprise

Aaron Thibeaux "T-Bone" Walker (May 28, 1910 – March 16, 1975) was an American blues musician, composer, songwriter, and bandleader, who was a pioneer and innovator of the jump blues, West Coast blues, and electric blues sounds. In 2018 Rolling Stone magazine ranked him No. 67 on its list of "The 100 Greatest Guitarists of All Time".

== Biography ==
=== 1910–1941: early years ===
Aaron Thibeaux Walker was born in Linden, Texas. His parents, Movelia Jimerson and Rance Walker, were both musicians. His stepfather, Marco Washington (a member of the Dallas String Band), taught him to play the guitar, ukulele, banjo, violin, mandolin, and piano.

Walker began his career as a teenager in Dallas in the 1920s. His stepfather was a musician, and Blind Lemon Jefferson, a family friend, sometimes came over for dinner. Walker left school at the age of 10, and by 15 was a professional performer on the blues circuit. Initially, he was Jefferson's protégé and would guide him around Deep Ellum, Dallas, for his gigs. In 1929, Walker made his recording debut with Columbia Records, billed as Oak Cliff T-Bone, releasing the single "Wichita Falls Blues" backed with "Trinity River Blues". Oak Cliff is the community in which he lived at the time, and T-Bone is a corruption of his middle name. Pianist Douglas Fernell played accompaniment on the record.

Walker married Vida Lee in 1935; the couple had three children.

By the age of 25, Walker was working in clubs on Central Avenue in Los Angeles, sometimes as the featured singer and as guitarist with Les Hite's orchestra. In 1940 he recorded with Hite for the Varsity label, but he was featured only as a singer. He started playing electric guitar in about 1940.

=== 1942–1975: later years ===
In 1942, Charlie Glenn, the owner of the Rhumboogie Café, brought T-Bone Walker to Chicago for long stints in his club. In 1944 and 1945, Walker recorded for the Rhumboogie label, which was tied to the club, backed up by Marl Young's orchestra.

T-Bone Walker performed at the second famed Cavalcade of Jazz concert held at Wrigley Field in Los Angeles produced by Leon Hefflin Sr. on October 12, 1946. Jack McVea, Slim Gaillard, The Honeydrippers, Lionel Hampton and his Orchestra, and Louis Armstrong were also on the program. Walker performed for the third Cavalcade of Jazz concert held in the same location on September 7, 1947, along with Woody Herman as Emcee, The Valdez Orchestra, The Blenders, The Honeydrippers, Slim Gaillard, Johnny Otis and his Orchestra, Toni Harper, The Three Blazers, and Sarah Vaughan.

Much of his output was recorded from 1946 to 1948 for Black & White Records, including his most famous 1947 song, "Call It Stormy Monday (But Tuesday Is Just as Bad)". Other notable songs he recorded during this period were "Bobby Sox Blues" (a No. 3 R&B hit in 1947) and "West Side Baby" (No. 8 on the R&B singles chart in 1948).

Throughout his career Walker worked with top-notch musicians, including trumpeter Teddy Buckner (on "Call It Stormy Monday"), pianist Lloyd Glenn, bassist Billy Hadnott (on the LP Hot Leftovers and 1947's "Long Skirt Baby Blues"/"Good-Bye Blues"), and tenor saxophonist Jack McVea (on "Don't Leave Me Baby" and "No Worry Blues").

He recorded from 1950 to 1954 for Imperial Records (backed by Dave Bartholomew). Walker's only record in the next five years was T-Bone Blues, recorded during three widely separated sessions in 1955, 1956 and 1957 and released by Atlantic Records in 1959.

By the early 1960s, Walker's career had slowed down, in spite of an energetic performance at the American Folk Blues Festival in 1962 with the pianist Memphis Slim and the prolific writer and musician Willie Dixon, among others. However, several critically acclaimed albums followed, including I Want a Little Girl (Delmark Records, 1968). Walker recorded in his last years, from 1968 to 1975, for Robin Hemingway's music publishing company, Jitney Jane Songs. He won a Grammy Award for Best Ethnic or Traditional Folk Recording in 1970 for Good Feelin' while signed with Polydor Records, produced by Hemingway, followed by another album produced by Hemingway, Fly Walker Airlines, released in 1972.

== Death ==
Walker's career began to wind down after he suffered a stroke in 1974. He died at his home in Los Angeles of bronchial pneumonia following another stroke in March 1975, at the age of 64.

== Legacy ==
Walker was posthumously inducted into the Blues Hall of Fame in 1980 and the Rock and Roll Hall of Fame in 1987.

Chuck Berry named Walker and Louis Jordan as his main influences. B.B. King cited hearing Walker's recording of "Stormy Monday" as his inspiration for getting an electric guitar. In his 1996 autobiography, King commented that when he first heard Walker, he thought "Jesus himself had returned to earth playing electric guitar. T-Bone's blues filled my insides with joy and good feeling. I became his disciple. And remain so today. My biggest musical debt is to T-Bone." Blues-rock soloing pioneer Lonnie Mack named Walker his principal blues guitar influence. Walker was admired by Jimi Hendrix, who imitated Walker's trick of playing the guitar with his teeth. Steve Miller stated that in 1952, when he was 8, Walker taught him how to play his guitar behind his back and also with his teeth. Walker was a family friend and a frequent visitor to Miller's family home, and Miller considers him a major influence on his career. "Stormy Monday" was a favorite live number of the Allman Brothers Band. The British rock band Jethro Tull covered Walker's "Stormy Monday" in 1968 for John Peel's "Top Gear". Eva Cassidy performed "Stormy Monday" on her 1996 Live at Blues Alley recording.

Walker influenced generations of musicians. According to Cleveland.com, he may have been the best R&B guitarist. He "pioneered electric blues by becoming the first artist to make the electric guitar a solo instrument and a true centerpiece of his stunning live shows".

== Discography ==
=== As leader ===
==== Singles ====
- "Wichita Falls Blues" / "Trinity River Blues" (Columbia, 1929) as 'Oak Cliff T-Bone'
- "T-Bone Blues" (Varsity, 1940) with Les Hite And His Orchestra
- "Mean Old World" / "I Got a Break, Baby" (1942 [1945; 1948])
- "Evening" (1944)
- "Bobby Sox Blues" (1946)
- "I'm in an Awful Mood" (1946)
- "Call It Stormy Monday (But Tuesday Is Just as Bad)" (1947)
- "Long Skirt Baby Blues" / "Good-Bye Blues" (1947)
- "I Want a Little Girl" (1948)
- "West Side Baby" (1948)
- "T-Bone Shuffle" (1948)
- "Hypin' Women Blues" (1949)
- "Glamour Girl" / "Strollin' With Bones" (1950)
- "The Hustle is On" (1950)
- "Cold Cold Feeling" (1952)

==== Albums ====
- Classics in Jazz (Capitol [10"], 1954)
- T-Bone Blues (Atlantic, 1955/1956/1957 [1959])
- Sings the Blues (Imperial, 1960)
- I Get So Weary (Imperial, 1961)
- The Great Blues Vocals and Guitar of T-Bone Walker (His Original 1945-1950 Performances) (Capitol, 1963)
- "Hey Hey Baby" / "Should I Let Her Go" (Modern, 1965)
- The Truth (Brunswick, 1966 [1968]) also released as The Legendary T-Bone Walker
- Stormy Monday Blues (BluesWay, 1967)
- Funky Town (BluesWay, 1968)
- I Want a Little Girl (Delmark, 1968 [1973]) also released as Feelin' the Blues (Black & Blue)
- Good Feelin' (Polydor, 1968 [1969])
- Everyday I Have the Blues (BluesTime, 1969)
- Super Black Blues (BluesTime, 1969) with Big Joe Turner, Otis Spann
- Super Black Blues: Volume II [live] (BluesTime, 1970) with Leon Thomas, Eddie "Cleanhead" Vinson, Big Joe Turner
- Stormy Monday Blues (Wet Soul/SSS International, 1970 [1971])
- Fly Walker Airlines (Live in Montreux) (Polydor, 1972)
- Well Done (Home Cooking, 1973) also released as Back on the Scene: Texas 1966
- Very Rare (Reprise, 1973) 2-LP
- Hot Leftovers (Imperial [France], 1985)

=== As sideman ===
With Norman Granz Jazz At The Philharmonic

- J.A.T.P. in London, 1969 (Pablo, 1989) Double LP; Walker supplied three songs: "Woman You Must Be Crazy", "Goin' To Chicago", and "Stormy Monday"

With Jay McShann

- Confessin' the Blues (Black & Blue, 1970; Classic Jazz, 1978)

With Eddie "Cleanhead" Vinson

- Kidney Stew is Fine (Delmark, 1969) also released as Wee Baby Blues (Black & Blue)

With Jimmy Witherspoon

- Evenin' Blues (Prestige, 1963)

With various artists

- The Greatest Jazz Concert in the World (Pablo, 1967 [1975]) Four LP box set; Walker's tracks were "Woman You Must Be Crazy" and "Stormy Monday"
