= Funky Town (T-Bone Walker album) =

Studio album by T-Bone Walker
- Released: 1968
- Genre: Blues
- Length: 31:37
- Label: BluesWay
- Producer: Bob Thiele

T-Bone Walker chronology
Stormy Monday Blues (1968)	Funky Town (1968)	Good Feelin' (1969)

Professional ratings
Review scores
Source	Rating
AllMusic	3/5 stars
The Encyclopedia of Popular Music	3/5 stars
The Penguin Guide to Blues Recordings	2.5/4 stars

Funky Town is an album by blues guitarist and vocalist T-Bone Walker, released by the BluesWay label in 1968.

== Critical reception ==
The Encyclopedia of Popular Music wrote that the album "showcased a virtually undiminished talent, still capable of incisive playing."

== Track listing ==
All compositions by T-Bone Walker except where noted

1. "Goin' to Funky Town" – 5:02
2. "Party Girl" (Walker, E.J. White) – 3:04
3. "Why My Baby (Keep On Bothering Me)" – 2:53
4. "Jealous Woman" – 3:16
5. "Going to Build Me a Playhouse" (Walker, White) – 3:42
6. "Long Skirt Baby Blues" – 2:31
7. "Struggling Blues" (Walker, Grover McDaniel) – 3:50
8. "I'm in an Awful Mood" (Walker, McDaniel) – 4:19
9. "I Wish My Baby (Would Come Home At Night)" – 3:00

== Personnel ==
- T-Bone Walker – guitar, vocals
- Other musicians unidentified
