= Owen Husney =

American music manager (born 1947)

- Born: Owen Robert Husney; 8 September 1947 (age 79)
- Origin: Minneapolis, Minnesota, United States
- Occupations: Music manager
- Years active: 1965–present

Owen Robert Husney (born September 8, 1947) is an American music manager, musician, promoter, and record executive. Husney is known for his discovery and management of the artist Prince and Prince's 1977 signing to Warner Bros. Records—then one of the largest contracts for a new artist in history.

== Biography ==
=== Early life ===
Husney was born on September 8, 1947, in St. Louis Park, Minnesota. The son of Georgette Husney (née Cotlow; 1915–1987) and Irving Husney (1909–1988)—an immigrant from Aleppo, Syria—and the grandson of rabbinic judge Rabbi Eliyahu Husney.

=== The High Spirits ===
While a student at suburban-Minneapolis's St. Louis Park High School after playing in a band called The Treblemen and later The Jaguars with Randy Resnick in 1964, Husney, along with schoolmates Cliff Siegel and Rick Levinson, formed The High Spirits band. Husney played guitar and acted as the band's manager. With the addition of Doug Ahrens, Jay Luttio, and Rick Beresford, they recorded a garage rock version of Bobby "Blue" Bland's Turn On Your Love Light. The single received extensive airplay in on local Top 40 stations WDGY and KDWB, entering the top 10 locally, and eventually gained airplay in other markets including: Kansas, Colorado, Texas, and California.

The band's final performance was in July 1968, when Siegel headed off for military service.

=== Promotion and The Ad Company ===
Following the dissolution of The High Spirits, Husney began his career on the business side of the music industry by providing backstage catering to a local Minneapolis venue serving touring acts such as Janis Joplin, Stevie Wonder, The Rolling Stones, and The Who. Husney eventually rented The Marigold Ballroom in Minneapolis, a local art deco club and musical venue, acting as its promoter where he introduced local audiences to national acts including Bonnie Raitt, Billy Joel, Ry Cooder, and Foghat.

==== The Ad Company ====
In 1973, Husney formed The Ad Company, a retail advertising agency that served clientele including Warner Brothers and Doubleday-owned radio stations across the country. One of Husney's runners at The Ad Company was future Prince & The Revolution band member Bobby Z.

=== Signing Prince to Warner Bros. ===
In the summer of 1976, small studio owner Chris Moon brought Husney a demo tape by then eighteen-year-old Prince Nelson. Husney built a team around the young artist with the express purpose of making a new demo tape to secure a record contract for the young artist at a major record label, Husney used the resources of his advertising company to create promotional materials including a press kit to go along with a professionally recorded demo tape, recorded by then local engineer David Z at Sound 80 Studios in Minneapolis.

In the summer of 1977, Husney negotiated a three-album contract with Warner Bros., preserving Prince's publishing rights for himself and successfully convincing the record executives to allow Prince to produce his own first album. The contract was signed on June 25, 1977.

In 1980, Husney's management relationship with Prince ended when Prince signed with Bob Cavallo and Joe Ruffalo.

=== Record executive ===
Husney ran several record labels in association with Capitol Records, A&M Records and Sony. He also co-organized music for the John Hughes films, “The Breakfast Club” and “Pretty in Pink,” earning gold album awards for each.

=== Book ===
In 2018, Husney published Famous People Who've Met Me, an autobiographical book about his early days, discovering Prince, working with Al Jarreau and others. The publisher describes the book as a "collection of true stories starring oddball characters, behind the scenes gurus, scoundrels, and brilliant superstars in the music business straight out of Minnesota."

== See also ==
- André Cymone
- The High Spirits
- Al Jarreau
- Jesse Johnson
- Prince
- Ta Mara and the Seen
