= The High Spirits =

Garage rock band from Minneapolis, Minnesota

- Origin: Minneapolis, Minnesota, United States
- Genres: Garage rock, psychedelic rock
- Years active: 1964–1969
- Labels: Soma Records
- Members: Owen Husney, Doug Ahrens, Cliff Siegel, Jay Luttio, Rick Beresford, Rick Levinson

The High Spirits was a garage rock band from Minneapolis, Minnesota, active in the 1960s and signed with Soma Records. While there was a small rotation of members, the original line-up consisted of lead guitar/manager Owen Husney, drums Doug Ahrens, lead vocals Cliff Siegel, bass guitar Rick Beresford, rhythm guitar Rick Levinson, and Jay Luttio on keyboards. The band was among the Midwest groups that are credited with being the forefathers of the later punk rock scene.

Owen Husney later went on to discover and manage the artist, Prince as well as eleven other gold and platinum artists.

== Charts and awards ==
The group's first hit was a raveup of Bobby "Blue" Bland's "(Turn on Your) Love Light," recorded on May 7, 1965 and issued on Soma Records. The B side was "Tossin' and Turnin'," recorded at the same session. The record did well in the Twin Cities, and hit Number 1 in both Kansas City (the band performed in KC on two occasions) and Dallas during the fall of 1965, and also was beginning to do well in California and Colorado. A Top 40 chart from San Jose in September 1965 showed that the record was ranked Number 33 in that market.

Their second release was "I Believe" (not the Frankie Laine song), recorded on January 12, 1966 and released on Soma. It was written by rhythm guitar player Rick Levinson. The flip side, recorded at the same session, was "Bright Lights, Big City," a cover of a Jimmy Reed/The Animals tune.

In 2006, the band was inducted into the Minnesota Rock Country Hall of Fame for their contribution to music history.
