= Born in Mississippi, Raised Up in Tennessee =

Studio album by John Lee Hooker
- Released: 1973
- Recorded: September 28–29, 1971
- Studio: Wally Helder Recording, San Francisco, California, United States
- Genre: Blues
- Length: 40:13
- Language: English
- Label: ABC
- Producer: Ed Michel

John Lee Hooker chronology
Kabuki Wuki (1973)	Born in Mississippi, Raised Up in Tennessee (1973)	Free Beer and Chicken (1974)

Born in Mississippi, Raised Up in Tennessee is a 1973 studio album by American blues musician John Lee Hooker.

== Reception ==
Writing for The Sunday Times, Stewart Lee reviewed a 2014 re-release of this album and the 1972 live release Kabuki Wuki on CD, calling Born in Mississippi, Raised Up in Tennessee a "set marred by massed horns and backing vocalists, but sporting the superb nine minute 'How Many More Years You Gonna Dog Me ‘Round?'".

== Track listing ==
1. "Born in Mississippi, Raised Up in Tennessee" – 5:55
2. "How Many More Years You Gonna Dog Me 'Round?" – 5:31
3. "Going Down" – 8:10
4. "Younger Stud" – 8:34
5. "King of the World" – 6:06
6. "Tell Me You Love Me" – 5:57

== Personnel ==
"Born in Mississippi, Raised Up in Tennessee"

- John Lee Hooker – guitar, vocals
- George Bohanon – trombone
- Oscar Brashear – trumpet
- Cliff Coulter – electric melodica, guitar
- Robert Hooker – organ
- John Klemmer – tenor saxophone
- Don Menza – baritone saxophone
- Steven Miller – piano
- Gino Skaggs – Fender electric bass guitar
- Ken Swank – drums
- Luther Tucker – guitar

"How Many More Years You Gonna Dog Me 'Round"

- John Lee Hooker – guitar, vocals
- George Bohanon – trombone
- Oscar Brashear – trumpet
- Mel Brown – bass guitar
- Cliff Coulter – guitar
- Robert Hooker – electric piano
- John Klemmer – soprano saxophone with wah-wah and echoplex, tenor saxophone
- Don Menza – baritone saxophone
- Gino Skaggs – Fender electric bass guitar
- Ken Swank – drums
- Luther Tucker – guitar

"Going Down"

- John Lee Hooker – guitar, vocals
- Elvin Bishop – slide guitar
- Chuck Crimelli – drums
- Don "Sugarcane" Harris – violin
- Robert Hooker – organ
- Steven Miller – electric piano
- Van Morrison – guitar, vocals
- Mark Naftalin – piano
- Gino Skaggs – Fender electric bass guitar

"Younger Stud"

- John Lee Hooker – guitar, vocals
- Ron Beck – drums
- Cliff Coulter – electric piano
- Oma Drake – vocals
- Robert Hooker – organ
- John Kahn – Fender electric bass guitar
- Marti McCall – vocals
- Ray McCarty – guitar
- Mark Naftalin – piano
- Luther Tucker – guitar
- Michael White – violin
- Blinky Williams – vocals
- Paul Wood – guitar

"King of the World"

- John Lee Hooker – guitar, vocals
- Mel Brown – guitar
- Cliff Coulter – electric melodica
- Oma Drake – vocals
- Don "Sugarcane" Harris – violin
- Robert Hooker – electric piano
- Marti McCall – vocals
- Gino Skaggs – Fender electric bass guitar
- Ken Swank – drums
- Luther Tucker – guitar
- Blinky Williams – vocals

"Tell Me You Love Me"

- John Lee Hooker – guitar, vocals
- Ron Beck – drums
- George Bohanon – trombone
- Oscar Brashear – trumpet
- Cliff Coulter – electric piano
- Oma Drake – vocals
- John Klemmer – soprano and tenor saxophones
- Robert Hooker – organ
- Don Menza – baritone saxophone
- Marti McCall – vocals
- Benny Rowe – slide guitar
- Gino Skaggs – Fender electric bass guitar
- Luther Tucker – guitar
- Blinky Williams – vocals

Technical personnel

- Baker Bigsby – mixing at The Village Recorder, Los Angeles, California, United States (March 5–7, 1973)
- Gil Fortis – mixing assistance
- Ken Hopkins – engineering
- Al Kramer – front cover photography
- Dominic Lumetta – mixing assistance
- Ruby Mazur – design
- Phil Melnick – back cover photography
- Ed Michel – production
- Rick Stanley – engineering assistance
