= Larry Taylor =

American bassist (1942–2019)

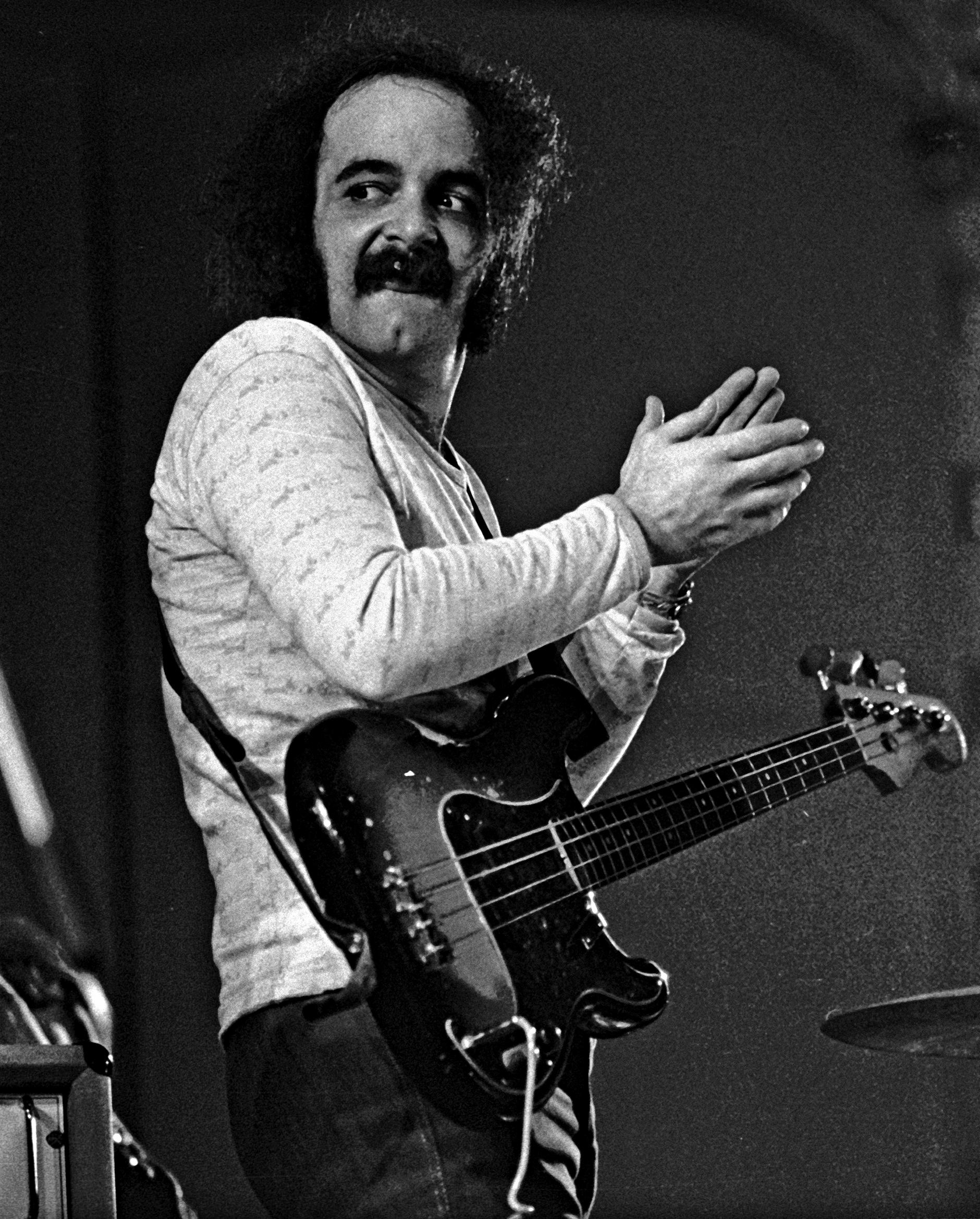
- Taylor in 1971

Background information
- Also known as: The Mole
- Born: Samuel Lawrence Taylor; June 26, 1942; New York City, U.S.
- Died: August 19, 2019 (aged 77) Lake Balboa, California, U.S.
- Genres: Rock, blues
- Occupation: Musician
- Instruments: Bass guitar, upright bass
- Years active: 1959–2019
- Formerly of: The Gamblers; Canned Heat; John Mayall & the Bluesbreakers; Pure Food and Drug Act
- Relatives: Mel Taylor (brother)

Samuel Lawrence Taylor (June 26, 1942 – August 19, 2019) was an American bass guitarist, best known for his work as a member of the blues rock band Canned Heat. Before joining Canned Heat, he had been a session bassist for the Monkees and Jerry Lee Lewis. He was the younger brother of Mel Taylor, longtime drummer of The Ventures.

== Early life ==
Taylor was born in New York City. His mother was Jewish and his father was a "WASP" from Tennessee. Taylor was the younger brother to Mel Taylor (1933-1996), drummer for The Ventures. As a boy, Taylor's family moved back and forth from Brooklyn and Tennessee. They also lived in Texas and California. While living in California, Taylor was sent by his mother back to Tennessee to join a mandatory Reserve Officers' Training Corps to punish him and teach him discipline as he was an "incorrigible" child.

In an interview, Taylor said he went to school for only a year before dropping out:

I did go to school for about a year and then I dropped out. I would just take my lunch money down to the local coffee shop and put it in the jukebox. They had the jukebox right on the counter. I would just plop down there, have a cup of coffee, put in a quarter and listen to ten songs. I would just soak up all the 50’s music which was going on at the time.

His first exposure to music was through brother Mel, who was a bluegrass guitarist at the time as opposed to the surf rock drummer he became known as. Like his brother, Larry originally played guitar. He switched to bass guitar after seeing local California musician Wesley Reynolds at the Sea Witch club. Taylor would later run away from home with Reynolds, and drove in his car to Oklahoma.

== Career ==
=== 1950s ===
Taylor played bass guitar in the Gamblers, one of the first rock groups to play instrumental surf music. Its personnel also included Elliot Ingber, a future member of Frank Zappa's Mothers of Invention, Fraternity of Man and Captain Beefheart's the Magic Band; Bruce Johnston, half of the Bruce and Terry duo with Terry Melcher from 1962–66 and longtime "sixth" member of the Beach Boys, for a time brother Mel Taylor, and guitarist-songwriter-bandleader Derry Weaver, who would record and perform in several capacities during the early 1960s. The Gamblers had a local hit in the Los Angeles area with "Moon Dawg" and Taylor played on the recording.

=== 1960s ===
Taylor played bass for Jerry Lee Lewis in 1961:

Some girl came into the Sea Witch (club) and told me that Jerry Lee Lewis was playing down the street at Jimmy Maddin’s Sundown Club on Sunset. She knew Jerry Lee somehow and told me he was looking for a bass player. She set up the introduction. I had to put on a suit to look presentable which at the time meant you had to wear a suit. We met. He hired me and I ended up going on the road with Jerry Lee Lewis.

Taylor played bass on the majority of the albums produced by the Monkees including; The Monkees (1966), More of the Monkees (1967), The Monkees Present (1969), Instant Replay (1969), and Changes (1970). He would play bass on their hit "Last Train to Clarksville."

Taylor was asked to join Canned Heat in 1967 after receiving a phone call from member Henry Vestine to join on bass. Taylor played with Canned Heat from 1967 to 1970, and appeared with them at various festivals including the Monterey International Pop Festival and Woodstock.

The band's manager, Skip Taylor, gave each member of the band a nickname connected to an animal. Larry's band nickname was "the Mole." In addition to playing bass, he also played lead guitar on occasion. An example can be heard on the track "Down in the Gutter, But Free", on the album Hallelujah.

=== 1970s ===
In 1970, when John Mayall moved to Los Angeles, Taylor and Mandel quit Canned Heat to join him in the Bluesbreakers. Taylor served the longest tenure as a member of the Bluesbreakers in the 1970s (1970–1977). After the Bluesbreakers tours in 1977, Taylor played briefly with the Sugarcane Harris Band (later called Pure Food and Drug Act).

In 1972, Larry joined his brother Mel's band to play on the Ventures album Rock and Roll Forever. Canned Heat member Harvey "the Snake" Mandel also played on the album.

In 1974, Taylor became part of the Hollywood Fats Band led by Mike "Hollywood Fats" Mann. The pair joined Canned Heat for a King Biscuit Flower Hour concert in 1979. The bands history started around 1973/1974 when Hollywood Fats met Al Blake, Fred Kaplan, Jerry Smith and George "Harmonica" Smith, who were the touring members for Muddy Waters at the time. Fats was invited to be Water's sideman. Fats soon invited Taylor to replace Smith, and the band started touring as "the Hollywood Fats band". It was the first professional band Taylor played upright bass in. Taylor and Fats also returned to Canned Heat for two years (1978-1980). The Hollywood Fats band ended when Fats died tragically of a heart attack in 1986, aged 32.

When he left John Mayall in 1977, Taylor started studying playing upright bass. Taylor became a leading exponent and practitioner of the acoustic upright bass in the contemporary blues scene. He was quite prominently seen with his upright bass in the live blues film, Lightning in a Bottle. He started playing upright bass with Rod Piazza, eventually cutting ties with him when Honey Piazza started getting involved as he thought that "she couldn't play" and "she was horrible".

=== 1980s–2010s ===
Taylor returned to Canned Heat again for five years in 1987. Taylor recorded Reheated in 1988, again with Canned Heat. He also briefly toured with them again from 1996 to 1997.

In 2002, the surviving members of the Hollywood Fats band reformed. Not wanting to be a ghost band, they changed the name to "Hollywood Blue Flames".

Taylor performing in Madrid, 2010

In 2010, Taylor and Mandel reunited with Adolfo "Fito" de la Parra and the rest of the current Canned Heat lineup to perform certain shows. Taylor, Mandel and de la Parra were all in the lineup that played Woodstock. The three members of Canned Heat's Woodstock line-up toured extensively from 2010 to 2014.

He was featured in a concert DVD released in winter 2013, from the album Time Brings About A Change by Floyd Dixon. This concert features three elder piano players – Dixon, Pinetop Perkins and Henry Gray — and was filmed at the Rhythm Room in Phoenix, Arizona, on 1 and 2 June 2006.

Taylor played on numerous Tom Waits albums and was the bass player in his touring band. He appeared with Waits on Late Night with Conan O'Brien, The Tonight Show, Late Show with David Letterman (in 2012) and a show hosted by Jon Stewart. He played on ten of Waits' studio albums released between 1980 and 2011.

In 2014, Taylor was nominated for a Blues Music Award in the 'Best Instrumentalist – Bass' category.

== Death ==
Larry Taylor died at his home in Lake Balboa, Los Angeles on August 19, 2019 at the age of 77 after twelve years of cancer treatment. He was survived by his wife Andrea and their three children.

Tom Waits remembered Taylor by writing on his website:

Everything that Larry was... knowing, hilarious, obstinate, short fused, direct and unflinching in his complaints and opinions... is there in the dig-into-it rhythms of his playing. We fought. I can't tell you how many times he threw the bass down in disgust, proclaiming, "I am not feeling it. I can't play this shit", only to be coaxed back into the song and not only playing it, but helping to define it. When you heard him say, "yeah, this is the real shit", you felt a perverse sense of pride and satisfaction. We will miss you Larry, and we love you. Tom, Kathleen and family.

== Discography ==
With the Monkees

- The Monkees (1966)
- More of the Monkees (1967)
- Instant Replay (1969)
- The Monkees Present (1969)
- Changes (1970)
- Listen to the Band (1991)
- Greatest Hits (1995)
- Missing Links, Vol. 3 (1996)
- Anthology (1998)
- Music Box (2001)

With Canned Heat
(See full discography at Canned Heat discography)

With John Mayall

- Empty Rooms (1969)
- USA Union (1970)
- Back to the Roots (1971)
- Memories (1971)
- Jazz Blues Fusion (1972)
- Moving On (1973)
- Latest Edition (1974)
- New Year, New Band, New Company (1975)
- Notice to Appear (1975)
- Banquet in Blues (1976)
- Lots of People (1977)
- Archives to Eighties (1988)
- Rock the Blues Tonight (1999)

With Harvey Mandel

- Games Guitars Play (1970)
- Baby Batter (1971)
- Electronic Progress (1971)
- Snake (1972)
- Mercury Years (1995)

With Tom Waits

- Heartattack and Vine (1980)
- Swordfishtrombones (1983)
- Rain Dogs (1985)
- Franks Wild Years (1987)
- Bone Machine (1992)
- Mule Variations (1999) Gold Record Award
- Alice (2002)
- Blood Money (2002)
- Real Gone (2004)
- Bad as Me (2011)

With others

- Test Patterns (Boyce & Hart, 1967)
- Slim's Got His Thing Goin' On' (Sunnyland Slim, 1969)
- Fiddler on the Rock (Don "Sugarcane" Harris, 1971)
- Lost Session (Albert King, 1971)
- Mudlark (Leo Kottke, 1971)
- Rock And Roll Forever (The Ventures, 1972)
- The Devil's Harmonica (Shakey Jake Harris, 1972)
- Cup Full of Dreams (Don "Sugarcane" Harris, 1974)
- Summit Meeting (Free Creek, 1976)
- I'm a Southern Man (Louis Myers, 1978)
- Hollywood Fats Band (Mike „Hollywood Fats“ Mann, 1979)
- Rock This House (Mike „Hollywood Fats“ Mann, 1979)
- Anthology Previously Unreleased Material (The Grandmothers, 1980)
- Rock Therapy (Colin Winski, 1980)
- The Other Side of Town (Chuck E. Weiss, 1981)
- Hard Line (The Blasters, 1985)
- Harpburn (Rod Piazza, 1986)
- Best (Leo Kottke, 1987)
- Kristen Vigard (Kristen Vigard, 1988)
- The Healer (John Lee Hooker, 1989)
- Keith Levene's Violent Opposition (Keith Levene, 1989)
- Mr. Lucky (John Lee Hooker, 1991)
- Got Love If You Want It (John P. Hammond, 1992)
- Trespass (Ry Cooder, 1992)
- In My Time (Charlie Musselwhite, 1992)
- Mother of an Anthology (The Grandmothers, 1993)
- That's Life (Kim Wilson, 1994)
- My New Orleans Soul (Ronnie Barron, 1994)
- Long Overdue (Junior Watson, 1994)
- Trouble No More (John P. Hammond, 1994)
- Martinis & Bikinis (Sam Phillips, 1994)
- Blues for Thought (Terry Evans, 1994)
- Closer to You (J. J. Cale, 1994)
- To Love (Randy Resnick, 1994)
- Working Girl Blues (Phillip Walker, 1995)
- 88th Street Blues (Smokey Wilson, 1995)
- Adventures at Catfish Pond (Bob "Catfish" Hodge, 1996)
- Rough News (Charlie Musselwhite, 1997)
- Lost in America (Lynwood Slim, 1997)
- Mr. Blake's Blues (Al Blake, 1997)
- My Blues (Kim Wilson, 1997)
- Signifyin' (Fred Kaplan, 1997)
- Back to Back (Lynwood Slim, 1998)
- Lookin for Trouble (Edward Taylor, 1998)
- Jump Children! (Finis Tasby, 1998)
- New Depths (The Ventures, 1998)
- Soul Disguise (Cesar Rosas, 1999)
- Zero Zero Zero: The Best of Sam Phillips (Sam Phillips, 1999)
- Something Good for Your Head (Blackburn & Snow, 1999)
- I'm Going All the Way (Peggy Pruitt, 2000)
- I Can Tell (Junior Valentine, 2000)
- World Wide Wood (Lynwood Slim, 2000)
- Mo' Na'Kins, Please! (James Harman, 2000)
- The Toughest Girl Alive (Candye Kane, 2000)
- West Coast House Party (Kid Ramos, 2000)
- There's a Song in There (Mark DuFresne, 2000)
- Fool's Paradise (Dale Hawkins, 2000)
- Wicked Grin (John P. Hammond, 2001)
- Smokin' Joint (Kim Wilson, 2001)
- "You Can Make It If You Try" (Gene Allison, 2002)
- Sky Like a Broken Clock (Kelly Joe Phelps, 2001)
- Beggar's Oil (Kelly Joe Phelps, 2002)
- Harmonica Blues Orgy (Easy Baby, 2002)
- Magic Soul Elixer (Al Blake, 2002)
- Let It Rain (Tracy Chapman, 2002)
- Whole Lotta Love (Candye Kane, 2003)
- You've Never Seen Everything (Bruce Cockburn, 2003)
- Heart Trouble (Wanda Jackson, 2003)
- Villanelle (Paul Reddick, 2004)
- Fernando Ortega (Fernando Ortega, 2004)
- Think About It (Alex Schultz, 2004)
- Soul Sanctuary (Hollywood Blue Flames, 2005)
- Southern Jumbo (Colin Linden, 2005)
- Time Brings About a Change... A Floyd Dixon Celebration (Floyd Dixon, 2006)
- Hell Under the Skullbones (Graham Lindsey, 2006)
- Spooked (Marley's Ghost, 2006)
- Road to Rio (Hollywood Blue Flames, 2006)
- Can't Quit the Blues (Buddy Guy, 2006)
- Shower Some Love (Layni Kooper, 2007)
- Luminous (Chris Murphy, 2007)
- Big Plans (Mannish Boys, 2007)
- Like a Fire (Solomon Burke, 2008)
- Bluelisted (JW-Jones, 2008)
- Rusty Zinn & The Roadmasters, Featuring Kim Wilson (Rusty Zinn) (2008)
- Midnight Memphis Sun (JW-Jones, 2010)
- Definitive Albert King on Stax (Albert King, 2011)
- New World Generation (New World Generation, 2011)
- Driftin' From Town To Town (Barrelhouse Chuck & Kim Wilson's Blues All Stars (2013)
- Blues And Boogie (Kim Wilson) (2017)
