= Harvey Mandel =

American guitarist (born 1945)

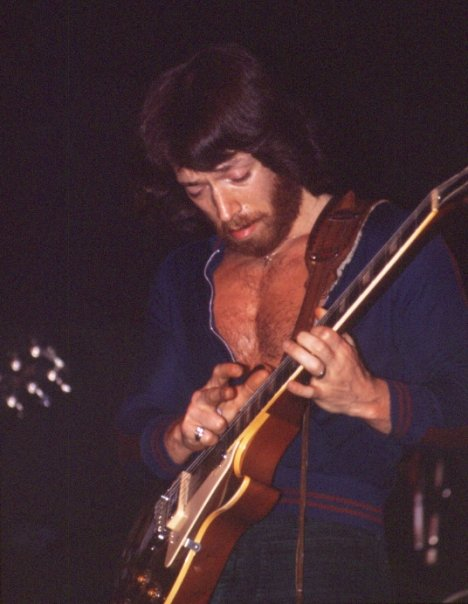
- Mandel performing in 1977

Background information
- Born: March 11, 1945 (age 81); Detroit, Michigan, U.S.
- Origin: Morton Grove, Illinois, U.S.
- Genres: Rock, blues, blues rock
- Occupation: Musician
- Instrument: Guitar
- Years active: 1966–present
- Labels: Epic, Philips, Bellaphon, Janus, Repertoire, BGO, Ovation, Western Front, Clarity, Lightyear, Orchard, Electric Snake, Wide Hive, Tompkins Square
- Formerly of: Pure Food and Drug Act, Canned Heat, John Mayall Band
- Website: www.harveymandel.com

Harvey "The Snake" Mandel (born March 11, 1945) is an American guitarist best known as a member of Canned Heat. He also played with Charlie Musselwhite and John Mayall as well as maintaining a solo career.

== Early life ==
Mandel was born in Detroit, Michigan, and grew up in Morton Grove, Illinois, a suburb of Chicago.

== Career ==
His first recording was the album Stand Back! Here Comes Charley Musselwhite's Southside Band in 1966 with Charlie Musselwhite. Described in Legends of Rock Guitar (1997) as a "legendary" album, it was influential with Mandel's "relentless fuzztone, feedback-edged solos, and unusual syncopated phrasing." He relocated to the San Francisco Bay area, performing often at The Matrix, a club where local favorites like Jerry Garcia or Elvin Bishop would sit in and jam. He then met the pioneering San Francisco disc jockey and producer Abe "Voco" Kesh (Abe Keshishian), who signed Mandel to Philips Records and produced his first solo album, Cristo Redentor, in 1968. Mandel recorded with Barry Goldberg on a bootleg from Cherry Records and recorded with Graham Bond. He cut two more solo LPs for Philips, Righteous (1969) and Games Guitars Play (1970), followed by four more solo albums for the independent record label Janus in the early 1970s, which included Baby Batter.

On the night that Henry Vestine quit Canned Heat, Mandel was in the band's dressing room at the Fillmore West. Mike Bloomfield joined them for the first set, and Mandel came in for the second set. His third performance with the band was the Woodstock Festival in 1969. During this period, with Canned Heat bandmates Larry Taylor and Fito de la Parra, Mandel contributed to the 'Music from Free Creek' super session project. Mandel stayed with Canned Heat for a year, touring and recording material which appeared on three albums. "Let's Work Together", a song by Wilbert Harrison which was included in the album Future Blues became an international hit. He is also on the Live in Europe album recorded prior to the death of Alan Wilson.

With Canned Heat bassist Larry Taylor, Mandel joined John Mayall's band for the next two years. He is heard playing on the two albums from that period USA Union and Back to the Roots. In 1972, he teamed up with Don "Sugarcane" Harris, Randy Resnick on guitar, Victor Conte on bass, and Paul Lagos on drums to form the band Pure Food and Drug Act, which released one album, Choice Cuts. During the 1970s Mandel released the albums Baby Batter (1970), The Snake (1972), Feel the Sound of Harvey Mandel (1974) and Shangrenade (1973), in the latter employing the technique of two-handed tapping. He also released an instructional video, Harvey Mandel: Blues Guitar & Beyond.

When Rolling Stones guitarist Mick Taylor left the band, Mandel was given an audition as his replacement. He recorded two tracks with the Stones for their 1976 album Black and Blue: "Hot Stuff" (providing the lead guitar solo throughout) and "Memory Motel".

Mandel acted in the 1996 film Chalk playing a surfer, which was directed by Rob Nilsson.

Post-1976

Harvey Mandel and the Snake Crew was released in 2006. Notable guest performers included Elvin Bishop, Norton Buffalo, Marcy Levy, and Nick Gravenites, plus Freddie Roulette, Pete Sears, Peter Albin, Mic Gillette, Barry Goldberg and Howard Wales. Live at Biscuits & Blues followed in 2009.

In 2009, Mandel and Larry Taylor reunited with Fito de la Parra and the rest of the current Canned Heat lineup to perform certain shows on the Canned Heat tour. Taylor, Mandel and de la Parra had all been part of the 1969 Woodstock Festival lineup. Mandel rejoined Canned Heat permanently in 2010.

In 2014, Harvey collaborated with the herbalist Ron Teeguarden on an album titled Dragons at Play, which consisted of nine tracks.

In 2015, Cleopatra Records issued a six-disc retrospective of Harvey's career featuring the first five of Harvey's solo albums, and a sixth disc containing a live performance from the Matrix Club in San Francisco, on December 24, 1968. The performance included Jerry Garcia, and Elvin Bishop.

In 2016, Harvey, along with Ryley Walker's backing band, entered the recording studios at Fantasy Records, Berkeley, for two days of live studio recording, which resulted in the eight self-composed tracks which made up the album Snake Pit.

In 2017, Harvey released the 10 track album Snake Attack. According to Harvey, "I wrote all the songs, performed all the instruments and mixed and mastered all the songs myself. Working in my own home studio allowed me to do all sorts of great guitar overdubs that I'd never have been able to do in a regular studio.

2022 saw the release of Who's Calling.

== Discography ==
=== Solo ===
- 1968 Cristo Redentor (LP, Philips PHS 600-281)
- 1969 Righteous (LP, Philips PHS 600-306)
- 1970 Games Guitars Play (LP, Philips PHS 600-325)
- 1971 Baby Batter (LP, Janus JLS-3017), also released as Electronic Progress (Bellaphon, Germany)
- 1972 The Snake (LP, Janus JLS-3037), with Don "Sugarcane" Harris
- 1972 Get Off in Chicago (LP, Ovation OV/1415)
- 1973 Shangrenade (LP, Janus JLS-3047), with Don "Sugarcane" Harris
- 1974 Feel the Sound of Harvey Mandel (LP, Janus JLS-3067)
- 1975 The Best of Harvey Mandel (LP, Janus 7014)
- 1993 Twist City (CD, Western Front WFE 10022)
- 1995 Snakes & Stripes (CD, Clarity Recordings CCD-1013)
- 1995 Harvey Mandel: The Mercury Years (Includes first 3 solo albums) (CD, PolyGram Records 314 528275-2)
- 1997 Planetary Warrior (CD, ESP/Lightyear/WEA, 54215-2)
- 1997 Emerald Triangle (CD, Electric Snake Productions ESP-9701)
- 1999 Snake Live (CD, MP3.com)
- 2000 West Coast Killers (Contains two bonus tracks not on the 2003 "West Coast Killaz" CD) (CD, MP3.com)
- 2000 Lick This (CD, Electric Snake Productions)
- 2003 West Coast Killaz (10-track CD also issued as 8-track "Radio Version") (CD, Electric Snake Productions)
- 2003 NightFire featuring Harvey Mandel/Freddie Roulette (CD, Electric Snake Productions NF1470)
- 2004 Blue Marble (CDr, Unreleased Studio w/ Terry Haggerty in possession of collector)
- 2006 Harvey Mandel and the Snake Crew (CD, Electric Snake Productions)
- 2009 Live at Biscuits & Blues (CD, Electric Snake Productions)
- 2014 Dragons at Play (CD, Electric Snake Productions)
- 2015 Snake Box (Includes first five solo albums plus "Live at the Matrix", San Francisco, CA, December 24, 1968) (CD, Cleopatra CLP-CD-2100)
- 2016 Snake Pit (CD, Tompkins Square TSQ 5296)
- 2017 Snake Attack (CD, RockBeat Records ROC-3357)
- 2018 Live at Broadway Studios, San Francisco (CD, RockBeat Records ROC-3366)
- 2019 Smoke This (CD, Out The Box Records)
- 2022 Who's Calling (CD, Tompkins Square TSQ 5920)
- 2024 Twist City (2024 Remaster) (Digital Download, Cleopatra CLO6487DA)
- 2025 Snake Walk (CD, Earwig EWR-4985)

=== With other artists ===
- 1967 Stand Back! Here Comes Charley Musselwhite's Southside Band (Vanguard) – Charlie Musselwhite
- 1968 There's No Hole in My Soul (Buddah) – Barry Goldberg
- 1969 Two Jews Blues (Buddah) – Barry Goldberg and Mike Bloomfield
- 1970 Woodstock: Music from the Original Soundtrack and More (Cotillion) – various artists (with Canned Heat)
- 1970 '70 Concert: Recorded Live in Europe (Liberty) – Canned Heat
- 1970 Future Blues (Liberty) – Canned Heat
- 1970 USA Union (Polydor) – John Mayall
- 1971 Back to the Roots (Polydor) – John Mayall
- 1971 Historical Figures and Ancient Heads (United Artists) – Canned Heat
- 1972 Choice Cuts (Epic) – Pure Food and Drug Act
- 1973 Music from Free Creek (Charisma) – various artists
- 1974 Reel to Real (RSO) – Love
- 1976 Black and Blue (Rolling Stones) – The Rolling Stones
- 1994 The Psychedelic Guitar Circus (Rykodisc) – Henry Kaiser, Steve Kimock, Harvey Mandel, Freddie Roulette

== Bibliography ==
- Fito De La Parra, Living the Blues (2000), ISBN 0-9676449-0-9
