= Live at Soledad Prison =

Live album by John Lee Hooker
- Released: 1972
- Recorded: June 11, 1972
- Venues: Soledad Prison, California
- Genre: Blues
- Length: 39:30
- Label: ABC
- Producer: Ed Michel

John Lee Hooker chronology
| Never Get Out of These Blues Alive (1972) | Live at Soledad Prison (1972) | Born in Mississippi, Raised Up in Tennessee (1973) |

Live at Soledad Prison is a live album by blues musician John Lee Hooker recorded at the Soledad State Prison in Monterey County, California on June 11, 1972 and released by the ABC label later that year. It is not available in its original form on compact disc, but in 1996, MCA Records released a compilation of Hooker's 1966 live album Live at Cafe Au Go Go with the last five songs of Live at Soledad Prison, under the title Live at the Café au Go-Go (and Soledad Prison).

== Background and performance ==
ABC Records executive Ed Michel suggested having Hooker perform at Soledad, with the intention of releasing a live album of the performance. In the years prior, other artists had performed or recorded prison concerts, most notably Frank Sinatra and Count Basie at San Quentin, and Johnny Cash at Folsom Prison.

John Lee Hooker Sr. had brought his 20-year-old son, John Lee Hooker Jr. to California, in part to "...get that boy out of Detroit". Hooker Jr. had recently been released from prison in Michigan after having been incarcerated for drug offenses. Hooker Jr. later recalled "It was just me leaving one yard and moving to another yard... The only difference was I was free and I was able to walk out of the yard."

Hooker Jr. performed the first two songs on the album, before introducing his father for the next five.

The closing track of the album, and the closing song of the concert, Bang Bang Bang Bang, was a reworking of Hooker's 1961 standard Boom Boom. Four minutes and 17 seconds into the song, it abruptly ends when the power goes out. Hooker Jr. has conflicting recollections as to whether or not it was due to the prison guards cutting the power to do head count.

== Hooker Jr.'s further experiences at Soledad ==
In the mid-1980s, Hooker Jr. (by this time a California resident) had continued troubles with drug-related offenses, and was sentenced to serve two years at Soledad Prison. He again served two years at Soledad in 1991 for a separate drug offense. During that period of time, he converted to Christianity. Hooker Jr. went on to pursue treatment for his addiction, and eventually became an ordained minister. He served as a prison chaplain at several California prisons, including Soledad.

== Reception ==
Professional ratings
Review scores
| Source | Rating |
|---|---|
| AllMusic | 3/5 stars |

AllMusic reviewer Richie Unterberger, referring to the Cafe Au Go-Go/Soledad compilation, stated: "Luther Tucker is one of the guitarists for the Soledad portion, which has a somewhat more electric, rock-oriented sound than the Au Go-Go material".

== Track listing ==
All compositions credited to John Lee Hooker except where noted

1. "Superlover" – 4:07
2. "I'm Your Crosscut Saw" (Traditional, arranged by John Lee Hooker Jr.) – 5:16
3. "What's The Matter Baby" – 3:35
4. "Lucille" – 6:36
5. "Boogie Everywhere I Go" – 8:24
6. "Serve Me Right to Suffer" – 7:15
7. "Bang Bang Bang Bang" – 4:17

== Personnel ==
- John Lee Hooker – guitar, vocals
- Charlie Grimes, Luther Tucker – guitar
- Lex Silver – Fender bass
- Ken Swank – drums
- John Lee Hooker Jr. – vocals (tracks 2 & 5)
