= Randy Resnick =

American guitarist and saxophonist

Randy 'Rare' Resnick
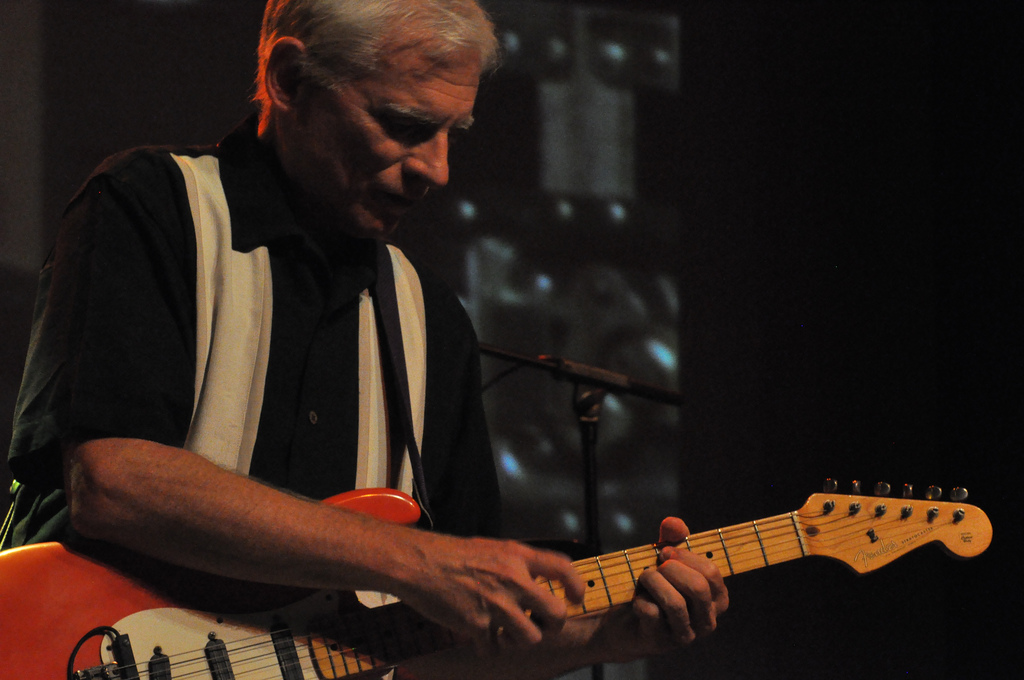
- Resnick Avignon Blues Festival with Canned Heat, 2012

Background information
- Also known as: Randy Rare
- Born: Randy Resnick; Minneapolis, Minnesota, United States
- Genres: Rock and roll, blues rock, blues, funk, jazz, ambient music
- Occupation: musician
- Instruments: electric guitar, upright bass, saxophone
- Years active: 1965–present
- Labels: Epic Records, MPS Records, Polydor Records, Each Hit Music
- Website: https://RandyResnick.com

Randy Resnick is an American guitarist, songwriter and saxophonist who has played with many prominent blues and jazz musicians, such as Don "Sugarcane" Harris, John Lee Hooker, John Mayall, Canned Heat and Freddie King. He was developing both one- and two-handed tapping style in the early 1970s. He published a CD of his own music in 1995, "To Love" under the name Randy Rare. There is an example of his tapping work in the recording from that CD below. In 2020, he began publishing new music, much of it on saxophone, on the streaming platforms like Spotify, Tidal (service) and iTunes under his own Each Hit label.

== Career ==
Resnick was born in Minneapolis, Minnesota. Having music in his family (brother Art Resnick was an accomplished jazz and classical pianist and composer) he began his career playing in Minneapolis clubs and concerts in 1966, moving to Los Angeles in 1968. There he met drummer Paul Lagos who was working for the band, Kaleidoscope. Lagos eventually introduced Resnick to Canned Heat bassist Larry Taylor and violin player Don "Sugarcane" Harris. The four musicians formed a band called Pure Food and Drug Act, based on Sugarcane's blues/jazz violin and singing. It was during this period that he developed his tapping technique. Victor Conte replaced Taylor on electric bass after a few concert gigs. Victor Conte went on to play with Tower of Power, along with guitarist Bruce Conte, his cousin, and then for Herbie Hancock in his Monster Band. Sugarcane Harris died in 1999 in California. Paul Lagos died on October 19, 2009, in Minneapolis, Minnesota. Victor Conte died from pancreatic cancer at home in San Mateo, California on November 3, 2025, at the age of 75.

After quitting the PFDA, Resnick went on to play with John Mayall and recorded the album The Latest Edition, with Larry Taylor on bass, Red Holloway, a seasoned jazz player on sax and flute, Soko Richardson, former Ike and Tina Turner drummer, and Hi Tide Harris sharing the guitar spotlight with a contrasting, simpler bluesy style. This band toured Europe and Asia in 1974. Although the musicians were all talented, the material was lackluster and the album did not sell. He then went on to tour with John Klemmer. Resnick has retired several times, disappearing for 6 to 8 years and resurfacing in strange places like Bordeaux, France, where he now lives, and plays his music with a trio based in Paris, France, as well and playing saxophone wherever possible. As of March–July 2021, few if any live gigs are possible.

Return to the concert stage, October 2012: Canned Heat leader Fito de la Parra called Resnick to replace Harvey Mandel, who had to fly back to California for a family emergency. He played two dates of the Canned Heat European tour in Bergerac, France on October 4 and Avignon, France October 5th, but was unable to play the rest of the dates because of a prior commitment.

Resnick was mentioned in the Eddie Van Halen biography for his contribution to the tapping guitar technique and by Lee Ritenour in the January 1980 Guitar Player Magazine, who saw Resnick use the tapping technique in 1974 at the Whisky a Go Go with the Richard Greene Group. The legendary Ted Greene, from whom Resnick took one lesson, spoke of his tapping technique in an interview given shortly before his death. Greene said in that interview that he "considered Sawyer, along with Jay Graydon and Randy Resnick, one of the real legends of the L.A. guitar scene".

In 1965, while working at B-Sharp, a local musical instrument shop, he presented George Harrison of The Beatles with a Rickenbacker 12-string guitar during their 1965 US tour. Photos of this presentation at the press conference were published in photographer Bill Carlson's book "The Beatles!: A One-night Stand in the Heartland".

Longtime friend Owen Husney, who discovered Prince and signed him to Warner Brothers, mentions Randy's guitar influence in his 2018 book "Famous People Who've Met Me". It's just possible that Owen wouldn't have discovered Prince had he not split from the band he played in with Randy.

In a 2020 Guitar World interview, John Mayall, asked to name three guitarists who played with him mentioned Buddy Whittington and Eric Clapton, and added,

"I’d also have to give a nod here to another favorite of mine who is not that well known, Randy Resnick. He had a remarkable style that enhanced all of the songs we played, and took me to new places."

In a 2021 Guitar World article, Andy Aledort wrote, "Examples of the tapping on electric guitar can be found throughout the 20th century, such as late-'60s guitarist Randy Resnick’s attempt to approximate saxophone great John Coltrane’s “sheets of sound” in his work with John Mayall."

In March 2025, Andrew Daly wrote "After playing alongside Harvey Mandel, Resnick would go on to follow in the footsteps of Eric Clapton and Peter Green in blues legend John Mayall’s band – and win plaudits from Lee Ritenour and Ted Greene"

Other mentions include All Music Guide to rock, Rolling Stone Encyclopedia of Rock and Roll, Billboard Magazine, Jul 29, 1972, The Jazz Discography Volume 9, Cadence, Vol 21, John Mayall: The Blues Crusader

== Discography ==
With Pure Food and Drug Act

- Choice Cuts (Epic, 1972)

With John Mayall

- Latest Edition (Polydor, 1974)

=== As leader ===
- To Love (Resmo, 1995)
- Trash Hitz (Each Hit Music, 2021)
- Soul for Rent (Each Hit Music, 2022)
- Summer 2023 (Each Hit Music, 2023)
- Come Together (Each Hit Music, 2023)
- Blue Jazz Heavenly Grill (Each Hit Music, 2024)
- A & R (with Alex Nyman, Each Hit Music, 2024)
- Affinity (with Brazilian guitarist Marcio Riscado, 2024)
- Influences (Each Hit Music, 2024)
- Rock 'n Blues (Each Hit Music, 2024)
- Lockdown Jazz (Each Hit Music, 2024)
- An Intercontinental Jam (Each Hit Music, 2024)
- Human Music (Each Hit Music, 2025)

=== As sideman ===
- Don "Sugarcane" Harris, Fiddler on the Rock (MPS, 1971)
- Don "Sugarcane" Harris, Cup Full of Dreams (MPS, 1973)
- Don "Sugarcane" Harris, Sugarcane's Got the Blues (MPS, 1973)
- Don "Sugarcane" Harris, I'm on Your Case (MPS, 1973)
- Harvey Mandel, The Snake (Janus, 1972)
- John Mayall, Latest Edition (Polydor, 1974)
- Roberta Davis, For the Record (Cookhouse, 1975)
- Freddy Roulette, Sweet Funky Steel (Reissue, 1993)
- Robin Lee Field, Not Mainstream (Trigger Blue, 2025)
