= Pure Food and Drug Act (band) =

American blues rock band

- Harvey Mandel, Paul Lagos, Victor Conte, Don Sugarcane Harris, Randy Resnick (L to R)

Background information
- Genres: Blues rock
- Years active: 1969–1973
- Past members: Don "Sugarcane" Harris; Paul Lagos; Larry Taylor; Randy Resnick; Harvey Mandel; Victor Conte

Pure Food and Drug Act was an American blues rock band that was formed in 1969 by Don "Sugarcane" Harris. The band began with Paul Lagos on drums, Larry Taylor on bass and Randy Resnick on guitar. Resnick was at that time experimenting with a one and two handed tapping technique which later became a standard guitarist's tool. The group played small rooms in the Los Angeles area, such as the Troubadour and the Ash Grove, for several months.

While the band was searching for a record deal, Larry Taylor allegedly began to tire of Don's constant lateness and irresponsibility and decided to continue his career with John Mayall. At the same time, Harvey Mandel, a Charlie Musselwhite, Canned Heat and Mayall alumnus, was brought in to beef up the accompaniment and to stimulate record label interest, as he already had a following from his Chicago blues days. To replace Taylor on bass, a relative newcomer, Victor Conte, was recruited from Common Ground, a funk band in Fresno that Resnick had played in. Conte went on to play in Tower of Power and with Herbie Hancock in his Monster Band.

Choice Cuts was the band's only album, recorded live in Seattle in 1972, but it was mostly unsuccessful. Allegedly because of Don's unreliable nature, the band rarely rehearsed. Live performances included extended solos and improvized ensemble sections, and one song would often last 20 minutes or more. Various lineup changes took place until the band broke up a few years after releasing its first album.
