= Pacific Gas and Electric (album) =

Studio album by Pacific Gas & Electric
- Released: 1969
- Genres: Soul-rock; blues rock; psychedelic rock; jazz rock; blues; jazz
- Length: 41:33
- Label: Columbia Records
- Producer: John Hill

Pacific Gas & Electric chronology
Get It On (1968)	Pacific Gas and Electric (1969)	Are You Ready? (1970)

Singles from Pacific Gas and Electric
- 1. "Bluesbuster"/"Redneck" Released: October 17, 1969

Pacific Gas and Electric is an album by Pacific Gas & Electric released in 1969. It reached #91 on the Billboard Top LPs chart. The album was the first PG&E release on Columbia Records, having been signed after their performance at the Miami Pop Festival in May 1968.

One single came from the album, "Bluesbuster", but it did not chart on the Billboard Hot 100. The song was featured on the 1970 sampler album, Fill Your Head with Rock.

== Critical reception ==
Professional ratings
Review scores
Source	Rating
AllMusic	3/5 stars
The Village Voice	A−

In a contemporary review for The Village Voice, Robert Christgau regarded Pacific Gas and Electric as "a pleasant surprise" whose "first side rocks like hell and despite some nonsense with drums and '30s jazz arrangements, even the second can be played over and over."

== Track listing ==
1. "Bluesbuster" (Charlie Allen) – 2:55
2. "Death Row #172" (Charlie Allen, John Hill) – 3:59
3. "Miss Lucy" (Charlie Allen) – 2:28
4. "My Women" (Charlie Allen, Tom Marshall) – 5:38
5. "She's Long and She's Tall" (John Lee Hooker) – 6:20
6. "PG&E Suite: The Young Rabbits/Constitutional Strand/Fat Tom/Boy Wonder" (Brent Block, Tom Marshall, Glenn Schwartz) – 16:41
7. "Redneck" (Joe South) – 3:32

== Personnel ==
Adapted from Discogs.

- John Hill – producer
- Mark Friedman – engineer
- Charlie Allen – lead singer
- Glenn Schwartz – lead guitar
- Tom Marshall – rhythm guitar
- Brent Block – bass
- John Hill – keyboards
- Frank Cook – drums
- Wilton Felder – tenor saxophone
- Wayne Henderson – trombone
- A.D. Brisbois – trumpet
- Freddy Hill – trumpet

== Charts ==
Chart (1969/71)	Peak position
Australia (Kent Music Report)	38
US Billboard Top LPs	91
