= Get It On (album) =

Studio album by Pacific Gas & Electric
- Released: 1968
- Label: Power
- Producers: Frank Cook, Freddy DeMann

Pacific Gas & Electric chronology
Get It On (1968)	Pacific Gas and Electric (1969)

Get It On was the debut studio album by American blues rock band, Pacific Gas & Electric. It charted the following year.

== Background ==
Get It On was produced by Fred DeMann and recorded during his fourteen months with Kent, Modern and Bright Orange Records (Formerly Power Records), where he was Vice-President and General Manager. By May 1969, he had announced his resignation. He was also credited with discovering Pacific Gas & Electric.

The album was released in the UK on B & C Records CAS 1003 in 1969.

One song from the album, "Cry, Cry, Cry" was performed at the Fillmore East venue in March 1969. Reviewer Fred Kirby who attended the concert wrote that it was an exceptional number.

== Reception ==
The album was a Pick Hit in the 9 November 1968 issue of Record World. The review was positive with the reviewer writing that the beat and the wail didn't quit throughout the two sides. The songs, "Cry, Cry, Cry," "Jelly Jelly" and "Live Love" were selected for mention.

== Charts ==
The album debuted at No. 93 on the Cash Box Top 100 albums chart for the week of 7 December 1968. It peaked at No. 85 for the week of 11 January 1969. For the week of 25 January, it was at No. 116.

The album debuted at No. 96 in the Record World 100 Top LP'S chart for the week of 14 December 1969.

The album debuted at No. 181 on the Billboard Top LPs chart for the week of 1 February 1969.

== Track listing ==
=== A ===
1. "Wade in the Water" - 6:11
2. "Cry, Cry, Cry" - 5:25
3. "Motor City's Burning" - 6:45

=== B ===
1. "The Hunter" - 3:21
2. "Long Handled Shovel" - 3:31
3. "Jelly Jelly" - 6:39
4. "Stormy Times" - 2:43
5. "Live Love" - 3:21

== Personnel ==
Adapted from Discogs.

Charlie Allen - vocals

Glenn Schwartz - lead guitar

Tom Marshall - rhythm guitar

Brent Block - bass

Frank Cook - drums

== Later years ==
The album was re-released in 2008/2009 on compact disc with extra tracks, titled, Get It On / The Kent Records Sessions.

The album received a good review by Progrography with the reviewer writing that they never thought a candle could be held to the Graham Bond Organisation's version of "Wade in the Water but Pacific Gas & Electric come really close. The other songs that had merit were, "Cry, Cry, Cry", "The Hunter", "Motor City’s Burning" and "Jelly Jelly".
