= Rock Machine (disambiguation) =

Rock Machine is an International Outlaw Motorcycle Club from Quebec, Canada.

Rock Machine may also refer to:

- Rock Machine, the former name of Indus Creed, an Indian rock band
- Rock Machine Records, the French electronic music label
- Rok Mašina (English: Rock Machine), a former Yugoslav hard rock band

== See also ==
- The Rock Machine Turns You On (sampler)
- Rock Machine I Love You
