= USOA =

USOA or USoA may refer to:

- United States of America, a country in North America
- Underwater Society of America, the peak body for underwater sport and recreational diving in the United States
- The United States of America (band), a late-1960s American experimental rock and psychedelic band
  - The United States of America (album), the band's eponymous 1968 album
- United States Overseas Airlines, a United States supplemental air carrier, a hybrid charter/scheduled airline (1946–1964)
