= Hard Coming Love =

Single by The United States of America

from the album The United States of America
- Released: 2004 (single)
- Recorded: 1967
- Genre: Psychedelic rock; experimental rock
- Length: 4:41
- Label: Sundazed Music
- Songwriters: Joe Byrd, Dorothy Moskowitz

"Hard Coming Love" is the second song on the 1968 album The United States of America, by the American psychedelic rock band The United States of America. It was written by Joe Byrd and Dorothy Moskowitz and is sung by Moskowitz.

== 2004 single ==
The song was released as a 7" single by Sundazed Music in 2004 as a part of their "Kustom Shop" of original releases. Its B-side was the "Osamu’s Birthday". The originally-unissued "Osamu's Birthday" has a strange vocal track which Moskowitz recorded by singing the lyrics phonetically backwards, then the track was reversed for an other-worldly effect.

Both these songs are previously unissued versions recorded live-in-the-studio, 1967. They are different from the versions that appear on the 2004 bonus track version of the band's only album.

=== Track listing ===
==== Side A ====
1. "Hard Coming Love" (Joe Byrd, Dorothy Moskowitz) - 4:53

==== Side B ====
1. "Osamu's Birthday" (Byrd) - 2:45
