= The American Metaphysical Circus =

Studio album by Joe Byrd and The Field Hippies
- Released: 1969
- Recorded: 1968
- Genre: Psychedelic rock
- Length: 39:22
- Label: Columbia Masterworks MS 7317
- Producer: Joseph Byrd

Professional ratings
Review scores
Source	Rating
Allmusic	3/5 stars

The American Metaphysical Circus is a 1969 album by Joseph "Joe" Byrd. It was recorded after his departure from the band The United States of America, and featured some of the earliest recorded work in rock music extensively utilizing synthesizers and vocoder, along with an extended group of West Coast studio musicians Byrd named "The Field Hippies".

== Musical overview ==
The album is most noted for "The Sub-Sylvian Litanies", which opened Side A. This three-part suite has been described as "an entire acid trip in 11 minutes". Other album highlights include the equally psychedelic "The Elephant at the Door", and the politically charged "Invisible Man", written for and aimed squarely at President Lyndon B. Johnson. Two of the more unusual tracks on the record are "Mister Fourth of July" – a ragtime tune complete with scratchy 78 rpm-style effects, and "Leisure World", featuring narration from long-time ABC voice-over and "Ghoulardi" originator Ernie Anderson in an ode to California's first retirement mega-community.

Among the musicians featured on the record are prominent West Coast studio musicians Tom Scott and the late Ted Greene, who is credited with the album's stellar guitar work in one of his few recorded appearances. Meyer Hirsch was a member of the Buddy Rich Big Band and is an experimental composer. Vocalist Victoria Bond has gone on to a prominent career as a classical composer, conductor and vocalist. Fred Selden, a student of Byrd's at UCLA, joined the Don Ellis Orchestra (led by Byrd's partner in the UCLA New Music Workshop), received a Grammy nomination, and later returned to UCLA to receive his Ph.D.

The extensive use of effects, delays, echoes, backwards vocals and other recording tricks and techniques are reminiscent of some of the experiments and work carried out by George Martin as well as Pink Floyd. Byrd referenced Martin in a 2004 interview.

== Legacy ==
The album's cult status was confirmed by its presence in the Columbia Masterworks catalog for an estimated twenty years. Byrd reported in 2002 in an interview published on Salon.com, and follow-up in regards to a letter filed in the Napster music copyright case, that despite estimated sales of at least 100,000 units for The American Metaphysical Circus alone, he had never received a penny of royalties for either The United States of America or The American Metaphysical Circus from Sony/Columbia/CBS.

Because The American Metaphysical Circus offered a markedly different sound in its intense horn and woodwind arrangements and even more novel content than on the earlier The United States of America release, many fans of the earlier record are not as enchanted with the latter, and vice versa. In the UK, The United States of America was more well-known and highly regarded, in part because of the inclusion of one track on a popular Columbia sampler album, The Rock Machine Turns You On, which was not released in the United States. In the U.S. The American Metaphysical Circus remained in print for nearly twenty years in the Columbia catalog, whilst The United States of America was relegated to cut-out bins shortly after its 1968 release.

It has become a popular and oft-repeated misconception, with the more recent revival of interest in The United States of America, that The American Metaphysical Circus was not as popular or a commercial success, whereas information discussed by Byrd surrounding the Napster case and the experience of American record enthusiasts confirms exactly the opposite.

Prior to its re-release, mint vinyl copies of The American Metaphysical Circus were sold by collectors for prices sometimes in excess of $100US, and both the original 1969 issue and 1996 CD still command premium prices on collector websites. Atlantis Records described the 1999 re-release as "sought after 60's American Psych/Electronic rock classic from United States of America mainman Joseph Byrd". Gatefold Records offered "Welcome re-issue of the 1969 followup to the United States of America album (Joe Byrd was the leader of that group). Trippy Moog and electronics noodling mixed with stunning bursts of fuzzed out guitars and acid-damaged lyrics". The CD was reissued by the UK label Acadia in 2007.

== Track listing ==
The Sub-Sylvian Litanies

1. "Kalyani" – 3:52
2. "You Can't Ever Come Down" – 3:02
3. "Moonsong: Pelog" – 3:47

American Bedmusic - Four Dreams For A Departing President

1. "Patriot's Lullabye" – 2:49
2. "Nightmare Train" – 3:20
3. "Invisible Man" – 3:33
4. "Mister 4th of July" – 1:48

Gospel Music For Abraham Ruddell Byrd III

1. "Gospel Music" – 4:29

The Southwestern Geriatrics Arts and Crafts Festival

1. "The Sing-Along Song" – 4:05
2. "The Elephant at the Door" – 5:13
3. "Leisure World" – 2:36
4. "The Sing-Along Song (Reprise)" – 0:48

== Credits ==
- Pot (Phillip Namanworth)– Piano, Conductor, Harpsichord
- Ed Sheftel – Trumpet, Flugelhorn
- Christie Thompson – Vocals (Lead on "Mister 4th of July")
- Ernest "Ernie" Anderson – Voices
- Fred Selden – Clarinet, Saxophones, Flute
- Ted Greene – Guitar
- Joseph Hunter Byrd – Organ, Producer, Vocals, Keyboards, Conductor, Synthesizer (Lead vocals on "Nightmare Train", "Invisible Man", "The Sing-Along Song")
- Larry Kass – Tabla
- Michael Whitney – Guitar (Classical)
- Chuck Bennett – Bass Trombone
- Victoria Bond – Vocals (Lead on "Kalyani", "Patriot's Lullabye", "Leisure World")
- Bob Breault – Engineer
- Ray Cappocchi – Tuba, Tenor Trombone
- Dana Chalberg – Flute, Piccolo
- John Clauder – Percussion, Drums
- Susan de Lange – Vocals, Electronic Voices (Lead on "You Can't Ever Come Down", "Moonsong: Pelog", "The Elephant at the Door")
- Meyer Hirsch – Flute, Saxophones
- Don Kerian – Trumpet, Cornet
- Gregg Kovner – Drums, Percussion
- Tom Scott – Clarinet, Saxophones, Flute
- Harvey Newmark – Bass (uncredited on album)
- Harihar Rao – Percussion (uncredited on album)
- Paul Welborne – audio reproduction consultant
- Roger Phillip – assistant to Joseph Byrd
