= Fill Your Head with Rock =

Compilation album by Various Artists
- Released: 1970
- Genre: Rock
- Label: CBS Records SPR 39/40
- Producer: Various

Series chronology
Rock Machine I Love You (1968)	Fill Your Head with Rock (1970)	Rockbuster (1970)

Fill Your Head with Rock (1970) was the third release in the successful CBS Records Rock Machine UK budget sampler album series. It broke new ground, by extending the format to a double album, and also featured more UK artists than previous samplers.

Compiler David Howell (later Managing Director of Pete Waterman's PWL label) stated that while the earlier samplers were merely aimed at promoting specific full-price releases, this record was part of a major push to establish the label as "the top label in contemporary music" in the UK, and also to establish the market for double albums.

== Track listing ==
Side one

1. "Listen" (R. Lamm) : Chicago (from the LP Chicago 66221) (3:22)
2. "Savour" (Santana) : Santana (from the LP Santana 63815) (2:46)
3. "Give a Life, Take a Life" (California/Adler) : Spirit (from the LP Clear 63729) (3:47)
4. "Passing Through" (K. White) : Steamhammer (from the LP Mk II 63694) (5:17)
5. "Smiling Phases" (S. Winwood-J. Capaldi-C. Wood) : Blood, Sweat and Tears (from the LP Blood, Sweat & Tears 63504) (5:10)

Side two

1. "Tired of Waiting" (Flock) : Flock (from the LP Flock 63733) (4:35)
2. "Come to the Sabbat" (Clive Jones-Jim Gannon) : Black Widow (from the LP Sacrifice 63948) (4:55)
3. "Dance in the Smoke" (R. Argent-C. White) : Argent (from the LP Argent 63781) (6:10)
4. "Gunga Din" (G. Parsons) : The Byrds (from the LP Ballad of Easy Rider 63795) (3:02)
5. "Living in Sin" (James) : Skin Alley (from the LP Skin Alley 63847) (4:35)

Side three

1. "Gibsom Street" (L. Nyro) : Laura Nyro (from the LP New York Tendaberry 63410) (4:30)
2. "You Know Who I Am" (L. Cohen) : Leonard Cohen (from the LP Songs from a Room 63587) (3:22)
3. "Stamping Ground" (L. Hardin) : Moondog (from the LP Moondog 63906) (2:36)
4. "The Inbetween Man" (A. Kane) : Amory Kane (from the LP Just to Be There 63849) (5:22)
5. "The Garden of Jane Delawney" (T. Boswell) : Trees (from the LP The Garden of Jane Delawney 63837) (4:05)
6. "A Small Fruit Song" (Al Stewart) : Al Stewart (from the LP Zero She Flies 63848) (2:00)
7. "Driving Wheel" (T. Rush) : Tom Rush (from the LP Tom Rush 63940) (5:22)

Side four

1. "Try (Just a Little Bit Harder)" (J. Ragavoy-C. Taylor) : Janis Joplin (from the LP I Got Dem Ol' Kozmic Blues Again Mama!) (4:13)
2. "One Room Country Shack" (Mercy Dee Walton) : Al Kooper (from the LP Kooper Session 63797) (3:35)
3. "Six Days on the Road" (C. Montgomery-E.Greene) : Taj Mahal (from the LP Giant Step/De Ole Folks at Home 66226) (2:55)
4. "Don't Think About It Baby" (M. Bloomfield) : Mike Bloomfield (from the LP It's Not Killing Me 63652) (3:34)
5. "Bluesbuster" (C. Allen) : Pacific Gas & Electric (from the LP Pacific Gas and Electric 63822) (2:56)
6. "I Love Everybody" (J. Winter) : Johnny Winter (from the LP Second Winter) (3:50)

== Album cover ==
The inside spread of the "Fill Your Head with Rock" cover.

For once a sampler album cover showed the featured artists, and even provided a key for identification. Laura Nyro can be seen at the top left, Taj Mahal next to her, and Al Kooper & Leonard Cohen at the top right. Four of the artists are not shown: Moondog, Amory Kane, Black Widow and Skin Alley. The front cover features Jerry Goodman of The Flock.

== Booklet ==
The included eight-page booklet featured brief descriptions of the artists, their images, and photographs of the relevant albums. It also included publicity for other CBS Records artists as well as those on related labels such as Dandelion - Principal Edwards Magic Theatre, Beau, Bridget St John, Mike Hart & Siren; Direction - The Chambers Brothers & Taj Mahal; and Straight - Captain Beefheart, Alice Cooper, Judy Henske and Jerry Yester, Tim Buckley, & The GTOs.

== International releases ==
In Australia, it was pressed and released with unaltered artwork and tracklisting.

In France, the album, retitled Superb Super Pop Session N°2 with different artwork, reached No. 10 in the album chart.

In Spain and Latin America, the title was translated as Llena Tu Cabeza de Rock. It was listed No. 5 in the Hits of the World chart.

Finnish label Finnlevy promoted the record heavily, leading to a "virtual sellout" of a Johnny Winter performance at the Kulttuuritalo.

In South Africa, The Gramophone Co. gave the record "massive" promotion, including booking an unprecedented weeklong exposure on the top teenage programme "The Radio Record Club" on Springbok Radio.
