= Ted Greene =

American jazz guitarist, columnist, and educator (1946–2005)

Background information
- Born: September 26, 1946; Los Angeles, California, U.S.
- Died: July 25, 2005 (aged 58) Los Angeles, California, U.S.
- Genres: Rock, blues rock, jazz rock
- Occupations: Musician, educator
- Instrument: Guitar
- Formerly of: Bluesberry Jam, Fito de la Parra, The Nomads, The Purple Gang
- Website: tedgreene.com

Theodore Greene (September 26, 1946 – July 23, 2005) was an American fingerstyle guitarist, columnist, session musician and educator based in Encino, California.

== Career ==
Greene began his own guitar studies at the age of 11, and was an accomplished player while still in high school, occasionally collaborating with local rock and R&B bands. He briefly studied accounting at California State University, Northridge, but dropped out to devote more time to music.

In the 1960s he was a member of the rock band Natural Selection and a blues rock group called Bluesberry Jam, which included future Canned Heat drummer Fito de la Parra. He was a friend and collaborator with Joseph Byrd, on whose Columbia Masterworks album The American Metaphysical Circus he was featured (he also provided the whimsical name of the studio band who performed it, "The Field Hippies"). During the late 1960s and early 1970s he did commercial studio work with Byrd. He was again called on in 1977 to provide guitar tablature for three arrangements of Bix Beiderbecke's piano music for the Ry Cooder album Jazz, which Byrd arranged and produced.

=== Teaching and Educational Approach ===
Although Greene is often regarded as a jazz musician, he played many musical styles. He was widely known for his personalized teaching approach, offering thousands of one-on-one lessons throughout his career. He created highly detailed handwritten notes for each student, covering topics such as chord melody, voice leading, and adapting keyboard harmony for guitar. Greene encouraged students to focus more on harmonic and inner voice leadings rather than solely relying on scale patterns. His accumulation of notes, transcriptions, and analyses were later digitized and made available online as the Ted Greene Archives. He also provided seminars at the Guitar Institute of Technology, columns for Guitar Player magazine, and his instructional books on harmony, chord melody, and single-note soloing. A voracious reader of almost any book on music theory, especially from the common practice period (circa 1600–1900) he distilled complex concepts regarding the structure of western music and would write out more accessible versions for students to understand (handed out to students in the form of lesson "sheets"), often applying keyboard concepts to the guitar. For example, many transcriptions of the chorales of J. S. Bach would be re-written for guitar with useful analysis applicable to any musical setting.

He would also make occasional live appearances at clubs in the San Fernando Valley, usually playing a Fender Telecaster.

Greene typically worked as a vocal accompanist, which he preferred because he found group settings restrictive. While he was a sought-after session musician, he derived much of his income from tutoring. He wrote several influential books on the subject of jazz guitar performance and theory: Chord Chemistry, Modern Chord Progressions: Jazz and Classical Voicings for Guitar, and the two-volume Jazz Guitar: Single Note Soloing. Published in 1971, Chord Chemistry became widely regarded as a foundational jazz guitar harmony known for its complex catalog of chord voicings.

His playing style included techniques such as harp-like arpeggios combined with gentle, tasteful neck vibrato, creating a "shimmer" to his sound. Other notable techniques included playing songs with a walking bass line with simultaneous melodies. Greene used counterpoint to improvise in a variety of styles, playing, for instance, a jazz standard such as Autumn Leaves in Baroque style. He used a large variety of chord voicings, often creating the effect of two simultaneous players.

Greene recorded one album, Solo Guitar, which was produced by William Perry and Leon White, and released in 1977 on PMP Records. The album contains no overdubbing (recording on multiple tracks).

Although not widely known to the general public, Greene was highly respected among professional guitarists. Guitarist Steve Vai has praised Greene's musical knowledge and perceptiveness on Solo Guitar, stating that Greene "is totally in touch with the potential of harmonic constructions" which allows him to create an "organic and inspired listening delight." In a 1982 discussion with Robert Fripp, John McLaughlin described Greene as "really unbelievable", noting that "it's so difficult to move around on a guitar in the harmonic way one can do on a keyboard...He's the only guitar player who accomplishes this thing that really turns me on."

Ted Greene: Sound, Time, and Unlimited Possibility, by guitarist Terrence McManus, published in 2015, is the most complete analysis of Greene's work that exists.

Greene helped Fender design a 1952 Telecaster vintage reissue (their first such reissue) by making reference to his collection of old Telecasters, Esquires, Broadcasters and Nocasters.

Greene died in his Encino apartment of a heart attack on July 23, 2005, at age 58. In 2009 Barbara Franklin wrote the biography My Life with The Chord Chemist: A Memoir of Ted Greene, Apotheosis of Solo Guitar. She died on August 13, 2011.

== Discography ==
- The American Metaphysical Circus by Joe Byrd and the Field Hippies (1969)
- Solo Guitar (Art of Life, 1977)
- Among Friends by John Pisano (1995)
- Conversation Pieces by John Pisano (1997)
- Mojo Blues by Will Ray (2002)
- John Pisano's Guitar Night by John Pisano (2007)

== Publications ==
- Chord Chemistry, Alfred Publishing Company
- Modern Chord Progressions, Alfred Publishing Company
- Jazz Guitar Single Note Soloing, Volume 1, Alfred Publishing Company
- Jazz Guitar Single Note Soloing, Volume 2, Alfred Publishing Company
- My Life with the Chord Chemist: A Memoir of Ted Greene, Apotheosis of Solo Guitar by Barbara Franklin
- Ted Greene: Sound, Time, and Unlimited Possibility by Terrence McManus
