= Bluesberry Jam =

American blues band

- Origin: Los Angeles, California, US
- Genres: Blues-rock blues
- Years active: 1960s
- Past members: Charlie Allen; Ted Greene; Adolfo "Fito" de la Parra; Frank Cook; Al Walton

Bluesberry Jam was an American blues rock band active in the 1960s. Among the members of the band were future Canned Heat drummer Adolfo "Fito" de la Parra and guitarist Ted Greene and Charlie Allen, future front man of Pacific Gas & Electric. Another notable member was Frank Cook who was with Canned Heat and would end up in Pacific Gas & Electric.

== Band info ==
The original band was: Albert Walton (Vocal) Joe Matza (Guitar) Ted Greene (Guitar) Richard Fowle (Keyboard) Dave Day (Bass) David Hill (Drums)

It was as this Group that played the Magic Mushroom in Los Angeles with Canned Heat, and the Hullabaloo Club in Hollywood on October 3, 1967 David Hill (original drummer) was drafted into the US Army, having received his draft notes later the same day as that of the Magic Mushroom performance.

Bluesberry Jam came out of Los Angeles and were among the three most popular blues bands of that era, the other two being Pacific Gas & Electric and Canned Heat. Canned Heat shared their first musical bill with Bluesberry Jam at the Magic Mushroom in Los Angeles.

Mexican born drummer Fito de la Parra was in a band called the Sotweed Factor. When Softweed Factor broke up, he joined Bluesberry Jam. He would stay with the band until leaving to Join Canned Heat. The turning point was one night when Bluesberry Jam were playing at the Magic Mushroom sharing the same bill with Canned Heat, there were others watching de la Parra for a certain reason. This was actually arranged by Skip Taylor the manager so that Canned Heat's members could watch Bluesberry Jam drummer Adolfo "Fito" de la Parra at work. The result of this was de la Parra joining Canned Heat. As Canned Heat were looking to get rid of their drummer Frank Cook, the whole thing became a simple switch-over with Cook then becoming the drummer for Bluesberry Jam. Frank Cook actually had a Jazz background. He had previously played with trumpeter Chet Baker, pianist Elmo Hope and bassist Charlie Haden. He had also been involved with Shirley Ellis and Dobie Gray.

Cook would stay with them until he joined Pacific Gas & Electric. By that time his former bandmate Charlie Allen was with PGE as well. Al Walton who was a member of an early version of Pacific Gas & Electric left to Join Bluesberry Jam.

== Venues ==
Besides The Magic Mushroom, the band could be seen playing at The Shrine Auditorium on Jefferson Blvd. On November 25, 1967, they shared billing at The Shrine Auditorium with The Doors, Iron Butterfly and Sweetwater. David Hill, their original drummer did not play the Shrine on November 25, 1967, but was in that audience, home on leave from the U.S. Army. in mid 1969 playing at venues such as Thee Experience in Sunset Blvd, a venue where Alice Cooper, Sons of Champlin, Poco and Blues Image would also appear. Between the 9th and 11 June that year they shared billing with Joe Cocker.

== Confusion ==
There are a number of misleading bios and reviews that possibly mistakenly credit Bluesberry Jam members with being in certain bands and certain other members of bands being members of Bluesberry jam. They also mistaken in Bluesberry Jam's position regarding the evolution of Pacific Gas & Electric. While it is true that a number of Pacific Gas & Electric's members did come from Bluesberry Jam and at least one member of Pacific Gas & Electric left that band to Join Bluesberry Jam, Pacific Gas & Electric didn't evolve out of Bluesberry Jam as such. The Pacific Gas & Electric website states that neither Tom Marshall or Brent Block were members of Bluesberry Jam and Fito de la Parra was never a member of Pacific Gas & Electric. There are sites that credit future Pacific Gas & Electric front man Charlie Allen as being the drummer for Bluesberry Jam. The fact that certain members of the bands had switched places has added to the confusion.

Pacific Gas & Electric was formed in 1967 and their first album released in 1968. The Canned Heat website places Bluesberry Jam at the Magic Mushroom venue prior to December 1, 1967 and the Rock Archeology website places Bluesberry Jam at the Thee Experience venue on two dates in June 1969. This would indicate that rather that one band evolving out of another, Pacific Gas & Electric inherited some of Bluesberry Jam's members. Both were active separate working bands at the same time.

== Later years ==
- After leaving Bluesberry Jam and becoming the drummer of Pacific Gas & Electric, Frank Cook would end up becoming the band's manager as a result of being injured by a drunk driver in a car accident. It is believed that in later years Frank Cook would become a psychiatrist in California.
- Charlie Allen would stay with Pacific Gas & Electric until 1973 where he would use the band's name to launch a solo career. He died in 1990.
- Ted Greene would become a well-respected guitarist and teacher. He died in 2005.
- Fito de la Parra joined Canned Heat and still remains a member as of 2023.

== Past members ==
- Adolfo "Fito" de la Parra (Drums)
- Al Walton (Vocal)
- Ted Greene (Guitar)
- Charlie Allen (Drums)
- Frank Cook (Drums)

Original Members c. 1967 Albert Walton (Vocal) Joe Matza (Guitar) Ted Greene (Guitar) Richard Fowle (Keyboard) Dave Day (Bass) David Hill (Drums)
