= Cracks (1975 film) =

1975 animated short film associated with Sesame Street

- A screenshot of the film, featuring the crack master.
- Narrated by: Dorothy Moskowitz
- Production company: P Imagination
- Release date: December 31, 1975
- Running time: 1.66 minutes
- Country: United States
- Language: English

Cracks is a 1975 animated short from the children's television program Sesame Street. The short, which is about 100 seconds long, features a young girl who meets animals made from the cracks in her bedroom wall. It gained notoriety online after several internet users initiated a search to find the short, which they remembered as scaring them when they were children.

== Production ==
The short was created by a San Francisco company called P Imagination according to Children's Television Workshop archives. This may refer to Imagination, Inc., a company which animated multiple shorts for Sesame Street; however, the names of the artists and directors who worked on the short are unknown. Mel Martin provided the saxophone music, and Dorothy Moskowitz narrated the short.

== Initial release ==
The short aired a dozen times between its premiere on December 31, 1975, and May 2, 1980. Although official sources had no explanation for the short's disappearance after this date, some publications have suggested that it may have been due to the rise of reporting on crack cocaine. This, combined with the short's setting in a run-down house, a Black main character, and an antagonist named the "crack master" may have resulted in too many negative connotations to continue airing the short. However, Mental Floss, in their article on the subject, pointed out that this may be unlikely as reporting on the crack epidemic was not widespread until the mid-1980s; rather, they attribute the pulling of the short to its confusing message and potentially frightening imagery.

The short also aired outside of the United States. A Spanish-language version aired on Plaza Sesamo in the mid-1990s. Dubs in French, Hebrew, Portuguese, and Turkish have also been recovered.

== Plot ==
A little girl is laying in bed, looking at the cracks in her wall while it rains outside. The cracks come to life as a camel, a monkey, and a hen, who take the girl on an adventure. They encounter the "crack master", but after making a frightening face he falls apart entirely, exposing wooden beams behind the plaster walls. The girl returns to her room and tells the animals "The rain has stopped outside. We’ll go and see the cracks again some day".

== Search ==
In the early 2000s, Jon Armond, a voice actor who remembered seeing the short as a child, began posting on message boards to try and find information about it. Although other users also remembered it and how it had scared them, there was no immediate identification of the short or recovery of the actual footage. Online searchers reached out to Children's Television Workshop, the company which produces Sesame Street, but were not provided with any information about the short. CTW had looked for the short in their archives, but were unable to find it due to not knowing its name.

In 2008, Armond, who posted online under his full name, received a fax at his place of work from an unknown number, which promised to send him Cracks if he promised not to share it with the public. Six months after agreeing, Armond received a copy of the short in a blank envelope in his mailbox with a note reading "We trust this completes your search". Armond shared this encounter online, but did not share the actual short. He did post a recreation online, where he acted out the short while using its audio. In 2009, he invited fellow searcher Jennifer Bourne to a Los Angeles coffee shop to show her the short. Bourne subsequently posted about the meeting, confirming to other online searchers that Armond had been telling the truth about having the copy. That same year, Armond released an audio documentary about the search for the short.

In December 2013, founder of the Lost Media Wiki, Daniel Wilson, received an anonymous email that contained only an attachment with the short. Since the email contained no restrictions on how it could be distributed, Wilson promptly posted it to YouTube. Although searchers initially thought Armond anonymously sent his copy to Wilson, the two copies are formatted differently, with Armond's being from an episode, while Wilson's had a production title card.

Over the next few years, several Latin American online users claimed they had seen a Spanish-language dub of the short on Plaza Sesamo. This dub was recovered and uploaded to YouTube in 2017.
