= The United States of America (band) =

American avant-garde band

- Back (l-r): Byrd, Moskowitz, Marron. Front (l-r): Bogas, Woodson, Forbes

Background information
- Origin: Los Angeles, California, U.S.
- Genres: Psychedelic rock; Experimental rock; Electronic Music; Avant-garde
- Years active: 1967–1968
- Label: Columbia
- Past members: Joseph Byrd; Dorothy Moskowitz; Michael Agnello; Stuart Brotman; Craig Woodson; Gordon Marron; Rand Forbes; Ed Bogas; Jeff Marinell; Richard Grayson; Carmie Simon; Dennis Wood

The United States of America was an American psychedelic rock band founded in Los Angeles in 1967 by composer Joseph Byrd and vocalist Dorothy Moskowitz, with electric violinist Gordon Marron, bassist Rand Forbes and drummer Craig Woodson. Their 1968 self-titled album, often cited as an early showcase for the use of electronic devices in rock music, was met with critical acclaim and minor chart success. They disbanded shortly after its release.

The group's sound is psychedelia and the avant-garde. Unusually, the band had no guitar player; instead, they used strings, keyboards and electronics, including primitive synthesizers, and various audio processors, including the ring modulator. Many of the songs' lyrics reflected Byrd's leftist political views. AllMusic described them as "among the most revolutionary bands of the late '60s."

== History ==
=== Background and formation ===
Composer Joseph Byrd and lyricist and singer Dorothy Moskowitz first met in New York City in early 1963 when Byrd was working on a recording of Civil War period music for Time-Life. A devotee of composer Charles Ives, Byrd had already become a respected and innovative composer, involved in experimental music as part of the Fluxus movement with John Cage, Morton Feldman, La Monte Young, David Tudor, Yoko Ono and others. Moskowitz was studying music at Barnard College, where she was taught by Otto Luening; she also sang in a vocal group with Art Garfunkel, and worked with David Rubinson on a musical theatre production, as well as on the Time-Life project. Byrd and Moskowitz began a relationship – he has referred to their "profound musical and personal relationship", and she has described him as being her "aesthetic guru" – and he helped her obtain a post with Capitol Records; when she left, she was replaced in turn by Rubinson.

Later in 1963, Byrd and Moskowitz moved together to Los Angeles, where Byrd started a doctorate in ethnomusicology at UCLA. According to Moskowitz: "Joe brought with him a New York avant-garde cachet ... a background in electronic music ... and composing skills ... He attracted immediate attention. Exciting musicians, dancers and visual artists sought collaboration with him. The talent pool for what eventually became the USA was sourced from this group." Byrd co-founded the New Music Workshop in Los Angeles with jazz trumpeter Don Ellis, and, after Ellis left, began to incorporate elements of performance art into his events. Moskowitz helped stage Byrd's performances, and performed in some of them. Both Byrd and Moskowitz also contributed to an album of Indian raga music by Gayathri Rajapur and Harihar Rao, recorded in 1965 and released by Folkways Records in 1968. On one occasion in 1965, as the concluding part of a series of concerts and events called "Steamed Spring Vegetable Pie" (a title taken at random from The Alice B. Toklas Cookbook), Byrd organized a blues band fronted by his friend Linda Ronstadt, to play during a "happening". Byrd said that "the realization that rock was an access to a larger public came out of that concert, and the idea of forming a band began taking shape."

Byrd became increasingly attracted to radical politics, and became a member of the Communist Party, explaining that it was "the one group that had discipline, an agenda, and was willing to work within the existing institutions to educate and radicalize American society." He left UCLA, but continued to stage performance art events, albeit on a reduced budget. After their personal relationship broke down in 1966, Moskowitz returned to New York, but she and Byrd stayed in contact. In early 1967 Byrd started to form a rock band with another politically radical composer, Michael Agnello, together with Moskowitz, bassist Stuart Brotman (previously of Canned Heat and later of Kaleidoscope), and African drumming expert Craig Woodson who had also been involved in the New Music Workshop. Audition recordings by this version of the band, from September 1967, are included on some later CD reissues. However, Agnello left the project on a point of principle when a commercial recording contract with Columbia Records was being considered, and Brotman also left.

The first public line-up of the band included Byrd, Moskowitz, Woodson, and two contemporary classical musicians with whom Byrd had worked on earlier experimental projects in the New Music Workshop: Gordon Marron (violin) and Rand Forbes (bass). Later, for some of their recordings and performances, they added Marron's friend and writing partner Ed Bogas (keyboards). Byrd initially commissioned electrical engineer Tom Oberheim to build him a ring modulator, later replaced by electronic oscillators in a monophonic synthesizer built by aerospace engineer Richard Durrett. Among other effects, Marron used an octave divider on his electric violin, and Woodson attached contact microphones to his drum set and hung slinkies from his cymbals for a musique concrète effect.

As the group's founder and leader, Byrd stated that his aesthetic aims for the band and album were to form "an avant-garde political/musical rock group with the idea of combining electronic sound (not electronic music) ... musical/political radicalism ... [and] performance art." According to Moskowitz, the choice of the band name "The United States of America" was intentionally provocative: "Using the full name of the country for something so common as a rock group was a way of expressing disdain for governmental policy. It was like hanging the flag upside down." As well as crediting the influence of Dada-inspired band The Red Crayola, Byrd said:

We were very conscious that we were plunging into rock without any real knowledge of, or experience in, the medium. We had played Cage and Stockhausen, African and Indian music, and I thought we could simply bring all that to rock. But we knew almost nothing about the roots of rock and roll. We all improvised, of course, but in a "contemporary music" style. In retrospect, creating a rock band with no rock musicians was a bad decision on my part. Still, since I considered myself the most eclectic composer on the planet, I was confident that whatever the others couldn't do I could write.

The demo recorded by the band secured the interest of Clive Davis at Columbia. Through their friend David Rubinson—who had started working for Columbia as a record producer, for bands and musicians including Moby Grape and Taj Mahal—they gained a recording contract.

=== Performances and recording ===
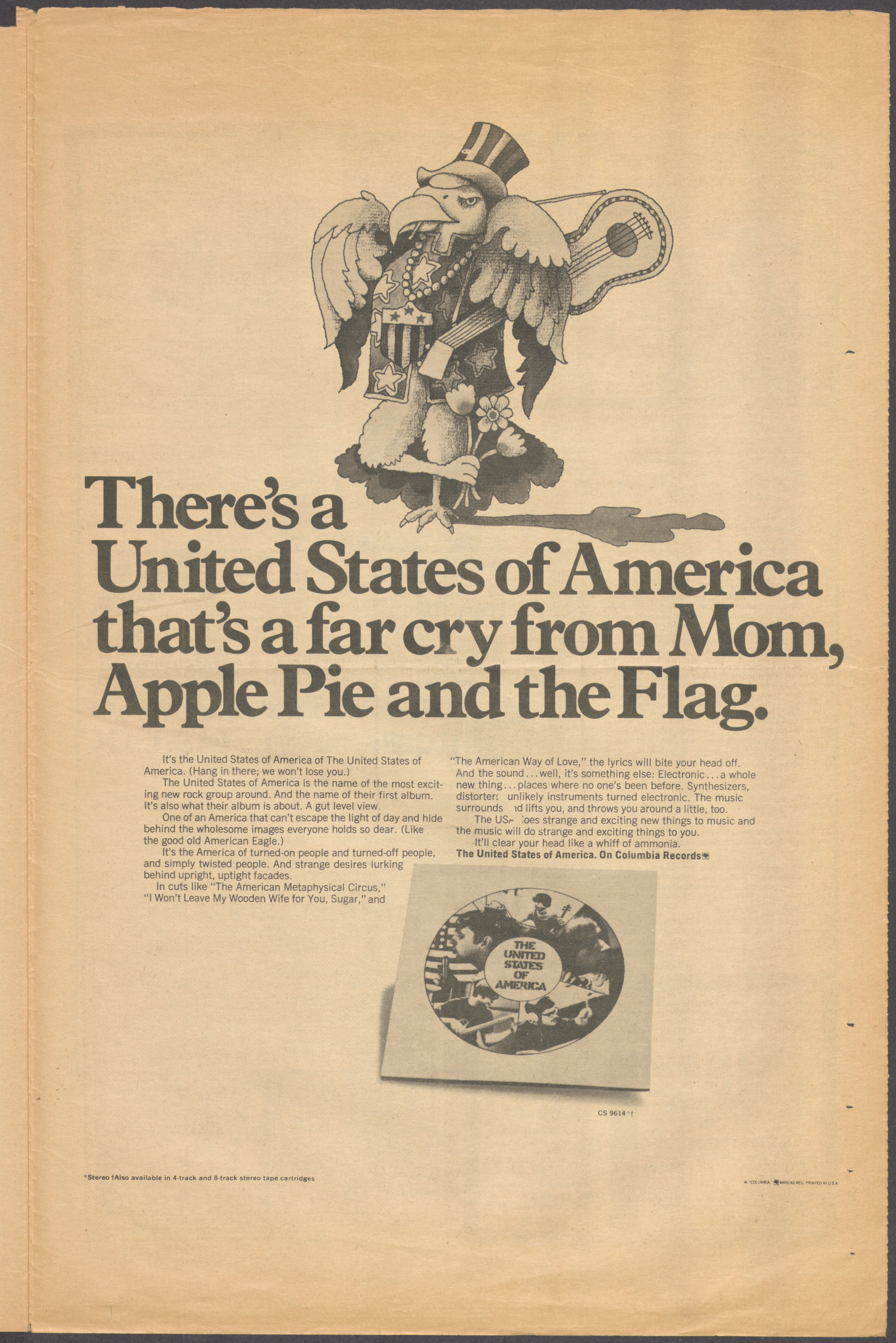
Ad for the band and its record, 1968.

The band undertook their first live performances in late 1967, at the Ash Grove in Los Angeles, when Agnello was still performing with the band. Byrd explained:

the two engagements at The Ash Grove helped define us as a combination of experimental rock and performance art. Everything we did on the album we had performed live, via the addition of two tape decks on stage. We traveled with a bunch of gear, including a calliope, a 3' x 4' neon American flag (which had alternately flashing red and white stripes), and a full-size plaster nun. We may have been the first to use fog machines: the low-lying fog and the flashing flag created a striking environment. We tended to use low stage lighting when we could, with only a pin spot for the vocalist. And since we often played from written scores, we used stand lights, which also added a kind of other-worldly lit-from-below effect.

Electronic devices were used live as well as on the album, to process other instruments and Moskowitz's voice as well as providing their own musical textures. The band's performances got mixed receptions. They undertook a short tour of the East Coast, with Richie Havens and The Troggs, with their performances in Boston and Greenwich Village being especially well received. Byrd later said of their shows: "Audiences generally were positive, sort of ... it was a new kind of experience, and it wasn't just the music, it was performance art."

They recorded their first and only album in December 1967, produced by Rubinson, with Byrd credited as providing electronic music, electric harpsichord, organ, calliope, piano, and Durrett Electronic Music Synthesizer. Besides Byrd, Moskowitz (lead vocals), Marron (electric violin, ring modulator), Forbes (fretless electric bass), and Woodson (drums and percussion), several of the tracks also credited Bogas. Moskowitz and Byrd collaborated in writing most of the songs, with Byrd responsible for both words and music on three tracks, "The American Metaphysical Circus", "Love Song for the Dead Ché", and "The American Way of Love". Byrd described "The American Metaphysical Circus" and "The American Way of Love" as "comments on the media as a means of thought-control, and the bourgeois sentimentality of the hippies' "Summer of Love" compared with the realities of love under capitalism."

In "Garden of Earthly Delights", Byrd wrote the lyrics for the first verse and chorus; Moskowitz came with the track's title and some of the melody and lyrics. On "Coming Down", Moskowitz contributed to the melody line as well as writing the second and third verses. On "Hard Coming Love", Byrd wrote the title and first verse, and Moskowitz contributed what she referred to as the "lame doggerel that follows". Byrd's song "Love Song for the Dead Ché" reflects his leftist views; Columbia Records originally wanted the title changed because of its political implications. Two tracks, "Where Is Yesterday" and "Stranded in Time", were written by Marron and Bogas. Byrd later described "Stranded in Time", arranged by Marron, as "a weak Beatle-esque copy of 'Eleanor Rigby', [which] could not be performed live because it called for string quartet. It should never have been included [on the album], but Dave Rubinson loved it."

The record was released in early 1968, at a time when there was a receptive audience for “underground music” which combined musical experimentalism with radical social and/or political lyrics – other examples, in their very different ways, including The Velvet Underground (who shared a common background in the New York experimental music scene; according to Moskowitz, Nico at one point tried to join the USA), Frank Zappa (whom Byrd disliked, considering him a niche-marketer "subsumed in a self-referential loop"), Love's Forever Changes, Country Joe and the Fish, and Jefferson Airplane.

The album is littered with references to Byrd's obsession with old-time American music such as the Dixieland jazz intro on "I Won't Leave My Wooden Wife for You, Sugar". "The American Metaphysical Circus" starts out with five layers of sound being heard in a collage: a calliope playing "National Emblem", a ragtime piano playing "At a Georgia Camp Meeting", two marching bands playing "Marching Through Georgia" and "The Red, White and Blue" switching between left and right channels. The other two tracks are of electronic sounds. The marching bands were arranged and conducted by Byrd, rather than being taken from existing recordings.

Whether intended or not, the record took the form of a coherent song cycle, a radical commentary on contemporary American society. The words ranged from satires on decadence ("The American Metaphysical Circus", "... Wooden Wife..." (this title being a parody of the 1905 music hall song "I Wouldn't Leave My Little Wooden Hut for You" by Tom Mellor and Charles Collins)) to lyrical expressions of longing (the pastoral "Cloud Song", the political "Love Song for the Dead Che"). Musically, the songs ranged from pseudo-classical elegance ("Stranded in Time" and "Where Is Yesterday") to aggressive discordance and hard rock ("The Garden of Earthly Delights" and "Hard Coming Love"), with heavy electronic distortion and collages of music such as brass bands, in line with Byrd being heavily influenced by Charles Ives. The final suite, "The American Way of Love", integrates most of these elements, with a dreamlike ending containing a collage of earlier tracks. According to Lillian Roxon, the three-part suite "dealt most explicitly with the activities of homosexual prostitutes on New York's notorious 42nd Street".

=== Break-up ===
The band fell apart shortly after their album was released. One factor was disagreement between Byrd, Marron and Bogas over musical direction, with Marron's promotion of lighter "McCartney-esque" material conflicting with Byrd's original vision for the band, and conversely Marron and Bogas becoming unhappy with the priority given to Byrd's songs. Dissent led to a backstage fist fight between Marron and Byrd after the band's performance supporting the Troggs at the Fillmore East, when the English band's fans had heckled the United States of America and Byrd and Marron competed against each other in turning up the volumes on their amplifiers. At another show in Orange County, band members were busted for smoking marijuana during the show, leading to it having to be completed by just Moskowitz and Byrd, who later complained that Marron, Forbes and Woodson were "often sloppy in performance" as a result of their drug use.

There were tensions between Byrd on one side, and Moskowitz and Rubinson on the other. Byrd commented that "as I tried to make our sound harder, Dorothy was trying to go softer, perhaps responding to an unconscious influence of autobiographic women songwriters of the time: Janis Ian, Laura Nyro, and Joni Mitchell." According to Byrd, there was a lack of enthusiasm for the band from the record company, who felt challenged by both the band's music and Byrd's politics. In contrast, Moskowitz has said that the company were "just trying to market us", and "we were the ones who were being sanctimonious ... [and] rigid ...", also claiming that producer Rubinson lost interest in the band after Agnello left. A further factor was other band members' unhappiness with the initial mixing of the album in New York City by Byrd and Rubinson, which, when played back in Los Angeles, according to Byrd, sounded "utterly wimpy and lame. The band blamed me, and they were right. My credibility with my own musicians suffered immeasurably."

Moskowitz has referred to the band's "internal conflicts, fisticuffs and power struggles." Byrd has claimed that "Columbia dumped me from the band"; specifically, that Rubinson and the band's manager Malcolm Terrence manoeuvered to remove him, and promote Moskowitz as the band's figurehead and potential solo star. Though Moskowitz disputes that claim, she also said that "although I didn't agree with David [Rubinson] aesthetically, I felt loyal to him. He was, after all, the one who had put us on the map." In any event, Byrd announced that he was leaving, and, according to Moskowitz, when he changed his mind, "the manager pleaded with me to accept him back, but I wouldn't. There was never a conspiracy towards a solo career or some 'back story' between Rubinson and myself. It was primarily intransigence and anger about band governance on my part that propelled the final train wreck."

Byrd subsequently commented: "The idea was to create a radical experience. It didn't succeed. For one thing, I had assembled too many personalities; every rehearsal became group therapy. A band that wants to succeed needs a single, mutually acceptable identity. I tried to do it democratically, and it was not successful." Rubinson said: "Joe Byrd was one of the most insane examples of control freak that I've, to this day, ever experienced ... he was really bizarre, and a very, very difficult person to deal with. So there were constant personality conflicts in and among the band. People quitting, people getting replaced, arguments, yelling about intonation, and so forth. They were very talented people, and I don't think they liked being dictated to. But he had a vision of what he wanted."

Marron, Forbes and Bogas left the band after their East Coast tour in spring 1968. After Byrd also left, Rubinson and Moskowitz attempted to keep the band name alive, and Moskowitz recorded several tracks in July 1968 with a new and more conventional band of Los Angeles musicians: Jeff Marinell (guitar), Richard Grayson (keyboard), Carmie Simon (bass), and Dennis Wood (drums). Their recordings surfaced on the 2004 CD reissue of The United States of America. However, plans to continue with the band soon came to nothing.

== Reception and legacy ==
The album was described by critic Richie Unterberger as "a near classic", "a tour de force (though not without its flaws) of experimental rock that blended surprisingly melodic sensibilities with unnerving blasts of primitive synthesizers and lyrics that could range from misty romanticism to hard-edged irony. For the relatively few who heard it, the record was a signpost to the future with its collision of rock and classical elements, although the material crackled with a tension that reflected the United States of America itself in the late '60s." Describing Moskowitz's vocals as "reminiscent of an icier Grace Slick", he also said that the electronic textures crafted by Byrd "were not simulations of strings and horns, but exhilarating, frightening swoops and bleeps that lent a fierce crunch to the faster numbers, and a beguiling serenity to the ballads."

According to Unterberger, "the very fact that the equipment was so primitive... lent a spontaneous resonance and warmth that has rarely been achieved by subsequent synthesizer technology." Producer David Rubinson commented:

The ring modulator and the volt-control oscillators and voltage control filters – they didn't come in a set, like they did in a Moog. You had to build each one – which they did – and actually hard-wire them together. It was an eight-track album. So all that synthesized stuff was painstakingly layered in, sound by sound, one oscillator at a time. Now you may get a bank of oscillators and you can run six, eight, twelve of them in a row, and make all kinds of wonderful waves, shapes, and it can be very complicated. But at that time, it was not possible. It had one oscillator, one ring modulator, one voltage control filter – that's it. It looked funny. It was like aluminum boxes, little knobs sticking out, and patch cords. And it was very exciting to me, because it was a marriage of a lot of what was happening in what people called classical music at the time. When people think about what Steve Reich was doing then, and Terry Riley was doing then, and what Joe Byrd was doing then, it was very, very similar in different areas.

According to critic Kevin Holm-Hudson, "what distinguishes the United States of America from some of its contemporaries ... is the seriousness and skill with which they incorporated avant-garde and other influences into their music."

Despite the widespread support of music critics, the album sold poorly and soon disappeared—at least in the US, although in the UK it remained fondly remembered, in part because of one track ("Wooden Wife") being used on a popular budget-price CBS sampler album, The Rock Machine Turns You On. The band was later described as an influence by several British bands, including Portishead and Broadcast. The band's album was first reissued on CD in 1997, and in an expanded edition by Sundazed Music in 2004.

== Later activities ==
- Joseph Byrd (1937–2025) went on to record a second album for Columbia, The American Metaphysical Circus, credited to Joe Byrd and the Field Hippies, in 1969. Byrd also released a number of additional recordings under his own name, as well as scoring films, writing music for television and commercials, and working as a music producer. In the 1970s he founded the Yankee Doodle Society, dedicated to the popular music of the mid-19th century, and released several albums of songs of the period. He was married, lived in northern California near the Oregon border, and from 2000 had taught music-related classes at the College of the Redwoods.
- Dorothy Moskowitz (born 1940) later became a member of Country Joe McDonald's All-Star Band, touring and recording with them and appearing on McDonald's 1973 album, Paris Sessions. She also composed theater music, recorded commercials, and sang jazz in clubs. She married in 1978, taking the name Dorothy Falarski, and had two daughters. She began writing music for children in the 1980s and 1990s. In 2003, she became a music teacher for elementary schools in Piedmont, California, introducing students to the basics of brass instruments and vocal techniques. She has developed a number of other music projects in the San Francisco Bay area and lives in a suburb of Oakland, California.
- Gordon Marron (born 1943) became a Los Angeles studio musician on recordings by David Ackles, Carole King, Alice Coltrane, Helen Reddy and others. He co-wrote the Vic Dana song "The Love in Your Eyes", and worked on film soundtracks with composer Reid Reilich. He later moved to Kauai, Hawaii, where he continues to perform on violin and keyboards.
- Craig Woodson (born 1943) gained a doctorate from UCLA and recorded with David Ackles, Linda Ronstadt and others before starting a small business making ethnic musical instruments in the 1970s. He also worked as a percussion teacher, lecturer and consultant, as well as presenting educational concerts and touring with the Kronos Quartet. He won several patents for musical instrument technology, and led a three-year project in Ghana producing instruments for use in local schools. He founded Ethnomusic, Inc., a world music education consultancy, in 1976. For two years, he was senior director of education at the Rock and Roll Hall of Fame. He later lived in Ohio. In 1998, Woodson arranged a ceremony to apologise for his white ancestors' involvement in the slavery that had oppressed members of Carter G. Woodson's family. Following the reconciliation, both sides of the family developed the Black White Families Reconciliation (BWFR) Protocol, using the creative arts, particularly drumming and storytelling, with the aim of healing racial divides within black and white families who share a surname.
- Ed Bogas (born 1942) composed soundtracks for Peanuts and Garfield TV cartoon specials and for Ralph Bakshi's film Fritz the Cat.
- Rand Forbes (January 28, 1947–December 23, 2020) became a software engineer. He worked as an Oracle database administrator, and owned a software development company. He later lived in the Cleveland, Ohio area, close to Craig Woodson. He died in 2020 following a lengthy illness and after contracting COVID-19.

== Discography ==
=== Studio albums ===
Year	Title	Peak chart positions	
Year	Title	UK	US
1968	The United States of America: Released: March 6, 1968; Label: Columbia; Formats: Compact disc, vinyl	—	181

=== Singles ===
- "The Garden of Earthly Delights" / "Love Song for the Dead Ché" (CBS 3745, UK, 1968)
- "Hard Coming Love" / "Osamu's Birthday" (Sundazed, 2004)
