= Charlie Allen (singer) =

American singer (1942–1990)

- Born: May 1, 1942
- Died: May 7, 1990 (aged 48)
- Genres: Rock, blues, R&B
- Occupations: Musician, singer, songwriter
- Instruments: Vocals, drums
- Years active: 1967–1974
- Labels: Columbia, Dunhill
- Formerly of: Bluesberry Jam, Canned Heat, Pacific Gas & Electric

Charles E. Allen (May 1, 1942 – May 7, 1990) was one of the founding members of blues and rock outfit Pacific Gas & Electric and the vocalist for the group. By 1968, the group consisted of Charlie Allen, Frank Cook, Tom Marshall, Brent Block, and guitarist Glenn Schwartz. Besides being remembered for his association with Pacific Gas & Electric, Allen is perhaps best remembered for the hit single "Are You Ready?" that he co-wrote with John Hill which besides being a hit for Pacific Gas & Electric has been covered by The Staple Singers, and DeGarmo and Key.

== Band Pacific Gas & Electric ==
Allen was originally the drummer for the Pacific Gas And Electric Blues Band. His vocal abilities meant that he was destined to be the band's frontman so he was placed up front and Frank Cook, the former drummer for Canned Heat, became the drummer. Allen would remain the front man for the band right up until the breakup of the group.

The group became popular and appeared at many concerts along with other big name bands. They also appeared in, and contributed music to the Otto Preminger directed film Tell Me That You Love Me, Junie Moon starring Liza Minnelli, James Coco and Fred Williamson in an early role.

Allen displayed some promising songwriting skills. On their third album, self-titled, he wrote "Bluesbuster", "Miss Lucy", "My Women" with Tom Marshall, and along with John Hill "Death Row #172". Another song with the same kind of theme written by Allen was "Mother, Why Do You Cry?" on the Are You Ready? album, a tale about a young man in jail coming to terms with his fate.

The group went through a series of personnel changes and when the fourth album was released the name was shortened to PG&E.

In 1973 the last album Pacific Gas & Electric starring Charlie Allen was released on the Dunhill label. By this time he was the only original member, and the album was more or less Allen's debut solo album.

== Personal ==
Allen died in 1990.

== Discography ==
- Pacific Gas & Electric Starring Charlie Allen – Dunhill DSX-50157
  - "Gumbo Jones" (Allen, Hill, Michlin) 4:43
  - "Roll Georgia" (Allen, Hill, Michlin) 5:16
  - "Somebody You Love" (Dino, Sembello) 2:49
  - "Hold On" (Allen, Hill, Michlin) 2:59
  - "Dancin' in the Fire" (Allen, Hill, Michlin) 4:49
  - "Good Gospel Music" (Allen, Hill, Michlin) 5:44
  - "I Hear the Trumpets" (Calling Allen, Hill) 2:46
  - "Some Kind of Feelin'" (Allen, Hill, Michlin) 4:43
  - "I Got a Thing About You, Baby" (White) 2:37
  - "Sunshine Embrace" (Allen) 2:53
  - "Niggers in the Woods" (Allen, Hill, Michlin) 2:03
