= Yankee Transcendoodle =

Studio album by Joseph Byrd
- Released: 1976
- Genre: Electronic, marches
- Label: Takoma Records
- Producer: Jon Monday and Charel Morris

Professional ratings
Review scores
Source	Rating
Christgau's Record Guide	B

Yankee Transcendoodle is an album by Joseph Byrd of patriotic music where all the sounds are produced by synthesizer. The album was released in 1976 on Takoma Records.

== Track listing ==
1. The Star-Spangled Banner
2. The Yankee Doodle Boy
3. Tramp! Tramp! Tramp!
4. The Red, White and Blue (Columbia, the Gem of the Ocean)
5. Hail, Columbia
6. America the Beautiful
7. Hold the Fort (Philip Bliss, 1870)
8. John Brown's Body (The Battle Hymn of the Republic)
9. Battle Cry of Freedom (Rally Round the Flag)
10. National Emblem
11. Wake Nicodemus! (Henry Clay Work, 1864)
12. The World Turned Upside Down
13. Chester
14. The Washington Post
15. You're a Grand Old Flag
16. The Bonnie Blue Flag / Dixie
17. Kingdom Coming
18. Home! Sweet Home!
19. Conquest of the American Wilderness (Joseph Byrd)
20. The Stars and Stripes Forever
21. Grand Centennial Hymn
22. Lilly Bell Quickstep (G.W.E. Friederich, 1854)

== Credits ==
- Charel Morris - Producer and Mixing Engineer
- Douglas Decker - Mixing Engineer
- Garry Margolis - Photography
- John Bucchino - Keyboards
- Jon Monday - Producer
- Joseph Byrd - Synthesizer, Keyboards, arranger
- Theresa Abramian - Artwork
