= Are You Ready? (Pacific Gas & Electric song) =

Single by Pacific Gas & Electric

from the album Are You Ready?
- B-side: "Staggolee"
- Released: April 22, 1970
- Length: 5:49 (Album Version); 3:00 (Promo Single Version)
- Label: Columbia 45158
- Songwriters: Charlie Allen, John Hill
- Producer: John Hill

Pacific Gas & Electric singles chronology
"Bluesbuster" (1969)	"Are You Ready?" (1970)	"Father Come on Home" (1970)

"Are You Ready?" is a song written by Charlie Allen and John Hill and performed by Pacific Gas & Electric. It reached No. 14 on the Billboard Hot 100 and No. 49 on the R&B chart in 1970. The band featured it on their 1970 album Are You Ready?

The song was produced by John Hill and featured the back-up vocal group The Blackberries.

The album version was nearly 6 minutes in length and had to be cut down to 3 minutes for the promo single, resulting in omitting the slower recitative Introduction, the omission of the first verse: "People say he won't come", pertaining to the unmentioned Jesus Christ. This reference was considered too controversial for AM airplay, especially in rural areas, the Deep South, and the Bible Belt sections of the United States. The instrumental and the repeated call and response sections in the coda were shortened: "Yes, I'm Ready", and "Yes, Yes, I'm Ready". The edit version ends with the fading repeat of the chorus section.

The single was ranked No. 93 on Billboard's Year-End Hot 100 singles of 1970. Music critic Robert Christgau has called it "easily [the band's] best cut ever".

The song found a resurgence after being featured in the third episode of Season 3's The Righteous Gemstones.

== Charts ==
=== Weekly charts ===
Chart (1969/70)	Peak position
Australia (Kent Music Report)	44
Belgium (Ultratop 50 Flanders)	1
Belgium (Ultratop 50 Wallonia)	3
Canada (RPM)	8
Italy (Musica e Dischi)	19
Netherlands (Dutch Top 40)	2
Netherlands (Single Top 100)	2
Switzerland (Schweizer Hitparade)	9
United States (Billboard)	14
West Germany (GfK)	16

=== Year-end charts ===
Chart (1970)	Peak position
USA (Billboard 100)	93

== Other versions ==
- DeGarmo and Key, on their 1984 album, Communication.
- The Staple Singers, as a single in 1985; it reached No. 39 on the R&B chart.
