= Pacific Gas & Electric (band) =

American rock band

- Also known as: Pacific Gas and Electric Blues Band, PG&E
- Origin: Los Angeles, California, United States
- Genres: Blues rock; soul; psychedelic rock
- Years active: 1967–1973
- Labels: Kent, Columbia, Dunhill

Pacific Gas & Electric was an American rock band in the late 1960s and early 1970s, fronted by singer Charlie Allen. Their biggest hit was the gospel-tinged "Are You Ready?" in 1970.

== Music ==
The band's music encompasses blues, blues rock, soul, soul-rock, psychedelic rock, jazz and jazz rock.

== History ==
The band was formed in Los Angeles, California, United States, in 1967, by guitarist Tom Marshall, bassist Brent Block, lead guitarist Glenn Schwartz (formerly of The James Gang) and drummer Charlie Allen, who had previously played in the band Bluesberry Jam. Allen was selected to be lead vocalist, and Frank Cook later joined on drums.

Originally known as The Pacific Gas and Electric Blues Band, they shortened their name when they signed to Power Records, releasing the album Get It On in early 1968. The record was not a success, but following the band's performance at the Miami Pop Festival in December 1968, they were signed by Columbia Records.

Their first album for Columbia, Pacific Gas and Electric, was issued in 1969, but they achieved greater success with their next album, Are You Ready, in 1970. The title track "Are You Ready?" reached No. 14 on the Billboard Hot 100.

After the album was recorded, Cook was injured in a car accident and was replaced on drums by Ron Woods, with Cook staying on as manager. Marshall and Schwartz left and were replaced by Frank Petricca (bass) and Ken Utterback (guitar), with Brent Block moving to rhythm guitar before leaving later in 1970. Unusually for the time, the band contained both black and white musicians, which led to rioting and gunfire on one occasion when the band, who toured widely, performed in Raleigh, North Carolina. Film footage of the band playing at the Kentucky federal narcotics farm exists and was used for the imagery in a later music video. During the recording of the album `PG&E’, Charlie Allen was not happy with the direction of his band; he had his own vision, and direction. First, he wanted to tour England and Europe where `Are You Ready’ was topping the charts. The band changed their name to, `PG&E’, following pressure from the utility company of the same name (similar to Chicago Transit Authority becoming Chicago.)

== Career ==
The group released the album Get It On on the Power Records label. It debuted at No. 181 in the Billboard Top LPs chart for the week of 1 February 1969.

In March 1969, the group played at the Fillmore East. The concert was opened by The Collectors. Following them, Pacific Gas & Electric's performance was seen by music journalist Fred Kirby. The group opened with "Every Day I Have the Blues" which was recorded by BB King. They also performed "Cry, Cry, Cry" from their Power label album which Kirby called an exceptional number. Also, in his review which was published in the 29 March issue of Billboard, he wrote that Charlie Allen was a fine blues singer, Glenn Schwartz ranked along with the best of pop's guitarists and bassist Brent Block and rhythm guitarist Tom Marshall were steady throughout the show. Drummer Frank Cook performed a drum solo which was outstanding and he more than held his own. After their set was finished, they were followed by Procol Harum.

The group released the single "Bluesbuster" / "Redneck" in October 1969. The A side was written by Charlie Allen and the B side by Joe South. It was a four-star pick in the 25 October issue of Record World. Referring to Pacific Gas & Electric as an underground blues group, the reviewer called the song "an aptly titled number". It was also a Billboard Special Merit Spotlight single for the same week. The reviewer wrote that the song was a solid blues rocker with a solid performance and that it should soon make the Hot 100. A Choice Programming single in the 1 November issue of Cash Box, the reviewer wrote that it had enough Top Forty momentum to breakout nationally, and the flip side "Redneck" could generate extra interest for them.

Frank Cook was dismissed and replaced by Tim Rose's manager Jack Beale (John L Beale, Jr.). Frank Petricca stayed on as bass; drummer Ron Woods and percussionist Joe Lala were replaced by drummer Alvin Taylor. Kenny Utterback was replaced by rising young guitarist, Paul Warren. Allen later added a horn section to join the band, consisting of Jerry Aiello (keyboards), Stanley Abernathy (trumpet), Alfred Galagos and Virgil Gonsalves (saxophones).

Allen and Beale put together a one-and-a-half-year game place for the group, encompassing Allen's vision of creating a more cohesive band while working on new material. The group hired an agent who secured the band gigs across the United States.

Beale contacted Terry King, who was also Tim Rose's booking agent in London, and King secured an extensive European for the group. The band opened for Pink Floyd at the Olympic Stadium in Amsterdam; Brian Auger & The Trinity with Julie Driscoll in the Olympic Stadium in West Berlin; concerts, venues and festivals in Germany, Belgium, Switzerland, Italy along with numerous television appearances.

Toward the end of the tour, Allen began to feel poorly. Upon returning to Hollywood, doctors suggested detox, rehabilitation, and bed rest. Consequently, the band broke up.

A final album, using the name Pacific Gas & Electric Starring Charlie Allen, was recorded by Allen with studio musicians and released on the Dunhill label in 1973.

== Members ==
- Charlie Allen – vocals (1967–1973) (died 1990)
- Glenn Schwartz – guitar (1967–1970) (died 2018)
- Tom Marshall – guitar (1967–1970)
- Brent Block – bass (1967–1970)
- Frank Cook – drums (1967–1970) (died 2021)
- Ken Utterback – guitar (1970–1971)
- Frank Petricca – bass (1970–1972)
- Ron Woods – drums (1970–1972)
- Jerry Aiello – keys (1971–1972)
- Joe Lala – percussion (1971) (died 2014)
- Alvin Taylor – drums (1971–1972)
- Stanley Abernathy – trumpet (1971–1972)
- Alfred Galagos – saxophone (1971–1972)
- Virgil Gonsalves – saxophone (1971–1972) (died 2008)
- Paul Warren – guitar (1972)
- Casey Foutz – keys (1972) (died 1974)
- Noel Norris – trumpet (1972)
- Geoff Peach – saxophone (1972)

Period	Members	Releases
1967 (briefly)	Charlie Allen – drums; Glenn Schwartz – guitar; Tom Marshall – guitar; Brent Block – bass	
1967–1970	Charlie Allen – vocals; Glenn Schwartz – guitar; Tom Marshall – guitar; Brent Block – bass; Frank Cook – drums	Get It On (1968); Pacific Gas and Electric (1969); Are You Ready? (1970)
1970	Charlie Allen – vocals; Glenn Schwartz – guitar; Tom Marshall – guitar; Brent Block – bass; Ron Woods – drums	
1970	Charlie Allen – vocals; Brent Block – guitar; Ron Woods – drums; Ken Utterback – guitar; Frank Petricca – bass	
1970–1971	Charlie Allen – vocals; Ron Woods – drums; Ken Utterback – guitar; Frank Petricca – bass	
1971	Charlie Allen – vocals; Ron Woods – drums; Ken Utterback – guitar; Frank Petricca – bass; Jerry Aiello – keys; Joe Lala – percussions	PG&E (1971)
1971	Charlie Allen – vocals; Ken Utterback – guitar; Frank Petricca – bass; Jerry Aiello – keys; Alvin Taylor – drums	
1971–1972	Charlie Allen – vocals; Ken Utterback – guitar; Frank Petricca – bass; Jerry Aiello – keys; Alvin Taylor – drums; Stanley Abernathy – trumpet; Alfred Galagos – saxophone; Virgil Gonsalves – saxophone	
1972	Charlie Allen – vocals; Frank Petricca – bass; Alvin Taylor – drums; Paul Warren – guitar; Casey Foutz – keys; Noel Norris – trumpet; Geoff Peach – saxophone	
1972–1973	Charlie Allen – vocals	Starring Charlie Allen (1973)

== Members' lives post-band ==
Tom Marshall later suffered deteriorating health and personal circumstances, being homeless since the 1980s.

Frank Petricca became a commodity broker.

Charlie Allen died on May 7, 1990, aged 48.

Glenn Schwartz became the guitarist for the Gospel rock group All Saved Freak Band. He died on November 3, 2018, aged 77.

Frank Cook became a qualified psychologist, and died on July 9, 2021, aged 79.

Alvin Taylor became a much sought after studio drummer, working with the likes of Elton John, George Harrison, Billy Preston on the very first episode of `Saturday Night Live’, among others.

Paul Warren formed his own group, The Express, and later became Rod Stewart's touring guitarist.

== Discography ==
=== Albums ===
Year	Album	USA	Aus	Canada	Record label
1968	Get It On	159	–	–	Power Records
1969	Pacific Gas and Electric	91	38	–	Columbia Records
1970	Are You Ready?	101	-	48	Columbia Records
1971	PG&E	182	–	–	Columbia Records
1973	Starring Charlie Allen	–	–	–	Dunhill Records
1973	The Best of PG&E	–	–	–	Columbia Records
2007	Live 'N' Kicking at Lexington	–	–	–	Wounded Bird Records

=== Singles ===
Year	Title	Peak chart positions				Record Label	B-side	Album
Year	Title	US	R&B	CAN	AUS	Record Label	B-side	Album
1968	"Wade in the Water"	–	–	–	–	Power Records	"Live Love"	Get It On
1969	"Bluesbuster"	–	–	–	–	Columbia Records	"Redneck"	Pacific Gas and Electric
1970	"Are You Ready?"	14	49	8	44	Columbia Records	"Staggolee"	Are You Ready?
1970	"Father Come on Home"	93	–	–	–	Columbia Records	"Elvira"	
1970	"Stormy Times"	-	–	–	81	Tempo Records Australia	"Live Love"	
1971	"The Hunter"	–	–	–	27	Kent Records	"Long Handled Shovel"	Motor City's Burning
1971	"The Time Has Come (To Make Your Peace)"	–	–	–	–	Columbia Records	"Death Row #172"	PG&E
1971	"One More River to Cross"	–	–	–	–	Columbia Records	"Rock and Roller's Lament"	PG&E
1971	"Thank God for You Baby"	97	50	–	–	Columbia Records	"See the Monkey Run"	PG&E
1972	"(Love is Like a) Heat Wave"	–	–	–	–	Columbia Records	"We Did What We Could Do"	The Best of PG&E
