= The United States of America (album) =

Studio album by the United States of America
- Released: March 6, 1968
- Recorded: December 1967
- Studio: CBS, Hollywood
- Genre: Psychedelic rock; art rock; experimental rock; psychedelic pop; electronic rock
- Length: 37:07
- Label: Columbia
- Producer: David Rubinson

Alternative cover
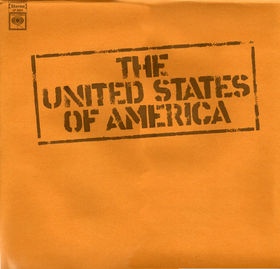

Singles from The United States of America
- 1. "The Garden of Earthly Delights" / "Love Song for the Dead Ché" Released: 18 October 1968 (UK only); 2. "Hard Coming Love" Released: 2004

The United States of America is the only studio album by American psychedelic rock band the United States of America. Produced by David Rubinson, it was released in 1968 by Columbia Records. The album combined rock and psychedelia with then-uncommon electronic instrumentation and experimental composition, along with an approach reflecting an anti-establishment, leftist political stance.

The United States of America received limited attention on its initial release and charted at number 181 on the Billboard 200. The band broke up shortly after the album's release amidst interpersonal disputes. The album has been reissued several times and has garnered widespread critical acclaim in the decades since its original release for pioneering styles and techniques that would later become common in rock music.

== Background ==
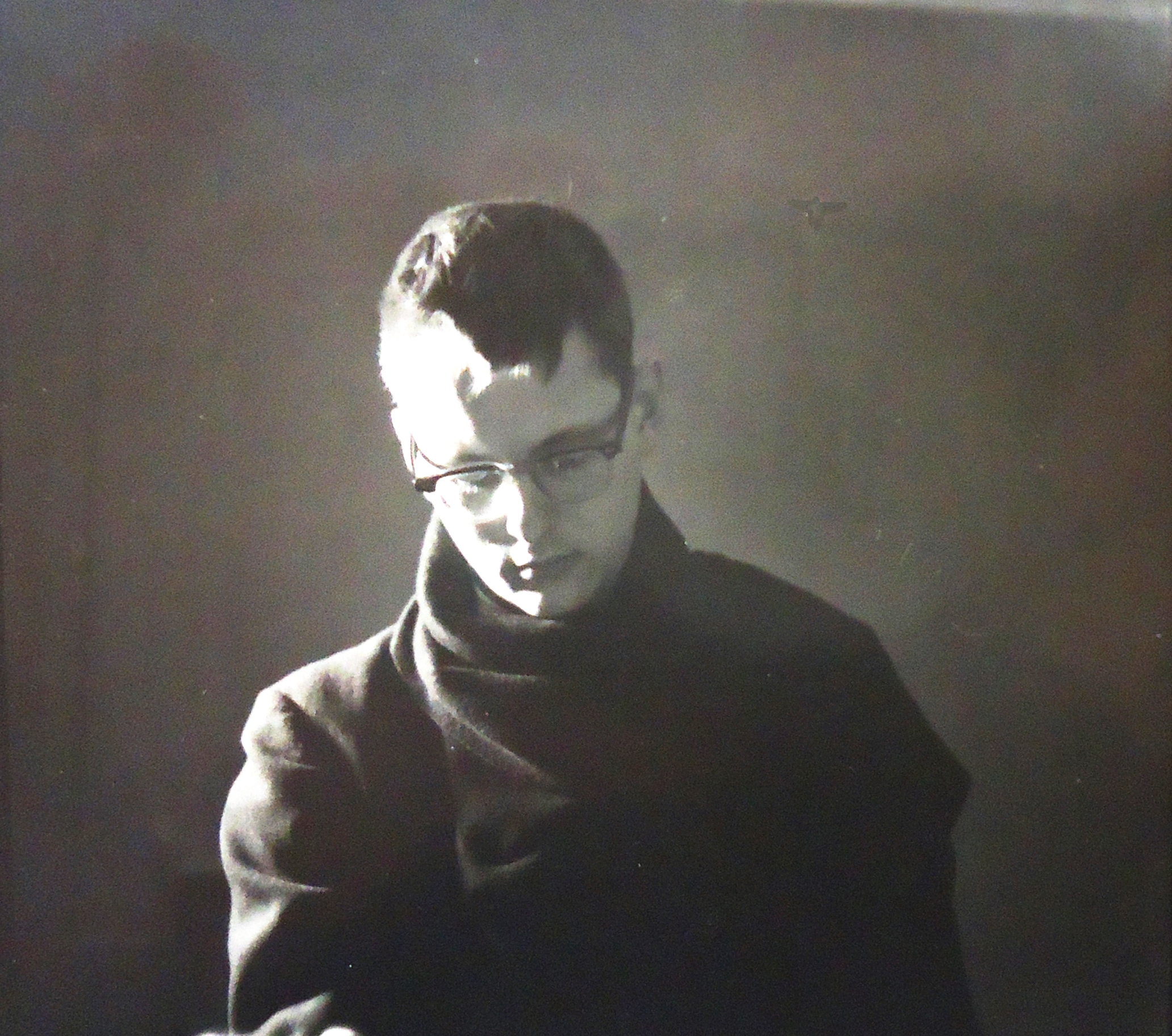
Joseph Byrd in 1961

Joseph Byrd and Dorothy Moskowitz first met in New York City in 1963. Byrd at the time worked as an assistant to composer Virgil Thomson, and later as an arranger and producer. Moskowitz was a music student at Barnard College, where she was mentored by composer Otto Luening. The two began a "profound musical and personal relationship", and moved to Los Angeles later that year after Byrd received a teaching assistantship at UCLA. While at UCLA, Byrd formed the New Music Workshop, an avant-garde art collective, alongside Moskowitz, jazz musician Don Ellis and others. Byrd left his job at UCLA in 1966 to focus on producing art, music and organizing happenings full-time. Around the same time, Byrd and Moskowitz also contributed to Vocal And Instrumental Ragas From South India, an album of Indian classical music released on Folkways Records, alongside Gayathri Rajapur and Harihar Rao.

In early 1967, Byrd approached Art Kunkin, founder and editor of the Los Angeles Free Press, requesting money with which to form a band, in collaboration with anarchist composer Michael Agnello as organist. By this time, Byrd and Moskowitz had broken up, with Moskowitz returning to New York, but she accepted an offer from Byrd to return to Los Angeles and serve as the lead singer for the band. The other members of the band had also all been involved with avant-garde music and ethnomusicology. The name "United States of America" was intended to be provocative, by appropriating the full official name of the United States as a way to express contempt for the government, and was later described by Moskowitz as "like hanging the flag upside down".

== Production ==
The United States of America was produced by David Rubinson, who also signed the group to Columbia Records. Rubinson previously knew members Joseph Byrd and Dorothy Moskowitz. Creating the electronic sounds on the album was difficult because of the technical limitations. Byrd recalled "the only available functioning keyable synthesizers were Robert Moog's at +$20,000. We were left with whatever sounds I could squeeze from three variable wave shape generators, modulating one another." The oscillators were built for the group by Richard Durrett. Electronic devices were used live and on the album to process other instruments and Moskowitz's voice. Towards the end of the song "The American Metaphysical Circus", for instance, her vocals are distorted to the point of being almost unintelligible.

== Music ==
=== Style ===
"The American Metaphysical Circus"
Excerpt from the opening track "The American Metaphysical Circus", showcasing Dorothy Moskowitz's electronically distorted vocals and use of effects

Joseph Byrd, the band's leader, stated that his aesthetic aim for the band and album was to create avant-garde, political rock music; he envisioned that their music would combine electronic sounds (not electronic music), musical and political radicalism, and performance art. During the 1960s, Byrd was drawn towards the Communist Party USA, explaining that it was "the one group that had discipline, an agenda, and was willing to work within the existing institutions to educate and radicalize American society." The song "Love Song for the Dead Ché" reflects these ideas. Columbia Records originally wanted the song's title changed due to its political implications. Byrd suggested "Julius and Ethel Rosenberg" as a replacement title if the original title had not been used.

The album is littered with references to Byrd's obsession with old-time American music, such as the Dixieland jazz intro on "I Won't Leave My Wooden Wife for You, Sugar". "The American Metaphysical Circus" starts out with no fewer than five layers of sound being heard in a collage, including a calliope playing "National Emblem", a ragtime piano playing "At a Georgia Camp Meeting", and two marching bands playing "Marching Through Georgia" and "The Red, White and Blue" switching between left and right channels. The other two layers are of electronic sounds. In addition, the album retains influence from more conventional forms of rock music while syncretizing it with traditional American, classical, Indian, jazz and electronic influences. While tracks such as "Hard Coming Love" and "Coming Down" more closely resemble traditional psychedelic rock music, others such as "Cloud Song" and "I Won't Leave My Wooden Wife for You" divert further from this formula. Byrd described "Stranded in Time" as "a weak Beatle-esque copy of "Eleanor Rigby", and could not be performed live because it called for a string quartet. That, incidentally, is the only tune on the album I didn't arrange."

=== Lyrics ===
Dorothy Moskowitz and Joseph Byrd collaborated as lyricists on the album for most of the songs. Writing for AllMusic, Richie Unterberger described the opening track, "The American Metaphysical Circus" as possibly "[serving] as an allegory for the whole psychedelic era, whether it was deciding to take chances with drugs or take chances by altering one's whole approach to life". On "The Garden of Earthly Delights", Ed Bogas wrote the lyrics for the first verse and chorus, while Moskowitz came up with the track's title and other tuneful changes and accents. Unterberger described the song as likely inspired by the Garden of Eden with the chorus possibly referring to the temptations that led humanity out of the garden. On "Coming Down", Moskowitz contributed the melody line and lyrics for the second and third verses. On "Hard Coming Love", Byrd wrote the title and first verse, and Moskowitz contributed to what she referred to as the "lame doggerel that follows". "Cloud Song" was an adaptation of text featured in Winnie-the-Pooh by A. A. Milne, and was subtitled in the liner notes as "inspired by Pooh". The closing track, "The American Way of Love", references gay prostitution on 42nd Street, then known as a red-light district of New York City. Byrd described the lyrics of "The American Metaphysical Circus" and "The American Way of Love" as commenting on media manipulation and the "bourgeois sentimentality of the hippies' 'Summer of Love' compared with the realities of love under capitalism".

== Release ==
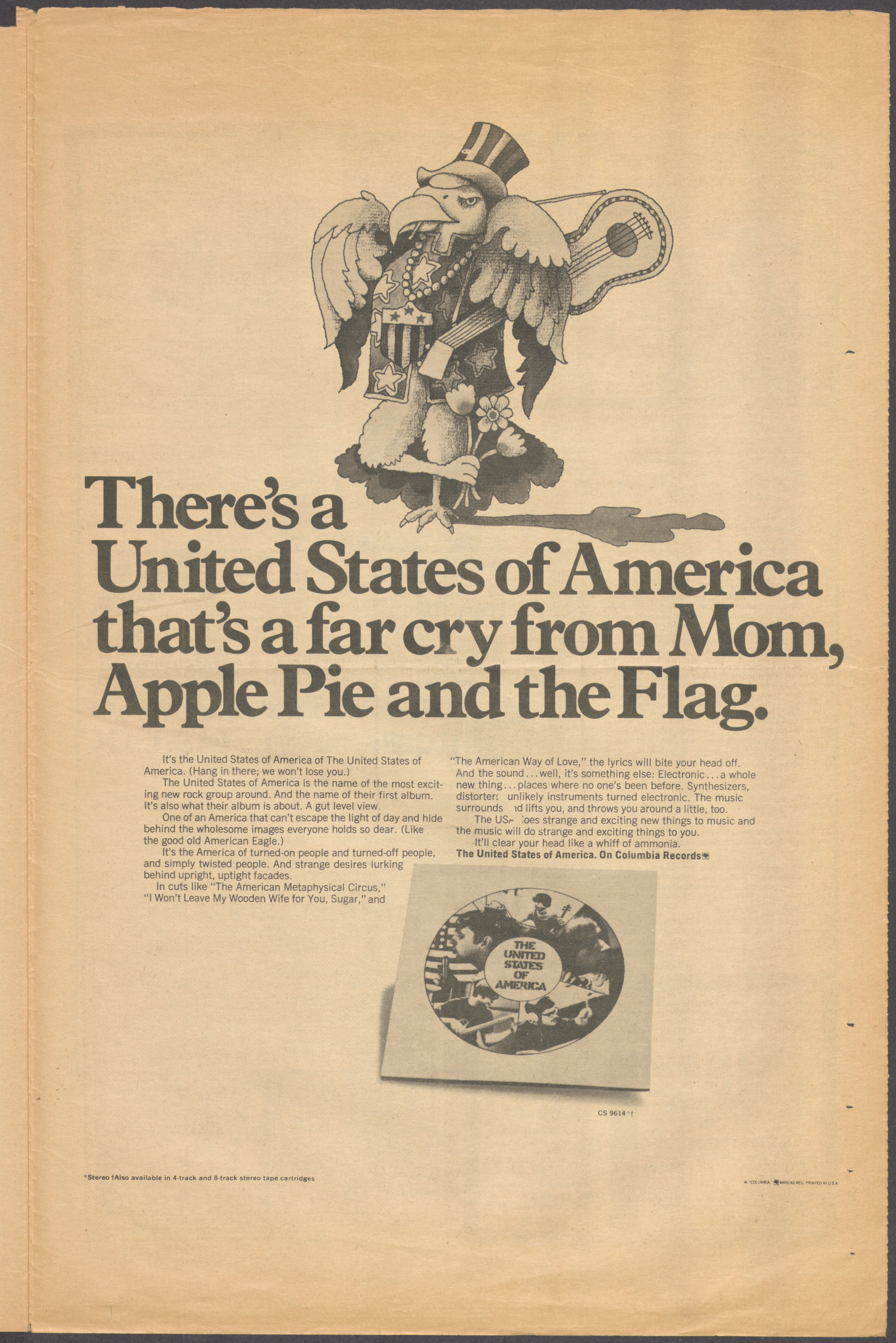
Advert for the album published in Helix, May 1968

The United States of America was released in 1968 by Columbia Records. The album spent nine weeks on the Billboard albums chart in the United States, peaking at number 181 in May 1968. It failed to chart in the United Kingdom. Arguments between Byrd and the rest of his bandmates about the band's direction led the band to split up within months of the album's release. Moskowitz further noted conflict between the band's unwilling to compromise and the demands of Columbia Records.

In 1968, CBS Records released The Rock Machine Turns You On, the first budget sampler LP, in a number of European countries. The song "I Won't Leave My Wooden Wife for You, Sugar" was included as the fourth track on the sampler. The record sold an estimated 140,000 copies, and helped spread awareness of the band in the UK.

The United States of America was reissued on compact disc by Columbia in 1992 with two bonus tracks. In 1997, the album was reissued in the United Kingdom by Edsel Records. On June 29, 2004, Sundazed Records reissued the album on vinyl and CD with a new album cover differing from the cover used for the original UK and Europe releases, and with the CD version containing 10 bonus tracks. Joseph Byrd claims to have had little input on the Sundazed reissue of the album. Byrd says he had been "interested in doing notes, and I figured this was a chance to get my voice heard – Dorothy and Rubinson had both done extensive interviews referring to me in unpleasant fashion (as justification for their coup, I imagine). I asked for $300 and got it. I've written elsewhere to you that Sundazed took out all references they found controversial, including one about Bill Graham."

== Reception and legacy ==
Professional ratings
Review scores
Source	Rating
AllMusic	4.5/5 stars
Mojo	4/5 stars
Pitchfork	8.9/10
Record Collector	4/5 stars
Uncut	5/5 stars

The United States of America was originally released to minimal press. In his 1968 Rolling Stone review, Barret Hansen wrote that "the tunes are infectious, the harmonies adventurous yet eminently satisfying. And the lyrics (which Columbia has wisely printed on the jacket) are the best thing of all". He nonetheless found that the album "falls short of being really satisfying" due to the band's musicianship being "not quite on a level with their ideas", noting: "The voices are flat and uninteresting, showing little technical or interpretive power. The instruments perform their assigned tasks adroitly, but all too mechanically." In the Rock Encyclopedia by Lillian Roxon, published in 1969, shortly after the group's break-up, the band was described as "apparently too good to last, or before its time, or the victim of one or another dreaded rock-group disease", and noted that the album itself had met a "mixed reception", with "unbelieving enthusiasm on one hand, and boredom on the other". According to Moskowitz, "people thought us snooty, loud and obnoxious".

Retrospective reception of the album has been very positive. Richie Unterberger of AllMusic deemed it "one of the most exciting and experimental psychedelic albums of the late 1960s" and compared some of the band's more hard-edged material to early Pink Floyd and the Velvet Underground. He concluded: "Occasionally things get too excessive and self-conscious, and the attempts at comedy are a bit flat, but otherwise this is a near classic." "The most ambitious, idiosyncratic debut album of 2004 is 36 years old," opened Mark Hamilton's review of the 2004 reissue for Dusted Magazine. Pitchfork's Cameron Macdonald said that the album "still stands above the work of most of their Monterey-era, psych-rock peers", despite the presence of some dated electronic effects typical of "many electro-acoustic pieces from the analog years." It was later listed by Pitchfork as the 129th best album of the 1960s. It is included in the book 1001 Albums You Must Hear Before You Die. Spin included it in a list of the "Top 100 Alternative Albums of the 1960s", labelling it as "a concept album in the most accurate sense of the term: a radical psychedelic critique of American society that builds to a finale which synthesizes everything that came before". Classic Rock cited it as one of the "16 Best Psychedelic Rock Albums" in 2018. In a retrospective article on rock music in the year 1968, Record Collector described it as "[unveiling] electronic rock in a blisteringly audacious comment on America today".

In a 2003 interview, Moskowitz commented on revisiting the album; "It wasn't half bad. Some of it was embarrassing but some of it really stood up over time." She said that her favourite track was "Where Is Yesterday", and that if the group had recorded a second album, that they should have continued in the musical direction of the track.

== Track listing ==
All tracks are written by Joseph Byrd and Dorothy Moskowitz, except where noted.

Side one
No.	Title	Writer(s)	Length
1.	"The American Metaphysical Circus"	Byrd	4:55
2.	"Hard Coming Love"		4:43
3.	"Cloud Song"	A. A. Milne	3:18
4.	"The Garden of Earthly Delights"		2:39
5.	"I Won't Leave My Wooden Wife for You, Sugar"		3:52

Side two
No.	Title	Writer(s)	Length
6.	"Where Is Yesterday"	Gordon Marron, Ed Bogas, Moskowitz	3:07
7.	"Coming Down"		2:40
8.	"Love Song for the Dead Ché"	Byrd	3:25
9.	"Stranded in Time"	Marron, Bogas	1:50
10.	"The American Way of Love": I. "Metaphor for an Older Man" (Byrd); II. "California Good-Time Music" (Byrd); III. "Love Is All" (Byrd, Moskowitz, Rand Forbes, Craig Woodson, Marron)"		6:38
Total length:			37:07

1992 reissue bonus tracks
No.	Title	Writer(s)	Length
11.	"Osamu's Birthday"	Byrd	2:59
12.	"No Love to Give"	Moskowitz	2:36

2004 reissue bonus tracks
No.	Title	Writer(s)	Length
11.	"Osamu's Birthday"	Byrd	2:59
12.	"No Love to Give"	Moskowitz	2:36
13.	"I Won't Leave My Wooden Wife for You, Sugar"		3:45
14.	"You Can Never Come Down"	Byrd	2:32
15.	"Perry Pier"	Moskowitz	2:37
16.	"Tailor Man"	Moskowitz	3:06
17.	"Do You Follow Me"	Kenneth Edwards	2:34
18.	"The American Metaphysical Circus"	Byrd	4:01
19.	"Mouse (The Garden of Earthly Delights)"		2:39
20.	"Heresy (Coming Down)"		2:32

== Personnel ==
The United States of America

- Joseph Byrd – electronic music, electric harpsichord, organ, calliope, piano, vocals
- Dorothy Moskowitz – lead vocals
- Gordon Marron – electric violin, ring modulator, vocals (on "Where Is Yesterday" and "Stranded in Time")
- Rand Forbes – fretless bass guitar
- Craig Woodson – electric drums, percussion

Additional musicians

- Ed Bogas – occasional organ, piano, calliope
- Don Ellis – trumpet (on "I Won't Leave My Wooden Wife for You, Sugar")

For 2004 reissue

Personnel for tracks 1 to 12 as per original issue/1992 reissue. For tracks 13 to 20:

- Dorothy Moskowitz – lead vocals
- Joseph Byrd – electronic music, electric harpsichord, organ, calliope, piano, vocals ("I Won't Leave My Wooden Wife for You, Sugar", "You Can Never Come Down", "The American Metaphysical Circus", "Mouse (The Garden of Earthly Delights)", "Heresy (Coming Down)")
- Gordon Marron – electric violin, ring modulator ("I Won't Leave My Wooden Wife for You, Sugar" & "You Can Never Come Down")
- Rand Forbes – fretless bass guitar ("I Won't Leave My Wooden Wife for You, Sugar" & "You Can Never Come Down")
- Craig Woodson – electric drums, percussion ("I Won't Leave My Wooden Wife for You, Sugar", "You Can Never Come Down")
- Jeff Marinell – guitar ("Perry Pier", "Tailor Man", "Do You Follow Me")
- Richard Grayson – keyboards ("Perry Pier", "Tailor Man", "Do You Follow Me")
- Carmie Simon – bass guitar ("Perry Pier", "Tailor Man", "Do You Follow Me")
- Dennis Woods – drums ("Perry Pier", "Tailor Man", "Do You Follow Me")
- Mike Agnello – organ ("The American Metaphysical Circus", "Mouse (The Garden of Earthly Delights)", "Heresy (Coming Down)")
- Stu Brother – bass guitar ("The American Metaphysical Circus", "Mouse (The Garden of Earthly Delights)", "Heresy (Coming Down)")

Technical staff

- Glen Kolotkin – remixing
- Arthur Kendy – remixing
- Richard Durrett – instrument design engineering
- David Diller – engineering
- David Rubinson – production

== Charts ==
Chart (1968)	Peak position
US Billboard 200	181

== Release history ==
Region	Date	Label	Format	Catalog
United Kingdom	1968	CBS	LP	63340
United States	1968	Columbia	LP	CS 9614
United Kingdom	December 9, 1997	Edsel	CD	EGCD 541
United States	June 29, 2004	Sundazed	CD	SC 11124
United States	February 19, 2008	Sundazed	LP	LP 5211
United States	November 23, 2017	Sundazed	LP	5538

== Notes ==
=== References ===
- Holm-Hudson, Kevin (2002). Progressive Rock Reconsidered. Taylor & Francis. ISBN 0-8153-3714-0.
