= Jazz (Ry Cooder album) =

Studio album by Ry Cooder
- Released: 1978
- Recorded: Amigo, North Hollywood
- Genre: Trad jazz, dixieland, ragtime
- Length: 37:50
- Label: Warner Bros. BSK 3197
- Producer: Joseph Byrd, Ry Cooder

Ry Cooder chronology
Show Time (1977)	Jazz (1978)	Bop till You Drop (1979)

Jazz is an album by the American musician and songwriter Ry Cooder, released in 1978 by Warner Bros. Records. The album was produced by Cooder and Joseph Byrd and was Cooder's seventh.

== Critical reception ==
Professional ratings
Review scores
Source	Rating
AllMusic	3/5 stars
Christgau's Record Guide	C+
The Rolling Stone Album Guide	2.5/5 stars

The Globe and Mail noted that "the record's worth, outside of the precise, calculated playing by a collection of jazz scholar-musicians, lies in the revelation of one or two little-known jazz figures, especially a Bahamian guitarist named Joseph Spence, whose up-tempo, syncopated treatment of religious hymns must have shocked the pious."

== Track listing ==
LP side A

1. "Big Bad Bill (Is Sweet William Now)" (Milton Ager, Jack Yellen) – 3:34
2. "Face to Face That I Shall Meet Him" (Traditional; adapted by Joseph Spence) – 3:16
3. "The Pearls / Tia Juana" (Jelly Roll Morton; adapted by Ry Cooder) – 4:18
4. "The Dream" (Jack the Bear, Jess Pickett) – 5:03
5. "Happy Meeting in Glory" (Traditional; adapted by Joseph Spence) – 3:13

LP side B

1. "In a Mist" (Bix Beiderbecke) – 2:05
2. "Flashes" (Bix Beiderbecke) – 2:17
3. "Davenport Blues" (Bix Beiderbecke) – 2:01
4. "Shine" (Cecil Mack, Ford Dabney) – 3:43
5. "Nobody" (Bert Williams) – 5:07
6. "We Shall Be Happy" (Traditional; adapted by Joseph Spence) – 3:13

== Charts ==
Year	Chart	Peak
1978	Australia (Kent Music Report)	68

== Personnel ==
The album has several songs featuring former members of famous vocal groups: Willie (Bill) Johnson (a founder of the 1934 group Golden Gate Quartet, Jubilaires, Jubilee Four), Clifford Givens (Southern Sons, Golden Gate Quartet, various Inkspots, Melody Masters), Pico Payne (Inkspots, Platters, Drifters, Melody Masters), Jimmy Adams (various Inkspots, Jubilaires, Jubilee Four.)

- Ry Cooder – guitar, Dobro, vocals, mandolin, tiple, harp
- Mark Stevens – drums (A1, A2, A4, A5, B4, B6)
- Harvey Pittel – alto saxophone, clarinet (A1, B1, B3, B4)
- Tom Collier – marimba, vibraphone (A4, B1, B3, B4)
- George Bohanon – baritone horn (A2, A5, B6)
- Oscar Brashear – cornet (A2, A5, B6)
- Stuart Brotman – cimbalom (A2, A5, B6)
- Red Callender – tuba (A2, A5, B6)
- David Lindley – mandobanjo, mandolin (A2, A5, B6)
- Barbara Starkey – pump organ (A2, A5, B6)
- David Sherr – bass clarinet (B1, B3, B4)
- John Rodby – piano (A1, B4)
- Tom Pedrini – bass (B1, B3)
- Jimmy Adams – backing vocals (B4, B5)
- Cliff Givens – backing vocals (B4, B5)
- Bill Johnson – backing vocals (B4, B5)
- Simon Pico Payne – backing vocals (B4, B5)
- Randy Aldcroft – trombone (A1)
- Pat Rizzo – alto saxophone (A1)
- Mario Guarneri – cornet (A1)
- Bill Hood – bass saxophone (A1)
- Chuck Domanico – bass (A4)
- Earl Hines – piano (A4)
- Chuck Berghofer – bass (B4)
- Willie Schwartz – clarinet (B4)
