= Richard Grayson (composer) =

American classical composer

Richard Grayson (March 25, 1941 – July 3, 2016) was an American composer and pianist.

== Biography ==
Richard Grayson was born in New York on March 25, 1941. He received his PhD in composition from UCLA in 1969—only the third person to receive a UCLA music Ph.D., after Michael Zearott and Edward Applebaum—and in the same year joined the music faculty of Occidental College, where he taught until his retirement in 2001. His 32 years of annual keyboard improvisation concerts, in which he improvised based on audience requests, were a highlight of that college's concert season. He is also a composer of instrumental and vocal music as well as of live electronic music. His awards include a Fulbright Scholarship to study in 1965–66 with Henri Pousseur in Brussels and at the Cologne Courses for New Music, and a composition grant from the National Endowment for the Arts. From fall 2001 until June 2016 he taught music theory courses at the Crossroads School in Santa Monica.

For over three decades Grayson has given concerts and seminars for the Yamaha Music Education Foundation and has visited Japan many times to perform and teach. For the past ten summers he has taught improvisation courses at the Showa Academy of Music in Kawasaki, Japan, and was also invited to give seminars and performances at conservatories in Taiwan, China, and Vietnam. He has been a featured performer at several US national piano pedagogy conferences and was twice invited to give master classes in improvisation at the Oficina de Música Festival in Curitiba, Brazil.

His performance credits include six recordings of contemporary music on which he is featured as pianist, and four which include his compositions. For many years he was on the board of the Monday Evening concerts at the Los Angeles County Museum of Art, and frequently performed on that series. Three of Grayson's electronic keyboard works were performed at an historic University of Massachusetts, Lowell concert featuring the re-creation of George Antheil's complete Ballet Mécanique. Two of these pieces, Mr. 528 and Shoot the Piano Player have been issued on CD by the Electronic Music Foundation in New York. In September 2001 he gave a solo concert of his improvisation and visual-electronic compositions at the Los Angeles County Museum of Art. Grayson was also a church organist for 35 years, most recently at St. Martin of Tours in West Los Angeles, from which he retired in 2009.

Grayson died on July 3, 2016, at age 75.

== Compositions (selective list) ==
- Anybody's Guess, for multiple electronic keyboards
- Aurore, for flute, clarinet, harp, piano, violin, and cello
- Fantasy on Broadway Boogie Woogie, electronic music with video
- Homage to J.S. Bach, for harpsichord, with tape delay
- Listen for the Bell, electronic music with video
- Meadow Music, for solo piano
- Mr. 528, for three disklaviers and three clavinovas (1996)
- Off Broadway, electronic music with video
- Ostinato, for two synthesizers and a sequencer
- Promenade, for two amplified accordions
- Rain, for piano, ring modulator, and tape delay
- Rocky Road Ripple, electronic music with video
- Shoot the Piano Player, computer-controlled pianos (1995)
