= Rock Machine I Love You =

Rock Machine - I Love You

Compilation album by Various artists
- Released: 1968
- Genre: Rock
- Label: CBS

Various artists chronology
The Rock Machine Turns You On (1968)	Rock Machine - I Love You (1968)	Fill Your Head with Rock (1970)

Rock Machine - I Love You was a bargain-priced sampler album, released by CBS Records in the UK in 1968.

It followed its equally successful predecessor, The Rock Machine Turns You On. Rock Machine - I Love You entered the UK Albums Chart in June 1969, several months after its first release, rising to no. 15, and was estimated to have sold over 90,000 copies.

CBS followed it up again in 1970 with two double sampler albums - Fill Your Head with Rock and Rockbuster.

== Track listing ==
=== Side 1 ===
1. "More and More" - Blood, Sweat & Tears - from the LP Blood Sweat & Tears
2. "Stoned Soul Picnic" - Laura Nyro - from the LP Eli and the Thirteenth Confession
3. "Stop" - Mike Bloomfield & Al Kooper - from the LP Super Session
4. "You Ain't Goin' Nowhere" - The Byrds - from the LP Sweetheart of the Rodeo
5. "Somebody to Love" - Grace Slick and The Great Society - from the LP Conspicuous Only in its Absence
6. "Brandenburg Concerto No 3 in G Major", 2nd movement - Wendy Carlos - from the LP Switched-On Bach
7. "Hey, That's No Way to Say Goodbye" - Leonard Cohen - from the LP The Songs of Leonard Cohen

=== Side 2 ===
1. "America" - Simon & Garfunkel - from the LP Bookends
2. "My Name is Jack" - John Simon - from the Original Soundtrack recording You Are What You Eat
3. "See To Your Neighbour" - The Electric Flag - from the LP The Electric Flag
4. "The Tihai", excerpt - Don Ellis and his Orchestra - from the LP Shock Treatment
5. "Turtle Blues" - Big Brother and the Holding Company - from the LP Cheap Thrills (listed on the cover/record as "Ball and Chain")
6. "Time" - Dino Valente - from the LP Dino Valente
7. "Ain't That a Lot of Love" - Taj Mahal - from the LP The Natch'l Blues
