= Joseph Byrd =

American musician and songwriter (1937–2025)

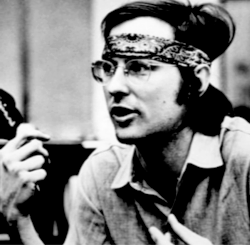
- Byrd, c.1968

Background information
- Born: Joseph Hunter Byrd Jr. December 19, 1937; Louisville, Kentucky, U.S.
- Died: November 2, 2025 (aged 87) Medford, Oregon, U.S.
- Genres: Psychedelic rock; experimental music; postmodern music; minimal music · parlour music · electronic music; avant-garde
- Occupations: Composer; arranger; producer; vocalist; educator
- Instruments: Piano; organ; synthesizer; calliope; harp; vocals
- Years active: Late 1950s–2025
- Formerly of: The United States of America

Joseph Hunter Byrd Jr. (December 19, 1937 – November 2, 2025) was an American composer, musician and academic. After first becoming known as an experimental composer in New York City and Los Angeles, he became the leader of the psychedelic rock band The United States of America, an innovative but short-lived band which integrated psychedelic rock, electronic sound, and radical political ideas into rock music. In 1968 he recorded the album The American Metaphysical Circus, credited to Joe Byrd and the Field Hippies. After working as a record producer, arranger, and soundtrack composer, he became a university teacher in music history and theory.

== Early life and career ==
Byrd was born in Louisville, Kentucky, and was raised in Tucson, Arizona, after his father purchased a mine near the Mexican border. His sister, Elizabeth would become a notable writer. As a teenager, Byrd played accordion and vibraphone in a series of pop and country bands, started writing his own arrangements, and performed on some local TV shows. He formed his first jazz quartet while a student at the University of Arizona, where he studied composition with Barney Childs (B.M., 1959). He began his graduate studies in composition on a Sollnit Fellowship at Stanford University, where he first met La Monte Young, then a graduate student at the nearby University of California, Berkeley, as well as Terry Riley and Steve Reich.

== New York, 1960–63 ==
After receiving his M.A. from Stanford in 1960, he relocated to New York City to study with avant garde composers Morton Feldman and John Cage; according to Byrd, he became Cage's last student. Byrd became a part of the proto-Fluxus experiments that were emerging at that time in conjunction with Young, Charlotte Moorman (Byrd's girlfriend at one point), Yoko Ono, Jackson Mac Low (he participated in An Anthology of Chance Operations), and others. Byrd took an eclectic approach in his compositions. He continued to work with La Monte Young, who organised the first concert of Byrd's music in Yoko Ono's loft in March 1961. Byrd said:

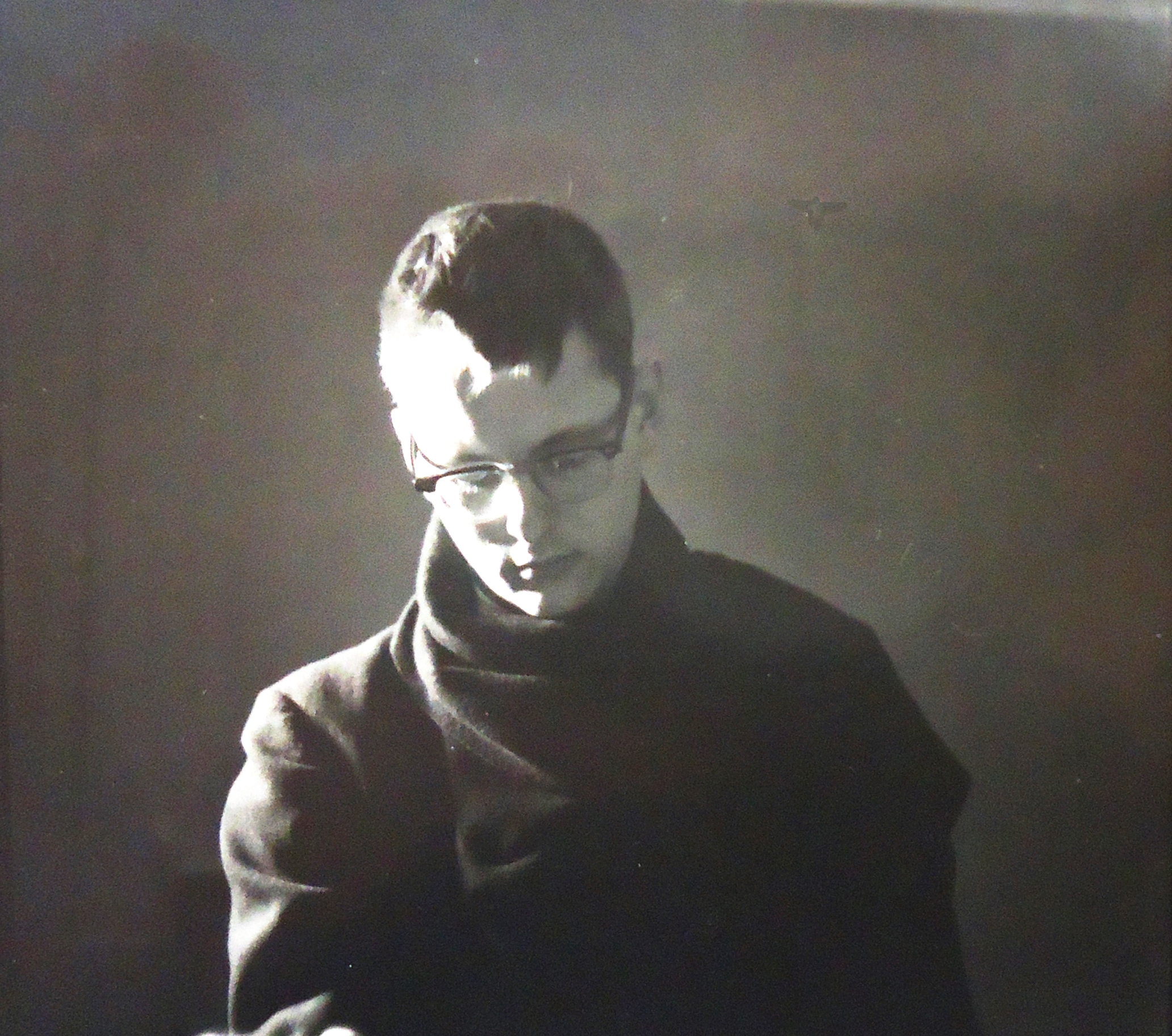
Joseph Hunter Byrd Jr., American composer, c. 1961, New York

In New York, we were all subsumed into a protean energy - less a school of composition than an attitude: we were redefining art itself... My time in NY was central to my development.... Cage's influence had spread from music to dance and finally to a kind of art that had no name, and was produced by artists of every kind... These events were called "happenings."... I wrote and performed some music, and developed a rapport with a group of poets who had come under Cage's influence. I studied electronic music with Richard Maxfield at The New School. Mostly though, I looked and listened and marveled. Unlike many of Cage's disciples who had the money to pursue their art... I had to work full time to survive.

While in New York, Byrd worked between 1961 and 1963 as an assistant to composer and music critic Virgil Thomson. He continued composing, and earned some international interest for his use of vocal and instrumental sound in early minimal music compositions. Byrd's 1962 Carnegie Hall recital was reviewed in prominent publications including The New York Times, which described the concert as a "thimbleful of tiny sounds" that were "generally just this side of the threshold of inaudibility." Recordings of Byrd's early-1960s compositions, performed by the American Contemporary Music Ensemble (including pianist Timothy Andres, violinists Caroline Shaw and Caleb Burhans, and violist Nadia Sirota), were released by New World Records in 2013. They include Animals (written for prepared piano and other instruments), Loops & Sequences (written for Charlotte Moorman to perform on cello), Four Sound*Poems (verses written by Byrd and dedicated to four experimental women artists), Water Music (commissioned by and dedicated to percussionist Max Neuhaus), and Prelude to 'The Mystery Cheese-Ball', a piece originally performed by Byrd in 1961 with Young, Mac Low, Ono, David Tudor, and Diane Wakoski. The liner notes by Eric Smigel state:

Crafted with technical precision, all of the works were designed to explore the "singularity of sound" that was central to Byrd's lessons with Feldman. Byrd remains sensitive to the vertical qualities of any given pitch collection, but rather than presenting static drones or sequences of isolated chords, he frequently animates the relationship among the materials through indeterminate procedures and shifting cycles.... In other words, he mobilizes the rhythmic arrangements of the independent components, which creates a sophisticated brand of variable polyphony, similar to the ever-changing spatial arrangements of a Calder mobile.

Virgil Thomson recommended Byrd to Time-Life Records as an arranger on a project to record music from the Civil War. There, he met Dorothy Moskowitz, a recent graduate of Barnard College, and they established a personal relationship. Byrd started work as a staff arranger and producer for Capitol Records, which worked on projects for Time-Life, and he and Moskowitz worked together on arrangements for The Life Treasury Of Christmas Music, released as an LP in 1963.

== Los Angeles, 1963–68 ==
Late in 1963, Byrd returned to the West Coast with Moskowitz. He enrolled in the musicology doctoral program at UCLA and studied music history, acoustics, psychology of music, and Indian music. He developed radical political views, and joined the Communist Party. At UCLA he formed the New Music Workshop with jazz trumpeter Don Ellis and others, where the first West Coast experiments in what would come to be called "performance art" and "concept art" would develop. On one occasion in 1965, as the concluding part of a series of concerts and events called "Steamed Spring Vegetable Pie" (a title taken at random from The Alice B. Toklas Cookbook), Byrd organized a blues band fronted by his friend Linda Ronstadt, to play during a "happening". Byrd said that "the realization that rock was an access to a larger public came out of that concert, and the idea of forming a band began taking shape."

In the mid-1960s, he also wrote for the Los Angeles Free Press, lectured at the Pasadena Art Museum and elsewhere, and wrote the liner notes for John Cage's LP of Variations IV. With Barbara Haskell he co-produced the first West Coast festival of experimental arts, before leaving UCLA in the summer of 1966 to create music full-time and produce "happenings".

=== The United States of America ===
Moskowitz returned to New York in 1966, but she and Byrd stayed in contact. In early 1967, Byrd approached Art Kunkin of the LA Free Press for financial help so he could start a rock group. Byrd stated that his aesthetic aims were to form "an avant-garde political/musical rock group with the idea of combining electronic sound (not electronic music)... musical/political radicalism... [and] performance art".

When Moskowitz returned to California, she and Byrd started the United States of America, with another politically radical composer, Michael Agnello. Earlier collaborations had introduced Byrd to Tom Oberheim, who built ring modulators and other devices for them. Recruiting bassist Rand Forbes, electric violinist Gordon Marron, keyboardist Ed Bogas, and drummer Craig Woodson (another member of the New Music Workshop), the band undertook their first live performances in late 1967, at the Ash Grove in Los Angeles. Byrd was influenced by groups like The Red Crayola, Country Joe and the Fish, and Blue Cheer, and by the music of maverick American composer Charles Ives, particularly the melody "Columbia, the Gem of the Ocean" often referenced by Ives. Electronic devices were used live as well as on the band's recordings, to process other instruments and Moskowitz's voice as well as providing their own musical textures, and the lyrics written by Byrd for some of the songs were markedly political. After Agnello's departure, the group's self-titled LP, produced by David Rubinson—who had previously worked with Byrd and Moskowitz in New York—was recorded for Columbia Records.

The United States of America LP was released in early 1968, but failed to find much commercial success on its original release. The band toured the U.S. East Coast, followed by a number of performances in the Southwest U.S., with mixed success, including shows with The Troggs, The Velvet Underground and at Bill Graham's Fillmore East. However, the group rapidly fell apart over creative and other differences as well as what Byrd saw as a lack of record company support. There was disagreement between Byrd, Marron and Bogas over musical direction, with Marron's promotion of lighter material conflicting with Byrd's vision for the band. There were also tensions between Byrd, Moskowitz and Rubinson, with Byrd claiming that Rubinson forced him out in order to promote Moskowitz as a solo artist; for his part, Rubinson described Byrd as a "control freak... a very, very difficult person to deal with." Byrd subsequently commented: "The idea was to create a radical experience. It didn't succeed. For one thing, I had assembled too many personalities; every rehearsal became group therapy. A band that wants to succeed needs a single, mutually acceptable identity. I tried to do it democratically, and it was not successful."

The album was later described by rock critic Richie Unterberger as "a near classic", "a tour de force (though not without its flaws) of experimental rock that blended surprisingly melodic sensibilities with unnerving blasts of primitive synthesizers and lyrics that could range from misty romanticism to hard-edged irony. For the relatively few who heard it, the record was a signpost to the future with its collision of rock and classical elements, although the material crackled with a tension that reflected the United States of America itself in the late '60s." Though the album had limited success in the US, it was more highly regarded in the UK and Europe, where it has been cited in recent years as a groundbreaking and influential recording, and has seen at least three re-releases since 1992.

=== The American Metaphysical Circus ===
Byrd then received the support of John McClure, head of Columbia's Masterworks classical music division, to record a second album. He recorded The American Metaphysical Circus, credited to Joe Byrd and the Field Hippies, later in 1968. The album again made use of synthesizers and vocoder, along with an extended group of West Coast studio musicians including Tom Scott, guitarist Ted Greene, and uncredited bassist Harvey Newmark. According to Byrd, the whole album was written and recorded within a few weeks, apart from one song, "You Can't Ever Come Down", originally written for the United States of America. He said: "It was a real chaotic time... frantic.... The songs had to be churned out, and ultimately there was not enough material.... Columbia decided that no rock musician could be called Joseph, and told me they were going to call it Joe Byrd and…. The musicians had been close during the traumatic sessions, and Ted Greene, pointing out that we were really not city hippies, called us The Field Hippies, so I used that name. By then I was exhausted fighting for stuff."

The extensive use of effects, delays, echoes, backwards vocals and other recording tricks and techniques are reminiscent of some of the experiments and work carried out by George Martin as well as Pink Floyd. The album is most noted for "The Sub-Sylvian Litanies", a three-part suite which has been described as "an entire acid trip in 11 minutes." Other album highlights include the equally psychedelic "The Elephant at the Door", and the politically charged "Invisible Man", written for and aimed at President Lyndon B. Johnson. Two of the more unusual tracks on the record are "Mister Fourth of July"—a ragtime tune complete with scratchy 78 RPM-style effects—and "Leisure World", featuring narration from long-time ABC voice-over and "Ghoulardi" originator Ernie Anderson in an ode to California's first retirement mega-community. Released in 1969, the record achieved a cult following in the US, and remained in the Columbia Masterworks catalog for some twenty years. Byrd estimated in 2002, in conjunction with a filing in the Napster music copyright case, that likely over 100,000 copies of The American Metaphysical Circus had been sold, yet he had never received a penny of royalties from Columbia/CBS/Sony.

== Other work in the 1960s and 1970s ==
While working with the United States of America in 1967, Byrd provided an arrangement and electronic music for "Crucifixion" on Phil Ochs' album Pleasures of the Harbor. The song was taken to be a comment on the assassination of President Kennedy, but the version on the album, according to Unterberger, set Ochs' vocal against "an eerie morass of loops, electric harpsichord, and washes of electronic distortion, arranged by Joseph Byrd... [This] made him sound for all the world like a lone voice drowning in an avant-garde thunderstorm, which in the eyes of many fans obscured the terrible beauty of the song." Another critic, Mark Brend, describes the track as "one of the great audacious gestures of 1960s rock." Byrd also arranged two tracks on the 1968 album by folk group The Limeliters, Time To Gather Seeds.

In the early 1970s, Byrd taught at California State University, Fullerton, where he introduced one of the first courses in American music (offered as part of the American Studies curriculum). He also researched the history of American popular music and, in 1974, founded the Yankee Doodle Society with Clare Spark, to research, promote and perform popular music of the mid-19th century American middle class. In 1975, Byrd was approached by Jon Monday at Takoma Records to make a record of synthesized Christmas carols, A Christmas Yet to Come (Takoma C-1046), and in 1976, Yankee Transcendoodle (Takoma C-1051), an LP of synthesized patriotic music in conjunction with the United States Bicentennial. The albums were co-produced by Jon Monday and Byrd. On the albums, Byrd worked with Don Buchla, and synthesizers again made by Tom Oberheim. The albums were followed by a third Takoma LP Sentimental Songs of the Mid-19th Century, by the American Music Consort, co-produced by Clare Spark and Jon Monday (Joseph Byrd, Director - Takoma A-1048 - 1976), and the 6-sided LP set Popular Music In Jacksonian America (Musical Heritage Society MHS834651 - 1982).

Byrd arranged and produced Ry Cooder's critically acclaimed 1978 album Jazz, on which Cooder "pays homage to some of the early tunes and masters of jazz, ranging from the late 1800s through the 'coon songs' of the early part of the next century, to the ragtime and 'Spanish' music of Jelly Roll Morton, and the sophistication of cornetist Bix Beiderbecke."

He scored a number of films, including Agnès Varda's 1969 Lions Love, Bruce Clark's 1971 The Ski Bum with Charlotte Rampling and Zalman King, The Ghost Dance (1980) and Robert Altman's ill-fated H.E.A.L.T.H., which was originally shot in 1979, but had its U.S. release delayed until 1982 because of a shakeup in the management of 20th Century Fox.

Byrd also wrote commercially for advertising and television, including a theme for the CBS Evening News, developed sounds used in Mattel toys, and created the electronic/modified voice sound effects for the drones in Douglas Trumbull's Silent Running (which may have been the inspiration for the "voice" of R2-D2 in the first Star Wars film).

== Later work ==
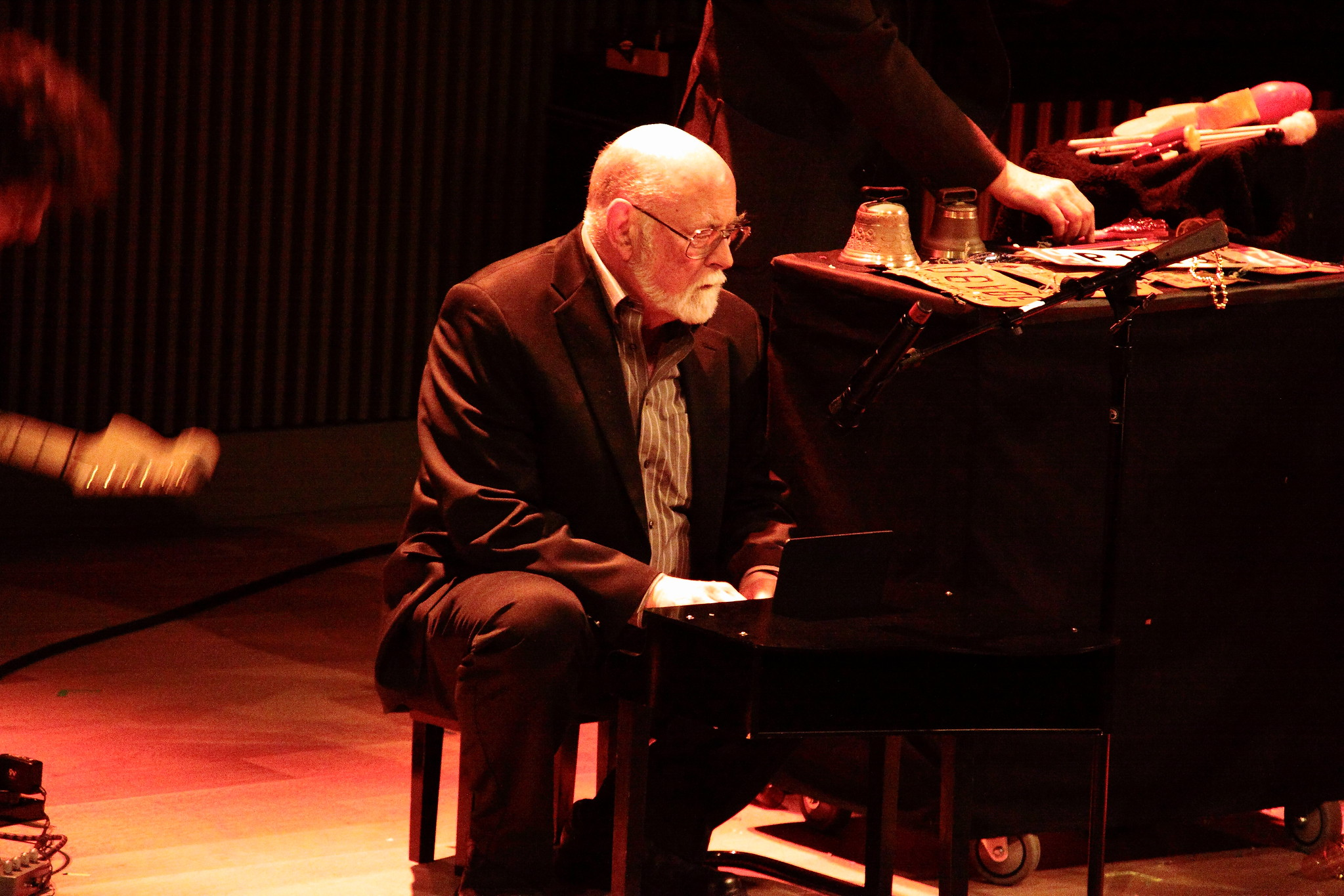
Joseph Byrd playing toy piano at Other Minds Festival 19 in San Francisco

In 1986, Byrd moved to northern California, where he formed a klezmer group, the Jewish Wedding Band, later renamed Catskills Revival. He researched the history of Jewish music in America, locating and performing forgotten pieces from stage shows and films. The band released two albums, Songs of Love and Chutzpah (1997), and A Child's Hanukkah (1998). In the 1990s, he also launched LogoMusic, developing musical signatures and other sound material for corporate websites.

In 2006, Byrd collaborated with the Norwegian improvisation group Spunk and UK sound art unit Dreams of Tall Buildings. For White Elephant, a collaboration between these three parties, he created a graphic score as "a kind of 'space opera' - in the form of an imaginary space mission outside our galaxy in the year 9050. Photographs from NASA's Hubble Space Telescope are the basis for the score, consisting of a mixture of listed, sampled and improvised sounds in parallel to an electronic soundtrack created by Dreams of Tall Buildings." White Elephant was premiered at Sonic Arts Network's Expo festival in Manchester, England, on June 24, 2006.

Byrd began teaching music history and theory at the College of the Redwoods in Eureka in 2000. He was for five years a food columnist for the North Coast Journal in Humboldt County, California.

== Death ==
Byrd died in Medford, Oregon, on November 2, 2025, at the age of 87.
