= Glenn Schwartz =

- Born: March 20, 1940; Cleveland, Ohio, U.S.
- Died: November 2, 2018 (aged 78)
- Genres: Rock, blues rock, R&B
- Occupations: Singer, songwriter
- Instrument: Guitar
- Label: Columbia,

Glenn W. Schwartz (March 20, 1940 – November 2, 2018) was an American guitarist who first came to the attention of rock music audiences as the original guitar player of the James Gang, based in Cleveland, Ohio.

== Career ==
Schwartz left James Gang in late December 1967 when he moved to California. He later joined the Los Angeles-based blues band Pacific Gas & Electric and, in 1970, scored a national top 20 hit with the song "Are You Ready?".

Tired of the rock and roll lifestyle, he left PG&E to join a pioneering Gospel rock group All Saved Freak Band, which was the musical evangelistic arm of an Ohio religious group-turned-cult, the Church of the Risen Christ, headed by Larry Hill. Schwartz's life in this cult with Rev. Larry Hill is explored in the book, Fortney Road: Life, Death, and Deception in a Christian Cult by Jeff C. Stevenson (2015). All told, Schwartz recorded four albums with the Freak Band before leaving it in 1980.

Through the 1990s and 2000s, Schwartz played weekly blues gigs every Thursday at Major Hoopples just outside Cleveland's The Flats neighborhood, often with his brother Gene playing bass. Changes at venues and increasing health issues kept him from playing live for a few years after 2010, but Schwartz returned to the stage for a 75th birthday show and an impromptu jam at Coachella Valley Music and Arts Festival with Joe Walsh and The Arcs, featuring Dan Auerbach of The Black Keys. As of 2016, Schwartz had brought his celebrated guitar playing – and preacher-style stage presence – back to Cleveland bars regularly and has gone back into a Nashville studio with Auerbach.

== Christian conversion ==
While in Los Angeles on tour with the James Gang in 1967, Schwartz strolled onto the infamous Sunset Strip and stopped next to a small group of people listening to street preacher Arthur Blessitt, according to Stevenson's book. Some time later he professed conversion to Christianity, saying "I was finally blessed by mercy for I heard the Gospel of Christ."

Following his conversion, his zealous, new-found faith was not accepted well by the band, his family or his friends. As per Stevenson, Schwartz said: "I had some Christian friends who had some round stickers that read 'Real Peace Is in Jesus' and we stuck those all over our clothes ... We put some on Janis Joplin but she didn't like it and took them off. I remember she got pretty upset. At the time, the bikers [Hell's Angels] really liked my music and style of guitar playing because it was so out of control like they were. They didn't mind I talked about Jesus because they liked the music. But Janis was pretty rude and nasty to them and I know they didn't like Janis or her music".

== Death ==
Schwartz died on November 2, 2018, at the age of 78.

== Bibliography ==
- Rock 'n' Roll and the Cleveland Connection, Deanna R. Adams, Kent State University Press, 2002, pp. 72,73, 136, 138, 142–44, 172, 173, 416
