= The Rock Machine Turns You On =

Columbia/CBS 1968 compilation album by various artists

Compilation album by Various artists
- Released: 1968
- Genre: Rock
- Label: CBS SPR22

Various artists chronology
The Rock Machine Turns You On (1968)	Rock Machine I Love You (1968)

The Rock Machine Turns You On was the first bargain priced sampler album. It was released in the UK, Australia, New Zealand, Canada, South Africa, The Netherlands, Germany and a number of other European countries in 1968 as part of an international marketing campaign by CBS, the Columbia label then active in Europe, Australia, New Zealand and South Africa.

A 1969 edition (Number ASF 1356) bought in South Africa has a different sleeve (yellow with cut-outs in the Rock Machine boxes) and psychedelic multicoloured vinyl. It also has a completely different track list, significant tracks being Big Brother and the Holding Company's "Piece of my Heart" and Leonard Cohen's "Suzanne".

== Marketing campaign ==
The Rock Machine marketing campaign was initiated in the US in January 1968, by CBS's American parent, Columbia Records, under its president Clive Davis. The campaign was intended as a promotion for its expanding roster of rock and folk rock acts, who included Bob Dylan, The Byrds, Simon and Garfunkel, Leonard Cohen, Moby Grape, Spirit, Taj Mahal, and Blood, Sweat and Tears. Early promotional material in Billboard magazine stated:

"The Rock Machine...it's the happening sounds of today. Out of it comes the biggest, hottest rock list that ever started off any month. And with our Columbia Rock Machine, the most exciting and meaningful merchandising campaign we've ever devised..... It's all here - the talent, the product and the big concept to make it all happen. Now, doesn't that turn you on?"

The design of the "Rock Machine" logo, used in subsequent publicity material, including album covers, was by Milton Glaser.

== Sampler album ==
As part of its highly successful campaign, CBS Records released The Rock Machine Turns You On, the first budget sampler LP, in the UK in 1968. The album was priced at 14 shillings and 11 pence (£0.75), less than half the cost of a full priced LP at the time. It entered the UK Albums Chart in June 1969, several months after its first release, rising to no. 18, and was estimated to have sold over 140,000 copies.

The Rock Machine Turns You On influenced a generation of music fans. At the time, what was then called "underground music" was starting to achieve some commercial success in Europe, bolstered by new radio and TV programmes such as John Peel's Top Gear. CBS competed actively for this new market against other “progressive” labels such as Elektra, Island, Immediate, and the EMI subsidiary Harvest, who followed with similar samplers of their acts. Although some of the featured artists were already stars, others such as Leonard Cohen, Taj Mahal and Spirit were only starting to become known in Europe, and the album made a major contribution to their success.

== Follow-ups ==
CBS released a second, similar, sampler album in the UK in 1968, Rock Machine I Love You. The company followed up these LPs in 1970 with three double sampler albums - Fill Your Head with Rock, Rockbuster, and Together!.

Some years later, the affiliated company, Epic Records, used a similar format for The Rock Machine Still Turns You On, Vols. 1 and 2, in 1983.

A version of The Rock Machine Turns You On was issued on CD by Sony Records in 1996, but it lacked the Simon and Garfunkel track for licensing reasons.

== Track listing ==
=== Side 1 ===
1. "I'll Be Your Baby Tonight" - Bob Dylan - from the LP John Wesley Harding
2. "Can't Be So Bad" - Moby Grape - from the LP Wow
3. "Fresh Garbage" - Spirit - from the LP Spirit
4. "I Won't Leave My Wooden Wife For You, Sugar" - The United States of America - from the LP The United States of America
5. "Time of the Season" - The Zombies – from the LP Odessey and Oracle
6. "Turn on a Friend" – The Peanut Butter Conspiracy – from the LP The Great Conspiracy
7. "Sisters of Mercy" – Leonard Cohen – from the LP The Songs of Leonard Cohen

=== Side 2 ===
1. "My Days Are Numbered" – Blood, Sweat and Tears – from the LP Child Is Father to the Man
2. "Dolphins Smile" – The Byrds – from the LP The Notorious Byrd Brothers
3. "Scarborough Fair / Canticle" – Simon and Garfunkel – from the LP Parsley, Sage, Rosemary and Thyme
4. "Statesboro Blues" – Taj Mahal – from the LP Taj Mahal
5. "Killing Floor" – The Electric Flag – from the LP A Long Time Comin'
6. "Nobody’s Got Any Money In The Summer" – Roy Harper – from the LP Come Out Fighting Ghengis Smith
7. "Come Away Melinda" – Tim Rose – from the LP Tim Rose
8. "Flames" – Elmer Gantry's Velvet Opera – from the LP Elmer Gantry's Velvet Opera
