= Frank Cook (American musician) =

American drummer (1942–2021)

- Born: Frank Lenord Clayman Cook; January 6, 1942; Boyle Heights, Los Angeles, California, US
- Died: July 9, 2021 (aged 79) Marina del Rey, California, US
- Genres: Blues, blues rock, jazz
- Instrument: Drums

Frank Lenord Clayman Cook (January 6, 1942 – July 9, 2021) was an American drummer and member of blues bands Canned Heat, Pacific Gas & Electric and Bluesberry Jam. For a time he was also the manager of Pacific Gas & Electric.

== Life and career ==
He was born in Boyle Heights, Los Angeles, and raised in Brentwood, California. He attended University High School. Studying with Murray Spivack, he became a drummer in his mid-teens, before studying philosophy at UCLA.

Having a background in jazz, Frank Cook was an experienced musician who played with jazz musicians Charlie Haden, Chet Baker and Elmo Hope. He also had been in collaborations with soul artists such as Shirley Ellis and Dobie Gray. Cook became a member of Canned Heat when he replaced their drummer Ron Holmes. He then became Canned Heat's permanent drummer. He would stay with Canned Heat until being replaced by Fito de la Parra. Due to the position vacant in Bluesberry Jam, Cook then became their new drummer.

He later became a member of Pacific Gas & Electric. However, he had an interest in managing the band rather than being its drummer. For a time he actually did manage the group. A car accident ended his career as the drummer for Pacific Gas & Electric and he was replaced by Ron Woods. At the time of Pacific Gas & Electric's involvement in Lawrence Schiller's Lexington Experience film in 1970, Cook was still their manager. He transcribed the whole film in order to make out that the activities of the band relating to use of illegal substances were actually their lines if there would be any legal problems.

In later years Cook became a psychoanalyst in California, studying at the Southern California Psychoanalytic Institute and the Institute for Contemporary Psychoanalysis in Los Angeles. He served as president of the Southern California Psychoanalytic Society.

He died at home in Marina del Rey, California, on July 9, 2021.
