= B. B. King discography =

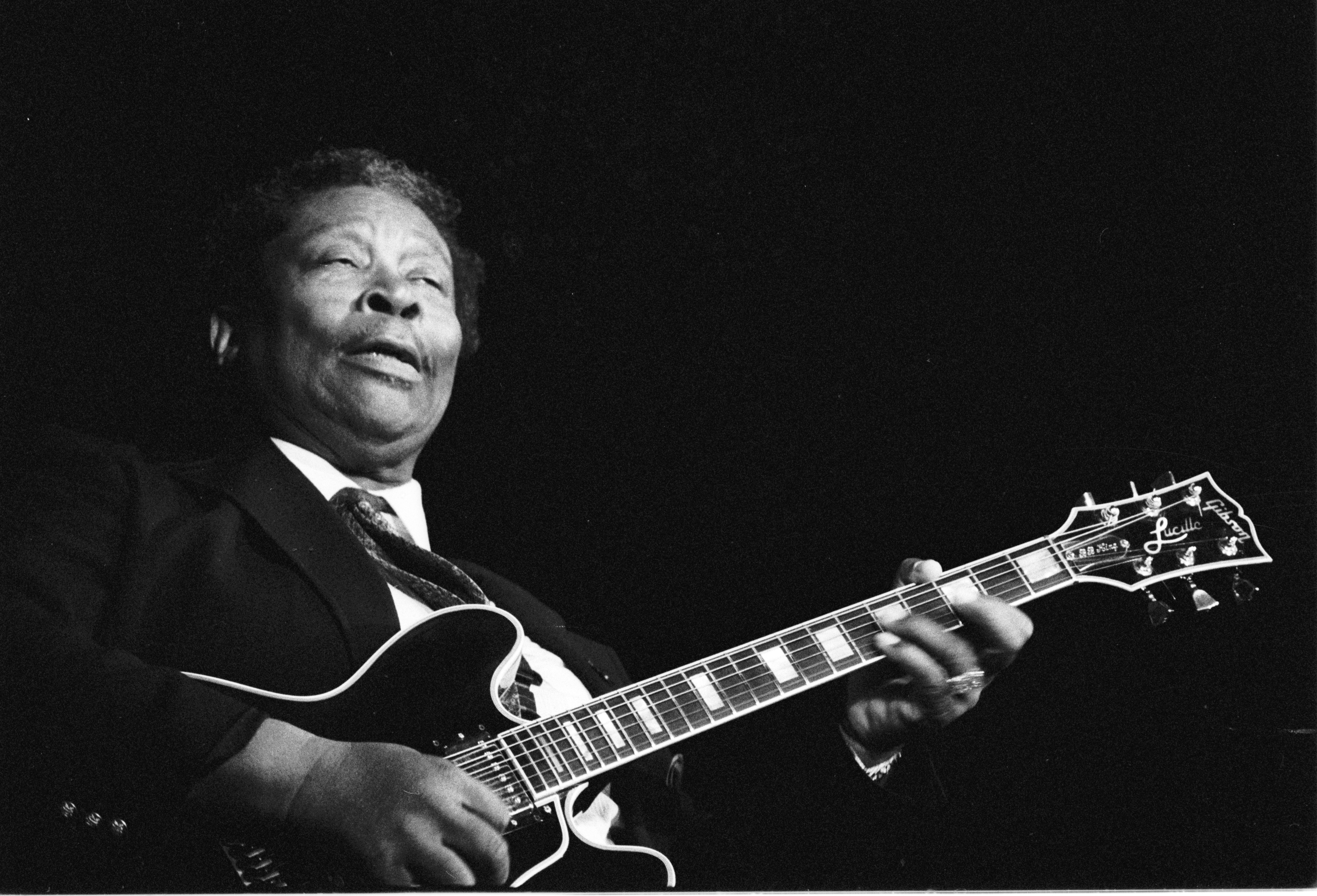
- In concert in France, 1989
- Studio albums: 43
- Live albums: 16
- Singles: 138

B. B. King (1925–2015) was an American blues musician whose recording career spanned 1949–2008. As with other blues contemporaries, King's material was primarily released on singles until the late 1950s–early 1960s, when long playing record albums became more popular.

== Overview ==
B.B. King's first charting single, "3 O'Clock Blues", reached No. 1 on the Billboard R&B charts in 1951. He charted further No. 1 singles on various Billboard R&B charts with "You Know I Love You", "Please Love Me" and "You Upset Me Baby". Between 1958 and 1974 he had 10 top 10 hits on the R&B chart, including "Sweet Sixteen", "Chains And Things", "I Like To Live the Love" and one of his most well-known hits, "The Thrill Is Gone". King had 32 charting singles on the Billboard Hot 100 from 1964 to 1989. His final chart entry on the Hot 100 was a 1989 collaboration with U2 on "When Love Comes To Town".

King charted 25 albums on the Billboard Blues Albums chart which ties him with Joe Bonamassa for the most charted albums. Between 1968 and 2008, he attained 33 charting albums on the Billboard 200. His highest-charting album was his 2000 album with Eric Clapton titled Riding With the King, peaking at No. 3.

== Studio albums ==
=== Modern Records (with Crown and Kent subsidiaries) ===
Year	Title	Chart peak						Certifications
Year	Title	US	US R&B	US Jazz	US Blues	AUS	SWI	Certifications
1956	Singin' the Blues This is the first album publication of titles only released before as 78 rpm or 45 rpm singles.: Released: 1956; Label: Crown (CLP-5020); Format: LP	—	—	—	—	—	—	RIAA: Gold
1958	The Blues This is the first album publication of titles only released before as 78 rpm or 45 rpm singles.: Released: 1958; Label: Crown (CLP-5063); Format: LP	—	—	—	—	—	—	
1959	B.B. King Wails: Released: 1959; Label: Crown (CLP-5115); Format: LP	—	—	—	—	—	—	
1959	Sings Spirituals: Released: 10 July 1960; Label: Crown (CLP-5119); Format: LP	—	—	—	—	—	—	
1960	The Great B. B. King: Released: 1960; Label: Crown (CLP–5153); Format: LP	—	—	—	—	—	—	
1960	King of the Blues: Released: 16 March 1960; Label: Crown (CLP-5167); Format: LP	—	—	—	—	—	—	
1960	My Kind of Blues: Released: August 1960; Label: Crown (CLP-5188); Format: LP	—	—	—	—	—	—	
1961	More B.B. King: Released: November 1961; Label: Crown (CLP-5230); Format: LP	—	—	—	—	—	—	
Notice - Although King had signed to ABC Records in January 1962, his former company Modern/RPM continued to release singles and albums until 1971. The recording dates are before 1962. The exception is a "contractual settlement" session recorded in 1965, which spawned six new recordings for Kent.
1962	Easy Listening Blues: Released: 1962; Label: Crown (CLP-5286); Format: LP	—	—	—	—	—	—	
1963	Blues in My Heart: Released: 1963; Label: Crown (CLP-5309); Format: LP	—	—	—	—	—	—	
1963	B.B. King: Released: 2 October 1963; Label: Crown (CLP-5359); Format: LP	—	—	—	—	—	—	
1963	"—" denotes releases that did not chart.							

=== ABC Records (and BluesWay subsidiary) then MCA Records and Geffen Records ===
Year	Title	Chart peak						Certifications
Year	Title	US	US R&B	US Jazz	US Blues	AUS	SWI	Certifications
1962	Mr. Blues: Released: Label: ABC-Paramount (ABC-456); Format: LP	—	—	—	—	—	—	
1966	Confessin' the Blues: Released: Label: ABC-Paramount (ABC-528); Format:	—	—	—	—	—	—	
1968	Blues on Top of Blues: Released: Label: ABC-Bluesway (BLS-6011); Format:	—	46	—	—	—	—	
1968	Lucille: Released: Label: ABC-Bluesway (BLS-6016); MCA (MCAD-10518); Format:	192	—	—	—	—	—	
1969	Live & Well (Side B): Released: Label: ABC-Bluesway (BLS-6031); MCA (MCAD-31191); Format:	56	11	17	—	—	—	
1969	Completely Well: Released: Label: ABC-Bluesway (BLS-6037); MCA (MCAD-11768); Format:	38	5	—	—	—	—	
1970	Indianola Mississippi Seeds: Released: Label: ABC (ABCS-713); MCA (MCAD-31343); Format:	26	8	7	—	—	—	
1971	B.B. King in London: Released: Label: ABC (ABCX-730); MCA (MCAD-10843); Format:	57	15	—	—	—	—	
1972	L.A. Midnight: Released: Label: ABC (ABCX-743); Format:	53	21	—	—	—	—	
1972	Guess Who: Released: Label: ABC (ABCX-759); MCA (MCAD-10351); Format:	65	14	—	—	—	—	
1973	To Know You Is to Love You: Released: Label: ABC (ABCX-794); MCA (MCAD-10414); Format:	71	13	—	—	—	—	
1974	Friends: Released: Label: ABC (ABCD-825); Format:	153	27	—	—	—	—	
1975	Lucille Talks Back: Released: Label: ABC (ABCD-898); Format:	—	—	—	—	—	—	
1977	King Size: Released: Label: ABC (AB-977); Format:	154	34	—	—	—	—	
1978	Midnight Believer: Released: Label: ABC (AA-1061); MCA (MCAD-27011); Format:	124	27	—	—	—	—	
1979	Take It Home: Released: Label: MCA (MCA-3151); MCA (MCAD-11770); Format:	112	22	—	—	—	—	
1981	There Must Be a Better World Somewhere: Released: Label: MCA (MCA-5162); MCA (MCAD-27034); Format:	131	26	—	—	—	—	
1982	Love Me Tender: Released: Label: MCA (MCA-5307); MCA (MCAD-886); Format:	179	45	—	—	—	—	
1983	Blues 'N' Jazz: Released: Label: MCA (MCA-5413); MCA (MCAD-27119); Format:	172	38	21	—	—	—	
1985	Six Silver Strings: Released: Label: MCA (MCAD-5616); Format:	—	31	23	—	—	—	
1988	King of the Blues: 1989: Released: Label: MCA (MCAD-42183); Format:	—	—	—	—	—	—	
1991	There Is Always One More Time: Released: Label: MCA (MCAD-10295); Format:	—	76	—	—	—	—	
1993	Blues Summit: Released: Label: MCA (MCAD-10710); Format:	182	64	—	—	—	93	
1994	Diane Schuur & B.B. King - Heart to Heart: Released: Label: GRP (GRD-9767); Format: CD, Cassette	—	—	6	—	—	—	
1995	Lucille & Friends: Released: Label: MCA [Australia/Europe only] (MCD-33008); Format:	—	—	—	—	95	—	
1997	Deuces Wild: Released: Label: MCA (MCAD-11711); Format:	73	—	—	1	67	33	MC: Platinum; PROMUSICAE: Gold; RIAA: Gold; RMNZ: Gold
1998	Blues on the Bayou: Released: Label: MCA (MCAD-11879); Format:	186	—	—	2	—	—	
1999	Let the Good Times Roll: Released: Label: MCA (088 112042-2); Format:	—	—	—	2	—	—	
2000	B.B. King & Eric Clapton - Riding with the King: Released: Label: Reprise Records (9 47612-2); Format:	3	—	—	—	5	3	ARIA: Platinum; BPI: Gold; BVMI: Gold; CAPIF: Gold; FIMI: Platinum; IFPI AUT: Gold; IFPI DEN: Platinum; IFPI EUR: Platinum; IFPI GRC: Platinum; IFPI HKG: Gold; IFPI SWI: Gold; MC: Platinum; NVPI: Gold; PMB: Gold; PROMUSICAE: Gold; RIAA: 2× Platinum; RIAJ: Platinum; RMNZ: Gold; SNEP: Gold
2000	Makin' Love Is Good for You: Released: Label: MCA (088 112299-2); Format:	—	—	—	2	—	—	
2001	A Christmas Celebration of Hope (also released in 2003 as 20th Century Masters/The Christmas Collection: The Best of B.B. King): Released: Label: MCA (088 112756-2); MCA (B0000707-02); Format:	151	—	—	1	—	—	
2003	Reflections: Released: Label: MCA (B0000532-02); Format:	165	—	—	2	—	—	
2005	B.B. King & Friends: 80: Released: Label: Geffen (B0005263-02); Format:	45	—	—	1	—	78	
2008	One Kind Favor: Released: Label: Geffen (B0011791-02); Format:	37	—	—	1	—	78	
"—" denotes releases that did not chart.

== Live albums ==
Year	Album	Label	Peak chart positions			
Year	Album	Label	US	US R&B	US Blues	US Jazz
1965	Live at the Regal; Recorded on November 21, 1964, at the Regal Theater in Chicago.	ABC-Paramount ABC-509	78	—	—	—
1965	Live! B.B. King on Stage; This fake live album contains old studio recordings with overdubbed audience.	Kent Records KLP-5015, KST-515	—	—	—	—
1967	Blues Is King; Recorded on November 5, 1966 at the International Club in Chicago.	ABC-BluesWay BLS-6001	—	—	—	—
1969	Live & Well (Side A); Recorded in early March, 1969, at the Village Gate in New York City.	ABC-BluesWay BLS-6031	—	—	—	—
1971	Live in Cook County Jail; Recorded on September 10, 1970, in Cook County Jail in Chicago.	ABC Records ABCS-713	25	1	—	3
1974	B.B. King and Bobby Bland Together for the First Time... Live; Recorded live in 1974 at Western Recorders Studio in Los Angeles.	ABC-Dunhill DSD-80190	43	2	—	—
1976	Bobby Bland and B.B. King Together Again...Live; Recorded in 1976 at the Coconut Grove in Los Angeles.	ABC-Impulse ASD-9317	73	9	—	—
1980	Now Appearing at Ole Miss; Recorded in 1979 at the University of Mississippi.	MCA Records MCA-5162	162	45	—	21
1982	The Crusaders with B.B. King - Royal Jam; Recorded in September 1981 with the Crusaders and the Royal Philharmonic Orchestra at the Royal Festival Hall in London.	MCA Records MCA2-8017	144	—	—	—
1982	Live in London; Recorded in September 1981 with his orchestra at the Royal Festival Hall in London.	Crusaders Records/MCA CRP-16013	—	—	—	—
1990	Live at San Quentin; Recorded on May 25, 1990 at San Quentin State Prison in Marin County, California.	MCA Records MCAD-6455	—	—	—	—
1991	Live at the Apollo; Recorded on November 10, 1990 at the Apollo Theater in Harlem, New York.	GRP Records GRD-9637	—	—	—	—
1993	Live at Montreux; DVD/Blu-ray	Eagle Vision HD – ERBRD5028	—	—	—	—
1996	How Blue Can You Get? Classic Live Performances 1964-1994; Compilation of previous albums.	MCA Records MCAD2-11443	—	—	—	—
1999	Live in Japan (recorded 1971); Recorded on March 4 and 7, 1971 in Sankei Hall, Tokyo.	ABC Records GW-131 (1971 LP issue); MCA Records MCAD-11910 (1999 CD reissue)	—	—	—	—
2007	B.B. King Live; Recorded in October 2006 at the B.B. King Blues Clubs in Nashville and Memphis.	Geffen B0009770-02	—	—	11	—
2008	Live at the BBC; Recorded at London-Hammersmith Odeon (1978), London-Maida Vale (1989), Glasgow Jazzfest (1991) and Croydon-Fairfield Halls (1998).	Geffen B0012448-02; Universal-Island Records 6007 5306314 9	—	—	1	—
"—" denotes releases that did not chart.

== Major compilation albums ==
Year	Album	Label
1962	Twist With B.B. King	Crown Records CLP-5248
1963	16 of the Best of B.B. King [reissued in 1968 as 16 Greatest Hits]	Galaxy Records 8202; reissue: Galaxy Records 8208
1964	Rock Me Baby...14 Great Hits	Kent Records KLP-5012, KST-512
1967	The Jungle	Kent Records KLP-5021, KST-521
1968	From The Beginning (2xLP)	Kent Records KLP-5033, KST-533
1968	His Best – The Electric B. B. King	ABC-BluesWay Records BLS-6022
1973	The Best of B.B. King	ABC Records ABCX-767
1981	Great Moments With B.B. King (2xLP)	MCA Records MCA2-4124
1983	Why I Sing the Blues	MCA Special Products MCAD-20256
1986	Ambassador of The Blues (UK/Europe only)	Crown Records GEM-001
1987	You Done Lost Your Good Thing Now	Kent Records KLP-2004
1992	King of the Blues (4-CD box set)	MCA Records MCAD4-10677
1994	The Very Best Of B.B. King (UK/Europe only)	MCA Records MCBD-19505
1998	Greatest Hits	MCA Records MCAD-11746
1999	His Definitive Greatest Hits (2-CD) (UK/Europe only)	MCA Records MCD-11921
1999	The Best of B.B. King: 20th Century Masters/The Millennium Collection	MCA Records MCD-11939; Geffen Records B0007714 02
1999	The RPM Hits 1951-1957	Ace Records CDCHD 712
2000	The Best of the Kent Singles 1957-1971	Ace Records CDCHD 760
2000	Anthology (2-CD)	MCA Records 088 112410-2
2002	The Modern Recordings 1950-1951 (2-CD)	Ace Records CDCHM2 835
2002	The Vintage Years (4-CD box set)	Ace Records ABOXCD 8
2003	Blues Kingpins: B.B. King	Virgin Records 72435 82712 25
2005	The Ultimate Collection	Geffen Records B0003854 02
2006	Gold (2-CD) (reissue of 088 112410-2)	Geffen Records B0006587 02
2007	The Best of the Early Years	Ace Records CDCHD 1150
2011	B.B. King: ICON 2 (2-CD)	Geffen Records B0015302 02
2012	Ladies and Gentlemen...Mr. B.B. King (10-CD box set)	Universal Music Group 6007 5338499 2
2012	Ladies and Gentlemen...Mr. B.B. King (4-CD box set)	Universal Music Group 6007 5339086 3
2019	All Time Greats: B.B. King (2-CD) (UK/Europe only)	Universal Music Group 6007 5389516 0

== Singles ==
=== Bullet Records ===
Year	Title	Single information	Peak chart position				Album
Year	Title	Single information	US R&B	US	US Rock	UK	Album
1949	"Miss Martha King" b/w "When Your Baby Packs Up and Goes"	Bullet Records; Bullet 309 (Note: Miss Martha King: 309-A, When Your Baby Packs Up and Goes: 309-B.)	—	—	—	—	These titles have never been published in an album. Only "Miss Martha King" was reissued in 1992 in the 4-CD box set King of the Blues (MCAD4-10677).
1949	"Got the Blues" b/w "Take a Swing with Me"	Bullet Records; Bullet 315 (Note: Got the Blues: 315-A, Take a Swing with Me: 315-B.)	—	—	—	—	These titles have never been published in an album. Only "Miss Martha King" was reissued in 1992 in the 4-CD box set King of the Blues (MCAD4-10677).
"—" denotes releases that did not chart.

=== Modern Records (with RPM and Kent subsidiaries) ===
Year	Title	Single information	Peak chart position				Album
Year	Title	Single information	US R&B	US	US Rock	UK	Album
1950	"Mistreated Woman" b/w "B.B. Boogie"	RPM Records 304 (September 1950); RPM 304 (Note: "Mistreated Woman": 304A-MM-1404, "B.B. Boogie": 304B-MM-1405.)	—	—	—	—	
1950	"The Other Night Blues" b/w "Walkin′ and Cryin′"	RPM Records (December 1950); RPM 311 (Note: "Walkin′ and Cryin′": 311A-MM-1439-1, "The Other Night Blues": 311B-MM-1438-2.)	—	—	—	—	
1951	"Don't You Want a Man Like Me" b/w "My Baby's Gone"	RPM Records (c. June 1951); RPM 318 (Note: "Don't You Want a Man Like Me": 318A-1470, "My Baby's Gone": 318B-1469.)	—	—	—	—	
1951	"She's Dynamite" b/w "B.B.'s Blues"	RPM Records (c. June 1951); RPM 323 (Note: "B.B.'s Blues": 323-1489, "She's Dynamite": 323-1563.)	—	—	—	—	
1951	"She's a Mean Woman" b/w "Hard Workin' Woman"	RPM Records (September 1951); RPM 330 (Note: "She's a Mean Woman": 330-1604, "Hard Workin' Woman": 330-1605.)	—	—	—	—	
1951	"3 O'Clock Blues" b/w "That Ain't the Way to Do It"	RPM Records (December 1951); RPM 339 (Note: "3 O'Clock Blues": 339-1682, "That Ain't the Way to Do It": 339-1683.)	1	—	—	—	reissued in Singin' the Blues
1952	"Fine Lookin' Woman" b/w "She Don't Move Me No More"	RPM Records (c. March–April 1952); RPM 348 (Note: "Fine Lookin' Woman": 348-1491, "She Don't Move Me No More": 348-1752.)	—	—	—	—	N/A
1952	"Shake It Up and Go" b/w "My Own Fault, Darlin′" (Note: Re-recorded for My Kind of Blues)	RPM Records (c. April–July 1952); RPM 355 (Note: "Shake It Up and Go": 355-1805, "My Own Fault, Darlin′": 355-1806.)	—	—	—	—	N/A
1952	"Some Day Some Where" b/w "Gotta Find My Baby"	RPM Records (c. July 1952); RPM 360 (Note: "Some Day Some Where": 360-1843, "Gotta Find My Baby": 360-1844.)	—	—	—	—	N/A
1952	"You Know I Love You" b/w "You Didn't Want Me"	RPM Records (September 1952); RPM 363 (Note: "You Know I Love You": 363-1865, "You Didn't Want Me": 363-1866.)	1	—	—	—	reissued in Singin' the Blues
1952	"Story from My Heart and Soul" b/w "Boogie Woogie Woman"	RPM Records (December 1952); RPM 374 (Note: "Story from My Heart and Soul": 374-1924, "Boogie Woogie Woman": 374-1925.)	9	—	—	—	N/A
1953	"Woke Up This Morning (My Baby She Was Gone)" b/w "Don't Have to Cry" (Note: Titled "Past Day" in the album The Blues.)	RPM Records (March 1953); RPM 380 (Note: "Woke Up This Morning": 380-1940, "Don't Have to Cry": 380-1941.)	3	—	—	—	reissued in Singin' the Blues
1953	"Please Love Me" b/w "Highway Bound"	RPM Records (June 1953); RPM 386 (Note: "Please Love Me": 386-1960, "Highway Bound": 386-1961.)	1	—	—	—	reissued in Singin' the Blues
1953	"Please Hurry Home" b/w "Neighborhood Affair"	RPM Records (August 1953); RPM 391 (Note: "Neighborhood Affair": 391-2014, "Please Hurry Home": 391-2015.)	4	—	—	—	N/A
1953	"Blind Love" b/w "Why Did You Leave Me"	RPM Records (November 1953); RPM 395 (Note: "Why Did You Leave Me": 395-2024, "Please Hurry Home": 395-2025.)	—	—	—	—	reissued in Singin' the Blues
1954	"Please Help Me" b/w "Praying to the Lord"	RPM Records (February 1954); RPM 403	—	—	—	—	N/A
1954	"Love You Baby" b/w "The Woman I Love"	RPM Records (April 1954); RPM 408 (Note: "Love You Baby": 408-2069, "The Woman I Love": 408-2070.)	31	—	—	—	reissued in B.B. King Wails
1954	"Everything I Do Is Wrong" b/w "Don't You Want a Man Like Me" [re-make]	RPM Records (June 1954); RPM 411 (Note: "Everything I Do Is Wrong": 411-2090, "Don't You Want a Man Like Me": 411-2091.)	—	—	—	—	reissued in The Blues
1954	"When My Heart Beats Like a Hammer" b/w "Bye! Bye! Baby"	RPM Records (July 1954); RPM 412 (Note: "When My Heart Beats Like...": 412-2100, "Bye! Bye! Baby": 412-2101.)	8	—	—	—	reissued in The Blues
1954	"You Upset Me Baby" b/w "Whole Lotta' Love"	RPM Records (september 1954); RPM 416 (Note: "You Upset Me Baby": 416-2121, "Whole Lotta' Love": 416-2122.)	1; 8	—	—	—	reissued in Singin' the Blues
1955	"Every Day I Have the Blues" (Note: "Everyday I Have the Blues" was the b-side to "Sneaking Around.") b/w "Sneakin' Around"	RPM Records (January 1955); RPM 421 (Note: "Sneakin' Around": 421-2139, "Every Day I Have the Blues": 421-2140.)	8; 14	—	—	—	reissued in Singin' the Blues
1955	"Lonely and Blue" b/w "Jump with You Baby"	RPM Records (April 1955); RPM 425 (Note: "Lonely and Blue": 425-2062, "Jump with You Baby": 425-2063.)	—	—	—	—	N/A
1955	"I'm in Love" b/w "Shut Your Mouth"	RPM Records (June 1955); RPM 430 (Note: "Shut Your Mouth": 430-2188, "I'm in Love": 430-2189.)	—	—	—	—	N/A
1955	"Talkin' the Blues" b/w "Boogie Rock"	RPM Records (July 1955); RPM 435 (Note: "Talkin' the Blues": 435-2206, "Boogie Rock": 435-2207.)	—	—	—	—	N/A
1955	"Ten Long Years" (Note: "Ten Long Years" was the b-side to "What Can I Do (Just Sing the Blues).") b/w "What Can I Do"	RPM Records (September 1955); RPM 437 (Note: What Can I Do: 437-2212, Ten Long Years: 437-2213.)	9	—	—	—	reissued in Singin' the Blues
1955	"I'm Cracking Up Over You" b/w "Ruby Lee"	RPM Records (November 1955); RPM 450 (Note: "I'm Cracking Up Over You": 450-2264, "Ruby Lee": 450-2265.)	—	—	—	—	N/A
1955	"Crying Won't Help You" b/w "Can't We Talk It Over" (Note: "Can't We Talk It Over" or "16 Tons" (non-album track) on different releases)	RPM Records (December 1955); RPM 451 (Note: "16 Tons": 451-2268, "Crying Won't Help You": 451-2269, "Can't We Talk It Over": 451-2270.)	15	—	—	—	reissued in Singin' the Blues
1956	"Let's Do the Boogie" b/w "Did You Ever Love a Woman"	RPM Records (March 1956); RPM 457 (Note: "Let's Do the Boogie": 457-2281, "Did You Ever Love a Woman": 457-2282.)	—	—	—	—	reissued in Singin' the Blues
1956	"Dark Is the Night (Part I)" b/w "Dark Is the Night (Part II)"	RPM Records (May 1956); RPM 459 (Note: "Dark Is the Night (Part I)": 459-3006, "Part II": 459-3007.)	—	—	—	—	
1956	"Sweet Little Angel" b/w "Bad Luck"	RPM Records (July 1956); RPM 468 (Note: "Sweet Little Angel": 468-3057, "Bad Luck": 468-3058.)	6; 3	—	—	—	reissued in Singin' the Blues
1956	"On My Word of Honor" b/w "Bim Bam"	RPM Records (November 1956); RPM 479 (Note: "On My Word of Honor": 479-3084, "Bim Bam": 479-3085.)	3	—	—	—	N/A
1957	"Early in the Morning" b/w "You Don't Know"	RPM Records (January 1957); RPM 486 (Note: "Early in the Morning": 486-3123, "You Don't Know": 486-3124.)	—	—	—	—	reissued in The Blues
1957	"How Do I Love You" b/w "You Can't Fool My Heart"	RPM Records (March 1957); RPM 490 (Note: "How Do I Love You": 490-3139, "You Can't Fool My Heart": 490-3140.)	—	—	—	—	N/A
1957	"I Want to Get Married" b/w "Troubles, Troubles, Troubles"	RPM Records (April 1957); RPM 492 (Note: "I Want to Get Married": 492-3151, "Troubles, Troubles, Troubles": 492-3152.)	14; 13	—	—	—	reissued in The Blues
1957	"Quit My Baby" b/w "Be Careful with a Fool"	RPM Records (June 1957); RPM 494 (Note: "Quit My Baby": 494-3163, "Be Careful with a Fool": 494-3164.)	—	95	—	—	reissued in The Great B.B. King
1957	"I Wonder" b/w "I Need You So Bad"	RPM Records (September 1957); RPM 498 (Note: "I Wonder": 498-3173, "I Need You So Bad": 498-3174.)	—	85	—	—	
1957	"The Key to My Kingdom" b/w "My Heart Belongs to Only You"	RPM Records (November 1957); RPM 501 (Note: The Key to My Kingdom: 501-3179, My Heart Belongs to Only You 501-3180.)	—	—	—	—	
1958	"Why Do Everything Happen to Me" b/w "You Know I Go for You"	Kent Records (March 1958); Kent 301 (Note: You Know I Go for You: 301-1, Why Do Everything Happen to Me: 301-2.)	—	—	—	—	reissued in The Blues
1958	"Don't Look Now, But I've Got the Blues" b/w "Days of Old"	Kent Records (July 1958); Kent 307 (Note: "Don't Look Now, But I've Got the Blues": 307-1, "Days of Old": 307-2.)	—	—	—	—	reissued in The Great B.B. King
1958	"Please Accept My Love" b/w "You've Been an Angel"	Kent Records (October 1958); Kent 315 (Note: "Please Accept My Love": 315-1, "You've Been an Angel": 315-2.)	9; 16	—	—	—	
1959	"I Am" b/w "Worry Worry"	Kent Records (February 1959); Kent 317 (Note: "I Am": 317-1, "Worry Worry": 317-2.)	—	—	—	—	
1959	"Come by Here" b/w "The Fool"	Kent Records (April 1959); Kent 319 (Note: "Come by Here": 319-A, "The Fool": 319-B.)	—	—	—	—	reissued in B.B. King Wails
1959	"A Lonely Lover's Plea" b/w "Woman I Love"	Kent Records (c. June 1959); Kent 325 (Note: "A Lonely Lover's Plea": 325-A, "Woman I Love": 325-B.)	—	—	—	—	
1959	"Every Day I Have the Blues" [re-make; with Maxwell Davis conducting members of the Count Basie orchestra] b/w "Time to Say Goodbye"	Kent Records (September 1959); Kent 327 (Note: "Everyday I Have the Blues": 327-A, "Time to Say Goodbye": 327-B.)	—	—	—	—	Compositions of Count Basie and Others
1959	"Mean Ole Frisco" b/w "Sugar Mama"	Kent Records (c. October–November 1959); Kent 329 (Note: "Mean Ole Frisco": 329-A, "Sugar Mama": 329-B.)	—	—	—	—	N/A
1959	"Sweet Sixteen, Pt. 1" b/w "Sweet Sixteen, Pt. 2"	Kent Records (December 1959); Kent 330 (Note: "Sweet Sixteen Pt. 1": 330-1, "Sweet Sixteen Pt. 2": 330-2.)	2	—	—	—	reissued in The Great B.B. King
1960	"Got a Right to Love My Baby" b/w "My Own Fault"	Kent Records (c. May 1960); Kent 333 (Note: "Got a Right to Love My Baby": 333-1, "My Own Fault": 333-2.)	8	—	—	—	King of the Blues
1960	"Good Man Gone Bad" b/w "Partin' Time"	Kent Records (July 1960); Kent 346 (Note: "Good Man Gone Bad": 346-1, "Partin' Time": 346-2.)	8	—	—	—	King of the Blues
1960	"You Done Lost Your Good Thing Now" b/w "Walking Dr. Bill"	Kent Records (September 1960); Kent 350 (Note: "You Done Lost Your Good Thing Now": 350-1, "Walking Dr. Bill": 350-2.)	23	—	—	—	My Kind of Blues
1960	"Things Are Not the Same" b/w "Fishin After Me"	Kent Records (November 1960); Kent 351 (Note: "Things Are Not the Same": 351-2, "Fishin Time": 351-2.)	—	—	—	—	My Kind of Blues
1961	"Someday"	Kent 360	16	—	—	—	
1961	"Peace of Mind"	Kent 360	7	119	—	—	More
Notice - Although King had signed to ABC Records in January 1962, his former company Modern/RPM continued to release singles and albums until 1971. The recording dates are before 1962. The exception is a "contractual settlement" session recorded in 1965, which spawned six new recordings for Kent.
1962	"My Sometime Baby"	Kent 365	24	—	—	—	Blues in My Heart
1962	"Gonna Miss You Around Here"	Kent 372	17	—	—	—	
1963	"The Road I Travel"	Kent 390	—	—	—	—	Sings Spirituals
1963	"Christmas Celebration" b/w "Easy Listening Blues"	Kent 387	—	—	—	—	Easy Listening Blues
1964	"Rock Me Baby"	Kent 393	12	34	—	—	Rock Me Baby...14 Great Hits
1964	"Let Me Love You"	Kent 396	15	110	—	—	Let Me Love You
1964	"Beautician Blues"	Kent 403	15	82	—	—	The Jungle
1964	"The Worst Thing in My Life"	Kent 415	—	—	—	—	The Jungle
1965	"Blue Shadows"	Kent 426	25	97	—	—	The Jungle
1966	"Eyesight to the Blind"	Kent 441	31	—	—	—	The Jungle
1966	"Ain't Nobody's Business"	Kent 447	—	—	—	—	The Jungle
1966	"I Stay in the Mood"	Kent 450	45	—	—	—	The Jungle
1967	"It's a Mean World"	Kent 458	49	—	—	—	The Jungle
1967	"The Jungle"	Kent 462	17	94	—	—	The Jungle
1968	"The Woman I Love"	Kent 492	31	94	—	—	B.B. King Wails
1971	"That Evil Child" b/w "Tell Me Baby"	Kent KS 4542	34	97	—	—	
"—" denotes releases that did not chart.

=== ABC Records (and BluesWay subsidiary) ===
Year	Title	Single information	Peak chart position				Album
Year	Title	Single information	US R&B	US	US Rock	UK	Album
1962	"I'm Gonna Sit in Till You Give In" b/w "You Ask Me"	ABC-Paramount; ABC-10316	—	—	—	—	Mr. Blues
1962	"My Baby's Comin' Home" b/w "Blues at Midnight"	ABC-Paramount; ABC-10334	—	—	—	—	Mr. Blues
1963	"Sneakin' Around" b/w "Chains of Love"	ABC-Paramount (March 1963); ABC-10361	—	—	—	—	Mr. Blues
1963	"Tomorrow Night" b/w "Mother's Love"	ABC-Paramount; ABC-10367	—	—	—	—	Mr. Blues
1963	"Guess Who" b/w "By Myself"	ABC-Paramount; ABC-10390	—	—	—	—	Mr. Blues
1963	"Young Dreams" b/w "On My Word of Honor"	ABC-Paramount; ABC-10455	—	—	—	—	Mr. Blues
1963	"Slowly Losing My Mind" b/w "How Do I Love You"	ABC-Paramount; ABC-10486	—	—	—	—	
1963	"How Blue Can You Get" b/w "Please Accept My Love"	ABC-Paramount; ABC-10527	21	97	—	—	
1964	"Help the Poor" b/w "I Wouldn't Have It Any Other Way"	ABC-Paramount; ABC-10552	24	98	—	—	
1964	"The Hurt" b/w "Whole Lotta Lovin'"	ABC-Paramount; ABC-10576	—	—	—	—	
1964	"Never Trust a Woman" b/w "Worryin' Blues"	ABC-Paramount; ABC-10599	29	90	—	—	
1964	"Please Send Me Someone to Love" b/w "Stop Leading Me On"	ABC-Paramount; ABC-10616	—	—	—	—	Confessin' the Blues
1964	"Every Day I Have the Blues" b/w "It's My Own Fault"	ABC-Paramount; ABC-10634	—	—	—	—	
1964	"Night Owl" b/w "Tired of Your Jive"	ABC-Paramount; ABC-10675	—	—	—	—	His Best – The Electric B.B. King
1965	"I Need You" b/w "Never Could Be You"	ABC-Paramount; ABC-10710	—	—	—	—	
1965	"All Over Again" b/w "The Things You Put Me Through"	ABC-Paramount; ABC-10724	—	—	—	—	His Best – The Electric B.B. King
1965	"I'd Rather Drink Muddy Water" b/w "Goin' to Chicago Blues"	ABC-Paramount; ABC-10754	—	—	—	—	Confessin' the Blues
1965	"You're Still a Square" b/w "Tormented"	ABC-Paramount; ABC-10766	—	—	—	—	
1966	"Don't Answer the Door, Pt. I" b/w "Don't Answer the Door, Pt. II"	ABC-Paramount; ABC-10856	2	72	—	—	Blues Is King
1966	"Waitin' on You" b/w "Night Life"	ABC-Paramount; ABC-10889	—	112	—	—	Blues Is King
1967	"I Don't Want You Cuttin' Off Your Hair" b/w "Think It Over"	ABC-BluesWay (April 1967); BL 45-61004 (Note: "I Don't Want You Cuttin' Off Your Hair": AMP 45-14129.)	—	—	—	—	His Best – The Electric B.B. King
1967	"Worried Dream" b/w "That's Wrong, Little Mama"	ABC-BluesWay; BL 45-61007 (Note: "Worried Dream": AMP 45-14129, "That's Wrong Little Mama": AMP 45-14130.)	—	—	—	—	Blues on Top of Blues
1968	"Paying the Cost to Be the Boss" b/w "Having My Say"	ABC-BluesWay; BL 45-61015 (Note: "Paying the Cost to Be the Boss": AMP 45-14244, "Having My Say": AMP 45-14131.)	10	39	—	—	His Best – The Electric B.B. King
1968	"Losing Faith in You" b/w "I'm Gonna Do What They Do to Me"	ABC-BluesWay; BL 45-61018 (Note: "Losing Faith in You": AMP 45-14243, "I'm Gonna Do What They Do to Me": AMP 45-14245.)	26	74	—	—	Blues on Top of Blues
1968	"The B.B. Jones" b/w "You Put It on Me" (Note: The singel BL-61019 was issued with two differents labels, one "B.B. Jones" b/w "You Put It on Me", one "B.B. Jones" b/w "Stop Putting the Hurt on Me".)	ABC-BluesWay; BL 45-61019 (Note: |"The B.B. Jones": AMP 45-15097, "You Put It on Me": AMP 45-15096, "Stop Putting the Hurt on Me": 45-14627.)	— 25	98; 82	—	—	His Best – The Electric B.B. King
1969	"I Want You So Bad" b/w "Get Off My Back Woman" (Note: "Get Off My Back Woman" was the b-side of "I Want You So Bad.")	ABC-BluesWay; BL 45-61026	34; 32	127; 74	—	—	Live & Well
1969	"Why I Sing the Blues" b/w "Friends"	ABC-BluesWay; BL 45-61024 (Note: "Why I Sing the Blues": AMP 45-15725, "Friends": AMP 45-15723.)	13	61	—	—	Live & Well
1969	"Just a Little Love" b/w "My Mood"	ABC-BluesWay; BL 45-61029 (Note: "Just a Little Love": AMP 45-70001, "My Mood": AMP 45-70002.)	15	76	—	—	Live & Well
1970	"The Thrill Is Gone" b/w "You're Mean"	ABC-BluesWay; BL 45-61032 (Note: "The Thrill Is Gone": AMP 45-70112, "You're Mean": AMP 45-70106.)	3	15	—	—	Completely Well
1970	"So Excited" b/w "Confessin' the Blues"	ABC-BluesWay; BL 45-61035 (Note: "So excided": AMP 45-70078, "Confessin' the Blues": AMP 45-70110.)	14	54	—	—	Completely Well
1970	"Hummingbird" b/w "Ask Me No Questions"	ABC Records; ABC 45-11268 (Note: "Hummingbird": AMP 45-16052, "Ask Me No Questions": AMP 45-16054.)	18	48	—	—	Indianola Mississippi Seeds
1970	"Chains and Things" b/w "King's Special"	ABC Records; ABC 45-11280 (Note: "Chains and Things": AMP 45-16069-S, "King's Special": AMP 45-16053-S.)	6	45	—	—	Indianola Mississippi Seeds
1971	"Ask Me No Questions" b/w "Nobody Loves Me But My Mother"	ABC Records; ABC 45-11290 (Note: "Ask Me No Questions": AMP 45-16054, "Nobody Loves Me But My Mother": AMP 45-16072.)	25	40	—	—	Indianola Mississippi Seeds
1971	"Help the Poor" (re-recording) b/w "Lucille's Granny"	ABC Records; ABC 45-11302 (Note: "Help the Poor": AMP 45-16191-S, "Lucille's Granny": AMP 45-16198-S.)	36	90	—	—	L.A. Midnight
1971	"Ghetto Woman" b/w "The Seven Minutes"	ABC Records; ABC 45-11310 (Note: "Ghetto Woman": AMP 45-16239-S, "The Seven Minutes": AMP 45-16193-S.)	25	68	—	—	B.B. King in London; From the Motion Picture The Seven Minutes
1972	"Sweet Sixteen" (re-recording)	ABC 11319	37	93	—	—	L.A. Midnight
1972	"I Got Some Help I Don't Need"	ABC 11321	28	92	—	—	L.A. Midnight
1972	"Ain't Nobody Home"	ABC 11316	28	46	—	—	B. B. King in London
1972	"Guess Who" (re-recording)	ABC 11330	21	62	—	—	Guess Who
1973	"To Know You Is to Love You"	ABC 11373	12	38	—	—	To Know You Is to Love You
1974	"I Like to Live the Love"	ABC 11406	6	28	—	—	To Know You Is to Love You
1974	"Who Are You"	ABC 11433	27	78	—	—	To Know You Is to Love You
1974	"Philadelphia"	ABC 12029	19	64	—	—	Friends
1975	"My Song"	ABC 12053	—	—	—	—	Friends
1975	"Friends" (re-recording)	ABC 12053	34	—	—	—	Friends
1976	"Let the Good Times Roll"	ABC Impulse 31006	20	101	—	—	Bobby Bland and B. B. King Together Again...Live
1977	"Slow and Easy"	ABC 12247	88	—	—	—	King Size
1978	"Never Make a Move Too Soon"	ABC 12380	19	102	—	—	Midnight Believer
1978	"I Just Can't Leave Your Love Alone"	ABC 12412	90	—	—	—	Midnight Believer
1979	"Better Not Look Down"	MCA 41062	30	110	—	—	Take It Home
1981	"There Must Be a Better World Somewhere"	MCA 51101	91	—	—	—	There Must Be a Better World Somewhere
1985	"Into the Night"	MCA 52530	15	107	—	—	Six Silver Strings
1985	"Big Boss Man" / "My Guitar Sings The Blues"	MCA 52675	62	—	—	—	Six Silver Strings
1989	"When Love Comes to Town" (with U2)	Island 7-99225	—	68	2	6	Rattle and Hum
1992	"The Blues Come Over Me"	MCA 54339	63	—	—	—	There is Always One More Time
1992	"Since I Met You Baby" (with Gary Moore)	Virgin [UK] 1423	—	—	—	59	After Hours
2000	"Riding with the King" (with Eric Clapton)	Reprise 7-16831	—	—	26	—	Riding with the King
"—" denotes releases that did not chart.

=== Billboard Year-End performances ===
Year	Song	Year-End Position
1970	"The Thrill Is Gone"	98

== Other appearances ==
Year	Song	Album
1968	"You Put It On Me", "The B.B. Jones", "Messy But Good" (with Quincy Jones)	For Love of Ivy (Original Soundtrack)
1970	"Every Day I Have the Blues", "How Blue Can You Get", "That's Wrong Little Mama", "Why I Sing the Blues", "Please Accept My Love" (as opening act to The Rolling Stones on tour)	Get Yer Ya-Ya's Out (3-CD Deluxe box set)
1995	"Stormy Monday Blues" (with GRP All-Star Big Band)	All Blues
2001	"Three O'Clock Blues" (with Jimmy Smith)	Dot Com Blues
2001	"Let the Good Times Roll" (with Tony Bennett)	Playin' With My Friends
2010	"The Thrill is Gone" (with Stevie Wonder)	The 25th Anniversary Rock & Roll Hall of Fame Concerts
2012	"Praying Man" (with Big K.R.I.T.)	Live from the Underground
2014	"On the Way" (Various artists)	The Art of McCartney
