= His Definitive Greatest Hits =

Greatest hits album by B. B. King
- Released: April 12, 1999
- Genres: Blues, electric blues, rhythm and blues, blues rock, soul blues, Memphis blues
- Length: 142:11
- Label: Polygram
- Compiler: Richard Ganter

B. B. King chronology
| The Best of B.B. King (1999) | His Definitive Greatest Hits (1999) | Live in Japan (1999) |

Professional ratings
Review scores
| Source | Rating |
|---|---|
| AllMusic | 4/5 stars |
| The Penguin Guide to Blues Recordings | 4/4 stars |

His Definitive Greatest Hits is a compilation album by American blues musician B. B. King. It was produced, sequenced and compiled by Richard M. Ganter and released on April 12, 1999, by Polygram Records.

== Track listing ==
Disc one
| No. | Title | Writer(s) | Producer | Length |
|---|---|---|---|---|
| 1. | "The Thrill Is Gone" (from Completely Well) | Roy Hawkins, Rick Darnell | Bill Szymczyk | 5:27 |
| 2. | "Paying the Cost to Be the Boss" (from Blues on Top of Blues) | Riley King | Johnny Pate | 2:34 |
| 3. | "Don't Answer the Door" (parts one and two) (from Live & Well) | Jimmy Johnson | Pate | 5:11 |
| 4. | "I Like to Live the Love" (from To Know You Is to Love You) | Dave Crawford, Charles Mann | Dave Crawford | 3:30 |
| 5. | "How Blue Can You Get" (from Blues in My Heart) | Jane Feather | Sid Feller | 2:42 |
| 6. | "Why I Sing the Blues" (from Live & Well) | King, Dave Clark | | 8:37 |
| 7. | "Chains and Things" (from Indianola Mississippi Seeds) | King, Clark | | 4:54 |
| 8. | "To Know You Is to Love You" (from the album of the same name) | Stevland Morris, Syreeta Wright | Crawford | 4:13 |
| 9. | "When Love Comes to Town" (with U2; 7″ edit and mix) (from Rattle and Hum) | Paul Hewson, David Evans, Adam Clayton, Larry Mullen Jr. | Jimmy Iovine | 4:13 |
| 10. | "Playin' With My Friends" (with Robert Cray) (from Blues Summit) | Robert Cray, Dennis Walker | | 5:19 |
| 11. | "Never Make Your Move Too Soon" (from Midnight Believer) | Nesbert Hooper, Will Jennings | Stewart Levine | 5:31 |
| 12. | "Better Not Look Down" (from Take It Home) | Joe Sample, Jennings | Levine | 3:22 |
| 13. | "There Must Be a Better World Somewhere" (from the album of the same name) | Malcolm Rebennack Jr., Doc Pomus | Levine | 3:47 |
| 14. | "Hummingbird" (from Indianola Mississippi Seeds) | Claude Bridges | | 4:35 |
| 15. | "Everyday I Have the Blues" (Live at the Regal) | Peter Chatman | Pate | 2:40 |
| 16. | "Sweet Little Angel" (Live at the Regal) | King, Jules Taub | Pate | 3:47 |
| Total length: | | | | 74:40 |

Disc two
| No. | Title | Writer(s) | Producer(s) | Length |
|---|---|---|---|---|
| 1. | "Help the Poor" (previously unreleased) | Charlie Singleton | Feller | 2:41 |
| 2. | "So Excited" (from Completely Well) | King, Gerald Jemmott | Szymczyk | 5:35 |
| 3. | "Broken Heart" (from Jazz ‘N’ Blues) | King, Joe Bihari | | 2:46 |
| 4. | "Ghetto Woman" (from B.B. King in London) | King, Clark | Ed Michel, Joe Zagarino | 5:15 |
| 5. | "Ain't Nobody Home" (from B.B. King in London) | Jerry Ragovoy | Michel, Zagarino | 3:15 |
| 6. | "Darlin' You Know I Love You" (from Singin' the Blues) | King, Taub | Sidney A. Seidenberg | 4:48 |
| 7. | "In the Midnight Hour" (from Six Silver Strings) | Wilson Pickett, Stephen Cropper | | 3:23 |
| 8. | "Into the Night" | Ira Newborn | John Landis, Ira Newborn | 4:12 |
| 9. | "My Lucille" | Newborn | | 3:41 |
| 10. | "The Blues Come Over Me" | Jennings, Sample | Levine | 5:15 |
| 11. | "Since I Met You Baby (with Gary Moore)" | Ivory Joe Hunter | | 2:52 |
| 12. | "I'm Moving On" | Jennings, Sample | Levine | 4:16 |
| 13. | "Let the Good Times Roll" (live) | Sam Theard, Fleecie Moore | Esmond Edwards | 5:31 |
| 14. | "Woke Up This Mornin'" (live) | King | | 1:49 |
| 15. | "Three O'Clock Blues" (live) | King, Taub | Steve Barri | 3:16 |
| 16. | "Please Love Me" (live) | King, Sam Ling | | 3:02 |
| 17. | "Caldonia" (live) | Moore | SASCO Productions | 4:01 |
| 18. | "Rock Me Baby" (live) | King, Joe Josea | | 3:29 |
| Total length: | | | | 67:31 |

== Charts ==
| Chart (1999–2000) | Peak position |
|---|---|
| Dutch Albums (Album Top 100) | 33 |
| Norwegian Albums (VG-lista) | 12 |
| Swedish Albums (Sverigetopplistan) | 41 |
| Swiss Albums (Schweizer Hitparade) | 31 |
| UK Albums (OCC) | 24 |

| Chart (2015) | Peak position |
|---|---|
| Australian Albums (ARIA) | 49 |
| German Albums (Offizielle Top 100) | 83 |

== Certifications ==
| Region | Certification | Certified units/sales |
|---|---|---|
| United Kingdom (BPI) | Silver | 68,252 |
