= The Ultimate Collection (B. B. King album) =

Greatest hits album by B.B. King
- Released: 2005
- Recorded: 1951–2000
- Genre: Electric blues, soul blues, rhythm and blues, blues-rock
- Length: 79:30

B.B. King chronology
Reflections (2003)	The Ultimate Collection (2005)	B. B. King & Friends: 80 (2005)

Professional ratings
Review scores
Source	Rating
AllMusic	4/5 stars

The Ultimate Collection is a compilation album by B.B. King, released in 2005.

== Track listing ==
1. "Three O'Clock Blues" (from Singin' the Blues) – 3:01
2. "Please Love Me" (from Singin' the Blues) – 2:48
3. "You Upset Me Baby" (from Singin' the Blues) – 3:01
4. "Sweet Sixteen" (from The Great B.B. King) – 6:12
5. "Rock Me Baby" (from the album of the same name) – 2:58
6. "How Blue Can You Get" (from Blues in My Heart) – 2:41
7. "Every Day I Have the Blues" (from Singin' the Blues) – 2:41
8. "Sweet Little Angel" (from Singin' the Blues) – 3:46
9. "Don't Answer the Door" (from Blues Is King) – 5:10
10. "Paying the Cost to Be the Boss" (from Blues On Top of Blues) – 2:33
11. "The Thrill is Gone" (from Completely Well) – 5:25
12. "Nobody Loves Me But My Mother" (from Indianola Mississippi Seeds) – 1:26
13. "Chains & Things" (w/ Carole King) (from Indianola Mississippi Seeds) – 4:53
14. "Ain't Nobody Home" (from Deuces Wild) – 3:14
15. "I Like to Live the Love" (from (from To Know You Is To Love You) – 3:17
16. "Never Make a Move Too Soon" (from Midnight Believer) – 5:30
17. "Better Not Look Down" (from Take It Home) – 3:20
18. "There Must Be a Better World Somewhere" (from the album of the same name) – 3:46
19. "When Love Comes to Town" (w/ U2) (from Rattle and Hum) – 4:17
20. "Ten Long Years" (w/ Eric Clapton) (from Riding with the King) – 4:40
21. "I'll Survive" (from Blues on the Bayou) – 4:51
