= One Kind Favor =

Studio album by B.B. King
- Released: August 26, 2008
- Recorded: 2008
- Studios: The Village Recorder, Los Angeles, California; Electro Magnetic Studios
- Length: 57:04
- Label: Geffen
- Producer: T Bone Burnett

B.B. King chronology
Live (2008)	One Kind Favor (2008)

One Kind Favor is B.B. King's forty-second and final studio album. Produced by T Bone Burnett, it was released on August 26, 2008, by Geffen Records.

The album won the Grammy Award for Best Traditional Blues Album at the 51st Grammy Awards.

== Background ==
T-Bone Burnett was brought on as the producer, and King himself noted regarding his production style, "He liked the sound of the records I made in the 1950s." The recording sessions for the album featured a twin-drum setup with Jim Keltner and Jay Bellerose. In a 2009 interview, Bellerose recalled, "Jim was like the captain. Sometimes we played the same parts, and other times while Jim played more intricate patterns, I focused purely on percussive elements."

Three of the tracks on the album are covers of songs previously recorded by Lonnie Johnson. King praised Johnson, saying, "I always wanted to be like Lonnie Johnson. I think he would have sounded great even in country or jazz."

The Japanese first edition (UICY-77459) was released on September 16, 2015, as an SHM-CD.

== Reception ==
Professional ratings
Aggregate scores
Source	Rating
Metacritic	83/100
Review scores
Source	Rating
All About Jazz	5/5 stars
AllMusic	4.5/5 stars
World of Music	4.5/5 stars
Paste	9.2/10
Rolling Stone	4/5 stars

Rolling Stone called it "one of the strongest studio sets of his career, standing alongside classics such as Singin' the Blues and Lucille." Both Rolling Stone and AllMusic commented on the stripped-down sound and lack of guest appearances which was departure in style from King's recent previous albums. Both credited T Bone Burnett for the shift in sound and praised him for his production. Bud Scoppa of Paste Magazine commented "Elegiac by intent, the record is awash in poignancy, radiating from the deeply felt guitar and vocal performances of the 83-year-old King and his supporting band... and from the carefully chosen material. But just as importantly, it boasts a breathtaking immediacy."

A reviewer of The New Yorker stated "All in all, it’s a bracing, gratifying reminder of why King is in the pantheon." Milo Miles of NPR commented "One Kind Favor stands alone, however, in reaffirming King's unique power as a star and venerable performer. More than any other icon, King is about the music and not himself. After all, he is large and contains multitudes of blues." Woodrow Wiklins of All About Jazz wrote "King has entertained millions with his albums, concerts and television appearances. He has won several Grammy Awards. Some are on display at his museum, which is built around an old cotton gin building where King worked as a young man. And with this release, the King of Blues has done his fans One Kind Favor."

== Track listing ==
One Kind Favor' track listing
No.	Title	Writer(s)	Length
1.	"See That My Grave Is Kept Clean"	Blind Lemon Jefferson	4:48
2.	"I Get So Weary"	T-Bone Walker	4:14
3.	"Get These Blues Off Me"	Lee Vida Walker	4:28
4.	"How Many More Years"	Chester Burnett	3:06
5.	"Waiting for Your Call"	Oscar Lollie	6:00
6.	"My Love Is Down"	Lonnie Johnson	5:20
7.	"The World Gone Wrong"	Walter Vinson; Lonnie Chatmon	4:19
8.	"Blues Before Sunrise"	Leroy Carr	4:16
9.	"Midnight Blues"	John Willie "Shifty" Henry	3:44
10.	"Backwater Blues"	Big Bill Broonzy	7:33
11.	"Sitting on Top of the World"	Vinson; Chatmon	3:36
12.	"Tomorrow Night"	Lonnie Johnson	5:00

Bonus tracks
No.	Title	Length
13.	"My Baby is Now"	3:37
14.	"Just to Be With You"	4:23
15.	"Haunted House"	3:19

== Personnel ==
- B.B. King - vocals, guitar
- Dr. John - piano
- Nathan East - bass guitar
- Mike Elizondo - bass guitar, double bass
- Jim Keltner - drums, percussion
- Jay Bellerose - drums, percussion
- Snooky Young - trumpet
- Ricky Woodard - tenor sax
- Ernie Fields Jr. - baritone saxophone
- Jeffrey Clayton - alto saxophone
- Neil Larsen - Hammond organ
- Darrell Leonard - trumpet, arranger, horn Arrangements
- Ira Nepus - trombone
- Charles Owens II - tenor saxophone
- Johnny Lee Schell - guitar
