= Now Appearing at Ole Miss =

Live album by B. B. King
- Released: 1980
- Recorded: 1979–1980
- Genre: Blues
- Length: 84:52
- Label: MCA
- Producer: SASCO Productions Inc. (Sidney A. Seidenberg), Electric Lady Studios, Howard Leder

B. B. King chronology
Take It Home (1979)	Now Appearing at Ole Miss (1980)	There Must Be a Better World Somewhere (1981)

Professional ratings
Review scores
Source	Rating
Allmusic	1.5/5 stars

Now Appearing at Ole Miss is a live album by B. B. King, recorded in 1979 and released as a double album on MCA Records in 1980. The live recordings were augmented with overdubs, most notably with percussion instruments. This has been criticized by reviewers as making the album stale, and it is widely regarded as B.B. King's weakest 'live' album. One notable feature, is that the album contains the first use (on a blues recording) of the bass style of playing known as "slap" by Russell Jackson, who would go on to play in the posthumous "B.B. King Experience Band" with another B.B. King band veteran James "Boogaloo" Bolden.

== Track listing ==
Side one

1. "Intro/B.B. King Blues Theme" (Owens) – 3:04
2. "Caldonia" (Fleecie Moore) – 2:47
3. "Blues Medley - 14:10
- a) Don't Answer the Door (Jimmy Johnson)
- b) You Done Lost Your Good Thing Now (Joe Josea)
- c) I Need Love So Bad (Percy Mayfield)
- d) Nobody Loves Me But My Mother" (Riley B. King)

Side two

1. "Hold On (I Think Our Love Is Changing)" (Will Jennings, Joe Sample) – 5:45
2. "I Got Some Outside Help (I Don't Really Need)" (Dave Clark, King) – 5:24
3. "Darlin' You Know I Love You" (Jules Bihari, King) – 7:14

Side three

1. "When I'm Wrong" (King) – 9:29
2. "The Thrill Is Gone" (Rick Darnell, Roy Hawkins) – 11:16

Side four

1. "Never Make a Move Too Soon" (Stix Hooper, Will Jennings) – 7:23
2. "Three O'Clock in the Morning" (Jules Taub) – 8:56
3. "Rock Me Baby" (Joe Josea, King) – 3:52
4. "Guess Who?" (Jesse Belvin) – 2:33
5. "I Just Can't Leave Your Love Alone" (Will Jennings, Joe Sample) – 2:59

== Personnel ==
- B.B. King - vocals, guitar
- Leonard Gill - guitar
- Russell Jackson - bass
- Phil Blackman - keyboards
- Calep Emphrey - drums
- Naná Vasconcelos - percussion
- Hilton C. Joseph - tenor saxophone
- Eddie Synigal - baritone saxophone
- Steve Sherard - trombone
- Lonny LaLanne, Willie Cook - trumpet
- Howie Leder - co-producer, arranger, conductor, mixing
- Calvin Owens - trumpet, musical director
