= Guess Who (B. B. King album) =

Studio album by B. B. King
- Released: 1972
- Genre: Blues
- Length: 43:45
- Label: ABC
- Producer: Joe Zagarino

B. B. King chronology
| L.A. Midnight (1972) | Guess Who (1972) | To Know You Is to Love You (1973) |

Professional ratings
Review scores
| Source | Rating |
|---|---|
| Christgau's Record Guide | B+ |
| The Penguin Guide to Blues Recordings | 2/4 stars |
| The Rolling Stone Jazz Record Guide | 4/5 stars |

Guess Who is a studio album by B. B. King. It was released in 1972 by ABC Records.

As often with King, several of the tracks are re-recordings of songs he had recorded before. "Any Other Way" had appeared with a different arrangement as the b-side of "Help the Poor" in 1964. "Neighborhood Affair" originally dates back to 1953 and was the b-side of "Please Hurry Home". He would re-record the song again in 2003 for the album Reflections. The title track "Guess Who" had appeared on his first ABC album, Mr. Blues, in 1963. It went on to become a live staple, appearing on Now Appearing at Ole Miss, Live at the Apollo and Live at the Royal Albert Hall 2011, among others. "You Shouldn't Have Left" was first recorded in 1959 and released on (The Soul of) B.B. King in 1963. A 1965 recording of "Five Long Years" was first released by Kent on the album The Jungle.

== Track listing ==
1. "Summer in the City" (John Sebastian, Mark Sebastian, Steve Boone) - 3:21
2. "Just Can't Please You" (Jimmy Robins) - 4:30 writer uncredited on original release
3. "Any Other Way" (Clyde Otis) - 4:30
4. "You Don't Know Nothin' About Love" (Jerry Ragovoy) - 4:17
5. "Found What I Need" (Jerry Ragovoy, Jenny Dean) - 2:50
6. "Neighborhood Affair" (Riley King, Jules Taub) - 3:15
7. "It Takes a Young Girl" (Ron Rose & Dave Rouner) - 3:23
8. "Better Lovin' Man" (Hoyt Axton) - 4:40
9. "Guess Who" (Jesse Belvin, JoAnne Belvin) - 4:05
10. "Shouldn't Have Left Me" (Riley King) - 4:00
11. "Five Long Years" (Eddie Boyd) - 5:19

== Personnel ==
- B.B. King - lead guitar, vocals
- Milton Hopkins - lead guitar
- Cornell Dupree - rhythm guitar
- Wilbert Freeman - bass guitar
- Jerry Jemmott - bass guitar
- Ron Levy - piano
- Frank Owens - piano
- V. S. "Sonny" Freeman - drums
- Bernard Purdie - drums
- Joseph Burton - trombone
- Garnett Brown - trombone
- Edward Rowe - trumpet
- Ernie Royal - trumpet
- Steve Madaio - trumpet
- Earl Turbinton - tenor saxophone
- Bobby Forte - tenor saxophone
- Gene Dinwiddie - tenor saxophone
- Trevor Lawrence - tenor saxophone
- Louis Hubert - baritone saxophone
- Howard Johnson - baritone saxophone
- David Sanborn - alto saxophone
- Philip Schwartz, Tom Gamache, Tom Gundelfinger - photography, design
