= The Best of B.B. King =

Greatest hits album by B. B. King
- Released: 1973
- Genre: Blues
- Length: 40:17
- Label: MCA

B. B. King chronology
To Know You Is to Love You (1973)	The Best of B.B. King (1973)	Friends (1974)

The Best of B.B. King is a 1973 compilation album by the American blues guitarist B. B. King.

== Critical reception ==
Professional ratings
Review scores
Source	Rating
AllMusic	4/5 stars
The Encyclopedia of Popular Music	5/5 stars
Christgau's Record Guide	A−
The Rolling Stone Jazz Album Guide	4/5 stars
Tom Hull – On the Web	B+ (***)

Cashbox stated in their review of the album that "The title is a hard promise for deliverance's sake. But the commercial B. B. most of his current fans have come to take as the whole of the man is indeed here" and noted that "The album does address itself to his earlier blues by including live versions of B. B. staples like 'Sweet Sixteen,' but in general, it concentrates on more recent material. Lots of heavy guests, but the real King of the blues knows who he is. And so do we".

== Track listing ==
Side one

1. Hummingbird (Leon Russell) – 4:33
2. Cook County Jail Introduction – 0:37 (Note: Spoken word.)
3. How Blue Can You Get? (Leonard Feather) – 5:08
4. Caldonia (Fleecie Moore) – 3:18
5. Sweet Sixteen (Joe Josea and B. B. King) – 7:01

Side two

1. Ain't Nobody Home (Jerry Ragovoy) – 3:37
2. Why I Sing the Blues (Dave Clark) – 8:37
3. The Thrill Is Gone (Rick Darnell and Roy Hawkins) – 5:25
4. Nobody Loves Me But My Mother – 2:01

== Charts ==
Chart (1973)	Peak position
US Billboard 200	101
US Top R&B/Hip-Hop Albums (Billboard)	28
