= Indianola Mississippi Seeds =

Studio album by B. B. King
- Released: October 1970 (LP); May 1989 (CD)
- Recorded: The Record Plant, Los Angeles, California, May–June 1970 (except track 8 recorded at the Hit Factory, New York City, January 1969)
- Genre: Blues, R&B
- Length: 39:20
- Label: ABC (LP); MCA (CD)
- Producer: Bill Szymczyk

B. B. King chronology
Completely Well (1969)	Indianola Mississippi Seeds (1970)	Live in Cook County Jail (1971)

Indianola Mississippi Seeds is B. B. King's eighteenth studio album. It was released in October 1970 on ABC Records on LP and May 1989 on MCA Records on CD. On this album B. B. King mixed elements of blues and rock music. Producer Bill Szymczyk decided to follow up on the success of the hit "The Thrill Is Gone" by matching King with a musical all-star cast. The result was one of King's most critically acclaimed albums and one of the most highly regarded blues crossover albums of all time.

The album appeared on several of Billboard's album charts in 1970, reaching number 26 on the Pop album chart, number seven on the Jazz album chart and eight on Billboard's listing for "Black Albums." The album also generated several hit singles, "Chains and Things", King's own "Ask Me No Questions" and Leon Russell's "Hummingbird".

King himself, also, views the album as one of his greatest achievements. When asked about his best work, King has said, "I know the critics always mention Live & Well or Live at the Regal, but I think that Indianola Mississippi Seeds was the best album that I've done artistically."

== Background ==
Carole King, Joe Walsh, and Leon Russell participated as guest performers. The opening track, "Nobody Loves Me but My Mother", is a song performed by King as a piano-and-vocal piece. "Hummingbird" originally appeared on Russell's solo album Leon Russell (1970), and on this version Russell is credited with piano and conducting duties.

== Homage paid to a hometown ==
The album title is a tribute to King's upbringing near Indianola, Mississippi. Although King was born on a plantation between two smaller towns, Itta Bena and Berclair, which are actually closer to Greenwood, King has always considered Indianola his hometown.

The album package — which was itself recognized with a Grammy — includes what appears to be a copy of B. B. King's birth certificate with official registration in Indianola. The liner notes also contain a note that reads, "Congratulations Albert and Nora on your son Riley, September 16, 1925."

Over time, King's hometown has paid respects back to him. In 2008, the B.B. King Museum and Delta Interpretive Center opened in Indianola, with the mission to "preserve and share the legacy and values of B. B. King, to celebrate the rich cultural heritage of the Mississippi Delta, and to promote pride, hope, and understanding through exhibitions and educated programs."

== Critical acclaim ==
Professional ratings
Review scores
Source	Rating
AllMusic	4/5 stars
Christgau's Record Guide	B
The Great Rock Discography	7/10
MusicHound Rock	4/5 stars
The Penguin Guide to Blues Recordings	4/4 stars
Rolling Stone	(favorable)
The Rolling Stone Jazz Record Guide	4/5 stars
The Virgin Encyclopedia of Popular Music	4/5 stars

Indianola Mississippi Seeds is one of three of B. B. Kings recordings listed in The Rough Guide to Blues 100 Essential CDs (along with Live at the Regal and Singin' the Blues). The album was named No. 23 on a list of the best "Album Chartmakers by Year" for 1970.

== Track listing ==
All songs written by B. B. King, except where noted.

1. "Nobody Loves Me But My Mother" — 1:26
  - B. B. King — piano & vocal
2. "You're Still My Woman" (B. B. King, Dave Clark) — 6:04
  - B. B. King — guitar & vocal
  - Carole King — piano
  - Bryan Garofalo — bass
  - Russ Kunkel — drums
3. "Ask Me No Questions" — 3:08
  - B. B. King — guitar & vocal
  - Leon Russell – piano
  - Joe Walsh – rhythm guitar
  - Bryan Garofalo — bass
  - Russ Kunkel — drums
4. "Until I'm Dead and Cold" — 4:45
  - B. B. King — guitar & vocal
  - Carole King — piano
  - Bryan Garofalo — bass
  - Russ Kunkel — drums
5. "King's Special" — 5:13
  - B. B. King — lead guitar
  - Leon Russell – piano
  - Joe Walsh – rhythm guitar
  - Bryan Garofalo — bass
  - Russ Kunkel — drums
6. "Ain't Gonna Worry My Life Anymore" — 5:18
  - B. B. King — guitar & vocal
  - Carole King — piano & electric piano
  - Bryan Garofalo — bass
  - Russ Kunkel — drums
7. "Chains and Things" (B. B. King, Dave Clark) — 4:53
  - B.B. King — guitar & vocal
  - Carole King — electric piano
  - Bryan Garofalo — bass
  - Russ Kunkel — drums
8. "Go Underground" (B. B. King, Dave Clark) — 4:00
  - B. B. King — lead guitar & vocal
  - Paul Harris — piano
  - Hugh McCracken — rhythm guitar
  - Jerry Jemmott — bass
  - Herbie Lovelle — drums
  - Joe Zagarino — Engineer
  The Hit Factory, New York City
9. "Hummingbird" (Leon Russell) — 4:36
  - B. B. King — guitar & vocal
  - Leon Russell — piano & conductor
  - Joe Walsh — rhythm guitar
  - Bryan Garofalo — bass
  - Russ Kunkel — drums
  - Sherlie Matthews, Merry Clayton, Clydie King, Venetta Fields — "Angelic chorus"

== Personnel ==
- B.B. King – Guitar, piano, vocals
- Joe Walsh, Hugh McCracken – Guitar
- Carole King – Piano, Fender Rhodes (2,4,6,7)
- Leon Russell – Piano (3,5,9)
- Paul Harris – Piano (8)
- Bryan Garofalo, Jerry Jemmott – Bass guitar
- Russ Kunkel, Herbie Lovelle – Drums
- Bill Szymczyk – producer

Production

- Produced by Bill Szymczyk
- Strings and Horns arranged by Jimmie Haskell
- Recorded at The Record Plant, Los Angeles, California
  - Engineers — Bill Szymczyk & Gary Kellgren
  - Assistant Engineers — Llyllianne Douma (Lillian Davis Douma), Mike D. Stone of the Record Plant, & John Henning
- Mastering — Bob Macleod — Artisan Sound Recorders
- Cover design — Robert Lockart
- Photography — Ivan Nagy

== Charts ==
=== Album charts ===
year	chart	peak
1970	Billboard Black Albums	8
1970	Billboard Jazz Albums	7
1970	Billboard Pop Albums	26

=== Singles ===
year	Singles	chart	peak
1970	"Chains And Things"	Billboard Black Singles	6
1970	"Chains And Things"	Billboard Pop Singles	45
1970	"Hummingbird"	Billboard Black Singles	25
1970	"Hummingbird"	Billboard Pop Singles	48
1971	"Ask Me No Questions"	Billboard Black Singles	18
1971	"Ask Me No Questions"	Billboard Pop Singles	40

== Awards ==
Photographer, Ivan Nagy and cover designer, Robert Lockart won the 1971 Grammy for "Best Album Package - Incl. Album Cover, Graphic Arts, Photography" for Indianola Mississippi Seeds.

== Releases ==
year	format	label	catalog #
1970	LP	ABC	713
1989	CD	MCA	MCAD-31343
1989	CS	MCA	MCAC-31343
1995	CD	Beat Goes On	237
2002	CD	Beat Goes On	237

== See also ==
- B. B. King discography
