= Love Me Tender (B. B. King album) =

Studio album by B.B. King
- Released: 1982
- Studios: Music City Music Hall (Nashville, Tennessee)
- Genre: Blues
- Label: MCA
- Producer: Stewart Levine

B.B. King chronology
There Must Be a Better World Somewhere (1981)	Love Me Tender (1982)	Blues 'N' Jazz (1983)

Love Me Tender is a studio album by the American blues musician B.B. King. It was released via MCA Records in 1982. King supported the album by appearing on Austin City Limits.

The album peaked at No. 179 on the Billboard 200.

== Production ==
Produced by Stewart Levine, the album was recorded in Nashville. The Muscle Shoals Horns appear on some tracks. "Love Me Tender" is a cover of the song made famous by Elvis Presley; King was Presley's favorite blues musician.

== Critical reception ==
Professional ratings
Review scores
Source	Rating
AllMusic	1.5/5 stars
The Encyclopedia of Popular Music	2/5 stars
MusicHound Rock: The Essential Album Guide	2.5/5 stars
The Rolling Stone Album Guide	4/5 stars

The New York Times panned the first side of Love Me Tender, calling it "bland, countrypolitan elevator music," but thought more highly of side two's "first-rate after-hours blues." The Globe and Mail wrote that "the singing is lugubrious, the playing is by rote, and the sound is so lush that King can barely be heard above it."

AllMusic called the album an "extremely ill-advised foray into mushy Nashville cornpone." The Rolling Stone Album Guide considered it a return to the "gentle sound" of Midnight Believer.

== Track listing ==
No.	Title	Length
1.	"One of Those Nights"	4:58
2.	"Love Me Tender"	3:28
3.	"Don't Change on Me"	4:35
4.	"(I'd Be) A Legend in My Time"	2:52
5.	"You've Always Got the Blues"	4:57
6.	"Nightlife / Please Send Me Someone to Love"	4:30
7.	"You and Me, Me and You"	3:05
8.	"Since I Met You Baby"	4:30
9.	"Time Is a Thief"	5:26
10.	"A World I Never Made"	5:13
