= Irving Ashby =

American jazz guitarist (1920–1987)

- Born: Irving Conrad Ashby; December 29, 1920; Somerville, Massachusetts, U.S.
- Died: April 22, 1987 (aged 66) Perris, California
- Genres: Jazz, swing
- Occupation: Musician
- Instrument: Guitar

Irving Conrad Ashby (December 29, 1920 – April 22, 1987) was an American jazz guitarist.

Ashby was born in Somerville, Massachusetts and started playing guitar when he was nine. His career started in 1940 when he became a member of Lionel Hampton's band, and he played on Hampton's hit "Flying Home". In 1947, he took over for Oscar Moore in the Nat King Cole Trio.

He then briefly replaced Charlie Smith, a drummer, in the Oscar Peterson Trio, producing a line-up (piano, guitar, bass) similar to the Cole Trio's; the substitution of a guitarist for a drummer continued until 1958. After leaving the Peterson Trio, Ashby concentrated on session work, which included recording with Norman Granz, Sheb Wooley, LaVern Baker, Howard Roberts, B.B. King, Louis Jordan, and Pat Boone. In addition to guitar, Ashby played the upright bass. Ashby died in April 1987 in Perris, California, at the age of 66.

== Discography ==
- Memoirs (Accent, 1977)

=== As sideman ===
With Nat King Cole

- 1947 Volume 3 (Classics, 2000)
- 1947–1949 (Classics, 2000)
- 1949 (Classics, 2001)
- 1949–1950 (Classics, 2003)
- The Instrumental Classics (Capitol, 1992)

With others

- Chan Romero, Hippy Hippy Shake (Del-Fi, 1959)
- Count Basie, Basie Jam (Pablo, 1975)
- Jackie Davis, Big Beat Hammond (Capitol, 1962)
- Ernie Freeman, Ernie Freeman Plays Irving Berlin (Imperial, 1956)
- Erroll Garner, Trio (Dreyfus, 2018)
- Billie Holiday, Lady Sings the Blues (Verve, 1956)
- Illinois Jacquet, Illinois Jacquet and His Orchestra (Clef, 1957)
- Louis Jordan, Man, We're Wailin' (Mercury, 1958)
- Meade Lux Lewis, Alternate Takes, Live Performances, Soundies, Etc. (Document, 2005)
- Mundell Lowe, California Guitar (Famous Door 1973)
- B. B. King, Lucille (Bluesway, 1968)
- Amos Milburn, Chicken Shack Boogie (United Artists, 1978)
- Charlie Parker, Bird: The Complete Charlie Parker on Verve (Verve, 1988)
- Oscar Peterson, The History of an Artist (Pablo, 1974)
- Perez Prado, Prez (RCA Victor, 1958)
- Andre Previn, Previn at Sunset (Black Lion, 1972)
- Lou Rawls, Black and Blue and Tobacco Road (Capitol, 2006)
- Fats Waller, Original Sessions 1943 (Musidisc, 1975)
- Lester Young, The Complete Aladdin Recordings of Lester Young (Blue Note, 1995)
