= I Ain't from Chicago =

Studio album by Jimmy Reed
- Released: 1973
- Recorded: June 17, 20 & 24, 1971
- Studio: RCA Studios, Chicago, IL
- Genre: Blues
- Length: 31:43
- Label: BluesWay; BLS 6054
- Producer: Al Smith

Jimmy Reed chronology
Jimmy Reed Is Back (1971)	I Ain't from Chicago (1973)	Blues Is My Business (1974)

I Ain't from Chicago is an album by blues musician Jimmy Reed released by the BluesWay label in 1973.

Professional ratings
Review scores
Source	Rating
AllMusic	3/5 stars

== Track listing ==
All compositions credited to Jimmy Reed except where noted

1. "World's Got a Problem" (Al Smith) − 3:10
2. "I Don't Know (Part 1)" (Al Smith, Jimmy Reed, Mary Lee Reed) − 2:30
3. "I Don't Know (Part 2)" (Smith, Reed, Reed) − 1:55
4. "Got to Be a Reason" − 2:55
5. "Take Out Some Insurance" − 2:31
6. "I Don't Believe in Nothing" (D. Sanders) − 3:00
7. "If You Want It Done Right" (Johnnie Mae Dunson) − 2:57
8. "Life Won't Last Me Long" (Dunson) − 2:30
9. "Turn Me On" (Sanders) − 3:30
10. "Got Me Worried" (Sanders) − 3:30
11. "I Ain't from Chicago" (Reed, Smith) − 3:15

== Personnel ==
- Jimmy Reed – guitar, vocals, harmonica
- Unidentified musicians – guitar, bass, drums
