= BluesWay Records =

Record label

- Founded: 1966
- Founder: Bob Thiele
- Country of origin: United States

BluesWay Records was an American subsidiary label of ABC-Paramount Records, begun by Bob Thiele in 1966. Artists such as John Lee Hooker, Jimmy Reed, Jimmy Rushing, Otis Spann, and T-Bone Walker were among those who signed for the label. BluesWay released B. B. King's 1969 Live and Well and Completely Well albums, the latter containing his hit "The Thrill is Gone". The label also released the James Gang's first album, 1969's Yer' Album.

BluesWay ceased operations in 1970, with Hooker, King and James Gang being transferred to the parent ABC Records label. The imprint was briefly revived in 1973–74. The BluesWay masters, along with the rest of ABC Records' assets, were sold to MCA Records in 1978.

== Discography ==
BluesWay Records released albums from 1967 until 1974.

Catalog No. (BL/BLS)	Album	Artist	Details
6001	Blues Is King	B. B. King	
6002	Live at Cafe Au Go Go	John Lee Hooker	
6003	The Blues Is Where It's At	Otis Spann	
6004	The New Jimmy Reed Album	Jimmy Reed	
6005	Every Day I Have the Blues	Jimmy Rushing with Oliver Nelson and his Orchestra	
6006	Singing the Blues	Joe Turner	
6007	Cherry Red	Eddie "Cleanhead" Vinson	
6008	Stormy Monday Blues	T-Bone Walker	
6009	Soulin'	Jimmy Reed	
6010	Dirty Blues Band	Dirty Blues Band	
6011	Blues on Top of Blues	B. B. King	
6012	Urban Blues	John Lee Hooker	
6013	The Bottom of the Blues	Otis Spann	
6014	Funky Town	T-Bone Walker	
6015	Big Boss Man	Jimmy Reed	
6016	Lucille	B. B. King	
6017	Livin' the Blues	Jimmy Rushing	
6018	The Soul of Bonnie and Clyde	South Central Avenue Municipal Blues Band	
6019	The Blues Are All Brown	Roy Brown	
6020	Stone Dirt	The Dirty Blues Band featuring Rod "Gingerman" Piazza	
6021	The Outlaw Blues Band	The Outlaw Blues Band	
6022	His Best – The Electric B. B. King	B. B. King	Compilation of ABC and BluesWay recordings
6023	Simply the Truth	John Lee Hooker	
6024	Down in Virginia	Jimmy Reed	
6026	The Blues Singer	Jimmy Witherspoon	
6028	A Long Way from Home	Brownie McGhee and Sonny Terry	
6029	George Smith of the Blues	George "Harmonica" Smith and his Blues Band	
6030	Breaking In	The Outlaw Blues Band	
6031	Live & Well	B. B. King	
6032	Don't Have to Worry	Earl Hooker	
6034	Yer' Album	The James Gang	
6036	Rambling Woman	Johnny "Big Moose" Walker featuring Earl Hooker and Otis Hale	
6037	Completely Well	B. B. King	
6038	If You Miss 'Im...I Got 'Im	John Lee Hooker featuring Earl Hooker	
6039	Legend	Charles Brown	
6040	Hunh!	Jimmy Witherspoon	
6043	Time to Get It Together	Country Coalition	
6050	Back In the Alley	B. B. King	Compilation of ABC and BluesWay recordings
6051	The Best of Jimmy Witherspoon	Jimmy Witherspoon	
6052	Kabuki Wuki	John Lee Hooker	
6053	The Genius Live in Concert	Ray Charles	Reissue of ABC/ABCS 500
6054	I Ain't from Chicago	Jimmy Reed	
6055	Farther On Down the Road	Andrew "Voice" Odom	
6056	Hard Times: The Classic Blues of Roy Brown	Roy Brown	
6057	Sent for You Yesterday	Jimmy Rushing	
6058	Dirty Mistreater	T-Bone Walker	Compilation of tracks from 6008 and 6014
6059	I Couldn't Believe My Eyes	Brownie McGhee and Sonny Terry with Earl Hooker	
6060	Roll 'Em	Joe Turner	Reissue of Bluesway BLS 6006
6061	Blues Classics Volume 1	Various Artists	
6062	Blues Classics Volume 2	Various Artists	
6063	Heart Loaded with Trouble	Otis Spann	
6064	18 Pounds of Uncleaned Chittlins and Other Greasy Blues Specialities	Mel Brown	Compilation
6065	Call on Me	Bobby Bland	Reissue of Duke DLP 77
6066	Sometimes Tomorrow My Broken Heart Will Die	Junior Parker	
6067	The Ultimate Jimmy Reed	Jimmy Reed	
6068	Sunnyland Slim Plays Ragtime Blues	Sunnyland Slim	
6069	Funky from Chicago	Johnny Little John	
6070	Cry Before I Go	Lucille Spann	
6071	Ain't Sick No More	Homesick James	
6072	Do You Remember the Great Earl Hooker	Earl Hooker	Recorded 1966
6073	Jimmy Reed at Carnegie Hall	Jimmy Reed	Reissue of Vee-Jay 1035
6074	After 21 Years	Reverend Gatemouth Moore	
6075	I Can't Keep My Foot from Jumping	Johnny Young	
6076	Do It If You Want To	Snooky Pryor	
6077	Dirty Double Mother	Roosevelt Sykes	
6078	Cousin Joe Of New Orleans	Cousin Joe	
6079	Last Night	Carey Bell	
6080	Don't Your Plums Look Mellow Hanging on Your Tree	Big Joe Williams	
6081	Hand of God	The Spencer Jackson Family	
6082	House Cleanin' Blues	L. C. Robinson	
6083	Lonely Girl	Lee Jackson	

== See also ==
- List of record labels
