= Blues Is King =

Live album by B.B. King
- Released: 1967
- Recorded: November 5, 1966
- Venue: International Club, Chicago
- Genre: Blues
- Length: 40:27
- Label: BluesWay
- Producer: Johnny Pate, Louis Zito

B.B. King chronology
| Confessin' the Blues (1966) | Blues Is King (1967) | Blues on Top of Blues (1968) |

Blues Is King is a live album by blues musician, B.B. King recorded in Chicago in 1966 and released by the BluesWay label in 1967.

== Critical reception ==
Professional ratings
Review scores
| Source | Rating |
|---|---|
| AllMusic | 4/5 stars |
| The Penguin Guide to Blues Recordings | 3.5/4 stars |
| The Rolling Stone Jazz Record Guide | 4/5 stars |

A staff review by AllMusic commented:

By 1967, King had refined his singing and guitar style to a fine point. What was just beginning to emerge during this period was King the showman, the singer with a story to tell his audience and nowhere was this more apparent than in his live performances. Here he's captured in concert in Chicago with his impassioned vocals and characteristically stinging guitar. The effect is both cathartic and awe-inspiring.

The album title influenced the Marshall Crenshaw song of the same name.

== Track listing ==
Details are taken from the original BluesWay LP and may differ from other sources.

Side one

1. "Waitin' on You" (B.B. King, Ferdinand Washington) – 2:23
2. "Gambler's Blues" (arr. by B.B. King, J. Pate) – 4:38
3. "Tired of Your Jive" (Janet Despenza, Johnny Pate) – 3:30
4. "Night Life" (Willie Nelson) – 4:45
5. "Buzz Me" (Danny Baxter, Fleecie Moore) – 4:05

Side two

1. "Don't Answer the Door" (Jimmy Johnson) – 4:00
2. "Blind Love" (B.B. King, Joe Josea) – 3:25
3. "I Know What You're Puttin' Down" (Buddy Allen, Louis Jordan) – 3:30
4. "Baby Get Lost" (Billy Moore) – 3:57
5. "Gonna Keep on Loving You" (B.B. King) – 3:45

Bonus tracks on 1992 See For Miles CD Blues is King... Plus

1. "Sweet Sixteen (Part One)" – 3:27
2. "Sweet Sixteen (Part Two)" – 2:48

Taken from the BluesWay single 45-61012.

Bonus tracks on 2012 and 2015 Japanese CD reissues

1. "Goin' Down Slow" – 6:33
2. "Sweet Sixteen (Complete Version)" – 6:10

"Goin' Down Slow" and the reconstructed full version of "Sweet Sixteen" were previously issued on the King of the Blues box set, and come from the same live performance as the Blues is King album. (An edit of the recording without the opening guitar solo and the ending was released on the compilation His Best – The Electric B. B. King. For the box set, the master of this version was combined with a vinyl rip of the original BluesWay single.)

== Personnel ==
- B.B. King – guitar, vocals
- Kenneth Sands – trumpet
- Bobby Forte – tenor saxophone
- Duke Jethro – organ
- Louis Satterfield – bass
- Sonny Freeman – drums
