= Completely Well =

Studio album by B.B. King
- Released: December 5, 1969
- Recorded: June 24–25, 1969
- Studios: Hit Factory, New York City
- Genres: Blues, R&B, soul
- Length: 49:57
- Label: BluesWay
- Producer: Bill Szymczyk

B.B. King chronology
| Live & Well (1969) | Completely Well (1969) | Indianola Mississippi Seeds (1970) |

Completely Well is a 1969 studio album by blues guitarist B. B. King. It is notable for the inclusion of "The Thrill Is Gone", which became a hit on both the R&B/soul and pop charts and which earned him a Grammy Award for Best Male R&B Vocal Performance in 1970.

The album was released in the US as an LP record in 1969 and as a CD in 1987; in the UK only as an LP. San Francisco critic Ralph J. Gleason's liner notes are mostly a profile of King, with only a passing reference to the actual music contained in King`s commercial breakthrough album.

== Background ==
Completely Well was recorded in June 1969 at The Hit Factory in New York City and produced by Bill Szymczyk. Jerry Jemmott on bass, Herbie Lovelle on drums, Paul Harris on keyboards, and Hugh McCracken on guitar provided instrumental backing for King's vocals and guitar.

The track "The Thrill Is Gone" is a reinterpretation of a song originally released by Roy Hawkins in the early 1950s. The album's version features a string arrangement added at the suggestion of producer Szymczyk. The song became a major hit and one of King's signature songs, winning the Grammy Award for Best Male R&B Vocal Performance at the 13th Annual Grammy Awards in 1971. King later re-recorded the song as a duet with Tracy Chapman for his 1997 album Deuces Wild.

Completely Well is regarded as an album that helped introduce B.B. King to a wider audience, alongside the success of "The Thrill Is Gone".

== Reception ==
Professional ratings
Review scores
| Source | Rating |
|---|---|
| AllMusic | 4/5 stars |
| The Penguin Guide to Blues Recordings | 2.5/4 stars |
| The Rolling Stone Jazz Record Guide | 4/5 stars |

On the Billboard 200 chart, the album reached a peak position of number 38 on April 4, 1970, becoming King's first Top 40 album in the United States. It also climbed to number 5 on Billboard's R&B albums chart, marking his first Top 10 entry on that chart in about five years since Live at the Regal (1965).

The single "The Thrill Is Gone" from the album became his highest-charting song on the Billboard Hot 100, reaching number 15, and it rose to number 3 on Billboard's R&B singles chart. The follow-up single "So Excited" reached number 54 on the Hot 100 and number 14 on the R&B chart.

== Track listing ==
1. "So Excited" (B.B. King, Gerald Jemmott) -- 5:34
2. "No Good" (Ferdinand Washington, B.B. King) -- 4:35
3. "You're Losin' Me" (Ferdinand Washington, B.B. King) -- 4:54
4. "What Happened" (B.B. King) -- 4:41
5. "Confessin' the Blues" (Jay McShann, Walter Brown) -- 4:56
6. "Key to My Kingdom" (Maxwell Davis, Joe Josea, Claude Baum) -- 3:18
7. "Cryin' Won't Help You Now" (Sam Ling, Jules Taub; LP has only B.B.) -- 6:30
8. "You're Mean" (B.B. King, Gerald Jemmott, Hugh McCracken, Paul Harris, Herbie Lovelle) -- 9:39
9. "The Thrill Is Gone" (Rick Darnell, Roy Hawkins; LP has Arthur H [Art] Benson, Dale Pettite) -- 5:30

== Personnel ==
- B.B. King: Vocals, lead guitar
- Hugh McCracken: Rhythm guitar
- Paul Harris: organ, acoustic and Wurlitzer electric piano
- Jerry Jemmott: Bass
- Herbie Lovelle: Drums
- Bert "Super Charts" DeCoteaux: string and horn arrangements
