= Blues 'N' Jazz =

Studio album by B.B. King
- Released: 1983
- Recorded: M. & I. Recording, New York City and Rivendale Recorders, Pasadena, Texas
- Genre: Blues
- Label: MCA
- Producer: Sidney A. Seidenberg

B.B. King chronology
Love Me Tender (1982)	Blues 'N' Jazz (1983)	Better Than Ever (1984)

Blues 'N' Jazz is the 29th album by B.B. King released in 1983. It was recorded on his 58th birthday, September 16, 1983.

== Background ==
Writing in the album sleeve-notes, producer Sid Seidenberg says: "Recording his forty-first album on his birthday in New York was a highlight of B.B.'s career. Returning from one of his most successful tours, in Europe where he played at most of the continent's jazz festivals. B.B. King went into the studio with 'his friends' from Blues and Jazz and began to express himself."

Jazz musicians such as Arnett Cobb, Warren Chiasson (a vibraphonist known for his work with George Shearing and Chet Baker), and Woody Shaw participated on the album. According to Chiasson, the album cover features a photograph of the birthday cake that was brought out after the recording sessions.

== Reception ==
Professional ratings
Review scores
Source	Rating
AllMusic	3/5 stars

In the United States, the album entered the Billboard 200 chart for four weeks, reaching a peak position of 172 on the chart dated July 23, 1983. It also reached number 38 on Billboard's R&B Albums chart.

Eugene Chadbourne of AllMusic gave the album 3 out of 5 stars, describing it as "a superb document of King's big band in the 1980s, perfectly enhanced by the choice of guest stars." At the 26th Annual Grammy Awards, the album won the Grammy Award for Best Traditional Blues Recording, marking King's third Grammy win.

== Track listing ==
Side one
No.	Title	Length
1.	"Inflation Blues" (Louis Jordan, Allegretto Alexander, Tommy Southern)	4.12
2.	"Broken Heart" (B.B. King)	2.43
3.	"Sell My Monkey" (B.B. King)	3.02
4.	"Heed My Warning" (Louis Jordan, Howard Bowman)	5:05
5.	"Teardrops from My Eyes" (Rudolph Toombs)	4.59

Side two
No.	Title	Length
6.	"Rainbow Riot" (Andy Gibson, Angelyn Carlington)	3.37
7.	"Darlin' You Know I Love You" (Jules Bihari, Riley B. King)	4.44
8.	"Make Love to Me" (Bill Norvas, Alan Copeland, Paul Mares, Ben Pollack, Mel Stitzel, Walter Melrose)	4:27
9.	"I Can't Let You Go" (B.B. King)	3.48

== Personnel ==
=== Musicians ===
- B.B. King – vocals, guitar
- Harold Austin, Donald A. Wilkerson – saxophone
- William "Billy" Butler – guitar
- Warren Chiasson – vibraphone
- Arnett Cobb, Fred Ford – tenor saxophone
- Lloyd Glenn – piano
- Major Quincey Holley Jr. – bass guitar
- Oliver Jackson – drums
- John J. Longo Sr., James Bolden, Calvin Owens, Woody Shaw – trumpet
- Edgar Synigal Jr. – baritone saxophone

=== Technical ===
- Sidney A. Seidenberg – producer
- Calvin Owens – arranger
- Peter Darmi – engineer
- Doug Grama – assistant engineer
- Bill Kipper – mastering
- Kathe Schreyer – art director and designer
- Timothy Eames – birthday cake
- Larry DuPont – photographer
