= King Size (B. B. King album) =

Studio album by B. B. King
- Released: 1977
- Genre: Blues
- Label: ABC
- Producer: Esmond Edwards

B. B. King chronology
Bobby Bland and B.B. King Together Again...Live (1976)	King Size (1977)	Midnight Believer (1978)

Professional ratings
Review scores
Source	Rating
AllMusic	3/5 stars
Christgau's Record Guide	B−
The Rolling Stone Jazz Record Guide	4/5 stars

King Size is a studio album by the American musician B. B. King, released in 1977.

== Track listing ==
Side A

1. "Don't You Lie to Me" (Hudson Whittaker)
2. "I Wonder Why" (Billy Preston, George Johnson)
3. "I Just Want to Make Love to You (Willie Dixon) / Your Lovin' Turns Me On" (Riley King, E. Edwards)
4. "Slow and Easy" (Earl Randle)

Side B

1. "Got My Mojo Working" (Preston Foster)
2. "Walkin' in the Sun" (Jeff Barry)
3. "Mother Fuyer" (Traditional; arranged by Riley King)
4. "The Same Love That Made Me Laugh" (Bill Withers)
5. "It's Just a Matter of Time" (Brook Benton, Clyde Otis, Belford Hendricks)

== Personnel ==
- B.B. King – guitar, vocals
- Lee Ritenour, Milton Hopkins, Charles Julian Fearing – guitar
- Joe Turner, Scott Edwards Jr. – bass guitar
- Sonny Burke – piano, synthesizer
- James Toney, Ronnie Barron – Hammond organ
- Ed Greene, John "Jabo" Starks – drums
- Earl Nash, Eddie "Bongo" Brown – percussion, congas
- Jimmy Forrest – tenor saxophone
- Fred Jackson Jr. – tenor saxophone, flute
- Ernie Watts – alto saxophone
- Jerome Richardson – baritone saxophone
- Garnett Brown – trombone
- Al Aarons, Bobby Bryant, Roy Poper – trumpet
- Nils Oliver, Ron Cooper – cello
- Paul Polivnick, Rollice Dale – viola
- Charles Veal Jr., Haim Shtrum, Harris Goldman, Janice Gower, Kathleen Lenski, Bill Henderson – violin
- Charles Veal Jr. – concertmaster
- Johnny Pate – horn and string conductor and arranger
- Garnett Brown – horn and string conductor and arranger on "Slow and Easy"
