= Riding with the King (B. B. King and Eric Clapton album) =

2000 studio album by B.B. King and Eric Clapton

Studio album by B.B. King and Eric Clapton
- Released: June 12, 2000
- Recorded: The Town House (London); Ocean Way Recording (Los Angeles)
- Genres: Blues, blues rock
- Length: 61:13
- Label: Duck/Reprise
- Producers: Eric Clapton, Simon Climie

B.B. King chronology
Let the Good Times Roll (1999)	Riding with the King (2000)	Makin' Love Is Good for You (2000)

Eric Clapton chronology
Clapton Chronicles: The Best of Eric Clapton (1999)	Riding with the King (2000)	Reptile (2001)

Riding with the King is a collaborative album by B.B. King and Eric Clapton that was released in 2000. It was their first collaborative album and won the 2001 Grammy Award for Best Traditional Blues Album. The album reached number one on Billboard's Top Blues Albums and was certified 2× Platinum in the United States. Riding with the King was also released on a DVD-Audio in higher resolution and with a 5.1 surround sound mix in 2000.

The album was generally well received by reviewers, although some felt that it could have been better, and that the sound on the CD was too polished for a blues album.

== Background ==
Riding with the King was the first collaborative album by Eric Clapton and B.B. King. They performed together for the first time at Cafe Au Go Go in New York City in 1967 when Clapton was 22 and a member of Cream, but did not record together until 1997 when King collaborated with Clapton on the song "Rock Me Baby" for his duets album, Deuces Wild. Clapton looked up to King and had always wanted to make an album with him. King said they had discussed the project often, and added: "I admire the man. I think he's No. 1 in rock 'n' roll as a guitarist and No. 1 as a great person." At the time of recording Riding with the King, Clapton was 55 and King 74.

Clapton initiated the recording sessions for Riding with the King and included some of his regular session musicians on the album. He also chose the songs and co-produced the album with Simon Climie, who had previously worked on several of Clapton's albums. While this would appear to be a Clapton album recorded with King, Clapton gave center-stage to King, who took the lead on many of the songs with his singing and his solos.

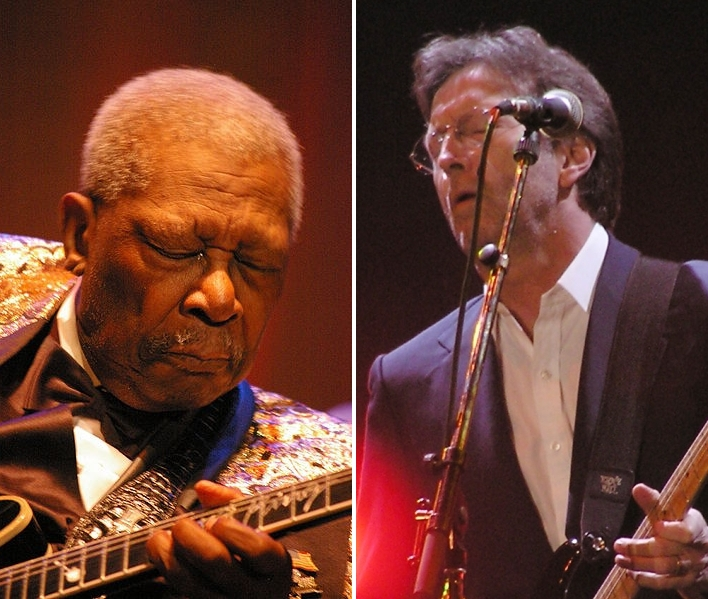
B.B. King (2009) and Eric Clapton (2005)

== Content ==
The album contains five "vintage" King songs from the 1950s and 1960s: "Ten Long Years", "Three O'Clock Blues", "Help the Poor", "Days of Old" and "When My Heart Beats Like a Hammer". Other standards include the Big Bill Broonzy-penned "Key to the Highway" (which Clapton had recorded in the early 1970s with Derek and the Dominos), Chicago pianist Maceo Merriweather's "Worried Life Blues", a cover of Isaac Hayes's composition "Hold On, I'm Comin'" originally a 1966 single for Sam & Dave, and "Come Rain or Come Shine" from the 1946 musical St. Louis Woman. Two of the songs, "I Wanna Be" and "Marry You", previously appeared on guitarist Doyle Bramhall II's 1999 solo album, Jellycream. The album's title track, "Riding with the King", is a John Hiatt composition that came about when producer Scott Mathews recounted to Hiatt a strange and abstract dream he had of flying on an airplane with Elvis Presley. It is also the title track of Hiatt's 1983 album of the same name that Mathews co-produced. The balance of the tracks were written especially for the album.

The tracks are a mixture of acoustic ("Worried Life Blues") and electric songs ("Three O'Clock Blues"), and vary from slow numbers ("Ten Long Years") to "mid-tempo stomps" ("Help the Poor").

The cover shows Clapton driving King around in a vintage Cadillac convertible: it was on sale at the time and Clapton noticed it. The shot was taken by Robert Sebree from a camera truck with a two-seat jib while Clapton drove around the Warner Brothers Pictures backlot.

== Reception ==
Professional ratings
Review scores
Source	Rating
AllMusic	4/5 stars
Entertainment Weekly	A
The Spokesman-Review	Mixed
The Penguin Guide to Blues Recordings	3/4 stars

William Ruhlmann at AllMusic noted that Riding with the King is more about King than Clapton, and that Clapton's role on the album is more of a "supportive" one. He also noted that aside from King and Clapton's guitar, there are often two or three additional guitarists on each track. Ruhlmann said that the result is "effective", but "never really stunning". Dan Moos at PopMatters described the album as a "strong blues cocktail [...] with one part Mr. Clapton slickness mixed with three parts of Mr. King’s blues stature." Steve Futterman at Entertainment Weekly called the "father" and "son" collaboration "triumphant". Louis Gerber wrote in Cosmopolis that Riding with the King "goes directly to the heart and soul" and is a "refreshing and sensational album, the best in the popular music genre since the release of Santana's Supernatural".

Dave Ferman wrote in the Mobile Register that while the album was a "great idea well-executed", it is not as good as it could have been. Ferman complained that, in his opinion, Clapton has never been a very good blues vocalist, that Joe Sample's keyboards were far too prominent in the mix, and that the CD sounded too "squeaky-clean, ... antiseptic and clinical" for a blues album.

Nicole Bode wrote in the Columbia Daily Spectator that on the album, King takes Clapton "deeper into blues territory than he has ever gone alone". She said that King's presence draws out a "raw, growling" side of Clapton's voice that will surprise most Clapton fans. She was particularly complimentary of "Come Rain or Come Shine", on which she said King uses "a mournful vibrato so tender it almost breaks your heart". Bode also liked the call and response guitar and vocal duet of Clapton and King on "Hold On, I'm Comin'", although she did add that Clapton's vocals are not of the same calibre as King's.

Riding with the King peaked at number one on the Billboard Top Blues Albums in 2000, and was certified 2× Multi-Platinum in the United States. The album also won a Grammy Award for Best Traditional Blues Album in 2000.

== Track listing ==
No.	Title	Writer(s)	Length
1.	"Riding with the King"	John Hiatt	4:23
2.	"Ten Long Years"	Jules Taub, B.B. King	4:40
3.	"Key to the Highway"	Big Bill Broonzy, Charlie Segar	3:39
4.	"Marry You"	Doyle Bramhall II, Susannah Melvoin, Craig Ross	4:59
5.	"Three O'Clock Blues"	Lowell Fulson	8:36
6.	"Help the Poor"	Charles Singleton	5:06
7.	"I Wanna Be"	Doyle Bramhall II, Charlie Sexton	4:45
8.	"Worried Life Blues"	Sam Hopkins, Big Maceo Merriweather	4:25
9.	"Days of Old"	Jules Taub, B.B. King	3:00
10.	"When My Heart Beats Like a Hammer"	B.B. King, Jules Taub	7:09
11.	"Hold On, I'm Comin'"	Isaac Hayes, David Porter	6:20
12.	"Come Rain or Come Shine"	Harold Arlen, Johnny Mercer	4:11

A 20th Anniversary reissue of the album was released on June 26, 2020. The reissue featured two previously unreleased tracks, "Rollin' and Tumblin'", the video of which was released on Clapton's YouTube channel on May 21, 2020, and a cover of “Let Me Love You Baby” written by Willie Dixon.

== Personnel ==
=== Main personnel ===
- B.B. King – guitar, co-lead vocals
- Eric Clapton – guitar, co-lead vocals (tracks 1, 3–9, 11, 12)
- Doyle Bramhall II – guitar (tracks 1, 2, 4, 6, 7, 9–12), background vocals (tracks 4, 7)
- Andy Fairweather Low – guitar (tracks 1, 2, 4, 6, 7, 9–12)
- Jimmie Vaughan – guitar (track 6)
- Joe Sample – acoustic piano (1, 2, 5, 9–11), Wurlitzer (tracks 1, 7, 11), Rhodes (6)
- Tim Carmon – organ (tracks 1–7, 9–12)
- Paul Waller – drum programming (tracks 1–4, 7–12)
- Nathan East – bass
- Steve Gadd – drums
- Arif Mardin – string arrangement (track 12)
- Susannah Melvoin – background vocals (tracks 1, 4, 6, 7, 9, 11, 12)
- Wendy Melvoin – background vocals (tracks 1, 4, 6, 7, 9, 11, 12)

Source: Discogs

=== Production and artwork ===
- Alan Douglas – engineer, mixer (tracks 2, 3, 5, 8–11)
- Tom Sweeney – engineering assistant
- Mick Guzauski – mixer (tracks 1, 4, 6, 7, 12)
- Eric Clapton – producer
- Simon Climie – producer
- Robert Sebree – artwork photography
- Don Paulsen – artwork photography
- Wherefore Art? – artwork design
- Stephen Walker – artwork direction

Source: Discogs

== Accolades ==
=== Grammy Awards ===
Year	Nominee / work	Award	Result
2001	Riding with the King	Grammy Award for Best Traditional Blues Album	Won

== Chart performance ==
=== Weekly charts ===
Chart (2000–2020)	Peak position
Australian Albums (ARIA)	5
Australian Jazz/Blues Albums (ARIA)	1
Austrian Albums (Ö3 Austria)	3
Belgian Albums (Ultratop Flanders)	26
Belgian Albums (Ultratop Wallonia)	17
Canadian Albums (Billboard)	13
Canadian Top Albums (The Record)	13
Canadian Top Albums/CDs (RPM)	4
Danish Albums (Hitlisten)	2
Dutch Albums (Album Top 100)	6
European Albums (Billboard)	6
Finnish Albums (Suomen virallinen lista)	11
French Albums (SNEP)	11
German Albums (Offizielle Top 100)	2
Hungarian Albums (MAHASZ)	12
Irish Albums (IRMA)	69
Italian Albums (FIMI)	4
Japanese Albums (Oricon)	4
New Zealand Albums (RMNZ)	2
Norwegian Albums (VG-lista)	1
Scottish Albums (Official Charts)	16
South Korean International Albums (Circle)	65
Spanish Albums (AFYVE)	10
Swedish Albums (Sverigetopplistan)	8
Swiss Albums (Schweizer Hitparade)	3
UK Albums (Official Charts)	15
US Billboard 200	3
US Top Blues Albums (Billboard)	1
US Top Catalog Albums (Billboard)	41
US Top Internet Albums (Billboard)	1

=== Year-end charts ===
Chart (2000)	Position
Australian Albums (ARIA)	67
Austrian Albums (Ö3 Austria)	30
Belgian Albums (Ultratop Flanders)	103
Belgian Albums (Ultratop Wallonia)	99
Canada Top Albums/CDs (RPM)	96
Canadian Albums (Nielsen SoundScan)	76
Dutch Albums (MegaCharts)	51
European Albums (Music & Media)	17
Finnish Albums (Suomen virallinen lista)	72
French Albums (SNEP)	96
German Albums Chart	33
Japanese Albums (Oricon)	97
New Zealand Albums (RMNZ)	23
Norwegian Albums (VG-lista)	10
Swiss Albums (Schweizer Hitparade)	47
UK Albums (OCC)	65
US Billboard 200	52

Chart (2001)	Position
Australian Blues/Jazz Albums (ARIA)	5

== Certifications ==
Region	Certification	Certified units/sales
Argentina (CAPIF)	Gold	30,000^{^}
Australia (ARIA)	Platinum	70,000^{^}
Austria (IFPI Austria)	Gold	25,000^{*}
Brazil (Pro-Música Brasil)	Gold	100,000^{*}
Canada (Music Canada)	Platinum	100,000^{^}
Denmark (IFPI Danmark)	Platinum	50,000^{^}
France (SNEP)	Gold	100,000^{*}
Germany (BVMI)	Gold	150,000^{^}
Greece (IFPI Greece)	Platinum	30,000^{^}
Italy (FIMI)	Platinum	100,000^{*}
Japan (RIAJ)	Platinum	204,000
Netherlands (NVPI)	Gold	40,000^{^}
New Zealand (RMNZ)	Platinum	15,000^{^}
Spain (Promusicae)	Gold	50,000^{^}
Switzerland (IFPI Switzerland)	Gold	25,000^{^}
United Kingdom (BPI)	Gold	100,000^{^}
United States (RIAA)	2× Platinum	2,000,000^{^}
Summaries
Europe (IFPI)	2× Platinum	2,000,000^{*}
^{*} Sales figures based on certification alone.^{^} Shipments figures based on certification alone.
