= Lucille (album) =

Studio album by B. B. King
- Released: 1968
- Recorded: December 18 & 20, 1967
- Genre: Blues
- Length: 37:21
- Label: BluesWay, MCA
- Producer: Bob Thiele

B. B. King chronology
Blues on Top of Blues (1968)	Lucille (1968)	Live and Well (1969)

Lucille is the fifteenth album by blues artist B. B. King. It is named for his famous succession of Gibson guitars, currently the Signature ES-355.

Professional ratings
Review scores
Source	Rating
AllMusic	4/5 stars
The Penguin Guide to Blues Recordings	2.5/4 stars
Rolling Stone	(neutral)
The Rolling Stone Jazz Record Guide	4/5 stars

== Track listing ==
All tracks are written by B. B. King, except where indicated.

No.	Title	Writer(s)	Length
1.	"Lucille"		10:16
2.	"You Move Me So"		2:03
3.	"Country Girl"		4:25
4.	"No Money, No Luck Blues"	Ivory Joe Hunter	3:49
5.	"I Need Your Love"	Walter Spriggs	2:22
6.	"Rainin' All the Time"		2:56
7.	"I'm with You"		2:31
8.	"Stop Putting the Hurt on Me"		3:04
9.	"Watch Yourself"	Sidney Barnes; Luke Gross; George Kerr	5:47

== Personnel ==
- B.B. King - guitar, vocals
- Irving Ashby - guitar
- David "Leather Sax" Allen, Jr. - bass guitar
- Lloyd Glenn - piano
- Jessie Sailes - drums
- Maxwell Davis - leader, organ
- Bobby Forte, Bob McNeely, Cecil McNeely - saxophone
- Melvin Moore - trumpet
- John Ewing - trombone

Technical

- Jim Lockert - engineer
- Pauline Rivelli - cover photography
