= Live & Well (B. B. King album) =

Live album by B. B. King
- Released: 1969
- Genre: Blues
- Length: 48:05
- Label: BluesWay
- Producer: Bill Szymczyk

B. B. King chronology
Lucille (1968)	Live & Well (1969)	Completely Well (1969)

Live & Well is a live and studio album by B. B. King, released in 1969. The side A contains five tracks recorded "live" at the Village Gate, in New York City, and the side B five titles recorded in 'The Hit Factory' also in New York.

Professional ratings
Review scores
Source	Rating
AllMusic	3.5/5 stars
The Penguin Guide to Blues Recordings	3/4 stars
The Rolling Stone Jazz Record Guide	4/5 stars

== Recording ==
The album was produced by Bill Szymczyk. The 'live' side was recorded in early March, 1969, by engineer Phil Ramone. Szymczyck wrote in the liner notes: "Some of the songs you've heard before, but the performances of these songs you haven't heard until now".

The 'well' side was recorded in January, 1969, by engineer Joe Zagarino. It contains an instrumental, 'Friends'. Szymczyk wrote: "We got together, what I consider to be, some of the best young blues musicians in the country and locked ourselves in 'The Hit Factory' for two nights. The results of those two nights are the 'well' side of this album."

== Track listing ==
All tracks by B.B. King, except where noted.

Side A - "Live"

1. "Don't Answer the Door" (J. Johnson) - 6:14
2. "Just a Little Love" - 5:18
3. "My Mood" (B.B. King, V.S. Freeman) - 2:39
4. "Sweet Little Angel" (B.B. King, Jules Taub) - 5:03
5. "Please Accept My Love" (B.B. King, Sam Ling) - 3:14

Side B - "Well"

1. "I Want You So Bad" - 4:15
2. "Friends" (B.B. King, Bill Szymczyk) - 5:37
3. "Get Off My Back, Woman" (B.B. King, Ferdinand Washington) - 3:16
4. "Let's Get Down to Business" - 3:36
5. "Why I Sing the Blues" (B.B. King, Dave Clark) - 8:36

== Personnel ==
"Live" session

- B.B. King – guitar, vocals
- Sonny Freeman – drums
- Lee Gatling – saxophone
- Val Patillo – bass guitar
- Patrick Williams – trumpet
- Charlie Boles – organ

"Well" session

- B.B. King – guitar, vocals
- Paul "Harry" Harris – piano
- Hugh McCracken – guitar
- Gerald Jemmott – bass guitar
- Herb Lovelle – drums
- Al Kooper – piano [only on tracks 1 & 3]
