= 3 O'Clock Blues =

Blues song popularized by B.B. King

"Three O'Clock Blues"

Single by Lowell Fulson
- B-side: "I'm Wild About You, Baby"
- Released: 1948
- Recorded: Oakland, California, June 1946
- Genre: Blues
- Length: 3:05
- Label: Down Town; Down Beat
- Songwriter: Lowell Fulson

Lowell Fulson singles chronology
"Three O'Clock Blues" (1948)	"Come Back Baby" (1949)

"3 O'Clock Blues" or "Three O'Clock Blues" is a slow twelve-bar blues recorded by Lowell Fulson in 1946. When it was released in 1948, it became Fulson's first hit. When B.B. King recorded the song in 1951, it became his first hit as well as one of the best-selling R&B singles in 1952.

"3 O'Clock Blues" effectively launched King's career and remained a part of his concert repertoire throughout his life. The song was included on his first album, Singin' the Blues and since has appeared on several King albums, including a remake in 2000 with Eric Clapton for the Riding with the King album.

== Original song ==
Lowell Fulson recorded "Three O'Clock Blues" during his first recording session for Oakland, California-based record producer Bob Geddins in 1946. Fulson, who sang and played guitar, was accompanied by his brother Martin on second guitar. The duo produced several country blues-style songs after World War II.

According to music historian Ted Gioia, the song lyrics start out "as an insomniac's lament, but end up with a weepy farewell more suited to a suicide note":

Well now it's three o'clock in the morning, and I can't even close my eyes ...
Goodbye everybody, I believe this is the end

By the time of the record's release two years later in 1948, Fulson's style had already evolved into a West Coast blues style typified by his hit recordings for Downbeat and Swing Time Records, such as "Every Day I Have the Blues" and "Blue Shadows". Nonetheless, "Three O'Clock Blues", became a hit and reached number six in the R&B chart.

== B.B. King rendition ==
"Three O'Clock Blues"

Single by B.B. King

from the album Singin' the Blues
- B-side: "That Ain't the Way to Do It"
- Released: December 1951
- Recorded: c. September 1951
- Studio: YMCA, Memphis, Tennessee (makeshift)
- Genre: Blues
- Length: 3:01
- Label: RPM
- Songwriter: Lowell Fulson (credited to King)

B.B. King singles chronology
"She's a Mean Woman" (1951)	"Three O'Clock Blues" (1951)	"Fine Lookin' Woman" (1952)

=== Recording and composition ===
B.B. King recorded "3 O'Clock Blues" for RPM Records around September 1951. The recording took place at an improvised studio in a room at the Memphis YMCA and the resulting audio quality was lower than recordings by Sam Phillips, who had recorded King's previous singles. Nonetheless, writer Colin Escott notes that the song "clicked where the others hadn't [perhaps due to] the new found drama and urgency in B.B.'s singing [and] the interplay between his voice and guitar, heard for the first time on record". The mingling of these two elements was brought to the forefront by the distant, subdued sound of the accompanying musicians.

King's version is a slow (65 beats per minute) twelve-bar blues notated in 12/8 time in the key of C. Blues historian Robert Palmer sees King's guitar work on the song as showing his T-Bone Walker influences, "though his tone was bigger and rounder and his phrasing somewhat heavier". He borrowed Walker's technique of repeating a pitch on neighboring strings by sounding a note then sliding up to the same pitch on the successive lower string. This method allows the player to shift to higher position while creating a unique effect that emphasizes "tonal contrast". King also used melisma, a vocal technique found in gospel music, in which he bends and stretches a single syllable into a melodic phrase. Unlike Fulson, King used a full backing arrangement, including a horn section (including Evelyn Young on saxophone) and Ike Turner on piano.

=== Charts and recognition ===
"3 O'Clock Blues" was released by RPM Records in December 1951, and by December 29 it had entered Billboard magazine's Rhythm and Blues charts. The single spent a total of 17 weeks on the charts, including five weeks at number one.

"3 O'Clock Blues" launched B.B. King's career and gave him his first opportunity to perform in front of a national audience. Due to the song's success, he began performing in the big theaters, such as the Howard Theater in Washington and the Apollo in New York, with a significant increase in his weekly earnings, from about $85 to $2,500. It sparked a touring schedule that continued throughout King's career. In 1956, the song was included on King's first album, Singin' the Blues. It has remained in King's repertoire and he has recorded several versions of the song, including a 2000 release with Eric Clapton for their Riding with the King album.

In 2014, the 1951 recording was inducted into the Grammy Hall of Fame.

In 2020, the Blues Foundation inducted "3 O’Clock Blues" into the Blues Hall of Fame as a "Classic of Blues Recording". The induction statement described it as "the first record to amply capture the emerging brilliance of both his [King's] singing and guitar playing talents".
