= Blues on Top of Blues =

Studio album by B.B. King
- Released: 1968
- Genre: Blues
- Length: 31:49
- Label: ABC/BluesWay
- Producer: Johnny Pate

B.B. King chronology
Blues Is King (1967)	Blues on Top of Blues (1968)	Lucille (1968)

Professional ratings
Review scores
Source	Rating
AllMusic	4.5/5 stars
The Penguin Guide to Blues Recordings	2/4 stars
The Rolling Stone Jazz Record Guide	4/5 stars

Blues on Top of Blues is the fourteenth studio album by B.B. King, released in 1968 on BluesWay BLS-6011. The album peaked at number 46 on Billboard's R&B Albums chart.

== Track listing ==
All tracks are written by Riley King.

No.	Title	Length
1.	"Heartbreaker"	2:31
2.	"Losing Faith in You"	2:58
3.	"Dance with Me"	3:22
4.	"That's Wrong, Little Mama"	2:19
5.	"Having My Say"	2:39
6.	"I'm Not Wanted Anymore"	2:24
7.	"Worried Dream"	2:54
8.	"Paying the Cost to Be the Boss"	2:35
9.	"Until I Found You"	2:23
10.	"I'm Gonna Do What They Do to Me"	2:48
11.	"Raining in My Heart"	2:28
12.	"Now That You've Lost Me"	2:28
Total length:		31:49

== Personnel ==
B.B. King - Lead vocals, guitar and piano

Johnny Pate Big Band:

- Johnny Pate - Conductor
- Hobart Dotson, John Browning and Henry Boozier - Trumpet
- Pluma Davis - Trombone
- Lawrence Burdine - Alto sax
- Johnny Board - Tenor sax
- Barney Hubert - Baritone sax
- Duke Jethro - Organ
- Leo Lauchie - Bass
- Billy Butler - Guitar
- Sonny Freeman - Drums
