= Reflections (B. B. King album) =

Studio album by B.B. King
- Released: June 10, 2003
- Studios: Record One, Los Angeles, Sherman Oaks, Ca
- Genre: Blues
- Length: 46:27
- Label: MCA
- Producer: Simon Climie

B.B. King chronology
Makin' Love Is Good for You (2000)	Reflections (2003)	The Ultimate Collection (2005)

Reflections is an album by B.B. King, released in 2003. It pays tribute to the big band sound of King's youth.

== Critical reception ==
Professional ratings
Review scores
Source	Rating
AllMusic	4/5 stars
The Encyclopedia of Popular Music	2/5 stars
Rolling Stone	3/5 stars

PopMatters wrote that "among all the honorable, likable, vaguely disappointing numbers, there is one song, King's own 'Neighborhood Affair,' that provides a startling reminder that B.B. King is not simply a blues icon, not simply the affable symbol of a music that even non-fans can identify." The Washington Post called the album "safe and predictable" and "a minor footnote" in King's career.

== Track listing ==
1. "Exactly Like You" (Jimmy McHugh & Dorothy Fields) - 3:21
2. "On My Word of Honor" (Jean Miles, Katherine Harrison) - 3:22
3. "I Want a Little Girl" (Murray Mencher, Billy Moll) - 2:48
4. "I'll String Along with You" (Al Dubin, Harry Warren) - 3:31
5. "I Need You" (Ronald Irwin Satterfield, Laury Steve Bruce) - 3:03
6. "A Mother's Love" (Clyde Otis) - 2:59
7. "(I Love You) for Sentimental Reasons" (Deek Watson, William Best) - 3:31
8. "Neighbourhood Affair" (B.B. King, Jules Bihari) - 4:27
9. "Tomorrow Night" (Lonnie Johnson) - 3:38
10. "There I've Said it Again" (Redd Evans) - 3:30
11. "Always on My Mind" (Johnny Christopher, Mark James, Wayne Carson) - 3:57
12. "Cross My Heart" (Don Robey) - 4:29
13. "What a Wonderful World" (Bob Thiele, George David Weiss) - 3:57

== Personnel ==
- B.B. King – vocals, guitar
- Doyle Bramhall II – guitar
- Nathan East – bass guitar
- Joe Sample – piano, electric piano (Fender Rhodes: tracks 1, 3, 7, 10), (Wurlitzer: 5, 13)
- Toby Baker – piano, programming, electric piano (Fender Rhodes: 11, 12), (Wurlitzer: 6)
- Tim Carmon – piano (7), Hammond B3 organ
- Nicky Shaw – programming
- Abraham Laboriel Jr. – drums
