= There Must Be a Better World Somewhere =

Studio album by B. B. King
- Released: January 1981
- Studios: The Hit Factory, New York City
- Genre: Blues
- Length: 35:52
- Label: MCA
- Producer: Stewart Levine

B. B. King chronology
Now Appearing at Ole Miss (1980)	There Must Be a Better World Somewhere (1981)	Love Me Tender (1982)

There Must Be a Better World Somewhere is a studio album by B. B. King, released in 1981. It was awarded the Grammy Award for Best Ethnic or Traditional Recording the following year.

== Critical reception ==
Professional ratings
Review scores
Source	Rating
AllMusic	2.5/5 stars
The Penguin Guide to Blues Recordings	1.5/4 stars
The Rolling Stone Jazz Record Guide	4/5 stars

The New York Times wrote that "while the songs tend to be lackluster, the presence of some particularly fine musicians and a few old friends brings out above-average performances."

== Track listing ==
All tracks composed by Doc Pomus and Dr. John; except where indicated

1. "Life Ain't Nothing but a Party " – 6:13
2. "Born Again Human" – 8:32
3. "There Must Be a Better World Somewhere " – 5:30
4. "The Victim" – 6:15
5. "More, More, More" – 4:33 (Hugh McCraken and Jay Hirsh)
6. "You're Going with Me " – 4:32

== Personnel ==
- B.B. King – vocals, guitar
- Hugh McCracken – guitar
- David "Fathead" Newman – tenor saxophone
- Ronald E. Cuber – baritone saxophone
- Hank Crawford – alto saxophone
- Waymon Reed, Charlie Miller – trumpet
- Tom Malone – trombone
- Bernard Purdie – drums
- Dr. John – keyboards
- Wilbur Bascomb – bass guitar
- Donny Gerrard, Vennette Gloud, Carmen Twillie – backing vocals on "More, More, More"
- Stewart Levine – production
