= Every Day I Have the Blues =

Blues standard

Single by Pine Top a.k.a. Pinetop Sparks
- Released: 1935
- Recorded: July 28, 1935, Chicago, Illinois
- Genre: Blues
- Length: 3:03
- Label: Bluebird
- Songwriters: Aaron "Pinetop" Sparks; Milton Sparks (Note: Milton Sparks is also known as Marion Sparks.)

"Every Day I Have the Blues" is a blues song that has been performed in a variety of styles. An early version of the song is attributed to Pinetop Sparks and his brother Milton. It was first performed in the taverns of St. Louis by the Sparks brothers and was recorded July 28, 1935, by Pinetop with Henry Townsend on guitar. The song is a twelve-bar blues that features Pinetop's piano and falsetto vocal.

After a reworking of the song by Memphis Slim in 1949, it became a blues standard with renditions recorded by numerous artists. Four different versions of "Every Day I Have the Blues" have reached the Top Ten of the Billboard R&B chart and two—one by the Count Basie Orchestra with Joe Williams and one by B. B. King—have received Grammy Hall of Fame Awards. In 2019, the latter version was inducted into the Blues Foundation Hall of Fame as a "Classic of Blues Recording".

== Post-war versions ==
In 1949, Memphis Slim recorded the reworked song as "Nobody Loves Me". Although he used the Sparks brothers' opening verse, he rewrote the remainder of the lyrics, and sang the melody in a normal vocal range:

Nobody loves me, nobody seems to care (2×)
Speaking of bad luck people, you know I've had my share

"Nobody Love Me" was released as the B-side to Memphis Slim's "Angel Child" single. Although "Angel Child" became a hit (number six Billboard R&B chart), "Nobody Loves Me" did not enter the charts. However, when Lowell Fulson with Lloyd Glenn adapted Memphis Slim's arrangement, but used Sparks' earlier title, it became a hit and spent twenty-three weeks in the R&B chart, reaching number three in 1950. Fulson's "slow grooving" version, with sax and guitar solos, influenced B. B. King's later rendition of the song.

Jazz singer Joe Williams had hits with two different recordings of the song. The first version, recorded with the King Kolax Orchestra in 1952, reached number eight in the R&B chart (Checker 762). In 1955 in New York, he recorded a second and perhaps the most famous version of the song with the Count Basie Orchestra, titled "Every Day". It featured a big-band arrangement and spent twenty weeks in the R&B chart, reaching number two. Despite Sparks' earlier song, most versions of "Every Day I Have the Blues" are credited to Memphis Slim (to his real name, John Chatman, or to his pseudonym, Peter Chatman). Because of their success, Memphis Slim's composer royalties from the later hits by other artists "were sufficient to buy a Rolls Royce with which to squire himself around Paris," according to writer Colin Escott.

== B. B. King versions ==
Also in 1955, B. B. King recorded "Every Day I Have the Blues". King attributed the song's appeal to arranger Maxwell Davis: "He [Davis] wrote a chart of 'Every Day I Have the Blues' with a crisp and relaxed sound I'd never heard before. I liked it so well, I made it my theme ... Maxwell Davis didn't write majestically he wrote naturally, which was my bag. He created an atmosphere that let me relax." The song was recorded at Capitol Records' old studio on Melrose Avenue in Hollywood which, according to RPM Records part-owner Joe Bihari, had "a better sound" than the new studio in the company's new tower. Bihari commented on a technique which bypassed the then normal method of using a microphone on an instrumentalist's amplifier: "We jacked B.B.'s guitar straight into the board, so it sounded a little different."

RPM issued the song as a single, backed with "Sneakin' Around", which reached number eight on the R&B chart. It appears on several King albums, including his first, Singin' the Blues (1957). In 1959, King re-recorded the song as a guest vocalist with members of Basie's orchestra with Davis conducting. Kent Records released it as a single, backed with "Time to Say Goodbye". The remake is included on the 1959 album Compositions of Count Basie and Others and as a bonus track on a 2003 Ace Records reissue of King's 1959 album B. B. King Wails. The song became an important piece in King's repertoire and live recordings are included on Live at the Regal (1965) and Live in Cook County Jail (1971).

== Recognition and influence ==
"Every Day I Have the Blues" received two Grammy Hall of Fame Awards: Count Basie with Joe Williams' 1955 version "Every Day (I Have the Blues)" in 1992; and B. B. King's 1955 version "Every Day I Have the Blues" in 2004. Subsequently, a variety of artists have recorded the song. In 1967, Billy Stewart recorded a version that reached number 74 on the US Billboard Hot 100 and number 41 on its R&B chart.

In 2019, the Blues Foundation inducted "Every Day I Have the Blues" into the Blues Hall of Fame as a "Classic of Blues Recording". The induction statement includes:

"Everyday I Have the Blues" is one of the most ubiquitous of all blues songs, a required number in the repertoires of the countless bar and lounge bands of many genres. Its late entry into the Blues Hall of Fame reflects the fact that no strong consensus emerged as to which of the hundreds of recorded versions was most deserving. But it often is associated with B. B. King, and so the first of his own many versions gets the honors.

== Notes ==
Footnotes

Citations

References

- Escott, Colin (2002). B. B. King: The Vintage Years (Box set booklet). B. B. King. Ace Records. Ace ABOXCD 8.
- Danchin, Sebastian (1998). Blues Boy: The Life and Music of B. B. King. Jackson, Mississippi: University Press of Mississippi. ISBN 978-1578060177.
- Hall, Bob (2006). "Sparks Brothers". In Komara, Edward (ed.). Encyclopedia of the Blues. New York City: Routledge. ISBN 978-0-415-92699-7.
- Herzhaft, Gerard (1992). "Every Day I Have the Blues". Encyclopedia of the Blues. Fayetteville, Arkansas: University of Arkansas Press. ISBN 1-55728-252-8.
- Sullivan, Steve (2013). "Every Day I Have the Blues". Encyclopedia of Great Popular Song Recordings, Volume 2. Scarecrow Press. ISBN 978-0810882959.
- McGee, David (2005). B. B. King: There Is Always One More Time. Backbeat Books. ISBN 978-0-87930-843-8.
- Rothwell, Fred (2001). Long Distance Information: Chuck Berry's Recorded Legacy. Music Mentor. ISBN 978-0951988824.
- Whitburn, Joel (1988). Top R&B Singles 1942–1988. Menomonee Falls, Wisconsin: Record Research. ISBN 0-89820-068-7.
