= Take It Home (B. B. King album) =

Studio album by B. B. King
- Released: 1979
- Recorded: December 1978–January 1979
- Genre: Blues
- Length: 34:46
- Label: MCA
- Producer: Stix Hooper, Joe Sample, Stewart Levine, Wilton Felder

B. B. King chronology
Midnight Believer (1978)	Take It Home (1979)	Now Appearing at Ole Miss (1980)

Take It Home is a studio album by the American musician B.B. King, released in 1979. As with his previous album, Midnight Believer, members of the fusion band the Crusaders participated in the recording sessions.

== Critical reception ==
Professional ratings
Review scores
Source	Rating
AllMusic	2/5 stars
Christgau's Record Guide	B+
MusicHound Blues: The Essential Album Guide	2/5 stars
The Penguin Guide to Blues Recordings	2/4 stars
The Rolling Stone Album Guide	3/5 stars

In the United States, the album reached number 112 on the Billboard 200 and peaked at number 22 on Billboard's R&B Albums chart. The track "Better Not Look Down" reached number 30 on Billboard's R&B Singles chart.

The Bay State Banner noted that "the voice remains striking and the stinging fills when they come are impressive, but they cannot make routine arrangements and lyrics memorable."

Cub Koda of AllMusic commented that "the backing is grandiose and in line with contemporary trends, including a seven-piece horn section and a female chorus, but at the same time, B.B.'s piercing guitar and deep, rough vocals can still be fully appreciated" and described it as "one of B.B.'s more pop-oriented works." Robert Christgau noted that "while the songwriting by members of the Crusaders does not reach the heights of their 1978 collaboration, it yields a positive result in that it does not encroach upon each other's musical identity."

== Track listing ==
1. "Better Not Look Down" (Will Jennings, Joe Sample) – 3:22
2. "Same Old Story (Same Old Song)" (Jennings, Sample) – 4:32
3. "Happy Birthday Blues" (Jennings, Sample) – 3:15
4. "I've Always Been Lonely" (Jennings, Sample) – 5:28
5. "Second Hand Woman" (Jennings, Sample) – 3:20
6. "Tonight I'm Gonna Make You a Star" (Jennings, King) – 3:26
7. "The Beginning of the End" (Jennings, King) – 2:21
8. "A Story Everybody Knows" (Stix Hooper, Jennings) – 2:47
9. "Take It Home" (Wilton Felder, Jennings) – 3:07

== Personnel ==
- B.B. King – guitar, vocals
- Dean Parks, Paul Jackson Jr. – guitar
- Wilton Felder – double bass, saxophone on "Take It Home"
- Joe Sample – keyboards
- Stix Hooper, James Gadson – drums, percussion
- Paulinho da Costa – percussion
- Larry Williams, Quitman Dennis – saxophone
- Chuck Findley, Jack Richmond – trombone
- Gary Grant, Steve Madaio – trumpet
- Julia Tillman, Luther Waters, Maxine Williard, Oren Waters – background vocals
