= Roy Hawkins =

American singer-songwriter

Background information
- Born: Roy Theodore Hawkins; February 7, 1903; Jefferson, Texas, United States
- Origin: Oakland, California, U.S.
- Died: March 19, 1974 (aged 71) Compton, California, U.S.
- Genres: Rhythm and blues
- Occupations: Singer, songwriter
- Instrument: Piano
- Years active: c.1945–1960s
- Labels: Cava-Tone, Down Town, Modern, RPM, Rhythm, Music City, Kent

Roy Theodore Hawkins (February 7, 1903 – March 19, 1974) was an American blues singer, pianist, and songwriter. After working in clubs, he broke through with his 1950 song "Why Do Things Happen to Me" inspired by an auto accident which paralyzed his right arm. Several of his songs, most notably "The Thrill Is Gone", were covered by later artists, including Ray Charles, B.B. King, and James Brown.

== Biography ==
Hawkins was born in Jefferson, Texas. Little is known of the early part of his life. By the mid-1940s he was performing as a singer and pianist in the Oakland, California area, where he was discovered by musician and record producer Bob Geddins, who was impressed by Hawkins' "soulful, doom-laden style". Hawkins seems to have made his first recordings when about 45 years old, for the Cava-Tone and Down Town record labels in 1948. His band, the Four Jacks, included saxophonist William Staples, guitarist Ulysses James, bassist Floyd Montgomery, and drummer Madison Little.

He signed with Modern Records in Los Angeles the following year, and stayed with that label until 1954. He had his first chart hit with "Why Do Things Happen To Me" (also known as "Why Do Everything Happen To Me"). Though the song had been written by Geddins while Hawkins was hospitalized after his auto accident, he sold it to Jules Bihari at Modern, and the record was released with the songwriting credit given jointly to Bihari (as "Jules Taub") and Hawkins. "Why Do Things Happen To Me" reached number 2 on the Billboard R&B chart in early 1950, and was later recorded by both B. B. King and James Brown (as "Strange Things Happen").

Hawkins continued to release singles on Modern and had his second hit in 1951 with "The Thrill Is Gone", again co-credited to Bihari but in fact co-written with Rick Darnell. The record featured Maxwell Davis (saxophone), Willard McDaniel (piano) and Johnny Moore (guitar), and reached number 6 on the R&B chart. The song was later recorded by many other artists, including B. B. King – whose signature song it became – Aretha Franklin, and Willie Nelson.

After several less successful singles, including "Gloom and Misery All Around", an early song by Jerry Leiber and Mike Stoller, Hawkins left Modern in 1954. He recorded for a series of labels over the next few years including Flair, RPM, Rhythm, and Music City, for whom he recorded as Mr. Undertaker. His last recordings were made for Kent Records in 1961.

His later years were spent working in a furniture store. Hawkins died in Compton, California in 1974.

== Discography ==
=== Singles ===
- "They Raided The Joint" (1948)
- "Christmas Blues" (1948)
- "It's Too Late To Change" (1949)
- "Forty Jive" (1949)
- "Quarter To One" (1949)
- "Easy Going Magic" (1949)
- "West Express" (1949)
- "Sleepless Nights" (1949)
- "Why Do Things Happen To Me" (1950, R&B: number 2)
- "On My Way" (1950)
- "My Temper Is Rising" (1950)
- "Just A Poor Boy" (1950)
- "Blues All Around Me" (1951)
- "You're The Sweetest Thing" (1951)
- "The Thrill Is Gone" (1951, R&B: number 6)
- "Gloom And Misery All Around" (1951)
- "You're A Free Little Girl" (1952)
- "Highway 59" (1952)
- "The Thrill Hunt" (1952)
- "Bad Luck Is Falling" (1953)
- "I Wonder Why" [reissue of "Why Do Everything Happen To Me"] (1953)
- "If I Had Listened" (1955)
- "Trouble In Mind" (1962)

=== LP/CD releases ===
- Why Do Everything Happen To Me (Route 66 #KIX-9 [LP], 1979)
- Highway 59 (Ace #CHD 103 [LP], 1984)
- The Thrill Is Gone: The Legendary Modern Recordings (Ace #CDCHD-754, 2000)
- Bad Luck Is Falling: The Modern, RPM and Kent Recordings, Vol. 2 (Ace #CDCHD-1096, 2006)

== See also ==
- List of West Coast blues musicians
- West Coast blues
