= Black Angel Blues =

Blues standard first recorded by Lucille Bogan

Single by Lucille Bogan
- B-side: "Tricks Ain't Walking No More"
- Released: December 1930–1931
- Recorded: December 17, 1930
- Genre: Blues
- Length: 3:11
- Label: Brunswick (no. 7186)
- Songwriter(s): Unknown

"Black Angel Blues", also known as "Sweet Black Angel" or "Sweet Little Angel", is a blues standard that has been recorded by numerous blues and other artists. The song was first recorded in 1930 by Lucille Bogan, one of the classic female blues singers. Bogan recorded it as a mid-tempo, twelve-bar blues, featuring her vocal with piano accompaniment.

In 1934, Tampa Red recorded "Black Angel Blues" for Vocalion Records. The song was performed at a slower tempo and featured prominent slide-guitar lines by Tampa Red. These early songs were released before Billboard or a similar reliable service began tracking such releases, so it is difficult to gauge which version was more popular, although subsequent versions showed Tampa Red's influence. Robert Nighthawk recorded "Black Angel Blues" in 1949. Accompanying Nighthawk on vocal and electric slide guitar were bassist Willie Dixon, and pianist Ernest Lane (the single, with its flip side "Annie Lee Blues", listed the performers as "The Nighthawks"). The following year Tampa Red recorded an updated version of the song, substituting a lyric and calling it "Sweet Little Angel"; in 1953, Earl Hooker recorded it as "Sweet Angel".

In 1956, B.B. King recorded "Sweet Little Angel" (RPM Records 468). According to King, "I got the idea for 'Sweet Little Angel' from Robert Nighthawk's 'Sweet Black Angel', though I later discovered that the song had been recorded by someone before Nighthawk. At the time 'black' was not a popular word, as it is now. Instead of using the old title, I changed it to 'Sweet Little Angel'—and that was a pretty big record for me". King's version, which included a horn section, was a stylistic shift for the song and it became a hit, reaching number eight on the Billboard R&B chart. In 1957, he re-recorded "Sweet Little Angel" for his first album Singin' the Blues. Both versions prominently feature B.B. King's guitar work, with his note-bends "sounding almost like a lap steel in places."

After B.B. King's success, many blues and other artists recorded their versions of "Sweet Little Angel". Robert Nighthawk's "Black Angel Blues" was inducted in 2007 into the Blues Foundation Hall of Fame "Classics of Blues Recordings" category and B.B. King's "Sweet Little Angel" is included in the Rock and Roll Hall of Fame's list of "500 Songs that Shaped Rock and Roll".
