= Rock Me Baby (song) =

Blues standard popularized by B.B. King and Muddy Waters

Single by B.B. King

from the album Rock Me Baby
- B-side: "I Can't Lose"
- Released: May 1964
- Recorded: Los Angeles, prior to January 14, 1962
- Genre: Blues
- Length: 2:56
- Label: Kent
- Songwriter(s): Joe Josea, B.B. King

B.B. King singles chronology
"How Blue Can You Get" (1964)	"Rock Me Baby" (1964)	"Help The Poor" (1964)

"Rock Me Baby" is a blues standard that has become one of the most recorded blues songs of all time. It originated as "Rockin' and Rollin'", a 1951 song by Lil' Son Jackson, itself inspired by earlier blues. Renditions by Muddy Waters and B.B. King made the song well-known. When B.B. King's recording of "Rock Me Baby" was released in 1964, it became his first single to reach the Top 40 in Billboard magazine's Hot 100 chart.

In 2022, King's recording was inducted into the Blues Hall of Fame in the 'Classics of Blues Recording – Singles' category.

== Earlier songs ==
B.B. King's "Rock Me Baby" is based on the 1951 song "Rockin' and Rollin'" by Lil' Son Jackson. King's lyrics are nearly identical to Jackson's, although instrumentally the songs are different: "Rockin' and Rollin'" is a solo piece, with Jackson's vocal and guitar accompaniment, whereas "Rock Me Baby" is an ensemble piece.

Muddy Waters' song "Rock Me", recorded in 1956, is also based on Jackson's song. Some of Jackson's lyrics were used, but Waters incorporated a couple of verses from his 1951 song "All Night Long" (that is also based on "Rockin' and Rollin'"). Muddy Waters' version also uses Jackson's guitar figure and the starting of the vocal on the IV chord and he interpreted it as an unusual fifteen-bar blues (an uneven number of measures, rather than the traditional twelve bars or somewhat less common eight or sixteen bars). Muddy Waters recorded a second version of "Rock Me" for his 1978 album I'm Ready.

Lil' Son Jackson's "Rockin' and Rollin'" was inspired by earlier blues songs. Many songs from the 1920s through the 1940s have some combination of rock, roll, baby, and mama in the title or lyrics, although instrumentally they are different than "Rock Me Baby", "Rock Me", or "Rockin' and Rollin'". Big Bill Broonzy's 1940 song "Rockin' Chair Blues" serves as the basis for several renditions and makes frequent use of the phrase "rock me baby" as in "Rock me baby now, rock me slow ... now rock me baby, one time before you go". Arthur Crudup's 1944 song, "Rock Me Mama", is also based on Broonzy's song and repeats the same refrain, but uses "mama" in place of "baby". "Roll Me Mama", a 1939 song by Curtis Jones shares a couple of phrases ("like a wagon wheel", "ain't got no bone") with "Rockin' and Rollin'".

== B.B. King song ==
"Rock Me Baby" is a medium-tempo twelve-bar blues notated in the key of C in common or 4/4 time. King's guitar fills are a key feature of the song, leading to its appeal to guitarists. The piano part is also prominent. Kent part-owner Joe Bihari recalled the pianist as King's frequent collaborator Maxwell Davis, although others have been suggested, such as Lloyd Glenn and Jimmy McCracklin.

There is some confusion as to when B.B. King recorded "Rock Me Baby". Although King had signed to ABC-Paramount Records on January 14, 1962, his former label, Kent Records, continued to release singles (and albums) well into the 1970s. Recording dates have been estimated as "about 1958" to before 1962. The song was released shortly after King's Paramount release "How Blue Can You Get" in 1964 and reached number 34 in the Billboard Hot 100. (Note: Billboard's R&B chart was suspended from November 1963 to January 1965, so there is no corresponding R&B chart position for "Rock Me Baby" or other songs released during this period.) "Rock Me Baby" was the first of six B.B. King records to reach the Top 40. In 1997, King re-recorded the song with Eric Clapton for the album Deuces Wild.

== Influence ==
Over the years, many blues and other artists have interpreted and recorded "Rock Me Baby" and it has become a blues standard. Although Lil' Son Jackson's 1951 "Rockin' and Rollin'" serves as the basis for many versions, B.B. King's and Muddy Waters' renditions are credited for making it well-known.

== Notes ==
Footnotes

Citations

References

- Birnbaum, Larry (2012). Before Elvis: The Prehistory of Rock 'n' Roll. Lanham, Maryland: Scarecrow Press. ISBN 978-0-8108-8629-2.
- Escott, Colin (2002). B.B. King: The Vintage Years (Box set booklet). B.B. King. Ace Records. Ace ABOXCD 8.
- Hal Leonard (1995). "Rock Me Baby". The Blues. Milwaukee, Wisconsin: Hal Leonard. ISBN 0-79355-259-1.
- Herzhaft, Gerard (1992). "Rock Me, Baby". Encyclopedia of the Blues. Fayetteville, Arkansas: University of Arkansas Press. ISBN 1-55728-252-8.
- Whitburn, Joel (1988). Top R&B Singles 1942–1988. Menomonee Falls, Wisconsin: Record Research. ISBN 0-89820-068-7.
