= Midnight Believer =

Studio album by B. B. King
- Released: 1978
- Genre: Blues
- Length: 33:19
- Label: ABC
- Producer: Stewart Levine

B. B. King chronology
| King Size (1977) | Midnight Believer (1978) | Take It Home (1979) |

Midnight Believer is an album by the American musician B.B. King, released in 1978 on ABC Records. The album reached No. 27 on the Billboard Top Soul Albums chart.

== Overview ==
Midnight Believer was produced by Stewart Levine. Artists including Roland Bautista and the Crusaders appeared on the album.

== Singles ==
A song from the album called "Never Make a Move Too Soon" reached No. 19 on the Billboard Hot Soul Songs chart.

== Critical reception ==
Professional ratings
Review scores
| Source | Rating |
|---|---|
| AllMusic | 3/5 stars |
| Christgau's Record Guide | B |
| The Penguin Guide to Blues Recordings | 2/4 stars |
| The Rolling Stone Album Guide | 3/5 stars |

Mike Freedberg of the Bay State Banner wrote that "the music he relies on is updated, synthesized, stringed mood ring music that's so today it stings; but King finds a way to act cool, undoing thirty years of gospel blues." Raphael Callaghan of the Liverpool Echo found that, "backed by the jazz-funk of the Crusaders, [King] became an alchemist and turned the beautifully-crafted songs of Will Jennings into blues nuggets with the most heartfelt singing."

Bill Dahl of AllMusic noted, "Another collaboration that worked a lot better than one might have expected. King and the Crusaders blended in a marginally funky, contemporary style for the buoyant 'Never Make Your Move Too Soon' and an uplifting 'When It All Comes Down'."

== Track listing ==
All tracks by Will Jennings and Joe Sample, except where noted.

1. "When It All Comes Down (I'll Still Be Around)" - 4:11
2. "Midnight Believer" - 4:59
3. "I Just Can't Leave Your Love Alone" - 4:18
4. "Hold On (I Feel Our Love Is Changing)" - 4:10
5. "Never Make a Move Too Soon" (Stix Hooper, Jennings) - 5:29
6. "A World Full of Strangers" - 4:23
7. "Let Me Make You Cry a Little Longer" - 5:49

== Personnel ==
- B.B. King – guitar, vocals
- Robert Popwell – bass guitar
- Joe Sample – keyboards
- Stix Hooper – drums, percussion
- Roland Bautista – rhythm guitar
- James Gadson – drums
- Wilton Felder – bass guitar, tenor saxophone
- Rik Pekkonen – recording and mixing engineer
- Bernie Grundman – mastering engineer
