= Singin' the Blues =

Compilation album by B.B. King
- Released: June 1957
- Recorded: 1951–1956
- Genre: Blues
- Label: Crown

B.B. King chronology
Singin' the Blues (1957)	The Blues (1958)

Singin' the Blues is the first LP album by American blues musician B.B. King, released in 1957 by the Bihari brothers on their Crown budget label. It is a compilation album whose songs were issued between 1951 and 1956 on singles by RPM Records and most had reached the Top 10 on Billboard's Race/R&B singles charts. King continued to perform and record several of the songs throughout his career, such as "Every Day I Have the Blues", "Woke Up This Morning", and "Sweet Little Angel".

== Critical reception ==
Professional ratings
Review scores
Source	Rating
AllMusic	4.5/5 stars
The Penguin Guide to Blues Recordings	4/4 stars

Billboard (June 10, 1957): "One of the better r.&b. artists, a goodly portion of B.B. King's hits have been put together in this set. B.B.'s country blues vocal style, together with his frenetic guitar method, is enough to sell the r.&b. market. Price here is the attraction, too."

In an overview for AllMusic, critic Bill Dahl called it "absolutely seminal material; his classic hits." The Penguin Guide to Blues Recordings says that it is “self-evidently a near-faultless album.”

== Reissues ==
Singin' the Blues has been reissued and repackaged several times, including by P-Vine Records (Japan), Ace Records (UK), and Flair Records/Virgin Records (US).

== Track listing ==
Details are taken from the 1991 Flair Records/Virgin Records CD reissue (the original Crown LP does not list running times) and may differ from other sources.

All tracks are written by B.B. King and Jules Taub (a pseudonym of label co-owner Jules Bihari), although several are derived from earlier recordings by other blues artists as noted.

Side one
No.	Title	Notes	Length
1.	"Please Love Me"		2:47
2.	"You Upset Me Baby"		3:00
3.	"Every Day I Have the Blues"	Recorded by Memphis Slim a.k.a. Peter Chatman in 1949	2:46
4.	"Bad Luck"	Derived from "Bad Luck Blues" by Ivory Joe Hunter in 1946	2:51
5.	"3 O'Clock Blues"	Recorded by Lowell Fulson in 1948	2:59
6.	"Blind Love"	Derived from "Standing at My Window" by Arthur Crudup (1942)	2:54

Side two
No.	Title	Notes	Length
1.	"Woke Up This Morning"		2:55
2.	"You Know I Love You"		3:03
3.	"Sweet Little Angel"	Recorded by Lucille Bogan in 1930 and Tampa Red in 1934 as "Black Angel Blues"	2:58
4.	"Ten Long Years"		2:46
5.	"Did You Ever Love a Woman"	Recorded by Gatemouth Moore in 1945	2:31
6.	"Crying Won't Help You"	Recorded by Tampa Red in 1946	2:56

== Sources ==
- Escott, Colin (2002). B.B. King: The Vintage Years (Box set booklet). B.B. King. Ace Records. Ace ABOXCD 8.
- Schneider, Cy (1991). Singin' the Blues/The Blues (Reissue album notes). B.B. King. Beverly Hills, California: Virgin Records. V2-86296.
- Whitburn, Joel (1988). "B.B. King". Top R&B Singles 1942–1988. Menomonee Falls, Wisconsin: Record Research. ISBN 0-89820-068-7.
