= Maxwell Davis =

American R&B saxophonist, bandleader, and record producer (1916–1970)

Background information
- Born: Thomas Maxwell Davis Jr. January 14, 1916; Independence, Kansas, U.S.
- Died: September 18, 1970 (aged 54) Los Angeles, California, U.S.
- Genres: Swing; jazz; R&B; urban blues
- Occupations: Musician; arranger; record producer
- Instrument: Saxophone
- Years active: 1937–1970
- Labels: Aladdin; Federal; Modern; RPM; Crown; Kent

Thomas Maxwell Davis Jr. (January 14, 1916 – September 18, 1970), was an American rhythm and blues saxophonist, arranger, bandleader and record producer.

== Biography ==
Davis was born in Independence, Kansas, in 1916. In 1937, he moved to Los Angeles, California, playing saxophone in the Fletcher Henderson orchestra. After some years playing swing and jazz, he became more involved in the West Coast R&B scene in the mid-1940s, becoming a regular session musician and arranger for the fast-growing independent record labels such as Aladdin. He also recorded with the Jay McShann band, featuring Jimmy Witherspoon, a blues shouter. He was hired to play the soundtrack for the saxophonist part acted by Big Jay McNeely in the 1950 noir film D.O.A. By 1952, Davis had played on numerous R&B hits by Percy Mayfield, Peppermint Harris, Clarence "Gatemouth" Brown, T-Bone Walker, Amos Milburn, and others. He also arranged and played on Little Willie Littlefield's 1952 "K. C. Lovin'" for Federal Records.

In 1955, he left Aladdin and joined the Bihari brothers at Modern Records (and its subsidiaries RPM, Crown, and Kent) as musical director and a producer. As the Biharis' main bandleader, Davis arranged the music and found the musicians. Although his success rate started to diminish thereafter, he became regarded as an elder statesman and as "the father of West Coast R&B".

"Maxwell Davis is an unsung hero of early rhythm and blues", noted the songwriter and producer Mike Stoller. "He produced, in effect, all of the record sessions for Aladdin records, Modern records, all the local independent rhythm and blues companies in the early 1950s, late 1940s in Los Angeles."

His final recording activity was in 1969, as the producer of the soul singer Z. Z. Hill.

Davis died from a heart attack, in Los Angeles, California, in September 1970.

== Discography ==
=== As sideman ===
With B. B. King

- 1956: Singin' the Blues (Crown)
