= The Thrill Is Gone =

Blues standard popularized by B.B.King

- One of side-A labels of the US single

Single by B.B. King

from the album Completely Well
- B-side: "You're Mean"
- Released: December 1969
- Recorded: June 1969
- Genre: R&B, soul blues
- Length: 3:55 (single version); 5:30 (album version)
- Label: Bluesway/ABC
- Songwriters: Rick Darnell, Roy Hawkins
- Producer: Bill Szymczyk

B.B. King singles chronology
"Just a Little Love" (1969)	"The Thrill Is Gone" (1969)	"So Excited" (1970)

Official audio
- "The Thrill Is Gone" (album version) on YouTube

"The Thrill Is Gone" is a slow minor-key blues song written by West Coast blues musician Roy Hawkins and Rick Darnell in 1951. Hawkins's recording of the song reached number six in the Billboard R&B chart in 1951. In 1970, "The Thrill Is Gone" became a major hit for B.B. King. His rendition helped make the song a blues standard. In June 2026, CBS News included the song in its list of the 250 essential American songs of the past 250 years.

== B.B. King rendition ==
B.B. King recorded his version of "The Thrill Is Gone" in June 1969 for his album Completely Well, released the same year. King's version is a slow 12-bar blues notated in the key of B minor in 4/4 time. The song's polished production and use of strings marked a departure from both the original song and King's previous material.

When BluesWay Records released "The Thrill Is Gone" as a single in December 1969, it became one of the most successful of King's career and one of his signature songs. It reached number three in the Billboard Best Selling Soul Singles chart and number 15 in the broader Billboard Hot 100 chart.

The song also helped launch the career of producer Bill Szymczyk, as it was his first hit record success as a producer.

B.B. King's recording earned him a Grammy Award for Best Male R&B Vocal Performance in 1970 and a Grammy Hall of Fame award in 1998. King's version of the song was also placed at number 183 on Rolling Stone magazine's list of the 500 greatest songs of all time. Live versions of the song were included on King's albums Live in Cook County Jail (1971), Bobby Bland and B.B. King Together Again...Live (1976), and Live at San Quentin (1991).

== Aretha Franklin version ==
Aretha Franklin covered the song on her 1970 album, Spirit in the Dark.
