= Lucille & Friends =

Compilation album by B.B. King
- Released: 1995
- Genre: Blues, jazz, rock
- Label: MCA

B.B. King chronology
Blues Summit (1993)	Lucille & Friends (1995)	Deuces Wild (1997)

Lucille & Friends is the thirty-fourth album by B.B. King released in 1995. On it, he is accompanied by major jazz, rock, and blues artists who collaborated on these songs over the past 25 years.

Professional ratings
Review scores
Source	Rating
AllMusic	3/5 stars
The Penguin Guide to Blues Recordings	2.5/4 stars

== Track listing ==
1. "When Love Comes to Town" (With U2) - 4:16
2. "Playin' with My Friends" (With Robert Cray) - 5:17
3. "To Know You Is to Love You" (With Stevie Wonder) - 8:29
4. "Caught a Touch of Your Love" (With Grover Washington Jr.) - 5:07
5. "All You Ever Give Me Is the Blues" (With Vernon Reid) - 4:27
6. "You Shook Me" (With John Lee Hooker) - 4:58
7. "Spirit in the Dark" (With Diane Schuur) - 5:01
8. "Can't Get Enough" (With Mick Fleetwood and Stevie Nicks) - 4:52
9. "Since I Met You Baby" (With Gary Moore) - 2:51
10. "B.B.'s Blues" (With Branford Marsalis) - 10:02
11. "Better Not Look Down" (With The Crusaders) 3:20
12. "Frosty" (With Albert Collins) - 3:23
13. "Hummingbird" (With Leon Russell and Joe Walsh) - 4:33
14. "Ghetto Woman" (With Gary Wright and Ringo Starr) - 5:11
15. "Let the Good Times Roll" (With Bobby Bland) - 5:31

=== Track origins ===
- Track 1 from the U2 album Rattle and Hum (1988)
- Tracks 2 & 6 from Blues Summit (1993)
- Track 3 from To Know You Is To Love You (1973)
- Track 4 from the Grover Washington Jr. album Strawberry Moon (1987)
- Track 5 previously unreleased (from the same January 1991 sessions as "Many Miles Traveled" on King of the Blues)
- Track 7 from Heart To Heart
- Track 8 from King of the Blues: 1989
- Track 9 from the Gary Moore album After Hours (1992)
- Track 10 from the Branford Marsalis album I Heard You Twice The First Time (1992)
- Track 11 from Take It Home (1979)
- Track 12 from the Albert Collins album Collins Mix (1993)
- Track 13 from Indianola Mississippi Seeds (1970)
- Track 14 from B.B. King In London (1971)
- Track 15 from Together Again...Live (1976)

== Charts ==
Chart performance for Lucille & Friends
Chart (1995–1997)	Peak position
Australian Albums (ARIA)	95
Austrian Albums (Ö3 Austria)	43
New Zealand Albums (RMNZ)	29
