= James Bolden =

James Bolden may refer to:

- James Bolden (basketball) (born 1996), American basketball player
- James "Boogaloo" Bolden (born 1950), American musician and band leader
- James Bolden, pseudonym used by French singer David Christie (1948–1997)
