= Blues Summit =

Studio album by B.B. King
- Released: June 22, 1993
- Recorded: February 15–19, 1993 at Ardent Studios, Memphis, Tennessee; except tracks 1, 4 and 12, March 8–12, 1993 at Fantasy Studios, Berkeley, California
- Genre: Blues
- Length: 62:37
- Label: MCA
- Producer: Dennis Walker (tracks: A1, B1, B2), Denny Diante (tracks: A2 to A6, B3 to B6)

B.B. King chronology
There is Always One More Time (1991)	Blues Summit (1993)	Lucille & Friends (1995)

Professional ratings
Review scores
Source	Rating
AllMusic	3/5 stars
The Penguin Guide to Blues Recordings	3/4 stars

Blues Summit is the thirty-third studio album by B.B. King released in 1993 through the MCA label. The album reached peak positions of number 182 on the Billboard 200, and number 64 on Billboard's R&B Albums chart. The album won a Grammy Award in 1994 for Best Traditional Blues Album.

It is the first of three duet albums in King's studio album discography. Unlike Deuces Wild and 80, all the guests come from the blues and R&B scene. The only song which is not a duet is the original "I Gotta Move Out Of This Neighborhood", which segues into "Nobody Loves Me But My Mother" (originally from Indianola Mississippi Seeds). All songs feature the B.B. King band of the era except for "Playin' With My Friends" (the only other new song on the album) and "You Shook Me", where the accompaniment comes from the Robert Cray Band, plus "Everybody's Had the Blues" featuring Joe Louis Walker's band.

A longer version of "Call It Stormy Monday" with the full ending and lacking the horn overdubs of the album version later appeared on the compilation album B.B. King: Anthology.

== Credits and personnel ==
=== A1 - Playin' With My Friends - 5:17 ===
- Bass – Richard Cousins
- Drums – Kevin Hayes
- Guitar, Vocals – Robert Cray
- Horns – The Memphis Horns
- Keyboards – Jim Pugh
- Rhythm Guitar – Robert Murray
- Written-By – Dennis Walker, Robert Cray

=== A2 - Since I Met You Baby - 4:44 ===
- Piano, Vocals – Katie Webster
- Rhythm Guitar – Vasti Jackson
- Saxophone – Nancy Wright
- Written-By – Ivory Joe Hunter

=== A3 - I Pity The Fool - 4:36 ===
- Guitar, Vocals – Buddy Guy
- Harmonica – Kim Wilson
- Rhythm Guitar – Mabon "Teenie" Hodges
- Trumpet – Ben Cauley
- Written-By – Deadric Malone

=== A4 - You Shook Me - 4:58 ===
- Bass – Richard Cousins
- Drums – Kevin Hayes
- Guitar – Robert Cray
- Guitar, Vocals – John Lee Hooker
- Harmonica – Kim Wilson
- Keyboards – Jim Pugh
- Percussion – Tony Coleman
- Slide Guitar – Roy Rogers
- Trumpet – Ben Cauley
- Written-By – J. B. Lenoir, Willie Dixon

=== A5 - Something You Got - 4:02 ===
- Backing Vocals – Julia Tillman Waters, Maxayne Lewis, Maxine Waters
- Baritone Saxophone – Walter King
- Percussion – Antoine Salley
- Rhythm Guitar – Robert Cray
- Saxophone Solo – Lee Allen
- Vocals – Koko Taylor
- Written-By – Chris Kenner

=== A6 - There's Something On Your Mind - 5:59 ===
- Strings [Synthesizer] – Randy Waldman
- Vocals – Etta James
- Written-By – Cecil James McNeely

=== B1 - Little by Little - 4:07 ===
- Backing Vocals – Joe Louis Walker
- Guitar, Vocals – Lowell Fulson
- Written-By – Amos Blakemore

=== B2 - Call It Stormy Monday - 7:17 ===
- Guitar, Vocals – Albert Collins
- Horns – The Memphis Horns
- Written-By – Aaron T. Walker

=== B3 - You're The Boss - 4:05 ===
- Vocals – Ruth Brown
- Written-By – Leiber & Stoller

=== B4 - We're Gonna Make It - 3:51 ===
- Backing Vocals – Julia Tillman Waters, Maxayne Lewis, Maxine Waters
- Horns – The Memphis Horns
- Rhythm Guitar – Mabon "Teenie" Hodges
- Saxophone Solo – Lee Allen (musician)
- Vocals – Irma Thomas
- Written-By – Billy Davis, Carl Smith, Gene Barge, Raynard Miner

=== B5 - I Gotta Move Out Of This Neighborhood / Nobody Loves Me But My Mother - 8:57 ===
- Trumpet – Ben Cauley
- Written-By – B.B. King

=== B6 - Everybody's Had The Blues - 4:35 ===
- Bass – Henry Oden
- Drums – Paul Revelle
- Guitar, Vocals – Joe Louis Walker
- Horns – Jeff Lewis, Tim Devine
- Keyboards – Mike Eppley
- Percussion – Tony Coleman
- Written-By – Joe Louis Walker

== Personnel ==
- Vocals, Guitar – B.B. King (all tracks)
- Bass – Michael Doster (except tracks 1, 4 and 12)
- Drums – Calep Emphrey, Jr. (except tracks 1, 4 and 12)
- Keyboards – James Toney (except tracks 1, 4 and 12)
- Percussion – Tony Coleman (except track 1)
- Rhythm Guitar – Leon Warren (except tracks 1, 4 and 12)
- Saxophone – Melvin Jackson, Walter King (except tracks 1 and 12)
- Trumpet – James Bolden (except tracks 1 and 12)

== Other credits ==
- Musical Director & Horn arrangements – Walter King (except tracks 1 and 12)
- Album Concept, Co-Producer & Liner Notes – Andy McKaie
- Executive Producer – Sidney A. Seidenberg
- Mixed by John Hampton at Ardent Studios, assisted by Skidd Mills
- Mastered by Bernie Grundman at Bernie Grundman Mastering
