= Twist, Arkansas =

Coordinates: 35°22′34″N 90°30′26″W

- Unincorporated community
- Interactive map of Twist, Arkansas
- Country: United States
- State: Arkansas

Twist is an unincorporated community in Cross County, Arkansas, United States. Twist was named after a nearby plantation of the same name.

Twist was mentioned in the B.B. King song "Lucille" as the location of a club where he once played. It was at this club in Twist where two men started a fight over a woman named Lucille which set the place on fire. Because of this incident, King named his guitar Lucille.

The blues musician Little Mack Simmons (1933–2000) was born in Twist.

== Gallery ==
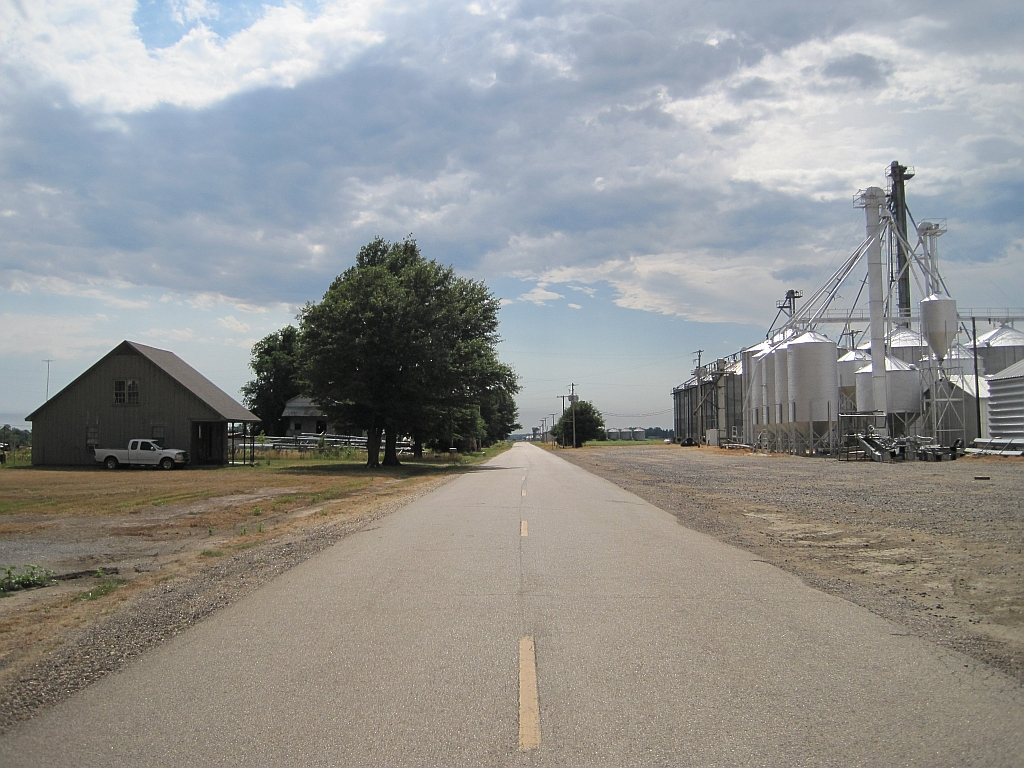

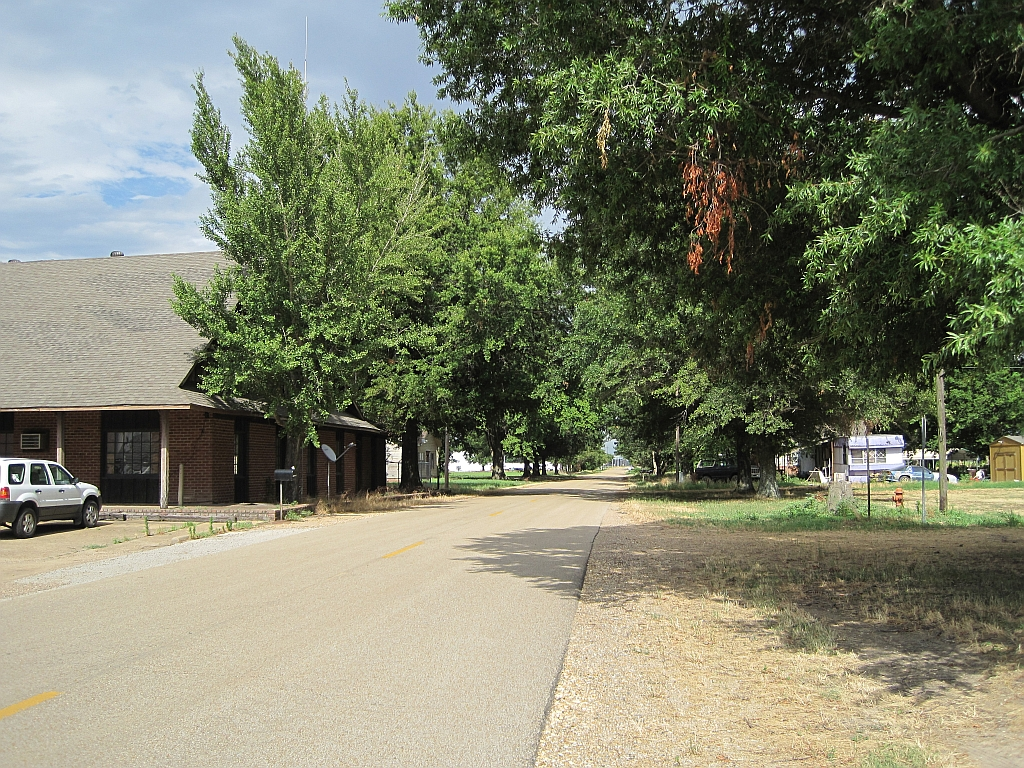

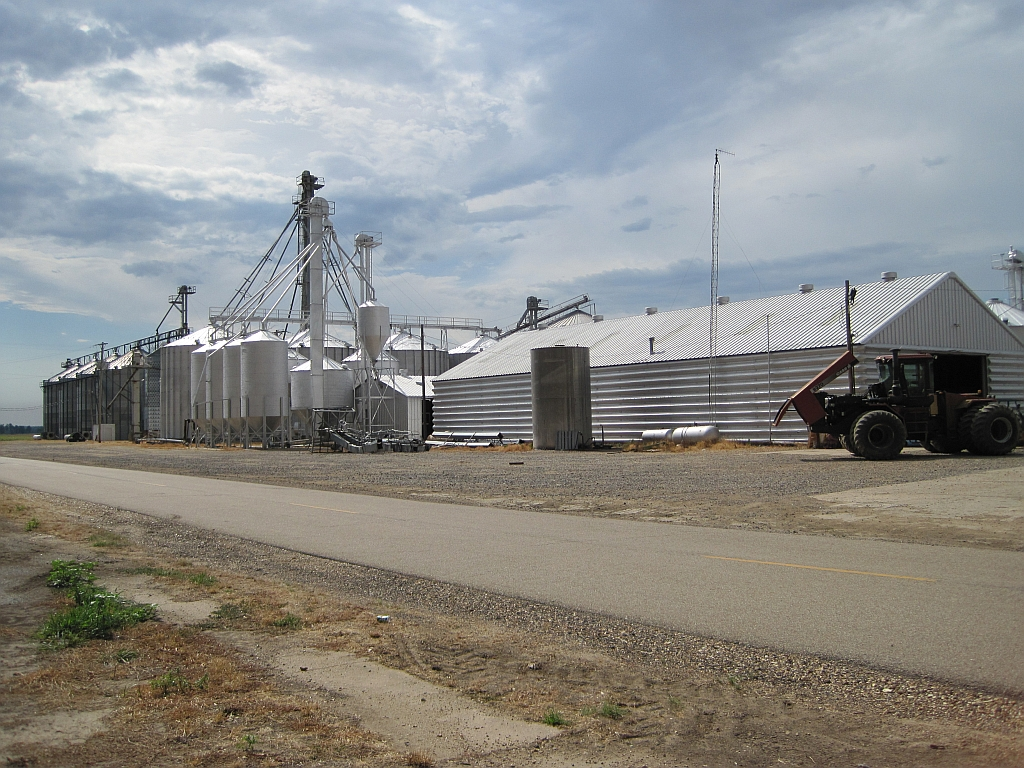
