= Live at the Apollo (B. B. King album) =

Live album by B.B. King
- Released: April 16, 1991
- Recorded: November 10, 1990
- Venue: Apollo Theater, New York City
- Genre: Blues
- Length: 43:34
- Label: GRP
- Producer: Carl Griffin, Josiah Gluck, Sidney A. Seidenberg

B.B. King chronology
B.B. King and Sons Live (1990)	Live at the Apollo (1991)	There Is Always One More Time (1991)

Professional ratings
Review scores
Source	Rating
AllMusic	3/5 stars
The Penguin Guide to Blues Recordings	3/4 stars

Live at the Apollo is a blues album by B.B. King and the Phillip Morris "Super Band" recorded at the famous Apollo Theater in Harlem, New York. It was awarded the 1992 Grammy Award for Best Traditional Blues Album.

== Track listing ==
Side one

1. "When Love Comes to Town" (Paul David Hewson/ U2) - 4:40
2. "Sweet Sixteen" (B. B. King, Joe Josea) - 7:25
3. "The Thrill Is Gone" (Ravon Darnell, Roy Hawkins) - 3:33
4. "Ain't Nobody's Bizness" (Everett Robbins, Porter Grainger) - 2:43
5. "Paying the Cost to Be the Boss" (B. B. King) - 2:30

Side two

1. "All over Again" (Carl B. Adams, B. B. King) - 7:33
2. "Nightlife" (Willie Nelson) - 4:03
3. "Since I Met You Baby" (Ivory Joe Hunter) - 3:55
4. "Guess Who" (Jo Ann Belvin) - 5:03
5. "Peace to the World" (Trade Marvin) - 2:51

== Personnel ==
- B.B. King - lead guitar, vocals
- Jeff Clayton - alto saxophone
- Jerry Dodgion - alto saxophone
- Plas Johnson - tenor saxophone
- Gary Smulyan - tenor saxophone
- Ralph Moore - tenor saxophone
- Harry "Sweets" Edison - trumpet
- James Morrison - trumpet
- Joe Mosello - trumpet
- Robin Eubanks - trombone
- George Bohanon - trombone
- Paul Faulise - trombone
- Urbie Green - trombone
- Ray Brown - bass
- Kenny Burrell - guitar
- Harold Jones - drums
- Gene Harris - piano, conductor
