= Onzie Horne =

American musician (1923-1973)

Onzie O. Horne (5 September 1923 – 9 February 1973) was an American arranger, businessman, conductor, disc jockey, and musician. He worked with Count Basie, Duke Ellington, Lionel Hampton, Sammy Davis Jr, Rufus Thomas and BB King and was the first African American to conduct the Chicago Symphony Orchestra.

== Career ==
Horne was born in Memphis to father Eugene G. Horne. He received his education through the Memphis City School system and later at the Chicago Music Conservatory, University of Tennessee and LeMoyne College, where he received a bachelor's degree. During his musical education, he studied with Quincy Jones and Billy Strayhorn. In anticipation of working in business, he studied for qualifications from Charter Life Underwriters, Life Office Management Association and Life Underwriters Training.

Horne had a successful career at the Union Protective Life Insurance Company, holding senior positions in the company. An active civic and commercial leader, Horne held directorships on many boards and societies and was even named Man of the Year of the Memphis Junior Chamber of Commerce. He also owned and managed a nightclub, The Living Room, where he performed in the house jazz band, The Maestros. Alongside his business career, Horne was a music teacher and band director at several high schools where he trained musicians such as Hank Crawford, Phineas Newborn Jr and Charles Lloyd.

For radio station WDIA, Horne presented the talk show "Man On The Street" for which he would conduct live interviews. At iconic Beale Street venues such as the Palace Theatre, Old Daisy Theatre and New Daisy Theatre, Horne was the director of music.

A well-rounded musician, Horne could play many instruments although his favourite was vibraphone. He arranged music for a wide variety of artists including Glen Campbell, Carla Thomas, Willie Mitchell and Al Jackson. Horne did orchestration for Stax recordings including for Isaac Hayes with whom he assisted with "Theme from Shaft" and co-arranged the theme for The Men. Horne was hired to arrange for BB King and taught him the Schillinger system which has been credited with helping King's composition ability. Willie Mitchell, who lived with him in the 1940s, was also taught the Schillinger system by Horne and cited his influence in interviews throughout his life.

Horne died at age 49 on 9 February 1973.

== Personal life ==
Horne was married to Mildred Peace Horne with whom he had two sons, Onzie Jr and Merrick. Mildred died in 2013. Onzie Horne Jr was Isaac Hayes' manager and head of the Beale Street Merchants Association.
