= B.B. King Museum =

Museum celebrating the cultural heritage of the Mississippi Delta

Coordinates: 33.449582°N 90.645661°W

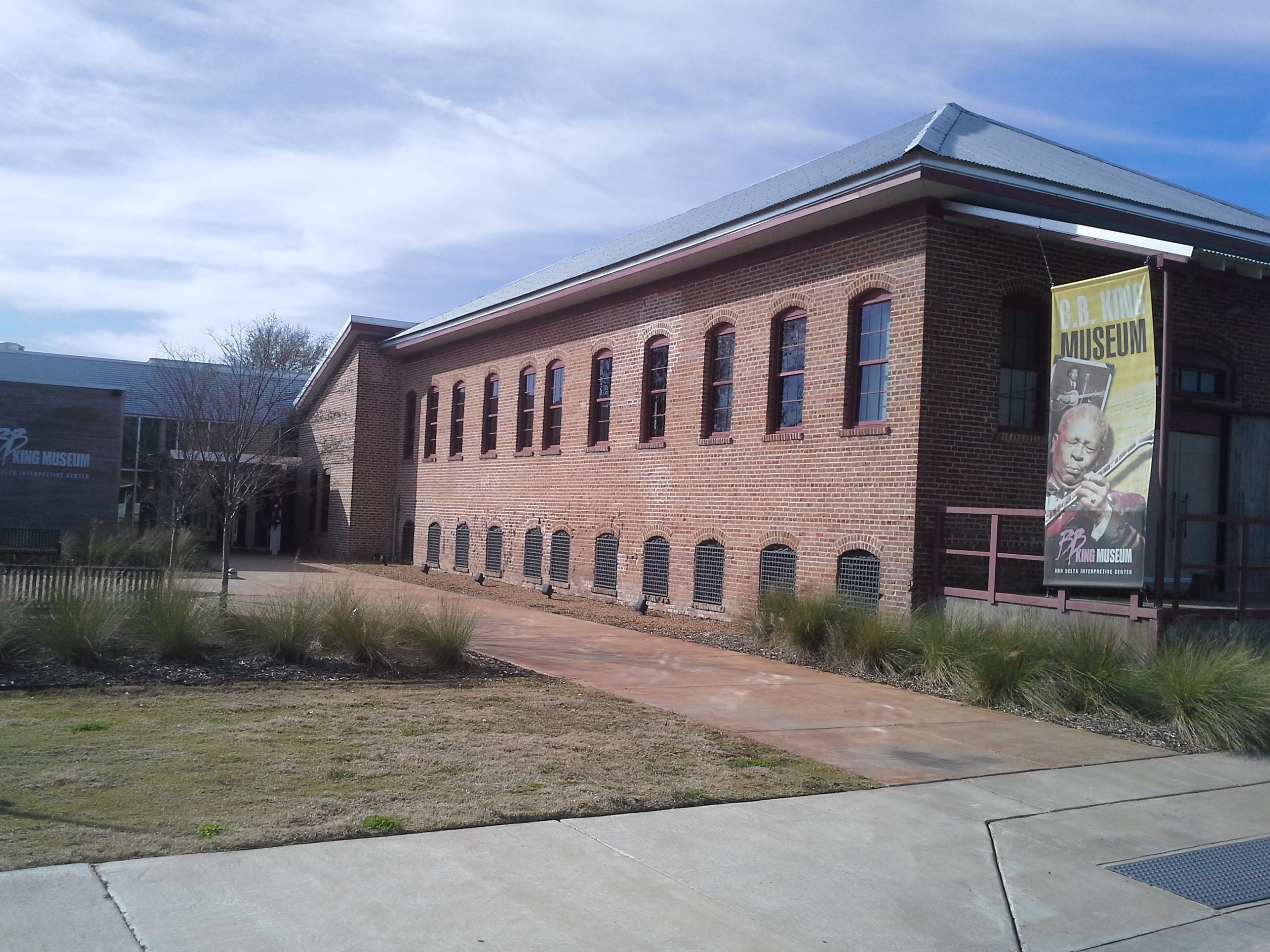
B.B. King Museum and Delta Interpretive Center in Indianola, Mississippi, showing the cotton gin at which B.B. King worked.

The B.B. King Museum and Delta Interpretive Center is a museum in Indianola, Mississippi dedicated to the Delta blues and music legend B.B. King.

== Museum history and purpose ==
The stated mission of the museum is to "empower, unite and heal through music, art and education and share with the world the rich cultural heritage of the Mississippi Delta."

The museum was first announced in January 2004 in B.B. King's home town of Indianola, Mississippi, with a planned groundbreaking in June 2005. The plan included a $10 million facility encompassing 15,000 square feet.

The B.B. King Museum and Delta Interpretive Center opened on September 13, 2008. The museum features a restored brick cotton gin building where B.B. King worked in the 1940s. The museum also contains an extensive collection of artifacts owned by King and displays exhibits about his life and the lives of other musicians of the delta region and the culture where the blues arose. The museum commemorates the famous blues artist B.B King, who was from the Mississippi Delta. The museum has multiple exhibits highlighting King's Delta Blue music using interactives, King memorabilia, and stories. Exhibits also explore the culture of the Delta birthplace of the Blues, including the troubled times of the Jim Crow era and the struggle of the Civil Rights Movement. The museum seeks to help preserve Delta Blues and its culture by promoting its importance.

In 2015, shortly after his death at age 89, King was buried at the museum and center in a planned memorial garden.

== See also ==
- Delta Blues Museum
- List of museums in Mississippi
- List of music museums
