= L.A. Midnight =

Studio album by B.B. King
- Released: 1972
- Genre: Blues
- Label: ABC
- Producer: Ed Michel

B.B. King chronology
B.B. King in London (1971)	L.A. Midnight (1972)	Guess Who (1972)

Professional ratings
Review scores
Source	Rating
AllMusic	3/5 stars
Christgau's Record Guide	B+
The Rolling Stone Jazz Record Guide	4/5 stars

L.A. Midnight is the twentieth studio electric blues album by B.B. King released in 1972. It features two extended guitar jams with fellow guitarists Jesse Ed Davis and Joe Walsh ("Midnight" and "Lucille's Granny"). It also features Taj Mahal on harmonica and guitar. ("Can't You Hear Me Talking to You" and "I've Been Blue Too Long" respectively). "Can't You Hear Me Talking to You" also features Davis on guitar.

== Track listing ==
Side A

1. "I Got Some Help I Don't Need" (Dave Clark, B.B. King) - 5:54
2. "Help the Poor" (Charles Singleton) - 3:33
3. "Can't You Hear Me Talking" (Dave Clark, B.B. King) - 3:57
4. "Midnight" (B.B. King) - 8:14

Side B

1. "Sweet Sixteen" (Joe Josea) - 7:01
2. "(I Believe) I've Been Blue Too Long" (Dave Clark, B.B. King) - 4:50
3. "Lucille's Granny" (B.B. King) - 7:53

== Personnel ==
- B.B. King – vocals, guitar
- Jesse Ed Davis – guitar, slide guitar (A1, A4, B2, B3)
- Joe Walsh – guitar (A1, A4, B3)
- Mel Brown – guitar (A2, B1)
- Randy Wolfe – guitar (A3, B2)
- Taj Mahal – guitar (B2), harmonica (A3)
- Paul Harris – piano (A1, B2)
- Victor Feldman – piano (A1, A4, B3), congas (A2, A3)
- Ron Levy – piano (A2, B1)
- Clifford Coulter – piano (A3), tambourine (A2)
- John Turk – Hammond organ (A3)
- Bryan Garofalo – bass guitar (A1, B2)
- Wilbert Freeman – bass guitar (A2, B1)
- Ron Brown – bass guitar (A3, A4, B3)
- Bob Morin – drums (A1, B2)
- Sonny Freeman – drums (A2, B1)
- Earl Palmer – drums (A3, A4, B3)
- Sandy Konikoff – tambourine (B3)
- Bobby Bryant – trumpet (A1, B3)
- John Browning – trumpet (A2, B1)
- Red Callender – tuba (A1, B2, B3)
- Joseph Burton – trombone (A2, B1)
- Red Holloway – tenor saxophone (A1, B3)
- Louis Hubert – tenor saxophone (A2, B1)
- Plas Johnson – baritone saxophone (A1, B3)
- Earl Turbinton – alto saxophone (A2, B1)
