= Makin' Love Is Good for You =

Studio album by B.B. King
- Released: April 25, 2000
- Recorded: Dockside Studio, Maurice, Louisiana, United States
- Genre: Blues
- Length: 59:02
- Label: MCA
- Producer: B. B. King, Floyd Lieberman, Sidney A. Seidenberg

B.B. King chronology
Riding with the King (2000)	Makin' Love Is Good for You (2000)	Reflections (2003)

Professional ratings
Review scores
Source	Rating
AllMusic	3/5 stars
The Penguin Guide to Blues Recordings	3/4 stars

Makin' Love Is Good for You is a 2000 album by American blues musician B. B. King, his thirty-eighth studio album.

== Track listing ==
1. "I Got to Leave This Woman" (Melvin Jackson)
2. "Since I Fell for You" (Buddy Johnson)
3. "I Know" (Barbara George)
4. "Peace of Mind" (Riley King, Joe Josea)
5. "Monday Woman" (Willie Mabon)
6. "Ain't Nobody Like My Baby" (Riley King)
7. "Makin' Love Is Good for You" (Tony Joe White)
8. "Don't Go No Farther" (Willie Dixon)
9. "Actions Speak Louder than Words" (Riley King)
10. "What You Bet" (Robert Taylor, George Williams)
11. "You're on Top" (Riley King, Sam Ling)
12. "Too Good to You Baby" (Riley King)
13. "I'm in the Wrong Business" (A.C. Reed)
14. "She's My Baby" (Riley King)
15. "It's Still Called the Blues" (Earl Forest, George Jackson, Robert Alton Miller)

== Personnel ==
- B.B. King – lead guitar
- James Bolden, Darrell Leonard, Stanley Abernathy – trumpet
- Walter R. King, Melvin Jackson – saxophone
- Calep Emphrey Jr. – drums
- Leon Warren, John Porter – guitar
- Michael Doster – bass guitar
- James Toney, Tommy Eyre – keyboards
- Joe Sublett – tenor saxophone
- Tony Braunagel – percussion
