= Calvin Owens =

American blues musician and bandleader

Calvin Owens (April 23, 1929 – February 21, 2008) was an American trumpeter, composer, bandleader, and record producer whose genre-crossing career spanned over six decades. A central figure in the Houston music scene, Owens collaborated with major blues and jazz artists, led his own orchestra, and founded the independent record label, Sawdust Alley Records. He is best remembered for two separate stints as B. B. King's bandleader, extensive recording work with Houston's Peacock Records, and his late-career founding of Sawdust Alley Records.

== Early life and education ==
Owens was born in Houston, Texas, and raised in the city's Fifth Ward neighborhood, an area nicknamed Sawdust Alley due to the presence of a nearby mill. Raised by his mother, a New Orleans native, and his adoptive father, Sam Owens, he developed an early interest in music, especially after hearing stories of Louis Armstrong. He began playing trumpet at age 13 and studied under the Houston music educator Samuel H. Harris. He graduated from Phillis Wheatley High School in 1949.

== 1950s: Early career and first tenure with B. B. King ==
After high school, Owens joined Leonard Duncan and His Harlem Revue and later toured with the Brown Skin Models Revue. He became a fixture at Houston venues such as Sid's Ranch, the Casino, and the Eldorado Ballroom, backing acts including Big Mama Thornton and Big Joe Turner.

In 1953, Owens joined the band of B. B. King, becoming King's first music director. He toured extensively with King until 1957 and arranged several tracks during this period. Owens also worked for Peacock Records as audio and recording director, contributing to the label's golden era.

== 1960s - 1970s: Session work and regional prominence ==
Following his departure from King's band, Owens remained active in Houston as a session musician and arranger. He played with Otis Turner's band and performed with numerous blues and jazz musicians including Junior Parker, Amos Milburn, Gloria Edwards, Arnett Cobb, and David "Fathead" Newman. He also worked at Peacock Records, helping to develop local talent.

During this period Owens also recorded under his own name. His instrumental recording "The Cat," released with The Fascinators on Houston's Ovide label, was later included on the compilation Texas Soul '69. In a later interview, Owens recalled that the piece began as a rhythmic groove before he added horn arrangements and eventually commissioned lyrics for a later version.

Outside of music, Owens briefly worked at a Maxwell House coffee factory. During this time, he honed his skills as an arranger and developed his own musical identity. He performed both in large ensembles and smaller groups, leading local combos at clubs and community events throughout the city. His playing was recognized for its power and range — "always first trumpet," in the words of guitarist Texas Johnny Brown.

== 1980s: Return to B.B. King and international recognition ==
In 1978, Owens rejoined B. B. King as bandleader and horn arranger. He assembled and led a new version of King's touring band, contributing to albums and television appearances. He arranged all the horn parts for King's 1983 album, Blues 'n' Jazz.

In 1984, Owens led King's band during a live outdoor concert for more than 3,000 inmates at Parchman Penitentiary. This concert, highlighting songs from King's Blues 'n' Jazz, was broadcast the same year by Mississippi Public Broadcasting on PBS under the title B.B. at Parchman Prison (1984).

Later that year, Owens left the band, citing artistic differences and burnout. He moved to Brussels, Belgium, where he married Sarah Send, adopted a sober and vegetarian lifestyle, and began developing his own compositions and big band projects.

== 1990s - 2000s: Sawdust Alley Records and independent work ==
While in Belgium, Owens formed an 18-piece band and began recording original music. By the mid-1990s, he had launched his own label, Sawdust Alley Records, named after his childhood neighborhood. His releases included True Blue (1993), That's Your Booty, Es Tu Booty (a Spanish-language adaptation), and Another Concept, a jazz-focused instrumental album.

Returning to Houston in the late 1990s, Owens continued to produce and record prolifically. His projects featured collaborations with artists such as Evelyn Rubio, Trudy Lynn, Norma Zenteno, and Andy Bradley. He also contributed to Johnny Bush's 2007 album, Kashmere Gardens Mud, which helped inspire Willie Nelson's subsequent jazz-blues-country crossover project, Young at Heart.

In interviews, Owens emphasized his view that jazz and blues were not separate genres but part of a shared African American musical tradition. He resisted classification and simply referred to his work as "our music."

== Death and legacy ==
Calvin Owens died on February 21, 2008, at age 78, from renal failure, following surgery for liver cancer.
