= Lucille (guitar) =

Name given to B.B. King's guitars

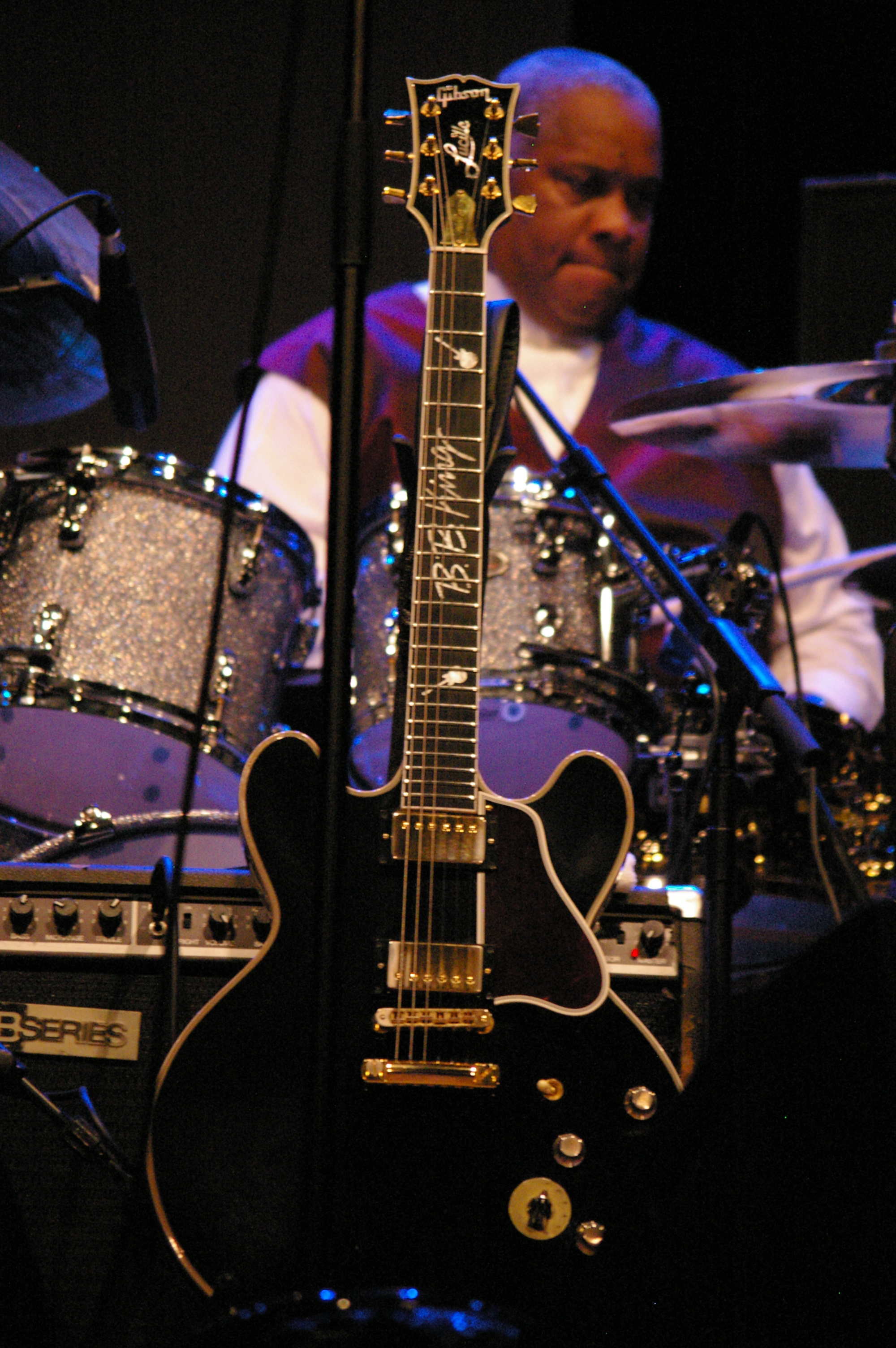
A Gibson Lucille model semi-acoustic guitar, unique for having no f-holes

Lucille is the name American blues musician B. B. King (1925–2015) gave to his guitars. They were usually black Gibson guitars similar to the ES-330 or ES-355, and Gibson introduced a B.B. King custom model in 1980, based upon the latter.

== The story of Lucille ==
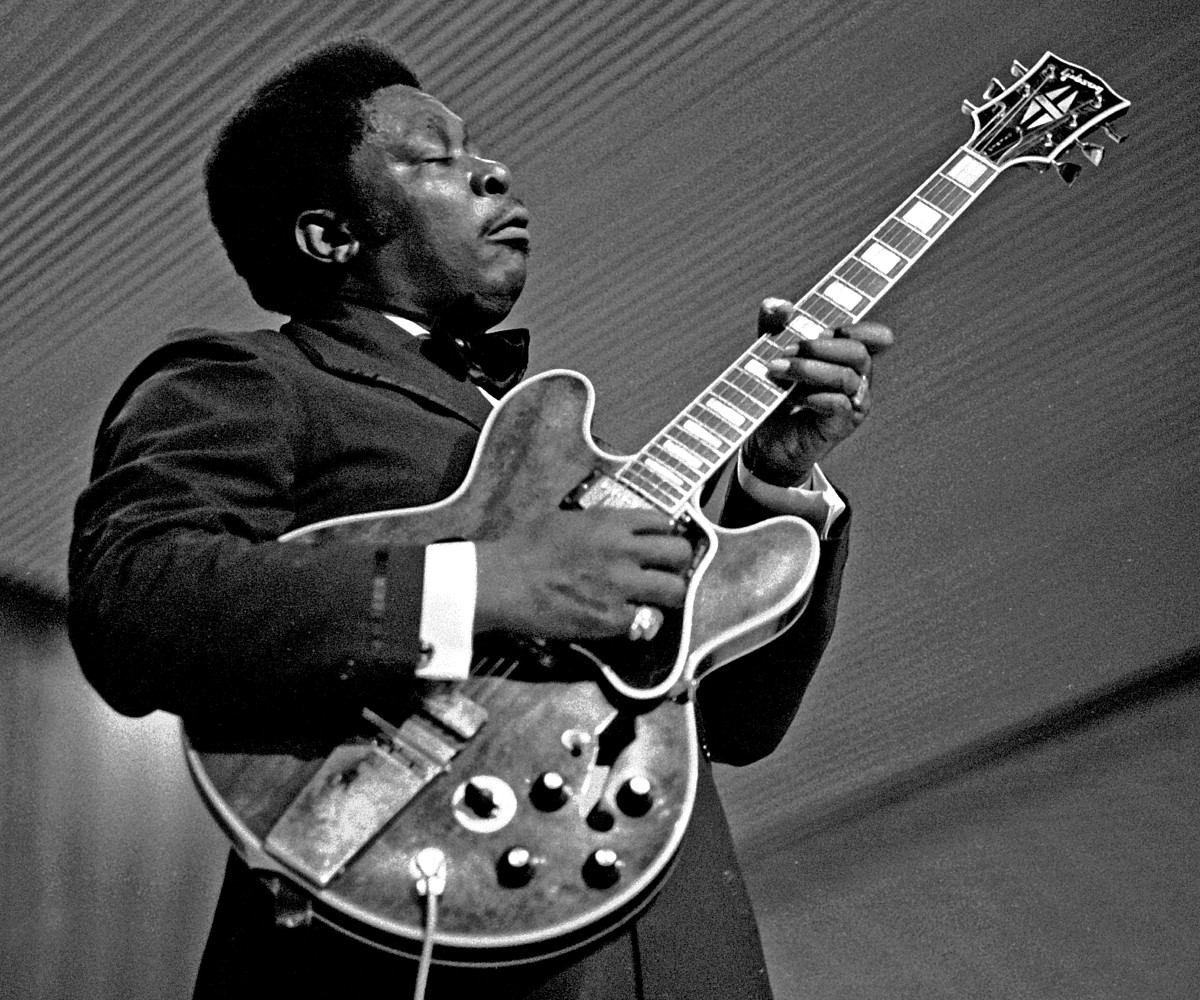
King in Hamburg 1971 with one of his Lucilles

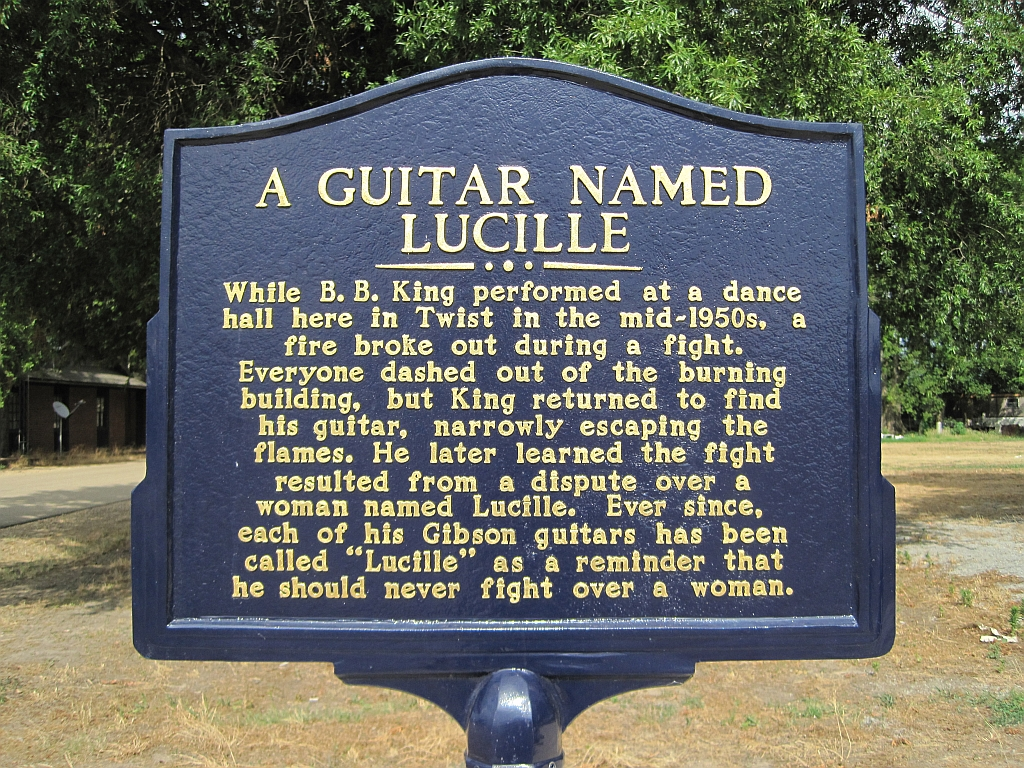
Sign commemorating the "Lucille" story, Twist, Arkansas

In the winter of 1949, King played at a dance hall in Twist, Arkansas. The hall was heated by a barrel half-filled with burning kerosene set in the middle of the dance floor, a fairly common practice at the time. During a performance, two men began to fight, knocking over the barrel and sending the burning fuel across the floor. The hall burst into flames and was evacuated.

Once outside however, King realized that he had left his guitar inside so he went back into the burning building to retrieve his beloved $30 Gibson guitar. King learned the next day that the two men who started the fire had been fighting over a woman who worked at the hall named Lucille. King did not know Lucille but named that guitar, and every guitar he subsequently owned, Lucille, as a reminder never again to do something as stupid as run into a burning building or fight over a woman.

King wrote a song called "Lucille" in which he talks about his guitar and how it got its name. The song was first released on the album Lucille and is included on the King Anthology 1962–1998 album. King also recorded a track called "My Lucille" (which also references his guitar). Written by Ira Newborn, it was released in 1985 and was part of the music for the film Into the Night.

== Lucilles through King's career ==
=== Early Lucilles ===
King played guitars made by different manufacturers early in his career. He played a Fender Telecaster on most of his recordings with RPM Records. However, he is best known for playing variants of the Gibson ES-335.

=== Gibson Lucille ===
Gibson Lucille
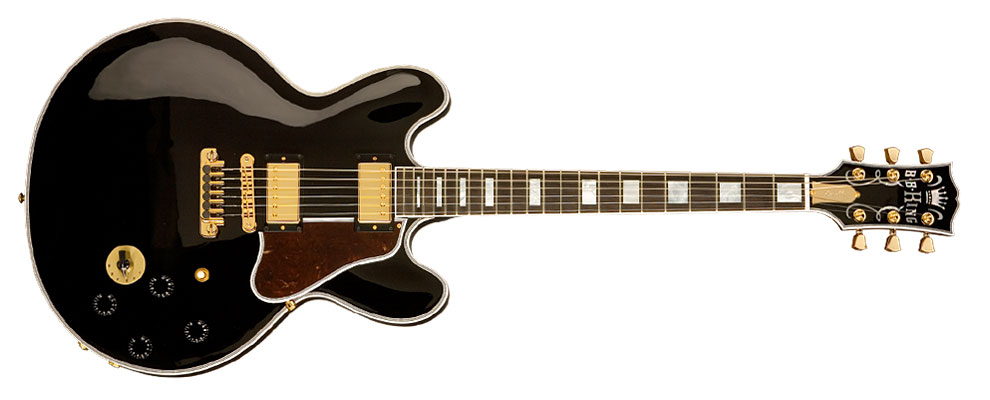
- Gibson Lucille
- Manufacturer: Gibson Guitar Corporation, Epiphone
- Period: 1980–2015

Construction
- Body type: Semi-hollow
- Scale: 24 3/4"/1 11/16"

Woods
- Body: Maple
- Neck: Maple
- Fretboard: Ebony

Hardware
- Bridge: Tune-o-matic/TP-6
- Pickup(s): 490R Alnico magnet humbucker/490T Alnico magnet humbucker

Colors available
- Black and also available in Emerald, Amethyst, Sapphire Blue, Ruby and Diamond

In 1980, Gibson Brands launched the B. B. King Lucille model. The most noticeable differences between the Lucille and the Gibson ES-355TD-SV on which it is based are the "Lucille" script on the headstock, the maple neck, and the lack of F-holes on the top. King requested that, to reduce feedback, there be no F-holes.

Gibson made the B.B. King Standard model from 1980 to 1985. This model had chrome hardware and dot inlays instead of block inlays.

The Gibson subsidiary Epiphone markets a low-cost, foreign-made Lucille model based on the Gibson Lucille. Differences include a variation on the headstock inlays, a gloss finish and different pickups.

=== Gibson Little Lucille ===
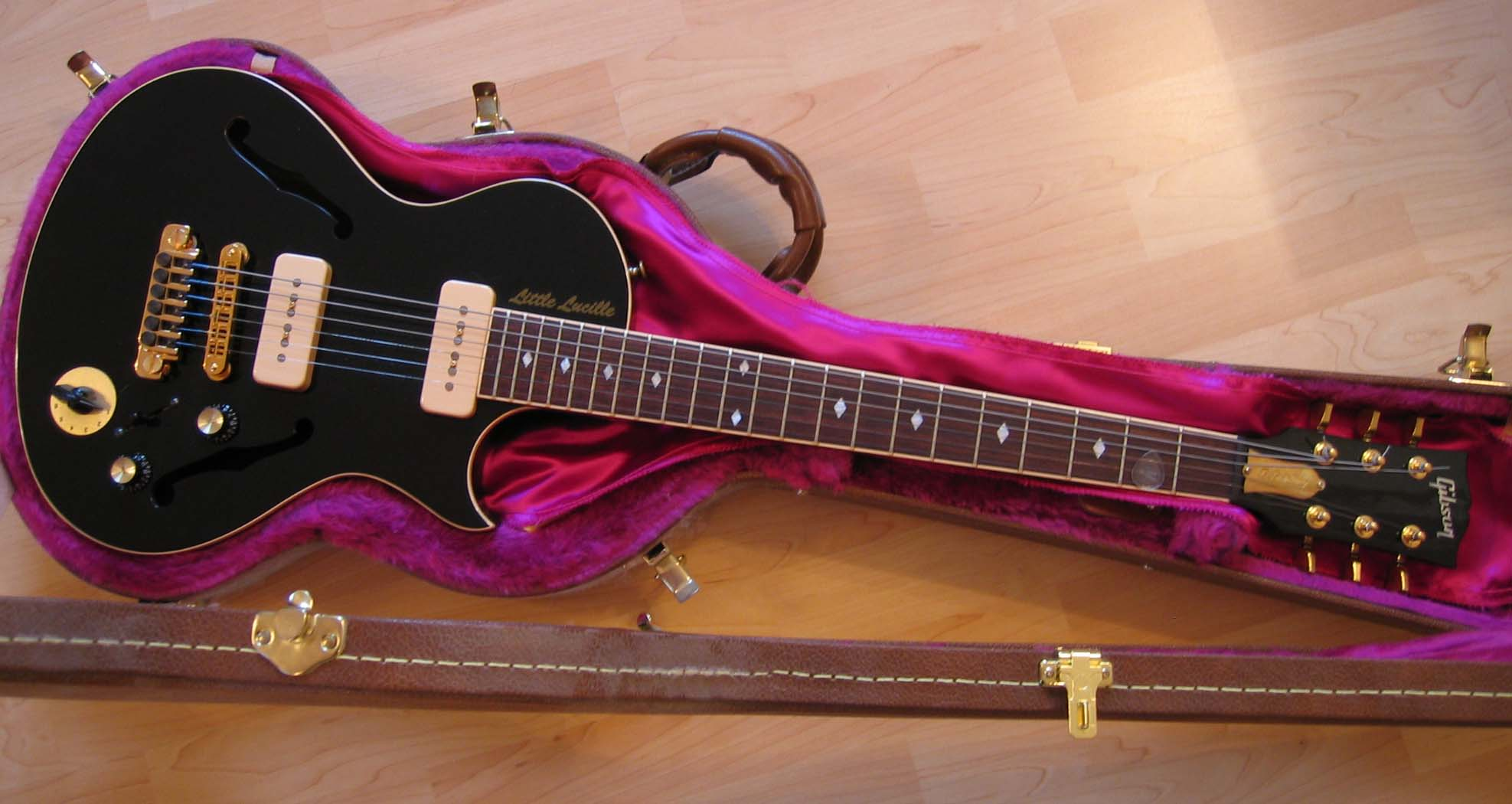
Gibson Little Lucille

In 1999, Gibson launched the Little Lucille, a version of its Blueshawk guitar. It differed from the Blueshawk in having a Tune-o-matic bridge and a TP-6 stop tailpiece. Gibson has since discontinued the Little Lucille and the Blueshawk on which it was based.

=== The 80th Birthday Lucille ===
In 2005, for King's 80th birthday, Gibson made a special run of 80 Gibson Lucilles, referred to as the 80th Birthday Lucille. The company presented the first prototype, which was engraved by Baron Technology Inc., with design work by Scott Jeffrey, to King as a birthday present. King used the guitar as his main guitar until the summer of 2009, when it was stolen. Traced through a Las Vegas pawnshop, the instrument was returned to King in late November 2009.

== See also ==
- List of guitars
