= Ron Levy =

American blues keyboardist and composer (born 1951)

- Born: Reuvin Zev ben Yehoshua Ha Levi; May 29, 1951 (age 74); Brookline, Massachusetts, U.S.
- Origin: Boston, Massachusetts, U.S.
- Genres: Blues, funk, jazz
- Occupations: Musician, composer
- Instruments: Piano, organ
- Years active: 1968–present
- Website: www.levtron.com

Ron Levy (born Reuvin Zev ben Yehoshua Ha Levi, May 29, 1951) is an American electric blues musician and composer.

Levy was born in Cambridge, Massachusetts, United States. He primarily plays piano and organ. Levy grew up in Brookline, Massachusetts, and began playing the piano after seeing Ray Charles in concert at age 13. He later switched to playing a Hammond organ. After gaining experience playing in Boston nightclubs, Levy was hired by Albert King in 1968. After an eighteen-month association, Levy joined B. B. King's backing band. Throughout the years, Levy has performed and recorded with a wide range of blues, funk, and jazz musical groups, notably including Roomful of Blues (1983 – 1987) and Ron Levy's Wild Kingdom (1988 – 2014).

After learning and refining his studio chops with Hammond Scott's Blacktop Records in New Orleans, Levy became the in-house record producer and co-founder, A&R for Rounder Records' Bullseye Blues record label, where he was nominated nine times for a Grammy Award as producer. He then recorded and produced 16 albums for his own label Cannonball Records from 1997 to 2000. He has since released numerous albums on his own imprint Levtron.com Records. Levy wrote in 2013 the book, Tales of A Road Dog - The Lowdown Along the Blues Highway (self-published by Levtron.com). Today, he teaches, records, produces and performs with his soul-jazz-blues Hammond organ based group, Ron Levy's Wild Kingdom Trio.

== Discography ==
- Ron Levy's Wild Kingdom (Black Top 1034, 1986)
- Safari to New Orleans (Black Top 1040, 1988)
- B-3 Blues and Grooves (Bullseye Blues 9532, 1993)
- Zim Zam Zoom: Acid Blues on B-3 (Bullseye Blues 9570, 1996)
- GreaZe is What's Good (Cannonball 27104, 1998)
- Ron Levy's Wild Kingdom Live! (Levtron 201, 2001)
- Green Eyed Soul (Levtron 202, 2002)
- Finding My Way (Levtron 203, 2003)
- After Midnight Grooves (Levtron 204, 2004)
- Best of Ron Levy's Wild Kingdom: B-3 Organic Grooves (Levtron 205, 2004) compilation of #201/202/203
- VooDoo BoogaLoo (Levtron 206, 2005)
- Funky Fiesta! (Levtron 207, 2012)

With B.B. King

- Live in Cook County Jail (ABC S-723, 1970; CD reissue: MCA 11769, 1998)
- Live in Japan (ABC-King [Japan] GW-131, 1971 [2LP]; CD reissue: MCA 11810, 1999)
- L.A. Midnight (ABC X-743, 1972; CD reissue: Beat Goes On/BGO 853, 2009)
- Guess Who (ABC X-759, 1972; CD reissue: MCA 10351, 1991)

With Earl King

- Glazed (Black Top 1035, 1986)

With Roomful of Blues

- Live at Lupo's Heartbreak Hotel (Varrick 024, 1987)
