= Gibson ES-355 =

Guitar produced by Gibson, 1958 to 1984

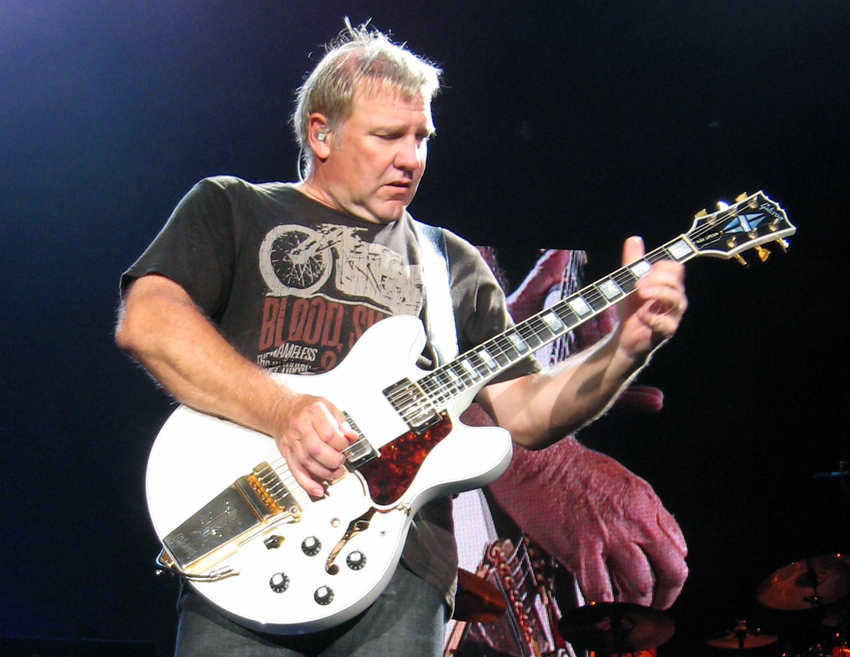
- Alex Lifeson of Rush playing a Gibson ES-355
- Manufacturer: Gibson Brands
- Period: 1958-1984, 2018 (Limited)

Construction
- Body type: semi-hollow body thinline
- Scale: 24.75"

Woods
- Body: Maple/Poplar
- Neck: Mahogany/Maple
- Fretboard: Ebony

Hardware
- Bridge: Tune-o-matic, TP-6
- Pickup: Humbuckers

Colors available
- Sunburst, Wine Red, Cherry, Walnut, and Natural

The Gibson ES-355 is the top of the line semi-hollow body Thinline Dual Pickup Stereo Varitone (TDSV) manufactured by the Gibson Guitar Company. The guitar is a stereo guitar with a varitone circuit and it was manufactured from 1958 to 1984. In 2018 Gibson began producing a version of the 355 again.

== History ==
The Gibson ES-355 was created to be the most high-end of the Gibson thinline semi-hollow guitars. The first 355 appeared in 1958 as a mono ES-355TD. The majority of the 355s were manufactured as stereo guitars labeled ES-355TD-SV. The manufacture of the stereo versions appeared in 1959. Many guitarists did not appreciate the varitone and they disconnected the option so that the guitar could be played in mono.

== Specifications ==
The guitar shipped in a mono version or a stereo version and it was the finest of the Gibson 300 series (ES-335, ES-345). The guitar is made with an ebony fingerboard and mother-of-pearl block inlays. Other high end appointments included a lyre vibrola (beginning circa 1963), gold hardware, triple binding on headstock and top, with single binding on back and neck. Many of the early versions of the guitar came with a Bigsby vibrato tailpiece. In 1960, Gibson offered a sideways vibrola option. The rarest version are the versions with the Stoptail bridge.

The top and back of the guitar is a laminate of maple and poplar, with a solid maple center block running from the neck to the bottom rim of the guitar. The neck is mahogany, and beginning in 1972, three piece maple. The tuners were either Grover Rotomatic, Kluson 'waffleback', or later in the 1970s, Schaller. The top of the guitar featured two F-holes, and the maple center block to limit feedback that was often experienced with hollow guitars. The 355 was made with two humbucker pickups. PAF in the 1950s, Patent # later in the 1960s, and T-Top pickups in the 1970s. Another extremely rare version of the 355 is the ES-355TDN; which has a natural or blonde finish.

== Reception ==
The guitar did not achieve the success that Gibson had hoped for. The ES-335 which was the stripped down version in the 300 series thinlines, was more popular. The 335 was lighter and simpler. The varitone circuit which was on the majority of 355s was not desired. Gibson ended production of the 355 in 1982. Gibson does produce a B.B. King Lucille model 355 and in 2008 produced an Alex Lifeson ES-355. In 2018 Gibson began producing an ES-355 with a Bigsby, an ES-355 in Walnut finish with a Maestro vibrola and an ES-355 Black Beauty (Limited to 100 units per version)

== Notable players ==
- Alex Lifeson
- B.B. King
- Chuck Berry
- Tito Jackson
- Keith Richards
- Noel Gallagher
- Johnny Marr
- Bernard Butler
