= There Is Always One More Time =

Studio album by B.B. King
- Released: 1991
- Studio: Conway, Los Angeles, California
- Genre: Blues
- Length: 46:03
- Label: MCA
- Producer: Stewart Levine

B.B. King chronology
Live at the Apollo (1991)	There Is Always One More Time (1991)	Blues Summit (1993)

There Is Always One More Time is an album by the American musician B.B. King, released in 1991. It is dedicated to Doc Pomus, who cowrote the title song. The first single was "Back in L.A."

King wrote in the liner notes that There Is Always One More Time was his best album.

== Production ==
The album was produced by Stewart Levine. Freddie Washington played bass; Jim Keltner played drums. Joe Sample wrote most of the songs. The title track contains a four-minute guitar solo. King chose to incorporate gospel elements in many of the songs.

== Critical reception ==
Professional ratings
Review scores
Source	Rating
AllMusic	4/5 stars
Calgary Herald	B+
Chicago Tribune	3.5/4 stars
The Penguin Guide to Blues Recordings	2.5/4 stars
The San Diego Union-Tribune	3.5/4 stars
Windsor Star	B+

The New York Times wrote that "until the gospelly title song, both Mr. King's voice and guitar are obscured by horns [sic], keyboards, backup vocals and booming drums; the album needs a remix to eliminate clutter and sweetening." The Calgary Herald stated that King "comes back with a bluesy sashay that's contemporary and comfortable."

The Toronto Star deemed the album "nice, laid-back blues." Ebony concluded that "the gritty 'Mean and Evil' reflects his Mississippi upbringing, while the moving, melancholy title song is sure to be a blues classic." The Chicago Tribune called "The Lowdown" "a classic after-hours blues, tailor-made for King's impassioned vocals."

== Track listing ==
All tracks composed by Joe Sample and Will Jennings; except where indicated

1. "I'm Moving On" — 4:15
2. "Back in L.A." — 5:00
3. "The Blues Come over Me" — 5:13
4. "Fool Me Once" — 4:18
5. "The Lowdown" — 4:11
6. "Mean and Evil" (Arthur Adams) — 4:20
7. "Something up My Sleeve" (Arthur Adams) — 4:27
8. "Roll, Roll, Roll" — 5:57
9. "There Is Always One More Time" (Doc Pomus, Ken Hirsch) — 8:26

== Personnel ==
- B.B. King – vocals, lead guitar
- Arthur Adams, Michael Landau – guitar
- Freddie Washington – bass guitar
- Joe Sample – piano
- Neil Larsen – keyboards, Hammond organ
- Jim Keltner – drums
- Lenny Castro – percussion
- Bunny Hull, Paulette Brown, Valerie Pinkston-Mayo – background vocals
