= B. B. King =

American blues guitarist, singer, and songwriter (1925–2015)

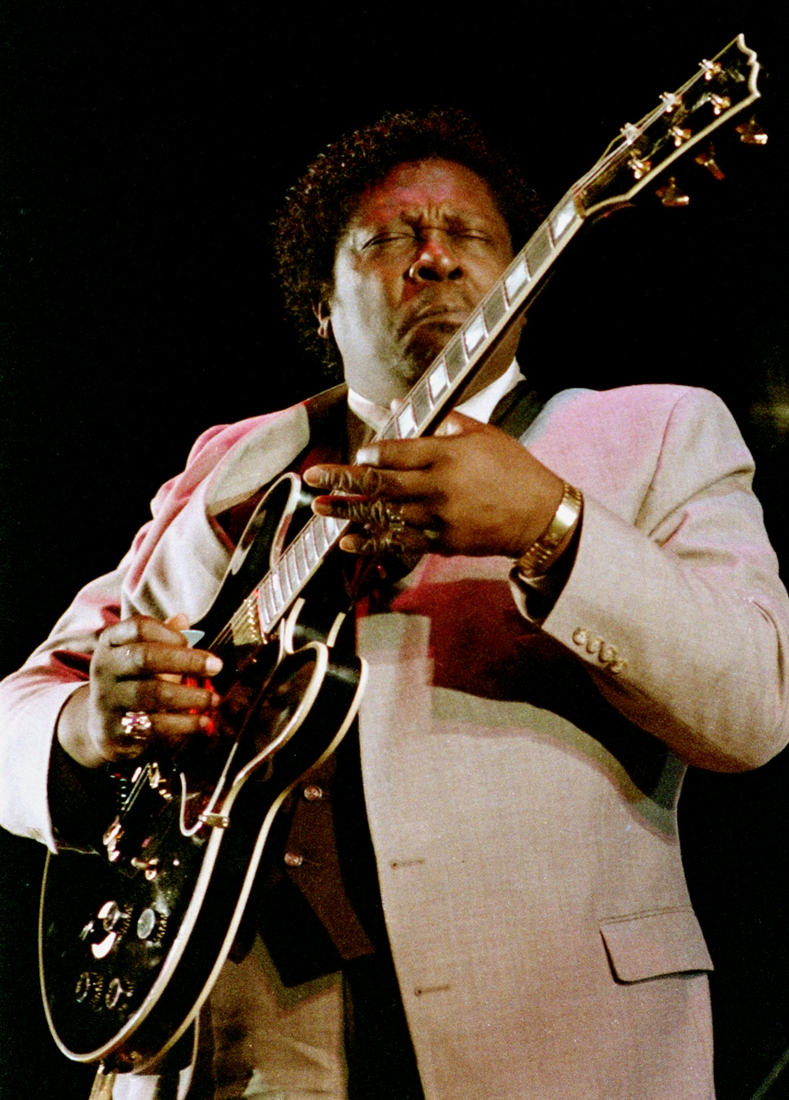
- King in 1984

Background information
- Born: Riley B. King; September 16, 1925 near Itta Bena, Mississippi, U.S.
- Died: May 14, 2015 (aged 89) Las Vegas, Nevada, U.S.
- Genres: Electric blues; Delta blues; Memphis blues; rhythm and blues; blues rock; rock and roll; soul; gospel
- Occupations: Musician; singer; songwriter; record producer
- Instruments: Guitar; vocals
- Years active: 1942–2014
- Labels: RPM; Crown; Kent; ABC; BluesWay; MCA; Geffen
- Website: bbking.com

Riley B. King (September 16, 1925 – May 14, 2015), known professionally as B. B. King, was an American blues guitarist, singer, songwriter, and record producer. He introduced a sophisticated style of soloing based on fluid string bending, shimmering vibrato, and staccato picking that influenced many later electric guitar blues players. AllMusic recognized King as "the single most important electric guitarist of the last half of the 20th century".

King was inducted into the Rock and Roll Hall of Fame in 1987 and is one of the most influential blues musicians in history, earning the nickname "The King of the Blues", and is referred to as one of the "Three Kings of the Blues Guitar" (along with Albert King and Freddie King, none of whom are related). King performed tirelessly throughout his musical career, appearing on average at more than 200 concerts a year into his 70s. In 1956 alone, he appeared at 342 shows.

Born and raised in the Mississippi Delta, King was attracted to music and taught himself to play guitar, beginning his career in juke joints and on local radio. King later lived and performed in Memphis and Chicago. As his fame grew, he toured the world extensively.

== Early life ==
Riley B. King was born on September 16, 1925, on a cotton plantation in Berclair named Bear Creek in Leflore County near the city of Itta Bena, Mississippi, the son of sharecroppers Albert and Nora Ella King. When he was four years old, his mother left his father for another man, so he was raised by his maternal grandmother, Elnora Farr, in Kilmichael, Mississippi, then in Lexington. As a teen, he moved to Indianola which he referred to as his hometown, later working at a cotton gin.

While young, King sang in the gospel choir at Elkhorn Baptist Church in Kilmichael. He was attracted to the Pentecostal Church of God in Christ because of its music. The local minister performed with a Sears Roebuck Silvertone guitar during services and taught King his first three chords. Flake Cartledge, his employer in Kilmichael, bought him his first guitar for 15 dollars. Cartledge withheld money from King's salary for the next two months until he repaid the debt.

In November 1941, King Biscuit Time first aired, broadcasting on KFFA in Helena, Arkansas. It was a radio show featuring the Mississippi Delta blues. King listened to it while on break at the plantation. A self-taught guitarist, he then wanted to be a radio musician.

In 1943, King left Kilmichael to work as a tractor driver and play guitar with the Famous St. John's Gospel Singers of Inverness, Mississippi, performing at area churches and on WGRM in Greenwood. He served in the U.S. Army during World War II but was released after being ruled as "essential to the war economy" based on his experience as a tractor driver.

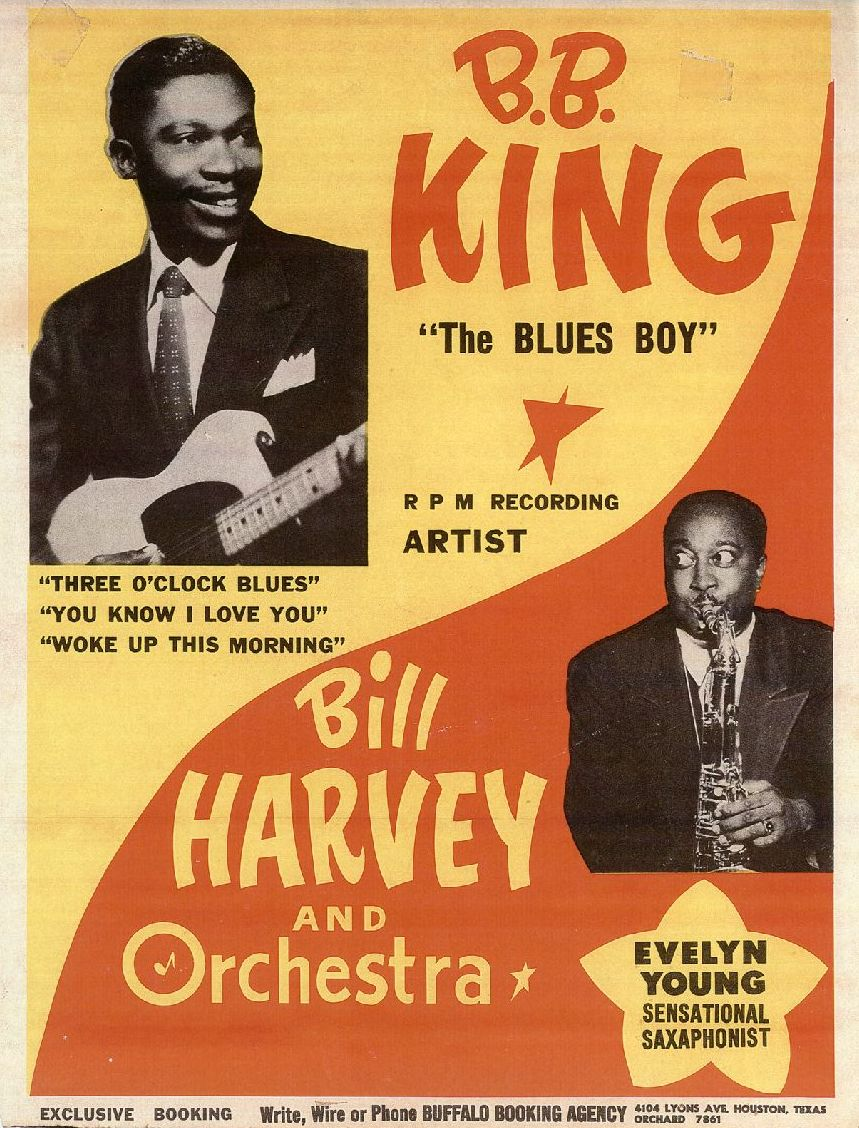
Poster of B. B. King and Bill Harvey and Orchestra with a photo of King holding his guitar and Evelyn Young playing saxophone

In 1946, he followed his cousin Bukka White to Memphis, Tennessee. White took him in for the next ten months. King returned shortly afterward to Mississippi where he better prepared himself for the next visit. Two years later, he returned to West Memphis, Arkansas. He performed on Sonny Boy Williamson's radio program on KWEM in West Memphis where he began to develop an audience. His appearances led to steady engagements at the Sixteenth Avenue Grill in West Memphis and later to a ten minute spot on the Memphis radio station WDIA. The radio spot became so popular that it was expanded and became the Sepia Swing Club.

He worked at WDIA as a singer and disc jockey where he was given the nickname "Beale Street Blues Boy", later shortened to "Blues Boy" and finally to "B. B." It was there that he first met T-Bone Walker. King said, "Once I'd heard him for the first time, I knew I'd have to have [an electric guitar] myself. 'Had' to have one, short of stealing!"

== Career ==
=== 1949–2005 ===
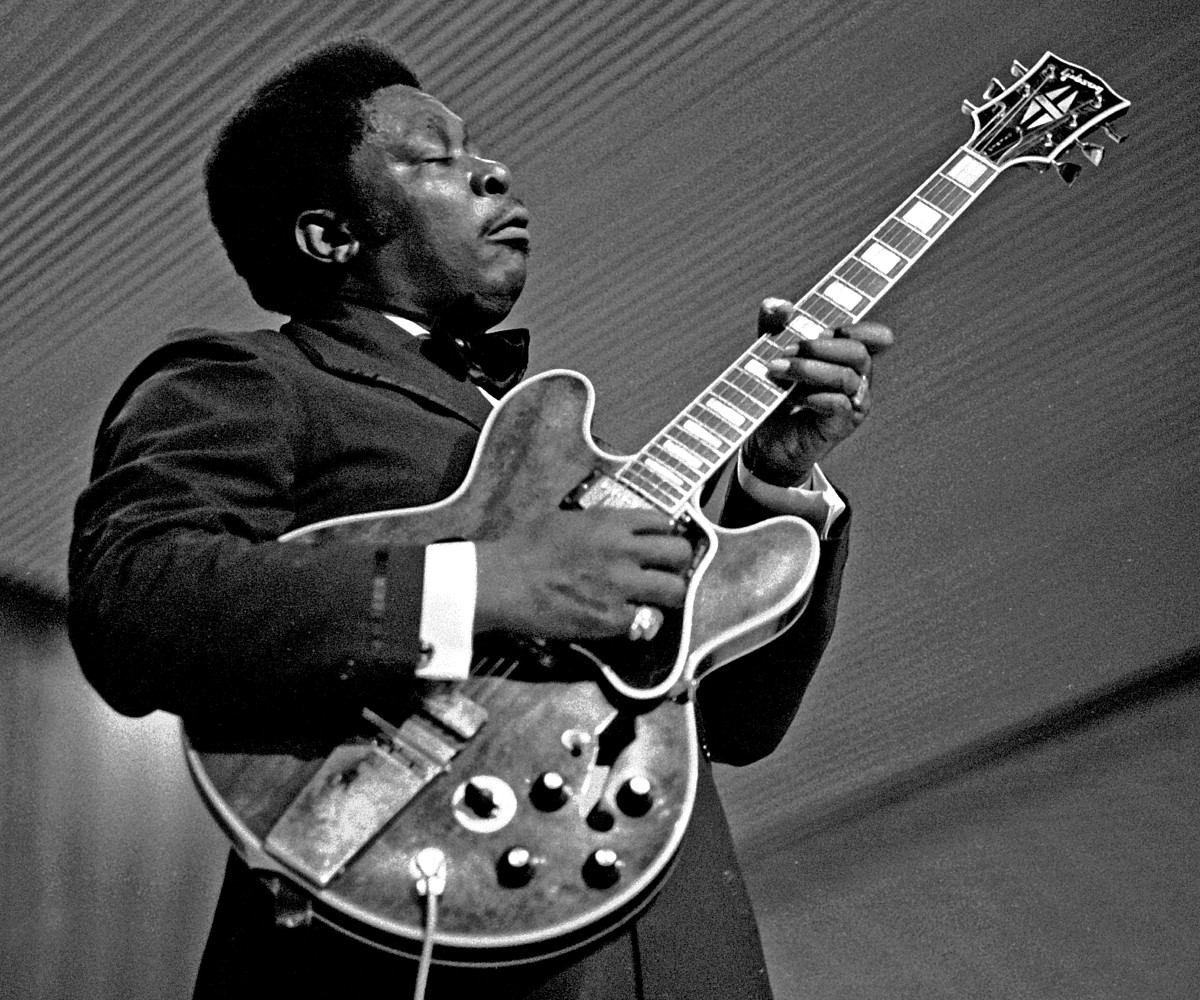
King on stage in Hamburg 1971

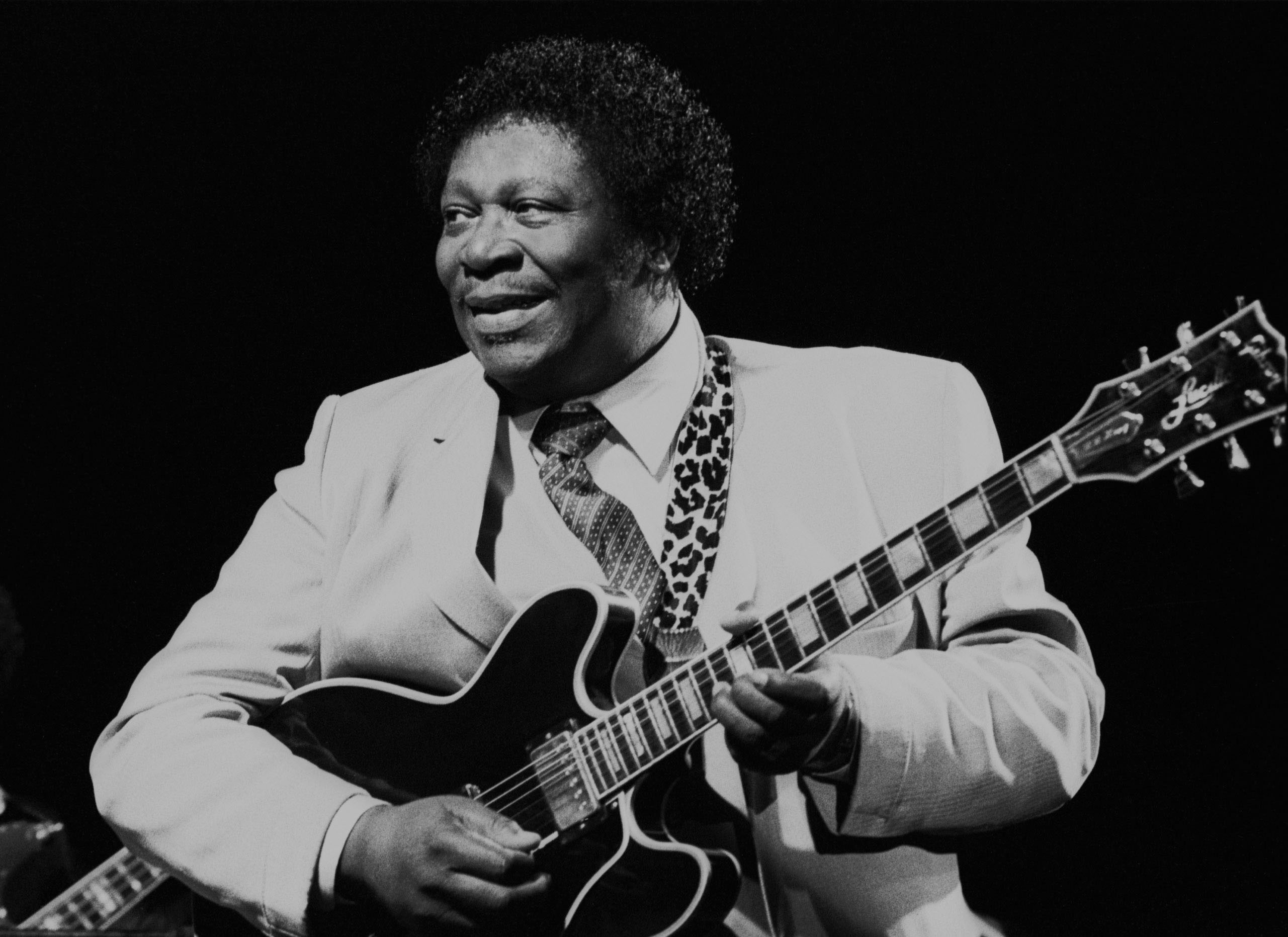
King in 1985

In the late 1940s and early 1950s, King was a part of the blues scene on Beale Street. "Beale Street was where it all started for me," he said. He performed with Bobby Bland, Johnny Ace and Earl Forest in a group known as the Beale Streeters.

According to King and Joe Bihari, one of the founders of Modern Records and its subsidiaries, Ike Turner introduced King to the Bihari brothers while he was a talent scout for them. Before his RPM contract, King had debuted on Bullet Records by issuing the single "Miss Martha King" (1949), which did not chart well. "My very first recordings [in 1949] were for a company out of Nashville called Bullet, the Bullet Record Transcription company," King recalled. "I had horns that very first session. I had Phineas Newborn on piano; his father played drums, and his brother, Calvin, played guitar with me. I had Tuff Green on bass, Ben Branch on tenor sax, his brother, Thomas, on trumpet, and a lady trombone player. The Newborn family were the house band at the famous Plantation Inn in West Memphis." In 1949, King began recording songs under contract with Los Angeles-based RPM Records, a subsidiary of Modern. Sam Phillips, who later founded Sun Records, produced many of King's early recordings.

King assembled his band, the B.B. King Review, under the leadership of Millard Lee. The band initially consisted of native-Houston trumpet player Calvin Owens and Kenneth Sands (also trumpet), Lawrence Burdin (alto saxophone), George Coleman (tenor saxophone), Floyd Newman (baritone saxophone), Millard Lee (piano), George Joyner (bass) and Earl Forest and Ted Curry (drums). King hired Onzie Horne, a trained musician, to be an arranger and assist him with his compositions. By his admission, King could not play chords well and always relied on improvisation.

King supported his recordings by touring across the United States with performances in major theaters in cities such as Washington, D.C., Chicago, Los Angeles, Detroit, and St. Louis, as well as numerous gigs in small clubs and juke joints in the southern United States. During one show in Twist, Arkansas, a brawl broke out between two men and caused a fire. He left the building with the rest of the crowd but ran back in to get his guitar. He said he later learned that the two men were fighting over a woman named Lucille. He named the guitar Lucille as a reminder not to fight over women, or run into any more burning buildings.

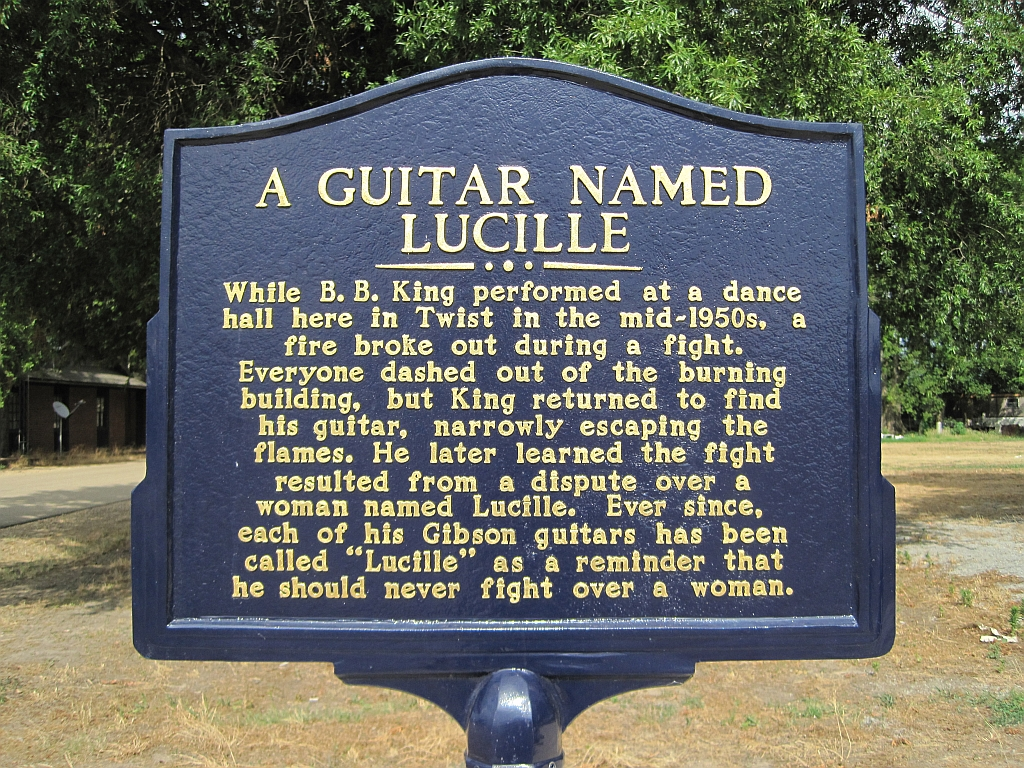
The story of a guitar named Lucille

Following his first Billboard Rhythm and Blues charted number one, "3 O'Clock Blues" (February 1952), King became one of the most important names in R&B music in the 1950s, amassing an impressive list of hits including "You Know I Love You", "Woke Up This Morning", "Please Love Me", "When My Heart Beats Like a Hammer", "Whole Lotta' Love", "You Upset Me Baby", "Every Day I Have the Blues", "Sneakin' Around", "Ten Long Years", "Bad Luck", "Sweet Little Angel", "On My Word of Honor", and "Please Accept My Love". This led to a significant increase in his weekly earnings, from about $85 to $2,500, with appearances at major venues such as the Howard Theater in Washington and the Apollo in New York, as well as touring the "Chitlin' Circuit". 1956 became a record-breaking year, with 342 concerts booked and three recording sessions. That same year he founded his own record label, Blues Boys Kingdom, with headquarters at Beale Street in Memphis. There, among other projects, he was a producer for artists such as Millard Lee and Levi Seabury. In 1962, King signed to ABC-Paramount Records, which was later absorbed into MCA Records (which itself was later absorbed into Geffen Records). In November 1964, King recorded the Live at the Regal album at the Regal Theater. King later said that Regal Live "is considered by some the best recording I've ever had ... that particular day in Chicago everything came together."

From the late 1960s, his new manager, Sid Seidenberg, pushed him into a different type of venue as blues-rock performers like Eric Clapton (once a member of the Yardbirds and Cream) and Paul Butterfield were bringing blues music to appreciative white audiences. King gained further visibility among rock audiences as an opening act on the Rolling Stones' 1969 American Tour. He won a Grammy Award in 1970 for his version of the song "The Thrill Is Gone" which was a hit on both the Pop and R&B charts. Rolling Stone magazine listed it in the number 183 spot in their 500 Greatest Songs of All Time.

King was inducted into the Blues Hall of Fame in 1980, the Rock and Roll Hall of Fame in 1987, and the National Rhythm & Blues Hall of Fame in 2014. In 2004, he was awarded the international Polar Music Prize which is given to artists "in recognition of exceptional achievements in the creation and advancement of music."

From the 1980s to his death in 2015, he maintained a highly visible and active career, appearing on numerous television shows and sometimes performing 300 nights a year. In 1988, he reached a new generation of fans with the single "When Love Comes to Town", a collaborative effort with the Irish band U2 on their Rattle and Hum album. In December 1997, he performed in the Vatican's fifth annual Christmas concert and presented his trademark guitar "Lucille" to Pope John Paul II. In 1998, King appeared in The Blues Brothers 2000, playing the part of the lead singer of the Louisiana Gator Boys along with Eric Clapton, Dr. John, Koko Taylor and Bo Diddley. In 2000, he and Clapton teamed up again to record Riding With the King which won a Grammy Award for Best Traditional Blues Album.

Discussing where he took the Blues, from "dirt floor, smoke in the air" joints to grand concert halls, King said the Blues belonged everywhere beautiful music belonged. He successfully worked both sides of the commercial divide, with sophisticated recordings and "raw, raucous" live performances.

=== 2006–2014 ===
In 2006, King went on a farewell world tour although he remained active afterward. The tour was partly supported by Northern Irish guitarist, Gary Moore, with whom King had previously toured and recorded. It started in the United Kingdom and continued with performances at the Montreux Jazz Festival and in Zürich at the Blues at Sunset. During his show in Montreux at the Stravinski Hall, he jammed with Joe Sample, Randy Crawford, David Sanborn, Gladys Knight, Leela James, Andre Beeka, Earl Thomas, Stanley Clarke, John McLaughlin, Barbara Hendricks and George Duke.

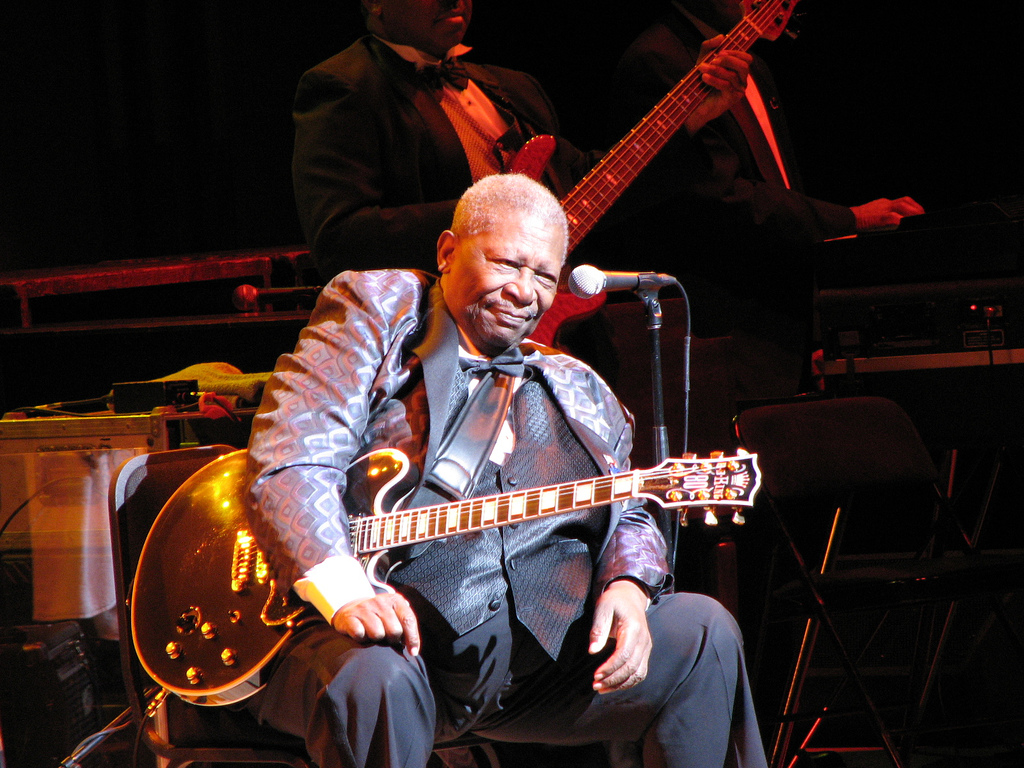
King at Roy Thomson Hall, Toronto, in May 2007

In June 2006, King was present at a memorial of his first radio broadcast at the Three Deuces Building in Greenwood, Mississippi where the Mississippi Blues Commission erected an official marker as part of the Mississippi Blues Trail. The same month, a groundbreaking was held for a new museum, dedicated to him, in Indianola, Mississippi. The B.B. King Museum and Delta Interpretive Center opened on September 13, 2008.

In late October 2006, King recorded a concert album and video entitled B.B. King: Live at his B.B. King Blues Clubs in Nashville and Memphis. The video of the four night production featured his regular band and captured his shows as he performed them nightly around the world. Released in 2008, they were his first performances in more than a decade to be documented with a live album release.

In 2007, King played at Eric Clapton's second Crossroads Guitar Festival and contributed the songs "Goin' Home", to Goin' Home: A Tribute to Fats Domino (with Ivan Neville's DumpstaPhunk) and "One Shoe Blues" to Sandra Boynton's children's album Blue Moo, accompanied by a pair of sock puppets in a music video for the song.

In the summer of 2008, King played at the Bonnaroo Music and Arts Festival in Manchester, Tennessee where he was given a key to the city. Later that year, he was inducted into the Hollywood Bowl Hall of Fame.

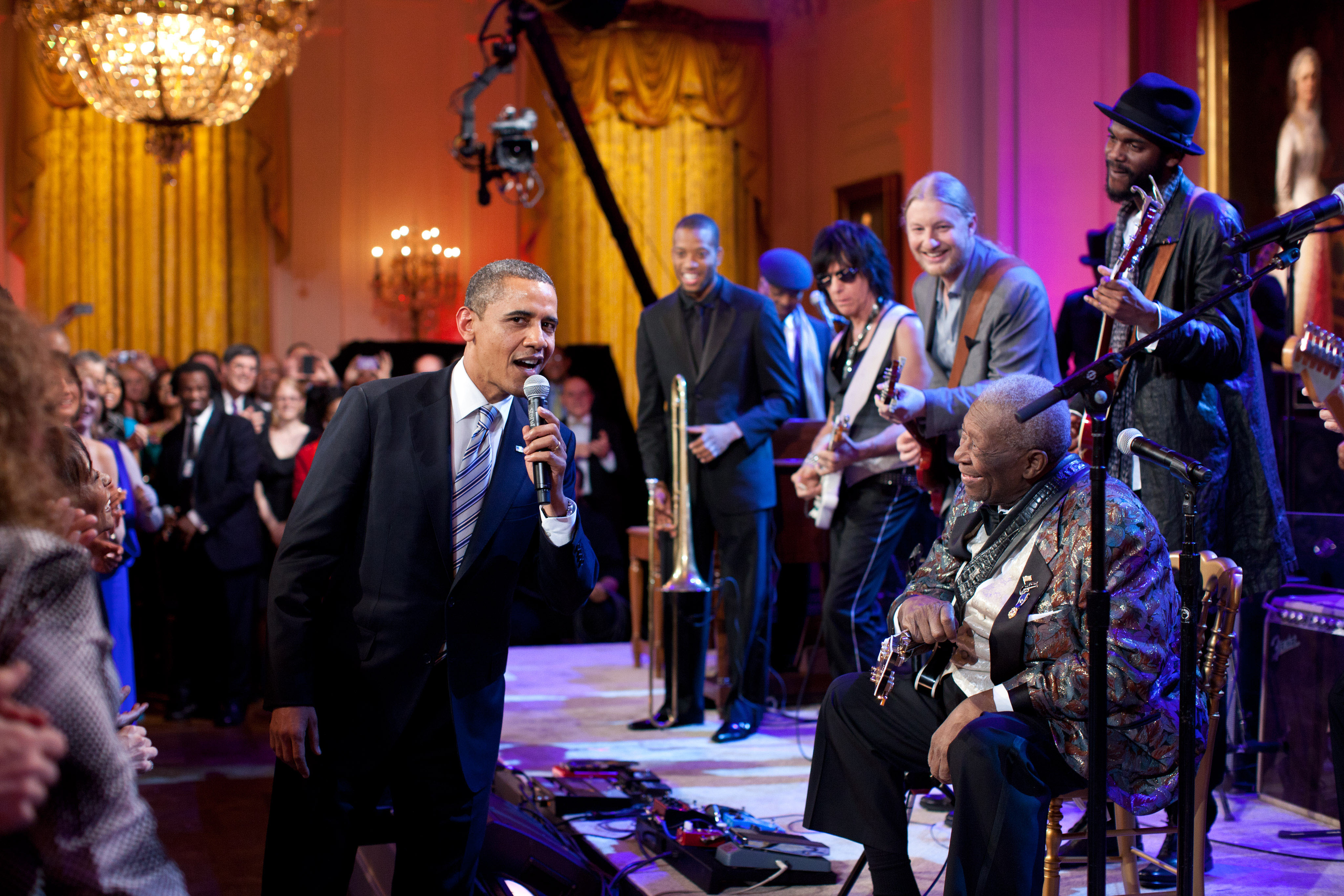
President Obama and King singing "Sweet Home Chicago" on February 21, 2012

He performed at the Mawazine festival in Rabat, Morocco on May 27, 2010. In June 2010, he played at the Crossroads Guitar Festival with Robert Cray, Jimmie Vaughan, and Eric Clapton. He also contributed to Cyndi Lauper's album Memphis Blues, which was released on June 22, 2010.

In 2011, King played at the Glastonbury Music Festival, and in the Royal Albert Hall in London where he recorded a concert video.

Rolling Stone ranked him at No. 6 on its 2011 list of the 100 greatest guitarists of all time.

On February 21, 2012, King was among the performers of "In Performance at the White House: Red, White and Blues" during which President Barack Obama sang part of "Sweet Home Chicago". King recorded for the debut album of rapper and producer Big K.R.I.T. who also hails from Mississippi. On July 5, 2012, King performed a concert at the Byblos International Festival in Lebanon.

On May 26, 2013, he appeared at the New Orleans Jazz Festival.

On October 3, 2014, after completing his live performance at the House of Blues in Chicago, a doctor diagnosed King with dehydration and exhaustion and the eight remaining shows of his ongoing tour had to be canceled. King did not reschedule the shows, and the House of Blues show would be the last before he died in 2015.

== Equipment ==
When I sing, I play in my mind; the minute I stop singing orally, I start to sing by playing Lucille.

King used equipment characteristic of the different periods he played in. He played guitars made by various manufacturers early in his career. He played a Fender Esquire on most of his recordings with RPM Records. Later, he was best known for playing variants of the Gibson ES-355.

In the September edition 1995 of Vintage Guitar magazine, early photos show him playing a Gibson ES-5 through a Fender tweed amp. In reference to the photo, King stated, "Yes; the old Fender amplifiers were the best that were ever made, in my opinion. They had a good sound and they were durable; guys would throw them in the truck and they'd hold up. They had tubes, and they'd get real hot, but they just had a sound that is hard to put into words. The Fender Twin was great, but I have an old Lab Series amp that isn't being made anymore. I fell in love with it because its sound is right between the old Fender amps that we used to have and the Fender Twin. It's what I'm using tonight."

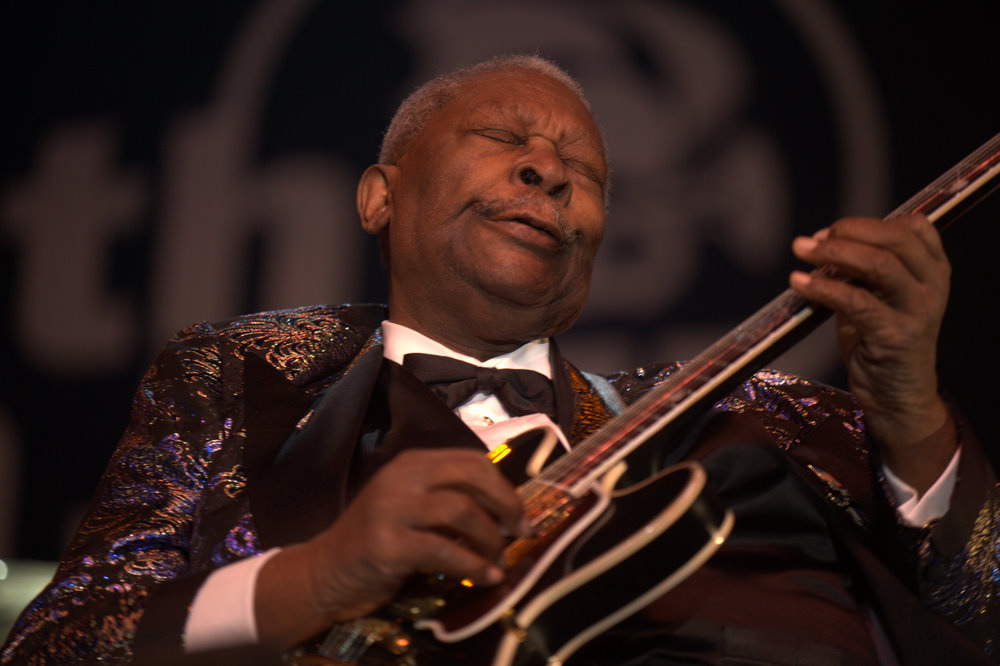
King at the 2009 North Sea Jazz Festival

He moved on from the larger Gibson hollow bodied instruments which were prone to feedback when played at high volumes to various semi-hollow models beginning first with the ES-335 and then on to a deluxe version called the ES-355 which used a stereo option. In 1980, Gibson Guitar Corporation launched the B.B. King Lucille model, an ES-355 with stereo options, a varitone selector, and fine tuners (neither of which he actually used ) and, at King's direct request, no f-holes to further reduce feedback. In 2005, Gibson made a special run of 80 Gibson Lucilles, referred to as the "80th Birthday Lucille", the first prototype of which they gave him as a birthday gift and which he used thereafter.

He used a Lab Series L5 2×12" combo amplifier and used this amplifier for a long time. Norlin Industries made them for Gibson in the 1970s and 1980s. Other popular L5 users are Allan Holdsworth and Ty Tabor of King's X. The L5 has an onboard compressor, parametric equalization, and four inputs. King also used a Fender Twin Reverb.

He used his signature model strings "Gibson SEG-BBS B.B. King Signature Electric Guitar Strings" with gauges: 10–13–17p–32w–45w–54w and D'Andrea 351 MD SHL CX (medium 0.71mm, tortoiseshell, celluloid) picks.

== Blues clubs ==
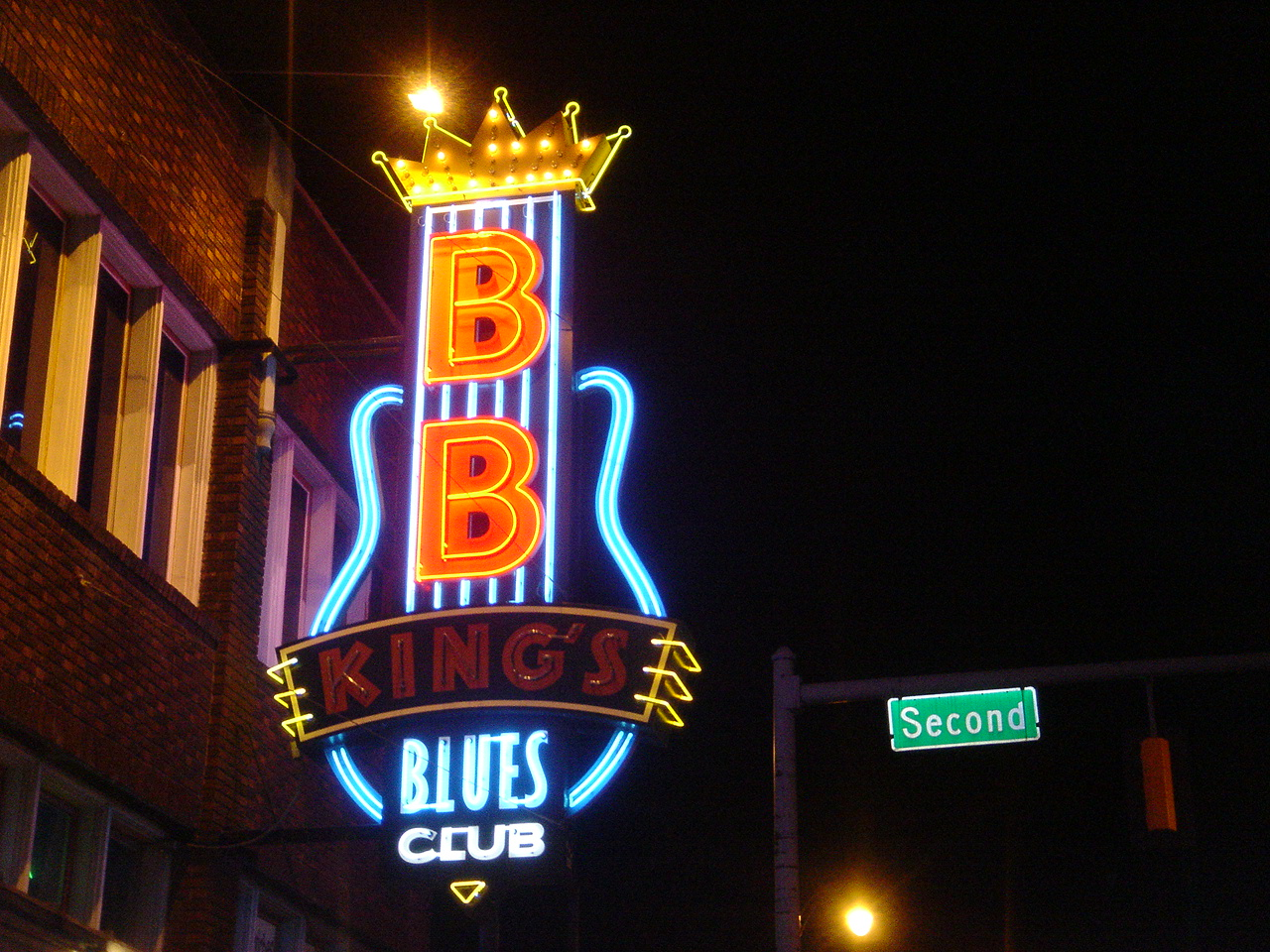
Sign outside B.B. King's Blues Club on Beale Street, Memphis

In 1991, Beale Street developer John Elkington recruited King to open the original B.B. King's Blues Club in Memphis and in 1994, they launched a second club at Universal CityWalk in Los Angeles. A third club in New York City's Times Square opened in June 2000 but closed on April 29, 2018. Management is looking for a new location in New York City. Two more clubs opened, at Foxwoods Casino in Connecticut in January 2002, and in Nashville in 2003. Another club opened in Orlando in 2007. A club in West Palm Beach opened in the fall of 2009 and an additional one, based in the Mirage Hotel, Las Vegas, opened in the winter of 2009. Another opened in the New Orleans French Quarter in 2016.

In 2008, King purchased Club Ebony, a juke joint he frequented throughout his career located in Indianola, Mississippi. The venue was restored and is now part of the B.B. King Museum.

== Television and other appearances ==
King made guest appearances on a number of popular television shows including: The Cosby Show, The Tonight Show Starring Johnny Carson, The Young and the Restless, General Hospital, The Fresh Prince of Bel-Air, Sesame Street, Married... with Children, Sanford and Son and Touched by an Angel.

King also made an appearance in the 1985 movie, Spies Like Us.

From the mid-1980s until the mid-1990s, he appeared in several advertisements for McDonald's. In the early 2000s, he also appeared in a campaign for Burger King.

In 2000, the children's show Between the Lions featured a singing character named "B.B. the King of Beasts" based on him.

B.B. King: The Life of Riley, a feature documentary about him narrated by Morgan Freeman and directed by Jon Brewer, was released on October 15, 2012. After King's death Brewer produced and directed B.B. King: On the Road (2018), in which former band members like Ron Levy, Calvin Owens, Floyd Newman, Duke Jethro, Tony Coleman, Walter King and James "Boogaloo" Bolden remember his life and music, alongside archival footage of concerts, touring etc., interviews with King, his second wife Sue Evans, managers (Sidney A. Seidenberg and Tina France), producers (Joe Bihari, Bill Szymczyk, Stewart Levine) and statements of other musicians who had played with him, such as Bobby Bland, Buddy Guy, Eric Clapton, Johnny Winter, Ringo Starr and Susan Tedeschi.

His performance at the 1969 Harlem Cultural Festival appears in the 2021 music documentary Summer of Soul.

== Personal life ==
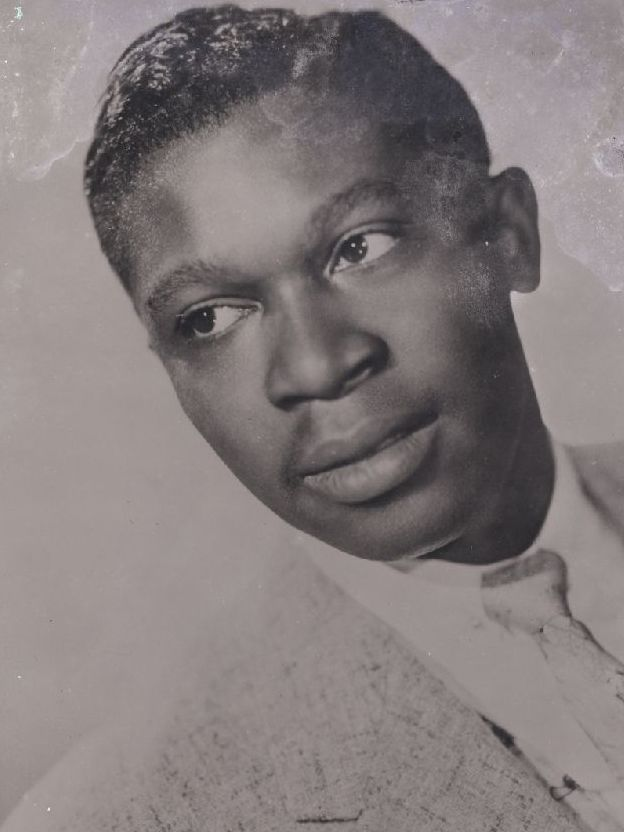
Early publicity photo of King

King was married twice. His first marriage was to Martha Lee Denton, from November 1946 to 1952, and his second was to Sue Carol Hall, from 1958 to 1966. He attributed their failure to the heavy demands of his 250 performances a year. It is said that he fathered 15 children with several women. After his death, three more have come forward, claiming him as their father. Neither of his marriages produced children, and biographer Charles Sawyer wrote that doctors found his sperm count too low to conceive children, but King never disputed paternity of any of the 15 who claimed it and by all accounts was generous in bankrolling college tuitions and establishing trust funds. In May 2016, the 11 surviving children initiated legal proceedings against his appointed trustee over his estimated $30 million to $40 million estate. Several of them also went public with the allegation that King's business manager, LaVerne Toney, and his personal assistant, Myron Johnson, had fatally poisoned him. Autopsy results showed no evidence of poisoning. A defamation suit filed by Johnson against the accusing family members (including his own sister, Karen Williams) is pending. Other children have filed lawsuits targeting his music estate, which remains in dispute.

King was an FAA-certified private pilot and frequently flew to gigs. He learned to fly in 1963 at what was then Chicago Hammond Airport in Lansing, Illinois. In 1995 his insurance company and manager asked him, at around the age of 70, to fly only with another certified pilot, so he stopped flying.

King's favorite singer was Frank Sinatra. In his autobiography, he spoke about how he was a "Sinatra nut" and went to bed every night listening to Sinatra's classic album In the Wee Small Hours. During the 1960s, Sinatra had arranged for King to play at the main clubs in Las Vegas. He credited Sinatra for opening doors to black entertainers who were not given the chance to play in white-dominated venues.

=== Philanthropy and notable campaigns ===
King recorded Live in Cook County Jail in September 1970, a time when issues of racism and class in the prison system were prominent in politics. King co-founded the Foundation for the Advancement of Inmate Rehabilitation and Recreation, tying in his support for prisoners and his interest in prison reform. He also wanted to use prison performances as a way to preserve music and songs, similar to what Alan Lomax did.

In 2002, he signed on as an official supporter of Little Kids Rock, a nonprofit organization that provides free musical instruments and instruction to children in underprivileged public schools throughout the United States. He sat on the organization's honorary board of directors.

Diagnosed with diabetes in 1990, King was a high-profile spokesman in the fight against the disease. He appeared in several television commercials for OneTouch Ultra, a blood glucose monitoring device, beginning in the early 2000s. American Idol contestant Crystal Bowersox, who was diagnosed with diabetes at age six, co-starred with King in later commercials.

== Death and funeral ==
The last eight shows of his 2014 tour were canceled because of health problems caused by complications from high blood pressure and diabetes. On May 14, 2015, at the age of 89, King died in his sleep from vascular dementia caused by a series of small strokes as a consequence of his type 2 diabetes. Two of his daughters alleged that he was deliberately poisoned by two associates trying to induce diabetic shock; an autopsy showed no evidence of that.

King's body was flown to Memphis on May 27, 2015. A funeral procession went down Beale Street with a brass band marching in front of the hearse while playing "When the Saints Go Marching In". Thousands lined the streets to pay their last respects. His body was then driven down Route 61 to his hometown of Indianola, Mississippi. He was laid in repose at the B.B. King Museum and Delta Interpretive Center in Indianola so people could view his open casket. The funeral took place at the Bell Grove Missionary Baptist Church in Indianola on May 30. He was buried at the B.B. King Museum.

== Discography ==
=== Studio albums ===
- Singin' the Blues (1957)
- The Blues (1958)
- B.B. King Wails (1959)
- King of the Blues (1960)
- Sings Spirituals (1960)
- The Great B.B. King (1960)
- My Kind of Blues (1961)
- Blues for Me (1961)
- Blues in My Heart (1962)
- Easy Listening Blues (1962)
- B.B. King (1963)
- Mr. Blues (1963)
- Confessin' the Blues (1966)
- Blues on Top of Blues (1968)
- Lucille (1968)
- Live & Well (1969)
- Completely Well (1969)
- Indianola Mississippi Seeds (1970)
- B.B. King in London (1971)
- L.A. Midnight (1972)
- Guess Who (1972)
- To Know You Is to Love You (1973)
- Lucille Talks Back (1975)
- King Size (1977)
- Midnight Believer (1978)
- Take It Home (1979)
- There Must Be a Better World Somewhere (1981)
- Love Me Tender (1982)
- Blues 'N' Jazz (1983)
- Six Silver Strings (1985)
- King of the Blues: 1989 (1988)
- There Is Always One More Time (1991)
- Blues Summit (1993)
- Lucille & Friends (1995)
- Deuces Wild (1997)
- Blues on the Bayou (1998)
- Let the Good Times Roll (1999)
- Makin' Love Is Good for You (2000)
- Riding with the King (2000, with Eric Clapton)
- A Christmas Celebration of Hope (2001)
- Reflections (2003)
- B.B. King & Friends: 80 (2005)
- One Kind Favor (2008)

== Accolades ==
=== Awards and nominations ===
Years reflect the year in which the Grammy was awarded, for music released in the previous year.

Grammy Awards
Year	Category	Work	Result
1970	Best Male R&B Vocal Performance	"The Thrill Is Gone"	Won
1981	Best R&B Instrumental Performance	"When I'm Wrong"	Nominated
1982	Best Ethnic or Traditional Recording	"There Must Be a Better World Somewhere"	Won
1983	Best R&B Performance by a Duo or Group with Vocals	"Street Life"	Nominated
1984	Best Traditional Blues Recording	Blues 'n Jazz	Won
1986	Best Traditional Blues Recording	My Guitar Sings the Blues	Won
1991	Best Traditional Blues Recording	Live at San Quentin	Won
1991	Best Country Collaboration with Vocals	"Waiting on the Light to Change"	Nominated
1992	Best Traditional Blues Album	Live at the Apollo	Won
1994	Best Traditional Blues Album	Blues Summit	Won
1995	Best Country Collaboration with Vocals	"Patches"	Nominated
1997	Best Rock Instrumental Performance	"SRV Shuffle"	Won
1999	Best Contemporary Blues Album	Deuces Wild	Nominated
2000	Best Traditional Blues Album	Blues on the Bayou	Won
2001	Best Traditional Blues Album	Riding with the King	Won
2001	Best Pop Collaboration with Vocals	"Is You Is or Is You Ain't (My Baby)"	Won
2003	Best Traditional Blues Album	A Christmas Celebration of Hope	Won
2003	Best Pop Instrumental Performance	"Auld Lang Syne"	Won
2005	Best Traditional R&B Performance	"Sinner's Prayer" (with Ray Charles)	Nominated
2006	Best Traditional Blues Album	B. B. King & Friends: 80	Won
2009	Best Traditional Blues Album	One Kind Favor	Won

Other awards

Year	Association	Category	Work	Result
1995	Country Music Association	Album of the Year	Rhythm, Country and Blues ("Patches" with George Jones)	Nominated
2002	NAACP Image Awards	Outstanding Performance in a Youth/Children's Series or Special	Sesame Street	Nominated

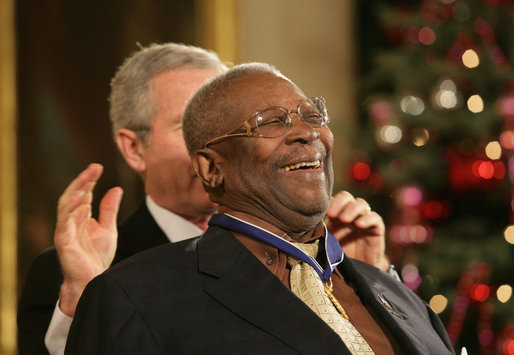
King receiving the Presidential Medal of Freedom from George W. Bush, December 2006

=== Additional honors ===
- Honorary Doctorate of Humanities from Tougaloo College (1973)
- Honorary Doctor of Music by Yale University (1977)
- Inducted into the Blues Hall of Fame (1980)
- Honorary Doctorate of Music from Berklee College of Music (1985)
- Inducted into the Rock & Roll Hall of Fame (1987)
- Grammy Lifetime Achievement Award (1987)
- The National Medal of Arts (1990)
- The National Heritage Fellowship from the NEA (1991)

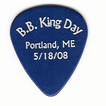
Commemorative guitar pick honoring "B.B. King Day" in Portland, Maine

- The Kennedy Center Honors – given to recognize "the lifelong accomplishments and extraordinary talents of our nation's most prestigious artists" (1995)
- Grammy Hall of Fame Award for "The Thrill is Gone" – given to recordings that are at least 25 years old and that have "qualitative or historical significance" (1998)
- The Library of Congress awarded him the Living Legend Medal for his lifetime of contributions to America's diverse cultural heritage (2000)
- The Royal Swedish Academy of Music awarded him the Polar Music Prize for his "significant contributions to the blues" (2004)
- The Golden Plate Award of the American Academy of Achievement (2004)
- The Presidential Medal of Freedom awarded by President George W. Bush on December 15 (2006)
- An honorary doctorate in music by Brown University (2007)
- The keys to the city of Portland, Maine (2008)
- A Mississippi Blues Trail marker was added for King to commemorate his birthplace (2008)
- Time named King No. 3 on its list of the 10 best electric guitarists (2009)
- King was awarded the MMP Music Award and inducted into the MMP Hall of Fame by the Mississippi Music Project (2018)
- A Google Doodle celebrated what would have been King's 94th birthday (2019)
- A King Homecoming Festival is held in Indianola, Mississippi during the first week in June every year. The event began as a way to celebrate the legacy of Medgar Evers.
- Rolling Stone named King the 8th greatest guitarist of all time in 2023.
- King is featured as one of the musicians in Mississippi's Rose Parade float for 2025.

== See also ==
- African Americans in Mississippi
- B.B. King's Bluesville
- Honorific nicknames in popular music
- List of nicknames of blues musicians
