= Live at San Quentin (B. B. King album) =

Live album by B.B. King
- Released: 1990
- Recorded: May 25, 1990
- Venue: San Quentin Prison
- Genre: Blues
- Length: 64:13
- Label: MCA
- Producer: Trade Martin

B.B. King chronology
King of the Blues: 1989 (1988)	Live at San Quentin (1990)	B.B. King and Sons Live (1990)

Professional ratings
Review scores
Source	Rating
AllMusic	1.5/5 stars
The Penguin Guide to Blues Recordings	2.5/4 stars
Select	3/5 medals

Live at San Quentin is a 1990 live album by blues guitarist B.B. King, performed at San Quentin State Prison in Marin County, California.

== Track listing ==
1. "B.B. King Intro" (Riley King)
2. "Let the Good Times Roll" (Sam Theard, Fleecie Moore)
3. "Every Day I Have the Blues" (Memphis Slim)
4. "Whole Lotta Loving" (Jules Bihari, Riley King)
5. "Sweet Little Angel" (Riley King, Jules Taub)
6. "Never Make a Move Too Soon" (Stix Hooper, Will Jennings)
7. "Into the Night" (Ira Newborn)
8. "Ain't Nobody's Bizness" (Porter Grainger, Everett Robbins)
9. "The Thrill is Gone" (Rick Darnell, Roy Hawkins)
10. "Peace to the World" (Trade Martin)
11. "Nobody Loves Me But My Mother" (Riley King)
12. "Sweet Sixteen" (Riley King, Joe Josea)
13. "Rock Me Baby" (Riley King, Joe Josea)

== Personnel ==
- Bass Guitar – Michael Doster
- Drums – Calep Emphrey
- Guitar – Leon Warren
- Keyboards – Eugene Carrier
- Lead Vocals, Guitar – B.B. King
- Musical Director, Saxophone – Walter King
- Saxophone – Edgar Synigal
- Trumpet – James Bolden
