= King of the Blues: 1989 =

Studio album by B. B. King
- Released: 1988
- Studios: The Village Recorder, CA "The Slammer", CA; Waterfront, NJ; Media Sound, NY; Memphis Sound; Ardent; Muscle Shoals, AL; Baby O, CA
- Genres: Blues, pop
- Length: 51:28
- Label: MCA
- Producers: Jerry Lynn Williams (all except noted); Al Kooper (2 & 6); Trade Martin (7 & 10); Frederick Knight (9 & 11)

B. B. King chronology
You Done Lost Your Good Thing Now (1987)	King of the Blues: 1989 (1988)	Live at San Quentin (1990)

King of the Blues: 1989 is an album by the American musician B. B. King, released in 1988. It was nominated for a Grammy Award for "Best Contemporary Blues Recording".

King supported the album with a North American tour, which was a hit due to his appearance in U2's Rattle and Hum. King was disappointed that the album and tour did not find much success with Black audiences.

== Production ==
Al Kooper was among the album's four producers. Many of the tracks used drum machines; King was an adopter of home computers and curious about modern studio technology. Steve Cropper played rhythm guitar. "Drowning in the Sea of Love" was written by Gamble and Huff. "Can't Get Enough" was King's favorite track.

== Critical reception ==
Professional ratings
Review scores
Source	Rating
AllMusic	2/5 stars
The Grove Press Guide to the Blues on CD	1/5 stars
MusicHound Rock: The Essential Album Guide	3/5 stars
The Penguin Guide to Blues Recordings	1/4 stars
The Rolling Stone Album Guide	3/5 stars

The Orlando Sentinel called the album a "bid for pop- crossover attention." The Calgary Herald wrote that "the songs are so mediocre as to actually give you the blues, and producer Al Kooper has drowned King's occasional stellar guitar work in a sea of keyboards and soulless drum programming." The Kingston Whig-Standard determined that the album "is very contemporary and could easily give Robert Cray a run for his money in the blues-pop-soul category." The Toronto Star labeled it "a bold, big electric blues album from the unassailable master of the field." The Vancouver Sun noted that King of the Blues: 1989 was "more structured and tight than previous albums."

AllMusic concluded: "Over-glossed R&B tracks, heavy doses of keyboards and drum programming are an ideal way to make albums for the pop charts, but for B.B. King, they are tools of disaster." King's biographer, Daniel de Vise, deemed the album perhaps "the low ebb of his recording career."

== Track listing ==
All tracks are written by Jerry Lynn Williams except where noted. Track 11 only on some CD versions.

No.	Title	Length
1.	"(You've Become a) Habit to Me"	4:45
2.	"Drowning in the Sea of Love" (Kenneth Gamble, Leon Huff)	4:36
3.	"Can't Get Enough"	4:50
4.	"Standing on the Edge"	5:19
5.	"Go On"	3:50
6.	"Let's Straighten It Out" (Benny Latimore)	5:35
7.	"Change in Your Lovin'" (Joe Amato, Trade Martin)	3:25
8.	"Undercover Man"	5:38
9.	"Lay Another Log on the Fire" (Frederick Knight)	4:00
10.	"Business with My Baby Tonight" (Jeff Rubin, Trade Martin)	3:35
11.	"Take Off Your Shoes" (Bettye Crutcher, Frederick Knight)	5:31

== Personnel ==
- B.B. King – vocals, lead guitar
  - Tracks produced by Jerry Lynn Williams:
- Jerry Lynn Williams – rhythm guitar, keyboards, backing vocals, drum programming (Tracks 1, 3-5, 8)
- Stevie Nicks – backing vocals (3)
- Mick Fleetwood – drums (3, 4, 8)
- Steve Cropper – rhythm guitar (4, 8)
- Marty Grebb – saxophone (3)
- Tom Scott – saxophone (4)
- Loralei Wehba – backing vocals (4, 5)
- Bonnie Raitt – backing vocals (5)
- Chris Mancini – backing vocals (8)
  - Tracks produced by Al Kooper:
- Al Kooper – all instruments except left side lead guitar (2, 6)
- The Jim Gilstrap Singers – backing vocals (2, 6)
  - Tracks produced by Trade Martin:
- Trade Martin – all rhythm instruments, backing vocals, mixing (7, 10)
- Rodney Kelly – computer programming (7, 10)
- Alfa Anderson, Liliana Pumpido, Joe Amato, Luci Martin, Alfredo Rios – backing vocals (7, 10)
- Randal Brecker, Alan Rubin, James Pugli, Ronnie Cuber, Robert Magnuson, Lou Marini – horns (7, 10)
- Joseph Malignaggi, Ethel Abelson, Ann Barsk, Maura Giannini, Anthony Posk, Carmel Malignaggi – violin (7, 10)
  - Tracks produced by Frederick Knight:
- Catherine Henderson, Jewell Bass, Tomasine Anderson – backing vocals (11)
- Ray Griffin – bass guitar (11)
- James Robinson – drums (11)
- Michael Toles & Michael Spriggs (11)
- The Muscle Shoals Horns – horns (11)
- Carson Whitsett, Clayton Ivey & Earnest Williamson – keyboards (11)

Technical

- Courtney Branch & Tracy Kendrick – remixing & additional production (1, 2, 3, 6, 7, 9)
- Chris Green – engineering (1, 3-5, 8)
- Charlie Brocco, Tom Beiner – assistant engineers (1, 3-5, 8)
- Jimmy Hotz – guitar programming (1, 3-5, 8)
- Richard "Fast Fingers" McIntosh, Rick Delana – engineering (2, 6)
- Chris Steinmetz – assistant engineer (2, 6)
- Doug Conroy – rhythm tracks & mixes (4, 8)
- Roger Rhoads – horns, vocals & strings (4, 8)
- Robert Jackson, John Fleskes, Roosevelt Green, Pete Green – engineering (9, 11)
- Steve Hall – mastering
- Sheila Wolk – artwork
