= B.B. King in London =

Studio album by B.B. King
- Released: 11 October 1971 (US); 19 November 1971 (UK)
- Recorded: June 9–16, 1971
- Studio: Olympic, Command Studios, London
- Genre: Blues
- Length: 34:24
- Label: ABC (US); Probe (UK)
- Producer: Ed Michell, Joe Zagarino

B.B. King chronology
Live in Cook County Jail (1971)	B.B. King in London (1971)	L.A. Midnight (1972)

B.B. King in London is a studio album, the nineteenth, by B.B. King, recorded in London in 1971. He is accompanied by US session musicians and various British rock- and R&B musicians, including Ringo Starr, Alexis Korner and Gary Wright, as well as members of Spooky Tooth and Humble Pie, Greg Ridley, Steve Marriott, and Jerry Shirley.

The album was released in the United Kingdom on November 19, 1971, in order to coincide with the first date of King's tour of the country.

John Lennon had announced that he would perform on some of the tracks, but ended up having no involvement with the album.

== Recording ==
In addition to playing keyboards on many tracks, Gary Wright also contributed his own composition "Wet Haystack". The track "Alexis Boogie" features Alexis Korner and three members of Humble Pie, and marked the first time B.B. King played acoustic guitar on an official recording.

Former Beatles drummer Ringo Starr played drums on three tracks. On two of these songs he performed in a twin-drum setup with Jim Gordon, while on "Part-Time Love" he was the sole drummer. John Lennon was also invited to participate in the sessions, but did not take part as he was living in New York at the time.

During the sessions at Command Studios, filming was carried out for a BBC documentary program, which was broadcast in 1972.

== Reception ==
Professional ratings
Review scores
Source	Rating
AllMusic	2/5 stars
Christgau's Record Guide	B
MusicHound Rock: The Essential Album Guide	2/5 stars
The Penguin Guide to Blues Recordings	2/4 stars
The Rolling Stone Album Guide	3/5 stars

In the United States, the album reached number 57 on the Billboard 200 and number 15 on Billboard's R&B Albums chart. The first single from the album, "Ghetto Woman", peaked at number 68 on the Billboard Hot 100 and number 25 on the R&B Singles chart, while the follow-up single, "Ain't Nobody Home", reached number 46 on the Hot 100 and number 28 on the R&B chart.

== Track listing ==
1. "Caldonia" (Fleecie Moore) -- 4:01
2. "Blue Shadows" (Lloyd Glenn) -- 5:11
3. "Alexis' Boogie" (Alexis Korner) -- 3:30
4. "We Can't Agree" (Wilhelmina Gray, Louis Jordan) -- 4:48
5. "Ghetto Woman" (Dave Clark, B.B. King) -- 5:15
6. "Wet Hayshark" [instrumental] (Gary Wright) -- 2:29
7. "Part-Time Love" (Clay Hammond) -- 3:17
8. "Power of the Blues" (Pete Wingfield) -- 2:23
9. "Ain't Nobody Home" (Jerry Ragovoy) -- 3:09

== Personnel ==
- B.B. King – guitar, vocals
- Peter Green – guitar on "Caldonia"
- Alexis Korner – guitar on "Alexis' Boogie"
- David Spinozza – guitar (track 9)
- John Uribe – guitar (tracks 2, 4, 9)
- Paul Butler – guitar
- Klaus Voormann – bass guitar
- John Best – bass guitar
- Greg Ridley – bass guitar on "Alexis' Boogie"
- Steve Winwood – Hammond organ
- Gary Wright – piano, Hammond organ
- Dr Ragovoy – piano
- Pete Wingfield – piano
- Dr. John – keyboards (and guitar on track 5)
- Rick Wright – keyboards
- Joshie Armstead – background vocals
- Tasha Thomas – background vocals
- Carl Hall – background vocals
- Steve Marriott – harmonica on "Alexis' Boogie"
- Duster Bennett – harmonica
- Ollie Mitchell – trumpet
- Chuck Findley – trombone
- Jim Price – trumpet, trombone, piano, Fender Rhodes
- Bobby Keys – tenor saxophone
- Bill Perkins – baritone saxophone, clarinet
- Ringo Starr – drums (tracks 5, 6, 7)
- Jerry Shirley – drums on "Alexis' Boogie"
- Jim Gordon – drums
- Jim Keltner – drums
- Barry Ford – drums
- Jimmie Haskell – string arrangement, conductor on "Ghetto Woman"

Technical

- Andy Hendriksen, Baker Bigsby, Chris Kimsey, Eddie James, Joe Venneri, John Stronach, Lee Kiefer, Pete Booth, Phillip Holland, Rufus Cartwright, Tom Brown – engineer
- Keith Morris – photography
