= James "Boogaloo" Bolden =

American singer-songwriter (born 1950)

- Born: James Bolden; February 9, 1950 (age 76); Houston, Texas, U.S.
- Origin: Missouri City, Texas, U.S.
- Genres: Blues, R&B, electric blues, blues rock
- Occupations: Musician, singer, songwriter
- Instruments: Trumpet, guitar, vocals

James “Boogaloo” Bolden (born February 9, 1950) is an American musician and band leader.

== Biography ==
James “Boogaloo” Bolden was born February 9, 1950, to James and Rachel Bolden in Houston, Texas. From youth onward he had a great passion for music. He learned to play classical trumpet during his high school years and was a member of the school choir. Later, Bolden also learned to play the guitar.

Playing with famous acts such as Stevie Wonder, Issac Hayes, Temptations, Supremes, The Spinners and James Brown he gained knowledge and reputation and was eventually asked to join Duke Ellington's band. He eventually joined B.B. King's Blues Band and eventually became leader of that world famous band. A member of the King’s Blues Band for more than 30 years, it was B.B. King who gave Bolden the nickname “Boogaloo” because of Bolden’s restless feet.

Bolden's own R&B band is the James Boogaloo Bolden Blues Band. James "Boogaloo" Bolden is a Schilke Performing Artist, performing on a HC2L-S "Handcraft" Trumpet with tuning bell.

== Discography ==
Two albums have been released by the James Boogaloo Bolden Blues band.

- Playing to the King, released in 2007
- No News 'Jus' the Blues, released in 2013
