= Deuces Wild (B. B. King album) =

Studio album by B.B. King
- Released: November 4, 1997
- Genre: Blues
- Length: 76:51
- Label: MCA
- Producer: John Porter except "Dangerous Mood" by Chris Lord-Alge

B.B. King chronology
Lucille & Friends (1995)	Deuces Wild (1997)	Best of King (1997)

Professional ratings
Review scores
Source	Rating
AllMusic	2.5/5 stars
The Penguin Guide to Blues Recordings	2.5/4 stars
Uncut	3/5 stars

Deuces Wild is the thirty-fifth studio album by B.B. King released on November 4, 1997. Every song on the album features a second famous musician.

== Overview ==
The album was recorded with guest musicians from a wide range of genres, including rock, R&B, hip-hop, and country. Eric Clapton, who participated on the track "Rock Me Baby," later collaborated with B.B. King on the 2000 album Riding with the King.

This album was one of King's most commercially successful works. In the United States, it was his first entry into the Billboard 200 top 100 in 21 years since the release of Together Again... Live (1976) with Bobby Bland, and it reached number one on Billboard's Blues Albums chart. In Norway, the album marked King's first top 40 entry in 17 years. In New Zealand, it remained in the top 20 of the album chart for seven consecutive weeks, including two weeks in the top 10.

== Track listing ==
1. "If You Love Me" (with Van Morrison) – 5:48
2. "The Thrill Is Gone" (with Tracy Chapman) – 5:00
3. "Rock Me Baby" (with Eric Clapton) – 6:38
4. "Please Send Me Someone to Love" (with Mick Hucknall) – 4:16
5. "Baby I Love You" (with Bonnie Raitt) – 4:00
6. "Ain't Nobody Home" (with D'Angelo) – 5:18
7. "Pauly's Birthday Boogie" (with Jools Holland) – 3:39
8. "There Must Be a Better World Somewhere" (with Dr. John) – 4:50
9. "Confessin' the Blues" (with Marty Stuart) – 4:32
10. "Hummingbird" (with Dionne Warwick) – 4:20
11. "Bring It On Home to Me" (with Paul Carrack) – 3:10
12. "Paying the Cost to Be the Boss" (with The Rolling Stones) – 3:35
13. "Let the Good Times Roll" (with Zucchero) – 4:00
14. "Dangerous Mood" (with Joe Cocker) – 4:55
15. "Keep It Coming" (with Heavy D) – 3:57
16. "Cryin' Won't Help You Babe" (with David Gilmour & Paul Carrack) – 4:12
17. "Night Life" (with Willie Nelson) – 4:30

Tracks 7, 10, 11, 13: bonus tracks on the import edition (UK/Australia/Japan)

== Personnel ==
- B.B. King – vocals (except tracks 1, 7 and 11), guitar
- Neil Hubbard – guitar (Tr. 1, 2, 4, 7, 11, 16)
- Pino Palladino – bass guitar (Tr. 1, 3, 4, 5, 6, 7, 11, 13, 15, 16)
- Jools Holland – piano (Tr. 1, 7, 11)
- Andy Newmark – drums (Tr. 1, 4, 7, 11, 16)
- Paul Carrack – Hammond B3 organ (Tr. 1, 2, 3, 4, 7, 11), keyboards (Tr. 1, 7, 16), piano (16), vocals (11, 16)
- Van Morrison – vocals, harmonica (Tr. 1)
- Tony Braunagel – drums (Tr. 2 & 10), percussion (Tr. 2)
- Reggie McBride – bass guitar (Tr. 2 & 10)
- Johnny Lee Schell – guitar (Tr. 2 & 10)
- Lenny Castro – percussion (Tr. 2, 6, 8, 10, 11, 15)
- Tommy Eyre – Wurlitzer piano (Tr. 2), Hammond organ (Tr. 9, 14, 17), piano (10), keyboards (8, 12)
- Martin Tillman – cello (Tr. 2 & 10)
- Miles Tackett – cello (Tr. 2)
- Tracy Chapman – vocals (Tr. 2)
- Paulinho da Costa – percussion (Tr. 3)
- Eric Clapton – guitar, vocals (Tr. 3)
- Paul Waller – programming (Tr. 3)
- Simon Climie – programming (Tr. 3)
- Chris Stainton – piano (Tr. 4, 14, 16), keyboards (Tr. 4)
- Mick Hucknall – vocals (Tr. 4)
- Steve Jordan – drums (Tr. 5, 6, 13 & 15)
- Hugh McCracken – guitar (Tr. 5, 6, 13 & 15)
- Leon Pendarvis – organ (Tr 5, 6, 13 & 15)
- Jon Cleary – piano (Tr. 5, 13 & 15), Wurlitzer piano (6)
- Bonnie Raitt – guitar, vocals (Tr. 5)
- D'Angelo – keyboards, vocals (Tr. 6)
- Randy Jacobs – guitar (Tr. 8 & 17)
- Bill Payne – keyboards (Tr. 8, 9 & 17)
- Jim Keltner – drums (Tr. 8, 9 & 17)
- James "Hutch" Hutchinson – bass guitar (Tr. 8, 9, 14 & 17)
- Dr. John – vocals (Tr. 8)
- Marty Stuart – guitar, vocals (Tr. 9)
- Dionne Warwick – vocals (Tr. 10)
- Zucchero – vocals (Tr. 13)
- Joe Cocker – vocals (Tr. 14)
- Kenny Aronoff – drums (Tr. 14)
- Michael Landau – guitar (Tr. 14)
- Dean Parks – guitar (Tr. 14)
- C. J. Vanston – Hammond B3 organ (Tr. 14)
- Heavy D – rap (Tr. 15)
- David Gilmour – guitar (Tr. 16)
- Mickey Raphael – harmonica (Tr. 17)
- Willie Nelson – guitar, vocals (Tr. 17)

The Rolling Stones on track 12:

- Mick Jagger – vocals, harmonica
- Keith Richards – guitar
- Ronnie Wood – guitar
- Charlie Watts – drums
- Darryl Jones – bass guitar

String section on tracks 1 & 4:

- Andrea Byers – violin
- Armen Garabedian – violin
- Berj Garabedian – violin
- Norman Hughes – violin
- Tamara Hatwan – violin
- Kenneth Yerke – violin
- Bruce Dukov – violin
- Sid Page – violin
- Robert Becker – viola
- Larry Colbert – cello
- Dane Little – cello
- Marston Smith – cello

French horn section on track 2:

- Daniel P. Kelley – French horn
- Yvonne S. Moriarty – French horn
- Kurt Snyder – French horn

Horn section on tracks 2, 7, 10, 11, 12 & 13:

- Darrell Leonard – trumpet, horn arrangements
- Joe Sublett – tenor saxophone
- Greg Smith – baritone saxophone (tracks 7 & 13 only)

Horn section on tracks 6 & 8:

- Jamil Sharif – trumpet
- Brian Murray – trumpet
- Carl Blouin – baritone saxophone
- Joe Saulsbury Jr. – tenor saxophone

Backing vocals on tracks 5, 10, 11 & 16:

- Harry Bowens – background vocals
- Terence Forsythe – background vocals
- Vincent Bonham – background vocals

== Charts ==
Chart (1997–1999)	Peak position
Australian Albums (ARIA)	67
Dutch Albums (Album Top 100)	32
Finnish Albums (Suomen virallinen lista)	39
German Albums (Offizielle Top 100)	37
New Zealand Albums (RMNZ)	9
Norwegian Albums (VG-lista)	40
Scottish Albums (Official Charts)	100
Swiss Albums (Schweizer Hitparade)	33
UK Albums (Official Charts)	86
US Billboard 200	73
US Top Blues Albums (Billboard)	1

== Certifications ==
Region	Certification	Certified units/sales
Canada (Music Canada)	Platinum	100,000^{^}
New Zealand (RMNZ)	Gold	7,500^{^}
Spain (Promusicae)	Gold	50,000^{^}
United States (RIAA)	Gold	500,000^{^}
^{^} Shipments figures based on certification alone.
