= Blues Hall of Fame =

Award by Blues Foundation, since 2015 also a music museum in Memphis, Tennessee

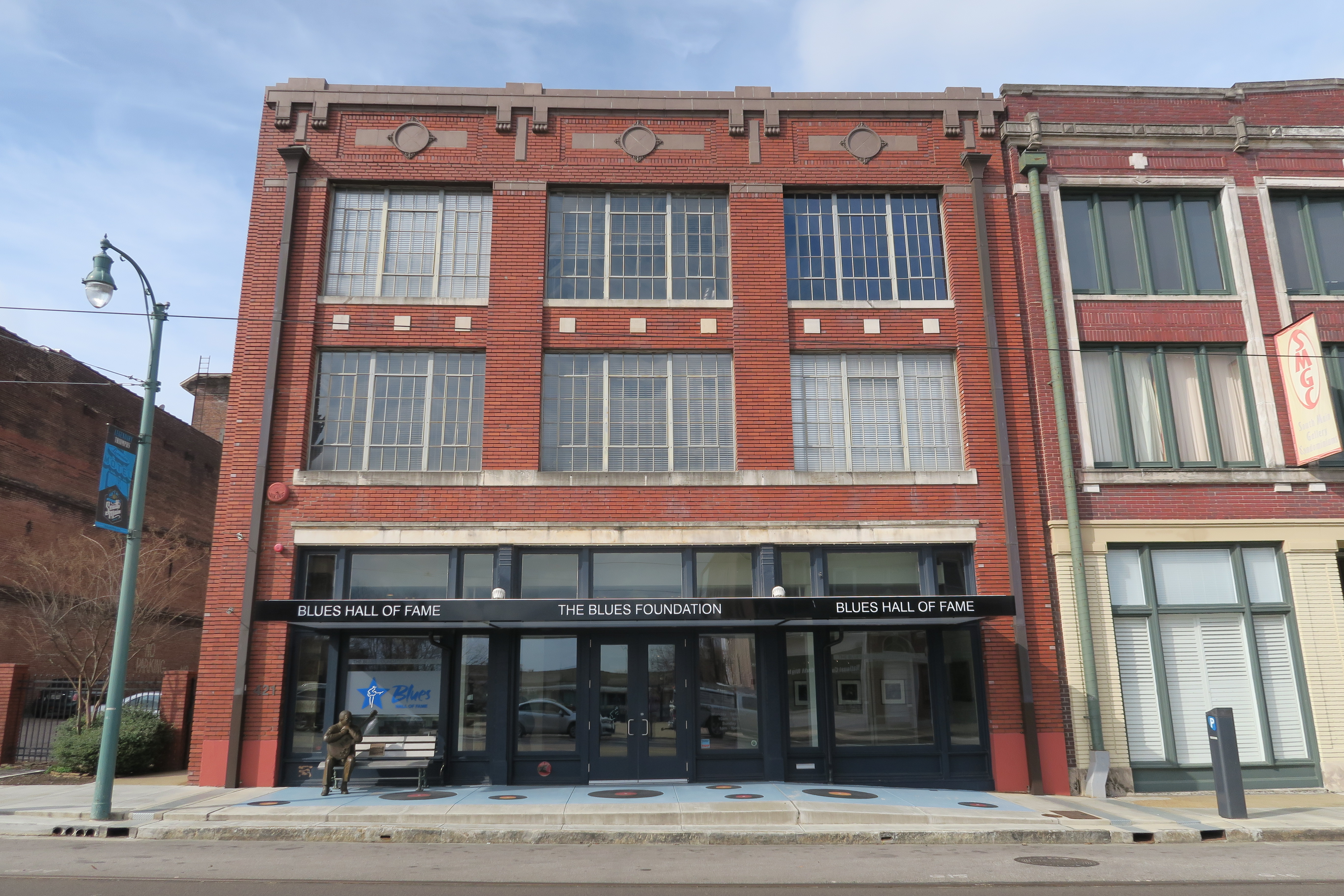
- Museum front entrance
- Established: 1980 (Award); 2015 (Museum)
- Location: 421 South Main Street; Memphis, Tennessee 38103
- Coordinates: 35.1351743°N 90.061539°W
- Type: Hall of fame, music museum,
- President & CEO: Kimberly Horton
- Director: Ashley Linsey
- Chairperson: Dr. Janice Johnston
- Owner: The Blues Foundation

The Blues Hall of Fame is a music museum operated by the Blues Foundation at 421 S. Main Street in Memphis, Tennessee. Initially, the "Blues Hall of Fame" was not a physical building, but a listing of people who have significantly contributed to blues music. Started in 1980, it honors people who have performed, recorded, or documented blues. The museum opened to the public on May 8, 2015.

== Inductees ==
=== Performers ===
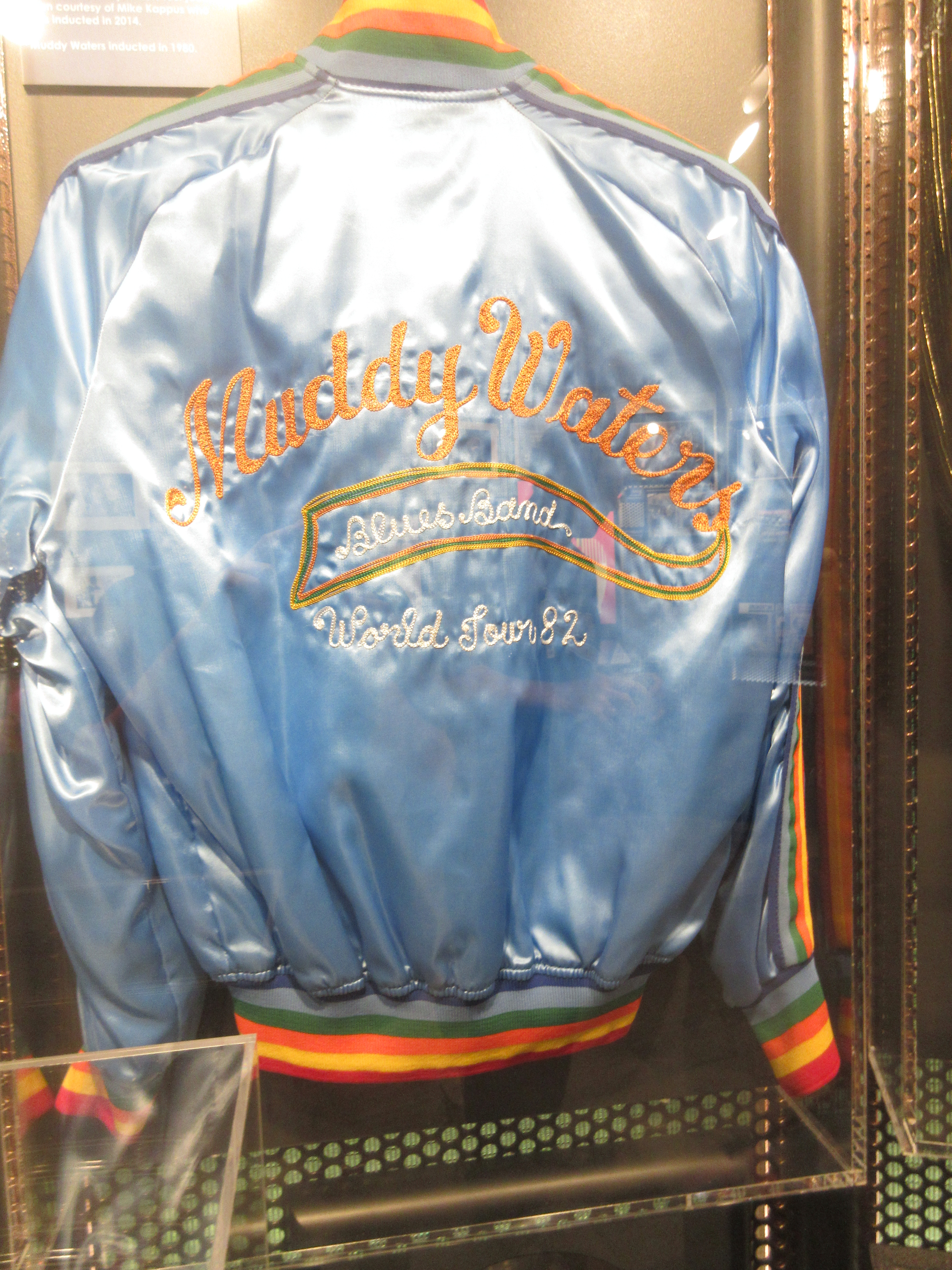
A 1982 tour jacket of Muddy Waters', a member of the inaugural class of inductees

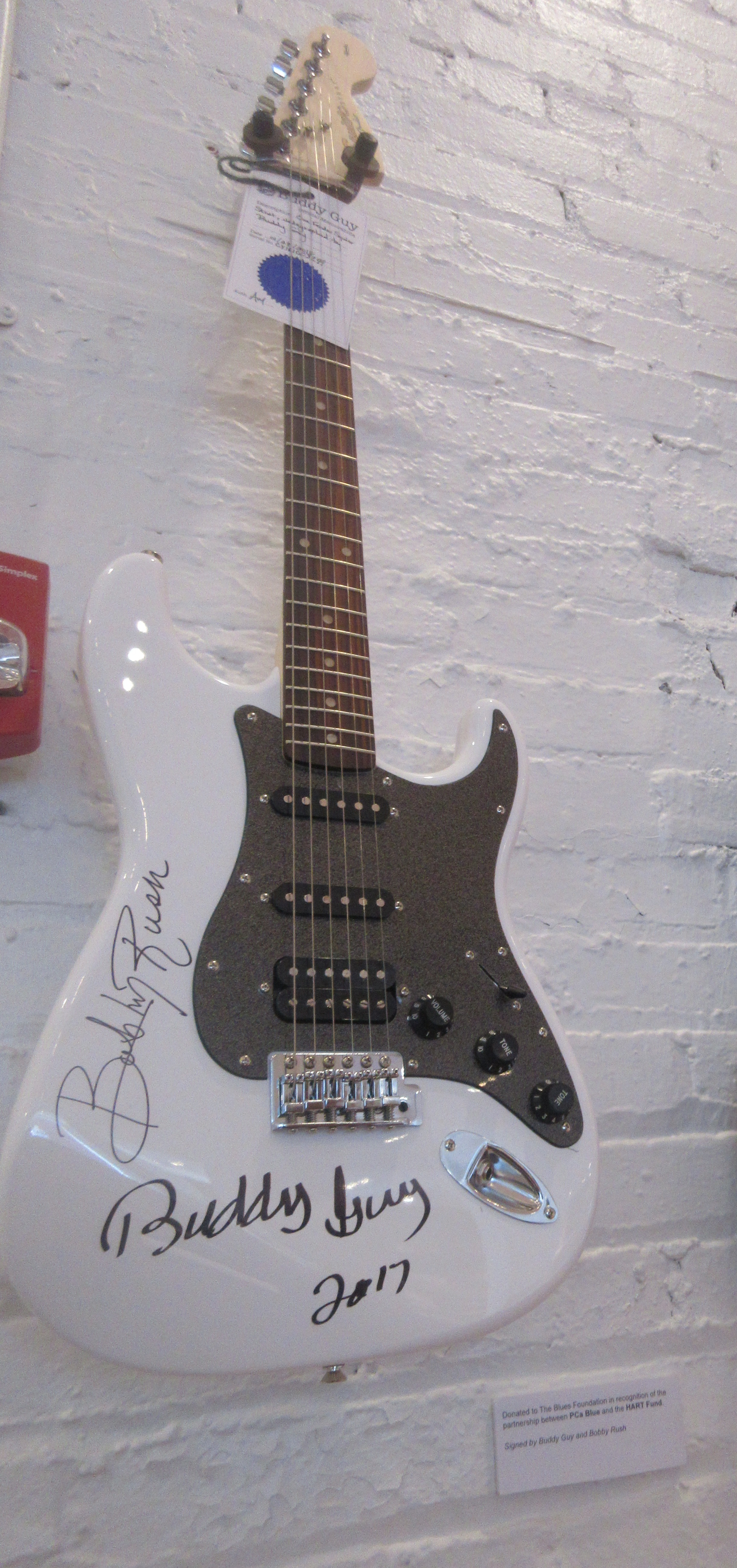
Autographed guitar of 1985 inductee Buddy Guy

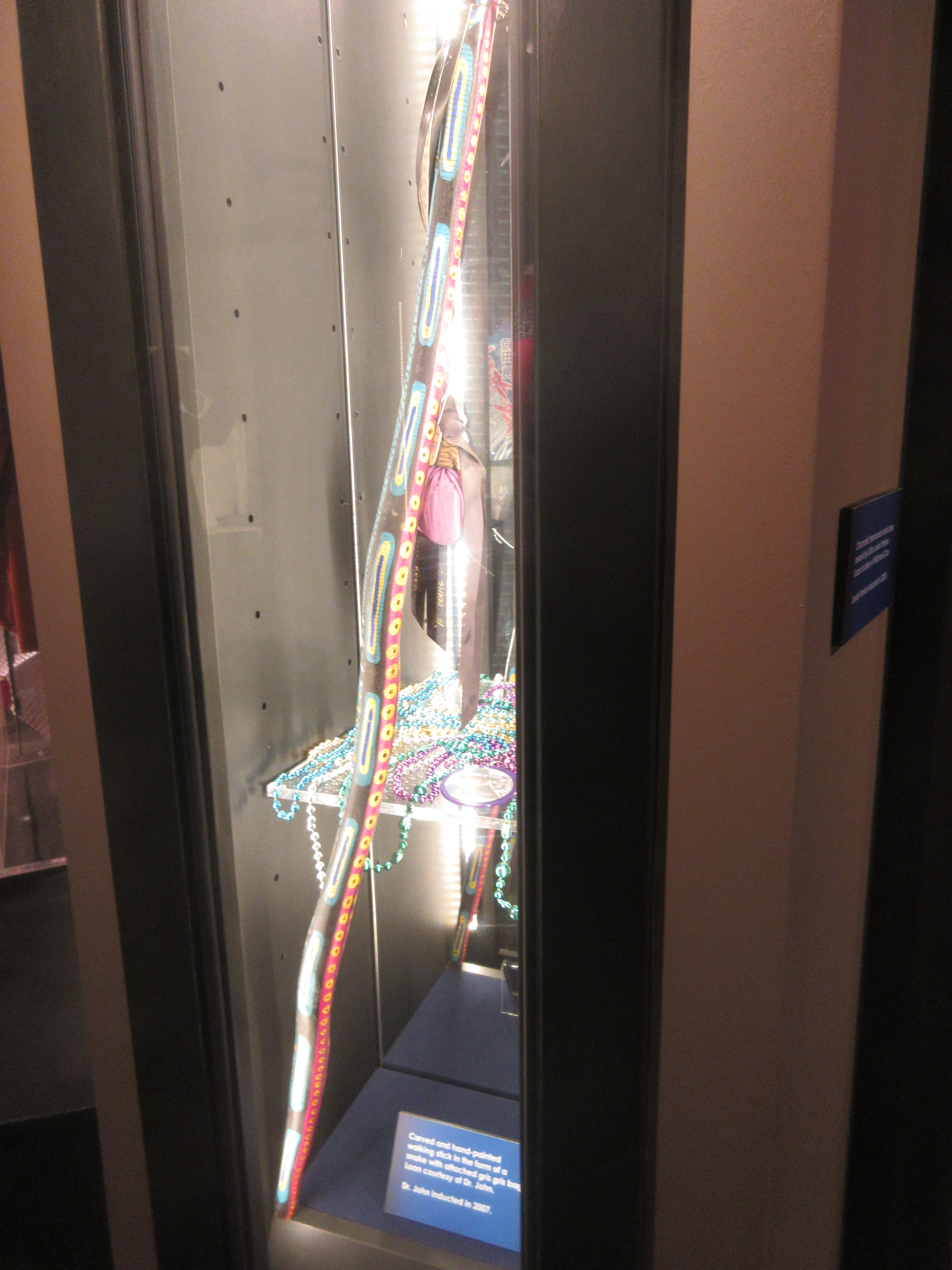
Elaborate, Mardi Gras-themed walking stick of 2007 inductee Dr. John

List of performers inducted
Year	Name
1980	Big Bill Broonzy
1980	Willie Dixon
1980	John Lee Hooker
1980	Lightnin' Hopkins
1980	Son House
1980	Howlin' Wolf
1980	Elmore James
1980	Blind Lemon Jefferson
1980	Robert Johnson
1980	B.B. King
1980	Little Walter
1980	Memphis Minnie
1980	Muddy Waters
1980	Charley Patton
1980	Jimmy Reed
1980	Bessie Smith
1980	Otis Spann
1980	T-Bone Walker
1980	Sonny Boy Williamson I
1980	Sonny Boy Williamson II
1981	Bobby "Blue" Bland
1981	Roy Brown
1981	Blind Willie McTell
1981	Professor Longhair
1981	Tampa Red
1982	Leroy Carr
1982	Ray Charles
1982	Big Walter Horton
1982	Freddie King
1982	Magic Sam
1983	Louis Jordan
1983	Albert King
1983	Robert Nighthawk
1983	Ma Rainey
1983	Big Joe Turner
1984	Otis Rush
1984	Hound Dog Taylor
1984	Big Mama Thornton
1985	Chuck Berry
1985	Buddy Guy
1985	J. B. Hutto
1985	Slim Harpo
1986	Albert Collins
1986	Tommy Johnson
1986	Lead Belly
1987	Percy Mayfield
1987	Eddie Taylor
1987	Sonny Terry
1988	Mississippi John Hurt
1988	Little Milton
1988	Jay McShann
1988	Johnny Winter
1989	Clifton Chenier
1989	Robert Lockwood Jr.
1989	Memphis Slim
1990	Blind Blake
1990	Lonnie Johnson
1990	Bukka White
1991	Sleepy John Estes
1991	Billie Holiday
1991	Mississippi Fred McDowell
1991	Sunnyland Slim
1992	Skip James
1992	Johnny Shines
1992	Big Joe Williams
1993	Champion Jack Dupree
1993	Lowell Fulson
1994	Arthur "Big Boy" Crudup
1994	Wynonie Harris
1995	Jimmy Rogers
1996	Charles Brown
1996	David "Honeyboy" Edwards
1997	Brownie McGhee
1997	Koko Taylor
1998	Luther Allison
1998	Junior Wells
1999	Clarence "Gatemouth" Brown
1999	Roosevelt Sykes
2000	Johnny Otis
2000	Stevie Ray Vaughan
2001	Etta James
2001	Little Junior Parker
2001	Rufus Thomas
2002	Ruth Brown
2002	Big Maceo Merriweather
2003	Fats Domino
2003	Pinetop Perkins
2003	Sippie Wallace
2003	Dinah Washington
2004	Bo Diddley
2004	Blind Boy Fuller
2005	Walter Davis
2005	Ike Turner
2006	Paul Butterfield
2006	James Cotton
2006	Roy Milton
2006	Bobby Rush
2007	Dave Bartholomew
2007	Dr. John
2007	Eddie "Guitar Slim" Jones
2007	Sister Rosetta Tharpe
2008	Jimmy McCracklin
2008	Mississippi Sheiks
2008	Hubert Sumlin
2008	Johnny "Guitar" Watson
2008	Peetie Wheatstraw
2008	Jimmy Witherspoon
2009	Reverend Gary Davis
2009	Son Seals
2009	Taj Mahal
2009	Irma Thomas
2010	Lonnie Brooks
2010	Gus Cannon
2010	W. C. Handy
2010	Amos Milburn
2010	Charlie Musselwhite
2010	Bonnie Raitt
2011	Big Maybelle
2011	Robert Cray
2011	John P. Hammond
2011	Alberta Hunter
2011	Denise LaSalle
2011	J. B. Lenoir
2012	Billy Boy Arnold
2012	Mike Bloomfield
2012	Buddy and Ella Johnson
2012	Lazy Lester
2012	Furry Lewis
2012	Matt "Guitar" Murphy
2012	Frank Stokes
2012	Allen Toussaint
2013	Otis Clay
2013	Earl Hooker
2013	Little Brother Montgomery
2013	Jimmie Rodgers
2013	Jody Williams
2013	Joe Louis Walker
2014	Big Jay McNeely
2014	Eddie Shaw
2014	Eddie "Cleanhead" Vinson
2014	R. L. Burnside
2014	Robert Pete Williams
2015	Eric Clapton
2015	Little Richard
2015	Tommy Brown
2016	Elvin Bishop
2016	Eddy Clearwater
2016	Jimmy Johnson
2016	John Mayall
2016	The Memphis Jug Band
2017	Johnny Copeland
2017	Henry Gray
2017	Willie Johnson
2017	Latimore
2017	Magic Slim
2017	Mavis Staples
2018	The Aces
2018	Georgia Tom Dorsey
2018	Sam Lay
2018	Mamie Smith
2018	Roebuck "Pops" Staples
2019	Count Basie
2019	Booker T. & the M.G.'s
2019	Ida Cox
2019	Pee Wee Crayton
2019	Aretha Franklin
2020–2021	Eddie Boyd
2020–2021	Victoria Spivey
2020–2021	Billy Branch
2020–2021	Bettye LaVette
2020–2021	Syl Johnson
2020–2021	George "Harmonica" Smith
2022	Lucille Bogan
2022	Little Willie John
2022	Johnnie Taylor
2023	Carey Bell
2023	Junior Kimbrough
2023	Esther Phillips
2023	John Primer
2023	Snooky Pryor
2023	Fenton Robinson
2023	Josh White
2024	Sugar Pie DeSanto
2024	Lurrie Bell
2024	Odetta
2024	Jimmy Rushing
2024	Scrapper Blackwell
2024	O. V. Wright
2024	Lil' Ed and the Blues Imperials
2025	Bob Stroger
2025	William Bell
2025	Blind Willie Johnson
2025	Henry Townshend
2025	Jessie Mae Hemphill
2026	Kenny Neal
2026	Bob Margolin
2026	Henry "Ragtime Texas" Thomas
2026	Rosco Gordon
2026	Barbara Lynn
2026	Marcia Ball

=== Nonperformers ===
List of nonperformers inducted
Year	Name
1991	Leonard Chess
1994	Bill "Hoss" Allen
1994	John Lomax
1994	Alan Lomax
1994	John Richbourg
1994	Gene Nobles
1995	Phil Chess
1996	Bob Koester
1996	Pete Welding
1997	Bruce Iglauer
1998	Lillian McMurry
1998	Sam Phillips
1999	Lester Melrose
1999	Chris Strachwitz
2000	Dick Waterman
2001	Theresa Needham
2001	Robert Palmer
2002	Jim O'Neal
2003	Ralph Bass
2004	J. Mayo Williams
2005	H. C. Speir
2006	Bihari brothers
2006	Bobby Robinson
2006	Jerry Wexler
2007	Ahmet Ertegun
2007	Art Rupe
2008	John Hammond
2008	Paul Oliver
2009	Clifford Antone
2009	Mike Leadbitter
2009	Bob Porter
2010	Peter Guralnick
2010	"Sunshine" Sonny Payne
2011	Bruce Bromberg
2011	Vivian Carter & James Bracken
2011	Samuel Charters
2011	John Wesley Work III
2012	Horst Lippmann & Fritz Rau
2012	Doc Pomus
2012	Pervis Spann
2013	Cosimo Matassa
2013	Dave Clark
2013	Henry Glover
2014	Mike Kappus
2014	Don Robey
2014	Dick Shurman
2016	Tommy Couch Sr. and Wolf Stephenson
2017	Amy van Singel
2018	Al Benson
2019	Moe Asch
2020	Ralph Peer
2022	Mary Katherine Aldin
2022	Otis Blackwell
2023	David Evans
2024	William R. Ferris
2025	Bob Geddins
2026	Syd Nathan

=== Literature ===
List of books/magazines inducted
Year	Book/magazine	Author(s)	Years published
1982	Living Blues		1970–present
1982	Blues and Gospel Records 1902–1942	Robert M.W. Dixon and John Godrich	1964–1997
1982	Blues Unlimited		1963–1987
1983	Blues Who’s Who: A Biographical Dictionary of Blues Singers	Sheldon Harris	1979
1985	Blues Records 1943–1966	Mike Leadbitter and Neil Slaven	1968
1986	Chicago Breakdown (Chicago Blues)	Mike Rowe	1973–1981
1987	The Story of the Blues	Paul Oliver	1969
1988	Blues Fell This Morning: Meaning in the Blues	Paul Oliver	1960
1989	Feel Like Going Home	Peter Guralnick	1971
1990	Big Bill Blues: William Broonzy’s Story as told to Yannick Bruynoghe	Big Bill Broonzy	1955
1991	The Country Blues	Samuel Charters	1959
1991	Big Road Blues	David Evans	1982
1992	I Am the Blues: The Willie Dixon Story	Willie Dixon, Don Snowden	1989
1993	Urban Blues	Charles Keil	1966
1994	Nothing But the Blues: The Music and the Musicians	Lawrence Cohn	1993
1995	Sweet Soul Music: Rhythm and Blues and the Southern Dream of Freedom	Peter Guralnick	1986
1995	Searching for Robert Johnson: The Life and Legend of the ‘King of the Delta Blues'	Peter Guralnick	1989
1996	The Land Where the Blues Began	Alan Lomax	1993
1997	Honkers and Shouters: The Golden Years of Rhythm & Blues	Arnold Shaw (author)	1978
1998	Blues from the Delta	William Ferris	1970
1999	The World Don't Owe Me Nothing	David "Honeyboy" Edwards	1997
2000	The Country Blues	Samuel Charters	1959
2001	Stormy Monday: The T-Bone Walker Story	Helen Oakley Dance	1987
2002	Spinning Blues Into Gold: The Chess Brothers and the Legendary Chess Records	Nadine Cohodas	2000
2003	Can't Be Satisfied: The Life and Times of Muddy Waters	Robert Gordon	2002
2004	Juke Blues magazine		1985–present
2005	Blues People: Negro Music in White America	Amiri Baraka	1963
2006	Blues & Rhythm magazine		1984–present
2006	Chasin' That Devil's Music	Gayle Dean Wardlow	1998
2007	Blues with a Feeling: The Little Walter Story	Tony Glover, Scott Dirks & Ward Gaines	2002
2008	Moanin' at Midnight: The Life and Times of Howlin' Wolf	James Segrest & Mark Hoffman	2004
2011	Walking to New Orleans: The Story of New Orleans Rhythm & Blues	John Broven	1978
2012	The Voice of the Blues	Jim O'Neal	2002
2013	Soulsville, U.S.A.: The Story of Stax Records	Rob Bowman	2003
2014	Dream Boogie: The Triumph of Sam Cooke	Peter Guralnick	2005
2016	Early Downhome Blues: A Musical and Cultural Analysis	Jeff Todd Titon	1977
2017	Father of the Blues	W.C. Handy	1941
2018	I Feel So Good: The Life and Times of Big Bill Broonzy	Bob Reisman	2011
2019	Lost Delta Found: Rediscovering the Fisk University – Library of Congress Coahoma County Study, 1941–1942	John Wesley Work III	2005
2020	Earl Hooker, Blues Master	Sebastian Danchin	2001
2022	Red River Blues: The Blues Tradition in the Southeast	Bruce Bastin	1986
2023	The Original Blues: The Emergence of the Blues in African American Vaudeville 1899-1926	Lynn Abbott & Doug Seroff	2017
2024	Blues Legacies and Black Feminism: Gertrude "Ma" Rainey, Bessie Smith, and Billie Holiday	Angela Davis	1998
2025	Woman With Guitar: Memphis Minnie's Blues	Beth and Paul Garon	1998
2026	Ragged but Right: Black Traveling Shows, “Coon Songs”, and the Dark Parkway to Blues and Jazz	Lynn Abbott & Doug Seroff	2007

=== Albums ===
List of albums inducted
Year	Artist	Title	Record label	Release year	Album type	Notes
1982	Robert Johnson	King of the Delta Blues Singers	Columbia Records	1961	Compilation	
1983	B.B. King	Live at the Regal	ABC-Paramount Records	1965	Live	
1983	Muddy Waters	McKinley Morganfield A.K.A. Muddy Waters	Chess Records	1971	Compilation	
1983	Muddy Waters	The Best of Muddy Waters	Chess Records	1958	Greatest Hits	
1983	Charley Patton	Founder of the Delta Blues	Yazoo Records	1970	Compilation	
1983	Robert Johnson	King of the Delta Blues Singers, Vol. II	Columbia Records	1970	Compilation	
1984	Magic Sam	West Side Soul	Delmark Records	1968	Studio	
1984	Little Walter	Boss Blues Harmonica	Chess Records	1972	Compilation	
1984	Junior Wells	Hoodoo Man Blues	Delmark Records	1965	Studio	
1985	Howlin Wolf	Chester Burnett A.K.A. Howlin' Wolf	Chess Records	1972	Compilation	
1985	Howlin Wolf	Howlin Wolf	Chess Records	1962	Compilation	
1985	Albert King	Born Under a Bad Sign	Stax Records	1967	Compilation	
1986	Albert Collins	Ice Pickin	Alligator Records	1978	Studio	
1986	Willie Dixon	I Am the Blues	Columbia Records	1970	Studio	
1986	Albert King	Live Wire/Blues Power	Stax Records	1968	Live	
1987	Freddie King	Hide Away	King Records	1969	Compilation	
1987	Bobby "Blue" Bland	Two Steps from the Blues	Duke Records	1961	Compilation	
1987	Leroy Carr	Blues Before Sunrise	Columbia Records	1962	Compilation	
1988	Muddy Waters	Down on Stovall’s Plantation	Testament Records	1966	Compilation	
1988	Muddy Waters	The Chess Box	P-Vine Records	1985	Greatest Hits	
1988	Elmore James	The Original Flair & Meteor Sides	Ace Records	1984	Greatest Hits	
1989	Otis Rush	Right Place, Wrong Time	Bullfrog Records	1976	Studio	
1989	Bessie Smith	The World’s Greatest Blues Singer	Columbia Records	1970	Compilation	
1989	Albert Collins, Robert Cray & Johnny Copeland	Showdown!	Alligator Records	1985	Studio	
1989	Robert Nighthawk	Live on Maxwell Street 1964	Rounder Records	1980	Live	
1990	Skip James	The Complete 1931 Session	Yazoo Records	1986	Compilation	
1990	Willie Dixon	The Chess Box	MCA Chess Records	1989	Greatest Hits	
1990	Magic Sam Blues Band	Black Magic	Delmark Records	1969	Studio	
1991	Muddy Waters	Can't Get No Grindin'	Chess Records	1973	Studio	The only Muddy Waters album in the Hall of Fame that was recorded as an album
1991	Various Artists	Chicago/The Blues/Today!	Vanguard Records	1966	Compilation	
1991	Little Walter	The Best of Little Walter	Checker Records	1958	Greatest Hits	
1992	Bukka White	Parchman Farm	Columbia Records	1970	Compilation	
1992	Robert Johnson	The Complete Recordings	Columbia/Legacy Records	1990	Greatest Hits	
1992	Champion Jack Dupree	Blues from the Gutter	Atlantic Records	1958	Studio	
1992	Son House	Father of the Folk Blues	Columbia Records	1965	Compilation	
1993	Jimmy Rogers	Chicago Bound	Chess Records	1970	Compilation	
1994	T-Bone Walker	The Complete Recordings of T-Bone Walker 1940–1954	Mosaic Records	1990	Greatest Hits	
1995	Otis Spann	Otis Spann Is the Blues	Candid Records	1961	Studio	
1995	Big Joe Turner	The Boss of the Blues	Atlantic Records	1956	Studio	The oldest album on the list
1996	Hound Dog Taylor & the Houserockers	Hound Dog Taylor & the Houserockers	Alligator Records	1971	Studio	
1997	Paul Butterfield Blues Band	Paul Butterfield Blues Band	Elektra Records	1965	Studio	
1998	Albert King	I’ll Play the Blues for You	Stax Records	1972	Studio	
1999	Junior Wells	Blues Hit Big Town	Delmark Records	1977	Compilation	
2000	Mississippi Fred McDowell	Mississippi Delta Blues	Arhoolie Records	1964	Compilation	
2001	Muddy Waters	The Complete Plantation Recordings	MCA Chess Records	1993	Compilation	
2002	B.B. King	Live in Cook County Jail	ABC Records	1971	Live	
2003	Junior Wells	It's My Life Baby!	Vanguard Records	1966	Studio	
2005	Z. Z. Hill	Down Home	Malaco Records	1982	Studio	
2006	Charley Patton	Screamin' and Hollerin' the Blues: The Worlds of Charley Patton	Revenant Records	2001	Greatest Hits	The latest album on the list
2006	Mississippi Fred McDowell	I Do Not Play No Rock 'n' Roll	Capitol Records	1970	Studio	McDowell's first album that featured electric guitar
2006	Etta James	Tell Mama	Cadet Records	1968	Studio	
2007	Junior Parker	Driving Wheel	Duke Records	1962	Studio	
2007	Sonny Boy Williamson II	Down and Out Blues	Checker Records	1960	Compilation	
2007	Robert Pete Williams & others	Angola Prisoners' Blues	Louisiana Folklore Society Arhoolie Records	1959	Studio	
2008	Bobby Bland	Members Only	Malaco Records	1985	Studio	
2008	Big Joe Williams	Piney Woods Blues	Delmark Records	1958	Compilation	
2008	Etta James	Etta James Rocks the House	Argo Records	1964	Live	
2008	Jimmy Reed	I'm Jimmy Reed	Vee-Jay Records	1958	Studio	
2008	Freddie King	Freddy King Sings	King Records	1961	Studio	
2009	Various Artists	Blues with a Feeling	Vanguard Records	1993	Live	Recorded at the Newport Folk Festival in 1963, 1964, 1965, and 1968
2009	Alberta Hunter	Amtrak Blues	Columbia Records	1978	Studio	
2009	T-Bone Walker	T-Bone Blues	Atlantic Records	1959	Studio	
2010	Robert Cray	Strong Persuader	Mercury Records	1986	Studio	
2010	Fenton Robinson	I Hear Some Blues Downstairs	Alligator Records	1977	Studio	
2010	Lowell Fulson	Hung Down Head	Chess Records	1970	Compilation	
2011	Sam Cooke	Night Beat	RCA Victor	1963	Studio	
2011	Robert Cray	False Accusations	HighTone Records	1985	Studio	
2011	Howlin' Wolf	The Real Folk Blues	Chess Records	1965	Compilation	
2012	Buddy Guy	Damn Right, I've Got the Blues	Silvertone Records	1991	Studio	
2012	The Robert Cray Band	Bad Influence	HighTone Records	1983	Studio	
2013	Howlin' Wolf	More Real Folk Blues	Chess Records	1967	Compilation	
2013	Louis Jordan	Louis Jordan’s Greatest Hits	Decca Records	1969	Greatest Hits	
2013	Henry Thomas	Complete Recorded Works/Texas Worried Blues	Herwin Records Yazoo Records	1975/1989	Greatest Hits	
2014	Howlin' Wolf	Moanin’ in the Moonlight	Chess Records	1959	Compilation	
2014	J.B. Hutto	Hawk Squat	Delmark Records	1969	Studio	
2016	Alan Lomax	Blues in the Mississippi Night	Nixa Records United Artists Records	1957/1959	Studio	
2017	John Lee Hooker	Real Folk Blues	Chess Records	1966	Studio	
2018	B.B. King	Blues Is King	BluesWay Records	1967	Live	
2019	Elmore James	The Sky Is Crying	Sphere Sound Records	1965		
2020	Howlin' Wolf	The Chess Box	Chess Records	1991	Compilation	
2022	Bo Diddley	Bo Diddley	Chess Records	1958	Studio	
2023	Little Walter	The Complete Chess Masters (1950-1967)	Hip-O Select	2009	Compilation	
2024	Bobby Bland	Here's the Man!	Duke Records	1962	Studio	
2025	Lightnin' Hopkins	Gold Star Sessions	Arhoolie Records	1990-91	Compilation	
2026	Howlin' Wolf	Howlin' Wolf–The Chess Box	Chess Records	1991	Compilation	

=== Singles/album tracks ===
List of singles/album tracks inducted
Year	Artist	Title	Record label	Release year	Notes
1983	Big Maceo	"Worried Life Blues"	Bluebird Records	1941	
1983	Elmore James	"Dust My Broom"	Trumpet Records	1951	
1983	Robert Johnson	"Sweet Home Chicago"	Vocalion	1936	
1983	Robert Johnson	"Hellhound on My Trail"	Vocalion	1937	
1983	T-Bone Walker	"Call It Stormy Monday (But Tuesday Is Just as Bad)"	Black & White Records	1947	
1984	Muddy Waters	"Got My Mojo Working"	Chess Records	1960	From At Newport 1960
1984	Muddy Waters	"Hoochie Coochie Man"	Chess Records	1954	
1984	Guitar Slim	"The Things That I Used to Do"	Specialty Records	1953	
1985	John Lee Hooker	"Boogie Chillen'"	Modern Records	1948	
1985	B.B. King	"The Thrill Is Gone"	ABC Bluesway Records	1969	Peaked at No. 15 on the Billboard Hot 100
1985	Howlin Wolf	"Smoke Stack Lightning"	Chess Records	1956	
1986	Robert Johnson	"Cross Road Blues"	Vocalion	1936	
1986	Little Walter	"Juke"	Checker Records	1952	Harmonica instrumental
1986	Muddy Waters	"Manish Boy"	Chess Records	1955	
1987	Tommy Johnson	"Big Road Blues"	Victor Records	1928	
1987	Sonny Boy Williamson II	"Help Me"	Checker Records	1963	
1987	Percy Mayfield	"Please Send Me Someone to Love"	Specialty Records	1950	
1988	Leroy Carr	"How Long, How Long Blues"	Vocalion Records	1928	
1988	Charley Patton	"Pony Blues"	Paramount Records	1929	
1988	Albert King	"Born Under a Bad Sign"	Stax Records	1967	
1989	Robert Johnson	"Come On in My Kitchen"	Vocalion	1936	
1989	Muddy Waters	"Long Distance Call"	Chess Records	1951	
1989	Johnny Moore’s Three Blazers	"Driftin' Blues"	Philo Records	1945	
1990	Robert Johnson	"Terraplane Blues"	Vocalion	1936	
1990	Sonny Boy Williamson I	"Good Morning, School Girl"	Bluebird Records	1937	
1990	Jimmy Reed	"Big Boss Man"	Vee-Jay Records	1960	
1991	Jackie Brenston and His Delta Cats	Rocket 88	Chess Records	1951	
1991	Sonny Boy Williamson II	"Nine Below Zero"	Trumpet Records	1951	
1991	Elmore James	"The Sky Is Crying"	Fire Records	1959	
1991	Howlin Wolf	"Killing Floor"	Chess Records	1964	
1992	Blind Willie McTell	"Statesboro Blues"	Victor Records	1928	Popularized by the Allman Brothers Band in 1971
1992	Big Joe Williams	"Baby, Please Don't Go"	Bluebird Records	1935	
1993	Lowell Fulson	"Reconsider Baby"	Checker Records	1954	
1994	Larry Davis	"Texas Flood"	Duke Records	1958	Popularized by Stevie Ray Vaughan in 1983
1994	Otis Rush	"I Can't Quit You Baby"	Cobra Records	1956	
1995	Koko Taylor	"Wang Dang Doodle"	Checker Records	1965	First recorded by Howlin' Wolf in 1960
1996	Sonny Boy Williamson II	"Don't Start Me Talkin'"	Checker Records	1955	
1997	Slim Harpo	"Baby Scratch My Back"	Excello Records	1965	
1998	Junior Wells	"Messin' with the Kid"	Chief Records	1960	
1999	Blind Willie Johnson	"Dark Was the Night, Cold Was the Ground"	Columbia Records	1927	Solo slide guitar instrumental
2000	Z.Z. Hill	"Down Home Blues"	Malaco Records	1982	The latest song on the list
2001	Big Joe Turner	"Shake, Rattle and Roll"	Atlantic Records	1954	
2002	St. Louis Jimmy Oden	"Goin' Down Slow"	Bluebird Records	1941	
2003	Little Johnny Taylor	"Part Time Love"	Galaxy Records	1964	
2004	Jimmy Reed	"Baby What You Want Me to Do"	Vee-Jay Records	1959	
2004	Slim Harpo	"Rainin in my Heart"	Excello Records	1961	
2005	Charles Brown	"Black Night"	Aladdin Records	1951	
2006	Bill Doggett	"Honky Tonk, Parts 1 & 2"	King Records (United States)	1956	Instrumental
2006	Skip James	"Devil Got My Woman"	Paramount Records	1931	
2006	Big Mama Thornton	"Hound Dog"	Peacock Records	1952	Popularized by Elvis Presley in 1956
2007	Son House	"Death Letter"	Columbia Records	1965	
2007	Freddie King	"Hide Away"	Federal Records	1961	Electric guitar instrumental
2007	Robert Nighthawk	"Black Angel Blues"	Aristocrat Records	1949	First recorded by Lucille Bogan in 1930
2008	Otis Rush	"Double Trouble"	Cobra Records	1958	Stevie Ray Vaughan's band name was inspired by the song.
2008	Little Walter	"My Babe"	Checker Records	1955	
2008	Bessie Smith	"Backwater Blues"	Columbia Records	1927	
2009	Louis Jordan	"Caldonia"	Decca Records	1945	
2009	Mississippi Sheiks	"Sitting on Top of the World"	Okeh Records	1930	
2009	John Lee Hooker	"Boom Boom"	Vee-Jay Records	1961	
2010	Howlin' Wolf	"Spoonful"	Chess Records	1960	
2010	Little Willie John	"Fever"	King Records	1956	
2010	Otis Rush	"All Your Love (I Miss Loving)"	Cobra Records	1958	
2010	Blind Lemon Jefferson	"Match Box Blues"	Paramount Records	1927	
2010	Big Bill Broonzy	"Key to the Highway"	Okeh Records	1941	
2011	Eddie Boyd	"Five Long Years"	J.O.B. Records	1952	
2011	Skip James	"Hard Time Killin' Floor Blues"	Paramount Records	1931	
2011	Robert Johnson	"Love in Vain"	Vocalion Records	1937	
2011	Jimmy Witherspoon	"Ain't Nobody's Business"	Supreme	1947	First recorded by Anna Meyers in 1922
2012	Tampa Red	"It Hurts Me Too"	Bluebird Records	1940	
2012	Magic Sam	"All Your Love"	Cobra Records	1957	
2012	Pine Top Smith	"Pine Top's Boogie Woogie"	Vocalion Records	1928	
2013	Howlin' Wolf	"How Many More Years"	Chess Records	1951	
2013	Louis Jordan	"Let the Good Times Roll"	Decca Records	1946	
2013	Tommy Johnson	"Canned Heat Blues"	Victor Records	1928	Blues rock group Canned Heat took their name from the song
2013	Memphis Minnie	"Me and My Chauffeur Blues"	Okeh Records	1941	
2014	Tampa Red & Georgia Tom	"It's Tight Like That"	Vocalion	1928	
2014	Kokomo Arnold	"Milk Cow Blues"	Decca Records	1934	
2014	Charley Patton	"High Water Everywhere, Parts I & II"	Paramount Records	1930	
2014	Erskine Hawkins and His Orchestra	"After Hours"	Bluebird Records	1940	
2014	Robert Petway	"Catfish Blues"	Bluebird Records	1941	
2016	Mamie Smith	"Crazy Blues"	Okeh Records	1920	The oldest song on the list
2016	Jimmy Rogers	"That's All Right"	Chess Records	1950	
2016	Billy Boy Arnold	"I Wish You Would"	Vee-Jay Records	1955	
2016	Johnny Moore's Three Blazers	"Merry Christmas Baby"	Exclusive Records	1947	The first Christmas song in the Hall of Fame
2016	Leroy Carr and Scrapper Blackwell	"Blues Before Sunrise"	Vocalion	1934	
2017	Bo Diddley	"Bo Diddley"	Checker Records	1955	First Bo Diddley song to use the Bo Diddley beat
2017	Tommy Tucker	"Hi-Heel Sneakers"	Chess Records	1963	
2017	Howlin' Wolf	"I Ain't Superstitious"	Chess Records	1961	
2017	Albert King	"I'll Play the Blues For You"	Stax Records	1971	
2017	Son House	"Preachin' the Blues"	Paramount Records	1930	
2018	Albert King	"Cross Cut Saw"	Stax Records	1966	First recorded by Tommy McClennan in 1941
2018	Booker T. & the M.G.'s	"Green Onions"	Stax Records	1962	Instrumental
2018	Bo Diddley	"I'm a Man"	Checker Records	1955	
2018	Big Joe Turner	"Roll 'Em Pete"	Vocalion	1938	
2018	Ma Rainey	"See See Rider Blues"	Paramount Records	1924	
2019	Ray Charles	"I Got a Woman"	Atlantic Records	1954	
2019	B.B. King	"Every Day I Have the Blues"	RPM	1954	
2019	Muddy Waters	"Rollin' Stone"	Chess Records	1950	
2019	Elmore James	"Shake Your Moneymaker"	Fire Records	1961	
2019	Bessie Smith	"The St. Louis Blues"	Columbia Records	1925	One of the first blues songs to succeed as a pop song
2020	Arthur Crudup	"That's All Right"	RCA Victor	1946	
2020	Ruth Brown	"(Mama) He Treats Your Daughter Mean"	Atlantic Records	1952	
2020	Bertha Hill	"Trouble in Mind"	Okeh Records	1926	
2020	Willie Brown	"Future Blues"	Paramount Records	1930	
2020	B.B. King	"3 O'Clock Blues"	RPM	1951	
2022	Sonny Boy Williamson II	"Eyesight to the Blind"	Trumpet Records	1951	Popularized by The Who in 1969
2022	Bobby "Blue" Bland	"Farther Up the Road"	Duke Records	1957	Peaked at No. 43 on the Billboard Chart
2022	Roy Brown	"Good Rocking Tonight"	De Luxe	1947	
2022	B.B. King	"Rock Me Baby"	Kent Records	1964	Peaked at No. 34 on the Billboard Hot 100
2022	Baby Face Leroy Trio	"Rollin' and Tumblin'"	Parkway Records	1950	
2023	Lowell Fulson	"Black Nights"	Kent Records	1965	
2023	Freddy King	"I'm Tore Down"	Federal Records	1961	
2023	Lightnin' Hopkins	"Mojo Hand"	Fire Records	1960	
2023	Son House	"My Black Mama"	Paramount Records	1930	
2023	Howlin' Wolf	"The Red Rooster" (Little Red Rooster)	Chess Records	1961	
2024	Junior Parker	"Driving Wheel"	Duke Records	1961	
2024	Billy Boy Arnold	"I Ain't Got You"	Vee-Jay Records	1955	
2024	Jazz Gillum	"Key to the Highway"	Bluebird Records	1940	
2024	Clarence "Gatemouth" Brown	"Okie Dokie Stomp"	Peacock Records	1954	
2024	Lil Green	"Why Don't You Do Right?"	Bluebird Records	1941	
2025	Bessie Smith	"Nobody Knows You When You're Down and Out"	Columbia Records	1923	
2025	Sylvester Weaver	"Guitar Rag"	Okeh Records	1923	
2025	Irma Thomas	"Don't Mess with My Man"	Ron Records	1959	
2025	B.B. King	"Why I Sing the Blues"	BluesWay Records	1969	
2025	Blind Lemon Jefferson	"See That My Grave Is Kept Clean"	Paramount Records	1927	
2026	Meade Lux Lewis	"Honky Tonk Train Blues"	Paramount Records	1927	
2026	Little Brother Montgomery	"Vicksburg Blues"	Paramount Records	1930	
2026	Little Junior Parker's Blue Flames	"Feelin' Good"	Sun Records	1953	
2026	Big Bill Broonzy	"Black, Brown and White"	Vogue Records	1951	
2026	Kansas Joe & Memphis Minnie	"When the Levee Breaks"	Columbia Records	1929	

== Sources ==
- "Award Winners and Nominees". Blues Foundation. Select "Blues Hall of Fame" & "Search" for a complete list or add year and/or category for a partial list
