= Together for the First Time... Live =

Together for the First Time

Live album by Bobby Bland and B. B. King
- Released: 1974
- Genre: Soul blues
- Label: Dunhill
- Producer: Steve Barri

Bobby Bland chronology
His California Album (1973)	Together for the First Time (1974)	Bobby Bland and B. B. King Together Again...Live (1976)

B.B. King chronology
Friends (1974)	Together for the First Time... Live (1974)	Lucille Talks Back (1975)

Together for the First Time... Live is a 1974 blues album by singer Bobby Bland and guitarist B. B. King. The duo later recorded Bobby Bland and B. B. King Together Again...Live. Bland and King toured together extensively in the 1970s and 1980s, which did much to keep their careers alive during a period of otherwise popular decline for the blues genre.

Professional ratings
Review scores
Source	Rating
AllMusic	2/5 stars
Christgau's Record Guide	B+
The Penguin Guide to Blues Recordings	3/4 stars

== Track listing ==
Side one

1. "3 O'Clock in the Morning" (3:15) - (B. B. King, Jules Taub)
2. "It's My Own Fault Baby" (4:13) - (King, Taub)
3. "Driftin' Blues" (5:10) - (Charles Brown, Johnny Moore, Eddie Williams)
4. "That's the Way Love Is" (3:51) - (Deadric Malone)

Side two

1. "I'm Sorry" (9:55) - (Thompson)
2. "I'll Take Care of You" (3:50) - (Brook Benton)
3. "Don't Cry No More" (2:33) - (Malone)

Side three

1. "Don't Answer the Door" (3:52) - (Jimmy Johnson)
2. "(Medley)" (14:00)
  - "Good to Be Back Home"
  - "Driving Wheel"
  - "Rock Me Baby"
  - "Black Night"
  - "Cherry Red"
  - "It's My Own Fault Baby"
  - "3 O'Clock in the Morning"
  - "Oh, Come Back Baby"
  - "Chains of Love"
  - "Gonna Get Me an Old Woman"

Side four

1. "Everybody Wants to Know Why I Sing the Blues" (6:19) - (Dave Clark, King)
2. "Goin' Down Slow" (5:16) - (St. Louis Jimmy Oden)
3. "I Like to Live the Love" (6:00) - (Dave Crawford, Charles Mann)

== Personnel ==
Performers

- B.B. King
- Bobby Bland
- Alfred Thomas, Ben Benay, Bobby Forte, Cato Walker, Charles Polk, Edward Rowe, Harold Potier Jr., Joseph Burton, Joseph Hardin Jr., Leo Penn, Louis Hubert, Mel Brown, Melvin Jackson, Michael Omartian, Milton Hopkins, Ron Levy, Sonny Freeman, Theodore Arthur, Theodore Reynolds, Tommy Punkson, Wilbert Freeman

Technical

- Phil Kaye - recording engineer
- Fred Valentine - photography
- Alain Moreau - cover illustration
