= Friends (B. B. King album) =

Studio album by B. B. King
- Released: 1974
- Studio: Sigma Sound, Philadelphia, Pennsylvania
- Genre: Blues
- Length: 29:06
- Label: ABC
- Producer: Dave Crawford

B. B. King chronology
To Know You Is to Love You (1973)	Friends (1974)	Together for the First Time... Live (1974)

Professional ratings
Review scores
Source	Rating
AllMusic	2/5 stars
Christgau's Record Guide	C

Friends is a studio album by B. B. King, released by ABC Records in 1974. It was available in stereo under the reference ABCD-825 and in quadraphonic sound under the reference CQD-40022. This album maintains the sentimental mood initiated in the previous album To Know You Is to Love You recorded in the same studio by the same producer.

== Track listing ==
Details are from the original 1974 vinyl LP.

Side A

1. "Friends" (Dave Crawford, Charles Mann, Will Boulware) – 4:44
2. "I Got Them Blues" (Dave Crawford, Deryll Inman) – 4:31
3. "Baby I'm Yours" (Van McCoy) – 3:28
4. "Up at 5 AM" (Dave Crawford) – 3:15

Side B

1. "Philadelphia" (Dave Crawford) – 6:03
2. "When Everything Else Is Gone" (Will Boulware) – 3:08
3. "My Song" (Dave Crawford, Charles Mann) – 3:57

== Personnel ==
Musical

- B. B. King – vocals, guitar
- Dave Crawford & Charles Mann – backgrounds vocals
- Deryll Inman – guitar
- Norman Harris – guitar
- Bobby Eli as Eli Tarkesty – guitar
- Roland Chambers – guitar
- Dave Crawford – keyboards
- Will Boulware – keyboards
- Ron Kersey – keyboards
- Larry Washington – congas
- Vincent Montana Jr. – vibraphone
- Andrew Love – tenor saxophone
- Wayne Jackson – trumpet
- The Memphis Horns – horns
- Roy Renaldo & Philadelphia Strings – strings
- Wade Marcus – arrangement

Technical

- Joe Tarsia – engineer (Sigma Sound Studios, Philadelphia)
- Mike Lizzio – engineer (Las Vegas Recording Studio, Las Vegas)
