= To Know You Is to Love You (album) =

Studio album by B. B. King
- Released: 1973
- Studio: Sigma Sound, Philadelphia, Pennsylvania; The Sound Pit, Atlanta, Georgia; A&R, New York City
- Genre: Blues
- Label: ABC
- Producer: Dave Crawford

B. B. King chronology
Guess Who (1972)	To Know You Is to Love You (1973)	Friends (1974)

To Know You Is to Love You is an electric blues album by B. B. King, released in 1973. Produced by Dave Crawford in Philadelphia, it includes the participation of Stevie Wonder, the Memphis Horns, and members of MFSB, the house band for Philadelphia International Records in the early and mid-1970s.

== Reception ==
Professional ratings
Review scores
Source	Rating
AllMusic	3/5 stars
Christgau's Record Guide	B−
DownBeat	3.5/5 stars
The Penguin Guide to Blues Recordings	1.5/4 stars
The Rolling Stone Jazz Record Guide	4/5 stars

DownBeat's Pete Welding panned the contemporary and soul songs, and praised the blues performances. Describing King's singing, Welding found in the former "his voice constricted and his phrasing stiff". But in the blues "the record comes fully alive for the first lime, as his voice soars, slurs and slides like a caged bird just freed. He believes it, so he sings the living hell out of it and you're suddenly reminded of just why King's considered great".

== Track listing ==
1. "I Like to Live the Love" (Dave Crawford, Charles Mann) – 3:29
2. "Respect Yourself" (Luther Ingram, Mack Rice) – 5:13
3. "Who Are You" (Dave Crawford, Horace Johnson) – 3:55
4. "Love" (B. B. King) – 3:10
5. "I Can't Leave" (Dave Crawford) – 4:13
6. "To Know You Is to Love You" (Stevie Wonder, Syreeta Wright) – 8:42
7. "Oh to Me" (Dave Crawford) – 4:27
8. "Thank You for Loving the Blues" (B. B. King) – 6:47

== Personnel ==
- B. B. King – vocals, guitar
- Dave Crawford, Stevie Wonder, Charles Mann, Ron Kersey – keyboards
- Earl Young – drums
- Ronnie Baker – bass guitar
- Norman Harris, Roland Chambers, Bobby Eli – guitar
- Wayne Jackson – trumpet
- Andrew Love – tenor saxophone
- Larry Washington – congas
- Vincent Montana Jr. – vibraphone on "Thank You for Loving the Blues"
- Dave Crawford – arranger, conductor

Technical

- Joe Tarsia – engineer
