= Lost in the Blues =

Studio album by Otis Rush
- Released: 1991
- Recorded: 1977, 1991
- Genre: Blues, Chicago blues
- Label: Alligator
- Producer: Sam Charters

Otis Rush chronology
Blues Interaction – Live in Japan 1986 (1989)	Lost in the Blues (1991)	Live in Europe (1993)

Lost in the Blues is an album by the American musician Otis Rush, released in 1991. A version of the album titled Troubles, Troubles was released in Europe by Sonet Records.

== Production ==
Produced by Sam Charters, the majority of the album was recorded in Stockholm in 1977 and was remixed for its 1991 release to highlight Rush's vocals and guitar and Lucky Peterson's keyboard additions. Rush was allegedly displeased with the changes made by Alligator Records, and blues periodicals condemned the remixing. Bob Stroger played bass on the album. "Little Red Rooster" is a cover of the Willie Dixon song. ""You've Been an Angel" is a cover of the B.B. King song.

== Critical reception ==
Professional ratings
Review scores
Source	Rating
AllMusic	3/5 stars
Calgary Herald	A−
North County Times	4/4 stars
The Penguin Guide to Blues Recordings	2.5/4 stars
The Rolling Stone Album Guide	4.5/5 stars

The Calgary Herald deemed the album "a propulsive blues torpedo that scuttles the competition and re-establishes Rush as a powerful purveyor of soulful, stinging blues." The North County Times labeled it "one of the finest examples of electric Chicago blues ever recorded." The Detroit Free Press listed Lost in the Blues among the best blues albums of 1991. The Commercial Appeal wrote that "every guitar solo contains flashy phrases, sizzling lines and clever licks." The Rockland Journal-News concluded that "there's a confidence here that speaks of a lifetime of one-nighters, untouched by glamor or, unfortunately, much success."

AllMusic called the album "a reasonably successful enterprise, with Rush imparting his own intense twist." The Grove Press Guide to the Blues on CD noted the vocals of "almost paralyzing pain, tension, and bereavement."

== Track listing ==
No.	Title	Length
1.	"Hold That Train"
2.	"You've Been an Angel"
3.	"Little Red Rooster"
4.	"Trouble, Trouble"
5.	"Please Love Me"
6.	"You Don't Have to Go"
7.	"Got to Be Some Changes Made"
8.	"You Got Me Running"
9.	"I Miss You So"
