= Simon Napier =

British blues magazine publisher

- Born: Simon Alexander Napier; 31 October 1939; Manchester, England
- Died: 1 December 1990 (aged 51); Bexhill-on-Sea, East Sussex, England
- Occupation(s): Music historian, magazine editor

Simon Alexander Napier (31 October 1939 –1 December 1990) was a British blues magazine publisher and record label owner.

He was born in Manchester. In 1962, he set up the Blues Appreciation Society in Britain, and the following year, with researcher and discographer Mike Leadbitter, launched the magazine Blues Unlimited. With his interest in pre-war blues complementing Leadbitter's interests in post-war electric blues, Napier took responsibility for developing and expanding the magazine into an internationally recognised periodical.

After Leadbitter's death in 1974, Napier continued to manage the magazine, and also established Flyright Records, a record label and distribution company. He died from a heart attack in Sussex, England, in 1990, aged 51.
