= Six Silver Strings =

Studio album by B. B. King
- Released: 1985
- Recorded: The Studio, Hialeah, Florida
- Genre: Blues
- Label: MCA
- Producer: David Crawford, John Landis, Ira Newborn

B. B. King chronology
Why I Sing the Blues (1983)	Six Silver Strings (1985)	B. B. King and Sons Live (1990)

Professional ratings
Review scores
Source	Rating
AllMusic	2/5 stars
The Penguin Guide to Blues Recordings	1.5/4 stars

Six Silver Strings is the thirtieth studio blues album by B.B. King released in 1985. Promoted as a King's 50th album, the production is split between five David Crawford-produced tracks recorded in Miami with session musicians, and three tracks co-produced by filmmaker John Landis and his Into the Night soundtrack colleague Ira Newborn.

In a retrospective review AllMusic criticized the lackluster "pop rock" work shown in the Crawford-produced tracks, with uninspired performances from King, but praised the tunes from the Landis/Newborn session, calling "My Lucille" an "underrated signature classic." "My Lucille" was used in the film Into the Night in a scene where the lead male character walks into a bar.

== Track listing ==
1. "Six Silver Strings" (David Crawford, Luther Dixon) – 4:22
2. "Big Boss Man" (Dixon, Al Smith) – 4:48
3. "In the Midnight Hour" (Steve Cropper, Wilson Pickett) – 3:24
4. "Into the Night" (Ira Newborn) – 4:12
5. "My Lucille" (Newborn) – 3:42
6. "Memory Lane" (Crawford, Dixon) – 4:35
7. "My Guitar Sings the Blues" (Crawford, Dixon) – 3:39
8. "Double Trouble" (Crawford, Dixon) – 5:14
