= I Am the Blues =

Studio album by Willie Dixon
- Released: 1970
- Genre: Blues
- Length: 43:29
- Label: Columbia
- Producer: Abner Spector

Willie Dixon chronology
At the Village Gate (1960)	I Am the Blues (1970)	Catalyst (1973)

I Am the Blues is the sixth studio Chicago blues album released in 1970 by the well-known bluesman Willie Dixon. It is also the title of Dixon's autobiography, edited by Don Snowden.

The album features songs written by Dixon and originally performed by other artists for Chess Records.

== Original performances ==
Four of the nine songs on I Am the Blues – "Back Door Man", "Spoonful", "I Ain't Superstitious", "The Little Red Rooster" – were originally performed by Howlin' Wolf. "Back Door Man" and "Spoonful" were recorded by Howlin' Wolf in June 1960 featuring bass work by Willie Dixon, piano work by Otis Spann, drum work by Fred Below, and guitar work by Hubert Sumlin. "The Little Red Rooster" was recorded in June 1961 with guitar work by Howlin' Wolf and Hubert Sumlin, piano work by Johnny Jones, bass work by Dixon, and drum work by Sam Lay. "I Ain't Superstitious" was recorded in December 1961 with Howlin' Wolf, Hubert Sumlin, and Jimmy Rogers on guitar, Henry Gray on piano, Willie Dixon on bass, and Sam Lay on drums.

The songs "You Shook Me", "I'm Your Hoochie Coochie Man", and "The Same Thing" were first recorded by Muddy Waters. "I'm Your Hoochie Coochie Man" was recorded on January 7, 1954 with Waters on vocals and guitar, Little Walter on harmonica, Jimmy Rogers on guitar, Otis Spann on piano, Willie Dixon on bass, and Fred Below on drums. "You Shook Me" was recorded on June 27, 1962 and "The Same Thing" was recorded on April 9, 1964.

"The Seventh Son" was recorded by Willie Mabon in 1955. "I Can't Quit You, Baby" was not even released on Chess Records; instead it was recorded and released by Otis Rush on the Cobra record label.

== Reception ==
Professional ratings
Review scores
Source	Rating
AllMusic	3/5 stars
Christgau's Record Guide	B
The Penguin Guide to Blues Recordings	2.5/4 stars
The Rolling Stone Album Guide	4/5 stars

The AllMusic review of the album by Bruce Eder has the opinion that the production on the album was well done, but that the original performances were still better. Robert Christgau feels that Dixon's singing ability on the album is not as good as it could be, because he doesn't need to be a good singer since he's a good composer and producer.

== Accolades ==
The album was inducted into the Blues Hall of Fame in 1986.

== Track listing ==
All music and lyrics written by Willie Dixon, except as indicated.

Side one

1. "Back Door Man" – 6:08
2. "I Can't Quit You, Baby" – 6:40
3. "The Seventh Son" – 4:15
4. "Spoonful" – 4:56

Side two.

1. "I Ain't Superstitious" – 4:03
2. "You Shook Me" (Willie Dixon, J.B. Lenoir) – 4:15
3. "(I'm Your) Hoochie Coochie Man" – 4:48
4. "The Little Red Rooster" – 3:36
5. "The Same Thing" – 4:40

== Personnel ==
The following people contributed to I Am the Blues:

- Willie Dixon – vocals, bass

Chicago Blues All Stars

- Walter Horton – harmonica
- Lafayette Leake – piano
- Sunnyland Slim – piano
- Johnny Shines – guitar
- Clifton James – drums

Technical

- Abner Spector – producer
- Virginia Team – cover design
- Peter Amft – photography
