= Theresa Needham =

Theresa McLaurin Needham (April 17, 1912 – October 16, 1992) was an American tavern owner who became known as "the Godmother of the Chicago blues". She was posthumously inducted into the Blues Hall of Fame in 2001.

Born Theresa McLaurin in Meridian, Mississippi, she was raised Catholic, married Robert Needham and moved to Chicago in the 1940s.

In December 1949 she opened a basement club, Theresa's Lounge (sometimes also called T’s Basement), in an apartment building on South Indiana Avenue on the South Side of Chicago. This attracted a predominantly black audience from the surrounding neighbourhood, but its appeal reached global proportions as a result of the calibre of music offered. It featured live entertainment with Junior Wells and Buddy Guy in the house band, and attracted touring musicians such as Muddy Waters, Jimmy Rogers, Otis Spann, Little Walter, Otis Rush, Earl Hooker and Howlin' Wolf.

The club relocated in 1983 when the landlord refused to renew the lease, and closed permanently in 1986. Theresa Needham died in Chicago in 1992. In 2010, the Black Ensemble Theater Company in Chicago produced a play based on Theresa's Lounge, written by Joe Plummer and called Nothing But The Blues.
