= Amy van Singel =

American radio host and music journalist

Amelia ("Amy") van Singel (October 11, 1949 – September 19, 2016) was an American blues journalist and radio host. She co-founded Living Blues magazine with her then-husband, Jim O'Neal, and was posthumously inducted to the Blues Hall of Fame in 2017.

== Life and career ==
Amy van Singel was born in Chicago, the daughter of a bank executive, and grew up in the suburb of Hinsdale, Illinois. After hearing records by British R&B bands such as the Rolling Stones in her teens, she developed a love of blues music and occasionally worked at Bob Koester's Jazz Record Mart. She attended Hinsdale Township High School, and enrolled at Endicott College in Beverly, Massachusetts in 1967, transferring to Northwestern University in 1968.

There, she met fellow blues fan Jim O'Neal, and began broadcasting on WNUR, where she became known as "Atomic Mama". She and O'Neal married in 1970. They started interviewing local Chicago blues musicians, and, with others, founded Living Blues the same year. O'Neal said: "We embarked on a mission to bring recognition to the blues originators and the living African American blues tradition, first with some interviews we sent to Blues Unlimited.... I didn’t have to hide my record-buying habit from my wife. We shared in that pursuit and just about everything else, loving the blues and our life together. We decided not to have children, but poured our energy into birthing and parenting Living Blues."

She and O'Neal published the magazine from their home in Chicago until 1983, when production moved to Oxford, Mississippi. She also had a radio show on WXFM in the early 1970s. The couple remained in Chicago until 1986; they divorced the following year. Van Singel moved to Oxford, and then to Memphis, Tennessee, where she also had a radio show. Later, she moved to Anchorage, Alaska, where she again had her own radio show, for ten years.

She remarried and moved to Ellsworth, Maine, in 2010. She died in her home there in 2016, aged 66. She was inducted into the Blues Hall of Fame in 2017.
