= Big Boss Man (song) =

1961 song by Jimmy Reed

Single by Jimmy Reed

from the album Found Love
- B-side: "I'm a Love You"
- Released: April 1961
- Recorded: Chicago, March 29, 1960
- Genre: Blues
- Length: 2:46
- Label: Vee-Jay
- Songwriters: Luther Dixon, Al Smith

Jimmy Reed singles chronology
"Close Together" (1961)	"Big Boss Man" (1961)	"Bright Lights, Big City" (1961)

"Big Boss Man" is a blues song first recorded by Jimmy Reed in 1960. It became one of his most popular songs, although the songwriting is credited to Luther Dixon and Al Smith. Chicago-based Vee-Jay Records released it as a single, which became one of Reed's last appearances on the record charts. The song has been recorded by artists in diverse styles, including Elvis Presley, B.B. King, and Hope Sandoval, who also had chart successes with the song.

== Original song ==
"Big Boss Man" is an uptempo twelve-bar blues shuffle that features "one of the most influential Reed grooves of all time". It is credited to Jimmy Reed's manager, Al Smith, and Vee-Jay Records staff writer Luther Dixon. The song is one of the few Reed hits that was written by someone other than Reed and his wife Mama Reed.

Reed recorded the song in Chicago on March 29, 1960; backing Reed, who sang and played harmonica and guitar, are Mama Reed on vocal, Lee Baker and Lefty Bates on guitars, Willie Dixon on bass, and Earl Phillips on drums.

"Big Boss Man" was originally released on Jimmy Reed's 1960 album Found Love. In 1961, Vee-Jay Records released it as a single, which reached number 13 on Billboard's R&B Hot Sides chart and number 78 on its Hot 100 chart.

== Legacy ==
In 1990, the song was inducted into the Blues Foundation Hall of Fame. In its induction statement, blues historian Jim O'Neal noted that the song's appeal went beyond blues musicians and:

If there ever was a blues theme for the proletariat, it was Jimmy Reed’s 1961 smash, "Big Boss Man". "You got me workin', boss man, workin' 'round the clock, I want me a drink of water but you won’t let Jimmy stop," Reed sang, but the refrain asserted "You ain’t so big, you’re just tall, that’s all."

The Rock and Roll Hall of Fame included it in its 1995 list of the "500 Songs That Shaped Rock and Roll".

As one of Reed's best-known songs, "Big Boss Man" has been recorded by numerous artists. In 1967, a version by Elvis Presley from the Clambake soundtrack reached number 38 on the Billboard Hot 100 singles chart. He performed the song as part of a medley during the Elvis 1968 Comeback Special. "Big Boss Man" was covered by the Syndicate of Sound on their first album, "Little Girl." In their early days, "Big Boss Man" was part of the Grateful Dead's concert repertoire. It was usually sung by Ron "Pigpen" McKernan, who also provided blues-style harmonica accompaniment. According to group chronicler David Malvinni, McKernan's "powerful voice" was well-suited to deliver convincing renditions of older blues songs, compared to vocals by other blues revival bands. A live recording first appeared on their 1971 self-titled album.

B.B. King recorded the song for his 1985 album Six Silver Strings. Released on a single by MCA Records, his rendition reached number 62 on Billboard's Hot Black singles chart. Hope Sandoval recorded the song for Mercury Rev's 2019 album Bobbie Gentry's The Delta Sweete Revisited. An album review noted: "Hope Sandoval takes 'Big Boss Man' in just the way you'd want and expect Hope Sandoval to take 'Big Boss Man' – like it's an old Velvet Underground ballad she's just heard."
