= Bobby Bland and B. B. King Together Again...Live =

Live album by Bobby Bland and B. B. King
- Released: 1976
- Venue: Coconut Grove, Los Angeles
- Genre: Blues
- Label: ABC
- Producer: Esmond Edwards

Bobby Bland chronology
Together for the First Time (1974)	Bobby Bland and B. B. King Together Again...Live (1976)	Years of Tears (1993)

B. B. King chronology
Lucille Talks Back (1975)	Bobby Bland and B. B. King Together Again...Live (1976)	King Size (1977)

Bobby Bland and B. B. King Together Again...Live is a live album recorded in 1976 at the Coconut Grove in Los Angeles by Bobby Bland and B. B. King.

Professional ratings
Review scores
Source	Rating
AllMusic	2/5 stars
Christgau's Record Guide	B−
The Penguin Guide to Blues Recordings	3/4 stars

== Track listing ==
Side A

1. "Let The Good Times Roll" (Sam Theard, Fleecie Moore) – 5:40
2. Medley:
  - "Stormy Monday Blues" (Aaron T-Bone Walker) – 3:00
  - "Strange Things Happen" (Percy Mayfield) – 3:58
3. "Feel So Bad" (Sam "Lightnin'" Hopkins) – 8:22

Side B

1. Medley:
  - "Mother-In-Law Blues" (Don Robey) – 3:00
  - "Mean Old World" ("Little" Walter Jacobs) – 2:40
2. "Every Day (I Have The Blues)" (Peter Chatman) – 3:58
3. Medley:
  - "The Thrill Is Gone" (Roy Hawkins, Rick Darnell) – 12:35
  - "I Ain't Gonna Be The First To Cry" (Michael Price, Dan Welsh, Mitch Bottler) – 02:00

== Personnel ==
- Bobby Bland, B. B. King – vocals
- B. B. King, Milton Hopkins, Johnny Jones, Ray Parker – guitar
- Rudy Aikels, Louis Villery – bass guitar
- John "Jabo" Starks, Harold Potier – drums
- James Toney – organ
- Robert Anderson – piano
- Red Holloway – tenor saxophone
- Jerome Richardson – baritone saxophone
- Oscar Brashear, Albert Aarons, Snooky Young – trumpet
- Garnett Brown, Benny Powell – trombone
- Viola Jackson – voice from audience on "The Thrill Is Gone"

== Other credits ==
- Horns arranged by Johnny Pate
- Principal Engineer: Barney Perkins
