= Blues & Rhythm =

British monthly music magazine

- Editor: Tony Burke
- Categories: Music magazine
- Frequency: 6 per year
- First issue: July 1984; 42 years ago
- Country: United Kingdom
- Based in: Bromham
- Language: English
- Website: www.bluesandrhythm.co.uk
- ISSN: 1360-8657
- OCLC: 20811020

Blues & Rhythm is a British music magazine dealing with all aspects of blues and gospel music. Founded in July 1984 it is - along with its American counterpart Living Blues - considered to be the premier magazine for all aspects of research into blues and rhythm & blues music (pre- and post-war blues, rhythm and blues, doo-wop vocal groups, vintage soul, gospel and the contemporary blues scene).

Blues & Rhythm was founded by record collector Paul Vernon in 1984, with the editorship passing to Tony Burke in 1986. The magazine's team of writers and reviewers consists of record collectors, and some of the world's foremost experts on the history of blues/R&B/doo-wop/gospel and soul. Blues & Rhythm is run by an editorial board, since its inception it has carried on the long tradition of research into blues, R&B and gospel music including artists, musicians, record companies and associated subjects. Colin Larkin described the publication, along with Blueprint, and Juke Blues as "all admirable magazines".

Blues & Rhythm's roots go back to magazines such as the pioneering Blues Unlimited, first published in England in the early 1960s, as well as other specialist magazines including Pickin' The Blues, Sailors Delight and Old Time Music.

Blues & Rhythm has published major ground-breaking research on some of the major blues musicians including Muddy Waters, Robert Johnson, Big Bill Broonzy, John Lee Hooker, B. B. King, T-Bone Walker and many others, and also specialises in searching out the lesser-known artists and musicians, as well as owners of record companies and details of record labels, who contributed to the century-long history.

The magazine also features discographies, as well as reviews of recent blues festivals and gigs; news from the blues world; obituaries; and a lively letters pages where collectors and fans exchange information. The magazine's extensive review section covers all the latest new and reissue CDs; DVDs, vinyl, books etc.

It has also publishes updates and corrections to the most important published historical discographies of blues and gospel music.

Usually 48 pages in length, the magazine is published six times a year, every two months.

In 2006, the Blues & Rhythm Magazine was inducted into the category "Classics of Blues Literature" of the Blues Hall of Fame.
