= Ain't Enough Comin' In =

Studio album by Otis Rush
- Released: 1994
- Genre: Blues, Chicago blues
- Label: This Way Up/Mercury
- Producer: John Porter

Otis Rush chronology
| Blues Interaction: Live in Japan 1986 with Break Down (1994) | Ain't Enough Comin' In (1994) | Live & Awesome (1996) |

Ain't Enough Comin' In is an album by the American musician Otis Rush, released in 1994. It was Rush's first studio album in more than 15 years. Ain't Enough Comin' In was regarded as a successful comeback album.

The album was nominated for a Grammy Award for "Best Traditional Blues Album". The title track won a W.C. Handy Award for "Song of the Year". Rush supported the album with a UK tour.

== Production ==
Recorded in Los Angeles, the album was produced by John Porter. Ian McLagan played organ on the album; Billy Payne played piano. The song "Homework" was first recorded by Rush in 1962, for Duke Records. "A Fool for You" is a cover of the Ray Charles song.

The album employed many of the same musicians as Buddy Guy's Feels Like Rain.

== Critical reception ==
Professional ratings
Review scores
| Source | Rating |
|---|---|
| AllMusic | 4.5/5 stars |
| The Encyclopedia of Popular Music | 4/5 stars |
| MusicHound R&B: The Essential Album Guide | 4/5 stars |
| The Penguin Guide to Blues Recordings | 3.5/4 stars |
| USA Today | 3.5/4 stars |

Entertainment Weekly declared that "singing and playing with Rush’s smoldering authority and depth ought to be illegal—or at least declared dangerous." The Chicago Tribune appreciated that "there are no duet distractions on a well-constructed program that's dominated by sizzling covers of vintage Sam Cooke, Ray Charles and Louis Jordan songs." The New York Times called the album "excellent," writing that "Rush is one of the finest living exponents of Chicago blues."

Rolling Stone opined that, "while Ain't Enough Comin' In would need a bit more frenzy on the frets to be the ultimate Otis Rush album, it's one of the best blues discs of the decade." Stereo Review called Ain't Enough Comin' In "a strong album by a master talent," writing that "particularly satisfying is the title track, with its savvy allusion to the bass line that drove Michael Jackson's 'Billy Jean'." USA Today deemed it "a solid step toward righting an often fumbled career."

AllMusic wrote that "everything that makes Otis a unique master of his form is here to savor, from his passionate vocals to the shimmering finger vibrato he applies to the liquid tones of his Fender Stratocaster." MusicHound R&B: The Essential Album Guide thought that it "has the best sound of any Rush album."

== Track listing ==
| No. | Title | Writer(s) | Length |
|---|---|---|---|
| 1. | "Don't Burn Down the Bridge" | Allen Alvoid Jones Jr. & Carl Lewis Wells | 4:29 |
| 2. | "That Will Never Do" | Little Milton | 3:24 |
| 3. | "Somebody Have Mercy" |
| 4. | "A Fool for You" |
| 5. | "Homework" |
| 6. | "My Jug and I" |
| 7. | "She's a Good 'Un" |
| 8. | "It's My Own Fault" |
| 9. | "Ain't Enough Comin' In" |
| 10. | "If I Had Any Sense, I'd Go Back Home" |
| 11. | "Ain't That Good News" |
| 12. | "As the Years Go Passing By" |
