= Arnold Shaw (writer) =

American music writer

- Born: Arnold Shukotoff; June 28, 1909; Brooklyn, New York City, United States
- Died: September 26, 1989 (aged 80); Las Vegas, Nevada, United States
- Occupations: Writer, music publishing executive, teacher, composer

Arnold Shaw (born Arnold Shukotoff, June 28, 1909–September 26, 1989) was an American music writer, music publishing executive, teacher and songwriter. He is best known for his comprehensive series of books on 20th century American popular music.

== Biography ==
He was born in Brooklyn, New York City, the son of Russian Jewish immigrants, and studied at the City College of New York and Columbia University, where he took a master's degree in English literature in 1931. He undertook further studies in American Literature at New York University, played piano in a group, the Harmony Collegians, and started composing songs.

He worked as a teacher at City College, and in the 1930s became known as a radical member and activist in the Anti-Fascist Association of the Staffs of the City College and the Instructional Staff Association, and was the first president of the College Teachers Union. He was one of the 40 staff members who were dismissed in 1942 following the investigation by the Rapp-Coudert Committee into the left-wing political sympathies of teaching staff in New York.

He then changed his name from Shukotoff to Shaw, and worked as a pianist and composer. His best-known compositions include "Mobiles", "The Mod Moppet: Seven Nursery Rip-offs", and "Sing a Song of Americans", for which Rosemary and Stephen Vincent Benét wrote the lyrics. In the early 1940s he was also the popular music editor for Swank magazine. His first book, a biography of drummer Gene Krupa, was published in 1945. Shaw entered the popular music business in 1945, as director of publicity and advertising for Leeds Music (later to become MCA Music). He went on from there to Hill and Range, and then the Edward B. Marks Music Corporation, also a music publishing company, where he worked between 1955 and 1966. He also handled public relations and advertising for a number of individual performers, including Elvis Presley, Burt Bacharach and Paul Simon.

Shaw wrote many music reviews, articles and books, including histories of popular music from the 1920s to the 1960s, and books on jazz and other African-American music. He published Lingo of Tin-Pan Alley in 1950; a novel, The Money Song in 1953; and a biography of Harry Belafonte in 1960. His significant career as a writer, however, came in the 1970s and 1980s, beginning with the 1969 publication of The Rock Revolution: What's Happening to Today's Music. His 1978 book Honkers And Shouters. The Golden Years of Rhythm and Blues, which incorporates interviews with many leading figures from the period, is considered the definitive text on that musical form, and he was posthumously inducted into the Blues Hall of Fame. Another well-regarded book, The Street that Never Slept: New York’s Fabled 52nd Street, looked at the jazz clubs in the area in the 1930s. He won the Deems Taylor Award from ASCAP in 1968 and 1979. He also composed a musical, They Had a Dream (1976).

From the 1960s, he lectured at many colleges. After moving to Las Vegas in 1968, he taught part-time at the University of Nevada. In 1985, Shaw founded the Popular Music Research Center, later renamed the Arnold Shaw Popular Music Research Center, which today contains approximately 20,000 records, over 1000 manuscript scores, over 300 taped interviews of popular music artists, and miscellaneous memorabilia.

He died from cancer in Las Vegas in 1989, aged 80.

== Bibliography ==
- Gene Krupa, Pin-Up Press. 1945
- Lingo of Tin-Pan Alley, Broadcast Music, Inc., 1950
- The Money Song (novel), Random House, 1953
- Belafonte: An Unauthorized Biography, Chilton, 1960
- The Rock Revolution: What's Happening to Today's Music, Crowell-Collier Press, New York, 1969
- The World of Soul: Black America's contribution to the pop music scene, Cowles Book Co., 1970
- The Street That Never Slept. Coward, McCann & Geoghegan, Inc., 1971; reissued as 52nd Street: The Street of Jazz, Da Capo Press, New York, 1977
- Frank Sinatra. Retreat of the Romantic, Coronet Books, 1974
- The Rockin' 50s. The Decade That Transformed the Pop Music Scene, Hawthorn Books, New York, 1974.
- Honkers and Shouters. The Golden Years of Rhythm and Blues. Crowell-Collier Press, New York, 1978
- Dictionary of American Pop-Rock Music. Sales Corp, 1982 and Schirmer Books, 1983
- Sinatra: The Entertainer, Delilah Books, 1984
- Black Popular Music In America. From The Spirituals, Minstrels And Ragtime To Soul, Disco And Hip-Hop, Schirmer Books. 1986.
- The Jazz Age: Popular Music in the 1920s, Oxford University Press, New York, 1987
- Let's Dance: Popular Music in the 1930s, (edited by Bill Willard,) Oxford University Press, New York, 1998
