= Lucille Talks Back =

Studio album by B. B. King
- Released: 1975
- Genre: Blues
- Length: 42:20
- Label: ABC
- Producer: B. B. King

B. B. King chronology
Together for the First Time (1974)	Lucille Talks Back (1975)	Bobby Bland and B.B. King Together Again...Live (1976)

Professional ratings
Review scores
Source	Rating
Christgau's Record Guide	B+
MusicHound Rock: The Essential Album Guide	3.5/5 stars
The Rolling Stone Album Guide	4/5 stars

Lucille Talks Back is an album by B. B. King, released in 1975. B.B. King produced it himself and recorded it with his own orchestra. It is not to be confused with a compilation of the same name, released in 1988.

The album was out of print until it was re-released as a bonus disc as part of the iTunes edition of the 2012 box set Ladies and Gentlemen... Mr. B. B. King.

== Track listing ==
Side A

1. "Lucille Talks Back (Copulation)" [instrumental] (B.B.King) - 2:25
2. "Breaking Up Somebody's Home" (Al Jackson, Jr., Timothy Matthews) - 2:58
3. "Reconsider Baby" (Lowell Fulson) - 2:53
4. "Don't Make Me Pay For His Mistakes" (Bobby Lexing, Miles Grayson) - 3:15

Side B

1. "When I'm Wrong" (B. B. King) - 6:11
2. "I Know The Price" (B. B. King) - 3:06
3. "Have Faith" (Shirrell Sutton) - 2:36
4. "Everybody Lies A Little" (Jackson, King) - 3:43

== Personnel ==
- B.B. King - guitar, vocals
- Jesse Daniel Houck, Milton Hopkins - rhythm guitar
- Rudy Aikels - bass guitar
- Ron Levy - piano, synthesizer
- James Toney - Hammond organ
- John "Jabo" Starks - drums
- Marcus Barnett - percussion
- Bobby Forte - tenor saxophone, baritone saxophone
- Cato Walker III - alto saxophone
- Herbert Hardisty - tenor saxophone, trumpet
- Eddie Rowe - trumpet, flugelhorn
- Joseph Burton - trombone
- B. B. King, Eddie Rowe, Hampton Reese - arrangements

Technical

- Tom Wilkes - art direction
- Martin Donald - design
- Jim McCrary - photography
