= Little Walter and Otis Rush "Live in Chicago" =

Unofficial live album by Little Walter and Otis Rush

Live in Chicago

Live album (unofficial) by Little Walter & Otis Rush
- Genre: Blues

Ratings of similar albums
Review scores
Source	Rating
AllMusic Blues Masters	link
AllMusic Windy City Blues	link
AllMusic Live at the Chicago Blues Festival	link

Live in Chicago is an album of live recordings by Little Walter and Otis Rush, recorded at the University of Chicago's Mandel Hall on May 20, 1966, although often credited to other dates and venues. According to the All Music Guide to the Blues, "These live performances have been circulating around bootleg channels under a plethora of titles for decades." Some of these titles include:

- At the Chicago Blues Festival
- Blues Masters
- Little Walter & Otis Rush
- Live at the Chicago Blues Festival
- Live in the Windy City
- Windy City Blues

== Track listing ==
Tracks 1–4 feature Otis Rush and tracks 5–8 feature Little Walter (composer credit, when known, follows the track name.)

1. "It's So Hard for Me to Believe You Baby"
2. "May Be the Last Time" (James Brown)
3. "I Got You (I Feel Good)" (James Brown)
4. "Otis' Blue" (Otis Rush)
5. "Goin' Down Slow" (James Oden)
6. "Walter's Blues" (Walter Jacobs)
7. "You're So Fine" (Jacobs)
8. "Watermelon Man" (Herbie Hancock)
