= Mourning in the Morning =

Mourning In the Morning

Studio album by Otis Rush
- Released: August 1969
- Recorded: 1969
- Studios: FAME, Muscle Shoals, Alabama
- Genre: Blues
- Length: 39:43
- Label: Cotillion
- Producers: Nick Gravenites, Mike Bloomfield

Otis Rush chronology
Mourning In the Morning (1969)	Screamin' and Cryin (1974)

Mourning In the Morning is an album by the American blues singer and guitarist Otis Rush, released in 1969. Though Rush had been cutting singles since 1955, this was his first album. It infuses Rush's deep blues sound with soul and rock. The album was panned by many critics, but has since developed a cult following.

Originally released on Cotillion, the album was re-released in the early 1990s; it was also re-released in 2006 by Collectables Records.

== Production ==
Mourning in the Morning was coproduced by Mike Bloomfield and Nick Gravenites. It was recorded at FAME Studios, in Muscle Shoals, Alabama. Duane Allman and members of the Muscle Shoals Rhythm Section played on the album.

== Critical reception ==
Professional ratings
Review scores
Source	Rating
AllMusic	3/5 stars
Chicago Tribune	3/4 stars
The Encyclopedia of Popular Music	3/5 stars
Rolling Stone	(mixed)

Reviewing a reissue, the Chicago Tribune wrote that "an instrumental workout on Aretha Franklin`s 'Baby I Love You' is a spine-chilling showcase for the southpaw guitarist`s extraordinary string bending."

== Track listing ==
Except where otherwise noted, tracks composed by Otis Rush

1. "Me" (Mike Bloomfield, Nick Gravenites) - 2:55
2. "Working Man" (Mike Bloomfield, Nick Gravenites) - 2:25
3. "You're Killing My Love" (Mike Bloomfield, Nick Gravenites) - 3:00
4. "Feel So Bad" (Chuck Willis) - 3:39
5. "Gambler's Blues" (B.B. King, Jules Taub) - 5:39
6. "Baby, I Love You" (Ronnie Shannon) - 3:09
7. "My Old Lady" (Mike Bloomfield, Nick Gravenites) - 2:11
8. "My Love Will Never Die" - 4:33
9. "Reap What You Sow" (Paul Butterfield, Mike Bloomfield, Nick Gravenites) - 4:54
10. "It Takes Time" - 3:26
11. "Can't Wait No Longer" (Mike Bloomfield, Nick Gravenites) - 3:52

== Personnel ==
Musicians

- Otis Rush - vocals, guitar
- Aaron Varnell - tenor saxophone
- Joe Arnold - tenor saxophone
- Ronald Eades - baritone saxophone
- Gene "Bowlegs" Miller - trumpet
- Jimmy Johnson - guitar
- Duane Allman - guitar (Tracks 1, 3–4, 9–11)
- Jerry Jemmott - bass
- Barry Beckett - keyboards
- Mark Naftalin - keyboards
- Roger Hawkins - drums

Production

- Nick Gravenites - producer
- Mike Bloomfield - producer
- Mickey Buckins - Recording engineer
- Norris McNamara - photography
- Nick Gravenites - liner notes

== Other sources ==
1. Rush, Otis. "Mourning in the Morning" Sound Recording. Collectables Records. 2006.
