= Juke Blues =

British magazine

- Editor: Cilla Huggins
- Categories: Blues, R&B, soul, jazz
- Frequency: Previously at least twice-yearly, now irregularly
- First issue: 1985
- Country: United Kingdom
- Based in: Bristol
- Website: JukeBlues.com
- ISSN: 1351-5551

Juke Blues is a British magazine covering blues, R&B, gospel, soul, zydeco, and jazz. It was established in 1985 in London by Cilla Huggins, John Broven, and Bez Turner, and is now published in Bath, Somerset, England. Cilla Huggins has been sole editor since 1992.

The magazine contains a mixture of biographical articles on blues and related musicians, both active and historic, as well as interviews, discographies, and reviews. Regular contributors have included Mick Huggins, John Broven, John Barnie, Scott M. Bock, Dave Clarke, Tony Collins, Ray Ellis, Alan Empson, Martin Goggin, Mark Harris, Paul Harris, André Hobus, Ian Jones, Ian Marriss, Seamus McGarvey, Steve Millward, Bill Moodie, Dick Shurman, Brian Smith, Chris Smith, Richard Tapp, Dave Williams, Val Wilmer, Axel Küstner, Norbert Hess, Joe Rosen, and Gene Tomko.

Colin Larkin described the publication, along with Blueprint, and Blues and Rhythm as "all admirable magazines".

Until his death, Ike Turner had the position of Honorary President.

== Awards ==
Awards won by the magazine include:

- Keeping The Blues Alive, 2000
- Sweet Soul Music, 2001
- Blues Hall of Fame Classic of Blues Literature, 2004
