= Paul Vernon =

- Born: 5 July 1949; Hampstead, London, England
- Died: 9 December 2024 (aged 75); Kilmarnock, Virginia, U.S.
- Other names: "Sailor" Vernon
- Occupation(s): Record collector, discographer, writer

Paul "Sailor" Vernon (5 July 1949 – 9 December 2024) was a British blues expert, record collector, discographer, writer and magazine editor.

== Biography ==
Paul Vernon was born in Hampstead, London, moving with his parents in 1964 to Hertford, where he studied at the Hertford College of Further Education. He developed a love of jazz and blues music, and began purchasing records, largely by mail order, as well as attending American Folk Blues Festival shows in England. After returning to live in London in 1966, he worked at his parents' newsagent shop while developing his interest in pre-war and post-war blues and jazz, and expanding his record collection. He established connections with other blues collectors and experts, as well as with many musicians, and began writing for magazines such as Blues World. He published a discography of Sun Records in 1968.

In 1976, he began selling and auctioning blues records by mail order; the nickname "Sailor Vernon" arose from among his friends at that time. He made trips to the U.S. to acquire further collections, and in 1978 started a record sales magazine, Sailor's Delight, which included serious research alongside "an irreverent approach to blues music (and blues collectors) including listing non-existent records for auction." His home in Mill Hill became a regular meeting place for British blues aficionados. The magazine continued until 1984, when Vernon established a new magazine, Blues & Rhythm, as well as starting to work for a record distributor, Making Waves, and the associated Rapid record label.

He moved to San Francisco with his second wife in 1986, and established another short-lived magazine, Old Sailor's Almanac, but returned to London in 1989, and worked for the Mechanical-Copyright Protection Society (MCPS). After developing an interest in Portuguese fado music, he researched the EMI archives and wrote on a wide range of early ethnic music recordings from different parts of the world, as well as blues. He resumed record trading, and worked on music documentaries as well as several books, including Ethnic and Vernacular Music on Record 1898–1960 (1995), A History of the Portuguese Fado (1998), and African-American Blues, Rhythm and Blues, Gospel and Zydeco on Film and Video, 1926–1997 (1999).

In 1997 he returned to live in the U.S. and became a naturalized citizen after marrying a diplomat. The following year, he moved to Prague where he worked as a community liaison officer under the U.S. embassy. While there he met the American illustrator Gene Deitch, who had made private recordings of John Lee Hooker performing live in 1951, which Vernon arranged to have released. He also wrote for Folk Roots magazine and contributed to Martin Scorsese's series The Blues.

He later lived in France and Spain, before retiring to live in Virginia. In 2008 he published a memoir, Last Swill and Testament, and in 2011 established the Real Blues Forum page on Facebook. In later years he developed Alzheimer's disease.

Vernon was married three times. He died in Kilmarnock, Virginia, on 9 December 2024 at the age of 75.
