= Herwin Records =

- Founded: 1924
- Founder: Herbert Schiele; Edwin Schiele
- Defunct: 1930
- Status: Inactive
- Genre: Jazz, blues, old-time
- Country of origin: U.S.
- Location: St. Louis, Missouri

Herwin Records was a mail-order record label founded in 1925 by two brothers, Herbert and Edwin Schiele in St. Louis, Missouri. The name of the label comes from their first names (HERbert and EdWIN).

Herwin sold budget jazz, blues, and old-time music discs that were pressed by Gennett and Paramount. The records were advertised in farming magazines and sold through the mail. The catalogue included Charley Patton, Chubby Parker, and Ernest Stoneman.

Herwin closed in 1930 when it was bought by the Wisconsin Chair Company, the owner of Paramount. A second Herwin Records was started in 1971 by Bernard Klatzko, a collector who reissued rare, early-jazz discs.

== See also ==
- List of record labels
