= Mike Leadbitter =

British writer, researcher and editor

- Born: Michael Andrew Leadbitter; 12 March 1942; Simla, India
- Died: 16 November 1974 (aged 32); London, England
- Occupations: Blues writer and discographer

Michael Andrew Leadbitter (12 March 1942 – 16 November 1974) was a British writer, researcher, magazine editor, and a leading authority on blues music, who had an important role in the revival of interest in the blues, particularly in the UK in the 1960s and early 1970s.

== Biography ==
Mike Leadbitter was born in Simla, India, but grew up in Bexhill-on-Sea, England. He attended Bexhill Grammar School, and began buying rock and roll and rhythm and blues records and magazines in his mid teens, often on import from the US.

In 1962, with his friend Simon Napier, he formed the Blues Appreciation Society, which the following year led to the publication of a magazine, Blues Unlimited, the first English-language blues periodical. He took on the role of reviews editor, and was particularly responsible for compiling discographies of major blues artists such as B.B. King, Muddy Waters, Elmore James, and John Lee Hooker. Following his first research trip to the US in 1967, he compiled, with Neil Slaven, the groundbreaking discography Blues Records 1943-1966. Through a great many articles and discographical research led the way in documenting the careers and recordings of hitherto under-recognised blues musicians.

He edited a collection of Blues Unlimited articles as the book Nothing But the Blues (1971), compiled albums for various record labels, and coordinated research among a global network of blues fans. In 1972, he began working for Hanover Books, including their magazines Jazz & Blues and Let It Rock for which he was advertising manager, and the following year took over the sole editorship of Blues Unlimited, at the same time as preparing two books for publication. His health suffered through overwork, and after contracting a virus he developed meningitis, dying in hospital in London in 1974 at the age of 32.

In 2009, he was posthumously inducted into the Blues Hall of Fame as a non-performer.
