= Dave Clark (promoter) =

African-American record promoter (1909–1995)

- Born: March 6, 1909; Jackson, Tennessee, USA
- Died: July 22, 1995 (aged 86)
- Occupation: Record promoter

Dave Clark (March 6, 1909 – July 22, 1995) in Jacksonville, Florida, was a pioneering African-American record promoter.

Born in Jackson, Tennessee, Clark became interested in music after a teacher gave him piano and violin lessons. He later learned band music and performed as a teenager with traveling minstrel shows.

He graduated from Lane College in Jackson in 1934 and from the Juilliard School in New York City in 1939. He began promoting for Decca Records in 1938, beginning with Jimmie Lunceford. This launched a career as a promoter for most major labels that recorded African-American music. He worked for Duke/Peacock for 17 years, and also spent time with Chess, Aladdin, Apollo, United, Stax, and TK, before moving to Malaco in 1980.

Clark also served as the musical consultant for several movies, including The Color Purple. He wrote a column for Down Beat magazine during the 1960s called "Swing Row Is My Beat". Clark had over 60 songs to his credit, including B.B. King's "Why I Sing the Blues". He was given a Pioneer Award by the Rhythm and Blues Foundation in 1993.

In 2013, Clark was posthumously inducted to the Blues Hall of Fame.
