= Right Place, Wrong Time (album) =

Studio album by Otis Rush
- Released: February 1976
- Recorded: February 1971
- Genre: Blues
- Length: 40:44
- Label: Bullfrog
- Producer: Nick Gravenites, Otis Rush

Otis Rush chronology
So Many Roads (1976)	Right Place, Wrong Time (1976)	Troubles, Troubles (1978)

Professional ratings
Review scores
Source	Rating
AllMusic	4.5/5 stars
The Penguin Guide to Blues Recordings	3.5/4 stars

Right Place, Wrong Time is a 1976 album by blues singer and guitarist Otis Rush. Although regarded as one of his finest recordings, the album was not issued until five years after it was recorded.

== Background ==
The music on this album was originally recorded in San Francisco in 1971 for Capitol Records, who declined to release it at the time. It was originally released on the independent Bullfrog label after Rush bought the tapes. In 1986 the rights were acquired by Hightone.

Eugene Chadbourne of AllMusic compares Capitol's decision not to release the album to a decision to turn down the Doors on the grounds that Jim Morrison had "no charisma", and says that "[o]ne can imagine the tapes practically smoldering in their cases, the music is so hot".

As well as a selection of blues numbers, the album includes a cover of Tony Joe White's "Rainy Night in Georgia".

== Track listing ==
Except where otherwise noted, tracks composed by Otis Rush

1. "Tore Up" (Ralph Bass, Ike Turner) - 3:17
2. "Right Place, Wrong Time" - 5:24
3. "Easy Go" - 4:41
4. "Three Times a Fool" - 3:11
5. "Rainy Night in Georgia" (Tony Joe White) - 3:55
6. "Natural Ball" (Albert King) - 3:30
7. "I Wonder Why" (Mel London) - 4:41
8. "Your Turn to Cry (Gil Caple, Deadric Malone) - 3:35
9. "Lonely Man" (Milton Campbell, Bob Lyons) - 2:50
10. "Take a Look Behind" - 5:40

== Personnel ==
Performance

- Fred Burton - guitar
- Bob Jones - drums
- John Kahn - bass
- Ira Kamin - organ
- Doug Kilmer - bass
- Hart McNee - alto saxophone
- Mark Naftalin - piano
- Otis Rush - vocals, guitar
- Ron Stallings - tenor saxophone
- John Wilmeth - trumpet

Production

- Nick Gravenites - producer
- Stephen Barncard - Engineer
- Amy O'Neal - photography
- Otis Rush - producer
- Dick Shurman - liner notes
