= Jeff Todd Titon =

American ethnomusicologist (born 1943)

Jeff Todd Titon (born 1943) is a professor emeritus of music at Brown University.

Titon holds a B.A. (1965) from Amherst College, an M.A. (in English, 1970) and a Ph.D. (in American Studies, 1971) from the University of Minnesota. He taught American literature, folklore and ethnomusicology in the departments of English and Music at Tufts University (1971-1986), where he co-founded both the American Studies program and the M.A. program in Ethnomusicology. He taught at Brown University (1986–2013) where he was director of the Ph.D. program in Ethnomusicology. He held visiting professorships at Amherst College, Carleton College, Berea College, East Tennessee State University and Indiana University's Folklore Institute.

== Works ==
His published books include Early Downhome Blues: A Musical and Cultural Analysis (University of Illinois Press, 1977; 2nd edition, University of North Carolina Press, 1994), Powerhouse for God: Speech, Chant and Song in an Appalachian Baptist Church (University of Texas Press, 1988; 2nd ed. University of Tennessee Press, 2018), Toward a Sound Ecology: New and Selected Essays (Indiana University Press, 2020). He is co-editor of the Oxford Handbook of Applied Ethnomusicology (Oxford University Press, 2015), Sounds, Ecologies, Musics (Oxford University Press, 2023) and general editor of Worlds of Music: An Introduction to the Music of the World's Peoples (Cengage/Schirmer Books, 6th ed., 2016). He was editor of Ethnomusicology, the journal of the Society for Ethnomusicology, from 1990-1995.

== Recognition ==
In 1998, he was elected a Fellow of the American Folklore Society, and in 2020, he received their Lifetime Scholarly Achievement Award.

In 2015, his field recordings were chosen for preservation in the National Recording Registry, Library of Congress.

== Academic Research ==
Titon is known for developing collaborative ethnographic research based on reciprocity and friendship, for helping to establish an applied ethnomusicology based in social responsibility, for proposing that music cultures can be understood as ecosystems, for introducing the concepts of musical and cultural sustainability, and for his appeal for a sound commons for all living creatures and his current ecomusicological project of a sound ecology. His definition of ethnomusicology as "the study of people making music"—making the sounds they call music, and making music as a cultural domain—is widely accepted within the field.

== Relevant literature ==
- Titon, Jeff Todd. 2020. Toward a Sound Ecology: New and Selected Essays. Indiana University Press. 324 pages. ISBN 978-0253049681 (hard cover).
