= Otis Rush =

American blues singer and guitarist (1934–2018)

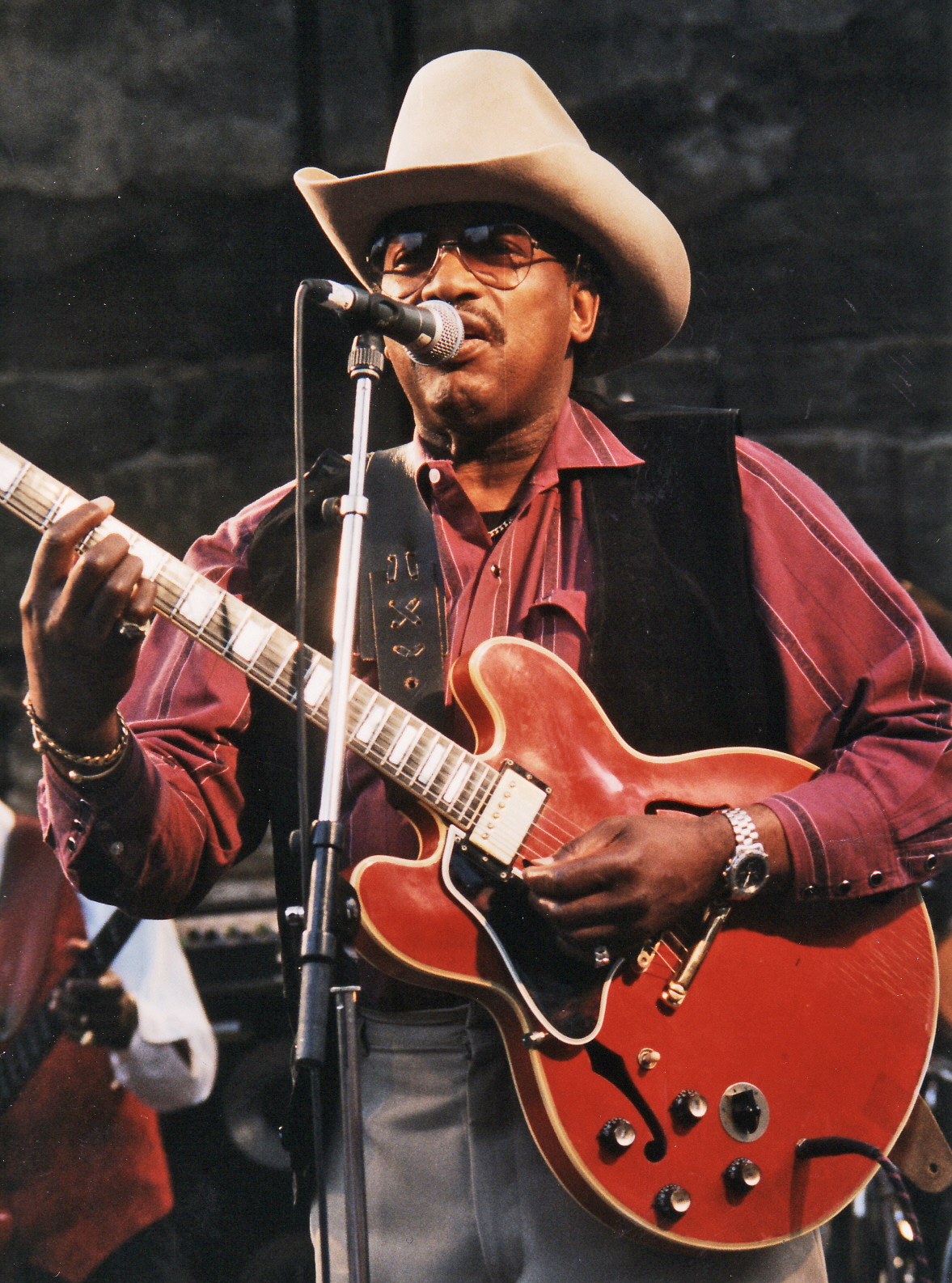
- Rush in 1997

Background information
- Also known as: Little Otis
- Born: Otis Rush Jr. April 29, 1934; Philadelphia, Mississippi, U.S.
- Died: September 29, 2018 (aged 84) Chicago, Illinois, U.S.
- Genres: Blues; Chicago blues; R&B
- Occupations: Musician; songwriter
- Instruments: Guitar; vocals
- Years active: 1949–2003
- Labels: Cobra; Chess; Duke; Vanguard; Cotillion; Bullfrog; Black & Blue; P-Vine; Delmark; Sonet; Blind Pig
- Website: www.otisrush.net

Otis Rush Jr. (April 29, 1934 – September 29, 2018) was an American blues guitarist and singer-songwriter. His distinctive guitar style featured a slow-burning sound and long bent notes. With qualities similar to the styles of other 1950s artists Magic Sam and Buddy Guy, his sound became known as West Side Chicago blues and was an influence on many musicians, including Michael Bloomfield, Peter Green and Eric Clapton.

Rush was left-handed and played as such; however, his guitars were strung with the low E string at the bottom, upside-down from typical guitarists. He often played with the little finger of his pick hand curled under the low E for positioning. It is widely believed that this contributed to his distinctive sound. He had a wide-ranging, powerful tenor voice.

== Early life ==
Otis Rush was born near Philadelphia, Mississippi, in 1934 during the Great Depression, the son of sharecroppers Julia Campbell Boyd and Otis C. Rush. He was one of seven children, and worked on the farm throughout his childhood. His mother regularly took him out of school, so he could add to the family income when the cotton was high and white landowners wanted extra labor.

Music was his solace. He sang in gospel choirs and taught himself to play guitar and harmonica, playing on street corners. "This is where my soul came from. This is where my faith started." He said of Neshoba County.

Determined not to spend his life in the cotton fields, he moved north to Chicago at the age of 14, working in stockyards and steel mills and driving a horse-drawn coal wagon, hanging out in the city's blues clubs at night.

== Career ==
Otis moved to Chicago, Illinois, in 1949 and, after being inspired by watching Muddy Waters, worked on his craft and made a name for himself playing in blues clubs on the South and West Sides of the city, initially using the name Little Otis. Willie Dixon caught his act and signed him to Cobra Records, a local independent label. From 1956 to 1958, with Dixon producing, Cobra recorded and released eight tracks, the songs that made him famous, including "Double Trouble", "All Your Love (I Miss Loving), and Three Times a Fool", some featuring Ike Turner or Jody Williams on guitar. Cobra and Otis' first single, "I Can't Quit You Baby", was a national hit in 1956, reaching number six on the Billboard R&B chart. It stayed on the chart for six weeks. Cash Box named his next release, "My Love Will Never Die", their Award of the Week and in a 1957 Cash Box poll, the nation's R&B disc jockeys voted him ihe Most Promising Up and Coming Male Vocalist.

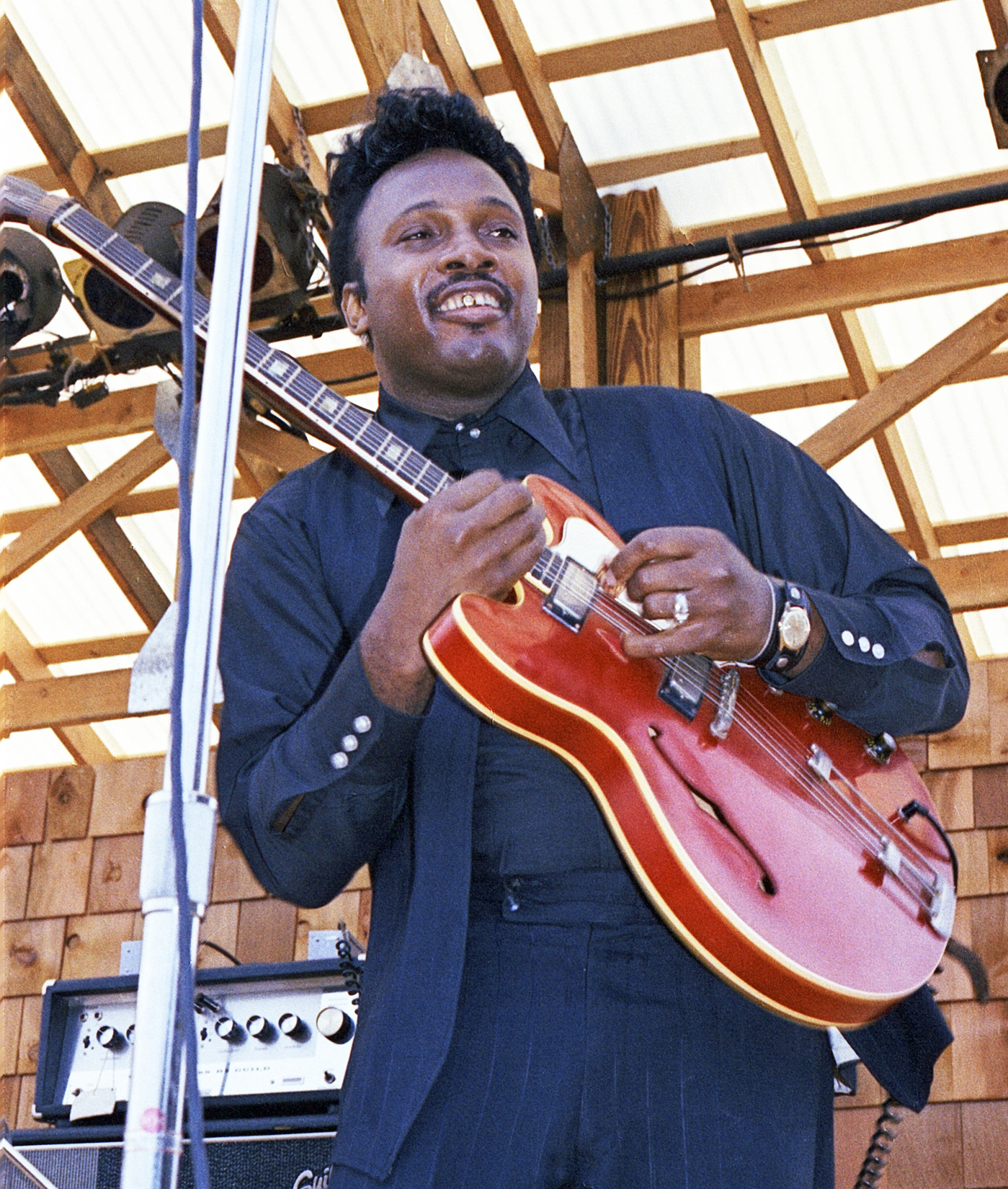
Otis Rush performs at the 1970 Ann Arbor Blues Festival, Ann Arbor, Michigan.

Now, as a popular act in Chicago's clubs, he toured nationally as part of R&B and rock and roll package shows with Little Richard, Buddy Holly and The Crickets, and Carl Perkins and The Drifters, playing at top venues such as the Apollo in New York City. He got tired of touring and went back to Chicago, playing clubs again and drawing good crowds, though for the most part, his Cobra sides did not chart nationally despite their excellence.

On his recommendation, Cobra recorded Magic Sam in 1957 and Buddy Guy in ’58 with Otis playing rhythm guitar on Buddy's first Chicago recording. In 1959, Cobra went bankrupt. Rush followed Dixon to Chess Records and signed a recording contract with them in 1960. He recorded eight tracks for the label, though they only released four, two singles, including the blistering, emotion drenched classic, "So Many Roads". Chess eventually released all eight tracks on the album Door to Door in 1969, a compilation that included their Albert King recordings. Unhappy with Chess' tightfisted control, he signed with Duke Records. While Chess didn't do much for him, Duke did less. They recorded him in only one four song session and issued only one single, "Homework" backed with "I Have to Laugh" which Vocalion released in the UK in 1963, his first overseas release.

In 1965, he recorded five tracks for a Sam Charters' project, Chicago/The Blues/Today! for Vanguard, including a fine version of "I Can't Quit You, Baby" and his haunting version of B.B. King's slow blues, "It's My Own Fault". These recordings are included on the label's compilation album Chicago/The Blues/Today! Vol. 2 which introduced him to new, white audiences. Rush began playing in other cities in the United States and Europe during the 1960s, earning a place with the American Folk Blues Festival touring Europe and securing several years of bookings at the Ann Arbor Blues festival. In 1967, Unofficial recordings from the 1966 University of Chicago Folkfest were released together with recordings by Little Walter. In 1969, Cotillion Records, an Atlantic Records subsidiary, released his first full album, Mourning in the Morning. Michael Bloomfield and Nick Gravenites, then with the band Electric Flag, recorded and produced the album at the FAME Studios in Muscle Shoals, Alabama. They incorporated soul music and rock, something new for Rush. Many critics panned the album, but it has since developed a cult following. In a Living Blues article by Jim O'Neil, its co-founder, Otis' friend, blues historian and producer, Dick Sherman said, "Neither the road nor the studio agreed with him' and sometimes the tension around a new release and touring seemed to make things worse."

"Rush is a 'good singer' with a 'good instrument'—sweet, penetrating, slurred—but the words aren't where his soul goes. It goes into the form itself. Like B.B. King's, only less predictably by now, his solos expand upon the Chicago verities in almost jazzlike flights without ever transgressing against them."

— Christgau's Record Guide: Rock Albums of the Seventies (1981)

In 1971, Otis recorded the album Right Place, Wrong Time in San Francisco for Capitol Records' though Capitol did not release it. He purchased the masters from them and through Dick Sherman's efforts, the album was finally issued five years later on P-Vine Records in Japan and on Bullfrog Records in the United States soon after. The album has since gained a reputation as some of his best work.

The Chicago-based Delmark label released two albums, including his inspired So Many Roads - Live in Concert recorded in Japan, where he has a huge following. Live performances of the blues were a new and rare event in Japan when Otis went there in 1975. The album was popular with critics and the public, and is one of his best, but the blues industry came upon hard times in the late '70's due to disco's huge popularity, and recording a blues record became difficult. Despite that, he was able to tour overseas and make some recordings for European labels, most of which are now available stateside, though he was unable to release any new material in America for a number of years. By the end of the decade, he refused to tour, and he had stopped performing and recording.

He made a comeback in 1985 with a U.S. tour and the release of a live album, Tops, recorded with a tight West Coast band at the San Francisco Blues Festival to favorable reviews. The following year, he performed with Eric Clapton at the Montreux Jazz Festival.

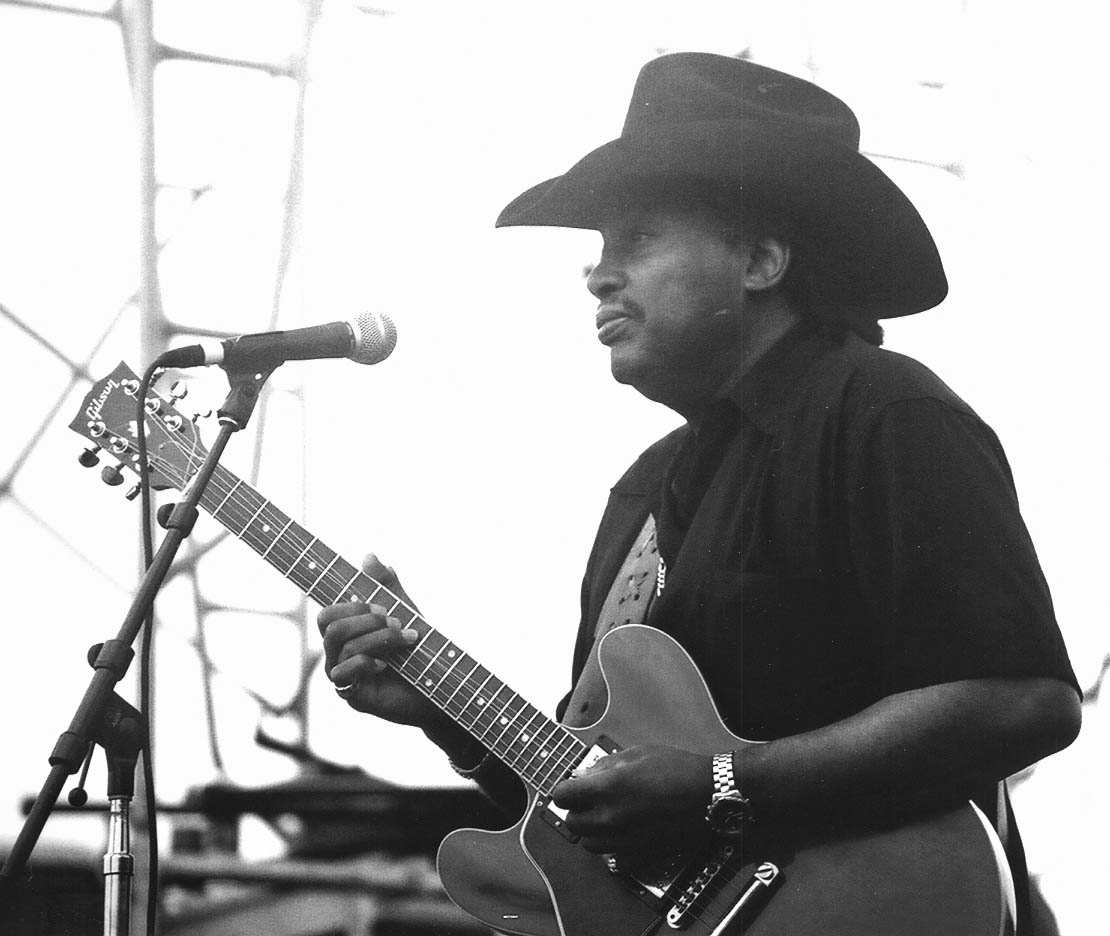
Rush performing in 2002

In 1994, Mercury released Ain't Enough Comin' In using the same production team and core musicians featured on Buddy Guy's Feels Like Rain album. It was his first studio album in 16 years, introducing him to a new generation of fans and topping many blues critics' year-end lists. The next year, he opened for Pearl Jam at Chicago's Soldier Field, and his album Any Place I'm Goin' in 1998 earned him a Grammy Award for Best Traditional Blues Album.

Despite his popularity overseas and the release of his European studio recordings in the U.S., he declined or missed bigger opportunities. He turned down an invitation from the Rolling Stones to record and tour with them. He backed away from Johnny Winter's offer of potentially reviving his career, as he did for Muddy Waters, by producing a record for him on Winters' Blue Sky label, and recording with Carlos Santana, who adored him, never worked out. He did not record a new studio album after 1998, though he continued touring and performing until 2003, when he suffered a stroke.

In 2002, he was featured on the Bo Diddley tribute album Hey Bo Diddley – A Tribute!, which Carla Olson produced, performing the song "I'm a Man." In the 2005 movie, Devil's Rejects, he performs "I Can't Quit You Baby" from the 1962 American Folk Blues Festival. The director of the film, Rob Zombie, an Otis fan, used the original Cobra recording for the soundtrack. His next album Live and in Concert from San Francisco from 1999 was released by Blues Express Records in 2006 . Video footage of the same show was released on the DVD Live Part 1 in 2003.

The Chicago Blues Festival was held in Grant Park in June 2016, and during the festival, Chicago Mayor Rahm Emanuel celebrated Rush for his “lifetime of genius” and named June 12 as Otis Rush Day. However, Rush could not attend the festival due to some health issues and he came with his family members. The occasion consisted of the video clips from his single “I Can’t Quit You Baby” of 1956 and also some tributes from Carlos Santana, Steve Miller, and Buddy Guy. Another tribute was organized consisting of the performance of Rush’s songs by Lurie Bell, Jimmy Johnson, Ronnie Earl and the Broadcasters, and Eddy Clearwater; Otis Clay was also supposed to perform but he died earlier that year.

"He was one of the last great blues guitar heroes. He was an electric god," Gregg Parker, CEO and a founder of the Chicago Blues Museum said of Otis. Writing in The New York Times, Bill Friskics-Warren acknowledged that Otis was "A richly emotive singer and a guitarist of great skill and imagination, Mr. Rush was in the vanguard of a small circle of late 1950s innovators, including Buddy Guy and Magic Sam, whose music, steeped in R&B, heralded a new era of Chicago blues."

== Awards ==
1978 Nominee Grammy Best Ethnic or Traditional Recording - "Right Place, Wrong Time

1980 Grammy Nominee Best Ethnic or Traditional Recording - "So Many Roads."

1995 Grammy Nominee for Best Traditional Blues Album - "Ain't Enough Comin' In

1999 Grammy Winner Best Traditional Blues Album - "Any Place I'm Going."

Otis Rush elected to the Blues Hall of Fame in 1984.

In 2007, the Mississippi Blues Commission erected the Otis Rush marker on the Mississippi Blues Trail in Philadelphia, Mississippi at the old train depot (Welcome Center) on West Beacon Street, State Route 21, where he boarded a northbound train in 1948.

In 2015, Rolling Stone ranked him number 53 on its 100 Greatest Guitarists list.

The Jazz Foundation of America honored Rush with a Lifetime Achievement Award on April 20, 2018 "for a lifetime of genius and leaving an indelible mark in the world of blues and the universal language of music."

== Death ==
Otis Rush died on September 29, 2018, from complications of a stroke. He was 84 years old. His wife, Masaki, announced his death on his website. A celebration in his honor was held at Space in Evanston, Illinois, on April 24, 2019.

== Selected discography ==
In depth, illustrated discography - https://www.wirz.de/music/rushotis.htm

=== Albums ===
- 1969 Mourning in the Morning (Cotillion)
- 1975 Screamin' and Cryin' (Black & Blue)
- 1975 Cold Day in Hell (Delmark)
- 1976 Right Place, Wrong Time (Bullfrog)
- 1978 Troubles Troubles (Sonet)
- 1991 Lost in the Blues (Alligator ALCD4797)
- 1994 Ain't Enough Comin' In (This Way Up/Mercury)
- 1998 Any Place I'm Going (House of Blues)

=== Live albums ===
- 1976 So Many Roads (Delmark)
- 1976 All Your Love I Miss Loving: Live at the Wise Fools Pub, Chicago (, Delmark, released, 2005)
- 1988 Tops (Blind Pig)
- 1989 Blues Interaction – Live in Japan 1986 (P-Vine)
- 1993 Live in Europe (Evidence Music ECD 26034–2)
- 2006 Live at Montreux 1986 (Eagle Rock Entertainment) (joint performance with Eric Clapton and Luther Allison)
- 2006 Live...and in Concert from San Francisco (Blues Express)
- 2009 Chicago Blues Festival 2001 (P-Vine)
- 2015 Double Trouble LIVE Cambridge 1973 (RockBeat Records)

=== Compilation albums ===
- 1965 Chicago/The Blues/Today! Vol. 2 (Vanguard)
- 1968 This One's a Good One (Blue Horizon)
- 1969 Door to Door, with Albert King (Chess)
- 1972 Blues Masters, Vol. 2
- 1989 I Can't Quit You Baby: The Cobra Sessions 1956–1958 (P-Vine)
- 2000 Good 'Uns: The Classic Cobra Recordings 1956–1958 (Westside)
- 2000 The Essential Otis Rush: The Classic Cobra Recordings 1956–1958 (Fuel 2000)
- 2002 Blue on Blues: Buddy Guy & Otis Rush (Fuel 2000)

=== Singles ===
- 1956 "I Can't Quit You Baby" / "Sit Down Baby" (Cobra 5000)
- 1956 "My Love Will Never Die" / "Violent Love" (Cobra 5005)
- 1957 "Groaning the Blues" / "If You Were Mine" (Cobra 5010)
- 1957 "Jump Sister Bessie" / "Love That Woman" (Cobra 5015)
- 1957 "She's a Good 'Un" / "Three Times a Fool" (Cobra 5023)
- 1958 "Checking on My Baby" / "It Takes Time" (Cobra 5027)
- 1958 "Double Trouble" / "Keep On Loving Me Baby" (Cobra 5030)
- 1958 "All Your Love (I Miss Loving)" / "My Baby's a Good 'Un" (Cobra 5032)
- 1960 "So Many Roads So Many Trains" / "I'm Satisfied" (Chess 1751)
- 1960 "You Know My Love" / "I Can't Stop Baby" (Chess 1775)
- 1962 "Homework" / "I Have to Laugh" (Duke 356 and Vocalion VP 92600
- 1969 "Gambler's Blues" / "You're Killing My Love" (Cotillion 44032)

=== DVDs ===
- 2003 Live Part One (Blues Express)
- 2006 Live at Montreux 1986 (Eagle Rock Entertainment)
