= All Your Love (I Miss Loving) =

1958 blues standard by Otis Rush

Single by Otis Rush
- B-side: "My Baby's a Good 'Un"
- Released: 1959
- Recorded: 1958
- Studio: Cobra, Chicago
- Genre: Blues
- Length: 2:36
- Label: Cobra
- Songwriter(s): Otis Rush
- Producer(s): Willie Dixon

Otis Rush singles chronology
"Double Trouble" (1959)	"All Your Love (I Miss Loving)" (1959)	"So Many Roads So Many Trains" (1960)

"All Your Love (I Miss Loving)" or "All Your Love" is a blues standard written and recorded by Chicago blues guitarist Otis Rush in 1958. Of all of his compositions, it is the best-known with versions by several blues and other artists. "All Your Love" was inspired by an earlier blues song and later influenced other popular songs.

== Composition and recording ==
"All Your Love" is a moderate-tempo minor-key twelve-bar blues with Afro-Cuban rhythmic influences. An impromptu song "apparently dashed off ... in the car en route to Cobra's West Roosevelt Road studios", it borrows guitar lines and the arrangement from "Lucky Lou", a 1957 instrumental single by blues guitarist Jody Williams. The song alternates between guitar and vocal sections, with an instrumental bridge performed as a faster-tempo twelve-bar shuffle featuring Rush's guitar solo.

The song was produced by Willie Dixon and features Rush on guitar and vocal, Dixon on bass, Ike Turner on second guitar, Little Brother Montgomery on piano, Harold Ashby and Jackie Brenston on saxophones, and Billy Gayles on drums. When "All Your Love" was released in 1958 on Cobra Records, it was Rush's last single for the label. Rush subsequently recorded several studio and live versions of the song, including one released on his Blues Interaction – Live in Japan 1986 album.

== Recognition and influence ==
In 2010, Otis Rush's "All Your Love (I Miss Loving)" was inducted into the Blues Foundation Hall of Fame, which noted that Rush's song "was the obvious inspiration for Bob Dylan's recent track "Beyond Here Lies Nothin'"". In various interviews, Peter Green acknowledged being influenced by "All Your Love"' when he wrote the rock classic "Black Magic Woman", that became a major hit for Santana. According to Carlos Santana, "If you take the words from 'Black Magic Woman' and just leave the rhythm, it's 'All Your Love'—it's Otis Rush". A variety of musical artists have recorded the song, often as "All Your Love", although that is also the title of a different song by Magic Sam.
