= Why I Sing the Blues =

Compilation album by B. B. King
- Released: 1983
- Genre: Blues
- Length: 58:31
- Label: MCA

B. B. King chronology
Love Me Tender (1982)	Why I Sing the Blues (1983)	Six Silver Strings (1985)

Professional ratings
Review scores
Source	Rating
AllMusic	2.5/5 stars

Why I Sing the Blues is a 1983 album by the blues guitarist and singer B.B. King. Originally made by MCA Records as a bargain-bin greatest hits compilation, the album is a showcase of King's best work from the late 1960s and early 1970s. The album was released in CD format in 1992.

== Track listing ==
1. "The Thrill Is Gone" (Roy Hawkins, Rick Darnell) - 5:24
2. "Ghetto Woman" (Riley King, Clark) - 5:14
3. "Why I Sing the Blues" (Riley King, Clark) - 8:38
4. "Ain't Nobody Home" (Jerry Ragovoy) - 3:34
5. "Hummingbird" (Leon Russell) - 4:32
6. "To Know You Is to Love You" (Stevie Wonder, Syreeta Wright) - 8:31
7. "How Blue Can You Get?" (Jane Feather, Leonard Feather) - 5:08
8. "Sweet Sixteen" (Doc Pomus) - 7:01
9. "So Excited" (Jerry Jemmott, Riley King) - 5:34
10. "Chains and Things" (with Carole King) (Riley King, Clark) - 4:55
