= Double Trouble (Otis Rush song) =

1958 song by Otis Rush

Single by Otis Rush
- B-side: "Keep On Loving Me Baby"
- Released: February 1959
- Recorded: 1958
- Studio: Cobra, Chicago
- Genre: Blues
- Length: 2:42
- Label: Cobra
- Songwriter: Otis Rush
- Producer: Willie Dixon

Otis Rush singles chronology
"It Takes Time" (1958)	"Double Trouble" (1959)	"All Your Love (I Miss Loving)" (1959)

"Double Trouble" is a blues song written and recorded by Chicago blues guitarist Otis Rush in 1958. Since its release as a single in 1959, the song has been recorded by several blues and other artists, including several versions by Eric Clapton. Stevie Ray Vaughan named his band "Double Trouble" after Rush's song. In 2008, Rush's original version was inducted into the Blues Foundation Hall of Fame, who called it a "minor-key masterpiece".

== Original song ==
"Double Trouble" is a slow tempo twelve-bar blues notated in 4/4 time in the key of D minor. According to biographer Don Snowden, "The song's underlying air of quiet desperation stretched to the breaking point is enhanced by brilliant use of dynamics and some truly mind-boggling, strangled guitar fills near the end." According to Otis Rush, the song's title was inspired by a comment by a woman upon viewing her hand during a card game "trouble, trouble, trouble, trouble, double troubles".

You laughed at me walkin' baby, when I had no place to go
Bad luck and trouble have taken me, I have got no money to show
Hey, hey, to make it you got to try, baby that's no lie

The song was produced by Willie Dixon and features Rush on guitar and vocal, Dixon on bass, Ike Turner on second guitar, Little Brother Montgomery on piano, Harold Ashby and Jackie Brenston on saxophones, and Billy Gayles on drums. Although Rush plays the lead guitar introduction to the song, Turner plays the signature vibrato guitar parts. In 1986, Rush recorded a live version of the song for Blues Interaction – Live in Japan 1986, which was released in 1989.
