= Blues Interaction – Live in Japan 1986 =

1986 live album by Otis Rush

Blues Interaction - Live In Japan 1986

Live album by Otis Rush
- Released: 1989
- Recorded: December 1986, Tokyo, Japan
- Genre: Blues
- Length: 63:53
- Label: P-Vine

Blues Interaction – Live in Japan 1986 is an album by blues singer and guitarist Otis Rush, recorded live in Tokyo in December 1986. Recorded with Break Down, a local Japanese band, it features tunes originally popularized by Rush and other blues and R&B artists.

== Critical reception ==
Professional ratings
Review scores
Source	Rating
AllMusic	2.5/5 stars

In a review for AllMusic, Rev. Keith A. Gordon gave the album 2 1/2 out of five stars and considered Rush's compositions "Tops", "All Your Love" and "Double Trouble" as the album's highlights. However, he concluded, "The inconsistency of Rush's performance and the mediocre skills of the backing band make Live in Japan 1986 a mixed bag appealing mostly to blues completists and Rush fanatics."

== Track listing ==
All tracks are written by Otis Rush, except where noted.

1. "Tops" – 7:22
2. "All Your Love (I Miss Loving)" – 5:48
3. "Please, Please, Please" (James Brown, Johnny Terry) – 4:51
4. "Killing Floor" (Chester Burnett a.k.a. Howlin' Wolf) – 8:43
5. "Stand By Me" (Ben E. King, Jerry Leiber and Mike Stoller) – 5:36
6. "Lonely Man" (Milton Campbell, Bob Lyons) – 2:50
7. "Double Trouble" – 4:11
8. "Right Place, Wrong Time" – 7:19
9. "Got My Mojo Working" (Preston Foster) – 6:30
10. "Gambler's Blues" (B.B. King, Jules Taub) – 10:03
