= Jim O'Neal =

American record producer

Jim O'Neal (born November 25, 1948, Fort Wayne, Indiana, United States) is an American blues expert, writer, record producer, and record company executive. He co-founded America's first blues magazine, Living Blues, in Chicago in 1970, and wrote the column "BluEsoterica". O'Neal also co-founded Rooster Blues Records and, as of 2007, operated the Stackhouse record label, with bases in Clarksdale, Mississippi, and Kansas City.

O'Neal produced Lonnie Shields' debut album, Portrait, on Rooster Blues in 1993, which achieved notable critical acclaim, being cited as one of the best debut albums of that year. In addition, Portrait won the Living Blues Critics' Poll as Best Album.

He is co-editor with Amy van Singel of the book, The Voice of the Blues: Classic Interviews from Living Blues Magazine (Routledge, 2002, ISBN 978-0415936545).

O'Neal was inducted into the Blues Hall of Fame in 2002.
