= Charles Mann (songwriter) =

American musician (1949–1991)

- Born: Charles M. Mann; December 29, 1949; Atlanta, Georgia, U.S.
- Died: April 24, 1991 (aged 41) Atlanta, Georgia, U.S.
- Genres: R&B, soul
- Occupations: Singer, songwriter, musician, record producer
- Labels: ABC Records, LA Records

Charles M. Mann (December 29, 1949 – April 24, 1991) was an American R&B songwriter, soul singer, record producer and musician. He worked during the 1970s into the Philly Sound world. He should not be confused with the swamp pop singer Charles Mann, born in 1944. (Note: Several websites dedicated to music confuse these two people or their date of birth.)

== Life and career ==
Charles M. Mann was born on December 29, 1949, in Atlanta, Georgia. He built up a reputation as a writer and performer in the Atlanta area, which allowed him to be spotted by Jay Lasker, then president of ABC Records, who signed him for the label at the beginning of 1973.

As a songwriter, often in partnership with Dave Crawford, he wrote and composed for artists such as B.B. King, The Mighty Clouds of Joy and Nature's Gift. He obtained five hits in the R&B Top 100, including one hit in the Top 10 (I Like to Live the Love by B.B. King in 1973).

As a solo singer, he had a minor hit in 1973 with the song '"It's All Over", a track from his Philadelphia-recorded album Say You Love Me Too. Produced by Dave Crawford, the title track reached #36 on the Billboard R&B chart.

From 1977, he worked as a writer, arranger and producer for two labels owned by a company based in Chapel Hill, North Carolina, which had to stop its activities in 1980 for illegally marketing bootleg recordings.

He later signed for Crawford's own small Los Angeles based label, LA Records and released "Shonuff No Funny Stuff Love", in 1981.

Charles M. Mann died on April 24, 1991, in Atlanta (Fulton County), Georgia.

== Discography ==
=== Performer (as Charles Mann) ===
==== Singles ====
- 1973 : "Do It Again" / "It's All Over"
- 1973 : "Say You Love Me Too" / "I Can Feel It" (ABC 13347)
- 1973 : "It's All Over" / "Very Lonely" (ABC 11384)
- 1974 : "Got To Let You Know" / "Loving You Is Changing Me" (ABC 11434)
- 1981 : "Shonuff No Funny Stuff Love" / "Shonuff No Funny Stuff Love (instrumental)" (LA Records LA 0070 7)

==== Albums ====
- 1973 : Say You Love Me Too (ABC Records ABCX 786)
- 1989 : High Qualities (Mann Recording Company MRC-LP 101)

=== Producer (as Charles M. Mann) ===
- 1977 : The Original Marauders - "Now Your Mouth Cries Wolf - A Tribute To Bob Dylan" (LP, Pied Piper Records 7902)
- 1977 : Blue Heaven - "After The Deluge - A Tribute To Jackson Browne" (LP, Pied Piper Records 7905)
- 1977 : The Great Imposters - "Dollars In Drag - A Tribute To David Bowie" (LP, Pied Piper Records 7907)
- 1977 : The Great Imposters - "20/20 Hindsight - A Tribute To Nazz" (LP, Pied Piper Records 7908)
- 1978 : The Blazers - "Store Bought" (LP, Cream Of The Crop Records 7956)
- 1979 : Robert, Rory and Ricky (LP, Cream Of The Crop Records 7957)
