= Blues Unlimited =

UK magazine

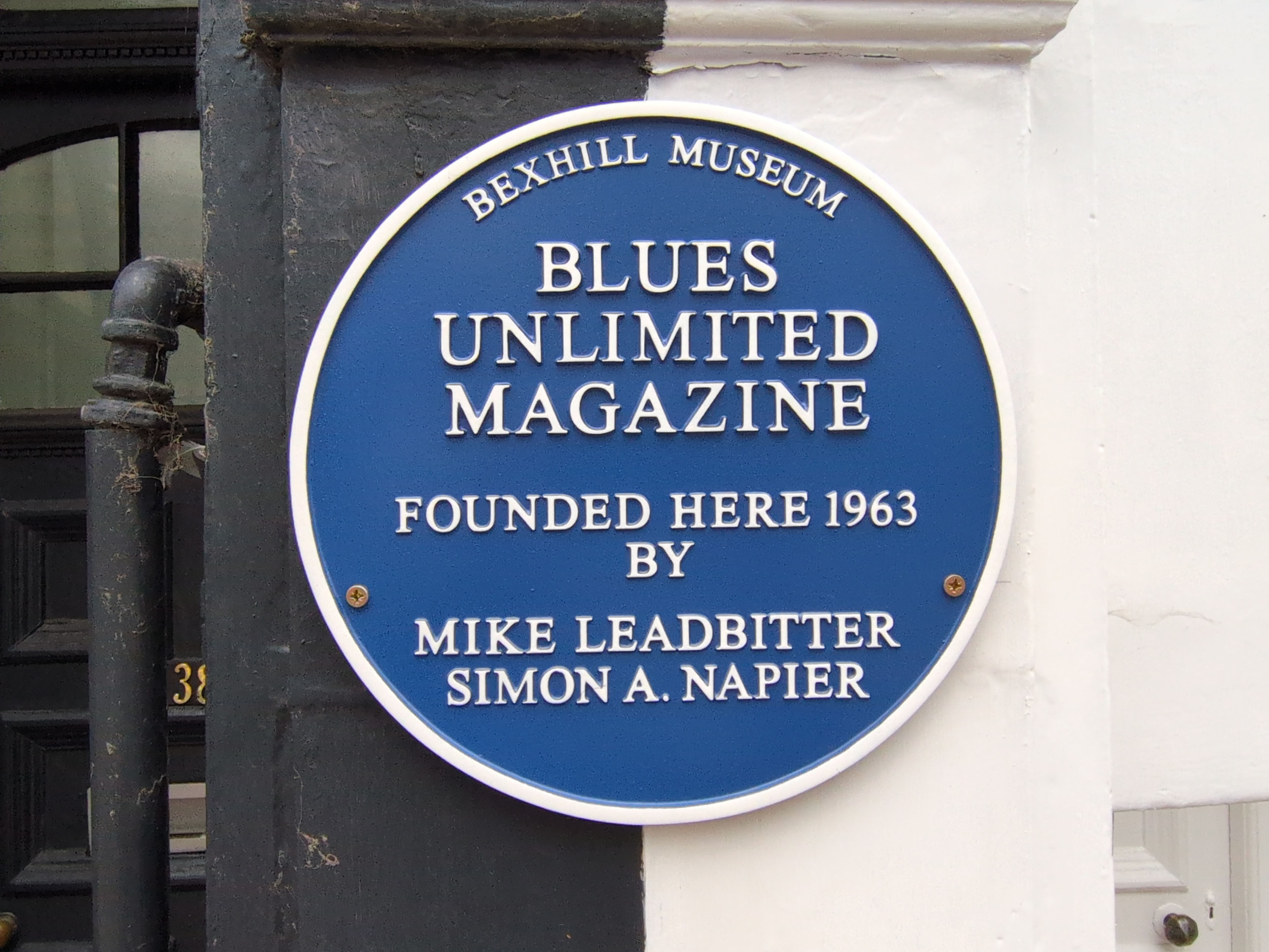
Plaque commemorating the founding of the magazine in Bexhill-on-Sea.

Blues Unlimited (ISSN 0006-5153) was a British monthly music magazine dealing with all aspects of blues music. Co-founded in 1963 by Simon A. Napier (not to be confused with Simon Napier-Bell) and Mike Leadbitter, it was - along with its later American counterpart Living Blues - considered one of the premier magazines for blues music. It adopted the name of an earlier magazine published by Max Vreede in the Netherlands, which had ceased publication.

The magazine launched in April 1963 as a typed, mimeographed pamphlet; its last issue (#148/149), by then a full-fledged photo-offset production, was published in the winter of 1987 and edited by Mike Rowe.
