= Dave Crawford (musician) =

American musician and producer (1943–1988)

David Bernard Crawford (October 24, 1943 – June 1988) was an American R&B musician, songwriter, radio personality and record producer. He wrote "What a Man", originally recorded by Linda Lyndell and later reinterpreted by Salt-n-Pepa; "Precious, Precious", a hit for Jackie Moore; and "Young Hearts Run Free", an international hit for Candi Staton.

== Life and career ==
He was born in Jacksonville, Florida, and learned piano as a child. As a teenager, he performed with gospel musicians including Albertina Walker, Shirley Caesar, and The Caravans. He later became a disc jockey at radio station WOBS in Jacksonville, where he was known as "The Demon", before moving on to station WTMP in Tampa. His first success as a songwriter came with "What a Man", a minor R&B chart hit in 1968 for Linda Lyndell. The song was interpolated by Salt-n-Pepa in 1993 and re-titled "Whatta Man", becoming a major hit.

In 1969, he and Brad Shapiro became staff producers at Atlantic Records, where they worked with Wilson Pickett and Dee Dee Warwick, and produced the debut album by The J. Geils Band. Crawford also co-wrote, with his cousin Jackie Moore, the song "Precious, Precious" which was recorded by Moore and reached the Billboard R&B and pop chart in 1970. He continued to work with Shapiro on Moore's subsequent records for Atlantic, and also worked as a producer with B. B. King, The Mighty Clouds of Joy, and Phyllis Hyman.

As a freelance producer in 1975, based in Atlanta, Georgia, he was paired with singer Candi Staton, and wrote "Young Hearts Run Free". According to Staton, the song's genesis was a conversation she had with Crawford over lunch in Los Angeles. Staton said: "Dave Crawford was always asking me: 'What's happening in your life?'...and I was [then] with someone I shouldn't have been with and it was hard getting out of that...very abusive relationship. [He said], 'You know, I’m gonna write you a song. I’m gonna write you a song that's gonna last forever.'"

Crawford set up his own label, L. A. Records, in Los Angeles in 1974. The label released several singles and an album, Here Am I, by Crawford as a solo performer, but neither they, nor other releases on the label by Judy Clay, Charles Mann and others, were successful. Crawford reportedly made substantial financial losses on the venture, and returned to Miami where he worked as a DJ on gospel radio.

He was murdered in Brooklyn, New York, in June 1988, and was buried there.
