= Sings Spirituals =

Studio album by B. B. King
- Released: 1960
- Recorded: 1959
- Genre: Blues, gospel
- Label: Crown

B. B. King chronology
The Blues (1958)	Sings Spirituals (1960)	My Kind of Blues (1961)

Professional ratings
Review scores
Source	Rating
AllMusic	3/5 stars

Sings Spirituals is the fifth studio album by B. B. King, released in 1960. He is backed by organ, piano, drums and bass, and accompanied vocally by two groups of Angeleno singers: the Charioteers and the Southern California Community Choir.

== Track listing ==
All songs are derived from traditional hymns, except where noted

No.	Title	Writer(s)	Length
1.	"Precious Lord"	Thomas A. Dorsey	3:24
2.	"Save a Seat for Me"	Archie Browniee	3:06
3.	"Ole Time Religion"		2:31
4.	"Sweet Chariot"		2:11
5.	"Servant's Prayer"	Thomas A. Dorsey	3:05
6.	"Jesus Gave Me Water"	Lucie E. Campbell	3:04
7.	"I Never Heard a Man"	Lloyd Woodard	2:39
8.	"Army of the Lord"	Stuart Hamblen	3:07
9.	"I Am Willing to Run All the Way"		3:40
10.	"I'm Working on the Building"	Lillian Bowles, Winifred Hoyle	2:47
Total length:			30:24

=== Bonus tracks ===
1. "A Lonely Lover's Plea" (Riley B. King, Jules Taub, Sam Ling)
2. "I Am" (Earl Shuman, Sherman Edwards)
3. "The Key to My Kingdom" (Claude Baum, Joe Josea, Maxwell Davis)
4. "Story from My Heart and Soul" (Riley B. King, Jules Taub)
5. "In the Middle of an Island" (Nick Acquaviva, Ted Varnick)
6. "Sixteen Tons" (Merle Travis)
7. "Precious Lord" (Thomas A. Dorsey)
8. "Swing Low, Sweet Chariot" (Traditional)
