= George Panos =

American record company executive

- Occupation: Record executive
- Years active: 1960s - ?
- Labels: Crown Records, Custom Records, Audiomasters, Cherry Red Records

George Panos was an American record company executive and record label founder and owner. He was based in Hollywood, California. Prior to starting his own label and co-founding another, he worked for the Bihari Brothers in various positions with their record labels.

== Background ==
Panos, a former navy veteran was sales manager for Crown Records for a period of seven years, and in 1967, he was the general manager sales chief. In 1968, Panos was promoted to the position of vice-president-general manager of the pressing division for the Crown and Custom labels, the subsidiaries of Kent / Modern Records in Los Angeles.

=== Audiomasters ===
Panos was owner and president of Audiomasters, which was located at 7053 1/2 Vineland Ave, North Hollywood, California 91605. The catalogue of Audiomasters was mainly on pre-recorded tape cassettes and eight tracks of the budget variety. Some of the releases included the Exploito type of budget albums such as Linda Richards Sings "Donna Summer" Favorites, and The Neil Diamond Sound "Sung By Johnny Richards". In addition to pre-recorded and blank cassettes, the company sold accessories such as revolving cassette racks and record stands. In 1974, he was at Majestic Hotel in Cannes, Italy, appearing at the MIDEM convention.

=== Cherry Red Records ===
Panos also co-owned Cherry Red Records with Morey Alexander. After leaving his position as National Sales Manager at Crown Records, Panos and Alexander formed Cherry Red Records. Their first release was The Dirty Dozens by Rudy Ray Moore. The headquarters for Cherry Red were located at the same address as the Audiomasters label.
