= Paul Sykes =

Paul Sykes may refer to:

- Paul Sykes (boxer) (1946–2007), English heavyweight boxer
- Paul Sykes (businessman) (born 1943), English Eurosceptic businessman and political donor
- Paul Sykes (rugby league) (born 1981), English rugby league footballer
- Paul Sykes (singer) (1937–1994), American folksinger
- Paul Sykes, English non-league footballer who died while playing
- Paul Sykes, former member of The Yogscast
