= My Kind of Blues =

My Kind of Blues may refer to:

- My Kind of Blues (B.B. King album), 1961
- My Kind of Blues (Sam Cooke album), 1961
