= 16 Lovin' Ounces to the Pound =

Single by Don Lee
- B-side: "All I Ever Wanted Was You (Here Lovin' Me)"
- Released: November 12, 1979
- Genre: Country
- Label: Crescent 103
- Songwriter(s): D. Lee, B. Duncan, B.R. Jones, J. R. Halper

Don Lee singles chronology
"I'm in Love with a Memory" (1981)	"16 Lovin' Ounces to the Pound" (1979)

"16 Lovin' Ounces to the Pound" is a song co-written and recorded by Don Lee. It was a hit on the US country charts in 1982.

== Background ==
By July 1982, "16 Lovin' Ounces to the Pound" was released on Crescent 103. It was produced by Lee and co-written along with B. Duncan, B. R. Jones and J. R. Halper. Lee had previously made the Cash Box Top 100 Country Singles chart that year with the single, "I'm in Love with a Memory".

== Chart performance ==
=== Billboard ===
The single stayed on the Billboard country chart for a total of three weeks, reaching a peak position of 86 on September 18, 1982.

=== Cash Box ===
On September 25, 1982, the single had been on the Cash Box Top 100 Country Singles chart for five weeks, moving to No. 66 on the chart.
