= Jimmy Beasley =

American rhythm and blues musician (born 1931)

- Born: September 30, 1931 (age 94); Kansas City, Missouri
- Occupations: rhythm and blues musician
- Years active: 1954–1990s
- Known for: recorded under Peacock Records and Modern Records labels
- Notable work: "My Happiness" regional hit in 1956

James Edward Beasley (born September 30, 1931) is an American rhythm and blues singer, pianist and songwriter.

Born in Kansas City, Missouri, Beasley learned piano from Willie Rice, and was heavily influenced by Fats Domino. He was also a Golden Gloves winning amateur boxer, and sang in the Aces Quartet and the Sonny Kenner Trio. In 1954, he moved to Los Angeles, and joined King Perry's band, with whom he recorded for Hollywood Records. He also recorded under his own name for the Peacock and Modern labels, in a style similar to Fats Domino.

Although Beasley had no national chart hits, "Ella Jane", recorded with a band that included saxophonists Maxwell Davis and Plas Johnson, and guitarist Rene Hall, sold moderately well, and Beasley regularly played in Los Angeles clubs. Some of Beasley's recordings on Modern, including "Don't Feel Sorry for Me" and "Little Coquette" were recorded in New Orleans in 1956 with Dave Bartholomew's band, and "Little Coquette" was later recorded by Fats Domino. Beasley also backed Etta James at recording sessions in New Orleans.

After having a moderate regional hit with "My Happiness" in 1956, Beasley formed his own band and moved to New York City, where he worked for Alan Freed, performed alongside Ray Charles, Elvis Presley and Ruth Brown, appeared on numerous TV shows, and continued to write for Fats Domino and others. He continued to record for Modern and its subsidiary Crown label, who released an LP, Jimmy's House Party, which was repackaged in 1961 with a slightly different track listing as Twist with Jimmy Beasley. His last recordings, "Ready To Go" / "My Baby's Gone", were released in 1965. His records were among those that influenced the development of ska music in Jamaica.

In the 1970s, Beasley appeared in cabaret in Reno and Las Vegas, and regularly in Laughlin, Nevada. He then moved to Torrance, California, where he owned a club and continued to perform occasionally. He also appeared at blues festivals in Europe in the 1990s, but retired from performing after a stroke in the late 1990s.
