= Little Band Big Jazz =

Studio album by Conte Candoli All Stars
- Released: 1960
- Recorded: February 3, 1960
- Studio: Hollywood, California
- Genre: Jazz
- Length: 28:42
- Label: Crown; CLP 5162/CST 190
- Producer: Red Clyde

Conte Candoli chronology
Mucho Calor (1957)	Little Band Big Jazz (1960)	Conversation (1973)

Alternate cover
- 1964 reissue as Vince Guaraldi and the Conte Candoli All-Stars

Little Band Big Jazz is an album by trumpeter Conte Candoli's All Stars recorded in 1960 and released on Crown Records.

Following the success of pianist Vince Guaraldi's album, Jazz Impressions of Black Orpheus (1962), Crown reissued Little Band Big Jazz as Vince Guaraldi and the Conte Candoli All-Stars in 1964. New cover art featured a painting of Guaraldi in place of the group photo used on the original release.

== Reception ==
Professional ratings
Review scores
Source	Rating
AllMusic	3.5/5 stars
Five Cents Please	3/5 stars

AllMusic critic Scott Yanow noted: "While the solos are excellent, trumpeter Conte Candoli's six originals (two co-written with pianist Vince Guaraldi) are not particularly memorable. Their chord structures are comfortable for the musicians but none of the melodies will be remembered". Guaraldi biographer and historian Derrick Bang commented, "All in all, this is an engaging album, if in the old Big Band style."

== Track listing ==
All tracks are written by Conte Candoli, except where noted.

Side One
No.	Title	Length
1.	"Muggin' the Minor"	4:04
2.	"Mambo Diane"	4:58
3.	"Countin' the Blues"	5:02

Side Two
No.	Title	Writer(s)	Length
4.	"Zizanie"		3:58
5.	"Macedonia"	Conte Candoli, Vince Guaraldi	5:08
6.	"Little David"	Conte Candoli, Vince Guaraldi	5:32
Total length:			28:42

== Personnel ==
- Conte Candoli – trumpet
- Buddy Collette – tenor saxophone
- Vince Guaraldi – piano
- Leroy Vinnegar – double bass
- Stan Levey – drums
