= Coleman Hawkins and His Orchestra =

Studio album by Coleman Hawkins
- Released: 1960
- Recorded: 1960
- Studio: NYC
- Genre: Jazz
- Label: Crown; CLP-5181/CST-206
- Producer: Cannonball Adderley

Coleman Hawkins chronology
At Ease with Coleman Hawkins (1960)	Coleman Hawkins and His Orchestra (1960)	The Hawk Swings (1960)

Coleman Hawkins and His Orchestra is an album by saxophonist Coleman Hawkins which was recorded in 1960 and released on the Crown label.

Professional ratings
Review scores
Source	Rating
AllMusic	3/5 stars

== Track listing ==
All compositions by Coleman Hawkins

1. "Bean in Orbit" – 6:08
2. "After Midnight" – 4:51
3. "Hassle" – 6:41
4. "Moodsville" – 6:21
5. "Stalking" – 9:20

== Personnel ==
- Coleman Hawkins – tenor saxophone
- Thad Jones – trumpet
- Eddie Costa – piano, vibraphone
- George Duvivier – bass
- Osie Johnson – drums
