= The Hawk Swings =

Studio album by Coleman Hawkins
- Released: 1961
- Recorded: 1960
- Studio: NYC
- Genre: Jazz
- Length: 31:33
- Label: Crown; CLP-5207/CST-224

Coleman Hawkins chronology
Coleman Hawkins and His Orchestra (1960)	The Hawk Swings (1961)	Night Hawk (1960)

The Hawk Swings is an album by saxophonist Coleman Hawkins which was recorded in 1960 and released on the Crown label.

== Reception ==
Professional ratings
Review scores
Source	Rating
AllMusic	3.5/5 stars

Matt Collar of AllMusic states, "the album is a great example of the Hawk's swinging, mainstream jazz style and shows how vital the swing-era style remained well into the modern jazz era".

== Track listing ==
All compositions by Coleman Hawkins

1. "Cloudy" – 5:36
2. "Almost Dawn" – 8:56
3. "Stake Out" – 6:15
4. "Cross Town" – 5:04
5. "Shadows" – 5:42

== Personnel ==
- Coleman Hawkins – tenor saxophone
- Thad Jones – trumpet
- Eddie Costa – piano, vibraphone
- George Duvivier – bass
- Osie Johnson – drums
