= Jesus Is the Same in California =

1976 song by Lloyd Goodson

Single by Lloyd Goodson
- B-side: "Wearin' Out the Patches on My Knee"
- Released: 1976
- Genre: Country
- Length: 3:10 (intro :06)
- Label: United Artists UA-XW891-Y
- Songwriter(s): (Lloyd Goodson/Don Lee)
- Producer(s): Larry Butler

Lloyd Goodson singles chronology
"Jesus Is the Same in California" (1976)	"Down Home Up Bringin" (1977)

"Jesus Is the Same in California" was a hit in 1976 for country singer Lloyd Goodson.

== Background ==
The song was co-written with Don Lee. It was backed with "Wishin' I Could Change The Kind Of Fool I've Been" which was also co-written with Lee. It was released on United Artists UA-XW891-Y. It was done in a similar style to a Merle Haggard song. It tells of a man in Folsom Prison who receives a letter from his mother who has faith that Jesus is there with him in California as he is there with her in Tennessee. The song does have a happy ending.

== Chart performance ==
The single spent six weeks on the US country singles chart, peaking at No. 80 on November 12, 1976. It also made the Cashbox charts that year and at one stage in the week ending December 25 it was at No. 16.
