= I'm in Love with a Memory =

Single by Don Lee
- B-side: "Cowley County"
- Released: 1981
- Genre: Country
- Label: Crescent 101
- Songwriters: Don Lee, George White

Don Lee singles chronology
| "I'm in Love with a Memory" (1981) | "16 Lovin' Ounces to the Pound" (1982) |

"I'm in Love with a Memory" was a chart hit for country musician Don Lee. It stayed on the charts for five weeks.

== Background ==
The song was composed by Don Lee and George White. It was released on Crescent 101 in 1981.

== Chart performance ==
The single was a Top Single Pick in the Adult Contemporary section of the January 23, 1982, issue of Billboard. In the March 27, 1982, issue of Billboard, it was announced that Don Lee had another hit with "I'm in Love with a Memory" and it was breaking out with eighteen radio station listed.

The single entered the Cash Box Top 100 Country Singles chart at No. 94 on April 17, 1982. It peaked at No. 85 on May 8, 1982.
