= Jerry Naylor =

American country music singer (1939–2019)

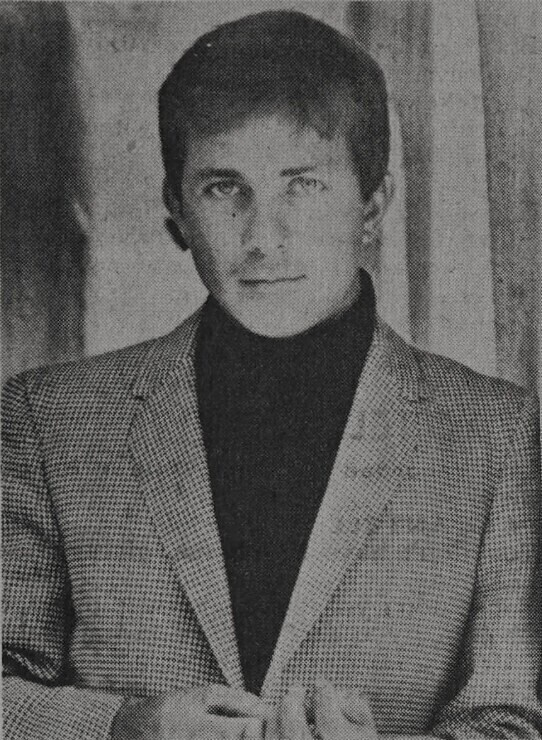

Background information
- Born: Jerry Naylor Jackson; March 6, 1939; Chalk Mountain, Texas, U.S.
- Died: December 5, 2019 (aged 80) McMinnville, Oregon, U.S.
- Genres: Country, rock and roll
- Occupations: Musician, inspirational speaker
- Instruments: Vocals, Guitar
- Years active: 1953–2019
- Website: www.jerrynaylor.com/rockabilly/

Jerry Naylor Jackson (March 6, 1939 – December 5, 2019) was an American country and rock and roll artist, broadcaster and inspirational speaker. From late 1961 through 1964 he was The Crickets' lead vocalist and guitarist.

== Early life and career ==
Naylor was born in Chalk Mountain, Texas, to a farming family during the Great Depression. His mother played piano in their local church and encouraged his love of music. He listened to Country music the most including artists such as: Hank Williams, Sr., Lefty Frizzell, Bob Wills (with whom he shared his birthday) and Slim Whitman, and Whitman's steel guitar player, Hoot Raines (who led the 9-year old Naylor to purchase and learn to play a steel guitar with money he earned picking cotton). By the age of twelve, Naylor was playing that steel guitar at local honky tonks in and around Carlsbad and San Angelo, Texas, with his brother-in-law, Tommy Briggs' Hillbilly band. The band also featured Sherman Hamblin on fiddle and Earnest Smith lead guitar and vocals.

In 1953, at the age of 14, Naylor began working at a new radio station in San Angelo, Texas, called KPEP. Veteran broadcaster, Joe Treadway, who with his wife Matilda (Tillie) would become Naylor's foster parents when his mother died in 1955. They hired Naylor and taught him to be a disc jockey, radio commercial salesman, and radio maintenance engineer. Joe Treadway encouraged Naylor to continue his performing, but on the insistence of his mother, gave him the opportunity to be the lead singer of the band. KPEP was co-owned by Joe Treadway and Dave Stone (Pinkstone) who also owned the KDAV radio station in Lubbock, Texas, where Buddy Holly was also an on-air performer with Bob Montgomery, "Buddy & Bob".

These two West Texas radio stations were the first full-time country music radio stations in America and promoted live touring shows throughout West Texas with stars from the Grand Ole Opry in Nashville, Tennessee, and the Louisiana Hayride in Shreveport, Louisiana.

Joe Treadway and his close friend, Tillman Franks, Talent Coordinator for the Louisiana Hayride, managed Naylor's young singing career and booked him and his band on these touring shows. It was here at KPEP that Naylor first heard rockabilly music, at its very beginning. After hearing and playing Elvis Presley's "That's Alright Mama" Sun Records recording, Naylor was backed by a Trio from San Angelo called the Cavaliers at a talent show there in 1956. At the time Alton Baird was the band's original lead singer. In c.1957 after Baird went into the military, Naylor became the lead singer of the rockabilly band The Cavaliers.

=== Career with The Crickets ===
In 1961, Naylor became the lead singer for the Crickets, two years after the death of Buddy Holly and the departure of other singers (Earl Sinks, David Box) from the group. Jerry Allison, Buddy Holly's drummer and co-songwriter, owned the name and trademark of "The Crickets". Allison, now the sole owner of "The Crickets" and their manager, H. Daniel Whitman, offered Naylor the lead singer position with The Crickets following their signing with Liberty Records, Hollywood, California. He recorded as lead singer with the Crickets until 1964. Their first hit for the label was "Don't Ever Change", a Carole King/Gerry Goffin written song, which reached the number 5 position on the national charts in the UK. The first song the new Beatles group performed live on BBC, in 1963, was The Crickets' hit, "Don't Ever Change." and the Beatles all acknowledged the Crickets influence in a letter sent to them following a Crickets tour of the UK in 1962. More hit singles followed and the Bobby Vee Meets the Crickets Album was a best-selling album in the UK and Europe. The Crickets also had a hit EP recording on EMI/Liberty Records in 1963, featuring four tracks including, "My Little Girl" and "Teardrops Fall Like Rain," both featured in the Columbia Motion Pictures Movie, Just for Fun.

== Career in later years ==
Naylor had success with a song "Is This All There Is To A Honky Tonk" that was written by Don Lee and Robert L. Duncan. By December 1974, it was out, it was released on Melodyland 6003. The song spent ten weeks on the Country charts, peaking at No. 31 on March 29, 1975.

== Personal life and family ==
Jerry Naylor Jackson was born in Erath County, Texas. At the age of five his family moved to Carlsbad, Texas, which is 12 miles from San Angelo, Texas. Joe Treadway owner of KPEP radio station in San Angelo became interested in the young teenager and trained him as a DJ. It seems he also sang on KPEP radio with the station's band. When Jerry Jackson joined a talent competition in 1956, he was a student at San Angelo's "Lakeview High School." He met the Cavalier rockabilly band's founders at this location. They were Carroll Smith, Alton Baird, and Sid Holmes. Jerry Naylor Jackson would temporarily join this band as the main vocalist in the spring of 1957. By late 1957 he joined the Army and went to Germany after basic. During 1962 while living in California Jerry joined The Crickets, alternating with Sonny Curtis in singing lead with the band until March 1965. He appeared with the Crickets in the UK movie "Just for Fun" in 1963, and also "The Girls on the Beach" in 1965. After his time with The Crickets, Jerry had a solo career in different genres and was inducted into the Rockabilly Hall of Fame. On January 30, 1966, Naylor married Pamela Ann Robinson. Jerry and Pamela, married over four decades, have three children and six grandchildren.

Naylor died on December 5, 2019, at the age of 80.
