= Don Lee (musician) =

American musician

- Born: Donald Lee Tunison; August 25, 1941; Dexter, Kansas, United States
- Died: December 8, 1995 (aged 54) Valencia, California
- Genres: Country
- Occupations: Musician, songwriter, producer
- Instrument: Guitar
- Years active: 1950s–1990s
- Labels: Crescent, Crown Records, Custom Records, Album Concepts

Don Lee (August 25, 1941 – December 8, 1995) was an American country singer, song writer, producer and guitarist who recorded in the 1960s and 1970s. He had a hit on the country charts with "16 Lovin' Ounces to the Pound". He also wrote a couple more songs that became hits. One became a hit for Jerry Naylor.

== Background ==
In addition to his country music background, he was a guitarist who also had a rock background. He recorded material in the 1960s that was released on two albums. Years later his album Keepin' It Country was released. There is speculation that he also had a connection to The Champs of "Tequila fame as well as being a member of Don Rich's group The Buckaroos.

== Career ==
=== 1960s to 1970s ===
Between 1967 and 1969, Lee had two albums released on the Custom and Crown labels. They were Dreams Of The Everyday Housewife and True Grit (And Other Pop Country Favorites). He also released an album during the 1960s, I Love You So Much It Hurts And Other Country And Western Favorites under the pseudonym of Terry Lee.

In October, 1974, Lee was appearing at the Country Western Jubilee festival which was held outside Los Angeles at Devonshire Downs between the 11th and 13th. Two months later in December, a song he co-wrote with Robert L. Duncan, "Is This All There Is To A Honky Tonk" and recorded by Jerry Naylor was released on a single. Backed with "You're The One" it was released on Melodyland 6003. The song spent ten weeks on the Country charts, peaking at #31 on March 29, 1975. In 1976, a song he co-wrote with Lloyd Goodson, "Jesus is the Same in California" was released on United Artists UA-XW891-Y. It became a hit for Goodson. Spending six weeks in the charts, it peaked at #80 on November 12, 1976.

=== 1980s ===
In 1981, his own single "I'm In Love With A Memory" bw "Cowley County" was released on Crescent 101. It was co-written with George R. White. By July 1982, his song "16 Lovin' Ounces To The Pound" was released. It was produced by Lee himself and co-written with B. Duncan, B. R. Jones and J. R. Halper. It stayed on the charts for three weeks peaking at #86 on September 18, 1982.

== Death ==
Lee died on December 8, 1995, at age 54.

== Compositions ==
Composition	Artist	Release	Catalogue	Year	Notes #
"Is This All There Is To A Honky Tonk"	Jerry Naylor	"Is This All there is to a Honky Tonk" / "You're The One"	Melodyland 6003	1974	
"Dallas Champagne" "The Man That Fronts The Bandstand"	Bobby Wyld	"Dallas Champagne" /"The Man That Fronts The Bandstand"	Wytra WY 1002	1975	
"The Beartrap" "I'm Gonna Miss Me (In Your Arms Tonight"	Tex Williams	"The Beartrap" / "I'm Gonna Miss Me (In Your Arms Tonight)"	Denim 1005	1975	
"The More She Thinks About Him"	C. L. Goodson	"18 Yellow Roses" / "The More She Thinks About Him"	Island IS 1030-A / B	1975	*
"Jesus is the Same in California"	Lloyd Goodson	"Jesus Is The Same In California" / "Wearin' Out The Patches On My Knees"	United Artists UA-XW891-Y	1976	
"I'm in Love with a Memory" "Cowley County"	Don Lee	"I'm in Love with a Memory" / "Cowley County"	Crescent Records 101	1981	
"16 Lovin' Ounces to the Pound" "All I Ever Wanted Was You (Here Lovin' Me)"	Don Lee	"16 Lovin' Ounces to the Pound"/ "All I Ever Wanted Was You (Here Lovin' Me)"	Crescent Records 103	1982	

== Discography ==
Singles
Act	Release	Catalogue	Year	Notes #
Don Lee	"I Found a Way" / "Time Will Stand Still"	ARCO Records 6607	196?	
Don Lee	"The Heaven We Shared" / "West Memphis Arkansas"	Newhall Records N 7105	197?	
Don Lee	"I'm In Love With A Memory" / "Cowley County"	Crescent Records 101	1981	
Don Lee	"16 Lovin' Ounces to the Pound" / "All I Ever Wanted Was You (Here Lovin' Me)"	Crescent Records 103	1982	
Don Lee Billy Lee Riley	"I Found a Way" / "St. James Infirmary"	FTM LTD DJ AVA 2014	2014	Re-release; B. side is Billy Lee Riley

Albums
Act	Release	Catalogue	Year	Notes #
Terry Lee	I Love You So Much It Hurts And Other Country And Western Favorites	Crown CST 558	196?	
Don Lee	Dreams Of The Everyday Housewife	Custom CS 1126	1967	
Don Lee	True Grit (And Other Pop Country Favorites)	Crown Records CST 593	1969	
Don Lee	Keepin' It Country	Album Concepts 4023		
