= Lloyd Goodson =

American musician

- Birth name: Cecil Lloyd Goodson
- Born: Tarrant Co., Texas
- Genres: Country
- Occupation: Musician
- Labels: United Artists, Mercury, Dee Jay

Lloyd Goodson is a country singer and songwriter who recorded for various record labels during the 1970s and 1980s. He had a hit with "Jesus is the Same in California". He also worked closely with Don Lee composing songs which were also covered by other artists.

== Background ==
In addition to being a singer, Goodson was also a composer who composed songs with Don Lee. These included "Wishin' I Could Change the Fool I've Been" , "The Man Who Fronts the Bandstand", and "The Bear Trap" which was recorded by Tex Williams. Backed with "I'm Gonna Miss Me (In Your Arms Tonight)" it was released as a single in November, 1976 on Denim 1005. A humorous type of song with a warning to possum hunters, it told of how a man's buddy sits on a bear trap and runs out of chain. Goodson and Lee would also compose "Jesus is the Same in California" which would bring him success. His brother Gerald Goodson is also a singer.

== Career ==
=== 1970s ===
In 1975, Goodson had a single released on the Island label. Credited to C. L. Goodson, the single was "18 Yellow Roses" bw "The More She Thinks About Him". Recorded at Independent Recorders, Studio City, California, both sides were produced by Don Lee.

In 1976, the song he co wrote with Don Lee, "Jesus is the Same in California" was released as a single on United Artists UA-XW891-Y. Similar to a Merle Haggard type of song, it told a story of a man in Folsom Prison who receives a letter from his mother who had faith that Jesus is in California as he is there where she is in Tennessee. It would become a hit for him. Spending six weeks in the charts, it peaked at #80 on November 12 that year. It also made the Cashbox charts and at one stage in the week ending December 25, 1976 where it was at #16.

In 1977, he had a single "Down Home Up Bringin'" out on the United Artists label.

=== 1980s ===
In August 1980, his single "There's No Such Thing as a Cheap Motel" was out Mercury 50728. In 1987, "Fallin‘ Down Old Beer Joint" bw "Sweetheart’s Grave" was released on the Dee Jay label.

== Discography ==
Singles
Act	Release	Catalogue	Year	Notes #
C. L. Goodson	"18 Yellow Roses" / "The More She Thinks About Him"	Island IS-030	1975	
Lloyd Goodson	"Jesus is the Same in California" / "Wearin' Out the Patches on My Knees"	United Artists UA-XW891-Y	1976	
Lloyd Goodson	"Down Home Up Bringin'" / "Wishin' I Could Change The Kind Of Fool I've Been"	United ArtistsUA-XW952-Y	1977	
Lloyd Goodson	"There's No Such Thing As A Cheap Motel" / "Dreamin' Dreams And Wishin' Rain"	Mercury 50728	1980	
Lloyd Goodson	"Fallin‘ Down Old Beer Joint" / "Sweetheart’s Grave"	Dee Jay DJ 204	1987	
