= The Blues (B. B. King album) =

Compilation album by B.B. King
- Released: 1958
- Recorded: 1951–1958
- Genre: Blues
- Length: 33:38
- Label: Crown

B.B. King chronology
Singin' the Blues (1957)	The Blues (1958)	B.B. King Wails (1959)

The Blues is the second album by blues artist B.B. King, released in 1958 by the Bihari brothers on their budget Crown label. The album collects 12 tracks that King recorded between 1951 and 1958 for Kent and RPM. As common practice with the record label, Crown released The Blues off the strength of the single "When My Heart Beats Like a Hammer", a Top 10 R&B chart single in 1958, to help sell a collection of less-popular songs. King's signature style of single-note riffs and powerful string bends is present on the album, however it is also commanded by horn-driven performances.

== Critical reception ==
Professional ratings
Review scores
Source	Rating
AllMusic	4.5/5 stars
Billboard	4 stars
The Penguin Guide to Blues Recordings	3/4 stars
The Rolling Stone Album Guide (1991 Reissue)	4/5 stars

The Blues has received positive reviews, with Mark Deming of AllMusic's review stating that King was "already near the top of his class". The Rolling Stone Album Guide also commented that the collection of tracks showcased the studio band peak form, spotlighting the tracks "Ruby Lee", "Past Day" and "Boogie Woogie Woman". Billboard gave the album four out of four stars, saying that it was "A good low-price R&B set", "The vocals by King are in the old rhythm and blues tradition", and that it was "Potent stuff for the racks".

== Track listing ==
The original Crown LP and many reissues do not list the songwriters, producers, nor running times. Details are taken from the AllMusic review and may differ from other sources.

Side one
No.	Title	Writer(s)	Length
1.	"Why Do Things Happen to Me"	Roy Hawkins, Jules Taub a.k.a. Jules Bihari	2:49
2.	"Ruby Lee"	King, Taub	2:38
3.	"When My Heart Beats Like a Hammer"	John Lee Williamson a.k.a. Sonny Boy Williamson I	2:56
4.	"Past Day"	Joe Josea a.k.a. Joe Bihari, King	3:17
5.	"Boogie Woogie Woman"	King, Taub	2:49
6.	"Early Every Morning"	Josea, King	2:36

Side two
No.	Title	Writer(s)	Length
1.	"I Want to Get Married"	Josea, King	3:04
2.	"That Ain't the Way to Do It"	King, Taub	2:19
3.	"Troubles, Troubles, Troubles"	King, Sam Ling a.k.a. Saul Bihari	2:59
4.	"Don't You Want a Man Like Me"	Taub	2:41
5.	"You Know I Go for You"	King, Ling, Taub	2:40
6.	"What Can I Do"	King, Taub	2:50
Total length:			33:38
