= Is This All There Is to a Honky Tonk =

1974 song by Jerry Naylor

Single by Jerry Naylor
- B-side: "All I Ever Wanted Was You (Here Lovin' Me)"
- Released: 1974
- Genre: Country
- Label: Melodyland 6003
- Songwriter(s): B. Duncan, D. Lee

"Is This All There Is to a Honky Tonk" was a hit on the country music charts for singer Jerry Naylor in 1974.

== Background ==
"Is This All There Is to a Honky Tonk" was written by Robert L. Duncan and Don Lee. It was recorded by Jerry Naylor and backed with "You're The One", it was released on Melodyland 6003. It appeared in the Billboard Top Single Picks in December, 1974. The song spent ten weeks on the country charts, peaking at #31 on March 29, 1975.

== Other versions ==
Tony Booth did a version of the song which was the title song of his album of the same name.
