= Georges Montalba =

American organist (1929–2001)

Georges Montalba was the pseudonym used by pipe organist Robert Hunter (April 14, 1929 – September 10, 2001), a resident of Glendale, California, United States. In 1958, Hunter/Montalba recorded Pipe Organ Favorites & Fantasy in Pipe Organ and Percussion at the Lorin Whitney Studios for Somerset Stereo-Fidelity Records. Both albums were later reissued on CD on the Hit Thing label. Robert Hunter later went on to work with George Burns and Carol Channing on Broadway.
