= Custom Records =

Defunct American budget record label

- Parent company: Modern Records
- Status: defunct
- Genre: Various
- Country of origin: United States
- Location: Los Angeles California

Custom Records was a budget record label owned by the Bihari Brothers.

== Background ==
The label was a subsidiary of Modern Records. It was formed some time prior to March 1965 and according to an article in Billboard, it was a new label that already had 31 LPs in its catalogue. The records were to sell at $1.98 as opposed to the other budget LPs that retailed at 98 cents and 99 cents. Saul Bihari recognized the value of the rack jobber for these types of records.

Some of the records were re-releases of previous Crown releases and the covers often featured a female in some pose designed to attract attention.

== Trends ==
=== Covering artists ===
One artist that was covered by Custom was Hank Williams. The album Your Cheatin' Heart and other Hank Williams Favorites Custom CM 1023, CS 1023 featured a singer called Johnny Williams who was really Curley Williams. Later the It's Happening album by The Dave Clark Five And The Playbacks was released on Custom CS 1098. The album only had 2 tracks by the Dave Clark Five with The Playbacks covering the remainder. It was also released on Crown CST 473 in 1964. The Playbacks appear to be just studio musicians.

=== Exploiting the Psychedelic trend ===
In 1967, the label released More Psychedellic Guitars CS-1096 (with 2 LLs), an album that featured the tracks "Another Trip", "Really Got It Bad", "Out Of Touch", The Letdown" "Psychedelic A-Go-Go" Flower Power", "Flower Power/Can You Dig It", "Sit- In", "Lost In Space", and "Psychedelic Venture". This like the earlier release Psychedellic Guitars CM 2078, appears to be reissues of earlier Jerry Cole albums with the titles changed. This music however wasn't quite Psychedelic. One Exploito album that was a bit more in the psych mode was Are You Experienced by T. Swift & The Electric Bag. This also featured Cole.

== Later years ==
In 1978, the company appeared to be still in operation with a large section of the page in the January 7 issue of Billboard magazine, offering congratulations to fellow Los Angeles label Laff Records for their ten-year anniversary.

== List of artists ==
- Jerry Cole
- Stan Getz
- Coleman Hawkins
- B.B. King
- Don Lee
- Jimmy McCracklin
- Jimmy Smith
- Curley Williams
