= Crown Records =

Budget label of Modern Records (1957–1972)

Crown Records was a budget record label founded as a subsidiary of Modern Records in 1957. It has been the name of several different record labels, listed below.

== Discography ==
=== Mono ===
Mono albums
- CLP-5001...v/a: A Rock 'n Roll Dance Party LP (1957), w/ Etta James, Marvin and Johnny, The Cadets, The Teen Queens, Jimmy Beasley, Joe Turner, Joe Houston, Little Clydie, The Jacks
- CLP-5002...Stan Getz: Groovin' High LP (1957)
- CLP-5003...Kay Starr/Erroll Garner: Singin' Kay Starr/Swingin' Erroll Garner LP (1957)
- CLP-5004...Wardell Gray: Way Out Wardell LP (1957)
- CLP-5005...Don Dick 'n Jimmy: Spring Fever LP (1957)
- CLP-5006...Joe Houston: Rocks and Rolls All Nite Long LP (1957)
- CLP-5007...Vido Musso: The Swingin'st LP (1957)
- CLP-5008...Jazz Surprise! LP (1957)
- CLP-5009...Modern Jazz Stars: Jazz Masquerade LP (1957)
- CLP-5010...Hadda Brooks: Femme Fatale LP (1957)
- CLP-5011...v/a: Hollywood Rock 'n Roll Record Hop LP (1957), Cadets, Shirley Gunter, Jacks, Joe Houston, Dolly Cooper, Etta James, Marvin and Johnny, Cliques, Young Jessie, Joe Turner
- CLP-5012...Red Callender: Callender Speaks Low LP (1957)
- CLP-5013...v/a: Stars of Rock 'N Roll LP (1957)
- CLP-5014...Jimmy Beasley: Fabulous LP (1957)
- CLP-5015...Cadets: Rockin' n' Reelin' LP (1957)
- CLP-5016...Oscar McLollie and His Honey Jumpers: Oscar McLollie and His Honey Jumpers LP (probably unissued)
- CLP-5017...Three Tops: Dinner Time LP (1957)
- CLP-5018...Don Ralke Orchestra and Singers: Very Truly Yours LP (1957)
- CLP-5019...Don Ralke: Bongo Madness LP (1957)
- CLP-5020...B.B. King: Singin' the Blues LP (1957)
- CLP-5021...The Jacks: Jumpin' with the Jacks LP (1957)
- CLP-5022...Teen Queens: Eddie My Love LP (1957)
- CLP-5023...Betty Staples: Organ Fantasy In Hi-Fi LP (1957)
- CLP-5024...Willard McDaniel: '88' a la Carte LP (1957)
- CLP-5025...Red Callender with Buddy Collette: Swingin' Suite LP (1957)
- CLP-5026...Phil Martin Orchestra: String of Pearls LP (1957)
- CLP-5027...Phil Martin Orchestra: For Swingin' Dancers LP (1957)
- CLP-5028...Aaron Collins: Calypso, U.S.A. LP (1957)
- CLP-5029...Vido Musso Orchestra: Teen Age Dance Party LP (1957) - (featuring Doug McClure on front cover)
- CLP-5030...Hans Hagan Orchestra: Around the World In 80 Days LP (1957)
- CLP-5031...Louis Polliemon/Lord Preston Epps: Calypso Trinidad LP (1957)
- CLP-5032...Eddie Gomez and His Latin American Orchestra: Cuban Mist Cha Cha Cha LP (1957)
- CLP-5033...Hollywood Studio Orchestra: Music from Great Motion Picture Hits LP (1957)
- CLP-5034...Dean Lester and Orchestra: Salute to the Big Bands LP (1957)
- CLP-5035...Hans Hagen Conducting the Viennese Colonade Orchestra: Beautiful Strauss Waltzes from Vienna LP (1957)
- CLP-5036...Oklahoma! LP (1957), studio cast
- CLP-5037...The Crazy Guy: Honky Tonk Piano LP (1957)
- CLP-5038...12 Top Hits LP (1957), studio group
- CLP-5039...Dean Lester and His Orchestra: Saturday Nite Date LP (1957)
- CLP-5040...Doug Elliott: Songs Jolson Made Famous LP (1957)
- CLP-5041...Stephen Foster Melodies LP (1957), studio group
- CLP-5042...My Fair Lady LP (1957), studio cast
- CLP-5043...Eddie Gomez Orchestra: Caribbean Rendezvous LP (1957)
- CLP-5044..The Polynesians: Aloha Hawaii LP (1957)
- CLP-5045...Kings of Dixieland: Fantabulous Kings of Dixieland LP (1957)
- CLP-5046...Jon Trevanni and his Continental Orchestra: I'm in the Nude for Love LP (1957)
- CLP-5047...Members of the Dorsey Orchestra: A Toast To Tommy and Jimmy Dorsey LP (1957)
- CLP-5048...Pierre Legendre & Paris International Orchestra: Paris Nite Life LP (1957)
- CLP-5049...Ivan Dittmars: Joy To the World LP (1957)
- CLP-5050...Maxwell Davis: Tribute To Glenn Miller LP (1957)
- CLP-5051...Nelson Riddle and Billy May: Bob Savage Carries the Torch LP (1957)
- CLP-5052...Anton Paulik: Vienna Nite Life LP (1957)
- CLP-5053...Duke Hazlett with Orchestra conducted by Tom Davis & Hans Hagan: Pal Joey LP (1957)
- CLP-5054...Hans Hagan Orchestra: South Pacific LP (1958)
- CLP-5055...Alex Pulaski and the Polka Dots: Polka Parade LP (1958)
- CLP-5056...v/a: Jazz Confidential LP (1958)
- CLP-5057...Paul Sykes: Great American Folk Songs LP (1958)
- CLP-5058...Pete Johnson and Hadda Brooks: Swings the Boogie LP (1958)
- CLP-5059...Vienna World Symphony: Brahms First Symphony LP (1958)
- CLP-5060...Luiz Jiminez: Fury of the Brave Bulls LP (1958)
- CLP-5061...Vienna Pro Arte Orchestra: Scheherazade LP (1958)
- CLP-5062...The Music Man LP (1958), studio group
- CLP-5063...B.B. King: The Blues LP (1958), reissue of early '50s 45s
- CLP-5064...Bernie Anders Orchestra: Gigi LP (1958)
- CLP-5065...International Symphony Orchestra: Peer Gynt Suite LP (1958)
- CLP-5066...Vienna Pro Arte Orchestra: L'arlesienne Suites 1 and 2 LP (1958)
- CLP-5067...International Symphony Orchestra: Nutcracker Suite LP (1958)
- CLP-5068...Les Howard Orchestra: In the Miller Mood LP (1958)
- CLP-5069...Johnny O'Toole & His "Naughty Naughty Band": The Gay 90s LP (1958)
- CLP-5070...Billy Randolph & the High Hatters: Roaring 20's LP (1958)
- CLP-5071...International Symphony Orchestra: Don Juan and Capricco-Espagnol LP (1958)
- CLP-5072...Dance, Dance, Dance LP (1958), studio group
- CLP-5073...Music Made Famous By Glenn Miller LP (1958), studio group
- CLP-5074...Dean Lester Orchestra: Saturday Nite Date LP (1958)
- CLP-5075...All Time Kiddie Favorites LP (1958)
- CLP-5076...Vienna World Pops Symphony: Symphony of the Sea LP (1958)
- CLP-5077...The Brussels World's Fair Pops Symphony Orchestra: Buddy Bregman Presents Symphony of the Golden West LP (1958)
- CLP-5078...Vienna World Pops Symphony: Symphony of the Blues LP (1958)
- CLP-5079...Wilhelm Strauss/Igor Kousevsky conducting the International Symphony Orchestra: Tchaikovsky Concerto No. 1 LP (1958)
- CLP-5080...Hawaiians: Holiday In Hawaii LP (1958)
- CLP-5081...Johnny Cole and the Robert Evans Chorus: Christmas Carols LP (1958)
- CLP-5082...Brass Swingin' Band LP (1958), studio group
- CLP-5083...Kiddies Christmas LP (1958), studio group
- CLP-5084...Johnny Cole and Robert Evans Chorus: Hymns LP (1958)
- CLP-5085...Port of Suez: Exotic Music of the Middle East LP (1958), studio group, mostly same as Mohammed El-Sulieman and His Oriental Ensemble: The Music of Port Said LP (Coronet, 1959?), East of Suez LP (Broadway), and Ali Beirut's Orientales: Music of the Near East LP (Pirouette)
- CLP-5086...William Daly: Merry Christmas LP (1958)
- CLP-5087...College Songs LP (1958), studio group
- CLP-5088...Dean Lester: Champagne Music for Dancing LP (1958)
- CLP-5089...The Crazy Guy: Honky Tonk Piano Volume 2 LP (1958)
- CLP-5090...Members of Benny Goodman Orchestra & Brussels World's Fair Orchestra: Salute Benny Goodman LP (1959)
- CLP-5091...William Daly: Organ Rhapsody LP (1959)
- CLP-5092...Members Goodman Orchestra: Salute to Benny Goodman LP (1959)
- CLP-5093...Salute to Stan Kenton LP (1959)
- CLP-5094...Members of the Charlie Barnet Orchestra: A Tribute to Charlie Barnet in Hi-Fi LP (1959)
- CLP-5095...OST: The Moon Is Blue LP (1959)
- CLP-5096...Louis Martinelli Continentals: Cocktails for Two LP (1959)
- CLP-5097...Members Goodman Orchestra: A Toast to Benny Goodman LP (1959)
- CLP-5098...Kiddies Singing Stories and Games LP (1959), studio group
- CLP-5099...Kiddies' Singing Storbook LP (1959), studio group
- CLP-5100...Songs of Kiddie Land LP (1959), studio group
- CLP-5101...Ted Nash and Orchestra: Peter Gunn TV Themes by Mancini LP (1959)
- CLP-5102...Members Shaw Orchestra: Tribute to Artie Shaw LP (1959)
- CLP-5103...Maxwell Davis: Tribute to Woody Herman LP (1959)
- CLP-5104...Dave Nogell Conducting the Hollywood Studio Orchestra and Chorus: Porgy and Bess LP (1959)
- CLP-5105...Johnny Cross Quartet: Flower Drum Song LP (1959)
- CLP-5106...Members of the Perez Prado Orchestra: Mambo Jambo LP (1959)
- CLP-5107...Maxwell Davis: Compositions of Lionel Hampton LP (1959)
- CLP-5108...Johnny Cole: Sings Dreams of Italy LP (1959)
- CLP-5109...Jose Barroso: Flamenco LP (1959)
- CLP-5110...Milt Raskin: Kapu (Forbidden) LP (1959)
- CLP-5111...Members of the Count Basie Orchestra: Compositions of Count Basie and Others LP (1959)
- CLP-5112...The Ink Spots: Greatest Hits LP (1959)
- CLP-5113...A Tribute to George M. Cohan LP (1959), studio group
- CLP-5114...Charlie Barnet: A Tribute To Harry James LP (1959)
- CLP-5115...B.B. King: Wails LP (1959)
- CLP-5116...Thousand Strings Orchestra: Your Invitation to Stereo LP (1959)
- CLP-5117...Sing Along LP (1959), studio group
- CLP-5118...The Mighty Pipe Organ LP (1959), studio group
- CLP-5119...B.B. King: Sings Spirituals LP (1959)
- CLP-5120...The Hamburg Philharmonic Orchestra & Karl Jergens: 1812 Overture/Warsaw Concerto LP (1959)
- CLP-5121...Johnny Williams & the Singing Cowboys: A Tribute To Hank Williams LP (1959)
- CLP-5122...Nearer To God LP (1959), studio group
- CLP-5123...Memories of Glenn Miller LP (1959), studio group
- CLP-5124...Ravel's Bolero Tchaikovsky's March Slav LP (1959), studio group
- CLP-5125...Vienna Colonade Orchestra: Beautiful Viennese Waltzes LP (1959)
- CLP-5126...Exciting Sounds of the Name Bands LP (1959), studio group
- CLP-5127...Charlie Barnet: Charlie Barnet Presents a Salute To Harry James LP (1959)
- CLP-5128...Night In Madrid LP (1959), studio group
- CLP-5129...Kings of Dixieland: Volume Two LP (1959)
- CLP-5130...The Polynesians: Blue Hawaii LP (1959)
- CLP-5131...1000 Strings: Play for Christmas LP (1959)
- CLP-5132...Johnny Cole and His Chorus: Wishing You a Merry Christmas LP (1959)
- CLP-5133...La Tino Cha Cha Cha LP (1959), studio group
- CLP-5134...Charlie Barnet: On Stage with Charlie Barnet LP (1959)
- CLP-5135...The Sound of Music LP (1959), studio group
- CLP-5136...The Polynesians: Polynesia LP (1959), reissued as Chango and the Polynesians: Polynesian Percussion (Premier/Directional Sound, DS 5012, 1961)
- CLP-5137...New World Symphony LP (1959), studio group
- CLP-5138...Manuel Rivera and His Orchestra: Dance Tempo Cha Cha Cha LP (1959)
- CLP-5139...Kings of Dixieland: Kings of Dixieland Volume 3 LP (1959)
- CLP-5140...Maxwell Davis Conducting Members of Their Great Orchestras: Exciting Sounds of the Name Bands Volume Two LP (1959)
- CLP-5141...George Liberace: Dine and Dance LP (1959)
- CLP-5142...The Ink Spots: Ink Spots LP (1959)
- CLP-5143...B.B. King: The Great B.B. King LP (1960)
- CLP-5144...v/a: Best of the Oldies and Goodies LP (1959)
- CLP-5145...Jesse Belvin: The Casual Jesse Belvin LP (1959)
- CLP-5146...The Latin Touch LP (1960), studio group
- CLP-5147...The Grand Canyon Suite LP (1960), studio group
- CLP-5148...Can Can LP (1960)
- CLP-5149...Beethoven's Fifth Symphony LP (1960), studio group
- CLP-5150...Heart of Spain LP (1960), studio group
- CLP-5151...George Liberace: George Liberace Goes Latin..... LP (1960)
- CLP-5152...I Remember Paris LP (1960), studio group
- CLP-5153...Maxwell Davis & B.B. King: Compositions of Duke Ellington and Others LP (1960)
- CLP-5154...Schubert: Unfinished Symphony, Symphony #3 LP (1960), studio group
- CLP-5155...Polka Party LP (1960), studio group
- CLP-5156...Jimmy Witherspoon: Jimmy Witherspoon LP (1960)
- CLP-5157...John Lee Hooker: The Blues LP (1960)
- CLP-5158...Rex Trailer and the Playboys: Country and Western LP (1960)
- CLP-5159...Latin All Stars: Jazz Heat Bongo Beat LP (1960)
- CLP-5160...The Crazy Guy: Barrel House Piano LP (1960)
- CLP-5161...Bizet's Carmen Suite Schumann Manfred Overture LP (1960), studio group
- CLP-5162...Conte Candoli All Stars: Little Band Big Jazz LP (1960)
- CLP-5163...Voices of Hawaii: The Magic of Hawaii LP (1960)
- CLP-5164...Tito Guererra: Arriba LP (1960)
- CLP-5165...Louis Martinelli and the Continentals: L'amore D'Italia LP (1960)
- CLP-5166..Sounds of a Thousand Strings: Cloud Nine LP (1960)
- CLP-5167...B.B. King: King of the Blues LP (1960)
- CLP-5168...Elmore James and the Broom Dusters: Blues After Hours LP (1960)
- CLP-5169...Round Up Time for the Kiddies LP (1960), studio group
- CLP-5170...Billy Boyd: Twangy Guitars LP (1960)
- CLP-5171...Louis Martinelli and the Continentals: Latin Twist LP (1960)
- CLP-5172...Lilie Wollin: Chopin Favorites LP (1960)
- CLP-5173...1000 Strings: Music for Big Dame Hunters LP (1960)
- CLP-5174...Harmonica Hot Shots: Harmonica Favorites LP (1960)
- CLP-5175...Pee Wee Crayton: Pee Wee Crayton LP (1960)
- CLP-5176...Members Dorsey Orchestra: Tribute to Tommy Dorsey LP (1960)
- CLP-5177...Gypsy Love Songs LP (1960), studio group
- CLP-5178...Liberace: Ooh La La LP (1960)
- CLP-5179...Sterling Blythe: Sings LP (1960)
- CLP-5180...Woody Herman: The New Swingin' Herman Herd LP (1960)
- CLP-5181...Coleman Hawkins: Coleman Hawkins and His Orchestra LP (1960)
- CLP-5182...Kings of Dixieland: Kings of Dixieland Volume 4 LP (1960)
- CLP-5183...Chubby Jackson: Chubby Jackson Discovers Maria Marshall LP (1960)
- CLP-5184...Los Cinco Caballeros: Latin Hurricane LP (1960)
- CLP-5185...Swan Lake Ballet LP (1960), studio group
- CLP-5186...Johnny Williams and the Playboys: A Salute to Hank Williams LP (1960)
- CLP-5187...Jesse Belvin: The Unforgettable Jesse Belvin LP (1961)
- CLP-5188...B.B. King: My Kind of Blues LP (1961)
- CLP-5189...Milt Raskin: Exotic Percussion LP (1961)
- CLP-5190...1000 Strings: The Heart of Spain, Vol. 2 LP (1961)
- CLP-5191...The Polynesians: Beautiful Hawaii LP (1961)
- CLP-5192...Jimmy Witherspoon: Sings the Blues LP (1961)
- CLP-5193...Percussion All Stars: Predominant Percussion LP (1961)
- CLP-5194...Smith Singers: Christmas Carols LP (1961)
- CLP-5195...Sing Along Christmas Carols LP (1961), studio group
- CLP-5196...Fred Kirby: Christmas Favorites LP (1961)
- CLP-5197...Ink Spots: Sensational Ink Spots LP (1961)
- CLP-5198...George Liberace and His Orchestra: Hawaiian Paradise LP (1961)
- CLP-5199...Hamburg Philharmonic: Gaite Parisienne LP (1961)
- CLP-5200...Kings of Dixieland: Kings of Dixieland Volume 5 LP (1961)
- CLP-5201...Jim Day: Organ Favorites LP (1961)
- CLP-5202...v/a: More Oldies and Goodies LP (1961)
- CLP-5203...Joe Houston: Wild Man of the Tenor Sax LP (1961)
- CLP-5204...Rudy Vallée: Is This Your Rudy Vallée? LP (1961)
- CLP-5205...Drink-a-Long Sing-a-Long Gang LP (1961), studio group
- CLP-5206...The Polynesians: Hawaii Calling LP (1961)
- CLP-5207...Coleman Hawkins: The Hawk Swings LP (1961)
- CLP-5208...Lillie Wollin: Moonlight Sonata LP (1961)
- CLP-5209...Etta James: Miss Etta James LP (1961)
- CLP-5210...Rev. Ulric George and The Jubilee Singers: Spirituals LP (1961)
- CLP-5211...Camp Fire Sing-a-Long Gang LP (1961)
- CLP-5212...The Continental Octette: Modern Jazz Greats LP (1961)
- CLP-5213...v/a: Oldies and Goodies Country & Western #1 LP (1961)
- CLP-5214...Hawaiians: Vacation in Hawaii (1961)
- CLP-5215...The Polka Dots: Polka Time LP (1961)
- CLP-5216...?
- CLP-5217...Ink Spots: The Sensational Ink Spots LP (1961)
- (Duplicate Number) CLP-5217 The Princeton Trio by The Princeton Trio (mono)
- CLP-5218...?
- CLP-5219...Sing-A-Long Gang: Naughty Sing-A-Long Party (1961)
- CLP-5220...Continental Octette: Modern Jazz Greats Vol. 2 LP (1961?)
- CLP-5221...Ink Spots: More Ink Spots LP (1961?)
- CLP-5222...v/a: Oldies and Goodies: Country and Western Vol. II LP (1961)
- CLP-5223...Sounds of a Thousand Strings: Musical Memories (1961)
- CLP-5224...Lightnin' Hopkins: Lightning Hopkins Sings the Blues LP (1961)
- CLP-5225...Billy Randolph & The High Hatters: Roaring 20's LP (1961?)
- CLP-5226...Smokey Hogg: Sings the Blues LP (1961)
- CLP-5227...v/a: Rock N Roll Party Oldies But Goodies LP (1961?)
- CLP-5228...Eddie Dean: Hillbilly Heaven LP (1961?)
- CLP-5229...Crazy Guy: Honky Tonk Piano LP (1961?)
- CLP-5230...B.B. King: More B.B. King LP (1961)
- CLP-5231...Tony Allen and the Night Owls: Rock 'n Roll LP (1961)
- CLP-5232...John Lee Hooker: Sings the Blues LP (1961)
- CLP-5233...Rex Wells: Gunfighter Ballads LP (1961)
- CLP-5234...Etta James: The Best of Etta James LP (1961)
- CLP-5235...The Rounders: Square Dance with Call LP (1961?)
- CLP-5236...Sister Rosetta Tharpe: Sister Rosetta Tharpe LP (1961?)
- CLP-5237...Rudy Macias and His Charanga Orchestra: Pachanga If You Please LP (1961?)
- CLP-5238...v/a: Blues Oldies and Goodies LP (1961)
- CLP-5239...The Kirby Stone Four and the Sportsmen: Happy Sing-a-Long LP (1961?)
- CLP-5240...Howlin' Wolf: Howling Wolf Sings the Blues LP (1962)
- CLP-5241...v/a: Oldies and Goodies: Country and Western, Volume 3 LP (1961)
- CLP-5242...v/a: Oldies and Goodies Volume 3 LP (1961)
- CLP-5243...v/a: Oldies and Goodies Country and Western Vol. 4 LP (1961)
- CLP-5244...Jimmy McCracklin: Twist with Jimmy McCracklin LP (1962)
- CLP-5245...Teddy Reynolds and the Twisters: The Twist LP (1962)
- CLP-5246...Joe Houston: Doin' the Twist LP (1962)
- CLP-5247...Jimmy Beasley: Twist with Jimmy Beasley LP (1962)
- CLP-5248...B.B. King: Twist with B.B. King LP (1962)
- CLP-5249...v/a: Peppermint Twist LP (1962)
- CLP-5250...Etta James: Twist With Etta James LP (1962)
- CLP-5251...Steve Douglas: Twist with Steve Douglas and the Rebels LP (1962)
- CLP-5252...Joe Houston: Twisting in Orbit LP (1962?)
- CLP-5253...?
- CLP-5254...Steve Douglas and the Rebel Rousers: Popeye Twist and Stomp LP (1962)
- CLP-5255...Mike Adams and the Red Jackets: Twist Contest LP (1962)
- CLP-5256...Eddie Dean: Hillbilly Heaven LP (1962?)
- CLP-5257...?
- CLP-5258...Eddie Dean: Hillbilly Heaven LP (1962?)
- CLP-5259...?
- CLP-5260...Sounds of a Thousand Strings: Just for Listening (1962)
- CLP-5261...Manuel Rivera & His Orchestra: Latin Dances and Rhythms (1962)
- CLP-5262...?
- CLP-5263...Kings of Dixieland: Kings of Dixieland, Volume 7 (1962)
- CLP-5264...Doye O'Dell: Country Time LP (1962)
- CLP-5265...The Polynesians featuring Harry Baty, Sam Kaapuni & Bob Nichols: Lovely Hawaii (1962)
- CLP-5266...The Frontiersmen: Country Jamboree LP (1962)
- CLP-5267...?
- CLP-5268...Kay Starr and the Gerald Wiggins Trio: Kay Starr and the Gerald Wiggins Trio LP (1962)
- CLP-5269...The Polka Dots: Polka Chips LP (1962?)
- CLP-5270...Chris Christian: Organ Encores
- CLP-5271...Polynesians: Hawaiian Paradise
- CLP-5272...?
- CLP-5273...Joe Houston: Rockin and Rollin LP (1962?)
- CLP-5274...Juan Manuel con El Mariachi: Canciones Mexicanas
- CLP-5275...Erroll Garner and The Maxwell Davis Trio LP (1962?)
- CLP-5276...Larry Caldwell with Speedy Price and the Saddle Tramps: The Country Gentlemen LP (1962)
- CLP-5277...Billy Lee Riley: Harmonica and the Blues LP (1962)
- CLP-5278...Wardell Gray: Way Out Wardell LP (1962)
- CLP-5279...Sundowners: Folk Song LP (1962)
- CLP-5280...Trio Acapulco: The Heart of Mexico
- CLP-5281...Marvin and Johnny: Marvin and Johnny LP (1962)
- CLP-5282...Wally Fernez: Latin Heat Wave
- CLP-5283...?
- CLP-5284...v/a: Groovin' High LP (1962)
- CLP-5285...Frank Ovanin, the Banjo Man: Banjo Party
- CLP-5286...B.B. King: Easy Listening Blues LP (1962)
- CLP-5287...Roosevelt Sykes: Sings the Blues LP (1963)
- CLP-5288...Dave Brubeck Quartet/Paul Desmond Quartet/Cal Tjader: Dave Brubeck Quartet/Paul Desmond Quartet/Cal Tjader LP (1963?), "Jazz Latino" track is the retitled "Bill B" from the Cal Tjader Quartet LP Jazz at the Blackhawk (Fantasy, 1/20/57 session)
- CLP-5289...Gerry Mulligan—Chet Baker—Chico Hamilton—Buddy Collette—Gerald Wiggins: Gerry Mulligan—Chet Baker—Chico Hamilton—Buddy Collette—Gerald Wiggins LP (1963)
- CLP-5290...Johnny Horton: Country Style with Billy Barton and Don Hughes LP (1963?)
- CLP-5291...Jimmy Dean and the Western Gentlemen: Jimmy Dean and the Western Gentlemen LP (1963?)
- CLP-5292...Sonny Criss/Gerald Wiggins/Erroll Garner/Stan Getz: Sonny Criss, Gerald Wiggins, Erroll Garner, and Stan Getz
- CLP-5293...Erroll Garner / Wardell Gray / Barney Kessel / Gerald Wiggins LP (1963?)
- CLP-5294...v/a: King Curtis, Etta James, Jessie Belvin and Others LP (1963)
- CLP-5295...John Lee Hooker: Folk Blues LP (1963)
- CLP-5296...Trio Acapulco: Viva Mexico LP (1963?)
- CLP-5297...Trio Los Tajuarines: Old Mexico
- CLP-5298...?
- CLP-5299...Trio Los Tijuarines: A Night in Mexico
- CLP-5300...?
- CLP-5301...Polynesians: Hawaiian Memories
- CLP-5302...Buddy Collette/Howard Roberts/Jim Helms/Mel Pollan/Lee Acosta/Darien: Bossa Nova
- CLP-5303...Ray Charles and Jimmy Witherspoon: Ray Charles Meets Jimmy Witherspoon LP (1963)
- CLP-5304...Richard Kauhi and the Polynesians: Hawaiian Sunset LP (1963?)
- CLP-5305...Lester Young: Nat "King: Cole Meets Lester Young LP (1963)
- CLP-5306...Foy Willing and the Riders of the Purple Sage: Cool Water LP (1963)
- CLP-5307...Marvin Rainwater: Marvin Rainwater LP (1963)
- CLP-5308...Jimmy Dean/Billy Cotton and the Western Gentlemen: The Fabulous Jimmy Dean LP (1963)
- CLP-5309...B.B. King: Blues in My Heart LP (1963)
- CLP-5310...Chico Hamilton with Paul Horn: Chico Hamilton with Paul Horn LP (1963)
- CLP-5311...Bud Shank: Bud Shank LP (1963)
- CLP-5312...Mike Adams and The Red Jackets: Surfers Beat LP (1963)
- CLP-5313...Joe Houston: Surf Rockin' LP (1963)
- CLP-5314...Don Dailey: Surf Stompin' LP (1963)
- CLP-5315...Alex Keack: Surfers Paradise LP (1963?)
- CLP-5316...William Rodgers: Cleopatra LP (1963?)
- CLP-5317...Chet Baker Quintette: Chet Baker Quintette LP (1963)
- CLP-5318...Bob Brookmeyer: Featuring John Williams & Red Mitchell LP (1963?)
- CLP-5319...Joe Houston: Limbo LP (1963)
- CLP-5320...Eddie Dean: The Golden Cowboy
- CLP-5321...Al Terry and Johnny Tyler: Country Music Stars LP (1963)
- CLP-5322...Billy Sherman: The Folk Singer
- CLP-5323...Tommy Roe and Bobby Lee: Tommy Roe and Bobby Lee LP (1963)
- CLP-5324..."Tex: Carmen: "Tex" Carmen LP (1963)
- CLP-5325...Sonny James & Eddie Wills: Country Style LP (1963 or 1964)
- CLP-5326...Phil Campos & Paul Hansen: Famous Folk Songs LP (1963?)
- CLP-5327...Johnny Williams & Playboys: The Era of Hank Williams
- CLP-5328...Carlisle Minstrels: Hootenanny Folk Songs LP (1963?)
- CLP-5329...Jimmy Newman: Guest Star of the Grand Old Opry LP (1963)
- CLP-5330...v/a: C and W Jamboree LP (1963)
- CLP-5331...Guest Stars of the Grand Old Opry LP (1963?)
- CLP-5332...Whitey Pullen: Country Music Star LP (1963)
- CLP-5333...Ray "Ahab the Arab" Stevens and Hal Winters: Ray "Ahab the Arab" Stevens and Hal Winters LP (1963)
- CLP-5334...Casey Clark & Evelyn Harlene: In Memorial to Lonnie Baron LP (1963)
- CLP-5335...Ral Donner Ray Smith & Bobby Dale: Ral Donner Ray Smith & Bobby Dale LP (1963)
- CLP-5336...Ritchie Valens/Jerry Kole: Ritchie Valens & Jerry Kole LP (1963)
- CLP-5337...The Wear Family: Blue Grass Gospels LP (1963?)
- CLP-5338...Joe Reagan: A Tribute to Grand Ole Opry Star Cowboy Copas LP (1963?)
- CLP-5339...Pearl Bailey & Sylvia Lynn: Pearl Bailey & Sylvia Lynn LP (1963?)
- CLP-5340...Wade Holmes: Tribute to Hawkshaw Hawkins LP (1963)
- CLP-5341...Chico Hamilton/Paul Horn: The Great Chico Hamilton Featuring Paul Horn LP (1963)
- CLP-5342...Holly Lane: A Tribute to Patsy Cline LP (1963?)
- CLP-5343...Vic Damone and Johnny Cole LP (1963?)
- CLP-5344...G.M. Farley & Foggy River Boys: Country Gospel
- CLP-5345...Johnny Desmond and Norman Brooks: Johnny Desmond and Norman Brooks LP (1963?)
- CLP-5346...The Scottsville Squirrel Barkers: Blue Grass Favorite LP (1963), reissued as *CLP-5444 with different artist name and title
- CLP-5347...Mel Tormé: Mel Tormé with Robert Alda and Caesar Romero LP (1963)
- CLP-5348...John Foster: Theme from Lawrence of Arabia LP (1963?)
- CLP-5349...Trini Lopez: Trini Lopez LP (1963)
- CLP-5350...Brook Benton/Jessie Belvin: Brook Benton and Jessie Belvin LP (1963)
- CLP-5351...Mason Williams: More Hootenanny LP (1963)
- CLP-5352...Isley Bros./Marvin and Johnny: Isley Bros. and Marvin and Johnny LP (1963)
- CLP-5353...John Lee Hooker: The Great John Lee Hooker LP (1963)
- CLP-5354...Chuck Jackson & Young Jessie: Chuck Jackson & Young Jessie LP (1963)
- CLP-5355...Don Gardner Trio: Featuring Jimmy Smith and Bill Davis LP (1963)
- CLP-5356... Flairs: Flairs Featuring Cornel Gunter, Richard Berry and Young Jessie LP (1963)
- CLP-5357...Dave "Baby" Cortez and Jerry's House Rockers: Dave "Baby" Cortez and Jerry's House Rockers LP (1963)
- CLP-5358...Bobby Blue Bland/Jimmy Soul/Johnny Watson: Bobby Blue Bland, Jimmy Soul and Johnny Watson LP (1963)
- CLP-5359...B.B. King: B.B. King LP (1963)
- CLP-5360...Etta James: Etta James LP (1963)
- CLP-5361...v/a: The Greats! LP (1963?), Dave Brubeck, Paul Desmond, Bobby Correll, Bob Kindle, Frank Blake
- CLP-5362...Little Richard: Sings Freedom Songs LP (1963)
- CLP-5363...Jerry Mulligan: The Great Jerry Mulligan LP (1963)
- CLP-5364...Ray Smith/Pat Cupp: Ray Smith and Pat Cupp LP (1963)
- CLP-5365...?
- CLP-5366...Neil Sedaka and the Tokens and Coins: Neil Sedaka and the Tokens and Coins LP (1963)
- CLP-5367...Ike Turner: Rocks the Blues LP (1963)
- CLP-5368...Del Vikings/Sonnets: Del Vikings and the Sonnets LP (1963)
- CLP-5369...Lightning Hopkins: Lightning Hopkins LP (1963?)
- CLP-5370...Cadets: Cadets LP (1963)
- CLP-5371...Richard Berry & the Dreamers: Richard Berry & the Dreamers LP (1963)
- CLP-5372...The Jacks: Jumpin' with the Jacks LP (1963)
- CLP-5373...The Teen Queens: The Teen Queens LP (1963)
- CLP-5374...Hadda Brooks: Sings and Swings LP (1963)
- CLP-5375...Gene Phillips and the Rockets: Gene Phillips and the Rockets LP (1963)
- CLP-5376...Jimmy Gilmer and the Fireballs and the Sugar Shackers: Jimmy Gilmer and the Fireballs and the Sugar Shackers LP (1963)
- CLP-5377...Jim Helms: 12 String Guitar
- CLP-5378...The Hot Rodders: Big Hot Rod LP (1963)
- CLP-5379...Silver Gate Singers: Ethnic Folk LP (1963?)
- CLP-5380...Billie Holiday and Vivian Fears: Billie Holiday and Vivian Fears LP (1963)
- CLP-5381...Marvin & Johnny: Marvin & Johnny LP (1963)
- CLP-5382...Steve Alaimo: Steve Alaimo LP (1963)
- CLP-5383...Joe Turner and Jimmy Nelson: Joe Turner and Jimmy Nelson LP (1963)
- CLP-5384...Scramblers: Cycle Psychos LP (1963)
- CLP-5385...Jerry Kole/Strokers: Hot Rod Alley LP (1963)
- CLP-5386...v/a: Let's Have a Hootenanny LP (1963?)
- CLP-5387...Jimmy Gilmer and the Fireballs: Sensational LP (1963)
- CLP-5388...Bob Harrington Quartette: Jazz a la Carte LP (1960?)
- CLP-5389...v/a: Let's Have a Hootenanny Vol. II LP (1963?), Scottsville, Squirrel Barkers, Phil Campos and Paul Hansen, The Hootenairs, Paul Sykes, The Silvergate Singers, Billy Sherman
- CLP-5390...?
- CLP-5391...v/a: Let's Have a Hootenanny Vol. 3 LP (1963?)
- CLP-5392...The Blasters: Sounds of the Drags LP (1963)
- CLP-5393...The Deuce Coupes/The Shut Downs: The Deuce Coupes/The Shut Downs LP (1963)
- CLP-5394...The Winners: Checkered Flag LP (1963)
- CLP-5395...Eddie Fisher and the Golden Strings: Tonite with LP (1963?)
- CLP-5396...Eddie Fisher and the Golden Strings: An Evening with Eddie Fisher and the Golden Strings LP (1963?)
- CLP-5397...A Memorial to John F. Kennedy LP (1963)
- CLP-5398...A Memorial to John F. Kennedy LP (1963)
- CLP-5399...B. Brock and the Sultans: Do the Beetle LP (1964)
- CLP-5400...The Dave Clark Five and the Playbacks: The Dave Clark Five and the Playbacks LP (1964)
- CLP-5401...
- CLP-5402...Brook Benton/Jesse Belvin: The Great Jesse Belvin LP (1964)
- CLP-5403...Alex Pulaski & the Polka Dots: Polka
- CLP-5404...Erroll Garner/Maxwell Davis Trio: Mr. Erroll Garner and the Maxwell Davis Trio
- CLP-5405...v/a: Blues Oldies and Goodies LP (1964)
- CLP-5406...Dave Brubeck/Paul Desmond Quartet/Cal Tjader Quartet: At a Perfume Counter/Purple Moon/Jazz Latino LP (1964?)
- CLP-5407...?
- CLP-5408...Sonny Criss: Gerald Wiggins, Erroll Garner, Stan Getz LP (1964?)
- CLP-5409...A Thousand Strings: Golden American Waltzes LP (1964?)
- CLP-5410...?
- CLP-5411...Gerry Mulligan: Chet Baker Chico Hamilton Buddy Collette Gerald Wiggins LP (1964)
- CLP-5412...Nat King Cole & Lester Young: Nat King Cole & Lester Young LP (1964)
- CLP-5413...Continental Jazz Oct.: Modern Jazz Great Vol. 1 LP (1964?)
- CLP-5414...?
- CLP-5415...Stan Getz/Erroll Garner/Sonny Criss/Buddy Collette: Stan Getz/Erroll Garner/Sonny Criss/Buddy Collette LP (1964?)
- CLP-5416...Polynesians: Sweet Leilani
- CLP-5417...Vince Guaraldi and the Conte Candoli All Stars: Vince Guaraldi and the Conte Candoli All Stars LP (1964?)
- CLP-5418...Ray Charles and Jimmy Witherspoon: Mr. Ray Charles with Jimmy Witherspoon LP (1964)
- CLP-5419...?
- CLP-5420...Erroll Garner/Wardell Gray/Barney Kissell/Gerald Wiggins: Jazz
- CLP-5421...?
- CLP-5422...Jonah Jones/Etta Jones: Jonah Jones Swings/Etta Jones Sings LP (1964)
- CLP-5423...Sounds of a Thousand Strings: Play Gypsy Play
- CLP-5424...Wardell Gray/Erroll Garner: Wardell Gray Plus Erroll Garner
- CLP-5425...Continental Jazz Octette: Modern Jazz Greats, Volume 2
- CLP-5426...?
- CLP-5427...v/a: Best of the Oldies and Goodies LP (1964)
- CLP-5428...Studio Group: Viennese Waltz Time
- CLP-5429...?
- CLP-5430...Joe Reagan: Memory of Cowboy Copas
- CLP-5431...The Wear Family: Blue Grass Gospel LP (1964?)
- CLP-5432...Wade Holmes: The Memory of Hawkshaw Hawkins
- CLP-5433...v/a: Country and Western Favorites LP (1964?)
- CLP-5434...Eddie Dean: Sings LP (1958?)
- CLP-5435...Billy Williams & the Westerners: Your Cheatin' Heart LP (19??)
- CLP-5436...The Cavaliers: Smoke Gets in Your Eyes and Other Harmonica Favorites LP (1958?)
- CLP-5437...Gino Costalani: Three Coins in the Fountain
- CLP-5438...George Whiteman: George Whiteman at the Hammond Organ
- CLP-5439...Johnny Cole & the Robert Evans Chorus: Songs of Inspiration LP (1958?)
- CLP-5440...Studio Group: Theme from Goldfinger and Others
- CLP-5441...Louis Martinelli & the Continentals: Arriverderci Roma LP (1958?)
- CLP-5442...The Dixieland Scramblers: Dixieland: I Just Love It LP (196?)
- CLP-5443...v/a: Golden Oldies Country and Western
- CLP-5444...Kentucky Mountain Boys: The Best of Blue Grass Favorites LP (1964?), reissue of *CLP-5346 with different artist name and title, later reissued as Custom CS-1109
- CLP-5445...The Frontiersmen: Country Jamboree LP (1964?)
- CLP-5446...Polynesians: Beautiful Hawaii
- CLP-5447...Barrel Fingers Barry: Beer Barrel Piano LP (1964?)
- CLP-5448...The Ink Spots: If I Didn't Care LP (1964?)
- CLP-5449...Discothèque! LP (1964?), studio band
- CLP-5450...Favorites from Walt Disney's Mary Poppins LP (1964), studio band
- CLP-5451...Buck Davis & the Singing Cowboys: A Hank Williams Tribute LP (1964?)
- CLP-5452...Hollywood Studio Orchestra: Lerner and Lowe Favorites
- CLP-5453...v/a: Engine, Engine Number 9 LP (1964)
- CLP-5454...The Hawaiians: Hawaii Tattoo LP (1964)
- CLP-5455...Don Ayers: Organ Rhapsody
- CLP-5456...George Johnson & The Robert Evans Chorus: Theme From The Greatest Story Ever Told and Other Religious Hymns LP (1964?)
- CLP-5457...v/a: Al Hirt The Dawn Busters & Cotton Candy/The Maxwell Davis Quintet LP (1964?)
- CLP-5458...Trini Lopez/Johnny Tores: Trini Lopez with Johnny Tores LP (1964)
- CLP-5459...Hank Mancini Favorites & Others LP (1964?)
- CLP-5460...Buddy Collette: The Girl from Ipanema, I Left My Heart in San Francisco, Fly Me to the Moon and Other Favorites LP (1964?)
- CLP-5461...Trumpet Virtuosos: Red Roses for a Blue Lady
- CLP-5462...Barrell Fingers Barry: Honky Tonk Piano
- CLP-5463...The Hollywood Studio Orchestra: Rodgers & Hammerstein's Favourites LP (1964)
- CLP-5464...Dixieland Scramblers: The Best of Dixie
- CLP-5465...Square Dance with Calls
- CLP-5466...Alex Pulaski & the Polka Dots: Polka Parade
- CLP-5467...Sterling Blythe: Ring Of Fire—Wolverton Mountain & Other Country and Western Hits LP (1964?)
- CLP-5468...The Johnny Louis Trio: The In Crowd LP (1964)
- CLP-5469...Don Gardner Trio: Featuring Jimmy Smith Plays LP (1964?)
- CLP-5470...Dave Brubeck: Angel Eyes LP (1964)
- CLP-5471...The Mexicali Brass: Whipped Cream LP (1964?)
- CLP-5472...The Polynesians: Beautiful Blue Hawaii LP (1964?)
- CLP-5473...The Dave Clark Five: Chaquita/In Your Heart LP (1964)
- CLP-5474...Shenandoah Strings: Shenandoah
- CLP-5475...Johnny Rivers and Jerry Cole: Johnny Rivers and Jerry Cole LP (1964)
- CLP-5476...The Stingers: Guitars a Go Go LP (1964)
- CLP-5477...Rube Rubin & the Westerners: Kansas City Star & King of the Road and Other Country & Western Hits LP (1964?)
- CLP-5478...Pete Fountain & the Village Scramblers: Jazz LP (1964?)
- CLP-5479...Grand Ole Square Dances with Calls
- CLP-5480...Golden Goodies-Country and Western
- CLP-5481...Trini Lopez: Plays & Sings Only in My Dreams • Rosita and Sinner Man LP (1964?)
- CLP-5482...Barrel Fingers Barry: Beer Garden Piano: Barrel Fingers Barry Swings the Classics
- CLP-5483...Red Rhodes: Guitars Go Country LP (1964)
- CLP-5484...Rex Trailer & the Playboys: Good Old Country Music LP (1964?)
- CLP-5485...Johnny Horton/Texas Slim & His Cowboys: Johnny Horton Sings
- CLP-5486...Jesse Crawford: At the Organ LP (1964?)
- CLP-5487...The Mexicali Brass: A Taste of Honey LP (1964?)
- CLP-5488...Polynesians: Romantic Hawaii
- CLP-5489...Jimmy Dean: Bummin' Around LP (1964)
- CLP-5490...Members of the Glenn Miller Orchestra: In the Miller Mood
- CLP-5491...Chris Christian: Organ Encores
- CLP-5492...The Mexicali Brass: Downtown LP (1964?)
- CLP-5493...John Yankowsky & the Polka Paraders: Polka Dots & Polka Chips
- CLP-5494...Lee James & the Tennessee Wranglers: I Can't Stop Loving You and Other Instrumental Country & Western Hits LP (1964?)
- CLP-5495...Muscrat Ramblers: Dixieland Jubilee
- CLP-5496...Carl Miller & Playboys: I Walk the Line and Other Dobro Guitar Favorites LP (1964)
- CLP-5497...Mexicali Brass: Zorba the Greek
- CLP-5498...Hollywood Studio Orchestra: Theme from Doctor Zhivago
- CLP-5499...Holiday Show Band: Winchester Cathedral
- CLP-5500...Billy Bond: Music of the Wild Wild West
- CLP-5501...Johnny Kilgore & Texas Ramblers: Room Full of Roses and Other Country Guitar Hits LP (1964?)
- CLP-5502...Barrel Fingers Barry: Honky Tonkin' with Barrel Fingers Barry LP (196?)
- CLP-5503...The Mexicali Brass: Michelle LP (196?)
- CLP-5504...?
- CLP-5505...Andy Jones & Plainsmen: No Letter Today
- CLP-5506...The Mexicali Brass: Theme from Thunderball LP (196?)
- CLP-5507...Johnny Mac: The Era of Hank Williams LP (1964?)
- CLP-5508...Dave Dudley/Cass County Boys: Dave Dudley Sings with the Cass County Boys
- CLP-5509...Maxwell Davis: Batman Theme and Other Bat Songs LP (1966?)
- CLP-5510...Johnny Mac: Ballad of the Green Beret
- CLP-5511...Mexicali Brass: What Now My Love
- CLP-5512...Harold Hensley and The Virginia Mountaineers: Orange Blossom Special and Other Hoe Down Fiddle Favorites LP (1965?)
- CLP-5513...Barrel Fingers Barry: Ragtime Piano
- CLP-5514...Billy Hayden: Last Date and Other Country Piano Favorites
- CLP-5515...William Daly: Organ Memories
- CLP-5516...Billy Campbell: Make the World Go Away
- CLP-5517...?
- CLP-5518...Jerry Cole & the Country Boys: Crazy Arms and Other Country & Western Instrumental Favorites
- CLP-5519...Polynesians: Hawaiian Love Songs
- CLP-5520...Red Rhodes: Once a Day LP (1964)
- CLP-5521...Norm Kass: Buckaroo and Other Country and Western Favorites
- CLP-5522...Dominique from the "Singing Nun"
- CLP-5523...Mexicali Brass: The Work Song
- CLP-5524...Mexicali Brass: The Mexicali Brass Go South of the Border
- CLP-5525...A Tribute To Tommy Dorsey LP (1964), studio group
- CLP-5526...Georges Montalba: The Mighty Pipe Organ
- CLP-5527...Let's Dance: A Tribute to Benny Goodman Members Of The Benny Goodman Orchestra (1964)
- CLP-5528...Red Rhodes and The Road Runners: Blue Blue Day LP (196?)
- CLP-5529...Members of Glenn Miller's Orchestra: A String of Pearls: A Tribute to Glenn Miller
- CLP-5530...Harold Hensley & the Virginia Mountaineers: Favorite Hoe Down Fiddle Hits
- CLP-5531...Members of the Charlie Barnet Orchestra: Cherokee: A Tribute To Charlie Barnet
- CLP-5532...More Bar Room Singing
- CLP-5533...Members of the Woody Herman Orchestra: Woodchopper's Ball: A Tribute to Woody Herman
- CLP-5534...
- CLP-5535...?
- CLP-5536...Scotty Howard: None Other Than Me LP (1964)
- CLP-5537...?
- CLP-5538...?
- CLP-5539...?
- CLP-5540...Mexicali Brass: Viva LP (1964?)
- CLP-5541...?
- CLP-5542...Mexicali Brass: Mame & Hello Dolly LP (1964?)
- CLP-5543...?
- CLP-5544...The Mexicali Brass: The Shadow of Your Smile LP (1964?)
- CLP-5545...?
- CLP-5546...?
- CLP-5547...?
- CLP-5548...?
- CLP-5549...The Mountainairs: Good Old Mountain Music LP (1964?)
- CLP-5550...?
- CLP-5551...?
- CLP-5552...?
- CLP-5553...Jerry Cole & The Stingers: Guitars a Go-Go Vol. 2 LP (196?)
- CLP-5554...Harold Hensley & the Virginia Mountaineers: Hoedown Country LP (1964)
- CLP-5555...Red Rhodes: Steel Guitar Rag LP (1964)
- CLP-5556...?
- CLP-5557...?
- CLP-5558...?
- CLP-5559...?
- CLP-5560...Bobby Lowe: I'm Movin' on & Other Country Favorites LP (196?)
- CLP-5561...Hollywood Strings: Hawaii and Other Songs of the Islands
- CLP-5562...?
- CLP-5563...?
- CLP-5564...George Mann, His Group & Orchestra: Born Free LP (196?)
- CLP-5565...Johnnie Lee Wills: The Best of Johnnie Lee Wills LP (1964?)
- CLP-5566...?
- CLP-5567...?
- CLP-5568...?
- CLP-5569...?
- CLP-5570...?
- CLP-5571...?
- CLP-5572...?
- CLP-5573...?
- CLP-5574...?
- CLP-5575...?
- CLP-5576...?
- CLP-5577...?
- CLP-5578...?
- CLP-5579...?
- CLP-5580...?
- CLP-5581...?
- CLP-5582...Foy Willing: C & W Favorites LP (1965)
- CLP-5583...Eddie Dean: Sings Country and Western LP (1965)
- CLP-5584...?
- CLP-5585...?
- CLP-5586...?
- CLP-5587...?
- CLP-5588...?
- CLP-5589...The Firebirds: Light My Fire LP (1967 or 1968)
- CLP-5590...?
- CLP-5591...?
- CLP-5592...The 31 Flavors: Hair LP (1968)
- CLP-5593...?
- CLP-5594...?
- CLP-5595...?
- CLP-5596...?
- CLP-5597...?
- CLP-5598...?
- CLP-5599...?
- CLP-5600...?
- CLP-5601...?
- CLP-5602...?
- CLP-5603...?
- CLP-5604...?
- CLP-5605...?
- CLP-5606...?
- CLP-5607...?
- CLP-5608...?
- CLP-5609...?
- CLP-5610...?
- CLP-5611...Tennesseans: The Nashville Scene LP (1969?)
- CLP-5612...?
- CLP-5613...?
- CLP-5614...?
- CLP-5615...?
- CLP-5616...?
- CLP-5617...?
- CLP-5618...?
- CLP-5619...?
- CLP-5620...?
- CLP-5621...?
- CLP-5622...?
- CLP-5623...?
- CLP-5624...Jimmy Lloyd: Fireball Mail LP (1969?)
- CLP-5625...?
- CLP-5626...?
- CLP-5627...?
- CLP-5628...Fascinating Strings: Theme from Love Story LP (1969)
- CLP-5629...?
- CLP-5630...Etta James: Etta James LP (1969?)
- CLP-5631...?
- CLP-5632...?
- CLP-5633...?
- CLP-5634...?
- CLP-5635...?
- CLP-5636...?
- CLP-5637...?
- CLP-5638...?
- CLP-5639...?
- CLP-5640...?
- CLP-5641...?
- CLP-5642...?
- CLP-5643...?
- CLP-5644...Dave Clark Five: Dave Clark Five LP (1969)
- CMX-300...Rudolph the Red Nosed Reindeer and Other Christmas LP (1961?)
- CMX-800...Ivan Ditmar: Joy to the World LP (196?)
- CMX-1000...The Mexicali Brass: Christmas with The Mexicali Brass LP (196?)

=== Stereo ===
Stereo albums
- CST-1...Johnny Cole & the Robert Evans Chorus: Christmas Carols LP (1958)
- CST-2...Smith Singers: Christmas Carols LP (1961)
- CST-3...Rudolph the Red Nosed Reindeer and Other Christmas Favorites LP (1961)
- CST-4...Fred Kirby: Christmas Favorites LP (1961)
- CST-5...George Jenkins: White Christmas LP (1961?)
- CST-6...Johnny Cole and The Robert Evans Chorus: Merry Christmas LP (1961?)
- CST-7...William Daly Organ & Chimes: Silent Night LP (1961?)
- CST-8...Ivan Ditmar: Joy to the World LP (1961?)
- CST-9...Voices of Christmas: Little Drummer Boy LP (196?)
- CST-10...The Mexicali Brass: Christmas with The Mexicali Brass LP (196?)
- CST-33...The Wear Family: Blue Grass Gospels LP (19??)
- CST-101...Hans Hagan Orchestra: Around the World In 80 Days LP (1957)
- CST-102...The Music Man LP (1958), studio group
- CST-103...Bernie Anders Orchestra: Gigi LP (1958)
- CST-104...Members of the Dorsey Orchestra: A Toast To Tommy and Jimmy Dorsey LP (1957)
- CST-105...Billy Randolph & His High Hatters: Roaring 20's LP (1958) (transparent red vinyl)
- CST-106...Oklahoma! LP (1957), studio cast
- CST-107...My Fair Lady LP (1957), studio cast
- CST-108...Pierre Legendre & Paris International Orchestra: Paris Nite Life LP (1957)
- CST-109...Johnny O'Toole & His "Naughty Naughty Band": The Gay 1990s LP (1958)
- CST-110...Duke Hazlett: Pal Joey LP (1957)
- CST-111...Hans Hagan Orchestra: South Pacific LP (1958)
- CST-112...Gold Record Award Album Volume 1 LP (1959?), studio group
- CST-113...Polynesians: Aloha Hawaii LP (1957)
- CST-114...Gold Record Award Album Volume 2 LP (1959?), studio group
- CST-115...Les Howard Orchestra: In the Miller Mood LP (1958)
- CST-116...Vienna World Pops Symphony: Symphony of the Sea LP (1958)
- CST-117...Buddy Bregman: Symphony of the Golden West LP (1958)
- CST-118...Vienna World Pops Symphony: Symphony of the Blues LP (1958)
- CST-119...Port of Suez: Exotic Music of the Middle East LP (1958), studio group, mostly same as Mohammed El-Sulieman and His Oriental Ensemble: The Music of Port Said LP (Coronet, 1959?), East of Suez LP (Broadway), and Ali Beirut's Orientales: Music of the Near East LP (Pirouette)
- CST-120...The Crazy Guy: Honky Tonk Piano Volume 2 LP (1958)
- CST-121...Members Goodman Orchestra: Salute to Benny Goodman LP (1959)
- CST-122...Johnny Cole and Robert Evans Chorus: Hymns LP (1958)
- CST-123...Members Goodman Orchestra: Tribute to Benny Goodman LP (1959)
- CST-124...College Songs LP (1958), studio group
- CST-125...Hawaiians: Holiday In Hawaii LP (1958)
- CST-126...Louis Martinelli Continentals: Cocktails for Two LP (1959)
- CST-127...William Daly: Organ Rhapsody LP (1959)
- CST-128...Salute to Stan Kenton LP (1959)
- CST-129...Members Goodman Orchestra: A Toast to Benny Goodman LP (1959)
- CST-130...OST: The Moon Is Blue LP (1959)
- CST-131...Maxwell Davis: Tribute to Charlie Barnet LP (1959)
- CST-132...Luiz Jiminez: Fury of the Brave Bulls LP (1958)
- CST-133...Maxwell Davis: Tribute to Woody Herman LP (1959)
- CST-134...Members of the Artie Shaw Orchestra: A Tribute To Artie Shaw LP (1959)
- CST-135...Dave Nogell and Orchestra: Porgy and Bess LP (1959)
- CST-136...Johnny Cross Quartet: Flower Drum Song LP (1959)
- CST-137...Bobby Gil: Prado Mania LP (1959) [Mambo Jambo?]
- CST-138...Ted Nash: Peter Gunn LP (1959)
- CST-139...Maxwell Davis: Compositions of Lionel Hampton and Others LP (1959)
- CST-140...Johnny Cole: Dreams of Italy LP (1959)
- CST-141...Jose Barroso: Jose Barroso Plays Almeida Music LP (1959)
- CST-142...Milt Raskin: Kapu (Forbidden) LP (1959)
- CST-143...Members of the Basie Orchestra: Compositions of Count Basie and Others LP (1959)
- CST-144...Ink Spots: Greatest Hits LP (1959)
- CST-145...A Tribute to George M. Cohan LP (1959), studio group
- CST-146...Charlie Barnet: Presents a Tribute To Harry James LP (1959)
- CST-147...B.B. King and His Orchestra: B.B. King Wails LP (1959)
- CST-148...A Thousand Strings: Your Invitation to Stereo LP (1959)
- CST-149...Igor Kousevsky: Tchaikovsky Concerto No. 1 LP (1959)
- CST-150...Sing Along LP (1959), studio group
- CST-151...The Mighty Pipe Organ LP (1959), studio group
- CST-152...B.B. King: Sings Spirituals LP (1959)
- CST-153...Warsaw Concerto—1812 Overture LP (1959), studio group
- CST-154...A Tribute To Hank Williams LP (1959), studio group
- CST-155...Nearer To God LP (1959), studio group
- CST-156...Glenn Miller Memories LP (1959), studio group
- CST-157...Ravel's Bolero Tchaikovsky's March Slav LP (1959), studio group
- CST-158...Beautiful Viennese Waltzes LP (1959), studio group
- CST-159...Exciting Sounds of the Name Bands LP (1959), studio group
- CST-160...Charlie Barnet: Charlie Barnet Presents a Salute To Harry James LP (1959)
- CST-161...Night In Madrid LP (1959), studio group
- CST-162...Kings of Dixieland: Kings of Dixieland Volume 2 LP (1959)
- CST-163...Blue Hawaii LP (1959), studio group
- CST-164...1000 Strings: Play for Christmas LP (1959)
- CST-165...Johnny Cole & his chorus: Wishing You a Merry Christmas LP (1959)
- CST-166...Tino La Tino & His Orchestra: La Tino Cha Cha Cha LP (1959)
- CST-167...Charlie Barnet: On Stage with Charlie Barnet LP (1959)
- CST-168...The Sound of Music LP (1959), studio group
- CST-169...The Polynesians: Polynesia LP (1959), reissued as Chango and the Polynesians: Polynesian Percussion (Premier/Directional Sound, DS 5012, 1961)
- CST-170...New World Symphony LP (1959), studio group
- CST-171...Manuel Rivera and His Orchestra: Dance Tempo Cha Cha Cha LP (1959)
- CST-172...Kings of Dixieland: Kings of Dixieland Volume 3 LP (1959)
- CST-173...Exciting Sounds of the Name Bands Volume 2 LP (1959), studio group
- CST-174...George Liberace: Dine and Dance LP (1959)
- CST-175...Ink Spots: Ink Spots LP (1959)
- CST-176...Dave Bacal: The Latin Touch of Dave Bacal LP (1960)
- CST-177...The Grand Canyon Suite LP (1960), studio group
- CST-178...Can Can LP (1960), studio group
- CST-179...Beethoven's Fifth Symphony LP (1960), studio group
- CST-180...Heart of Spain LP (1960), studio group
- CST-181...George Liberace: George Liberace Goes Latin..... LP (1960)
- CST-182...I Remember Paris LP (1960), studio group
- CST-183...Maxwell Davis & B.B. King: Compositions of Duke Ellington and Others LP (1960)
- CST-184...Schubert: Unfinished Symphony, Symphony #3 LP (1960), studio group
- CST-185...Polka Party LP (1960), studio group
- CST-186...Rex Trailer: Country and Western LP (1960)
- CST-187...Latin All Stars: Jazz Heat Bongo Beat LP (1960)
- CST-188...The Crazy Guy: Barrel House Piano LP (1960)
- CST-189...Bizet's Carmen Suite Schumann Manfred Overture LP (1960), studio group
- CST-190...Conte Candoli All Stars: Little Band Big Jazz LP (1960)
- CST-191...Sounds of a Thousand Strings: The Magic of Hawaii LP (1960)
- CST-192...Tito Guererra and His Latin American Orchestra: Arriba LP (1960)
- CST-193...Louis Martinelli and the Continentals: Lamore D'Italia LP (1960)
- CST-194...1000 Strings: Cloud Nine LP (1960)
- CST-195...B.B. King: King of the Blues LP (1960)
- CST-196...Billy Boyd: Twangy Guitars LP (1960)
- CST-197...Louis Martinelli: Latin Twist LP (1960)
- CST-198...Lilie Wollin: Chopin Favorites LP (1960)
- CST-199...Sounds of a Thousand Strings: Music for Big Dame Hunters LP (1960)
- CST-200...Harmonica Hot Shots: Harmonica Favorites LP (1960)
- CST-201...Members of the Tommy Dorsey Orchestra: A Salute to Tommy Dorsey LP (1960)
- CST-202...Gypsy Love Songs LP (1960), studio group
- CST-203...Liberace: Ooh La La LP (1960)
- CST-204...Sterling Blythe: Sings LP (1960)
- CST-205...Woody Herman: New Swingin' Herman Herd LP (1960)
- CST-206...Coleman Hawkins: Coleman Hawkins and His Orchestra LP (1960)
- CST-207...Kings of Dixieland: Kings of Dixieland Volume 4 LP (1960)
- CST-208...Chubby Jackson: Chubby Jackson Discovers Maria Marshall LP (1960)
- CST-209...Latin Hurricane LP (1960), studio group
- CST-210...Swan Lake Ballet LP (1960), studio group
- CST-211...Johnny Williams: A Salute to Hank Williams LP (1960)
- CST-212...Milt Raskin: Exotic Percussion LP (1961), same as CLP-5110 minus two tracks, with title changes
- CST-213...1000 Strings: The Heart of Spain, Vol. 2 LP (1961)
- CST-214...The Polynesians: Beautiful Hawaii LP (1961)
- CST-215...Jimmy Witherspoon: Sings the Blues LP (1961)
- CST-216...Percussion All Stars: Predominant Percussion LP (1961)
- CST-217...The Ink Spots: Sensational Ink Spots LP (1961)
- CST-218...George Liberace: Hawaiian Paradise LP (1961)
- CST-219...Hamburg Philharmonic: Gaite Parisienne LP (1961)
- CST-220...Kings of Dixieland: Kings of Dixieland Volume 5 LP (1961)
- CST-221...Jim Day: Organ Favorites LP (1961)
- CST-222...Drink-a-Long Sing-a-Long Gang LP (1961), studio group
- CST-223...The Polynesians: Hawaii Calling LP (1961)
- CST-224...Coleman Hawkins: The Hawk Sings LP (1961)
- CST-225...Lilie Wollin: Moonlight Sonata LP (1961)
- CST-226...Camp Fire Sing-a-Long Gang LP (1961), studio group
- CST-227...Continental Octette: Modern Jazz Greats LP (1961)
- CST-228...?
- CST-229...(same as CLP-5215)...The Polka Dots: Polka Time LP
- CST-230...Percussion All Stars: Velvet Brass And Percussion LP (1961?)
- CST-231...The Princeton Trio: The Princeton Trio LP (1961?)
- CST-232...?
- CST-233...?
- CST-234...v/a: Modern Jazz Greats Vol. 2 LP (1961)
- CST-235...?
- CST-236...Memories Sounds Of A Thousand Strings LP (1961?)
- CST-237...Billy Randolph & the High Hatters: Roaring 20's LP (1961?)
- CST-238...William Daly: Organ Memories LP (1961?)
- CST-239...?
- CST-240...Tony Allen and The Nite Owls: Rock 'n Roll LP (1961)
- CST-241...?
- CST-242...The Rounders: Square Dance LP (1961)
- CST-243...?
- CST-244...?
- CST-245...?
- CST-246...?
- CST-247...Teddy Reynolds and the Twisters: The Twist LP (1962)
- CST-248...Joe Houston: Doin' the Twist LP (1962?)
- CST-249...?
- CST-250...?
- CST-251...Steve Douglas: Twist with Steve Douglas and the Rebels LP (1962)
- CST-252...Joe Houston: Twisting in Orbit LP (1962?)
- CST-253...?
- CST-254...Steve Douglas and The Rebel Rousers: Popeye Twist and Stomp LP (1962)
- CST-255...Mike Adams and The Red Jackets: Twist Contest LP (1962)
- CST-256...?
- CST-257...?
- CST-258...Eddie Dean: Hillbilly Heaven LP (196?)
- CST-259...?
- CST-260...?
- CST-261...?
- CST-262...?
- CST-263...?
- CST-264...Doye O'Dell: Country Time LP (1962)
- CST-265...The Polynesians: Lovely Hawaii (1962)
- CST-266...The Frontiersmen: Country Jamboree LP (1962)
- CST-267...Raul Esquivel Orchestra: Beautiful Tangos LP (1962)
- CST-268...Kay Starr And the Gerald Wiggins Trio: Kay Starr And the Gerald Wiggins Trio LP (1962)
- CST-269...?
- CST-270...Chris Christian: Organ Encores LP (1962)
- CST-271...The Polynesians: Hawaiian Paradise LP (1962?)
- CST-272...?
- CST-273...?
- CST-274...?
- CST-275...Erroll Garner: Erroll Garner and The Maxwell Davis Trio LP (1962?)
- CST-276...?
- CST-277...Bill Riley: Harmonica and the Blues LP (1962?)
- CST-278...Wardell Gray: Way Out Wardell LP (1962)
- CST-279...The Sundowners: Folk Songs LP (1962?)
- CST-280...?
- CST-281...?
- CST-282...?
- CST-283...?
- CST-284...Erroll Garner, Stan Getz, Sonny Criss, Buddy Collette & many others : groovin 'high LP (1962)
- CST-285...?
- CST-286...B.B. King: Easy Listening Blues LP (1962)
- CST-287...Roosevelt Sykes: Roosevelt Sykes Sings the Blues LP (1963)
- CST-288...Paul Desmond Quartet, Cal Tjader: Dave Brubeck Quartet LP (1963)
- CST-289...v/a: Gerry Mulligan—Chet Baker—Buddy Collette—Gerald Wiggins—Chico Hamilton LP (1963)
- CST-290...Johnny Horton with Billy Barton and Don Hugges: Country Style LP (1963?)
- CST-291...Jimmy Dean LP (1963)
- CST-292...v/a: Sonny Criss Gerald Wiggins Erroll Garner Stan Getz LP (1963?)
- CST-293...?
- CST-294...v/a: King Curtis, Etta James, Jessie Belvin and Others LP (1963)
- CST-295...?
- CST-296...?
- CST-297...?
- CST-298...?
- CST-299...?
- CST-300...?
- CST-301...?
- CST-302...v/a: Bossa Nova LP (1963?), Buddy Collette, Howard Roberts, Jim Helms, Mel Pollan, Leo Acosta, Darias
- CST-303...Ray Charles and Jimmy Witherspoon: Ray Charles Meets Jimmy Witherspoon LP (1963)
- CST-304...?
- CST-305...Lester Young: Nat "King: Cole Meets Lester Young LP (1963)
- CST-306...Foy Willing and the Riders: Cool Water LP (1963)
- CST-307...Marvin Rainwater: Marvin Rainwater LP (1963)
- CST-308...Jimmy Dean: The Fabulous Jimmy Dean with Billy Cotton and The Western Gentlemen LP (1963)
- CST-309...B.B. King: Blues in My Heart LP (1963)
- CST-310...Chico Hamilton and Paul Horn: Chico Hamilton with Paul Horn LP (1963)
- CST-311...Bud Shank: With Maynard Ferguson—Stu Williamson and Bob Enevoldson LP (1963)
- CST-312...Mike Adams and the Red Jackets: Surfers Beat LP (1963)
- CST-313...Joe Houston: Surf Rockin' LP (1963)
- CST-314...Don Dailey: Surf Stompin' LP (1963)
- CST-315...Alex Keack: For Surfers Only LP (1963?), aka Surfers Paradise
- CST-316...Cleopatra Music Conducted by William Rodgers
- CST-317...?
- CST-318...?
- CST-319...?
- CST-320...Doye O'Dell: Country Time LP (1963?)
- CST-321...Al Terry and Johnny Tyler: Al Terry and Johnny Tyler LP (1963)
- CST-322...?
- CST-323...Tommy Roe and Bobby Lee LP (1963)
- CST-324...?
- CST-325... Sonny James: Country Style LP (1963)
- CST-326...Phil Campos: Famous Folk Songs
- CST-327...?
- CST-328...?
- CST-329...Jimmy Newman and Billy Carson: Guest Star of the Grand Ole Opry LP (1963)
- CST-330...?
- CST-331...?
- CST-332...?
- CST-333...?
- CST-334...Casey Clark & Evelyn Harlene: In Memorial to Lonnie Baron LP (1963)
- CST-335...?
- CST-336...Ritchie Valens and Jerry Kole: Ritchie Valens and Jerry Kole LP (1963)
- CST-337...?
- CST-338...?
- CST-339...Pearl Bailey and Sylvia Lynn: Pearl Bailey and Sylvia Lynn LP (1963?)
- CST-340...Wade Holmes: Tribute to Hawkshaw Hawkins LP (1963)
- CST-341...Chico Hamilton: The Great Chico Hamilton Featuring Paul Horn (1963)
- CST-342...Holly Lane: A Tribute to Grand Ole Opry Star Patsy Cline LP (1963?)
- CST-343...Vic Damone and Johnny Cole: Vic Damone and Johnny Cole LP (1963)
- CST-344...?
- CST-345...?
- CST-346...The Scottsville Squirrel Barkers: Bluegrass Favorites LP (1963), reissued as CCLP-5444 and Custom CS-1109
- CST-347...?
- CST-348...John Foster: Theme from Lawrence of Arabia LP (1963?)
- CST-349...v/a: Mel Tormé with Robert and Caesar Romero LP (1963?), Mel Tormé, Robert Alda, Caesar Romero
- CST-350...Brook Benton and Jessie Belvin
- CST-351...?
- CST-352...Isley Bros./Marvin and Johnny: Isley Bros. and Marvin and Johnny LP (1963)
- CST-353...John Lee Hooker: The Great John Lee Hooker LP (1963)
- CST-354...Chuck Jackson & Young Jessie: Chuck Jackson & Young Jessie LP (1963)
- CST-355...Don Gardner Trio: The Don Gardner Trio featuring Jimmy Smith and Bill Davis LP (1963)
- CST-356...Flairs: Flairs Featuring Cornel Gunter, Richard Berry and Young Jessie LP (1963)
- CST-357...Dave "Baby" Cortez and Jerry's House Rockers: Dave "Baby" Cortez and Jerry's House Rockers LP (1966)
- CST-358...?
- CST-359...?
- CST-360...?
- CST-361...Dave Brubek: The Greats!!! LP (1966?)
- CST-362...Little Richard: Sings Freedom Songs LP (1966?)
- CST-363...Jerry Mulligan: The Great Jerry Mulligan LP (1963)
- CST-364...?
- CST-365...?
- CST-366...?
- CST-367...?
- CST-368...Del Vikings and the Sonnets: Del Vikings and the Sonnets LP (1963)
- CST-369...Lightning Hopkins: s/t LP (1963?)
- CST-370...Cadets: Cadets LP (1963)
- CST-371...?
- CST-372...?
- CST-373...Teen Queens: Teen Queens LP (1963?)
- CST-374...Hadda Brooks: Hadda Brooks Sings and Swings LP (1963)
- CST-375...Gene Phillips and the Rockers: Gene Phillips and the Rockers LP (1963)
- CST-376...Jimmy Gilmer and the Fireballs and the Sugar Shackers: Jimmy Gilmer and the Fireballs and the Sugar Shackers LP (1963)
- CST-377...Jim Helms: 12 String Guitar LP (1963?)
- CST-378...The Hot Rodders: Big Hot Rod LP (1963?)
- CST-379...?
- CST-380...Billie Holiday and Vivian Fears: Billie Holiday and Vivian Fears LP (1963?)
- CST-381...Marvin & Johnny: Marvin & Johnny LP (1963)
- CST-382...Steve Alaimo: Steve Alaimo LP (1963)
- CST-383...Joe Turner and Jimmy Nelson: Joe Turner and Jimmy Nelson LP (1963)
- CST-384...The Scramblers: Cycle Psychos LP (1963?)
- CST 385...Jerry Cole and the Strokers: Hot Rod Alley LP (1963)
- CST-386...?
- CST-387...Jimmy Gilmer and the Fireballs: Sensational LP (1963)
- CST-388...Bob Harrington Quartette: Jazz a la Carte LP (1960?)
- CST-389...?
- CST-390...Old Cherry Creek Singers: Washington Square and Other Hootenany Songs LP (1963?)
- CST-391...Let's Have a Hootenany Vol. III LP (1963?)
- CST-392...The Blasters: Sounds of the Drags LP (1963?)
- CST-393...The Deuce Coupes: The Shut Downs LP (1963)
- CST-394...The Winners: Checkered Flag LP (1963)
- CST-395...Eddie Fisher and the Golden Strings: Tonight with Eddie Fisher and the Golden Strings LP (1963?)
- CST-396...Eddie Fisher and the Golden Strings: An Evening with Eddie Fisher and the Golden Strings LP (1963?)
- CST-397...?
- CST-398...?
- CST-399...B. Brock and the Sultans: Do the Beetle LP (1964)
- CST-400...?
- CST-401...?
- CST-402...Brook Benton & Jesse Belvin: Brook Benton & Jesse Belvin LP (1964)
- CST-403...?
- CST-404...?
- CST-405...?
- CST-406...v/a: Dave Brubeck, Paul Desmond Quartet, Cal Tjader Quartet LP (1964?)
- CST-407...?
- CST-408...?
- CST-409...?
- CST-410...?
- CST-411...Jerry Mulligan: Jerry Mulligan LP (1964)
- CST-412...Nat King Cole & Lester Young: Collector's Item Nat Cole Plays Piano with Lester Young LP (1964)
- CST-413...?
- CST-414...?
- CST-415...?
- CST-416...?
- CST-417...?
- CST-418...Ray Charles and Jimmy Witherspoon: Mr. Ray Charles with Jimmy Witherspoon LP (1964)
- CST-419...?
- CST-420...?
- CST-421...?
- CST-422...Jonah Jones/Etta Jones: Jonah Jones Swings and Etta Jones Sings LP (1964)
- CST-423...?
- CST-424...Wardell Gray plus Erroll Garner
- CST-425...?
- CST-426...?
- CST-427...v/a: Best of the Oldies and Goodies LP (1964)
- CST-428...?
- CST-429...?
- CST-430...Joe Reagan: Memory of Cowboy Copas LP (1964?)
- CST-431...Wear Family: Blue Grass Gospel LP (1964?)
- CST-432...Wade Holmes: Memory of Hawkshaw Hawkins LP (1964)
- CST-433...v/a: C&W Favorites LP (1964)
- CST-434...Eddie Dean: Sings LP (1964?)
- CST-435... Billy Williams & Westerners: Your Cheatin' Heart LP (1964?)
- CST-436...?
- CST-437...?
- CST-438... George Whiteman: At the Hammond Organ LP (1964?)
- CST-439...?
- CST-440...?
- CST-441...?
- CST-442...Dixieland...I Just Love It LP (1964?)
- CST-443...?
- CST-444...Kentucky Mountain Boys: Best of Blue Grass Favorites LP (1964?)
- CST-445...Polynesians: Beautiful Hawaii LP (1964?)
- CST-446...?
- CST-447...?
- CST-448...The Ink Spots: If I Didn't Care LP (1964?)
- CST-449...Discothèque! LP (1964?), studio group
- CST-450...?
- CST-451...?
- CST-452...The Hollywood Studio Orchestra: Lerner & Lowe Favorites LP (1964?)
- CST-453...Engine, Engine Number 9 -- Dang Me and Other Country & Western Favorites LP (1964), studio band
- CST-454...Hawaiians: Hawaii Tattoo LP (1964)
- CST-455...Dan Ayers: Organ Rhapsody LP (196?)
- CST-456...?
- CST-457...Al Hirt: The Dawn Buster LP (196?)
- CST-458...Trini Lopez/Johnny Tores: Plays & Sings LP (1964)
- CST-459...Hank Mancini Favorites & Others LP (1964?)
- CST-460...Buddy Collette: Music For Every Mood LP (1964?)
- CST-461...?
- CST-462...Barrel Fingers Barry: Honky Tonk Piano LP (196?)
- CST-463...Hollywood Studio Orchestra: Rodgers & Hammerstein's Favourites LP (1964)
- CST-464...?
- CST-465...?
- CST-466...?
- CST-467...Sterling Blythe: Ring of Fire LP (1964?)
- CST-468...The Johnny Louis Trio: The In Crowd LP (1964)
- CST-469...Don Gardner Trio Featuring Jimmy Smith: Plays LP (1964?)
- CST-470...Dave Brubeck: Angel Eyes LP (1964)
- CST-471...Mexicali Brass: Whipped Cream & The Lonely Bull LP (196?)
- CST-472...The Polynesians: Beautiful Blue Hawaii LP (1964?)
- CST-473...Dave Clark Five: Chaquita/In Your Heart LP (1964)
- CST-474...?
- CST-475...Johnny Rivers and Jerry Cole: Johnny Rivers and Jerry Cole LP (1964)
- CST-476...The Stingers: Guitars a Go Go LP (1964)
- CST-477...Rube Rubin & the Westerners: Kansas City Star & King of the Road and Other Country & Western Hits LP (1964?)
- CST-478...?
- CST-479...?
- CST-480...v/a: Golden Goodies Country & Western LP (1964?)
- CST-481...?
- CST-482...Barrel Fingers Barry: Swings the Classics LP (196?)
- CST-483...Red Rhodes: Guitars Go Country LP (1964)
- CST-484...?
- CST-485...Johnny Horton: Sings LP (1965?)
- CST-486...Jesse Crawford: At the Organ LP (196?)
- CST-487...The Mexicali Brass: A Taste of Honey LP (196?)
- CST-488...Polynesians: Beautiful Hawaii LP (196?)
- CST-489...Jimmy Dean: Bummin' Around LP (1964)
- CST-490...Members of the Glenn Miller Orchestra: In the Miller Mood LP (1964?)
- CST-491...?
- CST-492...The Mexicali Brass: Downtown LP (1964?)
- CST-493...?
- CST-494...Lee James & Tenn. Wranglers: I Can't Stop Loving You LP (1964)
- CST-495...?
- CST-496...Carl Miller & the Playboys: I Walk the Line and Other Dobro Guitar Favorites LP (1964)
- CST-497...The Mexicali Brass: Zorba the Greek LP (1964?)
- CST-498...Maurice Jarre & Hollywood Studio Orchestra: Theme from Doctor Zhivago and Others LP (196?)
- CST-499...?
- CST-500...Billy Bond: Music of the Wild Wild West LP (1964?)
- CST-501...Johnny Kilgore & Texas Ramblers: Room Full of Roses and Other Country Guitar Hits LP (1964?)
- CST-502...?
- CST-503...The Mexicali Brass: Michelle LP (1964?)
- CST-504...The Bar Room Gang: Bar Room Singing LP (1965)
- CST-505...Andy Jones & The Plainsmen: No Letter Today & Other Country & Western Hits Featuring Country Style Piano (1965)
- CST-506...The Mexicali Brass: Theme from Thunderball LP (1965?)
- CST-507...Johnny Mac: Era of Hank Williams LP (1965?)
- CST-508...Dudley Dave: Dave Dudley & the Cass Co. Boys LP (1965?)
- CST-509...Maxwell Davis: Batman Theme! and Other Bat Songs LP (1965?)
- CST-510...Johnny Mac: Ballad of the Green Beret LP (1965?)
- CST-511...Mexicali Brass: What Now My Love (with Spanish Flea) LP (1965?)
- CST-512...Harold Hensley and The Virginia Mountaineers: Orange Blossom Special and Other Hoe Down Fiddle Favorites LP (1965?)
- CST-513...Barrel Fingers Barry: Ragtime Piano LP (1965?)
- CST-514...?
- CST-515...?
- CST-516...?
- CST-517...?
- CST-518...Jerry Cole and the Country Boys: Crazy Arms and Other Country & Western Instrumental Favorites LP (1964?)
- CST-519...The Polynesians: Hawaiian Love Songs LP (1964?)
- CST-520...Red Rhodes: Once a Day LP (1964)
- CST-521...Norm Kass: Buckaroo LP (1964)
- CST-522...Dominique: From "The Singing Nun" LP (1964?)
- CST-523...Mexicali Brass: The Work Song LP (1964?)
- CST-524...Mexicali Brass: Go South of the Border LP (1964?)
- CST-525...A Tribute to Tommy Dorsey LP (1964), studio group
- CST-526...Georges Montalba: Mighty Pipe Organ LP (1964?)
- CST-527...Members of the Benny Goodman Orchestra: Let's Dance LP (1964?)
- CST-528...Red Rhodes and the Road Runners: Blue Blue Day LP (1964?) [or Fascinating Strings: Theme from Love Story LP (1969)]
- CST-529...A String of Pearls A Tribute to Glenn Miller LP (1964)
- CST-530...Harold Hensley and The Virginia Mountaineers: Favorite Hoe Down Fiddle Hits LP (1964?)
- CST-531...?
- CST-532...More Bar Room Singing LP (1964?), studio group
- CST-533...?
- CST-534...?
- CST-535...The Polynesians: Hawaiian Wedding Song LP (1964?)
- CST-536...Scotty Howard: None Other Than Me LP (1964)
- CST-537...Pete Fountain and The Kings of Dixieland: Pete Fountain and The Kings of Dixieland LP (1964?)
- CST-538...?
- CST-539...?
- CST-540...Mexicali Brass: Viva LP (1964?)
- CST-541...?
- CST-542...Mexicali Brass: Mame & Hello Dolly LP (1964?)
- CST-543...Mexicali Brass: Go Country & Western LP (1964?)
- CST-544...Mexicali Brass: The Shadow of Your Smile LP (1964?)
- CST-545...The Mexicali Brass: Winter Wonderland LP (1964?)
- CST-546...The Mexicali Brass: Theme from the Green Hornet and Other Selections LP (1964?)
- CST-547...?
- CST-548...Lon Harmon: Anytime and Other Country and Western Favorites LP (196?)
- CST-549...The Mountainairs: Good Ole Mountain Music LP (196?)
- CST-550...Lon Harmon: Bouquet of Roses LP (196?)
- CST-551...Johnny Nielson & the Fascinating Strings: Magnificent Waltzses LP (196?)
- CST-552...Johnny Mac: Always Late and Other Country Hits LP (196?)
- CST-553...Jerry Cole & The Stingers: Guitars a Go-Go Vol. 2 LP (1966)
- CST-554...Harold Hensley & the Virginia Mountaineers: Hoedown Country LP (1964)
- CST-555...Red Rhodes: Steel Guitar Rag and Other Country and Western Favorites LP (1963 or 1964)
- CST-556...Barrel Fingers Barry: Barrel House Piano LP (196?)
- CST-557...Johnny Nielson: Music of the Golden West LP (196?)
- CST-558...?
- CST-559...The Heart and Soul of Spain. George Nelson Conducting The Fascinating Strings.
- CST-560...Bobby Lowe: I'm Moving on and Other Country and Western Favorites LP (196?)
- CST-561...?
- CST-562...Lon Harmon: Just A Little Lovin Will Go a Long Way and Other Country and Western Favorites LP (196?)
- CST-563...?
- CST-564...?
- CST-565...Johnnie Lee Wills: The Best of Johnnie Lee Wills LP (1964?)
- CST-566...The Polka Dots: Happy Polka Time LP (1964?)
- CST-567...The Fascinating Strings: Somewhere My Love [Lara's Theme] (196?)
- CST-568...?
- CST-569...?
- CST-570...Xavier Alberto & His Orchestra: Brazil Today LP (1964?)
- CST-571...?
- CST-572...?
- CST-573...George Mann Orchestra Featuring the Golden Trumpet: Music to Watch Girls By LP (1964?)
- CST-574...George Mann Orchestra Featuring the Golden Trumpet: That's Life LP (1964?)
- CST-575...Lilie Wollin: Chopin Favorites LP (1964?)
- CST-576...?
- CST-577...?
- CST-578...Eddie Dean: Sings Little Green Apples LP (196?)
- CST-579...Garn Littledyke: Wichita Lineman LP (196?)
- CST-580...Harold Hensley: Favorite Hoe Down Fiddle Hits LP (196?)
- CST-581...Eddie Dean: Release Me LP (196?)
- CST-582...Foy Willing: C and W Favorites LP (1965)
- CST-583...Foy Willing: C and W Favorites LP (1965)
- CST-584...?
- CST-585...?
- CST-586...The Fascinating Strings: Holiday Moods LP (1966?)
- CST-587...?
- CST-588...The Underground Electrics: Hey Jude LP (1968)
- CST-589...The Firebirds: Light My Fire LP (1967 or 1968)
- CST-590...?
- CST-591...Carolyn Calcote & Mike Frias Sing Selections From Oliver
- CST-592...The 31 Flavors: Hair LP (1968)
- CST-593...Don Lee: True Grit and Other Pop Country Favorites LP (1968?)
- CST-594...?
- CST-595...Leon Copas: Truck Driving Man and Other Truck Driving Favorites LP (196?)
- CST-596...?
- CST-597...Gordon Spence Conducting the Fascinating Strings: Theme from Romeo and Juliet LP (1968?)
- CST-598...The Spinners: Spinning Wheel LP (1968?)
- CST-599...?
- CST-600...Norm Raleigh: Midnight Cowboy LP (1968?)
- CST-601...Bill Lendrum: Try a Little Tenderness LP (1968?)
- CST-602...Bob Currie: Where Have All The Average People Gone LP (1968?)
- CST-603...Don Hughes: Okie from Muskogee LP (1968?)
- CST-604...?
- CST-605...?
- CST-606...?
- CST-607...Bobby Wayne: Big in Vegas LP (1968?)
- CST-608...Lee Akers and the Electric Generation: Heavy, Heavy, Heavy LP (1969)
- CST-609...?
- CST-610...John Travers: Down On The Corner LP (1969?)
- CST-611...Tennesseans: The Nashville Scene LP (1969?)
- CST-612...?
- CST-613...?
- CST-614...Reb Allen: Fightin' Side of Me LP (1969?)
- CST-615...Johnny Mac: Just a Matter of Time LP (1969?)
- CST-616...The Milt Raskin Group: Exotic Sounds of Hawaii LP (1969?)
- CST-617...?
- CST-618...The Electric Firebirds: Dance Party Time LP (1969)
- CST-619...?
- CST-620...Dynamic Brass: Blue Velvet LP (1969?)
- CST-621...Tito Gomez: Latin for Lovers LP (1969?)
- CST-622...?
- CST-623...?
- CST-624...Jimmy Lloyd: Fireball Mail LP (1969?)
- CST-625...?
- CST-626...?
- CST-627...?
- CST-628...?
- CST-629...Toby Rean & The Common People: Outa Space LP (1970?)
- CST-630...?
- CST-631...Beo Wulf: Too Late to Turn Back Now LP (1972)
- CST-632...Jon Travers & Now Country: Play Me LP (1972)
- CST-633...?
- CST-634...?
- CST-635...?
- CST-636...?
- CST-637...?
- CST-638...?
- CST-639...?
- CST-640...?
- CST-641...Neil Sedaka: & the Tokens and Coins LP (1972)
- CST-642...Ray Stevens: s/t? LP (1972)
- CST-643...?
- CST-644...Dave Clark Five: Dave Clark Five LP (1972)

== Other Crown Records ==
- United Kingdom
  - Crown Records was a label made by Polyphon before World War I.
  - Crown Records was a short-lived label in the mid-1920s that was a successor to the 6-inch "Bell" records made by Edison Bell.
  - Crown Records was a label for 9-inch discs sold exclusively in Woolworth stores 1935-1937 through a contract with the Crystalate Manufacturing Company and was related to the Eclipse label.
- United States
  - Crown Records (1930s label) was headquartered in New York City in the mid 20th century.
  - Crown Records, launched and headquartered in Virginia Beach, Virginia in the early 2000s, issues records for the square dance community.
- Japan based Crown Records, also known as Nippon Crown.
- Hong Kong based Crown Records 娛樂唱片, starting in the early 1960s, produces and issues records of Cantonese opera and Cantopop mainly, Mandopop and Hong Kong English pop in few.

== See also ==
- List of record labels
