= Pat Cupp =

- Born: January 21, 1938 (age 88); Nashville, Arkansas, United States
- Genres: Rockabilly; country
- Occupation: Musician
- Instruments: Guitar; vocals
- Years active: Early 1950s–1995
- Labels: RPM; Chance

Pat Cupp (born January 21, 1938) is an American rockabilly guitarist.

== Biography ==
Cupp was born into a musical family in Nashville, Arkansas. His father was a drummer and ukulele player, while his mother played piano, and his siblings also sang. At age five, Cupp began to perform in the family band, accompanying them on guitar or the banjo. In 1951, he was awarded a weekly radio broadcast on KVMA Radio after winning a musical talent show, following in the footsteps of his mother, Ruth, who also was a radio personality. In 1953, Cupp and his family moved to Texarkana where he enrolled at Arkansas High School and teamed up with Elvis Presley-sound-alike Cheesie Nelson to form a locally popular country duo.

During this time, the duo was enlisted by a promoter to perform in replacement for Presley until he managed to arrive for the remainder of the show. Following their performance, Cupp walked backstage, meeting Elvis, and became enamored of rockabilly music. Cupp worked as a solo act, but also toured alongside Carl Perkins and Johnny Cash with Cupp recalling "Carl learned that I was going to do a single act. He came to me and asked if it would be OK if he went on stage with me. He thought I would sound better with some kind of band backing me. I was thrilled by the thought but couldn't believe that one of the headliners of the show would do such a favor. Well, Carl did go out with me as well as Johnny's bass man, Marshall Grant. We did my songs as if we had been together for ever". Afterwards, Cupp formed a more permanent backing band known as Pat Cupp and the Flying Saucers, which included his mother Ruth (piano), J.O. Livsey (drums), Pete Waller (bass guitar), and Johnny Gatlin (lead guitar). In April 1956 Cupp was signed to a recording contract with RPM Records after an appearance on the Louisiana-based television program Louisiana Hayride.

In May 1956, Cupp and the Flying Saucers recorded "Do Me No Wrong" and "Baby Come Back" at KWKH Radio in Shreveport, Louisiana. The songs were released on the group's debut single, which became a regional hit and was followed by an apex of touring. However, for Cupp's second single "Long Gone Daddy" record producers ordered him to record with a R&B group, which consequently performed disappointingly upon release. Frustrated with the change of his style and backing band, Cupp joined the U.S. Air Force in 1957 to avoid further commitments outlined on his recording contract. After being honorably discharged in 1961, performing became a hobby for Cupp as he started a career as a technical engineer and married his high school sweetheart, Loretta Gaye Michael.

Cupp formed a jazz band called the Variables that released one single, "After All", in 1967 on the independent record label, Chance. In October 1995, he performed for the last time at Hemsby, England, before retiring as a consequence of a hearing impairment that had been on-going since 1988.
