= Paul Sykes (singer) =

American singer

- Born: 1937
- Died: 1994 (aged 56–57)
- Genres: Folk
- Occupation: Singer
- Instruments: Vocals, guitar

Paul Sykes (1937–1994), was an American folksinger, best known for live performances in the early 1960s at The Ice House, a folk music club in Pasadena, California, and as a member of folk trio The Randy Sparks Three. He also performed at The Troubadour (Los Angeles).

He was a prize-winning Whippet enthusiast in Coronado, California throughout the 1960s.

== Discography ==
Title	Label	Release
I Wanna Love You Baby, But You Just Don't Treat Me Right / Sweet You	Crown Records	19?? single
Great American Folk Songs	Crown Records	1958 LP
Coffee House (various artists)	Dorian Records	1959 LP
The Randy Sparks Three (as member of trio)	Verve Records	1960 LP
I'm Not Kiddin' Ya'	Horizon Records	1962 LP
Let's Have A Hootenanny vols. 1–3 (various artists)	Crown Records	1963 LP
Hootenanny at the Troubador (various artists)	Horizon Records	1963 LP
Folk Baroque (Mason Williams)	Davon Records	1963 LP
Candy Man	Warner Bros. Records	1965 LP
The Best Thing That Ever Happened To Me / Two-Ten-Six-Eighteen	Warner Bros. Records	1965 single
