= My Kind of Blues (B. B. King album) =

Studio album by B.B. King
- Released: 1960
- Recorded: 1958 or 1960
- Genre: Blues
- Label: Crown

B.B. King chronology
| King of the Blues (1960) | My Kind of Blues (1960) | More B.B. King (1961) |

My Kind of Blues is the seventh studio album by American bluesman B.B. King. According to biographer David McGee, the songs were recorded in 1958 at the Chess Records studios in Chicago. However, researcher Colin Escott identifies the recordings as being from a March 3, 1960, session, when King was under contract to the Bihari brothers and recorded in the Los Angeles area.

The Bihari's budget Crown Records issued the album in 1960. The liner notes contained a blurb about King's "particular form of jazz ... blues-belter extraordinary" and little else. McGee notes that King is backed by a small combo composed of pianist Lloyd Glenn, bassist Ralph Hamilton, and drummer Jessie Sailes (most of King's recordings at the time included a horn section).

Three singles from the album were released by the Bihari's Kent Records; "Walkin' Mr. Bill" reached number 23 on Billboard's Hot R&B Sides chart in October 1960. In 2003, My Kind of Blues was reissued on CD by Ace Records with eight bonus tracks.

== Critical reception ==
Professional ratings
Review scores
| Source | Rating |
|---|---|
| AllMusic | 3/5 stars |
| The Penguin Guide to Blues Recordings | 4/4 stars |

In a review for AllMusic, critic George Bedard called it "a masterpiece: a sparse, uncluttered sound with nothing to mask King's beautiful guitar and voice." The Penguin Guide to Blues Recordings deemed it "one of the great B.B. King albums."

== Track listing ==
The original Crown LP and many reissues do not list the songwriters, producers, nor running times. Details are taken from the AllMusic review and may differ from other sources.

Side one
| No. | Title | Writer(s) | Length |
|---|---|---|---|
| 1. | "You Done Lost Your Good Thing Now" | B.B. King, Joe Josea a.k.a. Joe Bihari | 5:15 |
| 2. | "Mr. Pawnbroker" | King, Jules Taub a.k.a. Jules Bihari | 3:16 |
| 3. | "Understand" | Cecil Gant | 2:39 |
| 4. | "Someday Baby" | Lightnin' Hopkins | 2:54 |
| 5. | "Driving Wheel" | Roosevelt Sykes | 2:52 |

Side two
| No. | Title | Writer(s) | Length |
|---|---|---|---|
| 1. | "Walking Dr. Bill" | Peter J. Clayton a.k.a. Doctor Clayton | 3:41 |
| 2. | "My Own Fault Darling" | King | 3:34 |
| 3. | "Catfish Blues" | Josea, King | 2:29 |
| 4. | "Hold That Train" | Clayton | 3:58 |
| 5. | "Please Set a Date" | Minnie McCoy a.k.a. Memphis Minnie | 2:49 |

== Sources ==
- Escott, Colin (2002). B.B. King: The Vintage Years (Box set booklet). B.B. King. Ace Records. Ace ABOXCD 8.
- Marlo, John (1960). My Kind of Blues (Album notes). B.B. King. Culver City, California: Crown Records. CLP 5188.
- McGee, David (2005). B.B. King: There Is Always One More Time. San Francisco, California: Backbeat Books. ISBN 978-0-87930-843-8.
- Whitburn, Joel (1988). "B.B. King". Top R&B Singles 1942–1988. Menomonee Falls, Wisconsin: Record Research. ISBN 0-89820-068-7.
