= Big John Wrencher =

American blues harmonica player and singer (1923–1977)

- Also known as: One Arm John
- Born: John Thomas Wrencher; February 12, 1923; Sunflower, Mississippi, United States
- Died: July 15, 1977 (aged 54) Clarksdale, Mississippi, United States
- Genre: Blues
- Instruments: Vocals, harmonica
- Years active: 1940s–1977

Big John Wrencher (February 12, 1923 – July 15, 1977), also known as One Arm John, was an American blues harmonica player and singer, well known for playing at the Maxwell Street Market in Chicago in the 1960s. He toured Europe in the 1970s.

== Biography ==
John Thomas Wrencher was born in Sunflower, Mississippi, United States. He became interested in music as a child and taught himself to play the harmonica at an early age. Beginning in the early 1940s, he worked as an itinerant musician in Tennessee, Missouri, Indiana, and Illinois. By the mid-1940s he had arrived in Chicago and was playing on Maxwell Street and at house parties with Jimmy Rogers, Claude "Blue Smitty" Smith and John Henry Barbee. In the 1950s he moved to Detroit, where he worked with the singer and guitarist Baby Boy Warren and formed his own trio, which performed in the Detroit area and in Clarksdale, Mississippi.

In 1958 Wrencher lost his left arm as a result of a car accident outside Memphis, Tennessee. By the early 1960s he had settled in Chicago, where he became a fixture on Maxwell Street Market, in particular playing from 10 a.m. to 3 p.m. on Sundays. In 1964 he appeared in a documentary film about Maxwell Street, entitled And This Is Free; performances by Wrencher recorded in the process of making the film were eventually included on a three-CD set, And This Is Maxwell Street. During the 1960s he recorded for the Testament label backing Robert Nighthawk and as part of the Chicago String Band. In 1969 he recorded for Barrelhouse Records, backed by the guitarist Little Buddy Thomas and the drummer Playboy Vinson, who formed his Maxwell Street band at that time. The resulting album, Maxwell Street Alley Blues, was described as "superlative in every regard" by Cub Koda, writing for AllMusic. Wrencher toured Europe with the Chicago Blues Festival in 1973 and with the American Blues Legends in 1974. On the latter tour he recorded an album in London for Big Bear Records, backed by the guitarist Eddie Taylor and his band.

During a trip to Mississippi to visit his family in July 1977, Wrencher died suddenly of a heart attack in Wade Walton's barbershop in Clarksdale, Mississippi.

== Discography ==
Big John Wrencher discography
- Studio albums: 2
- Compilation albums: 1
- Collaboration albums: 3
- Albums recorded as sideman: 5
- Anthologies: 9

=== Albums recorded as leader ===
Album	Album details
Maxwell Street Alley Blues	Recorded September 14, 15, 19, 1969, Chicago; released 1969 (Barrelhouse Records, LP, CD)
Big John's Boogie	Recorded February–April 1974, London; released 1975 (Big Bear Records, LP, CD)

=== Collaboration albums ===
Album	Album details
Modern Chicago Blues	Recorded October 14, 1964, Chicago; released 1964 (Testament Records, LP, CD)
The Chicago String Band	Recorded June 18, 1966, Chicago; released 1970 (Testament Records, LP, CD)
The American Blues Legends '74	Recorded February–March 1974, London; released 1974 (Big Bear Records, LP, CD)

=== Albums recorded as sideman ===
Album	Album details
Blues All Around My Bed, Blues Scene USA, vol. 3	Johnny Young, various artists, recorded 1964, Chicago; released 1964 (Storyville Records, LP)
Masters of Modern Blues, vol. 4	Robert Nighthawk and Houston Stackhouse, recorded October 14, 1964, Chicago; released 1994 (Testament Records, LP, CD)
Johnny Young & His Friends	Johnny Young, recorded 1964, Chicago; released 1975 (Testament Records, LP, CD)
Mean & Evil Blues	Joe Carter and his Chicago Broomdusters, recorded October–November 1975, Chicago; released 1976 (Barrelhouse Records, LP, CD)
Original Chicago Blues	Joe Carter & Kansas City Red, released 1982 (JSP Records, LP, CD)

=== Compilations ===
Album	Album details
Don't Worry 'bout the Bear	Released 2002 (Sanctuary Records, CD)

=== Anthologies ===
Album	Album details
Harpin' on It: An Anthology of Harmonica Blues	Recorded September 14, 15, 19, 1969, Chicago; released 1983 (JSP Records, LP)
A Taste of Harp	Released 198? (Moonshine Blues, LP)
Low Blows: An Anthology of Chicago Harmonica Blues	Recorded 1975–1980; released 1988 (Rooster Blues, LP, CD)
Bottleneck Blues	Recorded October 14, 1964, and June 18, 1966, Chicago; released 1995 (Testament Records, CD)
Testament Records Sampler	Released 1995 (Testament Records, CD)
Down Home Harp	Recorded June 18, 1966, Chicago; released 1998 (Testament Records, CD)
And This Is Maxwell Street	Recorded 1966, Chicago; released 1999 (Rooster Blues, CD)
Blowing the Blues: A History of Blues Harmonica 1926–2002	Released 2003 (Sanctuary Records, CD)
Chicago Downhome Harmonica, vol. 1	Released 2011 (Ol Chicago Records, CD)
