= Good Luck Man =

Studio album by Carey Bell
- Released: 1997
- Recorded: 1997
- Studio: Streeterville Studios, Chicago
- Genre: Blues
- Length: 58:57
- Label: Alligator; ALCD 4854
- Producer: Carey Bell, Bruce Iglauer, Scott Dirks, Steve Jacobs

Carey Bell chronology
Deep Down (1995)	Good Luck Man (1997)	Second Nature (2004)

Good Luck Man is an album by the American blues musician Carey Bell, recorded in Chicago in 1997 and released by the Alligator label.

== Reception ==
Professional ratings
Review scores
Source	Rating
AllMusic	3/5 stars
The Penguin Guide to Blues Recordings	3/4 stars

AllMusic reviewer Scott Yanow stated: "Carey Bell is an effective and surprisingly versatile singer but it is his powerful harmonica that really stands out. ... His longtime guitarist Steve Jacobs offers some concise and stinging comments but the leader is virtually the whole show on his CD, which finds him leading a tight six-piece group. Nothing too unusual occurs but the music definitely has plenty of spirit". The Penguin Guide to Blues Recordings wrote: "Bell continues to sing and play well enough ... but the spark is intermittent ... The presence of lead guitarist Jacobs is a definite drawback, his crashingly inappropriate solos destroying the others' good work".

== Track listing ==
All compositions by Carey Bell Harrington except where noted

1. "My Love Strikes Like Lightning" (McKinley Morganfield) − 4:10
2. "Love Her, Don't Shove Her" (Matthew Skoller) − 3:25
3. "Sleeping with the Devil" (Johnny Young) − 3:48
4. "Hard Working Woman" − 4:38
5. "Bell Hop" − 3:42
6. "Bad Habits" (David Brewer) − 4:49
7. "Good Luck Man" (Richard Fleming, Gary Talley) − 5:24
8. "Hard Hearted Woman" (Big Walter Horton) − 3:55
9. "Goin' Back to Mississippi" − 3:42
10. "I'm a Business Man" (Billy Emerson, Willie Dixon) − 3:22
11. "Teardrops" − 7:08
12. "Brand New Deal" − 4:20
13. "Good Lover" − 3:50
14. "Double Cross" − 2:44

== Personnel ==
- Carey Bell − harmonica, vocals
- Steve Jacobs − lead guitar
- Will Crosby − rhythm guitar (tracks 1, 2, 5–7, 11 & 14)
- Johnny "Fingers" Iguana − piano
- Johnny B. Gayden (tracks 1, 2, 5–7, 11 & 14), T. A. James (tracks 3, 4, 8–10, 12 & 13) − bass
- Willie Hayes (tracks 1, 2, 5–7, 11 & 14), Tom Parker (tracks 3, 4, 8–10, 12 & 13) – drums
