= Lovie Lee =

- Born: Edward Lee Watson; March 17, 1909; Chattanooga, Tennessee, United States
- Died: May 23, 1997 (aged 88) Chicago, Illinois, United States
- Genres: Electric blues
- Occupations: Pianist, singer, songwriter
- Instruments: Piano, vocals
- Years active: Early 1950s–1997
- Label: Earwig

Lovie Lee (March 17, 1909 – May 23, 1997) was an American electric blues pianist and singer. He is best known for his work accompanying Muddy Waters. He also recorded a solo album, in 1992. He was the "adoptive stepfather" of the bluesman Carey Bell and thus the "grandfather" of Lurrie Bell.

== Biography ==
He was born Edward Lee Watson in Chattanooga, Tennessee, and grew up in Meridian, Mississippi. He taught himself to play the piano and began performing in various churches and at rodeos and vaudeville shows. He had already acquired the nickname Lovie from a doting aunt. He found part-time employment playing with the Swinging Cats in the early 1950s. The group included Carey Bell, who Lee took under his "fatherly" protection, and together they moved to Chicago, in September 1956. Lee worked during the day in a woodworking factory, and for many years played in the evening in numerous Chicago blues nightclubs, including Porter's Lounge. He was well known around Chicago for his blues piano playing. He later worked as an upholsterer, but he kept together his backing band, the Sensationals.

After he retired from full-time day work, Lee joined Muddy Waters's band in 1979, replacing Pinetop Perkins on the piano. He was recommended to Muddy Waters by George "Mojo" Buford, who had worked with Lee in North Dakota. Lee stayed with the band until Muddy Waters's death, in 1983, and then returned to playing in Chicago clubs.

Lee made some private recordings in 1984 and 1989, and this work plus later contemporary tracks were released as the album Good Candy (1992). His backing musicians for the album included Eddie Taylor, Odie Payne, Carey Bell and Lurrie Bell.

Lee died in Chicago in May 1997.

== Discography ==
- Living Chicago Blues Vol. 3 (1980), Alligator
- Good Candy (1992), Earwig Music Company

== See also ==
- List of electric blues musicians
