= Aron Burton =

American blues musician

- Born: June 15, 1938; Senatobia, Mississippi, U.S.
- Died: February 29, 2016 (aged 77) Chicago, Illinois, U.S.
- Genres: Chicago blues, electric blues
- Occupations: Singer, bass guitarist, songwriter
- Instruments: Vocals, bass guitar
- Years active: Late 1950s–2015
- Labels: Earwig, Delmark, Schubert

Aron Burton (June 15, 1938 – February 29, 2016) was an American electric and Chicago blues singer, bass guitarist and songwriter. In his long career as a sideman with Freddie King, Albert Collins and Junior Wells, he released a number of solo albums, including Good Blues to You (Delmark Records, 1999). His recorded work was nominated four times for a Blues Music Award in the category Blues Instrumentalist—Bass.

== Biography ==
Burton was born on June 15, 1938, in Senatobia, Mississippi. He sang in several local churches and with his cousin founded a singing group, the Victory Travelers. Burton relocated to Chicago, Illinois, in 1955. His musical career commenced the following year, when he played the bass accompanying Freddie King. King purchased Burton's first bass guitar.

Burton served in the United States Army between 1961 and 1965. Upon discharge he found employment playing with Baby Huey & the Babysitters, Junior Wells (with whom Burton toured between 1969 and 1972) and Fenton Robinson. He contributed to recording sessions with George "Wild Child" Butler, Jackie Ross, Andrew "Blueblood" McMahon and Carey Bell (Heartaches and Pain, 1977). He also recorded a solo single, "Garbage Man", released by Cleartone Records.

In 1978, Burton joined his brother, Larry, in Albert Collins's backing band, the Icebreakers, and performed on Collins's Grammy Award–nominated album Ice Pickin'. He also toured with Collins before leaving his ensemble in the early 1980s. In the meantime, he worked as a horticulturist for twenty years in Garfield Park Conservatory, under the auspices of the Chicago Park District. He found further work playing with James Cotton, Johnny Littlejohn and Fenton Robinson (again), before relocating to Europe for a time in the late 1980s. While there, Burton recorded Usual Dangerous Guy, with piano accompaniment by Champion Jack Dupree.

By the early 1990s, Burton had returned to Chicago. Earwig Records issued the compilation album Past, Present, & Future (1993), a collection of recordings made between 1986 and 1993, in Europe and the United States, which established him as a frontman rather than a supporting musician. He appeared at the Chicago Blues Festival in 1994, where he was joined on stage by Liz Mandeville. She also sang on a couple of tracks of Burton's live album, Aron Burton Live (1996), recorded at Buddy Guy's club, Legends. The following year, Burton and his brother played at the Chicago Blues Festival. This led to the album Good Blues to You, released by Delmark Records in 1999.

Burton co-wrote a song recorded by Too Slim and the Taildraggers on the 2000 album King Size Troublemakers.

Aron Burton died in Chicago on February 29, 2016, of heart disease and diabetes.

== Discography ==
=== Albums ===
Year	Title	Record label
1993	Past, Present, & Future	Earwig Records
1996	Aron Burton Live	Earwig Records
1999	Good Blues to You	Delmark Records
2001	The Cologne Sessions	Schubert Records

=== Selected work with other musicians ===
- Lickin' Gravy, George "Wild Child" Butler, 1976
- Heartaches and Pain, Carey Bell (Delmark, 1977 [1994])
- Ice Pickin', Albert Collins, 1978
- High Compression, James Cotton, 1984
- Nightflight, Fenton Robinson, 1984
- Million Dollar $ecret, Valerie Wellington, 1984
- Daddy, When Is Mama Comin' Home, Big Jack Johnson, 1991
- Delta Bluesman, David "Honeyboy" Edwards, 1992
- Boogie My Blues Away, Eddy Clearwater, 1995
- Chicago Blues Session!, Willie Mabon, 1995
- Dream, John Littlejohn, 1995
- You're Gonna Miss Me, Ann Sexton, 1995
- Look at Me, Liz Mandeville, 1996
- Live in Chicago, Big Jack Johnson, 1997
- Cool Blue, Christian Rannenberg, 2000
- Way Things Go, Cleveland Fats, 2006

== See also ==
- List of Chicago blues musicians
- List of electric blues musicians
