= Johnny Drummer =

American Chicago blues/soul blues musician

- Born: Thessex Johns; March 1, 1938 (age 88); Alligator, Mississippi, United States
- Genres: Chicago blues, soul blues
- Occupations: Singer, keyboardist, drummer, harmonica player, songwriter
- Instruments: Keyboards, drums, harmonica, vocals
- Years active: 1960–present
- Label: Earwig
- Website: Johnnydrummermusic.com

Johnny Drummer (born Thessex Johns, March 1, 1938) is an American Chicago blues and soul blues singer, keyboardist, drummer, harmonica player, and songwriter. His stage name came after he saw the film Johnny Guitar, at a time when his chosen instrument was the drums.

Drummer has released three albums.

== Life and career ==
Drummer was born and raised in Alligator, Mississippi, and sang in his church at the age of seven. He visited his mother in Chicago, Illinois, in 1954 and 1955, and joined the U.S. Army the following year. He learned to play the drums during his three-year period of duty. By 1959, he had relocated to Chicago, where he remains to the present.

In 1960, he joined a band containing Lovie Lee and Carey Bell. He later played drums for about a year for Eddie King. After forming his own band, the Starliters, Drummer recorded two tracks, "Lookin' for My Baby" and "I Can't Stop Twisting," for a local record label, Wonderful Records, but they were never released. In 1965, he recorded vocal overdubs on two tracks for Billy "The Kid" Emerson, but these also were not issued. During the 1960s, the Starliters at various times included Sammy Lawhorn and Eddie Shaw. Drummer also played on several of Eddie King's singles, and in 1965 he once played with B.B. King at a concert when King's regular drummer did not arrive. Drummer was reluctantly pressed to sing in his own band, leaving regular drum playing to others.

In 1974, Drummer obtained full-time employment with the Chicago Police Department, where he worked for twenty years. However, he continued to play music in the evenings, having learned the rudiments of harmonica playing from Junior Wells. In the late 1970s, he recorded "The Fire Is Gone" and "I'll Find a Way," which were released as a single by Abco Records. By 1985 he had switched to playing keyboards, and he and his band opened for many musicians, including Denise LaSalle, Z.Z. Hill, Koko Taylor, Tyrone Davis and Willie Mabon.

Drummer's debut album, It's So Nice, was released by Earwig in 1999. The music critic Cub Koda noted, "his knack for a catchy phrases and lyrical hooks coupled with funky grooves and solid instrumental mixes makes this album a real sleeper". His subsequent albums are Unleaded Blues (2001) and Rockin' in the Juke Joint (2007).

== Discography ==
=== Albums ===
Year	Title	Record label
1999	It's So Nice	Earwig
2001	Unleaded Blues	Earwig
2007	Rockin' in the Juke Joint	Earwig

== See also ==
- List of Chicago blues musicians
- List of soul-blues musicians
