= Deep Down (album) =

Studio album by Carey Bell
- Released: 1995
- Recorded: 1995
- Studio: Streeterville Studios, Chicago
- Genre: Blues
- Length: 52:19
- Label: Alligator; ALCD 4828
- Producer: Carey Bell, Bruce Iglauer

Carey Bell chronology
Carey Bell & Spike Ravenswood (1995)	Deep Down (1995)	Good Luck Man (1997)

Deep Down is an album by the American blues musician Carey Bell, recorded in Chicago in 1995 and released by the Alligator label.

== Reception ==
Professional ratings
Review scores
Source	Rating
AllMusic	4.5/5 stars
The Penguin Guide to Blues Recordings	3.5/4 stars

AllMusic reviewer Bill Dahl stated: "More than a quarter century after he cut his debut album, Bell recently made his finest disc to date. Boasting superior material and musicianship and a goosed-up energy level that frequently reaches incendiary heights, the disc captures Bell outdoing himself". The Penguin Guide to Blues Recordings stated that "Bell benefits greatly from a high-quality backing band and a tight production team that curbs his habitual excesses ...It tends to suggest Bell might inherit the Chicago harmonica crown on merit rather than by default".

== Track listing ==
All compositions by Carey Bell except where noted

1. "I Got to Go" (Little Walter) − 3:56
2. "Let Me Stir in Your Pot" − 3:42
3. "When I Get Drunk" (Eddie "Guitar" Burns) − 5:16
4. "Low Down Dirty Shame" − 4:29
5. "Borrow Your Love" − 3:59
6. "Lonesome Stranger" − 4:03
7. "After You" (Sonny Boy Williamson II) − 3:41
8. "I Got a Rich Man's Woman" (L. J. Welch) − 4:43
9. "Jawbreaker" − 2:57
10. "Must I Holler" − 7:00
11. "Tired of Giving You My Love" − 3:49
12. "Easy" (Big Walter Horton) − 4:44

== Personnel ==
- Carey Bell − harmonica, vocals
- Lucky Peterson − piano
- Carl Weathersby, Lurrie Bell − guitar
- Johnny Gayden − bass
- Ray "Killer" Allison – drums
