= Back to the Country (Johnny Shines album) =

Studio album by Johnny Shines
- Released: 1991
- Studio: Loma Ranch
- Genre: Blues
- Label: Blind Pig
- Producer: Edward Chmelewski, Jerry Del Giudice, Johnny Nicholas

Johnny Shines chronology
Hangin' On (1980)	Back to the Country (1991)	Traditional Delta Blues (1991)

Back to the Country is an album by the American musician Johnny Shines, released in 1991. He was accompanied by the harmonica player Snooky Pryor. It was Shines's final studio album. Back to the Country won a W. C. Handy Award for country blues album of the year.

== Production ==
Recorded at Loma Ranch Studios, in Fredericksburg, Texas, the album was produced by Edward Chmelewski, Jerry Del Giudice, and Johnny Nicholas. Due to the effects of a stroke, Shines was unable to play guitar on the album. Nicholas was recruited to play guitar and piano; Kent DuChaine also played guitar. Four of the songs were written by Shines's mentor, Robert Johnson. "Hey Bobba Re Bop" is a version of the Lionel Hampton song.

== Critical reception ==
Professional ratings
Review scores
Source	Rating
AllMusic	3/5 stars
MusicHound Blues: The Essential Album Guide	3.5/5 stars
Orlando Sentinel	5/5 stars
The Penguin Guide to Blues Recordings	3/4 stars
The Philadelphia Inquirer	3/4 stars
(The New) Rolling Stone Album Guide	2/5 stars
The Virgin Encyclopedia of the Blues	3/5 stars

The Houston Chronicle called the album a "down-home selection of gut-bucket Delta blues that makes no apologies for its likeness to Robert Johnson... Shines is in great form, and the music is at once ageless and fresh, too authentic to have to be reinvented." The Washington Post noted that "Pryor's pungent harmonica is another asset, as is John Nicholas's deft guitar work, and except for some mediocre songs, the album's lulls are far and few between." The Pittsburgh Press deemed Back to the Country "raw and powerful." The Orlando Sentinel determined that the pair's "flawed jubilance is uplifting." The Philadelphia Inquirer opined that Shines's "flat, grim delivery on 'Trouble in Mind' gives lie to the lyric's optimism."

AllMusic said that "Shines and Pryor have a nice rapport which shines through despite difficulties—but overall, it's hard not to view this as a nostalgia exercise."

== Track listing ==
No.	Title	Length
1.	"Trouble in Mind"
2.	"Corrina Corrina"
3.	"Cool Driver"
4.	"They're Red Hot"
5.	"Crossroads"
6.	"Lost a Good Woman"
7.	"Evening Sun"
8.	"Peace in Hell"
9.	"Send Your Man to War"
10.	"Come On in My Kitchen"
11.	"Blues Come to Texas"
12.	"Moon Is Rising"
13.	"Hey Bobba Re Bop"
14.	"Terraplane"
15.	"I Make You Happy"
