= The Claudettes =

American blues and rock band

- Origin: Chicago, Illinois, United States
- Genres: Blues, rock, pop
- Years active: 2010–present
- Labels: Yellow Dog Records, Forty Below Records
- Members: Johnny Iguana Zach Verdoorn Rachel Williams Liz Ele
- Past members: Michael Caskey; Berit Ulseth; Matt Torre; Yana Atim; Danny Yost
- Website: https://theclaudettes.com/

The Claudettes is an American blues, rock and pop group, which formed in 2010. They are led by Johnny Iguana, and although the combo has had a changing line-up since its inception, they have released five albums to date. Sixth album Garage Glamour is due in 2026.

== Biography ==
=== Overview ===
In late 2010, Johnny Iguana formed the Claudettes, self-described as a "piano boogie, punk blues, and cabaret" rock and roll outfit, who have had an ever changing line-up, although they have released four albums. Their latest collection, High Times in the Dark, was recorded and issued in the midst of the COVID-19 pandemic in the United States. All the tracks were written by Johnny Iguana, and the album was produced by Ted Hutt.

=== Early years ===
Originally the outfit comprised an instrumental duo of pianist Johnny Iguana and drummer Michael Caskey, playing a lively and boisterous style of piano blues. They were both former members of the rock band Oh My God. They played at a diverse set of venues including Buddy Guy's Legends and at a Staples supply store. In 2013, Yellow Dog Records released their debut album, the wholly instrumental effort, Infernal Piano Plot... Hatched! The pair were augmented by the Nigerian-American singer, Yana Atim, before recording No Hotel (2015), although she only featured singing on a small number of the album's tracks.

Major line-up changes then followed as both Atim and Caskey departed in 2016. Iguana recruited further personnel including Berit Ulseth (vocals), Zach Verdoorn (guitar), and Matt Torre (drums). Verdoorn was another former member of Oh My God. They recorded Pull Closer to Me: Live in the Piano Room, (2017) as a 'live in the studio' LP. It was a digital download release, which encompassed the outfit tackling versions of tracks including Ruby & the Romantics 1963 hit "Our Day Will Come" and the Sundays', "Here's Where the Story Ends." Others covered were Pink Floyd's "Us and Them", Otis Redding's "Sittin' on the Dock of the Bay", plus Verdoorn taking lead vocals on a remake of T. Rex's, "Cosmic Dancer."

=== 2018–present ===
In March 2018, Yellow Dog Records issued Dance Scandal at the Gymnasium!, an album produced by Mark Neill. It showcased the group's movement into full rock and pop styled music, with Ulseth providing the vocals on the pop based material. Further line-up changes ensued with Matt Torre replaced briefly by Danny Yost, before he departed and Michael Caskey rejoined the band. Another change took place as the band signed to Forty Below Records, who released High Times in the Dark in 2020. The album was produced by Ted Hutt. Iguana penned the tracks with Ulseth's vocals in mind. Iguana was quoted as stating, "I've really gotten to know her sweet spots in terms of octave range and what kinds of phrases to accent or avoid". The lyrics for one of the album's tracks, "You Drummers Keep Breaking My Heart", relates to Iguana's career long unfortunate experiences in finding and losing percussionists. Iguana stated "Whether by death, illness or as one lyric says, 'one got sick of me, the other just got sick.' But I thought it was a good idea to have Berit sing as if they’re her past boyfriends, rather than my past bandmates."

The Claudettes continued to work with Hutt and Kevin Killen into 2022 on several single releases, with the anticipation of a new album release in October that year.

On March 17, 2023, the band announced on their website that Berit Ulseth "has moved on to new chapters in life, away from the Claudette' van," and that they will be working with Rachel Williams, "a Chicago singer who already sang in a different band with our bassist Zach Verdoorn."

== Discography ==
=== Albums ===
Year	Title	Record label
2013	Infernal Piano Plot... Hatched!	Spanks-A-Lot Records / Yellow Dog Records
2015	No Hotel	Yellow Dog Records
2018	Dance Scandal at the Gymnasium!	Yellow Dog Records
2020	High Times in the Dark	Forty Below Records
2022	The Claudettes Go Out!	Forty Below Records
2026	Garage Glamour	Pravda Records

=== Live albums ===
Year	Title	Record label
2017	Pull Closer To Me: Live In The Piano Room	Yellow Dog Records

=== Singles ===
Year	Title
2020	"Different Drugs (Song for Bill Hicks)"
2021	"Kept Them in the Dark"
2022	"Time Won't Take Our Times Away"
2022	"Park Bench"
2022	"Exposure"
2023	"Irregulars"
