= Kansas City Red =

American blues drummer and vocalist (1926–1991)

- Born: Arthur Lee Stevenson; May 7, 1926; Drew, Mississippi, United States
- Died: May 7, 1991 (aged 65)
- Genres: Blues
- Occupations: Blues musician, nightclub owner-manager
- Instruments: Vocals, drums
- Years active: 1950s–1991
- Labels: Earwig, JSP, P-Vine

Arthur Lee Stevenson (May 7, 1926 – May 7, 1991), known as Kansas City Red, was an American blues drummer and singer who played a major role in the development of urban blues. He performed and recorded with many notable blues artists, such as David "Honeyboy" Edwards, Robert Nighthawk, Sunnyland Slim, and Walter Horton.

== Biography ==
Stevenson was born in Drew, Mississippi. After he was rejected for military service in 1942, he took a brief trip to Kansas City and became known Kansas City Red. David "Honeyboy" Edwards was his first musical influence. He started following Robert Nighthawk in the early 1940s, and when Nighthawk's drummer was ill and unable to play a gig, Red offered to fill in, even though he had never played drums. He was Nighthawk's drummer until around 1946. Nighthawk recorded Red's song “The Moon Is Rising”. Red became part of Sonny Boy Williamson II's inner circle, playing on the famed King Biscuit radio show in Helena, Arkansas. He had brushes with the law and trouble with women and jealous boyfriends in the South and in California before moving to southern Illinois.

He moved to Chicago in the 1950s and was a regular performer in Chicago blues clubs, playing with Johnny Shines, Walter Horton, Sunnyland Slim, Earl Hooker, Blind John Davis, Johnny "Man" Young, Robert Lockwood, Jr., Eddie Taylor, Floyd Jones, Elmore James, and Easy Baby (Alex Randall), among others. He briefly played with Honeyboy Edwards, and in the 1950s he formed a band with Earl Hooker. He led his own bands, including one in which Jimmy Reed gained some early professional experience. He owned and operated well-known clubs on Chicago's West Side, such as the Boola Boola, the Shangri-La, and the Club Reno.

== Music and performance style ==
Red's music career lasted more than 40 years. The blues reviewer David Whiteis wrote that Red's vulnerable personality likely prevented his career from breaking out of the local circuit. According to Whiteis, Red was known to openly weep when he sang "I Am a Prisoner", a song he wrote about the time he spent in jail in 1980. However, Whiteis stated that Red "played a major role in transforming the blues from a southern tradition to a forward-looking urban form." Whiteis described his drumming style as “one of the most identifiable in Chicago Blues, 'busy and eccentric… punctuated by cymbal crashes" and controlled in with drum rolls. His signature solo, "Freedom Train", was marked by explosive drumming unanticipated in the middle of a slow blues shuffle. Whiteis wrote that Red's "legacy transcend[ed] his musical contributions" by virtue of his owning various clubs, his encouragement of artists and listeners from diverse backgrounds, and his "warm and amiable" style as emcee of his ongoing jam sessions in numerous clubs, including B.L.U.E.S. and the V and J Lounge, which were attended by musicians and fans from throughout Chicago.

In 2014 the Killer Blues Headstone Project placed a headstone foe Arthur Stevenson at Mt. Glenwood Cemetery in Willow Springs, Illinois.

== Discography ==
Album	Artist	Media	Notes
Old Friends Together for the First Time	Kansas City Red, David "Honeyboy" Edwards, Sunnyland Slim, Floyd Jones	Earwig	1981; Kansas City Red is the vocalist on "I’m a Prisoner", "Freedom Train", and "Lightning Struck the Poor House"
Original Chicago Blues	Kansas City Red	P-Vine Records, JSP Records	1982; Kansas City Red is the vocalist on six of the nine tracks, also featuring Eddie Taylor and Joe Carter
Earwig Anniversary Sampler	Various artists	Earwig	1995; Kansas City Red is the vocalist on "Lightnin’ Struck the Poor House"
