= The Action Album! =

Studio album by Oh My God
- Released: 2002
- Genre: Indie rock, pop
- Length: 48:29
- Label: NoVo Records

Oh My God chronology
Well (2001)	The Action Album! (2002)	Interrogations and Confessions (2003)

The Action Album! (also known as Action!) is the second studio album released by Oh My God.

== Reception ==
In a three-star rating for AllMusic, William Ruhlmann said "the band seems to have been listening to a couple of decades' worth of Midwest art rock predecessors ... and in their lyrics they often take a quirky, ironic tone sometimes reminiscent of Steely Dan, that is, when they're not being deliberately obscure". He also noted that the band "is in no danger of reaching a mainstream audience with such work, but there is a more limited audience for the avant-garde that will enjoy it".

David Lilly of Louisville Music News opined that "in a nutty music shell, this is a CD of keyboard-based rock candy for the ears. For the most part, the lyrics seem kind of sketchy to me, but generally speaking, it's a fun record". Dave Cataldi, music director at Franklin Colleges WFCI included the album on his top ten list of best albums for 2002.

== Track listing ==
All tracks by Bill O'Neill.

1. "Action" – 2:02
2. "The Beauty of Servitude" – 2:58
3. "The Weather" – 2:54
4. "Reading Stones" – 3:05
5. "Aura" – 3:09
6. "14" – 3:00
7. "Go, Team" – 3:42
8. "Burn, Burn, Burn" – 2:51
9. "That Fight" – 2:24
10. "The Uptown Lumber" – 3:35
11. "X10" – 6:00
12. "Letter 12/98" – 10:11
13. "Where Are We?" – 2:38

== Personnel ==
- Adam Conway – vocals
- Iguana – organ, vocals
- Bill O'Neill – vocals, bass
- Zach Nold – drums
- Reneé Ruffin – vocals
- Dan Stout – mastering
