= Testament Records =

Testament Records may refer to:

- Testament Records (UK), a classical music record label
- Testament Records (USA), an American roots music record label
