= Interrogations and Confessions =

Studio album by Oh My God
- Released: NoVo – October 7, 2003; Lightyear – October 28, 2003
- Recorded: Smart Studios, Madison, Wisconsin; Gravity Studios, Chicago, Illinois
- Genre: Art rock
- Length: NoVo – 61:41; Lightyear – 61:47
- Label: NoVo Records, Lightyear Entertainment
- Producer: Hillel Frankel, Joey "The Don" Donatello, Doug McBride, Oh My God

Oh My God chronology
The Action Album! (2002)	Interrogations and Confessions (2003)	You're Too Straight to Love Me (2004)

Professional ratings
Review scores
Source	Rating
Allmusic	4/5 stars

Interrogations and Confessions is the third album from the Chicago-based band Oh My God. It was released on October 7, 2003, by NoVo Records and then on October 28 of the same year on the Lightyear Entertainment label, with a slightly altered track listing.

The songs on this album can be considered to have been written in a much more conventional and structured style than on their previous album, The Action Album!

== Track listing ==
All songs by O'Neill/Berkowitz except where noted.

=== NoVo release ===
1. "The Unbearable Pageant" – 3:22
2. "Torture" – 3:09
3. "Pearls of Wisdom" – 3:06
4. "Volatile" – 3:22
5. "February 14th" – 3:32
6. "Funhouse Mirror Mother" – 3:19
7. "Our Loves" – 3:10
8. "Get Steady" – 3:07
9. "..." – 0:55
10. "Shine" (Curt Kirkwood) – 2:44
11. "Rat-Man" – 1:50
12. "The Obligation of Joy" – 5:40
13. "Tom" – 7:16
14. "Rat-Man's Confession" – 17:09

=== Lightyear release ===
1. "Get Steady" – 3:05
2. "The Unbearable Pageant" – 3:22
3. "Pearls of Wisdom" – 3:07
4. "Volatile" – 3:22
5. "February 14th" – 3:32
6. "Funhouse Mirror Mother" – 3:19
7. "Our Loves" – 3:11
8. "Torture" – 3:10
9. "..." – 0:55
10. "Shine" (Curt Kirkwood) – 2:46
11. "The Obligation of Joy" – 5:37
12. "Tom" – 7:16
13. "Rat-Man" – 1:51
14. "Rat-Man's Confession" – 17:13

== Personnel ==
=== Performance ===
==== Oh My God ====
- Billy O'Niell – vocals, bass
- Iguana – organ, piano, background vocals
- Bish – drums

==== Additional musicians ====
Anthony Shaw – background vocals
Paul Knegten – percussion
Mike Hari – saw
Megan Cahill – Rat-Man's temptress
Art Auerbach – "neurons in the earthbrain"
Doug McBride – programming, backwards acoustic guitar, ebow, tambourine, mouth percussion
Noble Hibbs – programming, background vocals
Eric Remshneider – cello
Matt Lewis – trumpet

=== Production ===
Joey Donatello – producer, mixing, engineering
Doug McBride – producer, mixing, engineering
Mike Zirkel – mixing, engineering
Paul Knegten – engineering
Paul Long – engineering
Noble Hibbs – engineering
Mark Berlin – additional assistance
Joshua Cutsinger – additional assistance
Justin Olsen – additional assistance
Todd Ostertag – additional assistance
Al Sammode – additional assistance
Dan Wean – additional assistance
