= Johnny Iguana =

American songwriter

- Born: Brian Berkowitz; New Jersey, U.S.
- Genres: Chicago blues, rock
- Occupations: Musician; singer; songwriter
- Instruments: Piano, keyboards, vocals
- Years active: 1990s–present
- Label: Delmark Records

Brian Berkowitz, known professionally as Johnny Iguana, is an American Chicago blues pianist, singer and songwriter. He has recorded albums with Junior Wells, Carey Bell, Koko Taylor, Lil' Ed Williams, Eddie Shaw, Matthew Skoller, Lurrie Bell, Carey Bell, Oh My God, and the Claudettes among many others.

His own debut as a blues bandleader, Chicago Spectacular!, was issued in August 2020 on Delmark Records.

== Biography ==
He was born in New Jersey, United States. When he was eight years old, the family relocated to Philadelphia, Pennsylvania, where he spent the remainder of his childhood. He took piano lessons along with his mother with the same teacher, although as time progressed his mother's interest petered out. Berkowitz was a willing student until, by the age of 16, his ability was sufficient to play both piano and synthesizer in two local blues and new wave bands. His interest had been heightened a year earlier, when his uncle gave him copies of both Junior Wells, Hoodoo Man Blues, and Jimmy Smith's, Organ Grinder Swing, to listen to. In his late teens, Berkowitz played many times in bars in Philadelphia, often utilising Wells material. By the age of 22, college attendance necessitated a move to New York City, where he balanced education with a job writing book back covers, coupled with more practice in playing his organ. At the age of 23 and, through a contact met at a blues jam session in a mid-town Manhattan bar, Berkowitz introduced himself to his hero Junior Wells. After a live audition at the Harvard Square-based Boston's House of Blues, Wells offered Berkowitz a job as his piano player and, in February 1994, Berkowitz relocated to Chicago, Illinois. He toured with Wells for three years, and Johnny Iguana, as he was now billed, performed on two live albums; the 1997 Grammy-nominated Junior Wells: Live at Buddy Guy's Legends, plus the 2002 release, The Best of Junior Wells: Live Around the World.

Following his departure from Wells band, Johnny Iguana formed a trio, Stevie Lizard & His All Reptile Orchestra. He became a founding member of Oh My God, a cult rock outfit which formed in 1999, and almost lasted a decade, releasing six albums. A couple of short lived bands kept Johnny Iguana in work. During this timespan, he also undertook an East Coast tour backing Otis Rush, which included performing at a festival in New Jersey, along with Carey Bell, Jimmie Vaughan, and Little Milton.

In late 2010, Johnny Iguana formed the Claudettes, a "piano boogie, punk blues, and cabaret" rock and roll outfit, who have had an ever changing line-up, although they have released four albums. Their latest collection, High Times in the Dark, was recorded and issued in the midst of the COVID-19 pandemic in the United States. All the tracks were written by Johnny Iguana, and the album was produced by Ted Hutt. During the same decade, Johnny Iguana played piano for the Chicago Blues: A Living History ensemble, whose other members included Billy Boy Arnold, Billy Branch, Carlos Johnson, John Primer, Lurrie Bell, Kenny "Beedy Eyes" Smith, and Billy Flynn; with occasional guest appearances by Buddy Guy, James Cotton, and Magic Slim. In 2018, Johnny Iguana played on the Chicago Plays the Stones album.

In 2020, Johnny Iguana assembled a number of Chicago blues veterans to assist in his recording of his debut solo album. He wrote four of the eventual track list and reinterpreted eight other songs, mostly written in the heyday of blues. AllMusic noted he "finds a sweet spot between jumping piano R&B and gutbucket blues, placing the rhythm in the forefront and keeping things lively and swinging throughout." Chicago Spectacular! featured Lil' Ed Williams, John Primer, Billy Boy Arnold, Bob Margolin, Matthew Skoller, Billy Flynn, Kenny "Beedy Eyes" Smith, Bill Dickens and Michael Caskey. B.B. King's nephew, Phillip-Michael Scales, supplied the vocals on the Gil Scott-Heron-penned track. Realising that any subsequent tour would mean many of those who appeared on the album would be engaged elsewhere, it led to the invitation given to Scales to ensure some touring continuity.

Johnny Iguana commented on his career so far by stating "In the past, playing the main stage at the Montreux Jazz Festival in 2012 with Chicago Blues: A Living History was a highlight (the whole bill was Bob Dylan, then us). Playing at the Taste of Chicago to 500,000 people with Junior Wells was memorable, too."

In the 2021 Blues Music Awards, he had a nomination in the 'Instrumentalist - Piano (Pinetop Perkins Piano Player)' category, and the 'virtual' ceremony took place on June 6, 2021.

== Discography ==
=== Solo albums ===
- Chicago Spectacular!

Chicago Spectacular!

Studio album by Johhny Iguana
- Released: August 2020
- Genre: Chicago blues
- Length: 38:44
- Label: Delmark Records
- Producer: Larry Skoller

==== Track listing ====
No.	Title	Writer(s)	Length
1.	"44 Blues"	Roosevelt Sykes	3:33
2.	"Hammer and Tickle"	Brian Berkowitz	2:58
3.	"Down in the Bottom"	Willie Dixon	2:37
4.	"You're an Old Lady"	Sonny Boy Williamson II	3:37
5.	"Land of Precisely Three Dances"	Brian Berkowitz	2:50
6.	"Lady Day and John Coltrane"	Gil Scott-Heron	4:00
7.	"Big Easy Women"	Brian Berkowitz	2:07
8.	"Burning Fire"	Otis Spann	4:33
9.	"Shake Your Moneymaker"	Elmore James	2:40
10.	"Motorhome"	Brian Berkowitz	2:52
11.	"Stop Breakin' Down"	Robert Johnson	3:38
12.	"Hot Dog Mama"	Big Bill Broonzy	3:19

=== Selected other recent releases ===
For other output, see Oh My God

Year	Title	Artist	Record label
2015	The Blues is Alright! (live compilation)	Junior Wells	RockBeat Records
2015	Sauvignon	Nick Shaheen	Self released
2015	No Hotel	The Claudettes	Yellow Dog Records
2015	Muddy Waters 100	John Primer	Raisin' Music
2016	Blues Immigrant	Matthew Skoller	Tongue 'N Groove Records
2017	Austin Texas the Rock Opera	Franky and the Band	Round Rock Records
2018	Dance Scandal at the Gymnasium	The Claudettes	Yellow Dog Records
2020	High Times in the Dark	The Claudettes	Forty Below Records
