= Too Slim =

Too Slim may refer to:

- Tim "Too Slim" Langford - Lead singer, lead guitarist, and founding member of American Blues rock band Too Slim and the Taildraggers.
- Fred "Too Slim" LaBour - American Western swing musician.
