= Liz Mandeville =

American singer-songwriter

- Also known as: Liz Mandeville-Greeson
- Genres: Blues, R&B
- Occupations: Blues musician, journalist, songwriter, painter, record label owner, music producer
- Instruments: Vocals, guitar, rubboard
- Years active: 1983–present
- Website: Official website

Liz Mandeville is an American vocalist, songwriter, and Chicago blues musician known for her versatile voice, high-voltage performances, insightful songs, and traditional blues guitar playing. She has written and produced hundreds of original songs, including the songs on her albums. She has received critical acclaim and has toured internationally. She owns the record label Blue Kitty Music.

== Life and career ==
Mandeville grew up in an arts-filled home in a musical family in Wisconsin. Her father sang folk songs and played the guitar, and her mother was a teacher and theater buff. Her father taught her to sing and paint, and she started playing the guitar at age 16. She first played professionally in coffee houses around Wisconsin. She moved to Chicago in 1979 to study theater and started going to Chicago clubs to observe and study singing, playing, and audience responses. During this time she met her future husband (and later ex-husband) Willie Greeson (known as Willie Phillips), who played in the Legendary Blues Band. He introduced her to the Chicago blues and R&B world. She learned from local artists Otis "Big Smokey" Smothers and Kansas City Red at the Chicago club B.L.U.E.S. on Halstead. After a bandleader in a Chicago jazz club tried to publicly humiliate her by accusing her of being a blues singer, she became determined to study music. She graduated with honors from Columbia College with a degree in music. She also studied voice for eight years with baritone Doug Susu-Mago, who taught her to use her voice as an instrument and to regard her presentation as an athletic performance.

Mandeville toured professionally for ten years across the upper Midwest and Canada with the R&B band the Supernaturals. She met bassist Aron Burton in 1994 and started "a longstanding performance relationship" with him that included her "label recording debut." She began performing regularly at Chicago blues clubs and worked with blues artists such as Willie Kent, Maurice John Vaughn, and Michael Coleman. Her first European tour was in 1997, and she continues to tour internationally to critical acclaim, having performed for audiences in South Africa, Belgium, Holland, Germany, Latvia, and Canada. She has been an artist-in-residence at the Chicago blues clubs Kingston Mines, Blue Chicago on Clark, B.L.U.E., Blue Chicago, and Bill's Blues. She formed her own record label, Blue Kitty Music, in 2011.

Blues reviewer Eric Schelkopf wrote that Mandeville is a "true renaissance woman and fervent promoter of the blues." She is a songwriter, singer, guitarist, journalist, and painter. She has "written and produced hundreds of original songs," including all of the songs on her CDs. She is a journalist for the Chicago Blues Guide. She considers visual arts as "food for the soul" and she paints, composes computer art, and makes jewelry.

Mandeville formed her first band in 1983. She has led her own band longer than any other female Chicago musician. She now leads the band Blue Points. She is the only white vocalist who performs regularly at internationally known Chicago blues clubs. She is a regular performer at the Chicago Blues Festival and a member of Chicago Women in the Blues.

== Music and performance style ==
Mandeville has said she was most influenced by Muddy Waters and called Koko Taylor her idol, but it was when she heard Luther Allison singing live that she knew the blues was her genre. Writer Karen Hanson described Mandeville's voice as sultry and wrote that she is a contemporary performer steeped in tradition. A critic for Illinois Blues called Mandeville's songwriting "great" and original. American Blues News reviewer Monica Yasher wrote that Mandeville is "known for her remarkably versatile voice, insightful songs, humorous onstage patter and deeply traditional guitar work" and is also "an accomplished Louisanna washboard player." Earwig Music described Mandeville as "a high voltage performer and a red hot mama."

== Awards and achievements ==
- 2001: Nomination of her second album, Ready to Cheat, for Best Blues CD of the Year 2000 by Chicago Music Awards
- 2003: Nomination of her third album, Back in Love Again, for Best Blues CD of the Year 2002 by Chicago Music Awards
- 2005: Selection as Best Songwriter in the USA by the USA Songwriting Competition for her song "He Left It in His Other Pants"
- 2006: Semi-finalist in the International Songwriting Competition for her composition "Life Sentence of the Blues"
- 2008: NominatIon for Blues Songwriter of the Year by the American Roots Music Association
- 2008: Her fourth CD, Red Top, stayed in the top twenty for twenty-two weeks on the Roots Time Radio charts
- 2010: Her song "Scratch the Kitty" remained number one on the Cashbox Top 20 charts for twenty-two weeks
- 2013: Induction into the Chicago Blues Hall of Fame

== Discography ==
Album	Artist	Label	Notes
Aron Burton Live	Aron Burton	Earwig	1996 - Mandeville recorded on two tracks
Look at Me	Liz Mandeville	Earwig	1996
Red Hot Mamas	Various artists	Blue Chicago	1997 - Mandeville recorded on two tracks: "20% Alcohol" and "What Have I Done Wrong"
Ready to Cheat	Liz Mandeville	Earwig	1999
Back in Love Again	Liz Mandeville	Earwig	2003
Red Top	Liz Mandeville	Earwig	2008 - includes songs noted for double entendre, "Scratch the Kitty" and "Rub My Belly"
Clarksdale	Liz Mandeville	CD Baby, Blue Kitty Music	2012 - Willie "Big Eyes" Smith is on the first track, "Roadside Produce Stand". CD includes tenor saxophonist, Eddie Shaw, is on track 8, "Sweet Potato Pie".
Heart 'O' Chicago	Liz Mandeville	Blue Kitty Music, CD Baby	2014 - features Eddie Shaw, Billy Branch, Joan Gand, Wade Baker, Charlie Love, and Dizzy Bolinski
The Stars Motel	Liz Mandeville	Blue Kitty Music	2016 - includes guest appearances by Rachelle Coba, Scott Ellison and Minoru Maruyama
