= Harmonica Frank =

American blues musician

- Also known as: Shankles Floyd
- Born: Frank Floyd; October 11, 1908; Toccopola, Mississippi, United States
- Died: August 7, 1984 (aged 75) Blanchester, Ohio, United States
- Genres: Blues, country, folk, rockabilly
- Instruments: Harmonica, vocals, guitar
- Years active: 1920s–1970s
- Labels: Chess, Adelphi, Barrelhouse

Frank Floyd, known as Harmonica Frank (October 11, 1908 – August 7, 1984) was an American blues singer, guitarist and harmonicist.

== Biography ==
=== Early life, performing technique ===
Frank Floyd was born in Toccopola, Mississippi, the son of itinerant parents who separated without giving him a name, though he is recorded in the 1910 census as Shankles Floyd. He was raised by his sharecropping grandparents, who died while he was a teenager. He taught himself to play harmonica when he was 10 years old, and he eventually learned guitar. He gave himself the name Frank Floyd, and began performing in the 1920s for traveling carnivals and medicine shows.

He learned many types of folk music and became a mimic, effortlessly switching from humorous hillbilly ballads to deep country blues.

With his self-taught harmonica technique, he was a one-man band, able to play the instrument without his hands or the need for a neck brace. While also playing guitar, he perfected a technique of manipulating the harmonica with his mouth while he sang out of the other side. He could also play harmonica with his nose and thus play two harmonicas at once, a skill he shared with blues harp players Walter Horton and Gus Cannon's partner Noah Lewis.

=== Early recordings ===
After years of performing on the medicine-show circuit, Harmonica Frank began working in radio in 1932. His first records were made in 1951, engineered by Sam Phillips in Memphis, Tennessee. The songs, "Swamp Root", "Goin’ Away Walkin'", "Step It Up and Go", "Howlin’ Tomcat", and "She Done Moved", were licensed to Chess Records. Phillips put out another single on Sun Records, "Rockin' Chair Daddy" / "The Great Medical Menagerist" in 1954. Harmonica Frank thus became one of the first white musicians to record at that studio. Floyd and Larry Kennon released a shared single, "Rock-A-Little Baby" / "Monkey Love" in 1958, on their own record label, F&L.

=== Rediscovery, legacy and death ===
Harmonica Frank's songs appeared on many all-black blues compilations in the 1960s and 1970s, collectors being unable to distinguish his race.

In 1972 he was "rediscovered" by Stephen C. LaVere and in the following years recorded two albums for the Adelphi and Barrelhouse labels, including a compilation of the early material. Additional full albums were recorded before his death in 1984, many of which have become available on CD, though his vintage recordings (1951–59) remain mostly out of print and unavailable aside from occasional tracks on compilations.

In his 1975 book Mystery Train: Images of America in Rock 'n' Roll Music, author Greil Marcus presented a unique vision of America and music, and how they relate by using (as metaphors) six musicians, one of whom was Harmonica Frank.

Frank Floyd died in Blanchester, Ohio, on August 7, 1984, due to complications from Type II diabetes (which had previously cost him his leg) and lung cancer.
