= Barrelhouse =

Barrelhouse or Barrel House may refer to:

- A "juke joint", a bar or saloon. Originates from the storage of barrels of alcohol.
- An early form of jazz with wild, improvised piano, and an accented two-beat rhythm (see Boogie-woogie)
- Barrelhouse Records, a record label
- The London Blues and Barrelhouse Club, a blues club in London founded by Alexis Korner and Cyril Davies
- The Barrelhouse Club, a rhythm and blues nightclub in Los Angeles, co-owned by Johnny Otis
- Barrelhouse Chuck (1958–2016), American Chicago blues musician
- Barrelhouse (band), a Dutch Blues band
