= Mellow Down Easy =

Studio album by Carey Bell
- Released: 1991
- Genre: Blues
- Label: Blind Pig
- Producer: Steve Jacobs, Jerry Del Giudice, Mark Hurwitz

Carey Bell chronology
Dynasty! (1990)	Mellow Down Easy (1991)	Breakdown Blues Live! (1992)

Mellow Down Easy is an album by the American musician Carey Bell, released in 1991. Bell supported it with a North American tour.

== Production ==
The album was produced by Steve Jacobs, Jerry Del Giudice, and Mark Hurwitz. Bell wrote six of its songs. He played a chromatic harmonica and was backed by a Maryland band, Tough Luck. "Short Dress Woman" is a version of the song written by J. T. Brown. "Walkin' Thru the Park" is a cover of the Muddy Waters song; "Delta Time" is a tribute to Waters. The title track was written by Willie Dixon. "Five Long Years" is a cover of the Eddie Boyd standard. "Walkin' by Myself" is a version of the Jimmy Rogers R&B hit. "St. Louis Blues" was composed by W. C. Handy. "Big Walter Strut" is a tribute to Big Walter Horton.

== Critical reception ==
Professional ratings
Review scores
Source	Rating
All Music Guide to the Blues	4/5 stars
Chicago Tribune	3/4 stars
The Encyclopedia of Popular Music	3/5 stars
The Grove Press Guide to the Blues on CD	3.5/5 stars
MusicHound Blues: The Essential Album Guide	3.5/5 stars
Oakland Tribune	3.5/4 stars
The Penguin Guide to Blues Recordings	3.5/4 stars
The Rolling Stone Jazz & Blues Album Guide	3.5/5 stars
St. Petersburg Times	4/5 stars

The Chicago Tribune stated that "'St. Louis Blues' is the high point of this disc, a long, intimate harmonica solo by Chicago master Bell that begins in sensitive theme-and-decorations and moves on to dancing lines." The St. Petersburg Times opined that the album "illustrates a few perfect intersections of Delta blues and Chicago jazz." The Washington Post said, "The only real pleasures to be found are in the resonant tones and fluid runs Bell consistently coaxes from his chromatic harmonica, and the sound of his warm, weathered voice."

The Denver Post noted, "Sometimes, the tone is like a vibrato-laden guitar. Other times, he gets a C&W swing into his sound." The Oakland Tribune praised the "haunting, dark harmonica solos". The Rocket said that Bell's playing "is astounding, and he's a fluid, expressive vocalist." The North County Blade-Citizen listed Mellow Down Easy as the ninth best blues album of 1991; The Ann Arbor News included it in its top five.

== Track listing ==
No.	Title	Length
1.	"Short Dress Woman"
2.	"Delta Time"
3.	"Five Long Years"
4.	"Mellow Down Easy"
5.	"For the Love of a Woman"
6.	"Just Like You"
7.	"Walkin' Thru the Park"
8.	"St. Louis Blues"
9.	"That Spot Right There"
10.	"Big Walter Strut"
11.	"One Day"
12.	"So Easy to Love You"
13.	"Walkin' by Myself"
