= Big Walter Horton with Carey Bell =

Studio album by Big Walter Horton and Carey Bell
- Released: 1972
- Recorded: April 4, 1972
- Studio: Sound Studios, Chicago
- Genre: Blues
- Length: 38:07
- Label: Alligator; 4702
- Producer: Carey Bell, Bruce Iglauer

Big Walter Horton chronology
King of the Harmonica Players (1972)	Big Walter Horton with Carey Bell (1972)	Walter 'Shakey' Horton with Hot Cottage (1972)

Carey Bell chronology
Carey Bell's Blues Harp (1969)	Big Walter Horton with Carey Bell (1972)	Last Night (1973)

Big Walter Horton with Carey Bell is an album by the American blues musicians Big Walter Horton and Carey Bell, recorded in Chicago in 1972 and released by the Alligator label.

== Reception ==
Professional ratings
Review scores
Source	Rating
Allmusic	3/5 stars
The Penguin Guide to Blues Recordings	3.5/4 stars

The Allmusic reviewer, Bill Dahl, wrote, "The teacher/pupil angle might be a bit unwieldy here -- Bell was already a formidable harpist in his own right by 1972, when Horton made this album -- but there's no denying that a stylistic bond existed between the two. A highly showcase for the often recalcitrant harp master, and only his second domestic set as a leader."

== Track listing ==
All compositions by Big Walter Horton except where noted

1. "Have a Good Time" − 3:48
2. "Christine" − 4:03
3. "Lovin' My Baby" − 2:50
4. "Little Boy Blue" − 3:14
5. "Can't Hold Out Much Longer" − 2:52
6. "Under the Sun" − 3:51
7. "Tell Me Baby" − 3:15
8. "Have Mercy" − 3:45
9. "That Ain't It" (James A. Lane) − 2:41
10. "Temptation" − 3:43
11. "Trouble in Mind" (Richard M. Jones) − 4:38

== Personnel ==
- Big Walter Horton − harmonica, vocals
- Carey Bell − second harmonica, bass
- Eddie Taylor − guitar
- Joe Harper − bass
- Frank Swan – drums
