= Too Wet to Plow =

Studio album by Johnny Shines
- Released: 1977
- Genre: Blues
- Label: Blue Labor
- Producer: Holger Petersen

Johnny Shines chronology
| Johnny Shines (1974) | Too Wet to Plow (1977) | Hey Ba-Ba-Re-Bop (1978) |

Too Wet to Plow is an album by the American musician Johnny Shines, released in 1977.

== Production ==
The album was recorded in Edmonton and was produced by Holger Petersen. Sugar Blue played harmonica and Louisiana Red contributed on guitar and harmonica.

== Critical reception ==
Professional ratings
Review scores
| Source | Rating |
|---|---|
| AllMusic | 3/5 stars |
| Robert Christgau | A− |
| MusicHound Blues: The Essential Album Guide | 4/5 stars |
| Omaha World-Herald | 4/5 stars |
| The Penguin Guide to Blues Recordings | 3.5/4 stars |
| (The New) Rolling Stone Album Guide | 4/5 stars |

Greil Marcus, in Rolling Stone, called the album "an unelectrified, completely personal statement that speaks as well for the cutting power of country blues in the late Seventies as Muddy Waters's Hard Again did for that of Chicago blues."

AllMusic wrote that the album "finds Shines in excellent form ... one of the album's high points is an interpretation of Robert Johnson's 'Hot Tamale'." Reviewing a reissue, The Milwaukee Journal praised the "superb" slide guitar, writing that "the country blues here sound great."

== Track listing ==
| No. | Title | Length |
|---|---|---|
| 1. | "Too Wet to Plow" | 4:17 |
| 2. | "Travelling Back Home" | 3:47 |
| 3. | "Hot Tamale" | 3:02 |
| 4. | "Moanin' the Blues" | 4:36 |
| 5. | "Red Sun" | 4:34 |
| 6. | "Winding Mind" | 2:34 |
| 7. | "You Better Turn Around" | 4:20 |
| 8. | "The Wind Is Blowin'" | 3:29 |
| 9. | "Trouble's All I See" | 5:08 |
| 10. | "30 Days in Jail" | 3:37 |
| 11. | "Pay Day Woman" | 4:58 |
| 12. | "Epilog" | 2:14 |

== Personnel ==
- Johnny Shines – vocals, guitar
- Sugar Blue – harmonica
- Louisiana Red – guitar, harmonica
