= Matthew Skoller =

American Chicago blues musician (born 1962)

- Born: August 3, 1962 (age 64); Canton, New York, United States
- Genres: Chicago blues
- Occupations: Harmonicist, singer, songwriter, record producer
- Instruments: Harmonica, vocals
- Years active: 1980s–present

Matthew Skoller (born August 3, 1962) is an American Chicago blues harmonicist, singer, songwriter, and record producer. He has released five albums, as well as recording his harmonica playing on other musicians work, including John Primer, Lurrie Bell, Koko Taylor, H-Bomb Ferguson, Toronzo Cannon, Bernard Allison, Larry Garner, Big Daddy Kinsey, Big Time Sarah, Michael Coleman, and Harvey Mandel. On stage, he has supplied part of the backing to Big Time Sarah, Jimmy Rogers, and Deitra Farr.

The subject matter of his own song writing tackles issues of technology, information, inequality and upheaval. His band members have included guitarists such as Lurrie Bell and Larry Skoller, pianist and organist Sidney James Wingfield, bass player Willie "Vamp" Samuels, and the drummers Kenny "Beedy Eyes" Smith and Heitor Garcia.

== Biography ==
=== Career ===
He was born in Canton, New York, United States. Following a childhood spent in that state, Skoller relocated to Chicago, Illinois, from Brooklyn, New York, in January 1987. He played in the local blues scene, before working with various outfits, including the Chi-Town Hustlers then, a year later, Big Daddy Kinsey and the Kinsey Report. In 1992, he formed his own band and within four years, they gained artist-in-residency at the Disney Institute in Orlando, Florida. Skollar played harmonica on one track of H-Bomb Ferguson's Wiggin' Out (1993). In October 1996, his band won a prize at the International Blues Challenge, which led to Hohner choosing Skoller as an endorsee of their make of harmonica. The same year, the Matthew Skoller Band issued their debut album, Bone to Pick with You. Shoulder to the Wind (2000) was Skoller's sophomore issue, also on Tongue 'N Groove Records. Elsewhere, Skoller provided harmonica work on Knockin' at Your Door, by John Primer (1999), and on Koko Taylor's 2000 release, Royal Blue. His own third album, Taproot, was credited to Matthew Skoller's Lost Trio. The trio consisted of Skoller on harmonica and vocals, his brother Larry on guitar with Johnny Iguana playing the piano. It was released in 2003.

In January 2005, These Kind Of Blues!, appeared and credited by Mojo as one of the Top Ten Blues Albums of that year. The album contained unusual blues fodder such as political musings within "Handful of People," and philosophy on "Let the World Come to You." The latter track incorporated the shakuhachi playing of Brian Ritchie, another atypical inclusion. Lurrie Bell supplied his guitar work on several tracks. Most of the tracks were original songs penned by Skoller, although James Cotton's, "Down at Your Buryin'," was one of three reworked versions of earlier tunes.

In 2007, Skoller moved into record production work for others, helming Lurrie Bell's, Let's Talk About Love. Skoller was again the producer of Bell's next release, The Devil Ain't Got No Music (2012). His tune "The Devil Ain’t Got No Music," from Bell's album of the same name, received a Blues Music Award nomination as 'Song of the Year.' Skoller also contributed to the Grammy Award nominated Chicago Blues: A Living History (2009); and had co-production credits and played on Chicago Blues: A Living History - The (R)evolution Continues (2011). He played on Heritage Blues Orchestra's, And Still I Rise (2012), which was nominated for a Grammy. In the previous year, Skoller had played on Toronzo Cannon's album, Leaving Mood.

Skoller organized, produced and performed in the grand finale of the 2013 Chicago Blues Festival, and recorded the harmonica parts for Lurrie Bell's, Blues in My Soul, album which was recorded in February that year. Skoller figured prominently in Bell's 2016 album, Can't Shake This Feeling, which was nominated for a Grammy Award for Best Traditional Blues Album. The same year, Skoller released his latest album, Blues Immigrant. Although resident in Chicago for nearly 30 years, he felt the album's title was appropriate. Musicians playing on the recording included the pianist, Johnny Iguana, and guitarists, Carlos Johnson and Eddie Taylor Jr. It was produced by Vincent Bucher and Skoller, who jointly wrote nine of the eleven tracks. Skoller lamented about organisations that keep the blues alive by paying low wages, and where children get more media coverage than seasoned musicians, on the track, "Only in the Blues". A version of Luther "Georgia Boy" Johnson's "Get Down to the Nitty Gritty" is one of two tracks written by others.

In 2020, Skoller contributed to Johnny Iguana's debut album, Chicago Spectacular!

=== Other work ===
He composed the music for August Wilson's 1995 Tony Award nominated play, Seven Guitars. Skoller has recorded a number of jingles, primarily for use in television advertisements. In 2015, he contributed to the various artists recording of Muddy Waters 100, an album which was Grammy nominated for Best Blues Album.

Skoller is also the US sales director and co-founder of Family Tradition Cognac.

=== International appearances ===
Over the years he has performed at many venues outside of the United States. Countries in which he has played include Greece, the UK, Belgium, France, Italy, Norway, Spain, Switzerland, Mali, Mauritania, Tunisia, and Cameroon. He graced the Japan Blues Festival in both 2012, and 2013; performed twice at the Residence of the U.S. Ambassador to France in Paris; and played at the Montreux Jazz Festival in 2012.

Closer to home, Skoller and his band have been regular performers at Chicago's nightclub, Buddy Guy's Legends, since the club opened in 1989.

== Discography ==
=== Albums ===
Year of release	Album title	Record label
1996	Bone to Pick with You	Tongue 'N Groove Records
2000	Shoulder to the Wind	Tongue 'N Groove Records
2003	Taproot	Tongue 'N Groove Records
2005	These Kind of Blues!	Tongue 'N Groove Records
2016	Blues Immigrant	Tongue 'N Groove Records

== See also ==
- List of electric blues musicians
- List of Chicago blues musicians
