= George Paulus =

George Paulus (April 23, 1948 in Chicago, Illinois, United States – November 15, 2014 in Downers Grove, Illinois) was an American record producer, plus the founder and owner of Barrelhouse Records, Negro Rhythm Records, and St. George Records.
