= Fools Want Noise! =

Fools Want Noise

Studio album by Oh My God
- Released: 2007
- Genre: Indie rock
- Length: 38:23
- Label: Split Red

Oh My God chronology
You're Too Straight to Love Me (2004)	Fools Want Noise (2007)	The Night Undoes The Work Of The Day (2009)

Fools Want Noise is an album by Oh My God. It was released in 2007 by Split Red Records.

The band employed guitar instrumentation on the album, the first time in its recording career that it had done so.

== Critical reception ==
The Chicago Reader wrote that the band "go over the top of over-the-top: with heavy guitar added to their already comically heavy sound, the stadium-rock bravado of the arrangements would now make Freddie Mercury blush ... the key, though, is their underlying sincerity."

Illinois Entertainer wrote that "from power pop bliss ('Two-Hand Touch') to punk aggression (title track) and bombastic hard rock ('Facewash') to psychedelic flirting ('Ancient Sanskrit Proverb (The Splendor Of Beauty)'), [Oh My God] never stick around long enough to set stakes in any one style."

== Track listing ==
1. "Houston (Now You've Got A Problem)" - 3:42
2. "Facewash" - 2:16
3. "Fly A Kite" - 2:34
4. "(Fools Want Introductions)" - 0:33
5. "Fools Want Noise" - 2:33
6. "(The Fools)" - 0:20
7. "Better Than That" - 3:13
8. "But That's Just Me" - 3:42
9. "Put It In A Song" - 3:46
10. "(Untitled)" - 0:31
11. "Get Out To Sea" - 3:42
12. "Two-Hand Touch" - 3:26
13. "(Untitled)" - 0:23
14. "Everything is Good" - 3:43
15. "(Untitled)" - 0:27
16. "Ancient Sanskrit Proverb" - 3:32
