= Barrelhouse Records =

Music label

- Founded: 1974
- Founder: George Paulus
- Status: Defunct
- Genre: Blues and Rockabilly

Barrelhouse Records was an American blues and rockabilly record label, set up by George Paulus in 1974.

== Roster of musicians ==
Its roster included musicians as varied as Washboard Willie, Big John Wrencher, Charlie Feathers, Harmonica Frank, Sleepy John Estes, Johnny "Man" Young, Blind Joe Hill, Joe Carter, Billy Branch, Jimmy Rogers, Earl Hooker, Calvin Frazier, Robert Richard, Marcus Van Story, Easy Baby, 'Lyin' Joe Holley, and the Chicago Slim Blues Band.

== See also ==
- List of blues musicians
- List of record labels
- List of rockabilly musicians
