= The Night Undoes the Work of the Day =

The Night Undoes The Work Of The Day

Studio album by Oh My God
- Released: 2009
- Studio: Butcher Boy, Chicago, IL Ig's Basement, Chicago, IL Matt lenny's Studio, New York, NY
- Genre: Indie rock
- Length: 36:06
- Label: Split Red
- Producer: Jim Tullio

Oh My God chronology
Fools Want Noise! (2007)	The Night Undoes The Work Of The Day (2009)

The Night Undoes The Work Of The Day is the sixth Oh My God studio album, and the second to be released by Split Red Records. The title is a quote from the 1951 film Diary of a Country Priest.

== Track listing ==
1. My Own Adventure - 3:39
2. My Prayer - 3:15
3. Bring Yourself - 3:22
4. Baby There's Nothin' Wrong (You Just Gotta Go To Work) - 2:17
5. I Don't Think It's Funny (How Time Slips Away) - 4:20
6. One Thing Leads To Another - 2:52
7. Baby, Dream - 3:45
8. My Juliet - 3:33
9. I Dare You To Love Me - 2:44
10. Strangers On A Train - 6:19
