= Rockin' Chair Daddy =

Song by Braxton Shuffered aka Braxton Shooford
- Released: 1951
- Recorded: June 1, 1951
- Genre: Country
- Length: 3:02
- Songwriters: Hank Williams, Braxton Shuffert

"Rockin' Chair Daddy" is a honky tonk country song written and recorded by Braxton Shuffert. Hank Williams was the co-writer.

== Background ==
After the success of Hank Williams' "Lovesick Blues'" in 1949, producer Fred Rose was given carte blanche to sign country acts to MGM, and one of them was Hank's friend Braxton Shuffert. Schuffert also toured with Williams and his Drifting Cowboys. Williams had given Shuffert the song "A Teardrop on a Rose" but they needed one more tune for the flipside. Shuffert later recalled:

"I was wanting to sing 'I'll Still Write Your Name in the Sand,' but Fred said, 'No-o-o, we don't give other folks royalties. I'm going over to the house for a few minutes. You and Hank write something.'...When Fred came back, I sang him 'Rockin' Chair Daddy,' and he signed me up that evening."

Like every record that Rose produced for MGM that was not by Hank Williams, the Jimmie Rodgers-influenced "Rockin' Chair Daddy" sold poorly. No recording of Williams singing the song has ever been located.

== Another version ==
Sam Phillips released a single on his own Sun Records, of "Rockin' Chair Daddy" b/w "The Great Medical Menagerist" in 1954, which had been recorded by Harmonica Frank.
