= Carey Bell's Blues Harp =

Studio album by Carey Bell
- Released: 1969
- Recorded: February 12 and May 6, 1969
- Studio: Sound Studios, Chicago
- Genre: Blues
- Length: 55:35
- Label: Delmark; DS-622
- Producer: Robert G. Koester

Carey Bell chronology
| Carey Bell's Blues Harp (1969) | Big Walter Horton with Carey Bell (1972) |

Carey Bell's Blues Harp is the debut album by the American blues musician Carey Bell, recorded in Chicago in 1969, that was released by the Delmark label.

== Reception ==
Professional ratings
Review scores
| Source | Rating |
|---|---|
| Allmusic | 4/5 stars |
| The Penguin Guide to Blues Recordings | 2/4 stars |

Allmusic reviewer Bill Dahl stated "It's a mite ragged around the edges, but Bell's 1969 debut session certainly sports the proper ambience -- and no wonder, with guitarists Eddie Taylor and Jimmy Dawkins and pianist Pinetop Perkins on hand to help out. No less than four Little Walter covers and two more from Muddy Waters' songbook dot the set, but many of the best moments occur on the original numbers". The Penguin Guide to Blues Recordings said "Neither band does more than run through the changes with indifferent precision ... Bell is an intermittently effective vocalist but his harmonica playing lacks adventure and inspiration".

== Track listing ==
All compositions by Carey Bell except where noted

1. "I'm Ready" (Willie Dixon) − 3:08
2. "I Got to Find Somebody" (Little Walter) − 4:20
3. "I Wanna Will My Love to You" (Little Walter) − 3:40
4. "Blue Monday at Kansas City Red's" − 4:03
5. "I'm Gonna Buy Me a Train Ticket" − 3:47
6. "Come on Over Here" − 3:09
7. "I Cry So Much" (Mel London) − 4:47
8. "Sad Dreams" − 4:47
9. "Everything's Up Tight" (Junior Wells) − 4:05
10. "You Know It Ain't Right" (Little Walter) − 3:45
11. "Last Night" (Little Walter) − 4:34
12. "Rocking With a Chromatic" − 3:22
13. "I'm Gonna Buy Me a Train Ticket" [alternate take] − 2:29 Additional track on CD reissue
14. "Walking in the Park" − 2:54 Additional track on CD reissue
15. "Carey Bell's Blues Harp" − 15:44 Additional track on CD reissue
- Recorded at Sound Studios, Chicago on February 12, 1969 (tracks 1, 3, 5, 6, 8, 10, 12 & 13) and May 6, 1969 (tracks 2, 4, 7, 9, 10, 14 & 15)

== Personnel ==
- Carey Bell − harmonica, vocals
- Pinetop Perkins − piano (tracks 1, 3, 5, 6, 8, 10, 12 & 13)
- Jimmy Dawkins (tracks 1, 3, 5, 6, 8, 10, 12 & 13), Royal Johnson (tracks 2, 4, 7, 9, 10, 14 & 15), Eddie Taylor (tracks 2, 4, 7, 9, 10, 14 & 15) − guitar
- Sidney Thomas (tracks 2, 4, 7, 9, 10, 14 & 15), Willie Williams (tracks 1, 3, 5, 6, 8, 10, 12 & 13) – drums
