= Blind Joe Hill =

American drummer (1931–1999)

- Born: Unknown; January 7, 1931; Pennsylvania, United States.
- Died: November 17, 1999 (aged 68) Los Angeles, California, United States
- Genres: Blues
- Occupation: One-man band
- Instruments: Guitar, drums, harmonica, vocals
- Years active: 1950s–1998
- Labels: Barrelhouse, L+R

Blind Joe Hill (January 7, 1931 – November 17, 1999) was an American blues singer, guitarist, harmonica player and drummer.

A one-man band, he was adopted and named Joe Thomas Hill after being born in Pennsylvania, United States. He played in the styles of Joe Hill Louis and Doctor Ross. He used his craggy vocals supported by guitar, bass, and drums, and was one of the last practitioners of the one-man blues band tradition. Hill recorded two albums under his own name on the Barrelhouse and L+R labels, and was part of the 1985 American Folk Blues Festival touring Europe.

Blind Joe Hill played occasionally at the Starvation Cafe in Fontana California in the early 1980s.

He died in Los Angeles, California, and was cremated on November 17, 1999.
