= Earring George Mayweather =

American blues harmonica player, songwriter and singer (1927–1995)

- Born: George Mayweather Jr. September 27, 1927; Montgomery County, Alabama, United States
- Died: February 12, 1995 (aged 67) Boston, Massachusetts, United States
- Genres: Electric blues, Chicago blues
- Occupations: Harmonicist, songwriter and singer
- Instruments: Harmonica, vocals
- Years active: 1950s–1995
- Label: Tone Cool Records

Earring George Mayweather (September 27, 1927 – February 12, 1995) was an American electric blues and Chicago blues harmonica player, songwriter and singer. He recorded only one solo album, but he played the harmonica on recordings by J. B. Hutto and Eddie Taylor.

AllMusic commented that his album Whup It! Whup It! was "an admirable shot at recreating the '50s Chicago harp sound".

== Life and career ==
George Mayweather Jr. was born in Montgomery County, Alabama. He learned to play the harmonica after receiving the instrument as a Christmas present at the age of six. Inspired by the playing of Sonny Boy Williamson I, Mayweather mainly taught himself the rudiments of the instrument. Upon his relocation to Chicago, Illinois, in September 1949, he befriended Little Walter, who taught him techniques of harmonica playing. He lived in Chicago, next door to J. B. Hutto, and in 1951 he teamed up with Hutto and the percussionist Eddie "Porkchop" Hines to form the Hawks, a trio performing on weekends at the Maxwell Street market. With few opportunities for steady work, Mayweather alternately performed with Hutto and in Bo Diddley's backing ensemble. In 1952, when Little Walter left Muddy Waters's touring band, Mayweather was offered a job as his replacement, but he declined the potentially lucrative position. By 1954, Mayweather recorded with Hutto in sessions for Chance Records, which produced "Dim Lights", "Things Are So Slow", "Combination Boogie", and "Pet Cream Man". He later teamed up Eddie Taylor, and together they recorded a number of tracks, including "You’ll Always Have a Home" and "Don’t Knock at My Door". Several of these were released as singles, but they were not commercial successes.

Mayweather continued working in Chicago during the 1950s and was given the nickname "Earring" by Big Bill Hill, a Chicago disc jockey.

In the late 1980s, Mayweather relocated to Boston, Massachusetts, and gained regular employment at the 1369 Jazz Club.

In 1992, Mayweather recorded his first solo album, ‘Whup It! Whup It!’, using musicians from the Magic Rockers band, which backed Luther "Guitar Junior" Johnson, the album comprised mostly Chicago blues standards, made notable by Howlin' Wolf ("Forty Four"), Ray Charles ("What'd I Say"), Muddy Waters, Jimmy Rogers and Little Walter. There was one original track, "Cheatin' on Me", written by Mayweather. The AllMusic music journalist Bill Dahl noted that the album was "an admirable shot at recreating the '50s Chicago harp sound".

Mayweather died of liver cancer in Boston, in February 1995, at the age of 67.

== Discography ==
Year	Title	Record label
1992	Whup It! Whup It!	Tone Cool Records

== See also ==
- List of electric blues musicians
- List of Chicago blues musicians
