= Slippin' and Slidin' (album) =

Studio album by J. B. Hutto
- Released: 1984
- Recorded: 1983
- Studio: Blue Jay
- Genre: Blues
- Length: 38:26
- Labels: Varrick; Bullseye Blues & Jazz
- Producer: Scott Billington

J. B. Hutto chronology
Slideslinger (1982)	Slippin' and Slidin' (1984)	Bluesmaster (1985)

Slippin' and Slidin' (reissued with two additional tracks in 1999 as Rock with Me Tonight) is an album by the American musician J. B. Hutto, released in 1984. He was backed by the New Hawks. The album was recorded a few months before Hutto's 1983 death.

== Production ==
Recorded at Blue Jay Studio, in Carlisle, Massachusetts, the album was produced by Scott Billington. Hutto was backed by Roomful of Blues on some of the tracks. Ron Levy contributed on piano. "Somebody Loan Me a Dime" is a cover of the Fenton Robinson song. "Pretty Baby" was written by Junior Parker.

== Critical reception ==
Professional ratings
Review scores
Source	Rating
The Albuquerque Tribune	A−
AllMusic	3/5 stars
Robert Christgau	B+
Lincoln Journal Star	4/5 stars
MusicHound Blues: The Essential Album Guide	3.5/5 stars
The Penguin Guide to Blues Recordings	4/4 stars
The Virgin Encyclopedia of the Blues	3/5 stars

The Evening Post concluded that "every note sounds like J. B. knew it was going to be his last and it had to count." The Pittsburgh Press said that "neither his enthusiasm nor his intense slide guitar had been diminished, and the music is excellent blues." The Albuquerque Tribune opined that the album "leaves no doubt he was truly one of the great blues players of the younger generation." The Lincoln Journal Star labeled it "raw, elemental blues featuring stinging slide guitar". Robert Christgau wrote that the "slide guitar king makes his tightest and most raucous recorded music since 1968's definitive Hawk Squat!"

In 1987, the Houston Chronicle called the album "good stuff, alternately haunting and honking; unlike many bluesmen, Hutto did not suffer from a long, slow decline." The Penguin Guide to Blues Recordings noted that Hutto's "slide playing is his sharpest and fullest on disc".

== Track listing ==
No.	Title	Length
1.	"Pretty Baby"	4:36
2.	"Why Do Things Happen to Me"	5:17
3.	"New Hawk Walk"	3:43
4.	"Eighteen Year Old Girl"	4:16
5.	"Black's Ball"	2:55
6.	"Soul Lover"	3:00
7.	"Somebody Loan Me a Dime"	2:58
8.	"Jealous Hearted Woman"	5:50
9.	"Little Girl Dressed in Blue"	3:07
10.	"I'm Leaving You"	2:44
Total length:		38:26

Rock with Me Tonight reissue bonus tracks
No.	Title	Length
11.	"Floating Fruit Boogie"	3:51
12.	"Radar"	3:04
Total length:		45:21
