= Last Night (Carey Bell album) =

Studio album by Carey Bell
- Released: 1973
- Recorded: 1973
- Studio: Chicago
- Genre: Blues
- Length: 36:40
- Label: BluesWay; BLS 6079
- Producer: Al Smith

Carey Bell chronology
Big Walter Horton with Carey Bell (1972)	Last Night (1973)	Gamblin' Woman (1980)

Last Night is an album by blues musician Carey Bell released by the BluesWay label in 1973.

== Reception ==
Professional ratings
Review scores
Source	Rating
AllMusic	3/5 stars

The AllMusic review by Bill Dahl stated: "Nothing flashy or outrageous here, just a meat-and-potatoes session produced by Al Smith that satisfyingly showcases Bell's charms ... backed by a combo that boasted a daunting collective experience level".

== Track listing ==
All compositions credited to Carey Bell except where noted

1. "Last Night" (Walter Jacobs) − 3:38
2. "Taking You Downtown" − 3:02
3. "Rosa, I Love Your Soul" − 3:31
4. "I'm Worried" (Willie Dixon) − 3:28
5. "Cho' Cho' Blues" − 2:38
6. "Tomorrow Night" − 2:25
7. "She's 19 Years Old" (McKinley Morganfield) − 2:44
8. "Leaving in the Morning" (Jacobs) − 2:25
9. "Love Pretty Women" − 3:23
10. "Mean Mistreater" (Morganfield) − 4:18
11. "Freda" − 2:10
12. "I Want to See You Tomorrow Night" − 2:58

== Personnel ==
- Carey Bell – harmonica, vocals
- Joe Perkins – piano
- Eddie Taylor – guitar
- Dave Myers − bass
- Willie Smith – drums
