= Advent Records =

1970s American independent record label

Advent Records was an American independent record label specializing in blues. It was founded by Frank Scott in 1972 and ran until 1978. Musicians on that label were, among others, Robert Lockwood, Jr., Sonny Rhodes, Thomas Shaw, Johnny Shines, and Eddie Taylor. HighTone Records later reissued many of their albums.

== See also ==
- List of record labels
