= Heartaches and Pain =

Studio album by Carey Bell
- Released: 1994
- Recorded: March 15, 1977
- Studio: PS Studio, Chicago
- Genre: Blues
- Length: 37:14
- Label: Delmark; DD-666
- Producer: Ralph Bass

Carey Bell chronology
Breakdown Blues Live! (1993)	Heartaches and Pain (1994)	Harpmaster (1994)

Heartaches and Pain is an album by the American blues musician Carey Bell, recorded in Chicago in 1977, but not released by the Delmark label until 1994.

== Reception ==
Professional ratings
Review scores
Source	Rating
AllMusic	3/5 stars
The Penguin Guide to Blues Recordings	2.5/4 stars

AllMusic reviewer Bill Dahl stated: "Legendary producer Ralph Bass supervised this quickie session back in 1977, but it failed to see the light of day domestically until Delmark rescued it from oblivion. They did the blues world a favor: it's a worthwhile session, Bell storming through a mostly original setlist". The Penguin Guide to Blues Recordings wrote: "Given the conditions, it's hardly surprising the musicians went for proficiency rather than inspiration ... One can't blame the musicians for the exploitative nature of the session but the results are invariably no more than pleasant".

== Track listing ==
All compositions by Carey Bell except where noted

1. "Carey Bell Rocks" − 3:27
2. "Heartaches and Pains" − 5:42
3. "One Day You're Gonna Get Lucky" − 3:31
4. "Black-Eyed Peas" − 4:51
5. "So Hard to Leave You Alone" − 6:56
6. "Stop That Train, Conductor" (Doctor Clayton) − 3:36
7. "Everythings Gonna' Be All Right" (Walter Jacobs) − 4:35
8. "Capri Crash" − 4:36

== Personnel ==
- Carey Bell − harmonica, vocals
- Bob Riedy − piano
- Lurrie Bell − guitar (tracks 3–8)
- Alabama Junior Pettis − rhythm guitar (tracks 1–3, 5, 6 & 8)
- Aron Burton − bass
- Sam Lay – drums
