= Lurrie Bell =

American blues guitarist and singer (born 1958)

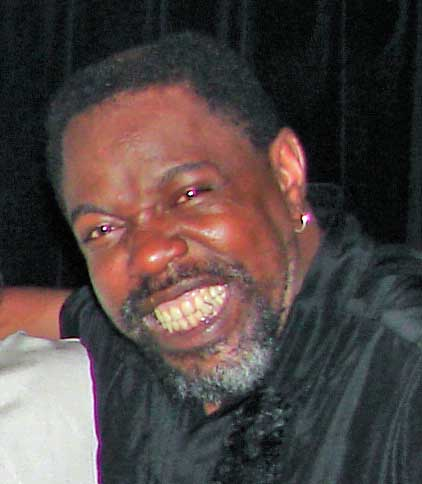
- Bell in 2007

Background information
- Born: Lurrie C. Bell; December 13, 1958 (age 67); Chicago, Illinois; United States
- Genres: Chicago blues
- Occupation: Musician,
- Instruments: Vocals, guitar
- Years active: 1970s – present
- Labels: JSP; Delmark; P-Vine; Vypyr; Aria B.G.
- Website: Lurrie.com

Lurrie Bell (born Lurrie C. Bell, December 13, 1958, Chicago, Illinois, United States) is an American blues guitarist and singer. His father was renowned blues harmonica player Carey Bell.

== Career ==
Bell started playing guitar at the age of six, and in his teens he polished his skills playing with the legends of Chicago blues scene including Eddy Clearwater, Big Walter Horton and Eddie Taylor.

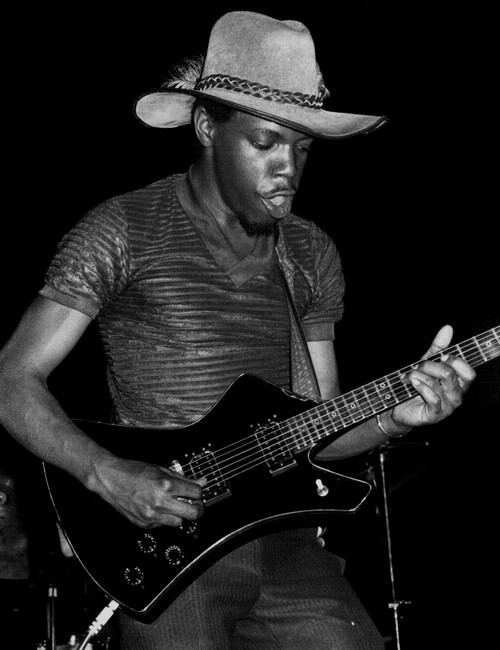
Bell in Paris, May 30, 1980

In the mid-1970s, he joined Koko Taylor's Blues Machine, and he toured with the band for four years. He made his recording debut in 1977 appearing on his father's album Heartaches and Pain and also on Eddie C. Campbell's King of the Jungle. It was around that time that he formed The Sons of Blues with musicians including Billy Branch on harmonica. Three tracks of the band's recordings were featured in the Alligator Records compilation Living Chicago Blues Vol. 3 released in 1978. In 1989 he released his first solo effort, Everybody Wants To Win, on JSP Records.

Though Bell's career appeared to be headed in the right direction, drawing attention of blues fans around the world as a young prodigy of the blues, he battled emotional problems and drug abuse for many years, which kept him away from performing on a regular basis.

He began a comeback in 1995 with the well-received album Mercurial Son, his first of several from the Delmark label. A series of albums followed thereafter, and he started to perform more frequently in the Chicago club and blues festival circuits.

Bell is featured on Gettin' Up – Live at Buddy Guy's Legends, Rosa's and Lurrie's Home, a 2007 CD and DVD release from Delmark, where he plays with his father, Carey. Soon after this release, Carey died in May 2007, and this became his last recorded effort.

In 2014, Bell won a Blues Music Award for his track "Blues in My Soul", in the 'Song of the Year' category. He was nominated for a similar award in four other categories. In 2015, Bell won a Blues Music Award in the 'Traditional Blues Male Artist' category.

Bell's 2016 album, Can't Shake This Feeling, was nominated for a Grammy Award for Best Traditional Blues Album. Matthew Skoller's harmonica work featured prominently on the album, and he was the record producer on Bell's earlier Let's Talk About Love and The Devil Ain't Got No Music albums.

He became a 2024 inductee to the Blues Foundation's Blues Hall of Fame.

== Discography ==
=== Solo ===
- 1989 Everybody Wants to Win (JSP)
- 1995 Mercurial Son (Delmark)
- 1997 700 Blues (Delmark)
- 1997 Young Man's Blues (JSP)
- 1998 Kiss of Sweet Blues (Delmark)
- 1998 The Blues Caravan Live at Pit Inn 1982 (P-Vine)
- 1999 Blues Had a Baby (Delmark)
- 2001 Cutting Heads (Vypyr)
- 2007 Let's Talk About Love (Aria B.G.)
- 2012 The Devil Ain't Got No Music (Aria B.G.)
- 2013 Blues in My Soul (Delmark)
- 2016 Can't Shake This Feeling (Delmark)

=== With Carey Bell ===
- 1977 Heartaches and Pain (Delmark) released 1994
- 1982 Going on Main Street (L+R)
- 1984 Son of a Gun (Rooster Blues)
- 1986 Straight Shoot (Blues South West)
- 1990 Dynasty (JSP)
- 1994 Harpmaster (JSP)
- 1995 Deep Down (Alligator)
- 1997 Father&Son The Blues Collection (BLU GNC 072)
- 2004 Second Nature (Alligator) (recorded in 1991)
- 2007 Gettin' Up, Live at Buddy Guy's Legends, Rosa's and Lurrie's Home (Delmark)

=== Collaborations with other artists ===
- 1981 American Folk Blues Festival '81 (L+R)
- 1982 The Sons of Blues Live '82 (L+R)
- 1982 Chicago's Young Blues Generation (L+R) with Billy Branch
- 1991 Rocket Pocket (Bluelight) with Doobie Twisters
- 1998 Chicago's Hottest Guitars: Chicago Blues Session, Vol. 25 (Wolf) with Phil Guy
- 2009 Live at Chan's: Combo Platter No. 2 (with Nick Moss & The Flip Tops)
- 2024 Set Me Free (with Frank Catalano)

== See also ==
- List of Chicago blues musicians
- List of electric blues musicians
