= Chicago/The Blues/Today! =

Studio album by various artists
- Released: 1966
- Recorded: 1965
- Genre: Blues
- Label: Vanguard
- Producer: Samuel Charters

Professional ratings
Review scores
Source	Rating
AllMusic	5/5 stars
The Penguin Guide to Blues Recordings	3.5/4 stars

Chicago/The Blues/Today! is a series of three albums by various Chicago blues artists. It was recorded in late 1965 by Vanguard Records and released in 1966. It was remastered and released as a three-disc set in 1999.

In 1965, Samuel Charters, working for Vanguard, asked nine different blues artists to come into the studio and record several songs each, so that he could produce a sampler of Chicago blues music. The albums made a significant impression on some well-known American and English rock musicians, who had not yet had much exposure to electric blues.

The artists featured on Chicago/The Blues/Today! are Junior Wells, J. B. Hutto, Otis Spann, James Cotton, Otis Rush, Homesick James, Johnny Young, Johnny Shines, and Big Walter Horton. Also contributing are other musicians such as Buddy Guy, Willie Dixon, and Floyd Jones.

== Track listing ==
=== Disc 1 / Volume 1 ===
The Junior Wells Chicago Blues Band

1. "Help Me"
2. "It Hurts Me Too"
3. "Messin' with the Kid"
4. "Vietcong Blues"
5. "All Night Long"

J. B. Hutto and His Hawks

6. "Going Ahead"
7. "Please Help"
8. "Too Much Alcohol"
9. "Married Woman Blues"
10. "That's the Truth"

Otis Spann's South Side Piano

11. "Marie"
12. "Burning Fire"
13. "S. P. Blues"
14. "Sometimes I Wonder"
15. "Spann's Stomp"

=== Disc 2 / Volume 2 ===
The Jimmy Cotton Blues Quartet

1. "Cotton Crop Blues"
2. "The Blues Keep Falling"
3. "Love Me or Leave"
4. "Rocket 88"
5. "West Helena Blues"

The Otis Rush Blues Band

6. "Everything's Going to Turn Out Alright"
7. "It's a Mean Old World"
8. "I Can't Quit You Baby"
9. "Rock"
10. "It's My Own Fault"

Homesick James and His Dusters

11. "Dust My Broom"
12. "Somebody Been Talkin'"
13. "Set a Date"
14. "So Mean to Me"

=== Disc 3 / Volume 3 ===
Johnny Young's South Side Blues Band

1. "One More Time"
2. "Kid Man Blues"
3. "My Black Mare"
4. "Stealin' Back"
5. "I Got Mine In Time"
6. "Tighten Up on It"

The Johnny Shines Blues Band

7. "Dynaflow Blues"
8. "Black Spider Blues"
9. "Layin' Down My Shoes and Clothes"
10. "If I Get Lucky"

Big Walter Horton's Blues Harp Band with Memphis Charlie

11. "Rockin' My Boogie"

The Johnny Shines Blues Band

12. "Mr. Boweevil"
13. "Hey, Hey"

== Personnel ==
=== Musicians ===
The Junior Wells Chicago Blues Band

- Junior Wells – harmonica, vocals
- Buddy Guy – guitar
- Jack Myers – bass
- Fred Below – drums

J. B. Hutto and His Hawks

- J. B. Hutto – guitar, vocals
- Herman Hassell – bass
- Frank Kirkland – drums

Otis Spann's South Side Piano

- Otis Spann – piano, vocals
- S. P. Leary – drums

The Jimmy Cotton Quartet

- Jimmy Cotton – harmonica, vocals
- James Madison – guitar
- Otis Spann – piano
- S. P. Leary – drums

The Otis Rush Blues Band

- Otis Rush – guitar, vocals
- Robert "Sax" Crowder – alto saxophone
- Luther Tucker – guitar
- Roger Jones – bass
- Willie Lion – drums

Homesick James and His Dusters

- Homesick James – guitar, vocals
- Willie Dixon – bass
- Frank Kirkland – drums

Johnny Young's South Side Blues Band

- Johnny Young – guitar, mandolin, vocals
- Walter Horton – harmonica
- Hayes Ware – bass
- Elga Edmonds – drums

The Johnny Shines Blues Band

- Johnny Shines – guitar, vocals
- Walter Horton – harmonica
- Floyd Jones – bass
- Frank Kirkland – drums

Big Walter Horton's Blues Harp Band with Memphis Charlie

- Walter Horton – harmonica
- Memphis Charlie Musselwhite – harmonica
- Johnny Shines – guitar
- Floyd Jones – bass
- Frank Kirkland – drums

=== Production ===
- Produced and annotated by Samuel Charters
- Reissue production: Tom Vickers
- Reissue engineering: Jeff Zaraya
- Reissue additional notes: Ed Ward
- Photography: Ann Charters, Ray Flerlage
- Reissue package design: Drew Cartwright, Barry Ridge Graphic Design
- Creative services manager: Georgette Cartwright, Vanguard Records
