= Oh My God (band) =

- Origin: Chicago, Illinois, U.S.
- Genres: Indie rock
- Years active: 2000–present
- Labels: Split Red
- Members: Billy O'Neill (Vocals, bass); Ig (Organ, vocals); Danny Yost (Drums); Zach Verdoorne (Bass, guitar, vocals)
- Website: ohmygodmusic.com

Oh My God is an American rock band from Chicago, Illinois, United States, that formed in 1999.

Oh My God's most recent album, The Night Undoes The Work Of The Day, was released on September 29, 2009, along with a US tour to promote it.

When recording Fools Want Noise!, the band experimented with new styles, adding guitars to the songs "Facewash" and "Put It in a Song". Kerrang! magazine quoted:

"The addition of a c, particularly on the anthemic 'Facewash' and soulful shred of 'Put It in a Song'."

The band signed with a new record label, Split Red Records, shortly before recording this album. Shortly before the release of this album, the band toured around the US.

== Discography ==
=== EPs ===
- Oh My God EP (2000)

=== Studio albums ===
Cover of You're Too Straight to Love album

- Well (2001)
- The Action Album! (2002)
- Interrogations and Confessions (2003)
- You're Too Straight to Love Me (2004)
- Fools Want Noise! (2008)
- The Night Undoes The Work Of The Day (2009)
