= Eddie Taylor =

American electric blues guitarist and singer (1923–1985)

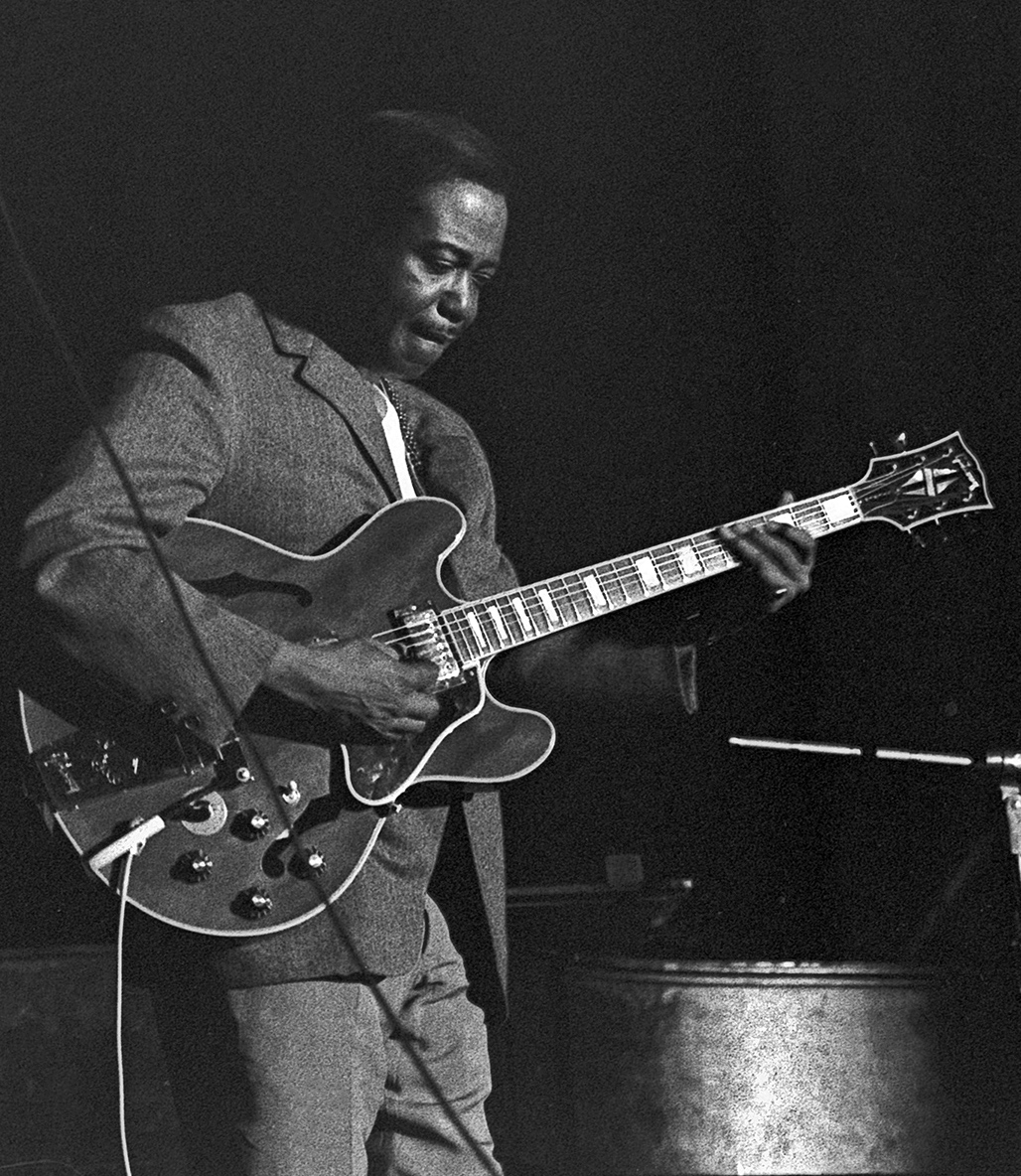
- Taylor in 1970

Background information
- Also known as: "Playboy" Taylor
- Born: Edward Taylor; January 29, 1923; Benoit, Mississippi, U.S.
- Died: December 25, 1985 (aged 62) Chicago, Illinois, U.S.
- Genres: Electric blues
- Occupation: Musician
- Instruments: Guitar; vocals
- Website: first

Eddie Taylor (January 29, 1923 – December 25, 1985) was an American electric blues guitarist and singer.

== Biography ==
Born Edward Taylor in Benoit, Mississippi, as a boy Taylor taught himself to play the guitar. He spent his early years playing at venues around Leland, Mississippi, where he taught his friend Jimmy Reed to play the guitar. With a guitar style deeply rooted in the Mississippi Delta tradition, Taylor moved to Chicago, Illinois, in 1948.

While Taylor never achieved the stardom of some of his contemporaries in the post-World War II Chicago blues scene, he was nevertheless an integral part of that era. He is especially noted as a main accompanist for Jimmy Reed; he also worked for John Lee Hooker, Big Walter Horton, Sam Lay, and others. Earwig Music Company recorded him with Kansas City Red and Big John Wrencher for the album Original Chicago Blues. He later teamed up with Earring George Mayweather, and they jointly recorded several tracks, including "You'll Always Have a Home" and "Don't Knock at My Door". Several of these were released as singles, of which "Big Town Playboy" and "Bad Boy", issued by Vee Jay Records, were local hits in the 1950s, but Taylor's singles generally were not commercially successful.

In the 1970s, Taylor participated in the American Blues Legends '74 tour of Europe organised by Big Bear Records, appearing on the album of the same name as well as solo long-player, Ready For Eddie.

Later, in "semi-retirement", Taylor was the regular lead guitarist with Peter Dames and the Chicago River Blues Band, later known as Peter Dames and the Rhythm Flames.

Taylor played lead guitar on several songs (including the title track) on the album Be Careful How You Vote by Sunnyland Slim, and played live with Sunnyland Slim on some tour dates in the 1980s.

Taylor's wife, Vera, was a singer and songwriter, and was the niece of the bluesmen Eddie "Guitar" Burns and Jimmy Burns. Taylor's late son Eddie Taylor Jr. was a blues guitarist in Chicago, his stepson Larry Taylor is a blues drummer and vocalist, and his daughter Demetria is a blues vocalist in Chicago.

Taylor died on Christmas Day in 1985 in Chicago, at the age of 62, and was interred in Restvale Cemetery in Alsip, Illinois. He was posthumously inducted into the Blues Hall of Fame in 1987.

== Discography ==
=== Albums recorded as leader ===
==== Studio albums ====
Album	Album details
I Feel So Bad	Recorded June 1972, Hollywood, California; released 1972 (Advent Records, LP, CD)
Ready for Eddie	Recorded February–April 1974, London, England; released 1975 (Big Bear Records, LP, CD)
My Heart Is Bleeding	Recorded January 21, 1980, Chicago, Illinois; released 1980 (L+R Records, LP)
Still Not Ready for Eddie	Released 1987 (Antone's Records, LP)

==== Live album ====
Album	Album details
Bad Boy a Long Way from Chicago	Recorded 1978, Kyoto, Japan; released 1978 (P-Vine Records LP, CD)

=== Collaboration albums ===
Album	Album details
Masters of Modern Blues Volume 3	Recorded June 1966, Chicago, Illinois; released 1966 (Testament Records, LP, CD)
Goin' to Chicago	Recorded 196?, Chicago, Illinois; released 196? (Testament Records, LP, CD)
American Blues Legends '74	Recorded February–March 1974, London, England; released 1974 (Big Bear Records, LP, CD)

=== Albums recorded as sideman ===
Album	Album details
Original Chicago Blues	Recordings by Joe Carter and Kansas City Red; released 1982 (JSP Records, LP, CD)

- 1958: I'm Jimmy Reed – Jimmy Reed (Vee-Jay)
- 1959: I'm John Lee Hooker – John Lee Hooker (Vee-Jay)
- 1967: Soulin' – Jimmy Reed (BluesWay)
- 1968: Big Boss Man – Jimmy Reed (BluesWay)
- 1969: Carey Bell's Blues Harp – Carey Bell (Delmark)
- 1969: Down in Virginia – Jimmy Reed (BluesWay)
- 1972: Big Walter Horton with Carey Bell − Big Walter Horton and Carey Bel' (Alligator)
- 1973: Last Night – Carey Bell (BluesWay)
- 1975: Street Talkin' (Muse 5087), compilation of Vee Jay recordings with seven tracks by Elmore James tracks and seven by Taylor
- 1981: Big Town Playboy (Charly 1015), compilation of Vee Jay recordings under Taylor's name, except "Good Hearted"
