= Can't Shake This Feeling =

Studio album by Lurrie Bell
- Released: 2016
- Genre: Chicago blues
- Length: 55:05
- Label: Delmark

Lurrie Bell chronology
Blues in my Soul (2013)	Can't Shake This Feeling (2016)

Can't Shake This Feeling is an album by Lurrie Bell. It earned Bell a Grammy Award nomination for Best Traditional Blues Album. At the 38th Blues Music Award ceremony in May 2017, Can't Shake This Feeling won the 'Traditional Blues Album of the Year' category.

== Track listing ==
1. "Blues Is Trying to Keep Up with Me" – 4:11
2. "Drifting" – 3:25
3. "I Get So Weary" – 4:21
4. "One Eyed Woman" – 4:12
5. "This Worrisome Feeling in My Heart" – 4:54
6. "Sit Down Baby" – 2:58
7. "Hold Me Tight" – 2:36
8. "Sinners Prayer" – 4:43
9. "I Can't Shake This Feeling" – 4:33
10. "Born with the Blues" – 5:59
11. "Do You Hear" – 3:54
12. "Hidden Charms" – 3:57
13. "Faith and Music" – 5:22
