= J. B. Hutto =

American blues slide guitarist and singer (1926–1983)

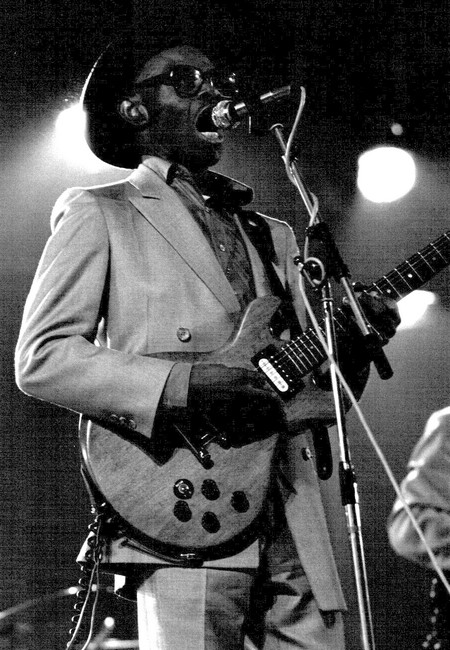
- Hutto in France in December 1982

Background information
- Born: Joseph Benjamin Hutto; April 26, 1926; Blackville, South Carolina, U.S.
- Died: June 12, 1983 (aged 57) Harvey, Illinois, U.S.
- Genres: Blues
- Occupation: Musician
- Instruments: Guitar; vocals
- Years active: 1954–1983

Joseph Benjamin Hutto (April 26, 1926 – June 12, 1983) was an American blues musician. Influenced by Elmore James, Hutto became known for his slide guitar playing and declamatory style of singing. He was inducted into the Blues Hall of Fame two years after his death.

== Life and career ==
Joseph Benjamin Hutto was born in Blackville, South Carolina, the fifth of seven children. His family moved to Augusta, Georgia, when he was three years old. His father, Calvin, was a preacher. Joseph and his three brothers and three sisters formed a gospel group, the Golden Crowns, singing in local churches. Calvin Hutto died in 1949, and the family relocated to Chicago.

Hutto served as a draftee in the Korean War in the early 1950s, driving trucks in combat zones.

In Chicago, Hutto took up the drums and played with Johnny Ferguson and his Twisters. He also played the piano before settling on the guitar and performing on the streets with the percussionist Eddie "Porkchop" Hines. They added Joe Custom on the second guitar and started playing club gigs. The harmonica player Earring George Mayweather joined after sitting in with the band. Hutto named his band the Hawks after the wind that blows in Chicago. A recording session in 1954 resulted in the release of two singles by Chance Records. A second session later the same year, with the band supplemented by the pianist Johnny Jones, produced a third single.

Later in the 1950s, Hutto became disenchanted with performing and gave it up after a woman broke his guitar over her husband's head one night in a club where he was playing. For the next eleven years, he worked as a janitor in a funeral home to supplement his income. He returned to the music industry in the mid-1960s with a new version of the Hawks featuring Herman Hassell on bass and Frank Kirkland on drums. His recording career resumed with a session for Vanguard Records, released on the compilation album Chicago/The Blues/Today! Vol. 1, followed by albums for Testament and Delmark. The 1968 Delmark album Hawk Squat, which featured Sunnyland Slim on organ and piano, Lee Jackson on guitar, and Maurice McIntyre on tenor saxophone, is regarded as Hutto's best album up to this point.

After Hound Dog Taylor died in 1975, Hutto took over Taylor's band, the House Rockers, for a time. In the late 1970s, he moved to Boston and recruited a new band, the New Hawks, with whom he recorded studio albums for the Varrick label. His 1983 Varrick album, Slippin' and Slidin', the last of his career and later reissued on CD as Rock with Me Tonight, has been described as "near-perfect".

== Death and legacy ==
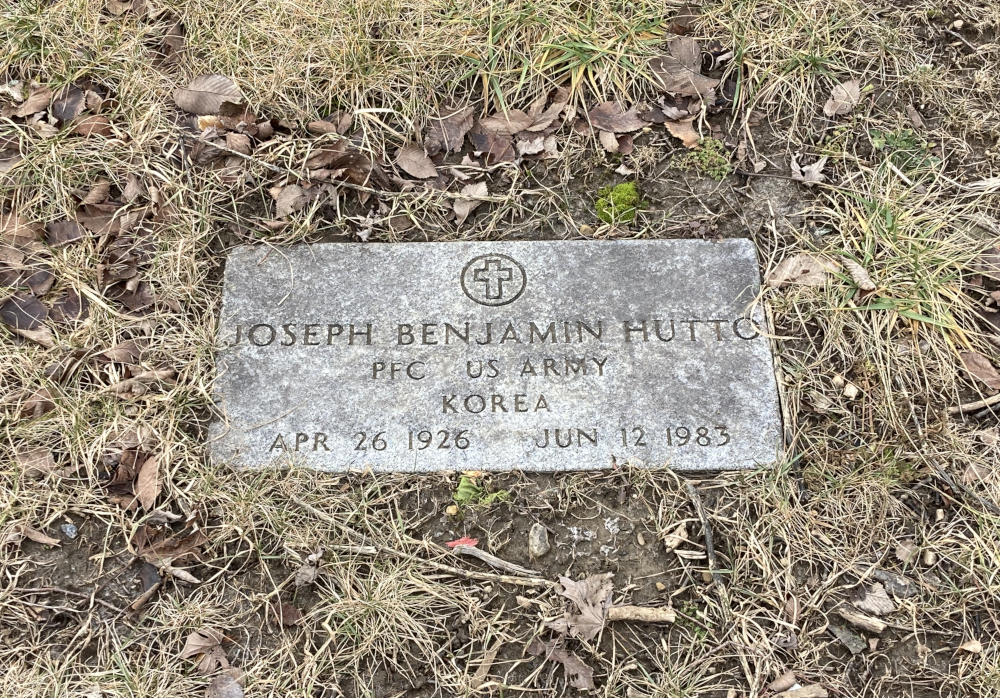
Hutto's grave at Restvale Cemetery

In the early 1980s, Hutto returned to Illinois, where he was diagnosed with carcinoid cancer. He died in 1983, at the age of 57, in Harvey. He was interred at Restvale Cemetery in Alsip, Illinois.

In 1985, the Blues Foundation inducted Hutto into its Hall of Fame. His nephew, Lil' Ed Williams (of Lil' Ed and the Blues Imperials), has carried on his legacy, playing and singing in a style close to his uncle's.

A red plastic Airline guitar sold via Montgomery Ward stores was informally referred to as a J. B. Hutto model due to his use of the guitar. Jack White later became well known for using the guitar in the early 2000s.

== Discography ==
=== Singles ===
- "Combination Boogie" / "Now She’s Gone", J. B. and His Hawks (Chance Records; CH-1155), 1954
- "Lovin' You" / "Pet Cream Man", J. B. and His Hawks (Chance Records; CH-1160), 1954
- "Dim Lights" / "Things Are So Slow", J. B. Hutto and His Hawks (Chance Records; CH-1165), 1954

=== Albums ===
- Chicago/The Blues/Today! Vol. 1 (Vanguard, 1966, five tracks only, remainder of record by Junior Wells and Otis Spann)
- Masters of Modern Blues (Testament, 1967)
- Hawk Squat (Delmark, 1968)
- Slidewinder (Delmark, 1973)
- Slideslinger (Black & Blue, 1982)
- Slippin' and Slidin' (Varrick, 1984) - Reissued on CD as Rock with Me Tonight (Bullseye Blues & Jazz, 1999)
- Bluesmaster (JSP, 1985)
- J. B. Hutto and The Houserockers Live 1977 (Wolf, 1991)

== See also ==
- Blues Hall of Fame
- List of blues musicians
- List of Chicago blues musicians
- List of slide guitarists

== Bibliography ==
- Leadbitter, Mike, and Neil Slaven (1987). Blues Records 1943 to 1970, a Selective Discography, Volume One, A to K. Record Information Services, London.
- Rowe, M. (1981). Chicago Blues: The City and the Music. Da Capo Press. ISBN 978-0306801457.
- van Rijn, G. (2004). Truman and Eisenhower Blues: African-American Blues and Gospel Songs, 1945–1960. Continuum. ISBN 978-0826456571.
