= Kent DuChaine =

- Born: Kent DuChaine; April 25, 1951 (age 74); Wayzata, Minnesota, United States
- Genres: Blues, Delta blues
- Occupation: Musician
- Instrument: National Steel Guitar
- Years active: 1970-present
- Website: Official website

Kent DuChaine (born April 25, 1951) is an American blues singer and guitarist.

== Name ==
DuChaine's surname has its origins in France, with his ancestors establishing roots in Canada at the outset of the 17th century. Eventually, they became integrated into the Native American Chickasaw tribe.

== Music career ==
DuChaine started in music when his father taught him to play the ukulele at six years old.

At the age of 13, he got his first electric guitar and formed a band with his friends in his hometown of Wayzata, Minnesota, playing popular music at private parties and school functions.

After reading some liner notes from an Eric Clapton album, Kent started researching blues. DuChaine discovered a Robert Johnson album and was astounded and fascinated at the banging sound as the bottleneck knocked against the frets as Johnson slid it up and down the neck of his guitar. Determined to recapture the sound, Kent used a butter knife. DuChaine immersed himself in the blues of Robert Johnson, Muddy Waters, Lightnin' Hopkins, T-Bone Walker and Bukka White and learned to play the slide guitar, soon developing his own style.

In 1970, DuChaine opened a show for Bukka White.

From 1972 until 1975, DuChaine performed in a band with Kim Wilson. The band backed blues musicians including Fenton Robinson, Boogie Woogie Red, Luther Tucker, Hubert Sumlin and Eddie "Guitar" Burns. The reputation of the band grew and Willie Dixon arranged a recording contract and a concert sharing the bill with Albert Collins, John Lee Hooker and Howlin' Wolf.

In 1979, DuChaine acquired Leadbessie, a beat-up 1934 National Steel Guitar, in an equally beat-up case and with extra heavy strings.

DuChaine discovered and looked up Johnny Shines in 1989. They traveled together for three years and performed over 200 shows. At that time they recorded Back To the Country with Snooky Pryor, and were honored with a Blues Music Award for best country blues album. In 1991, the Smithsonian Institution honored the King of the Delta Blues, Robert Johnson. DuChaine and Shines were invited to perform and Roots Of Rhythm & Blues: A Tribute to the Robert Johnson Era was the result. This was recorded by Sony BMG and also Grammy nominated. DuChaine and Shines' partnership and friendship were cut short when Johnny Shines died on 20 April 1992.

Since going solo in 1982 and hitting the road in the United States, DuChaine has clocked up over three million miles, including over a hundred tours in Europe, promoting the Delta blues. DuChaine also speaks of the history of the blues, the men who developed it, and his involvement with some of them, to audiences, with songs such as "Shake Your Moneymaker", "Jitterbug Swing”, "Trouble in Mind" and "St. James Infirmary Blues".

DuChaine has also toured the United Kingdom, including a gig at the famous Ceilidh Place in Ullapool. The Times newspaper has named him as one of the five best concerts in the United Kingdom.
