= Joe Carter (guitarist) =

American singer

Joe Carter (November 6, 1927 – June 15, 2001) was an American blues slide guitarist and singer, formerly active on the Chicago blues scene.

== Biography ==
Born Joseph J. Carter in Midland, Georgia, he was taught to play guitar by Lee Willis as a youngster in Georgia. He moved to Chicago, Illinois in 1952, where he met Muddy Waters. He formed his first band with Otis "Big Smokey" Smothers on guitar and Lester Davenport on harmonica, though he never recorded with this band. He was offered a recording contract with Cobra Records, but turned it down because he made more money with his club gigs. In the 1950s he performed frequently at the 708 Club, one of the premier blues clubs on Chicago's south side, often billed as Joe "Elmore James, Jr"., because Carter played slide guitar in a style similar to Elmore James.

Carter worked at the Hormel Meat Packing plant for many years when he was inactive as a musician.

Carter did not begin recording until 1976, when his debut album was issued on Barrelhouse Records. In the late 1980s he performed occasionally at the Lilly's nightclub on Chicago's north side, backed by the band The Ice Cream Men. By the early 1990s he had developed throat cancer and was forced to curtail his career.

Carter died in June 2001 in Chicago. In 2016 the Killer Blues Headstone Project placed a headstone at Washington Memory Gardens in Homewood, Illinois.

== Discography ==
- Mean & Evil Blues (Barrelhouse, 1976)
- Original Chicago Blues (JSP, 1982)
