= Carey Bell =

American blues musician (1936–2007)

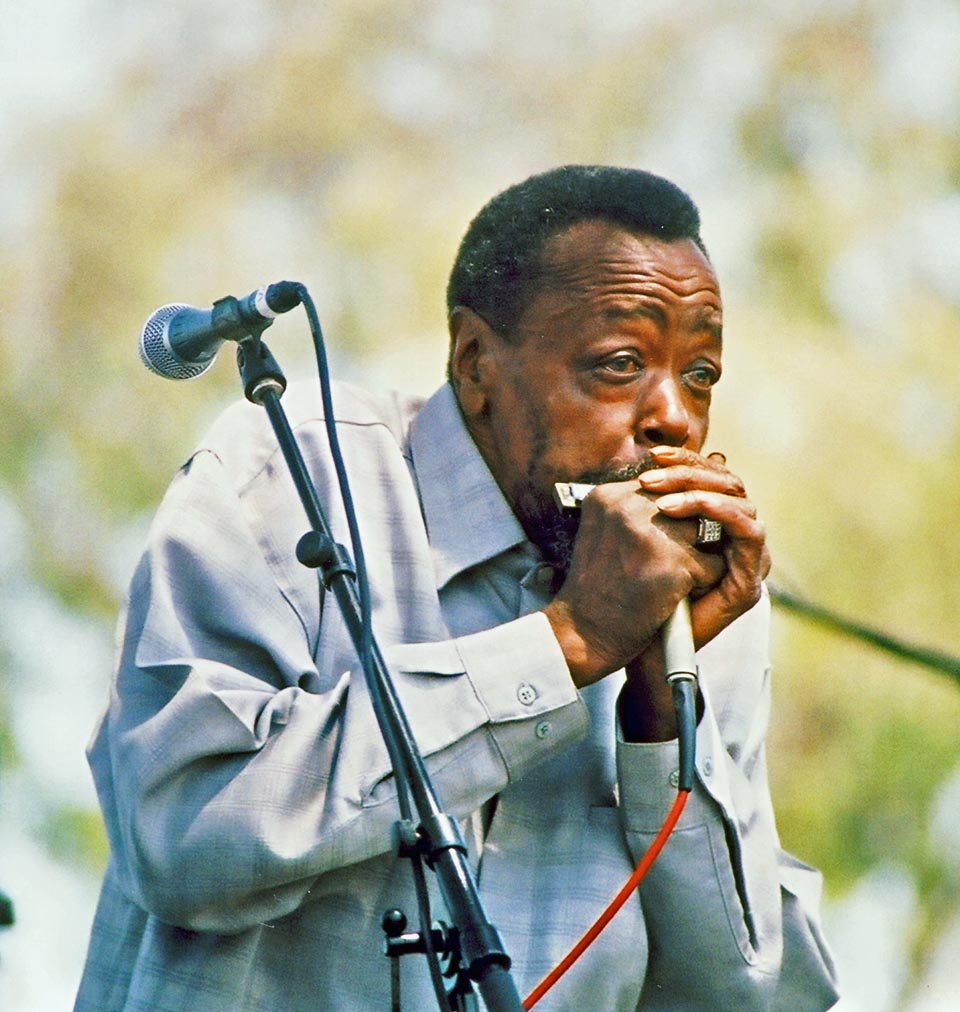
- Bell at the Long Beach Blues Festival, 2003

Background information
- Born: Carey Bell Harrington; November 14, 1936; Macon, Mississippi, US.
- Died: May 6, 2007 (aged 70) Chicago, Illinois, U.S.
- Genres: Chicago blues; electric blues
- Occupation: Musician
- Instruments: Harmonica; vocals; bass
- Years active: 1956–2007
- Labels: Delmark; Blind Pig; Alligator

Carey Bell Harrington (November 14, 1936 – May 6, 2007) was an American blues musician who played harmonica in the Chicago blues style. Bell played harmonica and bass guitar for other blues musicians from the late 1950s to the early 1970s before embarking on a solo career. Besides his own albums, he recorded as an accompanist or duo artist with Earl Hooker, Robert Nighthawk, Lowell Fulson, Eddie Taylor, Louisiana Red and Jimmy Dawkins and was a frequent partner with his son, the guitarist Lurrie Bell. Blues Revue called Bell "one of Chicago's finest harpists." The Chicago Tribune said Bell was "a terrific talent in the tradition of Sonny Boy Williamson and Little Walter." In 2023, he was inducted in the Blues Hall of Fame.

== Career ==
=== Early life ===
Bell was born Carey Bell Harrington in Macon, Mississippi. As a child, he was intrigued by the music of Louis Jordan and wanted a saxophone to be like his hero Jordan. His family could not afford one, so he had to settle for a harmonica, colloquially known as a "Mississippi saxophone". Soon Bell was attracted by the blues harmonica greats—DeFord Bailey, Big Walter Horton, Marion "Little Walter" Jacobs, Sonny Boy Williamson I and Sonny Boy Williamson II—and taught himself to play. By the time he was eight, he was proficient on the instrument. When he was thirteen, he joined the blues band of his godfather, the pianist Lovie Lee.

=== Chicago ===
In September 1956, Lee persuaded Bell to go with him to Chicago. Not long after arriving, Bell went to the Club Zanzibar, where Little Walter was appearing. Bell met Walter and later learned some harp playing from him and from Big Walter Horton, his main Chicago teacher. To help further his chances of employment as a musician, he learned how to play the electric bass from Hound Dog Taylor.

Having learned from some of the greatest blues harp players of the genre, Bell arrived in Chicago at an unfortunate time. The demand for harp players was decreasing there, as the electric guitar became the prominent blues instrument. To pay the bills, he joined several bands as a bassist. In the late 1960s, he performed regularly on the West Side of Chicago with the guitarists Eddie Taylor and Royal Johnson, playing harmonica and bass. In 1969, Bell toured Europe with the American Folk Blues Festival and played at the Royal Albert Hall in London, appearing on a live recording of the event.

=== Debut through 1980s ===
In 1969, Delmark Records in Chicago released Bell's debut album, Carey Bell's Blues Harp. He played with Muddy Waters in late 1970 and 1971 and later with Willie Dixon's Chicago Blues All-Stars. In 1972, Bell teamed up with Big Walter in the studio and recorded Big Walter Horton with Carey Bell for Alligator Records. A year later Bell released a solo project, Last Night, for BluesWay. He continued to play with Dixon and with his own groups. In 1978, he was featured on the Grammy-nominated album Living Chicago Blues, released by Alligator. Also in the 1970s, he contributed to two recordings by the Bob Riedy Blues Band.

During the 1980s Bell continued to record for various labels and to tour. In 1990, he teamed up with fellow harpists Junior Wells, James Cotton and Billy Branch to record Harp Attack!, one of Alligator's best-selling albums.

=== Alligator years ===
Despite years in the business and work with Alligator, Bell's first full-length solo album for the label, Deep Down, was not released until 1995. He released a second album, Good Luck Man, for the label in 1997. Second Nature followed in 2004 (recorded in Finland a few years earlier), in which he was accompanied by his son, the guitarist Lurrie Bell (who also played guitar, along with Carl Weathersby, on Deep Down).

In 1998, Bell was awarded the Blues Music Award for Traditional Male Artist of the Year.

=== Final work ===
In 2007, Delmark Records released a live set by Bell, accompanied by a band that included his son Lurrie, the guitarist Scott Cable, Kenny Smith, Bob Stroger, and Joe Thomas.

=== Death ===
Bell died of heart failure on May 6, 2007, in Chicago.

== Discography ==
- Carey Bell's Blues Harp (Delmark, 1969)
- Big Walter Horton with Carey Bell (Alligator, 1973) with Big Walter Horton
- Last Night (BluesWay, 1973)
- Heartaches and Pain (Delmark, 1977 [1994])
- Goin' on Main Street (Evidence), 1982
- Son of a Gun (Rooster Blues), 1984
- Straight Shoot (Blues South West), 1986
- Harpslinger (JSP), 1988
- Dynasty! (JSP), 1990
- Mellow Down Easy (Blind Pig), 1991
- Breakdown Blues Live!, with "The Cat" (CMA), 1992
- Harpmaster (JSP), 1994
- Carey Bell & Spike Ravenswood (Saar), 1995
- Deep Down (Alligator), 1995
- Good Luck Man (Alligator), 1997
- Brought Up the Hard Way (JSP CD 802), 1999
- Second Nature (Alligator), 2004
- Gettin' Up: Live at Buddy Guy's Legends, Rosa's and Lurrie's Home, with Lurrie Bell (Delmark), 2007

=== With Louisiana Red ===
- Reality Blues (L+R), 1980
- Boy from Black Bayou (L+R), 1983
- My Life (L+R), 1984
- Brothers in Blues (CMA Records), 1993
- Live at 55 (Enja), 1994
- The Blues Masters Bad Case of the Blues (Mojo Tone), 2004

=== Collaborations with other artists ===
- I Feel Good! with John Lee Hooker (Carson, 1970)
- I Wanna Dance All Night with John Lee Hooker (America, 1970)
- 2 Bugs and a Roach with Earl Hooker (Arhoolie, 1969)
- Lake Michigan Ain't No River, with Bob Riedy Blues Band, 1972–1973
- "Unk" in Funk with Muddy Waters (Chess, 1974)
- Just Off Halsted, with Bob Riedy Blues Band (Flying Fish FF 006), 1974
- Blues After Sunrise, with Heinz Sauer and Bob Degen (L+R 40017), 1980
- Harp Attack!, with James Cotton, Junior Wells and Billy Branch (Alligator), 1990
- Delta Bluesman, with Honeyboy Edwards (Earwig 4922), 1991
- Good Candy, with Lovie Lee (Earwig 4928), 1994
- You Can't Take My Blues, with Doug MacLeod (Sledgehammer Blues 2-AQM-1041), 1996
- Blues Blues Blues, with the Jimmy Rogers All Stars (Atlantic), 1998
- Superharps II, with Lazy Lester, Raful Neal and Snooky Pryor (Telarc), 2001
- Family Album, with Wentus Blues Band (Bluelight), 2004
