= Too Slim and the Taildraggers =

American blues rock band

- Origin: Spokane, Washington, United States
- Genre: Blues rock
- Years active: 1986–present
- Labels: Burnside, Underworld
- Members: Tim "Too Slim" Langford; Robert Kearns; Jeffrey "Shakey" Fowlkes
- Past members: Polly O'Keary; Tommy Cook; Tom Brimm; John Cage; Dave Nordstrom; Greg Pendleton
- Website: www.tooslim.org

Too Slim and the Taildraggers is an American blues rock band formed in 1986 in Spokane, Washington, United States. The band has had six albums peak in the top 10 of the Billboard Top Blues Albums. Members currently consist of Tim "Too Slim" Langford (lead vocals, guitar), Robert Kearnes (bass, vocals) and Jeffrey "Shakey" Fowlkes (drums). The band is located in Nashville, Tennessee, United States.

To date, Too Slim and the Taildraggers have released 14 studio albums and five live albums. The Fortune Teller (2007), Free Your Mind (2009), Shiver (2011), Blue Heart (2013), and Blood Moon (2016) all charted in the Top 10 of the Billboard Top Blues Albums, peaking at numbers 9, 5, 9, 3, and 6 respectively.

== Awards ==
The Inland Empire Blues Society named the band "Best Blues Band" for four consecutive years, from 1995-1998, while the albums Swamp Opera and Blues for EB were also named Best Albums. The Cascade Blues Association named them "Best Regional Band" for 11 consecutive years, 1995-1999.

Washington State Blues Society awarded Too Slim and the Taildraggers the Lifetime Achievement Award in 2012; Shiver was nominated for the category Rock Blues Album at the Blues Music Awards in the same year.

== Membership ==
=== Current members ===
Name	Instrument
Tim "Too Slim" Langford	Lead vocals, guitar
Zach Kasik	Bass, vocals
Jeffrey "Shakey" Fowlkes	Drums

=== Past members ===
Name	Instrument
Eric Hanson	Bass, Vocals
E. Scott Esbeck	Bass, Vocals
Polly O' Keary	Bass, Vocals
Tommy Cook	Drums
Zach T. Cooper	Drums
Dave Nordstrom	Bass, Vocals
Greg Pendleton	Sax
John Cage	Drums
Bill Bancroft	Drums
Tom Brimm	Bass

== Discography ==
=== Studio albums ===
Year	Album	Peak chart positions	
Year	Album	US Blues	US Heatseekers
1988	Swingin in the Underworld	x	x
1990	Rock 'em Dead	x	x
1992	El Rauncho Grundgé	x	—
1995	Swamp Opera	x	—
1997	Blues for EB	—	—
2000	King Size Troublemakers	—	—
2003	Tales of Sin and Redemption	—	—
2007	The Fortune Teller	9	—
2009	Free Your Mind	5	—
2011	Shiver	9	—
2013	Blue Heart	3	37
2014	Anthology	—	—
2016	Blood Moon	6	—
2018	High Desert Heat	4	—
2020	The Remedy	NA	—
"—" denotes releases that did not chart. "×" denotes periods where charts did not exist. "NA" denotes releases where the chart position is unknown.

=== Live albums ===
Title	Year
Wanted Live!	1994
Bootleg Series Vol. 1	1999
Goin' Public	2002
Beer & Barbecue Chips	2005
Time To Live	2007
Brace Yourself	2022

=== Compilation albums ===
Title	Year
Lucky 13	2005
Anthology	2014
