= Johnny Shines =

American blues musician (1915–1992)

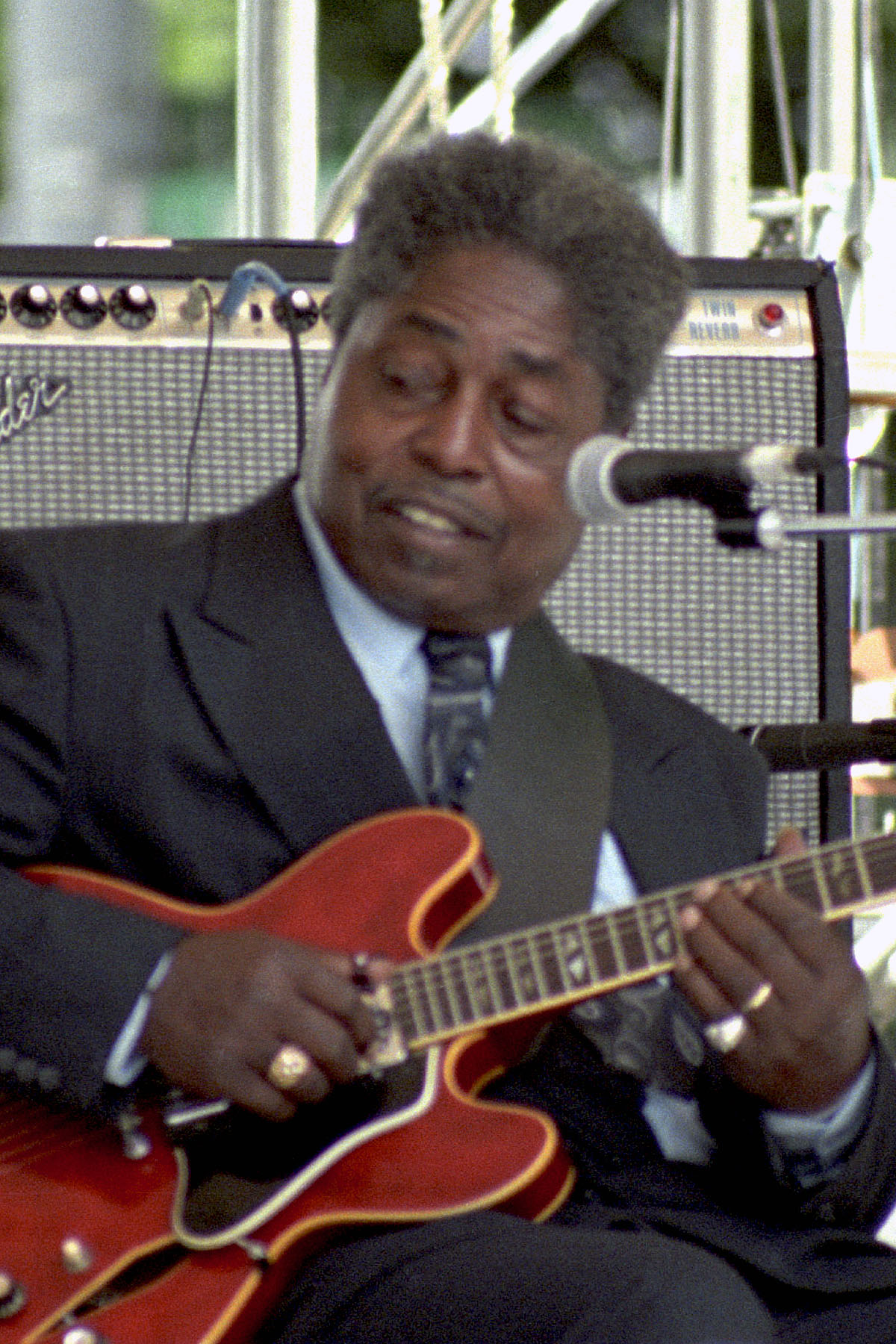
- Shines performing at the 1991 Chicago Blues Festival

Background information
- Born: John Ned Shines; April 25, 1915; Frayser, Tennessee, U.S.
- Died: April 20, 1992 (aged 76) Tuscaloosa, Alabama, U.S.
- Genre: Blues
- Instruments: Guitar; vocals
- Years active: 1932–1992
- Labels: Chess; J.O.B.; Vanguard; Earth Libraries

John Ned Shines (April 25, 1915 – April 20, 1992) was an American blues singer and guitarist.

== Biography ==
Shines was born in Frayser, Tennessee, today a neighborhood of Memphis. He was taught to play the guitar by his mother and spent most of his childhood in Memphis, playing slide guitar at an early age in juke joints and on the street. He moved to Hughes, Arkansas, in 1932 and worked on farms for three years, putting aside his music career. A chance meeting with Robert Johnson, his greatest influence, gave him the inspiration to return to music. In 1935, Shines began traveling with Johnson, touring in the United States and Canada. They parted in 1937, one year before Johnson's death.

Shines played throughout the southern United States until 1941, when he settled in Chicago. There he found work in the construction industry but continued to play in local bars.

He made his first recording in 1946 for Columbia Records, but the takes were never released. He recorded for Chess Records in 1950, but again no records were released. He kept playing with blues musicians in the Chicago area for several more years. In 1952, Shines recorded what is considered his best work, for J.O.B. Records. The recordings were a commercial failure, and Shines, frustrated with the music industry, sold his equipment and returned to working in construction.

In 1966, Vanguard Records found Shines taking photographs in a Chicago blues club, and he recorded tracks for the third volume of Chicago/The Blues/Today!. The album became a blues classic, and it brought Shines into the mainstream music scene. Shines toured with the Chicago All Stars alongside Lee Jackson, Big Walter Horton and Willie Dixon.

Shines moved to Holt, Alabama, in Tuscaloosa County, in 1969. Natalie Mattson, a student at the University of Alabama, learned that he was living in the area and invited him to play at a campus coffee house, the Down Under, which she ran. Shines played there on several occasions and brought his friend, blues artist Mississippi Fred McDowell, to perform with him. These were some of his earliest appearances in Alabama after his move there. He continued to play the international blues circuit while living in Holt.

"Born in 1915, Shines is the most vigorous surviving practitioner of acoustic Delta blues. With his intense vibrato, his observant, imaginative, yet tradition-soaked lyrics, and his incomparable slide guitar, he ought to be recorded once a year by the Library of Congress."

— Christgau's Record Guide: Rock Albums of the Seventies (1981)

In the late 1960s and 1970s, Shines toured with Robert Lockwood, Jr., Robert Johnson's stepson, another one of the last living original Delta blues musicians. In 1980, Shines's career was brought to a standstill when he suffered a stroke. He later appeared and played in the 1991 documentary The Search for Robert Johnson. His final album, Back to the Country, with accompaniment by Snooky Pryor and Johnny Nicholas, won a W. C. Handy Award.

In 1989, Shines met Kent DuChaine, and the two of them toured for the next several years, until Shines's death.

Shines died on April 20, 1992, in Tuscaloosa, Alabama. He was inducted into the Blues Hall of Fame later the same year.

According to the music journalist Tony Russell,

Shines was that rare being, a blues artist who overcame age and rustiness to make music that stood up beside the work of his youth. When Shines came back to the blues in 1965 he was 50, yet his voice had the leonine power of a dozen years before, when he made records his reputation was based on.

== Discography ==
- Last Night's Dream (Warner Bros. Records, 1968)
- Johnny Shines: Blues Masters vol. 7 (Blue Horizon Records, recorded May 1968)
- Johnny Shines with Big Walter Horton (Testament Records, 1969)
- Willie Dixon: I Am the Blues (November 1969)
- Standing at the Crossroads (Testament, 1970)
- Sittin' on Top of the World (Biograph Records, 1972)
- Chicago Blues Festival 1972 (Black & Blue Records, 1973)
- Johnny Shines & Co. (Biograph, 1973)
- Johnny Shines (Advent Records, 1974)
- Too Wet to Plow (Blue Labor Records, 1977)
- Hey Ba-Ba-Re-Bop! (Rounder Records, 1978)
- To Wet To Plow (Tomato Records, 1989)
- Back to the Country (Blind Pig Records, 1991)
- Traditional Delta Blues (Biograph, 1991)
- Mr. Cover Shaker (Biograph, 1992)
- Skull & Crossbones Blues (High Tone, 2003)
- Johnny Shines: The Blues Came Falling Down - Live 1973 (Omnivore Recordings, 2019)
- I Don't Know b/w "32-20 Blues" (Live at Old Town Music Hall, September 15, 1979) (Earth Libraries, 2025)

== See also ==
- Chicago Blues Festival
- J.O.B. Records discography
- List of blues musicians
- List of Chicago blues musicians
- List of Delta blues musicians
- List of slide guitarists
