= Big Walter Horton =

American blues harmonica player (1921–1981)

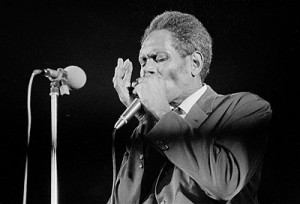

Background information
- Also known as: Shakey Horton; Mumbles Horton; Tangle Eye; Shakey Head; Mumbles
- Born: Walter Horton; April 6, 1921; Horn Lake, Mississippi, U.S.
- Origin: Memphis, Tennessee, U.S.
- Died: December 8, 1981 (aged 60) Chicago, Illinois, U.S.
- Genres: Blues; Chicago blues
- Occupations: Musician; singer
- Instrument: Harmonica
- Years active: Late 1930s–1980
- Labels: Okeh; Cobra; Vocalion; States; Ace; Alligator; Blind Pig

Walter Horton (April 6, 1921 – December 8, 1981), known as Big Walter (Horton) or Walter "Shakey" Horton, was an American blues harmonica player. A quiet, unassuming, shy man, he is remembered as one of the premier harmonica players in the history of blues. Willie Dixon once called Horton 'the best harmonica player I ever heard'.

Robert Palmer named him as 'one of the three great harmonica soloists of modern blues with the two others being cited as Little Walter and Sonny Boy Williamson II. Also known as 'Mumbles', 'Shakey', along with 'Tangle Eye' and 'Shakey Head' (because of his head motion whilst playing the harmonica, along with his suffering from nystagmus). Horton was known for his unique tongue-blocking techniques and tone.

== Biography ==
=== 1920s ===
Horton was born in Horn Lake, Mississippi. He claimed to be born in 1917, but his birth date is often cited as April 6, 1918. Various sources give the year as 1917 or 1921, although it is most likely he was born in 1921. He was playing the harmonica by the time he was five years old when his father gave him a harmonica as a gift. Horton dropped out of school at the age of seven. In his early teens, he lived in Memphis, Tennessee after moving there with his parents. He claimed that his earliest recordings were done there in the late 1920s with the Memphis Jug Band, but there is no documentation of them, and he would have been around six years old at the time of the recording sessions that took place in 1926, so this was likely fabricated by Horton.

=== 1930s ===
In the 1930s he played with numerous blues performers in the Mississippi Delta region. Horton had already started playing on the streets for tips and the like. Johnny Shines, a childhood friend of Horton's, said, 'I met Walter, really, in 1930, and he would be sitting on the porch, blowing in tin cans, you know, and he'd get sounds out of those things'. Horton likely spent a short period of time in Chicago in 1938. It is generally accepted that he was first recorded in Memphis, backing the guitarist Little Buddy Doyle on Doyle's recordings for Okeh Records and Vocalion Records in 1939. These recordings were acoustic duets, in a style popularized by Sleepy John Estes and his harmonicist Hammie Nixon, among others. It can be heard—upon listening to players such as Hammie Nixon—that Horton was heavily influenced by such earlier styles of harmonica playing. On these recordings, Horton's style was not yet fully realized, but there were clear hints of what was to come.

=== 1940s ===
Horton eventually stopped playing the harmonica for a living, because of poor health (possibly tuberculosis), and worked mainly outside the music industry in the 1940s. He worked as a cook, ice man, and undertaker. Walter Horton also met and gave lessons to harp players James Cotton and Little Walter in the 1940s. Horton is likely to have developed his musical skills during these times, considering the difference between the styles in his recordings from 1939 and those of the 1950s. Horton had a daughter named 'Christine' in 1945 or 1946 (along with five other children born in unknown years). Walter started playing again in 1948, and then recording in 1951 and onwards.

=== 1950s ===
By the early 1950s, Horton was recording again (his first recordings of the decade being in 1951). Horton recorded with Joe Hill Louis in 1951. Horton was invited by Eddie Taylor to join Jimmy Reed's band in 1952, so he moved to Chicago. A couple of weeks after arriving, however, he was invited to join Muddy Waters' blues band when Junior Wells was drafted into the army at the end of 1952. Horton replaced him long enough to record on one session in January 1953. Horton was fired from the band by the end of 1953, likely due to his drinking and/or unreliability, and replaced by Henry 'Pot' Strong. After being fired from the Muddy Waters band, Walter moved back to Memphis and recorded again with Sam Phillips at Sun Studio. Horton was among the first to be recorded by Philips for Sun Records in Memphis. For his recordings for Sun, Horton was accompanied by the young pianist Phineas Newborn, Jr., who later was a well-known jazz pianist. Horton's instrumental track "Easy", recorded around this time, was based on Ivory Joe Hunter's "I Almost Lost My Mind". During the early 1950s he appeared on the Chicago blues scene, frequently playing with Memphis and Delta musicians who had also moved north, including the guitarists Eddie Taylor and Johnny Shines. Horton went back to Chicago in 1954. In 1956, Horton recorded "Walking By Myself", with Jimmy Rogers for Chess; some consider his solo in this song the best he ever recorded.

=== 1960s ===
Horton was active in the Chicago blues scene during the 1960s, as blues music gained popularity with white audiences. From the early 1960s onward, he recorded and frequently performed as a sideman with Taylor, Shines, Johnny Young, Sunnyland Slim, Willie Dixon and many others. Horton recorded his first solo album in 1964 as he was mainly known as a backing musician.

In October 1968, whilst touring the U.K., he recorded the album Southern Comfort with the guitarist Martin Stone (previously with Savoy Brown and later a member of Mighty Baby). In 1969, Walter recorded Johnny Shines with Big Walter Horton, where some of his best third position playing can be heard (on "Sneakin' and Hidin' - Part 2"). Along with this, Walter also recorded with Johnny Winter, J. B. Hutto and the Hawks, Koko Taylor, Fleetwood Mac, and J. L. Smith in 1969.

=== 1970s ===
Horton toured extensively in places such as Germany, Finland, and England. He toured usually as a backing musician and, in the 1970s, he performed at blues and folk music festivals in the United States and Europe, frequently with Dixon's Chicago All-Stars. He also performed on recordings by blues and rock stars.

In the late 1970s, if in town, Horton played the Sunday matinees at B.L.U.E.S, with Homesick James and Floyd Jones,(who had switched from guitar to bass), and he toured the United States with James, Guido Sinclair, Eddie Taylor, Richard Molina, Bradley Pierce Smith and Paul Nebenzahl, and he performed on National Public Radio broadcasts. Two of the compilation albums of his work are Mouth-Harp Maestro and Fine Cuts. Also notable is the album Big Walter Horton with Carey Bell, released by Alligator Records in 1972. He worked at blues festivals and often performed at the Maxwell Street market in Chicago. In 1977, he played on the Muddy Waters album I'm Ready, produced by Johnny Winter. He also recorded for Blind Pig Records during this period.

=== 1980s ===
Horton accompanied John Lee Hooker in the 1980 film The Blues Brothers, although in the film his playing is actually overdubbed by Joe Berson, as Horton was reportedly undone by the tedious cinematic process of multiple takes and abandoned the set. His final recordings were made in 1980. Horton died of heart failure in Chicago in 1981, at the age of 60, in a neighbor's apartment. Horton's death certificate also mentioned acute alcoholism.

== Legacy ==
Horton contributed to the blues traditions of Memphis and Chicago. His harmonica technique influenced many later blues musicians.

Horton was posthumously inducted into the Blues Hall of Fame in 1982.

In 2008, Horton was honored with a marker on the Mississippi Blues Trail in Horn Lake.

== Other information ==
Walter Horton has a daughter named Christine, who has children herself. Walter also named and recorded a song (in a similar style to "Louise") for her in his 1970 album, Big Walter Horton with Carey Bell. Horton was known to often tell tall tales, and would give lessons to his admirers. Horton always used Hohner Marine Band harmonicas.

Horton's mother was Emma McNaire Horton, his father was Albert Horton, and he had six children and 8 grandchildren at the time of his death. Many of his relatives outlived him, including his parents. His wife was Fannie Horton.

He lived in near-poverty for most of his life. This was due to the fact that he was ignored by record companies and radio stations during his later life, without regular band or regular income. Like many of his peers, he lived on a meagre income during much of his career and endured racial discrimination in the racially segregated U.S. He lived in apartments most of his life; Bob Corritore said, “One time I went to Walter’s apartment to pick him up. It was a broken down rise made of wood and it appeared that he had a lot of family living there.”

Timeline of residency (references and the like in biography).

1921—1926: Horn Lake, Mississippi.

1927—1937/38: Memphis, Tennessee. Horton also moved through Arkansas at some point around this time.

1938: Chicago, Illinois.

1938/39—1952: Memphis, Tennessee. Recorded with Little Buddy Doyle in 1939 and then with Sam Phillips at Sun Records in 1951.

1952-1953: Chicago, Illinois. Joined Muddy Water's band during 1953 before being fired, periodically thereafter moving to Memphis to record again with Sam Phillips.

1953: Memphis, Illinois.

1954—1981: Chicago, Illinois. Moved permanently to Chicago in 1954. Occasionally visiting Memphis in later years.

== Discography ==
Album	Artists	Label	Notes
The Soul of Blues Harmonica	Horton.	Argo	1964
Chicago Blues	Johnny Young, Horton.	Arhoolie	1968
Johnny Shines with Big Walter Horton	Johnny Shines, Horton.	Testament	1969
Big Walter Horton with Carey Bell	Horton, Carey Bell.	Alligator	1972
Sad and Lonesome	Sunnyland Slim, Eddie Shaw, Horton.	Jewel	1972
Walter Shakey Horton with Hot Cottage	Horton, Hot Cottage.	Stony Plain	1974, recorded in Canada.
Fine Cuts	Horton.	Blind Pig	1977
Old Friends Together for the First Time	Horton, David "Honeyboy" Edwards, Kansas City Red, Floyd Jones, Sunnyland Slim.	Earwig	1981, Horton played harmonica on three tracks
Big Walter "Shakey" Horton Toronto '73	Horton.	M.I.L. Multimedia	1998
