= Earwig Music Company =

American blues and jazz record label

- Founded: 1978
- Founder: Michael Frank
- Distributors: Burnside Distribution Corporation (US), Parsifal bvba, Belgium (Europe)
- Genre: Blues, jazz
- Country of origin: United States
- Location: Chicago, Illinois
- Official website: www.earwigmusic.com

Earwig Music Company is an American blues and jazz independent record label, founded by Michael Frank in October 1978 in Chicago.

From 1975 until 1977 Frank was employed by the Jazz Record Mart, like Bruce Iglauer of Alligator Records and Jim O'Neal of Living Blues magazine.

Since its founding, Earwig Music has issued 66 albums, 51 produced by Frank, among them the last recordings of Louis Myers, Maxwell Street Jimmy Davis, and Willie Johnson.

Other artists on the label include blues musicians The Jelly Roll Kings (with Frank Frost), Honeyboy Edwards, Johnny Drummer, Big Jack Johnson, Jimmy Dawkins, Louisiana Red, Willie Kent, H-Bomb Ferguson, Sunnyland Slim, Little Brother Montgomery, Jim Brewer, Homesick James, John Primer, Lil' Ed Williams, Lester Davenport, Kansas City Red, Scott Ellison, and Liz Mandeville; jazz musicians Carl Arter and Tiny Irvin; the Gospel Trumpets; and folk storytellers Jackie Torrence, Alice McGill, Laura Simms, and Bobby Norfolk.

The storytellers' Earwig recordings won the American Library Association Parents2 Choice and NAIRD Awards.

Earwig released four albums by the Chicago blues duo, Chris James and Patrick Rynn.

In 1998, Johnny "Yard Dog" Jones won a W. C. Handy Award for Best New Artist for the album, Ain't Gonna Worry.

In 2008, Frank received the Blues Foundation's Keeping the Blues Alive Award (Manager).
