= Testament Records (United States) =

American record label

Testament Records was an American independent record label based in Philadelphia, later Chicago, then Pasadena. Founded in 1963 by Down Beat magazine editor and writer Pete Welding, the label specialized in American roots music, releasing some thirty LPs — mainly blues, but also gospel, country and jazz albums until 1977.

Artists recording for the label included David "Honeyboy" Edwards, Sleepy John Estes, J. B. Hutto, Floyd Jones, Mississippi Fred McDowell, Robert Nighthawk, Doctor Ross, Johnny Shines, Otis Spann, Bud Spires, Eddie Taylor, Big Joe Williams, Johnny "Man" Young, and the Piedmont bluesman Carl Martin, who recorded for Testament in the mid-1960s, after having been inactive as a musician for many years. Testament also released important compilations, such as a collection of topical songs on the death of President John F. Kennedy, and also a collection of historic and contemporary fife and drum band recordings.

In 1994, the Testament catalog was acquired by Hightone Records, which reissued almost all the Testament albums on CD, adding previously unissued bonus tracks where available.

== See also ==
- List of record labels
