= Johnny "Man" Young =

American blues singer, mandolin player and guitarist (1917–1974)

Johnny Young
- Johnny Young playing his mandolin

Background information
- Born: January 1, 1917; Vicksburg, Mississippi, U.S.
- Died: April 18, 1974 (aged 56) Chicago, Illinois, U.S.
- Genres: Blues
- Instruments: Vocals, mandolin, guitar
- Years active: 1930s–1974

Johnny "Man" Young (January 1, 1917 – April 18, 1974) was an American blues singer, mandolin player, and guitarist, significant as one of the first of the new generation of electric blues artists to record in Chicago after the Second World War. He was one of the few mandolin players active in blues music in the postwar era. His nickname, Man, came from his playing the mandolin.

== Life and career ==
Young was born in Vicksburg, Mississippi, and played in string bands in Mississippi in the 1930s. He also claimed to have worked with Sleepy John Estes in Tennessee before moving to Chicago in 1940. By 1943, he was working with John Lee "Sonny Boy" Williamson and Muddy Waters. In the late 1940s he became a regular player on Maxwell Street, often with his cousin, the guitarist Johnny Williams, and in clubs with Williams and Little Walter. His first recording was made in 1947 for the Ora Nelle label, featuring Young singing "Money Taking Woman" on the A-side, accompanied by Williams, who sang "Worried Man Blues" on the B-side. For a second session in late 1948, Young and Williams were joined by Snooky Pryor on harmonica and recorded a single for the Planet label, released under the name Man Young. A later session, for J.O.B. Records, was unissued. Young played guitar behind Snooky Pryor in a session for Vee-Jay, but he later retired from performance in the 1950s.

With the rise of interest in blues among white audiences in the early 1960s, Young emerged from retirement in 1963 and recorded for several labels, including Vanguard, Testament, Arhoolie and Blue Horizon, in the 1960s and early 1970s. Young toured in Europe in 1972, when he was part of the American Folk Blues Festival.

Young died of a heart attack, in Chicago, in 1974, and is buried in Lincoln Cemetery, in Urbana, Illinois.

== Discography ==
=== Singles ===
- 1947: "Money Taking Woman" / "Worried Man Blues" (Ora Nelle 712)
- 1948: "My Baby Walked Out" / "Let Me Ride Your Mule" (Planet 2/Old Swing-Master 19)
- 1964: "All I Want For Breakfast" / "Humpty Dumpty" (USA Records 768)
- 1966: "Slam Hammer" / "Wild, Wild Woman" (Arhoolie 515)

=== Albums ===
- 1966: Johnny Young and His Chicago Blues Band (Arhoolie)
- 1967: Chicago/The Blues/Today!, vol. 3 (Vanguard, with Johnny Shines)
- 1968: Chicago Blues (Arhoolie)
- 1970: Fat Mandolin (Blue Horizon, reissued in 1972 as Blues Masters Vol. 9)
- 1973: I Can't Keep My Foot from Jumping (Bluesway)
- 1975: Johnny Young and His Friends (Testament)

=== As sideman ===
with Snooky Pryor

- 1956: "Someone to Love Me" / "Judgment Day" (Vee Jay)

with Otis Spann

- 1966: Otis Spann's Chicago Blues (Testament)
