= Pierre Lacocque =

American blues harmonica player

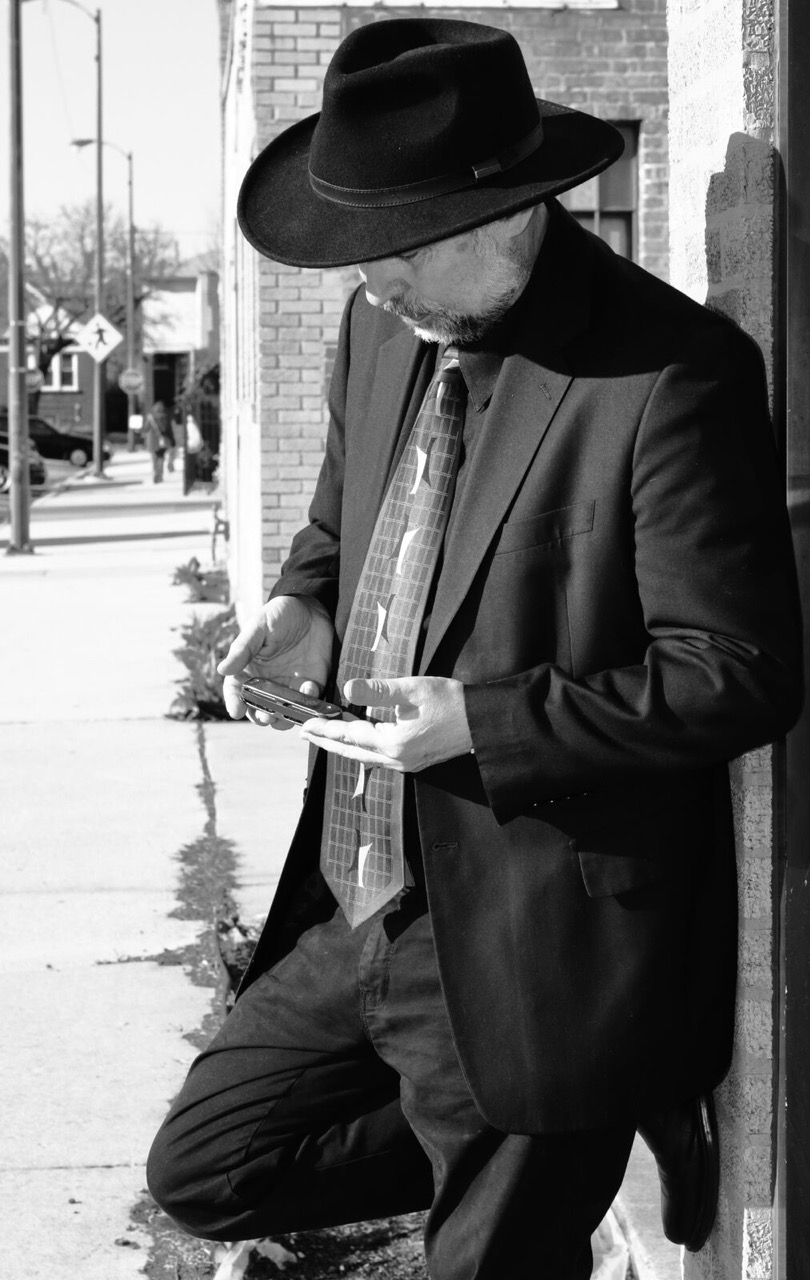
- Pierre Lacocque at Delmark Records in 2016

Background information
- Born: Pierre-Emmanuel Lacocque; October 13, 1952 (age 73); Jerusalem, Israel
- Origin: Chicago, Illinois, United States
- Genres: Chicago blues; Delta blues; Calypso; Boogie; Latin blues; Boogie-woogie; Swing
- Occupations: Musician; songwriter; composer; producer; bandleader
- Instrument: Harmonica
- Years active: 1989–present
- Labels: Delmark Records; CrossCut Records; Van der Linden Recordings
- Website: mississippiheat.net

Pierre Lacocque is an acclaimed and internationally renowned American blues harmonica player. His style has been influenced by the post-WWII Chicago blues tradition, and he was inducted into the Chicago Blues Hall of Fame in October 2017.

He entered the Chicago scene in the late 1980s when, among other bands, he performed with The Blue Knights led by Tré, Doug McDonald and the Blue Mirror Band and Lawrence "Lil" Sonny Wimberly and his band, The Blues Invaders. In late 1991, he and his brother, Michel Lacocque (the band manager) founded Mississippi Heat with three other musicians. It was originally a quartet composed of guitarist-singer Jon McDonald, bassist Bob Stroger, drummer-singer Robert Covington and Pierre Lacocque, harmonicist and bandleader. Lacocque has since been Mississippi Heat's leader, harmonica player, producer, and primary composer and songwriter for the group.

Mississippi Heat's slogan and mission statement is "Traditional Blues with a Unique Sound." The band's new recording Madeleine (Van der Linden Records) was released in 2021, following Cab Driving Man (2016, DE 848) and Warning Shot (2014, DE 839), both on Delmark Records.

== Biography ==
=== Early childhood and adolescence ===
Pierre-Emmanuel Lacocque was born in Jerusalem, Israel, on October 13, 1952 to Protestant Belgian parents. His father, a Judeo-Christian scholar, travelled extensively in his early career. By 1957, Pierre Lacocque had lived in four countries, having spent two years in Germany, three in France, and finally returning to Belgium. From 1962–1963, during his 5th grade year, his family spent another year in Jerusalem.

Lacocque's father, to whom he has become very close, valued intellectual pursuits in the fields of Judeo-Christian theology, philosophy, and classical literature. The musician said in a 2014 interview that although it was “amazing” to have the “privilege” to read intellectual and classical texts, “it did not match who I was mentally.”

The school he attended while living in Brussels also had a big impact on him. His identity crisis was fueled by the fact that he and his siblings Elisabeth (four years younger) and Michel (19 months older) also attended the Athénée Maimonide, a Jewish Orthodox School. This was a choice his parents and paternal grandfather made in response to the anti-Semitism they had witnessed during World War II. Both parents and their families had had eye opening, transforming, and in some cases, tragic experiences during World War II.

As Lacocque and his siblings were the only non-Jews at the school, he often felt out of place for being a Christian, adding to a feeling of loneliness and isolation. In his interview with Lehmann, he said, "It made sense that I eventually asked myself, 'Who am I really?' Not only psychologically speaking, but also religiously." Lacocque says he never lost the deep connection to Judaism he was exposed to, both at home and at school, and would later find solace in Judeo-Christian philosophy and theology.

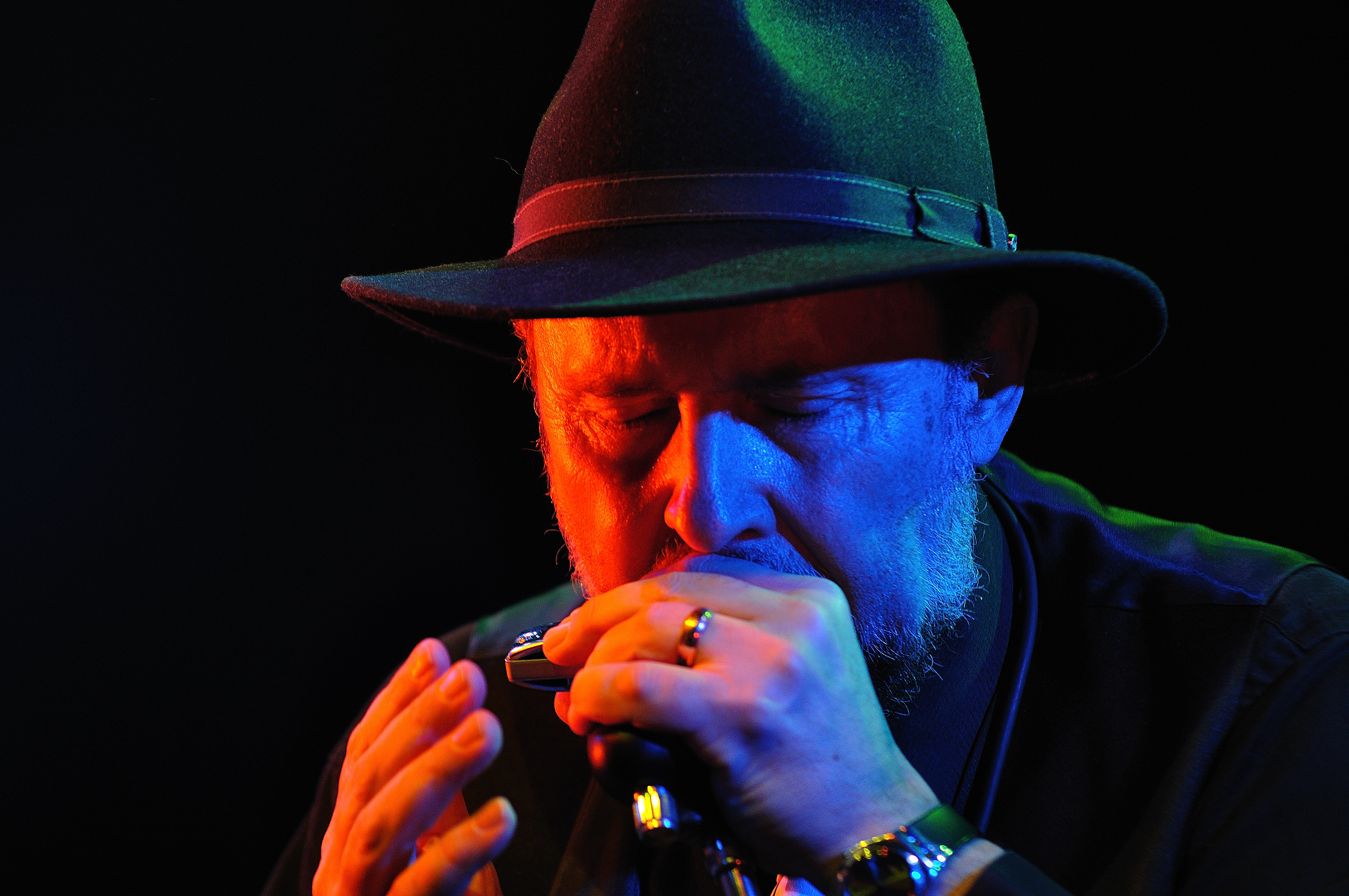
Mississippi Heat band leader Pierre Lacocque at the North Atlantic Blues Festival in Rockland, Maine.

Two key childhood events led Pierre Lacocque toward music. First, as a young child living in Neuviller-la Roche, a mountain village in the Alsatian region of France, his father gave him a green plastic harmonica. Blowing through the plastic toy gave him immense emotion. The second came in the mid-1960s, when his father, returning from a trip to India, brought him a Hohner Marine Band harmonica. "I was moved, but not driven to master it," he said later in an interview with Harmonica.com. In an interview with WBEZ's Niles Frantz, he said that, "during my pre-Chicago years I loved the harmonica but did not know deep blue notes could be played on them."

Finally, in 1969, when his family moved to Chicago's Hyde Park for his father's new teaching appointment at the Chicago Theological Seminary, Lacocque had a deeply influential experience. On a late summer Saturday night, while about to enter as a junior at the University of Chicago Laboratory Schools, he heard harp maestro Big Walter Horton playing at the University of Chicago's Ida Noyes Hall.

"I often say it was an experience of awe, but also, it was like a religious experience," he said in his 2014 interview with Kerzner. "My life had a meaning right there. Oh my goodness! I couldn't believe ... the depth of those (horn-like) sounds that Big Walter produced! The sound! He played through an amplifier, and I was very moved. It really changed me. It gave me oxygen."

The following Monday, Pierre had bought himself a Hohner Marine Band harmonica. Lacocque then began an intense period of discovery and practice which included buying many records and listening to top recording artists like Little Walter, Big Walter Horton, Paul Butterfield, and Junior Wells, among many others. He decided to go to as many live performances as possible, some of these by James Cotton, Louis Myers, Carey Bell, Howlin' Wolf, Charlie Musselwhite and Paul Oscher with the Muddy Waters band. He practiced up to 7 or 8 hours a day for years following this experience.

He and his brother Michel went to hear Junior Wells at the now-closed Theresa's Lounge on 48th and Indiana Avenue on Chicago's South Side. He met Wells many times during this period and saw him as his first and lasting mentor. "From the beginning, it was Junior Wells who embraced me with open arms and gave me his blessing," he recalled in 2014. "It is as though he was saying, 'Pierre, you belong here with us.'"

In a 1998 interview with Frantz, Lacocque recalled, "I would never have gone to Theresa's had it not been for my brother Michel's encouragements. I was too shy to do that on my own. Michel saw something in the new me he appreciated. He could see that my chronic internal struggles and sadness were transcended through my musical inspirations. I think he was moved by that early on. He still is today".

=== College years and intellectual phase: Montreal and Chicago (1970–1988) ===
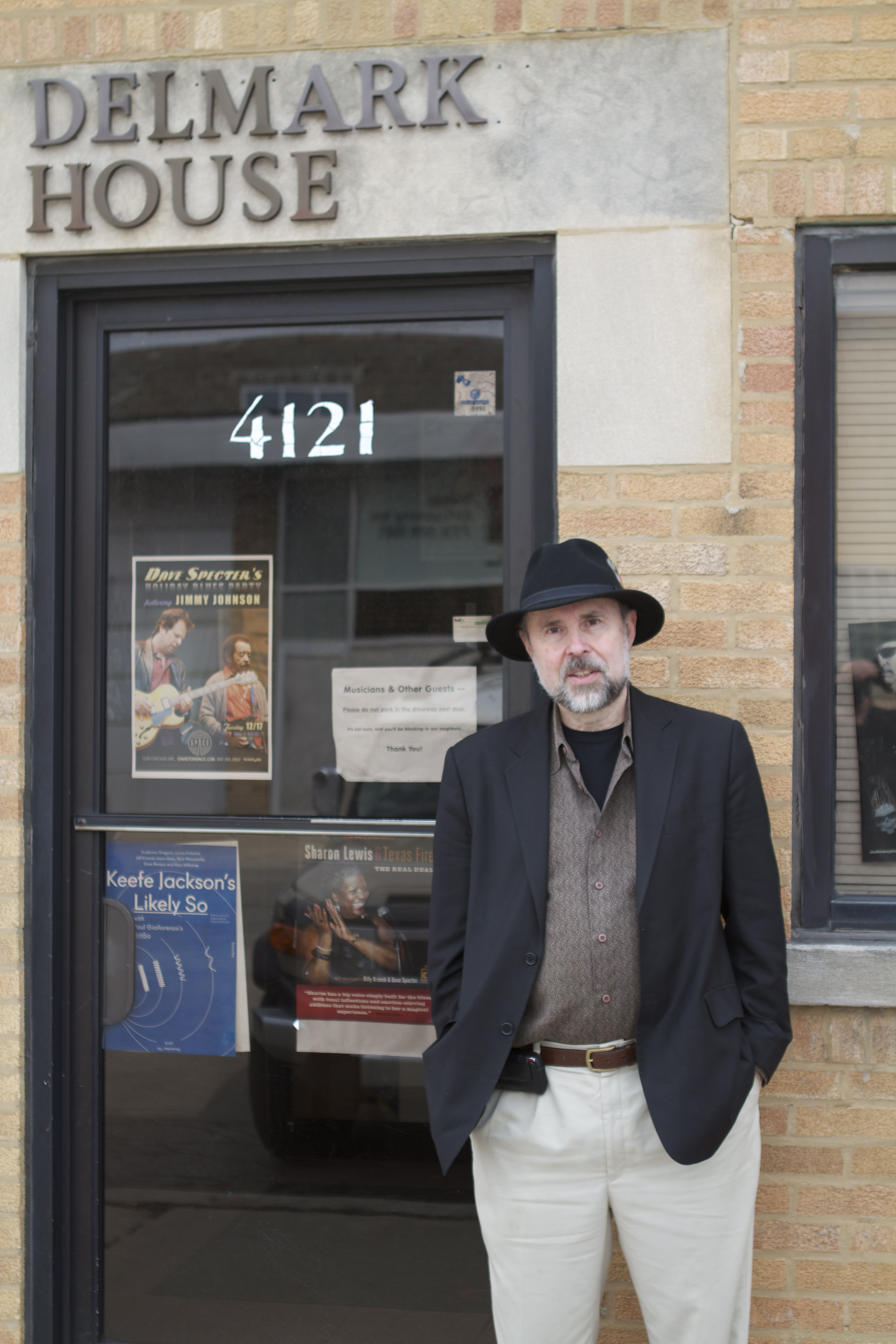
Mississippi Heat band leader Pierre Lacocque in front of Delmark Records' Riverside Studio in Chicago, March 2014.

What followed was a passionate musical period for Pierre. By 1976, he'd completed undergraduate and master's degrees in psychology at McGill University, in Montreal, Canada. While in Montreal, he first joined the Albert Failey Blues Band, and later Oven, a blues-rock band he would play in until 1975. That year, Oven won the a Battle of the Bands with a promise of a record release that never came through. This coincided with a personal crisis for Lacocque.

What was once an exhilarating experience drove him into deep depression and despair. "I suffered from severe anxieties, panic attacks, and despair ... Playing the blues at that time was two-fold: Incredibly pleasing and incredibly devastating," Lacocque said in a 1998 interview. So, in 1975, after six years of intense playing, he stopped cold turkey. He recalls that music at that point was opening him too much and he did not have the tools yet to deal with the darkness it led him to.

He began an intense and salutary period of intellectual pursuit. He first began reading Jewish and Christian existentialists and philosophers he had heard about during his childhood. For him, it was a way of practicing the art of expressing himself with words, reconnecting with his family's background, and dealing with his personal crisis. Lacocque spent the next fourteen years studying psychology and publishing.

"It was absolutely beneficial," Lacocque said in a 2014 interview. "Given my family context, and all this heavy reading. Eventually, I made a decision and I went into music (wholeheartedly again) but, I also said, 'You know what? I want to read about what is the meaning of life. So I studied existentialists for a long time, and I followed a path that was exciting: going to school, writing papers, formulating my thinking, and reading other people."

By 1978, Lacocque had earned a PhD in counseling and clinical psychology from Northwestern University. His dissertation title was: "Meaning in life: Healthy and Pathological Aspects." From then until 1989, he worked full-time as a psychotherapist and continued researching and publishing. Among his most notable publications is a 1981 book entitled "The Jonah Complex," which he wrote with his father, André Lacocque. The book was extensively revised and updated in 1990 under the title "Jonah: A Psycho-Religious approach to the Prophet."

=== Return to Chicago blues and Mississippi Heat (1988–present) ===
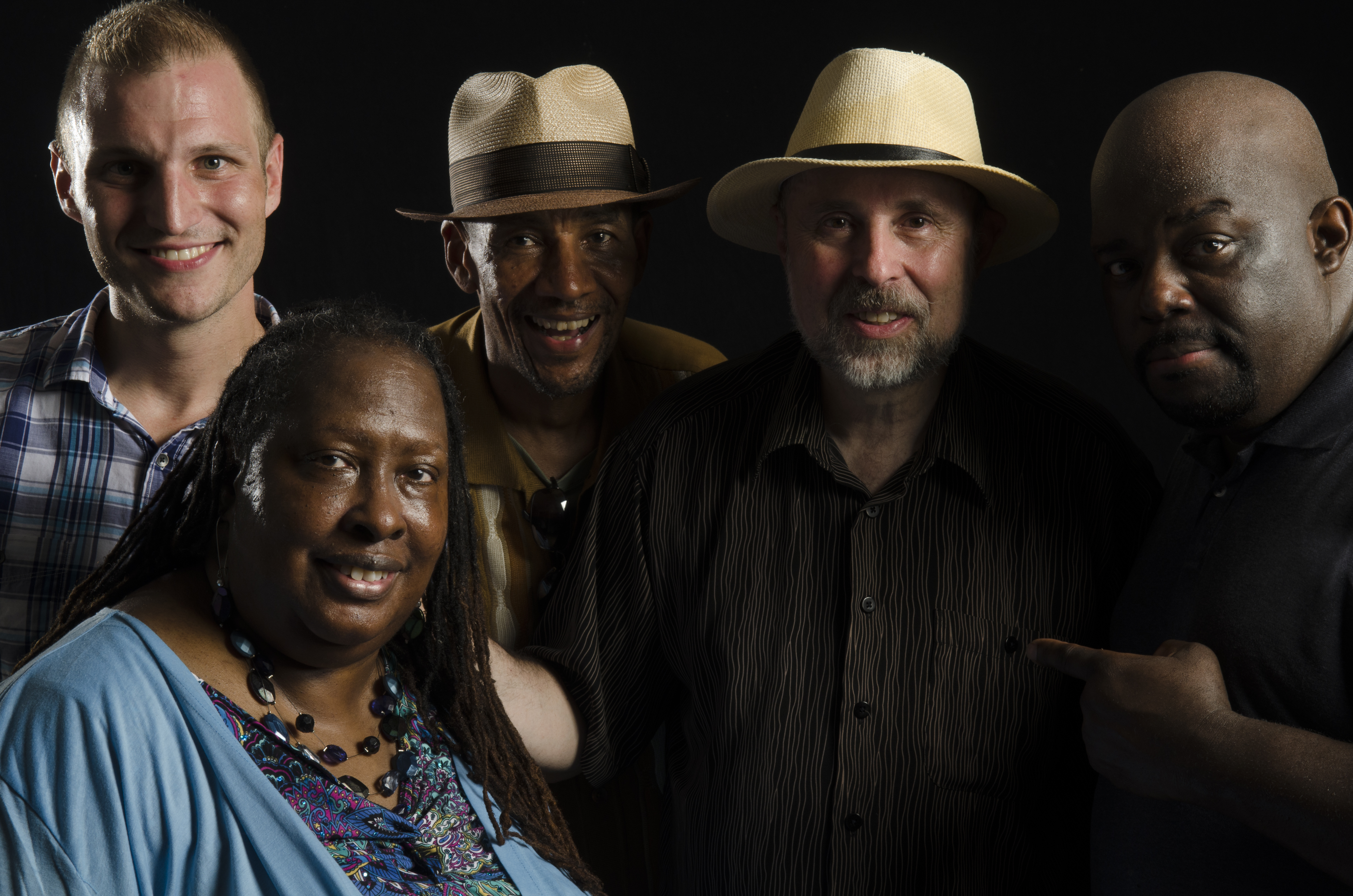
Pierre Lacocque with Mississippi Heat in Switzerland, June 2016

By 1988, Lacocque recalls, he hit his bottom. He felt he was emphasizing his intellectual side at the expense of another vibrant, spontaneous childlike side. He wanted to find a healthier equilibrium in life. This is when he went back to the harmonica with an urgent need to create music again.

It is in the blues that Lacocque eventually found lasting stability and a home. In his interview with Lehmann, he said, "And look at me – I'm a white guy, I am a Belgian, I am European. I have a French accent. I come from a conservative, rigid Judeo-Christian background. Both my father and paternal grandfather were Protestant ministers. At first, and even at second glance, I do not belong in the Blues world. And yet, I do so completely. The Blues understands me."

He added, "As I said I now feel at home – certainly at home on a soulful level."

In 1989, Lacocque rejoined the Chicago blues scene. He met Tad Robinson, a Blues harmonica player and soul singer, in Pierre's church in Oak Park, Illinois. Tad was then playing with the Mojo Kings, with pianist Mark Brombach, guitarist Steve Freund, bassist Harlan Terson, and drummer John Hiller. Through Tad, he met many blues musicians. He also met Joe Zaklan whom he joined for gigs at No Exit on Sundays from 1990–1991. There he met Muddy Waters' alumnus bass player and singer Lawrence Lil' Sonny Wimberly. Wimberly was a regular at these gigs as well, and took Lacocque under his wings.

Wimberly and Lacocque often played together at the now-closed U.S. Blues, in Old Town on Wells Street. He also met pianist Carl Snyder, an ex-member of the Lonnie Brooks Band, and drummer Michael Lynn. Lacocque would never forget Wimberly's kindness to him and eventually wrote "Heartbroken" in his honor after his death in 1991. Through these gigs he also met Jon McDonald who would eventually become Mississippi Heat's first guitar player.

After Wimberly's death, Lacocque looked for new musical projects. He joined Tré and the Blue Knights for a while, and then Doug McDonald and the Blue Mirror Band. Eventually, Lacocque grew weary of playing covers and other people's material. He wanted to honor the Chicago blues tradition with his own style. He did not like the idea of repeating what had already been done on the blues harmonica. He also wanted to build his own repertoire of songs.

So, in late 1991, during a performance at Café Lura in Chicago featuring Bob Stroger, Jon McDonald, Robert Covington, and Pierre Lacocque, Lacocque's brother Michel, who had been moved by the music while in the audience, proposed to manage and book the band. The musicians agreed enthusiastically to launch Mississippi Heat. Mississippi Heat was founded in late 1991. With the exception of Bob Stroger and Robert Covington, Billy Flynn and James Wheeler were not the original members of the band. They joined the band soon after it was formed, and appeared on Mississippi Heat's first recording in 1993, Straight From The Heart (Van der Linden Recordings, VR 100). The band evolved over the years with several line-ups and 12 recordings to date. As of 2016, the last six were released on the Delmark Records label.

Of the dynamic ensemble, Living Blues Magazine says, "... by constantly stirring the pot with new ingredients, Pierre Lacocque ensures that Mississippi Heat remains vital."

"We are ... attracted to the traditional Chicago blues and the Chicago blues sound, for sure. But we want to bring something fresh and exciting to the culture as well, come up with new ideas and keep advancing things. You can continue to come up with new things, while also keeping them steeped in tradition ... That's our approach to the blues," Lacocque said in a 2013 interview.

== Recordings ==
| Year | Title | Label | Comments & line-up |
|---|---|---|---|
| 1992 | Straight From the Heart | Van der Linden Records | 13 tracks (11 originals)—Pierre Lacocque, Robert Covington, Billy Flynn, James O. Wheeler, Bob Stroger; Guest stars: Calvin "Fuzz" Jones, Sam Lay |
| 1994 | Learned the Hard Way | Van der Linden Records | 15 tracks (13 originals)—Pierre Lacocque, Deitra Farr, Billy Flynn, James O. Wheeler, Bob Stroger, Alan Kirk |
| 1995 | Thunder in My Heart | Van der Linden Records | 14 tracks (all originals)—Pierre Lacocque, Deitra Farr, Billy Flynn, James O. Wheeler, Bob Stroger, Alan Kirk; Guest stars: Ken Saydak (piano/keys), Michel Lacocque (background vocals on "Natalie") |
| 1998 | Handyman | Van der Linden (1998) & CrossCut Records (1999) | 15 tracks (all originals)—Pierre Lacocque, Katherine Davis, George Baze, Barrelhouse Chuck, Ike Anderson, Kenny Smith; Guest stars: Billy Boy Arnold, Carl Weathersby, Zora Young. Licensed by CrossCut Records in 1999—Two bonus tracks on the 1999 version, with Pierre Lacocque, Chris Winters, Stephen "The Kid" Howard, Jasper Buchanan; Guest stars: Wilbert Crosby, Greg Guliuzza, Bernard "B-NY" Reed, "The Chicago Horns" (Bill McFarland, Phillip Perkins, Sonny Seals), Michael Freeman on tambourine, and Michel Lacocque (finger snaps and handclaps) |
| 2002 | Footprints on the Ceiling | CrossCut Records | 14 tracks (13 originals)—Pierre Lacocque, Inetta Visor, Chris Winters, Stephen "The Kid" Howard, Michael Thomas, Roger Weaver, Kenny Smith; Guest stars: Billy Boy Arnold, Carl Weathersby, Peter "Madcat" Ruth, Phil Baron, Pat Brennan |
| 2005 | Glad You're Mine | CrossCut Records | 12 tracks (9 originals)—Pierre Lacocque, Inetta Visor, Steve Doyle, Chris Winters, Spurling Banks, Kenny Smith; Guest stars: Carl Weathersby, Chris "Hambone" Cameron, Michael Freeman on tambourine, and Michel Lacocque (handclaps) |
| 2005 | One Eye Open | Delmark Records | 11 tracks (5 originals)—Pierre Lacocque, Inetta Visor, Max Valldeneu, Spurling Banks, Kenny Smith; Guest stars: Chris "Hambone" Cameron, Lurrie Bell. Live recording at Rosa's Lounge. Also on DVD with one additional track. |
| 2008 | Hattiesburg Blues | Delmark Records | 13 tracks (12 originals)—Pierre Lacocque, Inetta Visor, Giles Corey, Stephen "The Kid" Howard, Spurling Banks, Kenny Smith; Guest stars: Carl Weathersby, Lurrie Bell, Chris "Hambone" Cameron, Devin Thompson, Ruben Alvarez, "The Chicago Horns" (Bill McFarland, Kenny Anderson, Hank Ford, Willie Henderson), Dujuan Austin |
| 2010 | Let's Live it Up | Delmark Records | 14 tracks (13 originals)—Pierre Lacocque, Inetta Visor, Giles Corey, Stephen "The Kid" Howard, Andrew "Blaze" Thomas, Kenny Smith; Guest stars: Carl Weathersby, John Primer, Ruben Alvarez, Rhonda Preston, Chris "Hambone" Cameron, "The Chicago Horns" (Bill McFarland, Kenny Anderson, Hank Ford, Sam Burckhardt); Background Vocals: Kay Reed, Mae Koen, Vanessa Holmes |
| 2012 | Delta Bound | Delmark Records | 14 tracks (13 originals)—Pierre Lacocque, Inetta Visor, Giles Corey, Billy Satterfield, Joseph Veloz, Kenny Smith; Guest stars: Carl Weathersby, Deitra Farr, Chubby Carrier, Billy Flynn, Chris "Hambone" Cameron, Johnny Iguana |
| 2014 | Warning shot | Delmark Records | 16 tracks (15 originals)—Pierre Lacocque, Inetta Visor, Michael Dotson, Giles Corey, Brian Quinn, Kenny Smith; Guest stars: Carl Weathersby, Sax Gordon, Andrew "Blaze" Thomas, Ruben Alvarez, Joseph Veloz, Neal O'Hara; Background Vocals: Mae Koen, Diane Madison, Nanette Frank |
| 2016 | Cab Driving Man | Delmark Records | 16 tracks (14 originals)—Pierre Lacocque, Inetta Visor, Michael Dotson, Brian Quinn, Terrence Williams; Guest stars: Giles Corey, Ricky Nelson, Kenny Smith, Chris "Hambone" Cameron, Sumito Ariyo, Dave Specter, Ruben Alvarez, Sax Gordon |
| 2021 | Madeleine | Van der Linden Records | 12 tracks (all originals)—Pierre Lacocque, Inetta Visor, Daneshia Hamilton, Michael Dotson, Giles Corey, Brian Quinn, Terrence Williams; Guest stars: Lurrie Bell, Carl Weathersby, Kenny Smith, Chris "Hambone" Cameron, Johnny Iguana, Mark Franklin, Scott Bomar; Background vocals: Nanette Frank, Diane Madison, Mae Koen |
| 2025 | Don't Look Back | Delmark Records | 14 tracks (all originals)—Pierre Lacocque, Sheryl Youngblood, Inetta Visor, Daneshia Hamilton, Giles Corey, Big Mike Perez, Brian Quinn; Guest stars: Danielle Nicole, Omar Coleman, Billy Flynn, Johnny Iguana, John Kattke, Kenny Smith, Mark Franklin, Kirk Smothers, Anthony Alexander, Natalie Bennison; Background vocals: Nanette Frank, Diane Madison, Mae Koen |

== Events ==
- Chicago Blues Festival (US). Mississippi Heat has often appeared at this festival, most recently in 2018.
- Lucerne Blues Festival (Switzerland), 2014, 2000, 1996, 1995. A live recording was made in 1996 but has not been released.
- Montreal International Jazz Festival (Canada). The band has been a headliner at this festival on numerous occasions. It played there for the first time in 1994, in front of an audience of 27,000. Its last appearance at the festival was in 2013.
- Ecaussinnes Spring Blues Festival (Belgium). Mississippi Heat has performed at the festival many times, beginning in 1994. Its first appearance drew Belgian TV and a private movie crew to capture the band on film.
- Caracas International Music Festival (Venezuela)
- Notodden Blues Fest (Norway)

Among other countries, Pierre and his band, Mississippi Heat, have also performed in: Austria, Croatia, England, Finland, France, Germany, Greece, Hungary, Luxembourg, Mexico, Netherlands, Poland, Serbia, Slovenia, Spain, Tunisia, and Turkey.

== Media and film ==
Pierre Lacocque and his band, Mississippi Heat, recorded a live DVD at Rosa's Lounge, Chicago (Delmark Records, 2005).

The full seven-piece band was filmed live on March 29, 2014, in Burghausen, Germany, at the international music festival B'Jazz Burghausen. The concert was shown on TV in the Munich area in late fall of that year.

Mississippi Heat has also been the subject of several TV shows and movies. In 1995, ARTE in Europe produced a documentary on blues that features Deitra Farr with the band. French-Canadian TV featured Pierre and Michel Lacocque on one of their regular programs, Baisers d'Amérique, in 1996. This half-hour segment was part of a series that aired simultaneously in 35 countries. Back to the Roots, a 1994 Belgian feature-length movie, was made about the original six-piece band with Lacocque, Farr, Flynn, Wheeler, Stroger and Kirk. It drew from interviews with each member of the band during their 1994 performance at the Ecaussinnes Spring Blues Festival in Belgium and focused on the Belgian roots of Pierre and Michel Lacocque.
