= List of Chicago blues musicians =

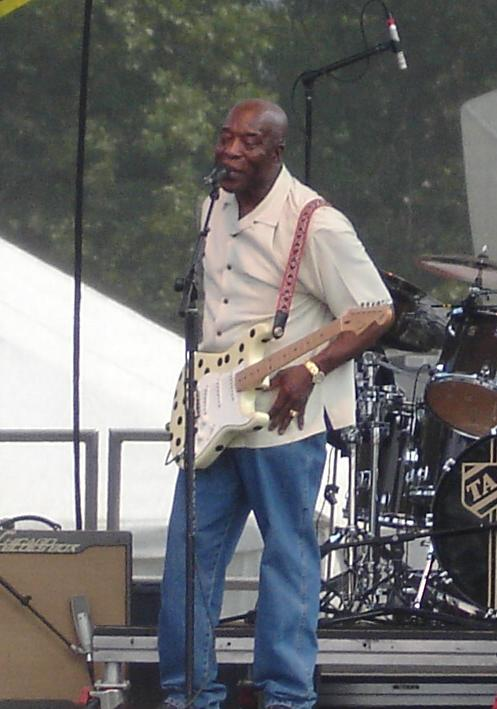
Guitarist Buddy Guy performing at the Bonnaroo Music Festival in 2006

Chicago blues is a form of blues music developed in Chicago, Illinois, in the 1950s, in which the basic instrumentation of Delta blues—acoustic guitar and harmonica—is augmented with electric guitar, amplified bass guitar, drums, piano, harmonica played with a microphone and an amplifier, and sometimes saxophone. The best-known Chicago blues musicians include singer-songwriters and bandleaders Muddy Waters, Howlin' Wolf, and Willie Dixon; guitar players such as Elmore James, Luther Allison, and Buddy Guy; and harp (blues slang for harmonica) players such as Little Walter, Paul Butterfield, and Charlie Musselwhite. Since the 1960s, the Chicago blues style and sound has spread around the US, the UK and beyond.

== A ==
- Alberta Adams (July 26, 1917 – December 25, 2014). In 1952, she signed a recording contract with Chess Records and recorded with Red Saunders for the label. She toured with Duke Ellington, Eddie Vinson, Louis Jordan, Lionel Hampton, and T-Bone Walker, among others.
- Linsey Alexander (born July 23, 1942, Holly Springs, Mississippi). Moved to Chicago in 1959, where he was active in the South Side music scene and became one of the hardest-working bluesmen in Chicago. He is known for his strong voice and guitar with his own style of electric blues. His album Been There Done That, recorded by Delmark Records in 2012, has been critically acclaimed as pure blues of the finest quality.
- Luther Allison (August 17, 1939, Widener, Arkansas – August 12, 1997). Moved to Chicago as a teenager and became a major force in the blues scene there, primarily as an electric guitarist and also as a singer. He released many albums for Alligator Records, based in Chicago.
- Kokomo Arnold (February 15, 1901, Lovejoy's Station, Georgia – November 8, 1968). Slide guitarist and vocalist who began his career in New York City and moved to Chicago in the latter half of the 1920s. He stopped recording for good in 1938, because he was not making a livable wage performing. His first recording was for Decca Records. Several compilation albums of his work have been released, such as those issued by Document Records.

== B ==
- Chico Banks (March 7, 1962, Chicago – December 4, 2008). Released one album in 1997 for Evidence Records and played with many other blues musicians.
- L.V. Banks (October 28, 1932, Stringtown, Mississippi – May 2, 2011). Moved to Chicago in 1965 and released two albums for Wolf Records.
- George Barnes (July 17, 1921, South Chicago Heights, Illinois – September 5, 1977). Electric guitar pioneer who recorded at the age of 16 with Big Bill Broonzy. He also recorded with Blind John Davis, Jazz Gillum and other notable Chicago blues artists, but was better known as a swing jazz guitarist and composer.
- Barrelhouse Chuck (born July 10, 1958, Columbus, Ohio – December 12, 2016)
- Lefty Bates (March 9, 1920, Leighton, Alabama – April 7, 2007). Guitarist who played on numerous recordings of Chicago blues, jazz and R&B.
- Carey Bell (November 14, 1936, Macon, Mississippi – May 6, 2007). Acoustic and electric harmonica blues and Chicago blues multi-instrumentalist, playing bass guitar, guitar, drums and harmonica and singing. He released several albums for Alligator Records, Delmark Records and other labels.
- Fred Below (September 16, 1926 – August 14, 1988). Drummer for the Aces and Little Walter and session player for Muddy Waters and many others.
- Buster Benton (July 19, 1932, Texarkana, Arkansas – January 20, 1996). Guitarist in Willie Dixon's Blues All-Stars, best known for his solo rendition of Dixon's song "Spider in My Stew."
- Elvin Bishop (born October 21, 1942, Glendale, California). An American blues and rock music singer, guitarist, bandleader, and songwriter. An original member of the Paul Butterfield Blues Band, he was inducted into the Rock and Roll Hall of Fame as a member of that group in 2015 and the Blues Hall of Fame in his own right in 2016.
- Scrapper Blackwell (February 21, 1903, Syracuse, North Carolina – October 27, 1962). Acoustic Piedmont blues artist and an early exponent of Chicago blues, who worked closely with pianist Leroy Carr. He also backed the singer Black Bottom McPhail. Document Records has issued most of his work in three volumes.
- Mike Bloomfield (July 28, 1943, Chicago – February 15, 1981). Guitarist.
- Boston Blackie – (November 6, 1943 – July 11, 1993). Stage name of Benjamin Joe "Bennie" Houston, born and raised in Alabama who established himself as a guitarist and singer on Chicago's West Side. He was shot dead by fellow musician Tail Dragger Jones.
- Eddie Boyd (November 25, 1914, Stovall, Mississippi – July 13, 1994). Blues pianist, singer, and songwriter, a fixture of the Chicago blues scene, performing electric and acoustic Chicago blues. He toured Europe with Buddy Guy in 1965. He left the United States and lived abroad because of racial discrimination. He recorded for Love Records, Decca Records, and other labels.,
- Billy Branch (born October 3, 1951, Great Lakes, Illinois). Blues harp player and vocalist who plays electric Chicago blues. He leads his own band, the Sons of Blues, and has released several albums for Evidence Records, Alligator Records and other labels.
- John Brim (April 10, 1922, Hopkinsville, Kentucky – October 1, 2003). Acoustic and electric Chicago blues guitarist, harmonica player and singer who regularly performed with his wife, Grace, on drums. He recorded for Fortune Records and Chess Records, among others.
- Lonnie Brooks (December 18, 1933 – April 1, 2017). Guitarist and singer.
- Ronnie Baker Brooks (born Rodney Dion Baker, January 23, 1967, Chicago). Blues singer and guitarist. His father, the blues guitarist Lonnie Brooks, was a strong musical influence on him, as were Buddy Guy, Junior Wells and other Chicago blues luminaries who jammed at the Brookses' home while he was growing up. His brother Wayne Baker Brooks is also a blues musician, and the three Brookses often appear as guests in each other's shows.
- Wayne Baker Brooks (born April 30, 1970, Chicago). Guitarist and singer, son of the blues guitarist Lonnie Brooks (as above).
- Big Bill Broonzy (June 26, 1903, Altheimer, Arkansas – August 14, 1958). Acoustic country blues musician who performed Chicago blues, singing and playing guitar and mandolin. He recorded over 350 compositions.
- J. T. Brown (April 2, 1918, Mississippi – November 24, 1969). Electric and acoustic Chicago blues tenor saxophonist and singer. He performed with Washboard Sam, Eddie Boyd, Elmore James and others.
- George "Mojo" Buford (November 10, 1929, Hernando, Mississippi – October 11, 2011). Played periodically in Muddy Waters's band.
- Aron Burton (June 15, 1938 – February 29, 2016). Played with Albert Collins, Freddie King and Champion Jack Dupree and released a number of solo albums, including Good Blues to You (Delmark, 1999).
- George "Wild Child" Butler (October 1, 1936, Hernando, Mississippi – March 1, 2005). Electric guitarist, blues harp player and vocalist. He recorded in the 1960s and 1970s for Mercury Records. In the 1980s he moved to Canada and continued recording and performing. His last album was released by APO Records in 2001.
- Paul Butterfield (December 17, 1942, Chicago – May 4, 1987). Amplified harmonica player, guitarist, vocalist and flautist who performed blues-rock and Chicago blues. He recorded for various labels, including Bearsville Records and Elektra Records.

== C ==
- Eddie C. Campbell (May 6, 1939 – November 20, 2018). Electric blues guitarist and singer. Performed with Howlin' Wolf, Luther Allison and many others. His debut album was for Mr. Blues Records. He has recorded for Blind Pig Records, JSP Records and other labels.
- Karen Carroll (January 30, 1958 – March 9, 2016). Blues vocalist, guitarist, and songwriter, the daughter of Mack Carroll and Alberta Simmons (stage name Jeanne Carroll). She first recorded with the Blues Masters (Carey Bell and his son Lurrie Bell) on the album Son of a Gun, released in 1984 by Rooster. She recorded two albums for Delmark Records and contributed to at least eight works on that label. She has written and recorded many singles and holds copyrights to them. Her final release was in 2011.
- Toronzo Cannon (born February 14, 1968, in Chicago, Illinois). Electric blues guitarist, vocalist and songwriter.
- Leonard Caston (June 2, 1917, Sumrall, Mississippi – August 22, 1987). Rhythm and blues pianist and a member of the Chicago blues band the Big Three Trio, with Willie Dixon and Ollie Crawford. He recorded for Okeh Records and Columbia Records with the group. After the trio broke up, he performed soul music and urban contemporary gospel as an organist.
- Chicago Blues All-Stars – An American blues band based in Chicago and formed in 2007.
- William Clarke (March 29, 1951, Inglewood, California – November 3, 1996). Blues harmonica player and singer. He recorded for various labels, including Alligator Records, Watch Dog Records and Rivera Records.
- Willie Clayton (born March 29, 1955, Indianola, Mississippi). Having started performing in the late 1960s, he has had 10 albums in the Billboard Top Blues Albums chart.
- Eddy "The Chief" Clearwater (January 10, 1935 – June 1, 2018). Moved to Chicago at the age of fifteen. He is a modern electric rhythm and blues and Chicago blues guitarist and singer. He has recorded numerous solo albums for Rounder Records, Delmark Records, and other labels.
- Climax Blues Band. Formed in 1968 and based in Stafford, England, performing blues-rock in the Chicago blues vein. In later years, the band has ventured into soft rock, roots rock and pop rock. The band has released many albums for Sire Records, Warner Bros. Records and others.
- Michael Coleman (June 24, 1956 – November 2, 2014). Played with James Cotton, Eddy Clearwater, Syl Johnson, and John Primer. Beginning in 1995, he released five albums, for Delmark Records and others
- James Cotton (born July 1, 1935, Tunica, Mississippi – March 16, 2017). Blues harmonica player and singer who got his start performing Delta blues, later moving to Chicago and performing Chicago blues. Performing in both acoustic and electric settings, he has recorded dozens of albums, for Alligator Records, Verve Records and other labels. He led the James Cotton Blues Band.
- Arthur "Big Boy" Crudup (August 24, 1905, Forest, Mississippi – March 28, 1974). Guitarist and singer who began his career performing Delta blues. He later moved to Chicago, where he continued performing Delta blues and also Chicago blues, in both acoustic and electric environments. Not until the blues revival of the 1960s did he receive widespread appreciation from audiences.

== D ==
- Lester Davenport (January 16, 1932, Tchula, Mississippi – March 17, 2009). Moved to Chicago in 1945. Electric Chicago blues harmonica player and vocalist, sometimes called Mad Dog Davenport. He recorded his first album in 1991 for Earwig Music. He recorded I Smell a Rat for Delmark Records in 2002.
- Blind John Davis (December 7, 1913, Hattiesburg, Mississippi – October 12, 1985). Accomplished blues, jazz, and boogie-woogie pianist who recorded with Sonny Boy Williamson, Tampa Red, Big Bill Broonzy, Merline Johnson and others.
- Jimmy Dawkins (October 24, 1936, Tchula, Mississippi – April 10, 2013). Moved to Chicago in 1955. Guitarist and vocalist and a fixture of the modern electric Chicago blues scene. His first album, Fast Fingers, was recorded in 1969 for Delmark Records, for which he recorded several others. He also recorded for the Earwig Music and other labels.
- Detroit Junior (October 26, 1931 – August 9, 2005). Born Emery Williams Jr in Haynes, Arkansas, he was a pianist, vocalist and songwriter. He is known for songs such as "So Unhappy", "Call My Job", "If I Hadn't Been High", "Ella" and "Money Tree". His songs have been recorded by Koko Taylor and Albert King among others.
- Bo Diddley (December 30, 1928, McComb, Mississippi – June 2, 2008). Guitarist and vocalist who performed electric Chicago blues, rock and roll and rhythm and blues. He had a long career, beginning in the 1950s. He recorded well over twenty albums for Checker Records, Chess Records, Atlantic Records and other labels.
- Willie Dixon (July 1, 1915, Vicksburg, Mississippi – January 29, 1992). Double bassist, singer, songwriter, record producer and guitarist, a key figure in the acoustic and electric Chicago blues scene. He was involved in helping start the careers of Bo Diddley and Muddy Waters, to name only two. He recorded for numerous labels. He also performed jump blues and would sometimes sing jive.
- Lefty Dizz (April 29, 1937, Osceola, Arkansas – September 7, 1993) Born Walter Williams in Osceola, Arkansas, and before his four-year tour of duty in the U.S. Air Force ended in 1956, Lefty began to play the guitar. When he returned to Chicago later that year, he came under the tutelage of Lacy Gibson and Earl Hooker. In 1958, Lefty joined Sonny Thompson's road band, playing rhythm 'n' blues throughout the country. During a gig in Seattle, a left-handed teenage guitarist named Jimi Hendrix, hung out with, and was influenced by, Lefty Dizz. In 1960, Lefty moved to Detroit, where he remained for four years, working with Junior Cannady and John Lee Hooker. From 1964 to 1971, Lefty worked with Junior Wells, during which time they toured the U.S., Canada, Africa, Europe, Southeast Asia, the Fiji Islands and Indonesia. Lefty then joined Hound Dog Taylor and the Houserockers, performing extensively until Hound Dog's passing in late 1975. He then formed his own band, Lefty Dizz and Shock Treatment. His most well-known compositions include "Bad Avenue", "I Found Out", If I Could Just Get My Hands on What I Got My Eyes On", Funny Acting Woman", "Somebody Stole My Christmas" and "Ain't It Nice to be Loved". Lefty Dizz died from esophageal cancer on September 7, 1993, at age 56, in Chicago.

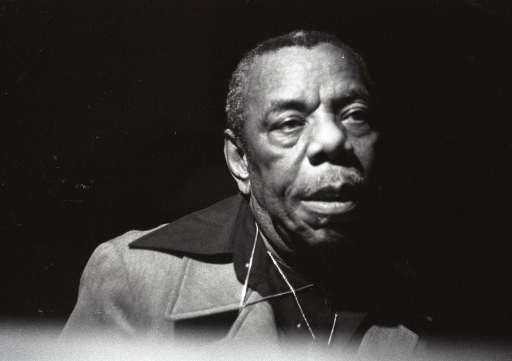
Champion Jack Dupree

- Johnny Drummer (born March 1, 1938). Singer, multi-instrumentalist, and songwriter.
- Little Arthur Duncan (February 5, 1934, Indianola, Mississippi – August 20, 2008). Moved to Chicago in 1950 and accompanied Earl Hooker in the 1950s. He released three solo albums.
- Champion Jack Dupree (born 1908, 1909, or 1910 [disputed], died January 21, 1992). Pianist.

== E ==
- Robert "Big Mojo" Elem (January 22, 1928 – February 5, 1997). Bass guitarist and singer.

== F ==
- Paul Filipowicz (born March 24, 1950). Singer, guitarist, harmonica player and songwriter. A 2015 inductee to the Chicago Blues Hall of Fame.
- Billy Flynn (born August 11, 1956). Electric guitarist, singer and songwriter.
- "Baby Face" Leroy Foster (February 1, 1923 – May 26, 1958). Singer, guitarist, and drummer.
- Little Willy Foster (April 5 or April 20, 1922 – November 25, 1987). Harmonica player, singer, and songwriter.
- Steve Freund (born July 20, 1952). Guitarist, singer, bandleader and record producer.

== G ==
- Lacy Gibson (May 1, 1936 – April 11, 2011). Guitarist, singer and songwriter.
- Jazz Gillum (September 11, 1904 – March 29, 1966). Harmonica player.
- Good Rockin' Charles (March 4, 1933, Tuscaloosa, Alabama – May 17, 1989). Born Henry Lee Bester, he released one album in his lifetime and is best known for his work with Johnny "Man" Young, Otis "Big Smokey" Smothers, Arthur "Big Boy" Spires and Jimmy Rogers.
- Jimmie Gordon (1906 – c. 1946) was a pianist, singer, and songwriter.
- Nick Gravenites (October 2, 1938 – September 18, 2024). Blues, rock and folk singer and songwriter.
- Buddy Guy (born July 30, 1936, Lettsworth, Louisiana). Acoustic and electric guitarist and an accomplished singer, one of the most recognizable artists of the Chicago blues. He has recorded numerous albums for Chess Records, Vanguard Records, Silvertone Records and other labels.
- Phil Guy (April 28, 1940 – August 20, 2008). Guitarist. He was the younger brother of Buddy Guy.
- Steve Guyger (born September 12, 1952). Harmonica player, singer, and songwriter. He has recorded five albums since 1997, having previously backed Jimmy Rogers for almost 15 years.

== H ==
- Harmonica Hinds (born January 4, 1945, Trinidad). Considered one of the most talented Chicago blues musicians, having played with many blues artists for more than five decades. He is still active on the Chicago blues scene.
- Shakey Jake Harris (April 12, 1921, Earle, Arkansas – March 2, 1990). Singer, harmonica player and songwriter, long associated with his nephew, Magic Sam.
- Homesick James (April 30, 1910 [uncertain] – December 13, 2006). Slide guitarist. Elmore James was his cousin.
- Earl Hooker (January 15, 1930, Clarksdale, Mississippi – April 21, 1970). Moved to Chicago with his family in the early 1940s. Slide guitarist who left an indelible mark on the Chicago blues. Having learning the rudiments of slide guitar from Robert Nighthawk, he joined Ike Turner's Kings of Rhythm in 1949 and toured the South. He returned to Chicago in the mid-1950s and became much in demand as a session player, recording with artists like Pinetop Perkins, Muddy Waters and his cousin, John Lee Hooker.
- Big Walter Horton (April 6, 1921, Horn Lake, Mississippi – December 8, 1981). Also known as Shakey Walter Horton, he was one of the better-known harmonica players of his day. He played the gamut, including Memphis blues, Chicago blues, juke joint blues and harmonica blues. He played both acoustic and amplified harmonica and was also a singer.
- Howlin' Wolf (June 10, 1910 – January 10, 1976). Singer, guitarist and harmonica player.
- J. B. Hutto (April 26, 1926 – June 12, 1983). Guitarist and singer.

== I ==
- Daniel Ivankovich (Chicago Slim) (born November 23, 1963). Founding member of the Chicago Blues All-Stars. He has performed and recorded with many Chicago blues musicians, including Otis Rush, Magic Slim and Junior Wells. He is also an orthopedic surgeon and a co-founder and medical director of OnePatient-Global Health Initiative, an organization that provides medical care to the poor in Chicago and abroad.

== J ==
- Lee Jackson (August 18, 1921 – July 1, 1979). Guitarist, bass guitarist, singer and songwriter. Although he did release a number of recordings in his own name, such as "Fishin' in My Pond" (1957), he is mostly known for his work on recordings with other blues musicians such as Johnny Shines, Willie Dixon, Jimmy Reed, J. B. Hutto, Sunnyland Slim, Lacy Gibson, and Little Walter.
- Elmore James (January 27, 1918, Richland, Mississippi – May 24, 1963). Slide guitarist, playing acoustic and electric guitars, and singer. He performed Delta blues and Chicago blues and is best known for the latter. His technique influenced a generation of guitarists who followed.
- Jimmy Johnson (November 25, 1928 – January 31, 2022). Guitarist and singer.
- Luther "Guitar Junior" Johnson (April 11, 1939 – December 25, 2022). Electric guitarist best known for his long stints with Muddy Waters in the 1970s. In 1980 he began doing solo work. His debut album was released by Evidence Records in 1976. He has also recorded for Telarc and Bullseye Blues.
- Luther "Georgia Boy" Johnson (born Lucius Brinson Johnson, August 30, 1934, Davisboro, Georgia – March 18, 1976). Electric guitarist, singer and songwriter, also known as Snake or Snake Boy and sometimes billed as Luther King or Little Luther (he recorded under the latter name for Chess Records in the 1960s).
- L.V. Johnson (December 25, 1946 – November 22, 1994). Guitarist, singer and songwriter.
- Syl Johnson (July 1, 1936 – February 6, 2022). Blues and soul singer and record producer.
- Floyd Jones (July 21, 1917 – December 19, 1989). Singer, guitarist and songwriter.
- Johnny "Yard Dog" Jones (June 21, 1941 – September 16, 2015). Chicago blues and soul blues singer, guitarist, harmonica player, and songwriter.
- Little Johnny Jones (November 1, 1924 – November 19, 1964). Pianist and singer.
- Moody Jones (April 8, 1908, Earle, Arkansas – March 23, 1988). Guitarist, bass player, and singer. Performed on Maxwell Street in the 1940s. A significant figure in the development of postwar Chicago blues, backing his cousin Floyd Jones, Snooky Pryor and others on singles released in the late 1940s and early 1950s.
- Tail Dragger Jones – (September 30, 1940 – September 4, 2023). American Chicago blues singer who performed since the 1960s and released four albums. Jones gained a certain notoriety in 1993, after being convicted of second-degree murder for the killing of fellow blues musician, Boston Blackie.

== K ==
- E.G. Kight (born January 17, 1966). Singer, guitarist and songwriter.
- Bobby King (January 29, 1941 – July 22, 1983). Guitarist, singer-songwriter. King worked with Hank Ballard and The Midnighters, Bobby Bland, Lee "Shot" Williams, Eddy Clearwater, Freddie King, Lonnie Johnson, The Aces and Sonny Thompson. Although he may be better remembered as a session musician, between 1962 and 1975, King recorded four singles and one album.
- Eddie King (April 21, 1938 – March 14, 2012). Guitarist, singer-songwriter.
- Big Daddy Kinsey (March 18, 1927 – April 3, 2001). Singer, guitarist and harmonica player.
- Donald Kinsey (May 12, 1953 – February 6, 2024). Guitarist and singer.

== L ==
- Pierre Lacocque (born October 13, 1952). Harmonica player, songwriter, and Mississippi Heat band leader.
- Sammy Lawhorn (July 12, 1935 – April 29, 1990). Guitarist.
- Johnny Laws (January 12, 1943 – March 28, 2021). Guitarist, singer and songwriter.
- Sam Lay (March 20, 1935 – January 29, 2022). Drummer and singer.
- Bonnie Lee (June 11, 1931 – September 7, 2006). Singer.
- J. B. Lenoir (March 5, 1929 – April 29, 1967). Guitarist, singer and songwriter.
- Hip Linkchain (November 10, 1936 – February 13, 1989). Guitarist, singer and songwriter.
- John Littlejohn (April 16, 1931 – February 1, 1994). Electric blues slide guitarist.
- Little Walter (May 1, 1930 – February 15, 1968). Harmonica player and singer.
- Robert Lockwood, Jr. (March 27, 1915 – November 21, 2006). Guitarist.
- Professor Eddie Lusk (September 21, 1948 – August 26, 1992). Session and touring musician.
- Willie James Lyons (December 5, 1938 – December 26, 1980). Guitarist, singer and songwriter. He worked primarily in the West Side of Chicago from the late 1950s up to his death. Lyons was an accompanist to many musicians who included Luther Allison, Jimmy Dawkins and Bobby Rush. A noted performer in his own right, Lyons work was influenced by B.B. King and Freddie King, T-Bone Walker and Lowell Fulson. His only solo album was Chicago Woman, recorded in France in 1979.

== M ==
- Willie Mabon (October 24, 1925 – April 19, 1985). Pianist, singer-songwriter.
- Magic Sam (February 14, 1937 – December 1, 1969). Guitarist and singer.
- Liz Mandeville. Singer-songwriter, guitarist, rubboard player, music producer, owner of the record label Blue Kitty Music.
- Earring George Mayweather (September 27, 1928 – February 12, 1995). Born in Montgomery, Alabama, United States. Although he only recorded a single solo album, Mayweather's harmonica work appeared on recordings by J. B. Hutto and Eddie Taylor.
- Holle Thee Maxwell (born October 17, 1945, Chicago). Singer-songwriter with a six-decade career. She is known for her command of a wide range of genres. She replaced Tina Turner as vocalist with Ike Turner's band. Bobby Bland used one of the songs she wrote for his critically acclaimed album Come Fly with Me.
- L. C. McKinley (October 22, 1918 – January 19, 1970). Guitarist.
- Andrew "Blueblood" McMahon (April 12, 1926 – February 17, 1984). Bass guitarist, singer-songwriter. McMahon played bass guitar in Howlin' Wolf's backing ensemble for over a decade. He also backed a number of other Chicago-based blues musicians on record.
- Big Maceo Merriweather (March 31, 1905 – February 23, 1953). Pianist and singer.
- Little Brother Montgomery (April 18, 1906 – September 6, 1985). Pianist and singer.
- Johnny B. Moore (born January 24, 1950). Guitarist, singer-songwriter.
- Nick Moss (born December 15, 1969). Guitarist, bassist, harmonica player and singer.
- Matt "Guitar" Murphy (December 29, 1929 – June 15, 2018). Guitarist and singer-songwriter. He was associated with the bands The Blues Brothers and Howlin' Wolf.
- Charlie Musselwhite (born January 31, 1944). Electric blues harmonica player and bandleader.

== N ==
- Robert Nighthawk (November 30, 1909 – November 5, 1967). Guitarist, harmonica player and singer.

== O ==
- Andrew Odom (December 15, 1936 – December 23, 1991). Chicago blues and electric blues singer and songwriter.

== P ==
- Odie Payne (August 27, 1926 – March 1, 1989). Drummer.
- Dion Payton (October 21, 1950 – March 12, 2021). Guitarist and singer.
- Morris Pejoe (April 11, 1924 – July 27, 1982). Singer, guitarist, and songwriter.
- Pinetop Perkins (July 7, 1913 – March 21, 2011). Pianist.
- Brewer Phillips (November 16, 1924, Coila, Mississippi – August 30, 1999). Chicago blues and juke joint blues acoustic and electric guitarist and singer active from the 1970s to the 1990s. He recorded for Delmark Records and JSP Records.
- Snooky Pryor (September 15, 1921 – October 18, 2006). Harmonica player.

== R ==
- A.C. Reed (May 9, 1926 – February 24, 2004). Saxophonist.
- Jimmy Reed (September 6, 1925 – August 29, 1976). Guitarist, harmonica player and singer.
- Rhythm Willie (c. September 15, 1910 – 1954) Harmonica player.
- Jimmy Rogers (June 3, 1924, Ruleville, Mississippi – December 19, 1997). Guitarist, harmonica player and singer.
- Freddie Roulette (May 3, 1939 – December 24, 2022). Electric blues lap steel guitarist and singer.
- Otis Rush (April 29, 1934 – September 29, 2018). Guitarist and singer.

== S ==
- Marty Sammon (October 14, 1977 – October 15, 2022). Keyboardist.
- Ken Saydak (born August 18, 1951). Pianist and singer-songwriter.
- Son Seals (August 13, 1942 – December 20, 2004). Electric blues guitarist and singer.
- Eddie Shaw (March 20, 1937 – January 29, 2018). Tenor saxophonist.
- Corky Siegel (born October 24, 1943). Singer-songwriter and composer, he plays harmonica and piano. He plays and writes blues and blues-rock music, and has also worked extensively on combining blues and classical music. He is best known as the co-leader of the Siegel-Schwall Band.
- Little Mack Simmons (January 25, 1933 – October 24, 2000). Harmonica player, singer-songwriter.
- Matthew Skoller (born August 3, 1962, in Canton, New York). Harmonicist, singer, songwriter, and record producer. He has released five albums, as well as recording his harmonica playing on other musicians work.
- Barkin' Bill Smith. (August 18, 1928 – April 24, 2000). Singer-songwriter, performed solo and sang for electric blues bands, such as Dave Specter & the Bluebirds.
- Byther Smith (April 17, 1932 – September 10, 2021). Blues guitarist and singer.

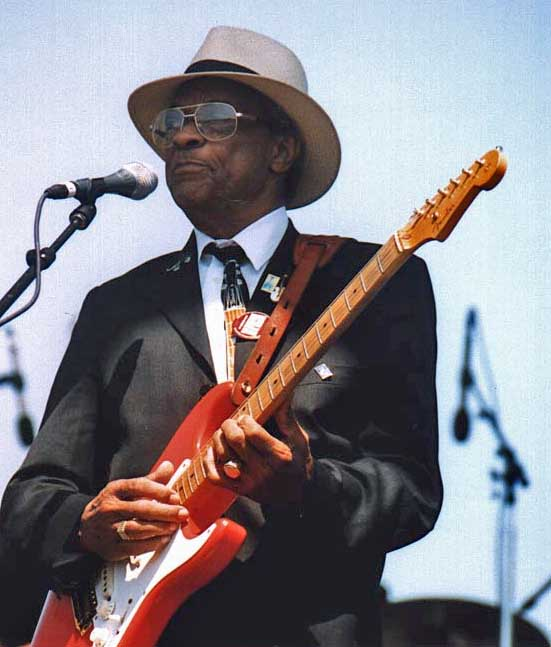
Hubert Sumlin

- Little Smokey Smothers (January 2, 1939 – November 20, 2010). Guitarist and singer.
- Otis "Big Smokey" Smothers (March 21, 1929 – July 23, 1993). Guitarist and singer.
- Otis Spann (March 21, 1930 – April 24, 1970). Pianist and singer.
- Dave Specter (born May 21, 1963). Guitarist.
- Arthur "Big Boy" Spires (February 25, 1912 – October 22, 1990). Guitarist and singer.
- Arbee Stidham (February 9, 1917 – April 26, 1988). Singer and multi-instrumentalist.
- Bob Stroger (born December 27, 1930). Bass guitarist, singer-songwriter active since the 1960s. He backed Eddie King, Otis Rush and Sunnyland Slim.
- Studebaker John (born November 5, 1952). Guitarist and harmonica player.
- Sugar Blue (born December 16, 1949). Harmonica player.
- Hubert Sumlin (November 16, 1931 – December 4, 2011). Guitarist and singer.
- Sunnyland Slim (September 5, 1906 – March 17, 1995). Pianist and singer.

== T ==
- Tampa Red (January 8, 1903 – March 19, 1981). Guitarist and songwriter.
- Demetria Taylor (born February 28, 1973). Singer and songwriter, the daughter of the underneath named musician.
- Eddie Taylor (January 29, 1923 – December 25, 1985). Electric blues guitarist and singer.
- Eddie Taylor Jr. (March 27, 1972 – March 8, 2019). Chicago blues and electric blues guitarist, singer and songwriter. Son of the above.
- Hound Dog Taylor (April 12, 1915 – December 17, 1975). Guitarist and singer.
- Koko Taylor (September 28, 1928 – June 3, 2009). Singer.
- Melvin Taylor (born March 13, 1959). Guitarist.
- Johnny Temple (October 18, 1906 – November 22, 1968). Guitarist and singer.

== W ==
- Johnny "Big Moose" Walker (June 27, 1927 – November 27, 1999). Chicago blues and electric blues pianist and organist.
- Washboard Sam (July 15, 1910 – November 6, 1966). Washboard player and singer.
- Muddy Waters (born McKinley Morganfield, April 4, 1913, Rolling Fork, Mississippi – April 30, 1983). Slide guitarist and singer who began his career playing Delta blues but is best known as a Chicago blues musician.
- Valerie Wellington (November 14, 1959, Chicago – January 2, 1993). Classical opera singer who successfully turned to recording Chicago blues.
- Junior Wells (December 9, 1934 – January 15, 1998). Harmonica player and singer.
- Golden "Big" Wheeler (December 15, 1929 – July 20, 1998). Chicago blues and electric blues singer, harmonica player, and songwriter.
- James Wheeler (August 28, 1937 – December 25, 2014). Chicago blues guitarist, singer and songwriter. He was the younger brother of the above named.
- Big Joe Williams (October 16, 1903 – December 17, 1982). Better known as a Delta blues player and itinerant musician, but an important figure in the development of Chicago blues by virtue of his recordings with Sonny Boy Williamson I.
- Johnny Williams (May 15, 1906 – March 6, 2006). Guitarist and singer.
- Lil' Ed Williams (born April 8, 1955). Slide guitarist, singer-songwriter.
- Sonny Boy Williamson I (John Lee Williamson, March 30, 1914 – June 1, 1948). Harmonica player, singer-songwriter.
- Sonny Boy Williamson II (Alex or Aleck "Rice" Miller, possibly December 5, 1912 – May 24, 1965). Harmonica player, singer-songwriter.
- Big John Wrencher (February 12, 1923 – July 15, 1977). Harmonica player and singer.

== Y ==
- Johnny "Man" Young (January 1, 1918 – April 18, 1974). Singer, mandolin player and guitarist. His nickname, Man, came from his playing the mandolin.
- Mighty Joe Young (September 23, 1927 – March 24, 1999). Guitarist. He began his music career in the early 1950s, singing on the Milwaukee nightclub circuit and taking his stage name after the film of the same name. In 1955, he returned to Louisiana to make his recording debut, for Jiffy Records.
- Zora Young (born January 21, 1948, West Point, Mississippi). Soul blues and gospel blues singer. She has toured Europe several times and has released albums for Delmark Records, Deluge Records, Black Lightning Records and other labels.

== See also ==
- List of blues musicians
- List of musicians from Chicago
