= The Cash Box Kings =

American blues band

- Origin: Chicago, Illinois and Madison, Wisconsin United States
- Genres: Blues; Rock
- Label: Alligator Records
- Members: Joe Nosek; Oscar Wilson; Billy Flynn; Kenny “Beedy Eyes” Smith; John W. Lauler
- Website: www.cashboxkings.com

The Cash Box Kings is an American blues band from Chicago, Illinois, United States, specializing in Chicago-style blues from the 1940s and 1950s, as well as Delta blues style music from the 1920s and 1930s.

== Overview ==
The Cash Box Kings were created by singer, songwriter, and harmonica player Joe Nosek, who now heads the band, along with singer/songwriter Oscar Wilson. The band was signed with Alligator Records, and more latterly Blind Pig Records. The band is named with respect to Cashbox, a defunct publication that kept a music chart from the 1940s through the mid-1990s that rivaled Billboard 's. I-94 Blues, the band's fourth release, was recorded entirely in a single day, with a majority of the finished tracks recorded live in the studio. Holler and Stomp, the CBK's Blind Pig label debut, was nominated for Blues Blast Music Awards for “Band of the Year,” “Song of the Year” and “Best Traditional Blues” CD. The band released Black Toppin' in 2013 to favorable reviews, and the album won the Blues Blast Music Award for Traditional Blues Album of the Year. Their album, Holding Court, released in 2015, has received favorable reviews from critics and fans for its songs' contemporary themes. For example, "Download Blues" recounted the struggles of musicians in today's internet and digital music piracy age, while "Gotta Move Out to the Suburbs" bemoaned the difficulties that come with urban gentrification juxtaposed with traditional, old-school blues style. It is their third release with Blind Pig, a label that band header Joe Nosek says they feel "at home" with. Gaining traction with this album, the CBKs were featured performers in the 2015 Chicago Blues Festival.

The Cash Box Kings received three nominations for the 37th Blues Music Awards, held in May 2016.

Their 2019 recording, Hail to the Kings!, was chosen as a 'Favorite Blues Album' by AllMusic.

== Members ==
=== Joe Nosek ===
Joe Nosek moved to Chicago in his early teens, and, inspired by the music of Muddy Waters and Howlin' Wolf (Chester Arthur Burnett), fell in love with the blues. He remembers attending the Chicago Blues Festival every year and seeing his favorite musicians perform at blues bars. He learned to play the harmonica and guitar, and by his early twenties, Nosek had performed with Clyde Stubblefield, Luther Allison, and Casey Jones. Nosek formed the Cash Box Kings in his mid-twenties, for whom he provides vocals, arrangements, and harmonica. Nosek wrote or co-wrote eight of the thirteen tunes appearing on the band's 2015 album, Holding Court.

=== Oscar Wilson ===
Oscar "43 Street" Wilson, the second front-man of the band, was born in Chicago into a musical family: his father was a jazz, blues, and gospel musician and composer. He taught himself guitar, piano, drums and harmonica, and remembers performing at the age of 11 at a neighbor's house party. Instead of having formal training as a new musician, Wilson is mostly self-taught, resulting in his own personal style and technique.

=== Kenny Smith ===
Drummer Kenny "Beedy Eyes" Smith got an early start with the blues, performing with Muddy Waters at the age of seven. From there he went on to perform all over the world and record tracks with Pinetop Perkins, Homesick James, Billy Boy Arnold, Henry Townsend, Junior Wells and Jimmy Rogers.

=== Joel Paterson ===
Playing guitar and singing vocals for the Cash Box Kings, Paterson has toured and recorded with Wanda Jackson and David "Honeyboy" Edwards, among others. He is currently a member of not only the Cash Box Kings, but other Chicago bands such as the Modern Sounds and the Western Elstons. He also played with Kim Wilson's Blues All-Stars.

Paterson was hired to play in Bob Dylan's touring band in 2026, his first show being June 29 in Austin.

=== Other members ===
The CBKs are also augmented by a rotating cast of honorary Kings including Gerry Hundt (bass, rhythm guitar, vocals), Billy Flynn (guitar, mandolin, vocals, harmonica), Brad Ber (upright bass), Beau Sample (upright bass, vocals), and Mark Haines (drums). Barrelhouse Chuck (piano, vocals) also regularly performed with the group, prior to his death in 2016. Travis Koopman (guitar, vocals, songwriter) was a founding member of the Cash Box Kings. He contributed to the early Cash Box Kings albums and was in the traveling road band between the years of 2001-2008.

== Discography ==
- Live! At the King Club (2003)
- Black Night Fallin' (2005)
- The Royal Treatment (2006)
- I-94 Blues (2010)
- Holler and Stomp (2011)
- Black Toppin' (2013)
- Holding Court (2015)
- Royal Mint (2017)
- Hail to the Kings! (2019)
- Oscar's Motel (2023)
