= James Wheeler (musician) =

- Born: James Wheeler; August 28, 1937; Albany, Georgia, U.S.
- Died: December 25, 2014 (aged 77) Chicago, Illinois, U.S.
- Genres: Chicago blues
- Occupations: Guitarist, singer, songwriter
- Instruments: Vocals, guitar
- Years active: 1960s–2014
- Label: Delmark

James Wheeler (August 28, 1937 – December 25, 2014) was a Chicago blues guitarist, singer and songwriter. He was the younger brother of fellow blues musician Golden "Big" Wheeler. Compared to his brother, he was something of a latecomer to the blues, as he did not start playing until his late teens, but had a career lasting over half a century. Wheeler was hosting a regular jam night at Rosa's Lounge in Chicago up until his death.

== Biography ==
He was born in Albany, Georgia, United States. Unlike many of that era, it was not the blues but big band music that first entranced Wheeler. His influences were Glenn Miller, Duke Ellington, and his real passion, Louis Jordan. By the age of 19, Wheeler had not yet picked up a musical instrument, but was tempted to follow his older brother, Golden "Big" Wheeler to relocate to Chicago, Illinois. After the move in 1956, and seeing his brother rubbing shoulders with blues musicians such as Little Walter, Wheeler acquired a guitar and started to practice and jam with other guitarists. His eventual choice of instrument was somewhat unorthodox, when purchasing an old Harmony acoustic guitar with electric pick-up. In time Wheeler grew more proficient through regular West Side jam sessions, and he secured regular employment backing Billy Boy Arnold at the Club Arden. In 1963, Wheeler formed his own band, the Jaguars, and they found work backing a succession of musicians including B.B. King, Otis Rush, Otis Clay, Millie Jackson, and others.

The Jaguars disbanded in 1972, and one of their former employers, Otis Clay, asked Wheeler to join his backing group the OCBs, a stay that lasted three years. Wheeler then played with the Impressions on a short tour, before a lack of opportunities saw Wheeler take up a day job, playing on evenings and weekends as time allowed. He was out of the music business for a decade, before in 1986, Otis Rush gave him a weekend engagement which turned in to regular work lasting until 1993. In 1991, Wheeler joined Mississippi Heat with whom he recorded three albums, Straight from the Heart (1992), Learned the Hard Way (1994) and Thunder in My Heart (1995). Wheeler then joined up with Magic Slim. Wheeler later had a stint backing Willie Kent.

His first solo album, Ready!, was released in 1998 on Delmark Records. The collection had ten original numbers written by Wheeler, plus three reworkings of older material including a version of Sonny Boy Williamson II's "Good Morning Little Schoolgirl". Apart from Wheeler himself on guitar and vocals, his band featured Billy Flynn, rhythm guitar; Ken Saydak, piano; Bob Stroger, bass; Vernon Rodgers, drums; Golden "Big" Wheeler, harmonica; and Gloria Thompson-Rodgers, vocals. The album was produced by Delmark's owner, Bob Koester. Then followed a hectic tour, which encompassed dates in Europe and South America. His sophomore release, Can't Take It, was issued in 2000, again on Delmark. This time Wheeler wrote all of the numbers and the personnel remained similar, although Ron Sorin replaced Golden "Big" Wheeler on harmonica. Wheeler stated about his song writing ethos, "I've been writing since '75... Most of the songs I write have a comedy feel to it. I make a little story line then you can look at it and see the picture. I go from the beginning, to the middle, to the end. I set it up so you can tell the rest of the story. On a lot of them I be crackin' up myself, but there's a little bit of truth in all of it."

He died on Christmas Day 2014, in Chicago, Illinois, at the age of 77.

== Discography ==
=== Albums ===
Year	Title	Record label
1998	Ready!	Delmark Records
2000	Can't Take It	Delmark Records

== See also ==
- List of Chicago blues musicians
