= Mississippi Heat =

Mississippi Heat is an American blues band based in Chicago, led by harmonica player Pierre Lacocque. Formed in 1991, the band has toured in the United States, Canada, and Europe, with occasional performances in South America and North Africa.

Mississippi Heat has recorded 12 albums: four on Van der Linden Records, the band's own label (1992–1998), three on the European label CrossCut Records (1998–2005) and six with Chicago label Delmark Records since 2005. The band also released a live DVD in 2005.

== Birth of Mississippi Heat ==
Mississippi Heat grew out of a 1991 gig at Cafe Lura, in Chicago, when guitarist and singer Jon McDonald invited Lacocque to join him onstage. McDonald had hired drummer and vocalist Robert "Golden Voice" Covington (Robert Lee Travis, who was then working with Sunnyland Slim) and bassist Bob Stroger (also with Sunnyland Slim and with Jimmy Rogers). That night went so well the quartet decided to form Mississippi Heat. Lacocque's brother Michel, who was also in attendance, volunteered to become their manager.

McDonald left the band soon after and was later replaced by Billy Flynn and James Wheeler. Covington became lead vocalist and was replaced on drums by Bob Carter and later by Allen Kirk.

== Recording history ==
In 1992, the band released its first album, Straight from the Heart, with Covington on drums and vocals, Stroger on bass, Flynn and Wheeler on guitars, and Lacocque on the harmonica. The album includes the song "Heartbroken," a track recorded without rehearsals and in only one take. The song was written by Lacocque for his late mentor and friend Sonny Wimberly, a blues bassist who had recorded with Little Walter, Muddy Waters and Bo Diddley. Wimberly died in 1991, months before he and Lacocque had planned to record together.

Straight from the Heart is Mississippi Heat's only album with Covington on vocals. He became increasingly busy working with Sunnyland Slim and had steady work under his own name at the Chicago club Kingston Mines. (Wheeler occasionally performed with him there and also with the Frank Pellegrino Blues Band.)

In 1993, Covington was replaced by Deitra Farr on lead vocals and Allen Kirk on drums. Farr performed on the albums Learned the Hard Way (1994) and Thunder in My Heart. (Farr returned as a guest vocalist on three songs on the album Delta Bound, released in 2012).

Katherine Davis, Zora Young and Mary Lane performed briefly with Mississippi Heat.

Inetta Visor took over as the band's vocalist in 2001 and has been with the band for 15 years (2001–present). She is featured on eight of the 12 recordings.

Flynn and Wheeler performed on Mississippi Heat's first three albums. Since then the band's recordings have featured guitarists Chris Winters, Steve Doyle, Billy Satterfield and Michael Dotson (2012–present).

Over the years Mississippi Heat has recorded and traveled with two permanent guest artists: Carl Weathersby (1997–present) and Lurrie Bell (2005–present).

Mississippi Heat has also recorded with guest stars Sam Lay and Calvin Jones (on Straight from the Heart, 1992), Billy Boy Arnold (on Handyman, 1998/1999, and Footprints on the Ceiling, 2002), John Primer (on Let’s Live It Up, 2010), Chubby Carrier (on Delta Bound, 2012), and Sax Gordon (on Warning Shot, 2014, and "Cab Driving Man", 2016). Keyboard player Chris "Hambone" Cameron and percussionist Ruben Alvarez also perform on several of the band's albums.

The vintage blues-heavy 16-track record Warning Shot, released in 2014, features vocalist Visor, Lacocque on harmonica, Dotson on guitar and vocals, Brian Quinn on bass, Kenny Smith and Andrew “Blaze” Thomas on drums and vocals, Giles Corey on guitar and Neal O'Hara on keyboards. It also includes guest artists Gordon on tenor and baritone saxophones, Alvarez on Latin percussion (his third album with Mississippi Heat), Weathersby on guitar (his seventh album with the band) and background vocalists Mae Koen, Diane Madison and Nanette Frank, who have worked with Aretha Franklin.

== Musical style ==
The band's motto is "Traditional Blues with a Unique Sound."

Mississippi Heat describes its musical style as having roots in the golden era of Chicago blues in the 1950s. Lacocque cites Muddy Waters, Jimmy Rogers, Howlin' Wolf, Jimmy Reed, Big Walter Horton, Little Walter, Sonny Boy Williamson I, Sonny Boy Williamson II and Junior Wells as influences.

Lacocque said in a 2014 interview that although some white harmonica players, such as Paul Butterfield and Charlie Musselwhite have influenced him, "it is the musical history and heritage of African-Americans that have really had an impact on my playing." Lacocque has stressed that he is also drawn to new ideas. "We are very attracted to the traditional Chicago blues and the Chicago blues sound, for sure. But we want to bring something fresh and exciting to the culture as well," he told Blues Blast Magazine in 2013.

In a 2014 interview with the blog Friday Blues Fix, Lacocque said that some of his favorite recordings are Chess Records' collections of music by artists Willie Dixon, Chuck Berry, Muddy Waters and Howlin' Wolf. He told WBEZ in 2011 that he listens to much Latin music, because his wife is from Cuba.

== Lineups ==
Current

- Pierre Lacocque, harmonica, bandleader
- Sheryl Youngblood, lead vocals
- Inetta Visor, lead vocals
- Daneshia Hamilton
- Zach Avery, guitar, vocals
- Terrence Williams, drums

Former

- Spurling Banks, bass (2003–2007)
- Lurrie Bell (guest on two CDs and DVD)
- Chris "Hambone" Cameron, keyboard (guest on several CDs)
- Barrelhouse Chuck, piano (1997–1999)
- Giles Corey, guitar, vocals (2007-2026)
- Robert Covington, vocals, drums (1991–1993)
- Katherine Davis, vocals (1997–1999)
- Michael Dotson, guitar, vocals
- Deitra Farr, vocals (1993–1996)
- Billy Flynn, guitar (1991–1997)
- Steve "The Kid" Howard, bass (1998–2003, 2007–2011)
- Calvin "Fuzz" Jones, bass (1993)
- Allen Kirk, drums (1993–1996)
- Mary Lane, vocals (1997)
- Jon McDonald, guitar (1991)
- Neal O'Hara, keyboard
- John Primer, guitar and vocals ("Let's Live it Up"' 2010)
- Brian Quinn, bass
- Kenny Smith, drums, vocals
- Bob Stroger, bass (1991–1997)
- Max Valldeneu (2005–2006)
- Joseph Veloz, bass (2011–2012)
- Carl Weathersby (guest on several CDs)
- James Wheeler, guitar (1991–1996)
- Zora Young, vocals (1997)

== Discography ==
- Straight from the Heart (Van der Linden Records, 1992)
- Learned the Hard Way (Van der Linden Records, 1994)
- Thunder in My Heart (Van der Linden Records, 1995)
- Handyman (Van der Linden Records, 1998; licensed in 1999 by CrossCut Records, with 2 bonus tracks)
- Footprints on the Ceiling (Crosscut Records, 2002)
- Glad You're Mine (Crosscut Records, 2005)
- One Eye Open: Live at Rosa's Lounge, Chicago (Delmark Records, 2005; also on DVD with bonus tracks)
- Hattiesburg Blues (Delmark Records, 2008)
- Let's Live It Up (Delmark Records, 2010)
- Delta Bound (Delmark Records, 2012)
- Warning Shot (Delmark Records, 2014)
- Cab Driving Man (Delmark Records, 2016)
- Madeleine (Van der Linden Records, 2021)
- Don't Look Back (Delmark Records, 2025)

== Movies, videos and television ==
Mississippi Heat recorded a live DVD at Rosa's Lounge, Chicago (Delmark Records, 2005).

The full seven-piece band was filmed live on March 29, 2014, in Burghausen, Germany, at the international music festival B’Jazz Burghausen. The concert was shown on TV in the Munich area in late fall of that year.

Mississippi Heat has also been the subject of several TV shows and movies. In 1995, ARTE in Europe produced a documentary on blues that features Deitra Farr with the band. French-Canadian TV featured Pierre and Michel Lacocque on one of their regular programs, Baisers d'Amérique, in 1996. This half-hour segment was part of a series that aired simultaneously in 35 countries. Back to the Roots, a 1994 Belgian feature-length movie, was made about the original six-piece band with Lacocque, Farr, Flynn, Wheeler, Stroger and Kirk. It drew from interviews with each member of the band during their 1994 performance at the Ecaussinnes Spring Blues Festival in Belgium and focused on the Belgian roots of Pierre and Michel Lacocque.

== Events ==
- Chicago Blues Festival (US). Mississippi Heat has often appeared at this festival, most recently in 2013 and 2018.
- Lucerne Blues Festival (SWITZERLAND), 2014, 2000, 1996, 1995. Pierre also performed there as a guest with Dave Weld and the Imperial Flames band in November 2023. A live recording was made in 1996 but has not been released.
- Montreal International Jazz Festival (CANADA). The band has been a headliner at this festival on numerous occasions. It played there for the first time in 1994, in front of an audience of 27,000. Its last appearance at the festival was in 2022.
- Ecaussinnes Spring Blues Festival (BELGIUM). Mississippi Heat has performed at the festival many times, beginning in 1994. Its first appearance there drew Belgian TV and a private movie crew to capture the band on film.
- Caracas International Music Festival (VENEZUELA)
- Nötodden Blues Fest (NORWAY)

Mississippi Heat has also performed in Austria, Croatia, England, Finland, France, Germany, Greece, Hungary, Luxembourg, Mexico, Netherlands, Poland, Serbia, Slovenia, Spain, Tunisia, and Turkey among other countries.
