= Little Smokey Smothers =

American blues guitarist and singer

- Born: Albert Abraham Smothers; January 2, 1939; Tchula, Mississippi, US
- Died: November 20, 2010 (aged 71) Chicago, Illinois, US
- Genres: Chicago blues
- Occupations: Guitarist, singer
- Instruments: Guitar, vocals
- Years active: Late 1950s–2010
- Label: Various

Little Smokey Smothers (January 2, 1939 – November 20, 2010) was a Chicago blues guitarist and singer. He played with the Paul Butterfield Blues Band and played with other Chicago blues musicians in the 1960s, then left music for most of the 1970s. He returned to music in the late 1970s and continued performing until his death in 2010.

His elder brother was the bluesman Otis "Big Smokey" Smothers (died 1993), with whom he was sometimes confused.

== Biography ==
Albert Abraham "Abe" Smothers was born in Tchula, Mississippi, learned to play the guitar at the age of 15, and relocated to Chicago two years later. He soon appeared on stage, playing with Arthur “Big Boy” Spires, Magic Sam, Otis Rush and Lazy Bill Lucas. In 1958 he joined up with Howlin' Wolf, and he accompanied Wolf in a recording session for Chess Records the following year. Tracks Smothers contributed to include "I've Been Abused", "Howlin' for My Darling". and "Mr. Airplane Man".

In 1961 he founded Little Smokey Smothers and the Pipeplayers. He later met Paul Butterfield and became a founding member of the Paul Butterfield Blues Band. He was replaced in the band by Elvin Bishop but developed a friendship that lasted a lifetime. Throughout the 1960s Smothers appeared with Buddy Guy, James Cotton, Earl Hooker, and Junior Wells. Musical opportunities dried up in the 1970s, and Smothers worked in construction. After a break of several years, he recorded again in 1979, on Mojo Buford's album Chicago Blues Summit. In the 1980s he was with the Legendary Blues Band and contributed to their 1989 album Woke Up with the Blues.

In 1993, Bishop was a guest artist on Smothers's first solo album, Bossman! The Chicago Blues of Little Smokey Smothers, released by the Dutch label Black Magic. Smothers's cousin Lee "Shot" Williams also played on the album. Bishop and Smothers performed at the 1993 Chicago Blues Festival.

Smothers had open-heart surgery in 1995. The following year he issued Second Time Around. He performed at the 1999 San Diego Blues Festival and at a party for Mick Jagger's 55th birthday.

Alligator Records issued That's My Partner in 2000, a live album recorded in San Francisco, in which Smothers reunited with Bishop. Smothers also performed at the 2000 Chicago Blues Festival. He appeared in Martin Scorsese's 2003 television series The Blues, which contained excerpts from his live show. In 2006 Smothers and Bishop played at the Ground Zero club in Clarksdale, Mississippi.

Smothers had health problems in his later years. His legs were amputated as a result of diabetes.

In 2009, Bishop compiled the benefit album Chicago Blues Buddies, incorporating recordings he made with Smothers dating back to 1992. Proceeds from the album helped to pay for Smothers's medical expenses.

On November 20, 2010, after a stay in a Chicago hospital, Smothers died of natural causes. In 2014 the Killer Blues Headstone Project placed a headstone for him at the Homewood Memorial Cemetery in Homewood, Illinois.

== Discography ==
=== Albums ===
- Bossman! The Chicago Blues of Little Smokey Smothers (1993), Black Magic (Dutch label)
- Second Time Around (1996), Crosscut (German label)
- Chicago Blues Buddies (2009), Black Derby

=== Other appearances ===
- Woke up with the Blues, The Legendary Blues Band (1989), Ichiban
- Cold Shot, Lee "Shot" Williams (1995), Black Magic
- That's My Partner, Elvin Bishop (2000), Alligator
- Chicago Blues Summit, George "Mojo" Buford (2002), P-Vine

== See also ==
- List of Chicago blues musicians
