= Calvin "Fuzz" Jones =

American bassist and singer

- Jones in the 1980 film The Blues Brothers

Background information
- Born: June 9, 1926; Greenwood, Mississippi, U.S.
- Died: August 9, 2010 (aged 84) Southaven, Mississippi, U.S.
- Genres: Electric blues
- Occupation: Musician
- Instruments: Bass guitar; vocals
- Years active: 1960s–2000s

Calvin "Fuzz" Jones (June 9, 1926 – August 9, 2010) was an American electric blues bassist and singer. He worked with many blues musicians, including Muddy Waters, Howlin' Wolf, the Legendary Blues Band, Mississippi Heat, James Cotton, Luther "Guitar Junior" Johnson, Little Walter and Elmore James.

He contributed to the collaborative 1996 album Eye to Eye, which also featured Pinetop Perkins, Willie "Big Eyes" Smith, Ronnie Earl and Bruce Katz.

== Life and career ==
Jones was born in Greenwood, Mississippi, and raised on a farm near Inverness, Mississippi. In his childhood he learned to play the violin and the acoustic bass, later switching to the electric bass guitar, which became his instrument of choice.

He joined the backing band of Muddy Waters in 1970 and played with the group until 1980. He played on the albums They Call Me Muddy Waters (1971), Muddy "Mississippi" Waters – Live (1979), and King Bee (1981). He became known for his "strong electric bass playing, rocking stage presence, deep blues singing, and the friendly laugh and smile he had for all".

In the 1980 film The Blues Brothers, Jones appeared as the bassist in the blues band on Maxwell Street, Chicago, outside the Soul Food Cafe. The same year, Jones and others from Muddy Waters's backing group formed the Legendary Blues Band, which recorded seven albums with Jones playing bass and occasionally providing vocals, until the group split up, in 1993.

Jones also recorded with Mississippi Heat, performing on their debut album, Straight from the Heart (1993). He played bass guitar duties and was also the lead singer on one track, "Ruby Mae". The song was written by band member Billy Flynn for Jones's wife, Ruby Mae Jones. Jones also performed at the Long Beach Blues Festival that year.

Jones also had spells playing with the Muddy Waters Tribute Band (You Gonna Miss Me (When I'm Dead & Gone), 1997), the Howlin' Wolf Tribute Band, and the Jelly Roll All-Stars. In 1999, Jones played on Barrelhouse Chuck's debut album, Salute to Sunnyland Slim. He backed Cassandra Wilson on her 2003 album, Glamoured, and her recording of "Vietnam Blues", written by J. B. Lenoir.

In later years, Jones lived in Senatobia, Mississippi. He died in Southaven, Mississippi, from complications of lung cancer and a heart attack, in August 2010, aged 84. In 2016 the Killer Blues Headstone Project placed the headstone for Calvin Jones at Mt. Calm church in Coldwater, Mississippi.

== Discography ==
=== Collaboration albums ===
Year	Title	Record label
1996	Eye to Eye	Audioquest Records

With Muddy Waters

- Muddy, Brass & the Blues (Chess, 1966)
- They Call Me Muddy Waters (Chess, 1971)
- Live at Mr. Kelly's (Chess, 1971)
- Can't Get No Grindin' (Chess, 1973)
- "Unk" in Funk (Chess, 1974)
- Muddy "Mississippi" Waters – Live (Blue Sky, 1979)
- King Bee (Blue Sky, 1981)

== See also ==
- List of electric blues musicians
