= Deitra Farr =

American singer-songwriter

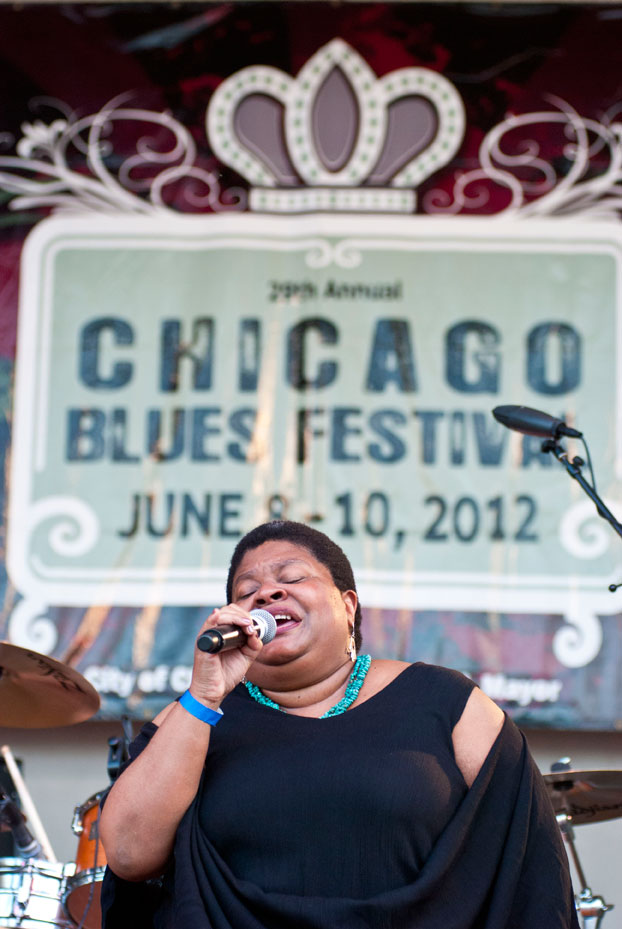
- Chicago Blues Festival, June 10, 2012

Background information
- Birth name: Deitra Farr
- Born: August 1, 1957 (age 67); Chicago, Illinois, United States
- Genres: Blues, soul, gospel
- Occupation: Singer-songwriter
- Instrument: Vocals
- Years active: 1970s–present
- Labels: JSP Records
- Website: Official website

Deitra Farr (born August 1, 1957) is an American blues, soul and gospel singer-songwriter.

== Life and career ==
Farr was born in Chicago, Illinois, United States, and began singing in the mid-1970s with various soul bands. She converted to Catholicism as a child and sang in the gospel choir at Holy Angels Catholic Church on the South Side.

She graduated from Kenwood High School (Academy) in Chicago. She studied vocal music there with Lena McLin and was a member of the Kenwood Choir. At the age of 18, she recorded the lead vocals on "You Won't Support Me" with the Chicago group Mill Street Depo. That song made the Top 100 R&B list with Cashbox magazine in 1976. She began singing the blues in the early 1980s. From 1993 to 1996, she was the lead singer for Mississippi Heat and recorded two albums with them, Learned the Hard Way and Thunder in my Heart.

In 1997, she released her first solo album titled The Search is Over, on the British record label, JSP Records.

In 2005, Farr released her second JSP album, Let It Go. The blues guitarist, Billy Flynn, played on Let It Go.

Since 1990, she has toured internationally, so far performing in over 40 countries. Farr is a graduate of Columbia College Chicago, with a bachelor's degree in journalism. She has a regular column called "Artist to Artist" in Living Blues magazine.

== Awards and recognition ==
In October 2015, Farr was inducted into the Chicago Blues Hall of Fame as a "Legendary Blues Artist". Deitra received "The Koko Taylor Queen of the Blues Award" from the Jus Blues Music Foundation on August 3, 2017.

June 10 was proclaimed Deitra Farr Day in the City of Chicago in 2023.

== Discography ==
=== Singles ===
- " You Won't Support Me" (1976) – lead vocals with Mill Street Depo – Stang/All Platinum Records

=== Solo albums ===
- The Search is Over (1997) – JSP Records
- Let It Go (2005) – JSP Records

=== Compilation and other albums ===
- Our Course has Run (1991) – Dave Spector – Bluebird Blues – Delmark Records
- Chicago Blues Nights (1991) – Various artists – GBW DIW/Tokyo Records
- Burnin Chicago Blues Machine (1991) – Various artists (duets) – GBW DIW/Tokyo Records
- My Ancestors (1991) – Chicago Beau – (duet and background vocals) – GBW DIW/Tokyo Records
- Vinir Dora (1993) – Various artists – Straight Ahead Records
- Chicago's Finest Blues Women (1995) – Various artists – Wolf Records
- Learned the Hard Way (1994) – Mississippi Heat – Van Der Linden Records
- Thunder in My Heart (1995) – Mississippi Heat – Van Der Linden Records
- Undiscovered Gems (1998) – lead vocalist on "You Won't Support Me" – All Platinum Records
- Bop Brother's and Sister's (2000) – Jon T-Bone Taylor – duet on "Like a Fish" – Abacabe Records, London
- Shoulder to the Wind (2000) – Matthew Skoller Band – guest spot on "One More Flower" – Tongue 'N Groove Records
- I Believe in America (2002) – Various artists – lead vocals on "Homesick Blues" – Bradley House Records
- Bob is Back in Town (2006) – Bob Stroger – background vocals – Airway Records
- The Real Deal (2011) – Sharon Lewis – background vocals – Delmark Records
- Soul Gift (2012) – Raphael Wressnig and Alex Schultz -lead vocal on – " All That I've Got" and duet with Tad Robinson on " Ain't Nothing Like The Real Thing " – Pepper Cake Records
- Delta Bound (2012) – Mississippi Heat – lead vocals on "Look-A-Here, Baby","What's Happening to Me" and "Sweet Ol' Blues" – Delmark Records
- Blues from Below (2013) – Brother Jacob – duet and background vocals – Schulz Records
- Moodprints (2015) – Ruud DeVries – vocals on "Talk About Love" – JazzTracks Records
- Captured Live (2017) – Raphael Wressnig – vocals on "All That I've Got" – Pepper Cake Records
- Lonesome Highway (2017) – Billy Flynn – duet on "Good Navigator" and "Hold On" – Delmark Records
- Soul Santa (2017) – Mr. Keith Little – duet on "A Christmas Party" and "Too Many Baby Daddy's"
- Doin' What I'm Supposed to Do (2022) – Demetria Taylor – duet on "Blues Early This Morning" - Delmark Records
- Oscar's Motel (2023) – The Cash Box Kings – duet on "I Can't Stand You" - Alligator Records
- Exile- The Chicago Blues Sessions (2025) – Dov Hammer – duet on "Just Your Fool"

== Bibliography ==
- Today's Chicago Blues, Karen Hanson, Lake Claremont Press, 2007, ISBN 978-1893121195
- Exploring Chicago Blues, Rosalind Cummings-Yeates, The History Press, 2014, ISBN 978-1626193222
