= Barrelhouse Chuck =

American musician (1958–2016)

- Born: Harvey Charles Goering; July 10, 1958; Columbus, Ohio, United States
- Died: December 12, 2016 (aged 58) Libertyville, Illinois, United States
- Genres: Chicago blues, electric blues
- Occupations: Pianist, singer, keyboardist, songwriter
- Instruments: Piano, keyboards, vocals
- Years active: 1970s–2016
- Label: Various
- Website: www.barrelhousechuck.com/index.html

Barrelhouse Chuck (born Harvey Charles Goering; July 10, 1958 – December 12, 2016) was an American Chicago blues and electric blues pianist, keyboardist, singer, and songwriter.

He claimed to be the only Chicago blues pianist to have studied under Sunnyland Slim, Pinetop Perkins, Blind John Davis, Detroit Junior, and Little Brother Montgomery. His work appeared on sixteen albums.

== Life and career ==
Goering was born and raised in Columbus, Ohio, and learned to play the drums by the age of six. He later graduated to the piano. He relocated with his family to Gainesville, Florida, before he first heard a Muddy Waters record. It was by listening to blues records that Barrelhouse Chuck learned the techniques of blues piano playing. He formed his own bands in his teenage years, including the Red Rooster Band, Red House, and Barrelhouse Chuck & the Blue Lights, and followed Muddy Waters around the South, trying to pick up playing tips from Waters's pianist, Pinetop Perkins. In 1979, he drove from Florida to Chicago to introduce himself to Sunnyland Slim. Barrelhouse Chuck spent the next decade and a half studying his playing, along with that of other Chicago blues musicians, including Blind John Davis, Little Brother Montgomery, and Erwin Helfer. In the company of Montgomery for a long time, Barrelhouse Chuck later remarked, "Little Brother was like a grandfather to me".

Barrelhouse Chuck played or recorded with Jimmy Rogers, Eddie Taylor, Hubert Sumlin, Otis Rush, Buddy Guy, and Otis "Big Smokey" Smothers. For a time in the late 1990s he played with Mississippi Heat, and he undertook a tour with Nick Moss and the Flip Tops.

His debut album, Salute to Sunnyland Slim, released by Blue Loon Records in 1999, contained supporting work from S.P. Leary, Calvin "Fuzz" Jones and Willie "Big Eyes" Smith. It was reissued in 2005. The follow-up was Prescription for the Blues (2002), with Erwin Helfer playing on three tracks. Barrelhouse Chuck released the album Got My Eyes on You in 2006, with Kim Wilson playing the harmonica.

In February 2008, Wilson asked Barrelhouse Chuck to assist in recording the soundtrack for the film Cadillac Records. His other credits include numerous appearances at the Chicago Blues Festival.

As at 2012, Barrelhouse Chuck maintained a full performance schedule in Chicago, around the United States, and occasionally abroad, including a regular solo appearance on Wednesday nights at the Barrelhouse Flat, a bar in Lincoln Park. On February 24, 2012, Barrelhouse Chuck played at the "Howlin' for Hubert" concert at the Apollo Theater.

In 2013 and 2014, Barrelhouse Chuck was nominated for a Blues Music Award in the category Pinetop Perkins Piano Player. In 2014 Drifting from Town to Town was nominated for a Blues Music Award in the category Traditional Blues Album of the Year.

On December 12, 2016, Barrelhouse Chuck died after a long battle with prostate cancer, at the age of 58.

== Discography ==
Year	Title	Record label
1999	Salute to Sunnyland Slim	Blue Loon Records
2000	25 Years of Chicago Blues Piano, vol. 1	Viola Records
2002	Prescription for the Blues	The Sirens Records
2002	8 Hands on 88 Keys	The Sirens Records
2006	Slowdown Sundown	Viola Records
2006	25 Years of Chicago Blues Piano, vol. 2	Viola Records
2006	Got My Eyes on You	The Sirens Records
2008	25 Years of Chicago Blues Piano, vol. 3	Viola Records
2008	25 Years of Chicago Blues Piano, vol. 4	Viola Records
2008	25 Years of Chicago Blues Piano, vol. 5	Viola Records
2010	Combo Classics	Viola Records
2011	Blues Calling	Viola Records
2012	Son of the Seventh Son with Mud Morganfield	Severn Records
2013	Drifting from Town to Town	The Sirens Records
2013	35 Years of Chicago Blues Piano, vols. 1 & 2	Viola Records
2014	For Pops (A Tribute To Muddy Waters) with Mud Morganfield & Kim Wilson	Severn Records
2016	Remembering The Masters	The Sirens Records
