= Rhythm Willie =

American Chicago blues musician

- Born: William Hood c. September 15, 1910
- Died: before May 18, 1954 (aged 43)
- Genres: Chicago blues; Jazz
- Instrument: Harmonica
- Years active: 1930s–1954

Rhythm Willie, born William Hood (c. September 15, 1910 – May, 1954) was an American Chicago blues musician, who appeared on 16 issued recordings between 1939 and 1950.

== Biography ==
Rhythm Willie was a harmonica player active in the Chicago area of the United States. Willie was first advertised in Chicago newspapers in October 1938, where he was often touted as "King Of The Harmonica" or "The Harmonica Wizard." Willie performed in upscale black nightclubs in Chicago, such as the Club Delisa and the Rhumboogie Café. Willie made his recording debut in 1939, accompanying blues pianist Peetie Wheatstraw on five sides. Willie's distinctive harmonica playing is easily identifiable above Wheatstraw's piano. On the same day, Willie accompanied blues pianist Lee Brown on four sides.

Willie made his first recordings as leader in October 1940, cutting four sides, all of them instrumental, showcasing his highly advanced abilities on the harmonica. After this session, Willie would not return to the recording studio until 1947, accompanying Earl Bostic and his orchestra. None of the recordings from this session were issued at the time. Willie made his final recordings in 1950, where he led an orchestra on two sides. Willie continued playing live after his final recording session, and was advertised as having played in the months leading up to his death.

Willie died in early 1954 at the age of 43. An obituary in the Chicago Defender, gave his funeral date as May 18, 1954.

== Recordings ==
=== Recorded September 14, 1939 for Decca Records in Chicago ===
Accompanying Peetie Wheatstraw:

- "You Can't Stop Me From Drinkin'" - 7692
- "I Want Some Seafood" - 7657
- "Rollin' Chair" - 7676
- "Love Bug" - 7676
- "Confidence Man" - 7692

Accompanying Lee Brown:

- "Little Brownskin Girl" - 7686
- "Lock and Key Blues" - 7654
- "Treated Like A Dog" - 7654
- "My Drivin' Wheel" - 7686

=== Recorded October 10, 1940 for Okeh Records in Chicago ===
Credited as Rhythm Willie & His Gang:

- "New Block and Tackle Blues" - 05856
- "Breathtakin' Blues" - 05960
- "Bedroom Stomp" - 05856
- "Boarding House Blues" - 05960

=== Recorded September 1947 in New York City ===
Accompanying Earl Bostic Orchestra:

- "Willie's Boogie" - unissued
- Unissued record
- Unissued record
- Unissued record

=== Recorded November 4, 1950 for Premium Records in Chicago ===
Credited as Rhythm Willie, His Harmonica, And Orchestra:

- "Wailin' Willie" - PR-866
- "I've Got Rhythm" - PR-866
