= Gerry Hundt =

American singer

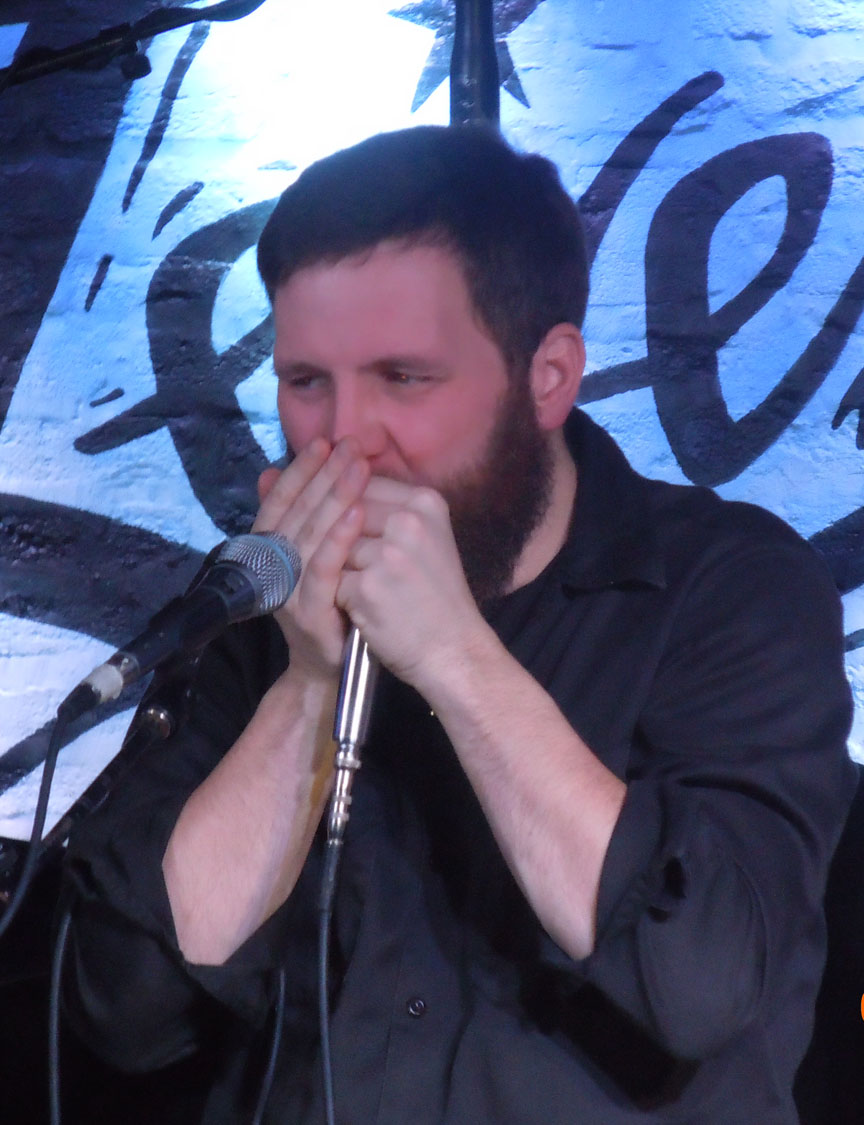
- Gerry Hundt at Buddy Guy's Legends in January 2013

Background information
- Born: May 29, 1977 (age 49)
- Origin: Appleton, Wisconsin, United States
- Genres: Chicago blues, electric blues
- Occupations: Mandolin, guitarist, harmonicist, singer,
- Instruments: Mandolin, guitar, harmonica, vocals

Gerry Hundt (born May 29, 1977) is an American Chicago blues musician and multi-instrumentalist. His favoured instrument is the mandolin. Hundt released his debut solo album, Since Way Back, in early 2007.

== Biography ==
Born in Appleton, Wisconsin, United States, Hundt's family relocated to Rockford, Illinois, when he was aged three.

He has garnered respect for his work with other musicians such as John-Alex Mason and Nick Moss. This led to his 2007 solo album, Since Way Back, (on Blue Bella Records), which earned him nominations for the Blues Foundation's Blues Music Award for 'Best Instrumentalist, Other (mandolin)' in 2008, 2009, 2010, and 2011.

In 2015, Steadygroove Music released Gerry Hundt's Legendary One-Man-Band.

== Discography ==
- Since Way Back (2007)
- Gerry Hundt's Legendary One-Man-Band (2015)
