= The Legendary Blues Band =

American Chicago blues band

- Origin: Chicago, Illinois, United States
- Genres: Chicago blues
- Years active: 1980–1993
- Past members: John Primer; Willie "Big Eyes" Smith; Pinetop Perkins; Jerry Portnoy; Calvin "Fuzz" Jones; Louis Myers; Daryl Davis; Billy Flynn; Madison Slim; Little Smokey Smothers; Nick Moss; John Duich; Willy O'Shawny; Tony O Melio

The Legendary Blues Band was a Chicago blues band formed in 1980 after the breakup of Muddy Waters' band.

== Biography ==
In June 1980, Muddy Waters' backing musicians Willie "Big Eyes" Smith (drums), Pinetop Perkins (piano), Calvin "Fuzz" Jones (bass guitar), Luther "Guitar Junior" Johnson (guitar), Bob Margolin (guitar) and Jerry Portnoy (harmonica) quit over a salary dispute. The year before, Smith, Jones, Johnson and Perkins backed John Lee Hooker and Big Walter Horton in the film The Blues Brothers, playing a live version of "Boom Boom" in the Maxwell Street Market. Smith was the only band member to appear in close-up. In 1981, Portnoy, Jones, Smith and Perkins formed the Legendary Blues Band, using a monicker Muddy Waters used to introduce them when on stage. Guitarist Bob Margolin chose not to join them and formed his own band and was replaced by Louis Myers on harmonica and guitar. The Legendary Blues Band recorded their debut album Life of Ease for Rounder Records. Duke Robillard guested on their second release Red Hot 'n' Blue.

The Legendary Blues Band recorded seven albums, Life of Ease, Red Hot 'n' Blue, Woke Up with the Blues (nominated for a W. C. Handy Award), Keepin' the Blues Alive, U B Da Judge, Prime Time Blues, and Money Talks, between 1981 and 1993 and toured with Bob Dylan, The Rolling Stones and Eric Clapton.

Later recordings included Billy Flynn, Little Smokey Smothers, Tony O. Melio, Nick Moss and Madison Slim although the rhythm section of Jones and Smith remained through to their final release in 1993.

== Discography ==
- Life of Ease (1981) – Rounder
- Red Hot 'n' Blue (1983) – Rounder
- Woke up with the Blues (1989) – Ichiban
- Keepin' the Blues Alive (1990) – Ichiban
- U B Da Judge (1991) – Ichiban
- Prime Time Blues (1992) – Ichiban
- Money Talks (1993) – Wild Dog Blues
