= Blind John Davis =

American pianist and singer (1913–1985)

- Born: John Henry Davis; December 7, 1913; Hattiesburg, Mississippi, U.S.
- Died: October 12, 1985 (aged 71) Chicago, Illinois, U.S.
- Genres: Blues, boogie-woogie
- Occupation: Musician
- Instruments: Piano, vocals
- Years active: 1933–1985
- Labels: Vocalion, Disques Vogue, Riverside, Happy Bird, Christi, Oldie Blues, Sirens, L&R, Red Beans
- Formerly of: Johnny Lee's Music Masters

Blind John Davis (December 7, 1913 – October 12, 1985) was an American blues and boogie-woogie pianist and singer. He is best remembered for his recordings, including "A Little Every Day" and "Everybody's Boogie".

== Early life ==
Davis was born in Hattiesburg, Mississippi, and relocated with his family to Chicago at the age of two. Seven years later, he had lost his sight. In his early years Davis backed Merline Johnson, and by his mid-twenties he was a well-known and reliable accompanying pianist.

== Career ==
Between 1937 and 1942, David recorded with Big Bill Broonzy, Sonny Boy Williamson I, Tampa Red, Red Nelson, Merline Johnson, and others. He also made several records of his own, singing in his lightweight voice.

Having played in various recording sessions with Lonnie Johnson, Davis teamed up with him in the 1940s. He recorded later on his own. His "No Mail Today" (1949) was a minor hit. Most of Doctor Clayton's later recordings featured Davis on piano.

He toured Europe with Broonzy in 1952, the first blues pianist to do so. In later years Davis toured and recorded frequently in Europe, where he enjoyed a higher profile than in the United States.

== House fire ==
In 1955, Davis's house in Chicago burned down. His wife died in the fire, and his collection of 1700 78-rpm records, some of them unissued, was destroyed.

== Death ==
Davis died in Chicago on October 12, 1985. He was 71. In 2016 the Killer Blues Headstone Project placed the headstone for John Davis at Burr Oak Cemetery in Alsip, Illinois.

== Discography ==
- The Incomparable Blind John Davis (1974), Oldie Blues OL 2803
- Alive "Live" and Well (1976), Chrischaa
- Heavy Timbre: Chicago Boogie Piano (1976, re-released 2002), Sirens Records
- Stompin' on a Saturday Night (1978), Alligator
- You Better Cut That Out (1985), Red Beans
- Blind John Davis [Story of Blues] (1991), Story of Blues

== See also ==
- List of boogie woogie musicians
- List of Chicago blues musicians
- Piano blues
