= Otis "Big Smokey" Smothers =

American blues guitarist and singer

- Born: March 21, 1929; Lexington, Mississippi, U.S.
- Died: July 23, 1993 (aged 64) Chicago, Illinois, U.S.
- Genres: Chicago blues
- Occupations: Musician, singer
- Instruments: Guitar, vocals
- Years active: Early 1950s–1993
- Label: Various

Otis "Big Smokey" Smothers (March 21, 1929 – July 23, 1993) was an American Chicago blues guitarist and singer. He was a member of Howlin' Wolf's backing band and worked with Muddy Waters, Jimmy Rogers, Bo Diddley, Ike Turner, J. T. Brown, Freddie King, Little Johnny Jones, Little Walter, and Willie Dixon. His younger brother, Abe (born Albert, January 2, 1939 – November 20, 2010), was the bluesman Little Smokey Smothers, with whom he is sometimes confused.

== Biography ==
=== Early life ===
Smothers, who was African-American, was born in Lexington, Mississippi, and was taught by his aunt to play the harmonica and the guitar. He relocated to Chicago in 1946.

=== Career ===
His debut performance on stage was with Johnny Williams and Johnny "Man" Young. In the early part of the 1950s, Smothers played alongside his cousin Lester Davenport and with Arthur "Big Boy" Spires, Earl Hooker, Henry Strong, and Bo Diddley.

In 1956 and 1957, Howlin' Wolf invited Smothers to play as his rhythm guitarist on several tracks recorded for Chess Records, including "Who's Been Talking", "Tell Me", "Change My Way", "Goin' Back Home", "The Natchez Burning", and "I Asked for Water". Smothers secured a recording contract with Federal Records in August 1960. His album Smokey Smothers Sings the Backporch Blues, produced by Sonny Thompson, with Freddie King on lead guitar on some tracks, was released in 1962. A subsequent session produced four tracks, including "Twist with Me Annie", a reworked version of "Work with Me, Annie". As a part-time member of Muddy Waters's backing band, Smothers played on "I Got My Eyes on You" in 1968.

Smothers helped to form the Muddy Waters Junior Band in the late 1950s, as a tribute to Waters. When Waters was on the road, the band would hold down his regular residency gigs in Chicago, performing Waters's songs and serving as a training ground for potential future members of Waters's band, which both Smothers and fellow Junior Band member George "Mojo" Buford eventually joined.

The 1970s were a lean time for Smothers. He returned to recording in 1986, when Red Beans Records issued his album Got My Eyes on You. His backing band was billed as the Ice Cream Men, a nod to his having worked as an ice cream vendor in the 1950s.

Smothers wrote songs for Waters and has a catalogue of songs to his credit, including "I've Been Drinking Muddy Water", "Ain't Gon Be No Monkey Man", and "Can't Judge Nobody."

=== Personal life and legacy ===
Later in his life, Smothers suffered from heart disease. He died in Chicago at the age of 64, in July 1993. He was survived by his wife, Earline Smothers, and by their sons and daughters, his five brothers and sisters, and his extended family.

His daughter, Crystal Q'Nef Smothers, produced a Blues Tribute on the Smothers brothers in 2016, which was held in Chicago. A documentary was produced by Ms. Smothers in 2019, based on the life stories of both Smothers brothers.

His rapper granddaughter took on the stage name Smokey Smothers.

== Discography ==
=== Albums ===
- Smokey Smothers Sings the Backporch Blues (1962), King
- Drivin' Blues (1966), King (reissue of Sings the Backporch Blues)
- Got My Eyes on You (1986), Red Beans

With Howlin' Wolf

- The Real Folk Blues (Chess, 1956-64 [1965])

=== Compilation albums ===
- Chicago Blues Session Volume 1 (1998), Wolf

== Bibliography ==
- Larkin, Colin, ed. The Guinness Encyclopedia of Popular Music. vol. 5. New York City, New York: Stockton Press & Guinness Publishing Ltd, 1995.

== See also ==
- List of Chicago blues musicians
