= Chicago Blues Festival =

Annual music festival in the United States

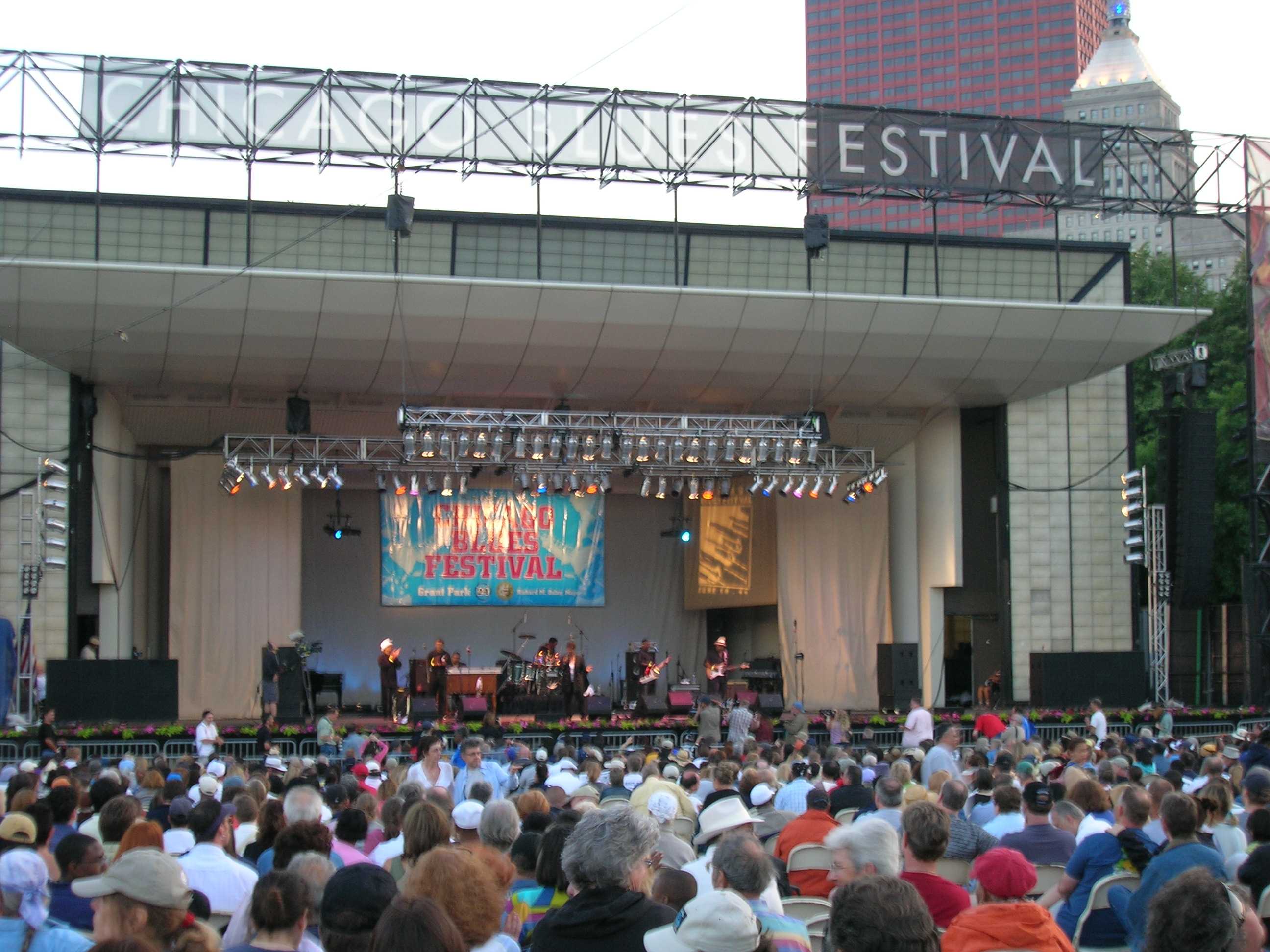
- The Blues Festival stage at the Petrillo Music Shell before nightfall
- Genre: Blues
- Dates: early June
- Locations: Millennium Park; City of Chicago
- Years active: since 1984 (except 2020)
- Website: chicagobluesfestival.us

The Chicago Blues Festival is an annual event held in June, that features three days of performances by top-tier blues musicians, both old favorites and the up-and-coming. It is hosted by the City of Chicago Department of Cultural Affairs and Special Events (formerly the Mayor's Office of Special Events), and occurs in early June. Until 2017, the event took place at and around Petrillo Music Shell in Grant Park, adjacent to the Lake Michigan waterfront east of the Loop in Chicago. In 2017, the festival was moved to the nearby Millennium Park.

== History of the festival ==
Chicago has a storied history with blues that goes back generations stemming from the Great Migration from the South and particularly the Mississippi Delta region in pursuit of advancement and better career possibilities for musicians. Created by Commissioner of Cultural Affairs Lois Weisberg, the festival began in 1984, a year after the death of McKinley Morganfield, better known as Muddy Waters, who is generally considered "the father of Chicago blues". Each year the organizers choose a theme, generally to honor a recently departed blues musician. Obviously, Chicago blues acts are common. In 2015, the festival celebrated the centenary of the births of Muddy Waters and Willie Dixon. The Centennial Tribute featured several musicians who had played with Muddy Waters as well as his sons Mud Morganfield and Big Bill Morganfield, with Alex Dixon playing bass. Also, in keeping with the blues' influence on other musical genres, there are some soul, jazz blues and blues-rock acts.

There was no festival in 2020.

Since those early beginnings the festival has risen to a status that the City of Chicago has billed as the world's largest free concert of its kind, and the largest of the city's music festivals. For many years through 2016, the festival's "Route 66 Roadhouse" side stage was located a few yards north of historic old U.S. Route 66 (Jackson Boulevard, with traffic closed off for the festival), and a block west of Route 66's former eastern terminus at US 41 Lake Shore Drive.

== Notable performers ==
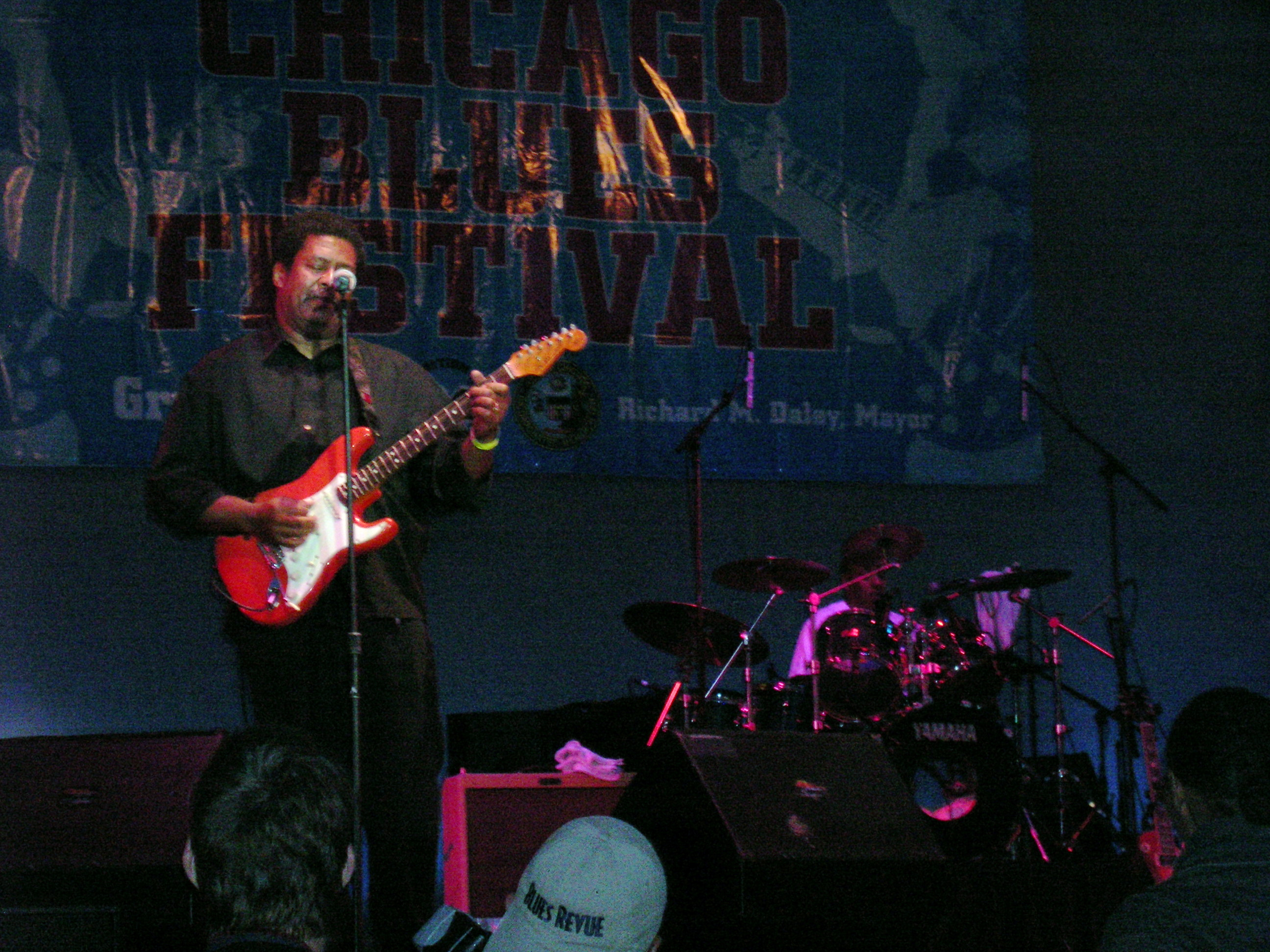
A Blues Festival performer plays jazz

Albert King, The Aces, B. B. King, Bill Doggett, Golden "Big" Wheeler, Billy Branch, Bo Diddley, Bobby "Blue" Bland, Bobby Rush, Buckwheat Zydeco, Buddy Guy, Calvin Jones, Carey Bell, Carl Perkins, Barrelhouse Chuck, Chuck Berry, Clarence "Gatemouth" Brown, Dave Myers, Dion Payton, Dr. John, Eddie Boyd, Eddie C. Campbell, Eddie Vinson, Eddy Clearwater, Etta James, Fenton Robinson, Floyd Jones, Fontella Bass, Hank Ballard, Henry Townsend, Homesick James, Hubert Sumlin, James Cotton, Jerry Portnoy, Jimmy Johnson, Jimmy Rogers, Jimmie Lee Robinson, Jody Williams, John Lee Hooker, Johnnie Taylor, John Brim, Johnny Shines, Johnny Winter, Junior Wells, Keith Richards, Koko Taylor, Little Milton, Little Willie Littlefield, Lonnie Brooks, Lowell Fulson, Louisiana Red, Luther Allison, Eddie Cusic, Lurrie Bell, Magic Slim, Matt Murphy, Memphis Slim, George "Mojo" Buford, Mick Taylor, The Neville Brothers, Otis Rush, Pee Wee Crayton, Ike Turner, Pinetop Perkins, Ray Charles, Robert Cray Band, Robert Lockwood, Jr., Sam Lay, Otis "Big Smokey" Smothers, Snooky Pryor, Son Seals, Lacy Gibson, Staple Singers, Stevie Ray Vaughan, Sugar Blue, Sunnyland Slim, Grady Champion, Johnny Dollar, Taj Mahal, Willie Dixon, Yank Rachell, Lil' Ed Williams and the Blues Imperials, Johnny B. Moore, Terry "Harmonica" Bean, Harmonica Hinds, Linsey Alexander, Toronzo Cannon, Liz Mandeville, Nora Jean Bruso, Holle Thee Maxwell, Eddie Taylor Jr.

== See also ==
- List of blues festivals
- List of folk festivals
