= Wayne Baker Brooks =

American blues guitarist and singer

- Also known as: Wayne Brooks, WBB
- Born: Wayne Baker; April 30, 1970 (age 56)
- Origin: Chicago, Illinois, United States
- Genres: Chicago blues, electric blues, blues rock
- Occupations: Musician, singer, songwriter, author
- Instruments: Vocals, electric guitar
- Years active: 1990–present
- Label: Blues Island
- Website: www.waynebakerbrooks.com

Wayne Baker Brooks (born April 30, 1970, in Chicago, Illinois) is an American blues and blues-rock guitarist and singer.

== Biography ==
The son of the Chicago blues musician Lonnie Brooks, he joined his father's band playing guitar in the band in 1990. In 1997, he formed the Wayne Baker Brooks Band. In 1998 he spearheaded and co-authored the book Blues for Dummies with Cub Koda and Lonnie Brooks, published in August that year. On October 27, 1998, he and his band performed for then–First Lady Hillary Clinton at Willie Dixon's Blues Heaven Foundation/Chess Records, in Chicago.

On July 15, 2003, Brooks performed at U.S. Cellular Field in front of 47,000 people at the Major League Baseball All Star Game.

Brooks started his own record label in 2003 and released his debut album, Mystery on October 26, 2004, receiving numerous accolades, including four stars from Allmusic.

== Discography ==
Album	Year	Label	Song	Instrument
Sweet Emotion: The Songs of Aerosmith	2001	Heavy Hip Mamma	"Last Child"	Lead guitar, solo
Genuine Houserockin' Christmas	2003	Alligator Records	"Christmas on the Bayou"	Rhythm guitar
Mystery	2004	Blues Island Records	All tracks	Lead guitar, lead vocals

== Awards ==
- Real Blues Magazine Awards
  - Best Blues Book (Blues for Dummies), 1998
  - Carry-the-Blues-Torch Award, 2004
  - Top Blues-Stars-of-the-Future Award, 2004
