= Golden "Big" Wheeler =

American blues musician (1929–1998)

- Born: Golden Wheeler; December 15, 1929; Baconton, Georgia, United States
- Died: July 20, 1998 (aged 68); Chicago, Illinois, United States
- Genres: Chicago blues, electric blues
- Occupations: Singer, harmonicist, songwriter
- Instruments: Vocals, harmonica
- Years active: Late 1940s–1998
- Label: Delmark

Golden "Big" Wheeler (December 15, 1929 – July 20, 1998) was an American Chicago blues and electric blues singer, harmonicist and songwriter. He released two albums in his lifetime and is best known for his recordings of the songs "Damn Good Mojo" and "Bone Orchard". He worked with the Ice Cream Men and Jimmy Johnson. He was the brother of the blues musician James Wheeler.

== Biography ==
He was born Golden Wheeler in Baconton, Georgia. He left Georgia in 1941 and settled in Chicago, Illinois, in July 1954, where he befriended Little Walter. His enthusiasm for playing the harmonica began when he was working as a taxicab driver. One of his regular customers was the harmonica player Buster Brown, who later had a hit record with "Fannie Mae", in 1960. Wheeler fronted his own band by 1956, although he was a part-time musician, working for years as an auto mechanic to supplement his income and provide for his family.

In 1993, Wheeler released his first album, Bone Orchard, on which he was backed by a local band, the Ice Cream Men. Released by Delmark Records (Delmark 661), it recreated a 1950s feel, with backing two guitars and drums, but no bass guitar. The Ice Cream Men were Rockin' Johnny Burgin and Dave Waldman (guitars) and Steve Cushing (drums). The album was produced by Bob Koester.

His next album was Jump In (1997), with backing that provided a fuller sound, including his brother, James Wheeler, on guitar. Other musicians who played on the album were Baldhead Pete (drums), Allen Batts (piano) and Bob Stroger (bass), with Koester again producing.

Wheeler died of heart failure in Chicago in July 1998, at the age of 68. The Killer Blues Headstone Project placed a headstone for Wheeler at Mt. Hope Cemetery in Chicago in 2016.

== Discography ==
=== Albums ===
- Bone Orchard (1993), Delmark
- Jump In (1997), Delmark

== See also ==
- List of Chicago blues musicians
- List of harmonicists
