= George "Mojo" Buford =

American blues harmonica player

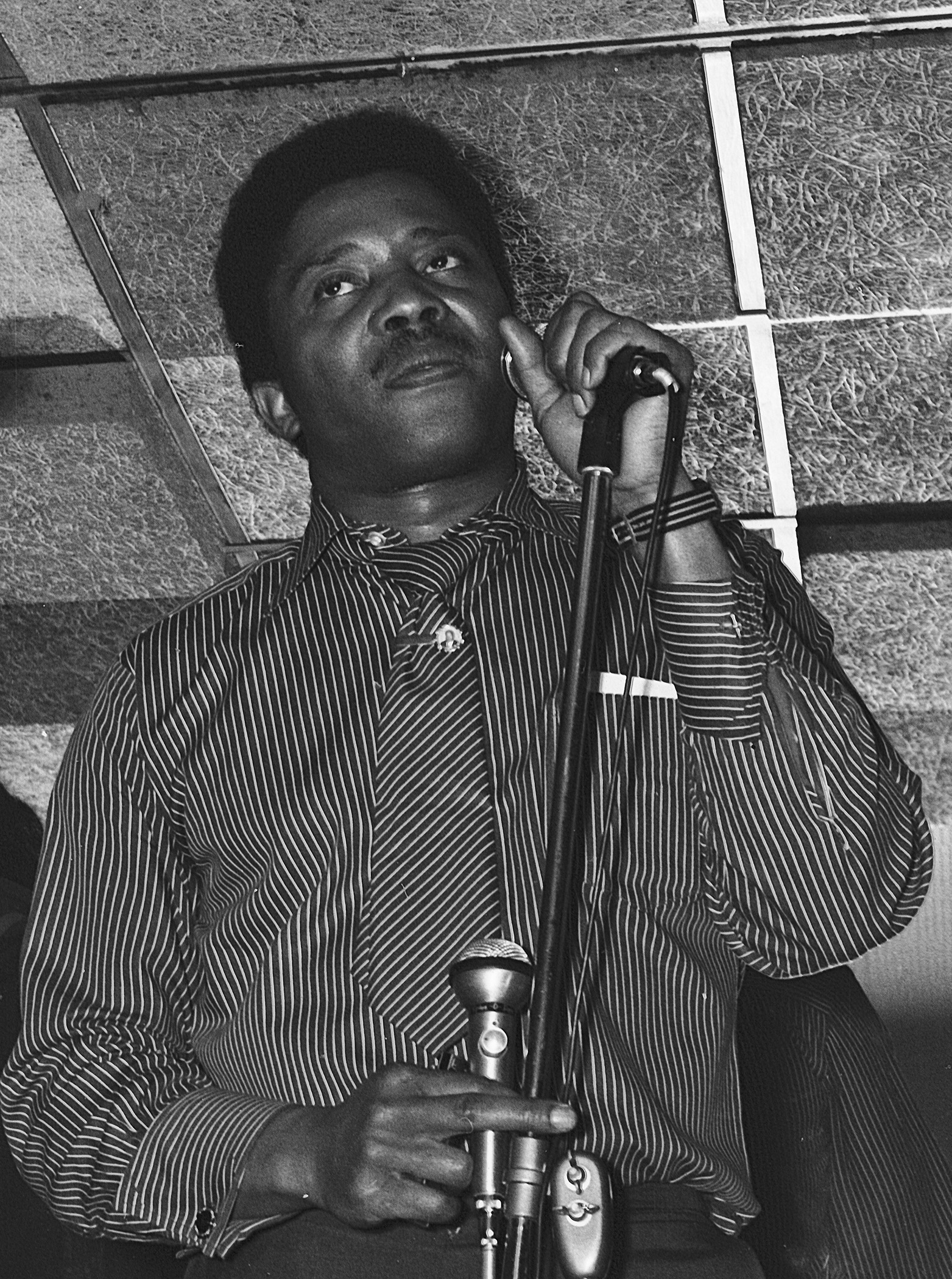
- Buford in 1970

Background information
- Born: George Carter Buford Jr. November 10, 1929; Hernando, Mississippi, U.S.
- Died: October 11, 2011 (aged 81) Minneapolis, Minnesota, U.S.
- Genres: Blues
- Occupation: Musician
- Instruments: Harmonica; vocals
- Years active: Early 1950s–2011

George Carter "Mojo" Buford Jr. (November 10, 1929 – October 11, 2011), was an American blues harmonica player best known for his work in Muddy Waters's band.

== Biography ==
Buford relocated from Hernando, Mississippi, to Memphis, Tennessee, in his youth, where he studied the blues. He relocated to Chicago in 1952, forming the Savage Boys, which eventually was known as the Muddy Waters, Jr. Band. They substituted for Waters at local nightclubs while he was touring.

Buford first played in Waters's backing band in 1959, replacing Little Walter, but in 1962 moved to Minneapolis to front his own band and to record albums. In Minneapolis he gained the nickname Mojo, because of audiences requesting him to perform his cover version of "Got My Mojo Working." Buford returned to Waters's combo in 1967 for a year, replacing James Cotton. He had a longer tenure with Waters in the early 1970s and returned for the final time after Jerry Portnoy departed to form the Legendary Blues Band.

He also recorded for the Mr. Blues label. These recordings were later reissued by Rooster Blues, Blue Loon Records, and the British JSP label.

Buford died on October 11, 2011, at the age of 81, in Minneapolis, after a long hospitalization.

== Discography ==
- Exciting Harmonica Sound of Mojo Buford, BluesRecordSoc, 1963
- Mojo Buford's Chicago Blues Summit, Rooster Blues, 1979
- State of the Blues Harp, JSP, 1989
- Harpslinger, Blue Loon, 1993
- Still Blowin' Strong (Blue Loon, 1996)
- Home Is Where My Harps Is, Blue Loon, 1998
- Champagne & Reefer, Fedora Records, 1999
- Blues Ain't a Color, Kpnbeat, 2005
- Mojo Workin’, Sundazed, 2020

With Otis Spann

- The Bottom of the Blues (BluesWay, 1968)

With Muddy Waters

- "Unk" in Funk (Chess, 1974)

== See also ==
- List of Chicago blues musicians
- List of harmonica blues musicians
- List of harmonicists
