= Bob Stroger =

American electric blues musician

- Born: December 27, 1930 (age 95); Hayti, Missouri, United States
- Genres: Blues
- Occupations: Guitarist, singer, songwriter
- Instruments: Bass guitar; vocals
- Years active: 1960s–present

Bob Stroger (born December 27, 1930) is an American electric blues bass guitarist, singer and songwriter. He has worked with many blues musicians, including Eddie King, Otis Rush, Jimmy Rogers, Eddie Taylor, Eddy Clearwater, Sunnyland Slim, Louisiana Red, Buster Benton, Homesick James, Mississippi Heat, Snooky Pryor, Odie Payne, Fred Below, Willie "Big Eyes" Smith, and Billy Davenport.

In 2011 and 2013, Stroger was granted a Blues Music Award as Best Blues Bassist.

== Life and career ==
Stroger was born on a farm outside of Hayti, Missouri. In 1955, he relocated with his family to Chicago, Illinois. His family settled on the West Side, in an apartment in back of Silvio's nightclub. Stroger was inspired by the sights and sounds from the club. He was further encouraged to try for a career in music, after being employed driving his brother-in-law to play in a blues band with J. B. Hutto. A self-taught guitarist, he formed a family-based band, the Red Tops (the band members wore black berets with a red circle daubed on top). Willie Kent was drafted to boost their proficiency, and the combo was renamed Joe Russell and the Blues Hustlers (Stroger had adopted the stage name Joe Russell, but the name did not endure). He went on to play jazz with Rufus Forman, but it was his meeting with Eddie King which started his lengthy career playing blues. Having started playing the bass guitar, Stroger played on King's single "Love You Baby" (1965).

He backed King for fifteen years before King relocated, after which Stroger stopped playing for a couple of years. His interest was rekindled when he was recommended to Otis Rush, whom he backed in the late 1970s and 1980s. He toured Europe with Rush and played on two of his albums, Live in Europe and Lost in the Blues.

Stroger next was a session musician for a while. He worked with Sunnyland Slim and Mississippi Heat in the late 1980s and early 1990s. He then joined Odie Payne in the regular rhythm section for the series of American Blues Folk Festivals. Encouraged by Sunnyland Slim, Stroger began singing and writing his own material. In 1996, Stroger played on Mark Hummel's album, Heart of Chicago. In 1997, he played bass on Golden "Big" Wheeler's album Jump In. The following year, he played with a group of musicians at the Lucerne Blues Festival in Switzerland. This led to the recording of his debut solo album, In the House: Live at Lucerne, Vol. 1, on which he was accompanied by Ken Saydak and Billy Flynn.

In 2007, Stroger recorded Bob Is Back in Town in Chicago, backed by Steve Freund (guitar), Willie "Big Eyes" Smith (harmonica), Deitra Farr (backing vocals), and Juli Wood (baritone saxophone). The same year he backed Carey Bell on his final recorded work, Gettin' Up: Live at Buddy Guy's Legends, Rosa's and Lurrie's Home (Delmark). He also played on Willie "Big Eyes" Smith's albums Born in Arkansas (2008) and Joined at the Hip (with Pinetop Perkins, 2010).

In 2011, the Blues Foundation presented Stroger with a Blues Music Award in the category Best Blues Bassist. He was nominated in the same category in 2013. He won the Best Bassist Award again in 2013. He was named to the Blues Hall of Fame in 2025.

== Discography ==
=== Solo albums ===
Year	Title	Record label
2002	In the House: Live at Lucerne, vol. 1	Crosscut Records (Germany)
2007	Bob Is Back in Town	Airway Records
2022	That's My Name	Delmark Records

=== Collaboration albums ===
Year	Title	Record label
1983	Blues Meeting in Chicago	Strawberry Records

== See also ==
- List of Chicago blues musicians
- List of electric blues musicians
