= Billy Flynn (musician) =

American blues musician

- Born: August 11, 1956 (age 68); Green Bay, Wisconsin, United States
- Genres: Chicago blues, electric blues
- Occupation(s): Guitarist, singer, songwriter
- Instrument(s): Guitar, mandolin
- Years active: 1970s–present
- Labels: Easy Baby, Land O' Blues
- Website: billyflynn.com

Billy Flynn (born August 11, 1956) is an American Chicago blues and electric blues guitarist, singer and songwriter.

In addition to his own work and works mentioned later, he has worked and recorded with Bryan Lee, Little Smokey Smothers, Mark Hummel, Willie Kent, Snooky Pryor, Big Bill Morganfield, John Brim, Jody Williams, Little Arthur Duncan, Deitra Farr, and Billy Boy Arnold.

== Biography ==
Flynn was born in Green Bay, Wisconsin. In 1970, a local blues club opened and Flynn was inspired by the music provided there by Luther Allison, Johnny Littlejohn and Mighty Joe Young. Flynn was fortunate to be spotted playing outside the venue by Jimmy Dawkins, who arranged for Flynn to play with him on stage. Flynn joined Dawkins's backing band in 1975, and he played and toured with them until the end of the decade.

Flynn also worked locally during this period and played alongside Sunnyland Slim. In the early part of the 1980s, Flynn was a member of the touring ensemble Jim Liban and the Futuramics. In the late 1980s, he joined the Legendary Blues Band. He also played with Mississippi Heat.

Willie "Big Eyes" Smith's 2008 album, Born in Arkansas, used Flynn, plus bassist Bob Stroger, pianist Barrelhouse Chuck, Little Frank Krakowski and Smith's son, drummer Kenny "Beedy Eyes" Smith.

In August 2010, Flynn and Kid Ramos backed Kim Wilson at the Edmonton's Labatt Blues Festival.

== Discography ==
=== Solo albums ===
Year	Title	Record label
2005	Billy's Blues	Easy Baby
2005	Chicago Blues Mandolin	Easy Baby
2009	Blues Drive Vol. 1–2	Land O' Blues
2017	Lonesome Highway	Delmark Records

== See also ==
- List of blues mandolinists
- List of Chicago blues musicians
- List of electric blues musicians
