= Heritage Records (England) =

Record label

Heritage Records was a British independent record label located in London, England. It was founded in 1959 by Tony Standish, specialising in blues and early jazz recordings. Only nine completed LPs are known to exist on this label - as well as one unfinished album by Smith Casey in 1963 which did not reach the release stage. The rarity of this label is compounded by the fact that most LPs on the label were only issued as limited editions (99 copies), which makes it difficult to locate any of them. The label was catalogued from HLP 1001 through to HLP 1011 - though as yet, HLP 1009, and HLP 1010 remain undiscovered. In 1963, Standish returned to his native Australia and opened his Heritage Records shop above Frank Traynor's Folk Club in Melbourne. Because of this the Heritage label is often mistakenly thought of as an Australian label, despite the label and its releases all being based in London, England.

Besides re-issuing pre World War II blues recordings of Blind Blake, Papa Charlie Jackson, Blind Lemon Jefferson, Ramblin' Thomas and others; it released contemporary recordings of Lightnin' Hopkins with his brother Joel, Snooks Eaglin, Buster Pickens, Black Ace, and Maxwell Street blues artists such as Blind Jim Brewer and Arvella Gray.

While blues dominated, Heritage also issued early jazz material consistent with the traditional jazz revival then active in Britain such as Jimmy O’Bryant’s Famous Original Washboard Band.

== See also ==
- List of record labels
