= Jim Brewer (blues musician) =

American songwriter

James Brewer (October 3, 1920 – June 3, 1988), also known as Blind Jim Brewer (although Brewer did not like this additive: "My mother didn't name me "Blind", she named me "Jim"), was an American blues singer and guitarist.

Born in Brookhaven, Mississippi, United States, he moved to Chicago, Illinois, in the 1940s, spending the latter part of his life busking and performing both blues and religious songs at blues and folk festivals, on Chicago's Maxwell Street and other venues. In Chicago, he often performed with Arvella Gray. In the 'boom' time during the 1960s blues revival period, Brewer worked on the college circuit and appeared on television. During that time, he had recordings issued on Heritage, Flyright and Testament Records.

== Studio albums ==
- Jim Brewer (Philo, 1974)
- Tough Luck (Earwig, 1983)
