= Heritage Records =

Heritage Records may refer to:

- Heritage Records (United States), a 1960s record label from Jerry Ross Productions
- Heritage Records (England), 1960s Blues and early Jazz label founded by Tony Standish
- BMG Heritage Records, BMG Strategic Marketing Group reissue division of Sony BMG Music Entertainment

== See also ==
- List of record labels
