= Phil Ranstrom =

American documentary film maker

- Occupation: Documentary film maker
- Website: MaxwellStreetDocumentary.com

Phil Ranstrom is an American documentary film maker.

== Career ==
From 1994 to 2006 Ranstrom worked as the producer of the documentary Cheat You Fair: The Story of Maxwell Street. During that time he interviewed a variety of blues musicians such as Buddy Guy, Bo Diddley and Johnny Williams. Ranstrom tells the story of the displacement of the neighborhood's residents in favor of condos and commercial establishments and the subsequent effect on blues culture. The film won a nomination at the 2012 Chicago / Midwest Emmy Awards for Outstanding Crafts Achievement Off-Air: Writer – Program On (non news) category.
