= Jesse Thomas (musician) =

American blues guitarist and singer (1911–1995)

Jesse "Babyface" Thomas (February 3, 1911 – August 13, 1995) was an American Louisiana blues guitarist and singer. Known at different times as "Baby Face" or "Mule", and occasionally billed as "The Blues Troubadour", his career performing blues music extended eight decades.

== Career ==
Born in Logansport, Louisiana, United States, Thomas is best known for the song "Blue Goose Blues", which he recorded for Victor in 1929. He recorded and performed throughout the 1940s and 1950s, based in the Los Angeles area. He recorded for Specialty Records in 1953. While in Los Angeles he operated his own Club record label. Thomas returned to Shreveport in the late 1950s and in the mid-1960s made recordings on his Red River label.

His career spanned over 60 years – in 1994 he appeared at the Long Beach Blues Festival. The Louisiana bluesman, Ramblin' Thomas, was his brother, and fellow Louisiana blues guitar player, Lafayette Thomas, was his nephew.

A longtime resident of the Lakeside neighborhood of Shreveport, Louisiana, Thomas died there on August 15, 1995 at the age of 84.

== Discography ==
- 1996: Lookin' for That Woman (Black Top – BT 1128)
- 2001: Blues Is a Feeling (Delmark)
