= 7th District Police Station =

- U.S. National Register of Historic Places
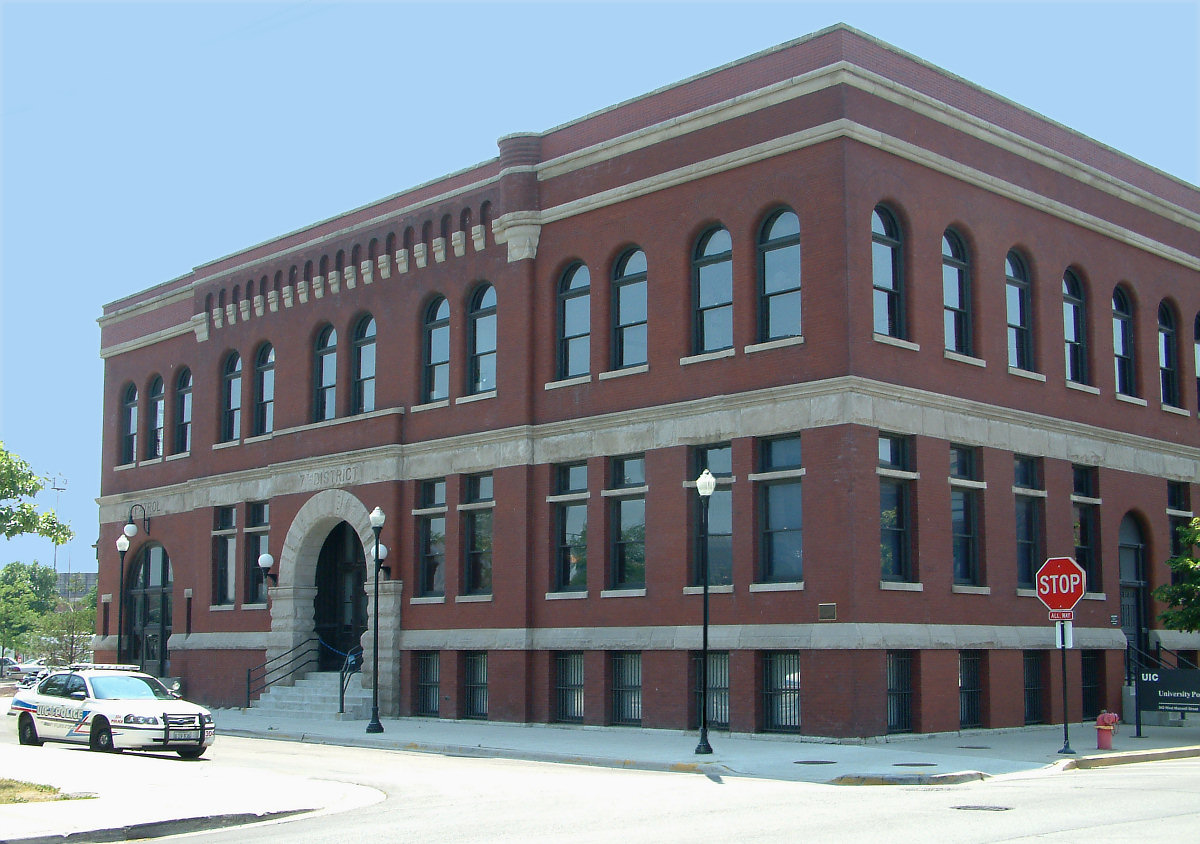

- Location within Chicago metropolitan area
- Location: 949 W. Maxwell Street Chicago, Illinois 60608
- Coordinates: 41°51′52″N 87°39′2″W
- Built: 1888; 138 years ago
- Architect: Edbrooke, Willoughby James; Burnham, Franklin Pierce
- Architectural style: Romanesque
- NRHP reference No.: 96000515
- Added to NRHP: May 2, 1996

The 7th District Police Station, or Maxwell Street Station in Chicago, was built in 1888 in response to the need for increased police presence in "Bloody Maxwell", known colloquially as "the Wickedest Police District in the World." The neighborhood, a changing melting pot of Irish, German, Italian and European Jewish immigrants, grew exponentially in the years following the Chicago Fire of 1871. The housing and sanitation situation in the district was substandard, and the residents poor. Criminal activity flourished.

The Romanesque style station is architecturally significant as an example of pre-1945 police stations in Chicago. It was designed by Willoughby J. Edbrooke and Franklin Pierce Burnham. It was added to the National Register of Historic Places in 1996.

== History ==
The Chicago Police Department vacated the station in 1998. After extensive renovation, the red brick and limestone building became the home of the University of Illinois at Chicago Police Department. The renovations were done in a manner designed to uphold the historic significance of the building's architecture. "The building's original windows were sent to a company in Kankakee for restoration, the masonry cleaned and repaired, the roof replaced, and parapets at the top of the station rebuilt using custom-made bricks, the exact texture and color of the originals." In order to be handicap-accessible, the renovations included constructing a new street-level main entrance where the vehicle entrance had been, to the east of the original front doors and their six steps.

The building is known in popular culture because the outside was used as the picture of the precinct house in the opening and closing credits, and establishing shots of the iconic television series, Hill Street Blues. It is also used as the exterior of the precinct house in the television series Chicago P.D., and the television series Sense8.
