= Maxwell Street Klezmer Band =

Chicago-based Jewish Folk Music Band

- Origin: Skokie, Illinois
- Genre: Klezmer
- Years active: 1983–present
- Members: 26 Active Members
- Website: Official website

The Maxwell Street Klezmer Band is a Chicago-based klezmer ensemble. It was founded by Lori Lippitz in 1983 and is directed by violinist Alex Koffman. The band's educational and outreach focus led to the establishment of the Klezmer Music Foundation, which continues to support Maxwell Street Klezmer Band among other professional and amateur groups. Maxwell Street Klezmer Band has performed and toured across the United States, United Kingdom and Europe. Notable performances have also included those at Carnegie Hall and alongside the Lyric Opera of Chicago in 2014. In addition to performing on stage, Maxwell Street Klezmer Band also plays for weddings, bar/bat mitzvah ceremonies, Jewish community celebrations, and other events.

The band is well-known for performing in the classic European Jewish klezmer style blended with a big band sound. Many of the band's members are themselves immigrants from Eastern Europe, including countries like the former Soviet Union, Poland and Czechia.

The Maxwell Street Klezmer Band, along with its sister music groups in the Klezmer Music Foundation, use community outreach and education to promote the preservation of the klezmer musical heritage.

== History ==
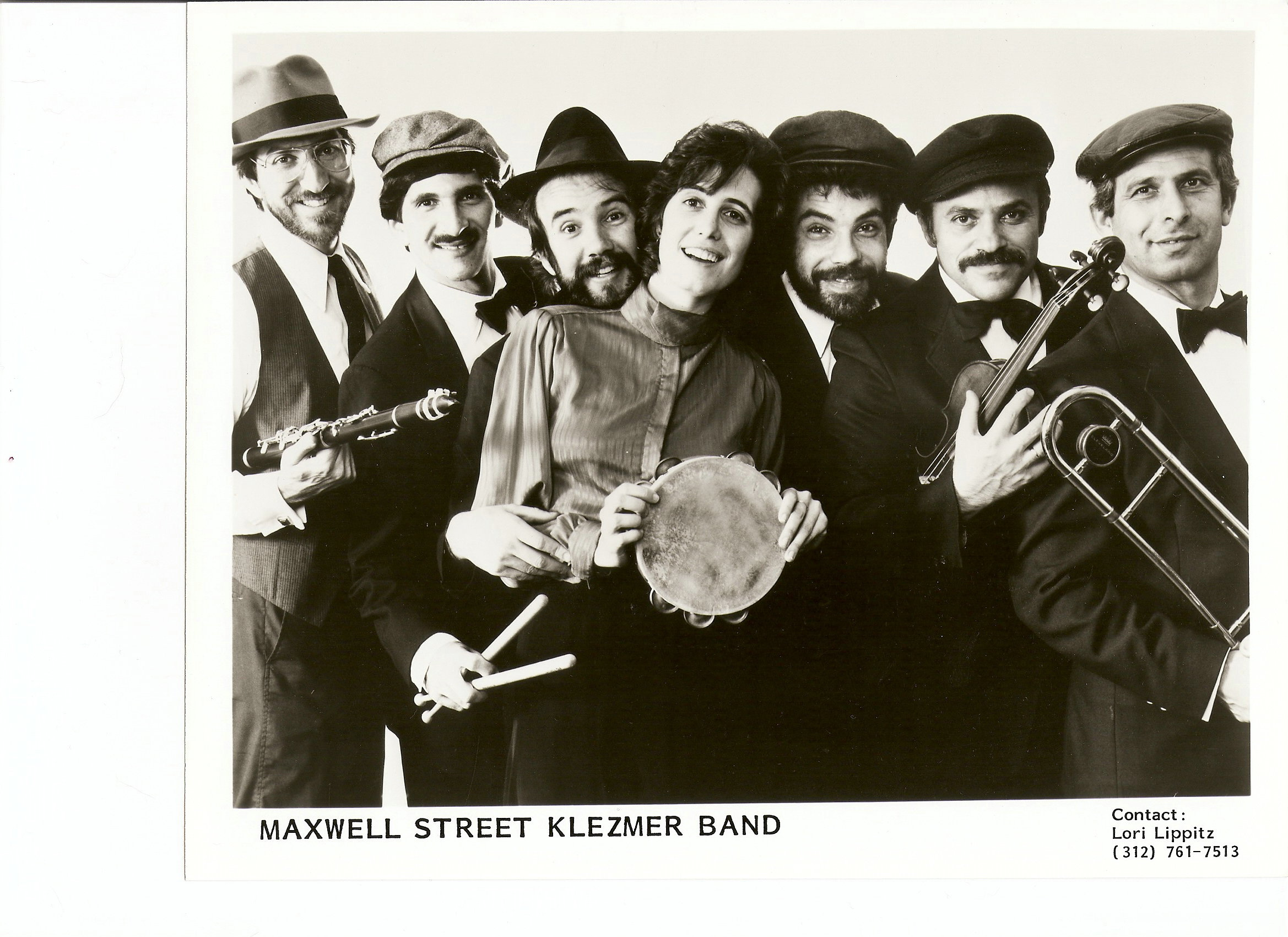
The Maxwell Street Klezmer Band in 1987

For information about the history of the klezmer music genre, see this page on klezmer music.

The Maxwell Street Klezmer Band was founded by Lori Lippitz in 1983. The name "Maxwell Street" derives from the neighborhood of the same name on the west side of Chicago, which was culturally important due to the Sunday Market. In the late 19th and early 20th centuries, many of the merchants and pushcart peddlers who settled in Maxwell Street were Jewish immigrants from Eastern Europe.

In 1994, Lippitz founded the Klezmer Music Foundation, a nonprofit organization which includes the Maxwell Street Klezmer Band.

The band toured Europe multiple times. In 1998, the band performed in London, Vienna, and Munich among other locations. The same year, Maxwell Street performed at Carnegie Hall in New York City.

In 2014, the Maxwell Street Klezmer Band, together with the Chicago Sinfonietta, performed the world premier of Ilya Levinson's Klezmer Rhapsody, with violinist Alex Koffman as the soloist. The same year, the band also performed as the ensemble for the klezmer opera The Property with the Lyric Opera of Chicago.

== Style ==
The Maxwell Street Klezmer Band primarily plays klezmer music in a manner that has been described as high-energy, soulful, and horn driven.

They perform dance music in a multitude of styles. They perform a blend of classical Eastern European klezmer music with a big band jazz style.

== Albums ==
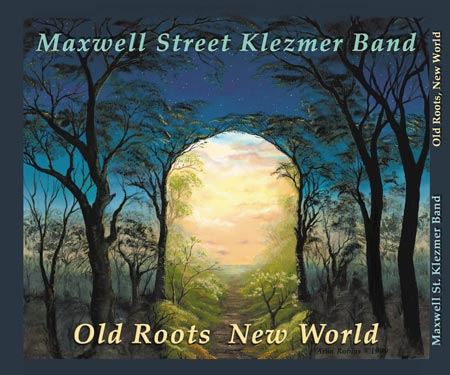
Album art for the Klezmer Band

The Maxwell Street Klezmer Band release their music under the Shanachie Records label.

- Maxwell Street Days (1986 & 2013)
- Maxwell Street Wedding (aka Sweet Early Years) (1991 & 2013)
- You Should Be So Lucky! (1996)
- Old Roots New World (2002)
- Eight Nights of Joy (2008)
- Arik Luck is... Moyshe Oysher (2010)

== Publications ==
The band released The Joy of Klez Band Books, a three book collection of Klezmer band scores published by Tara Books. The book features arrangements of traditional Klezmer songs from 1910 to 1940.

== Band members ==
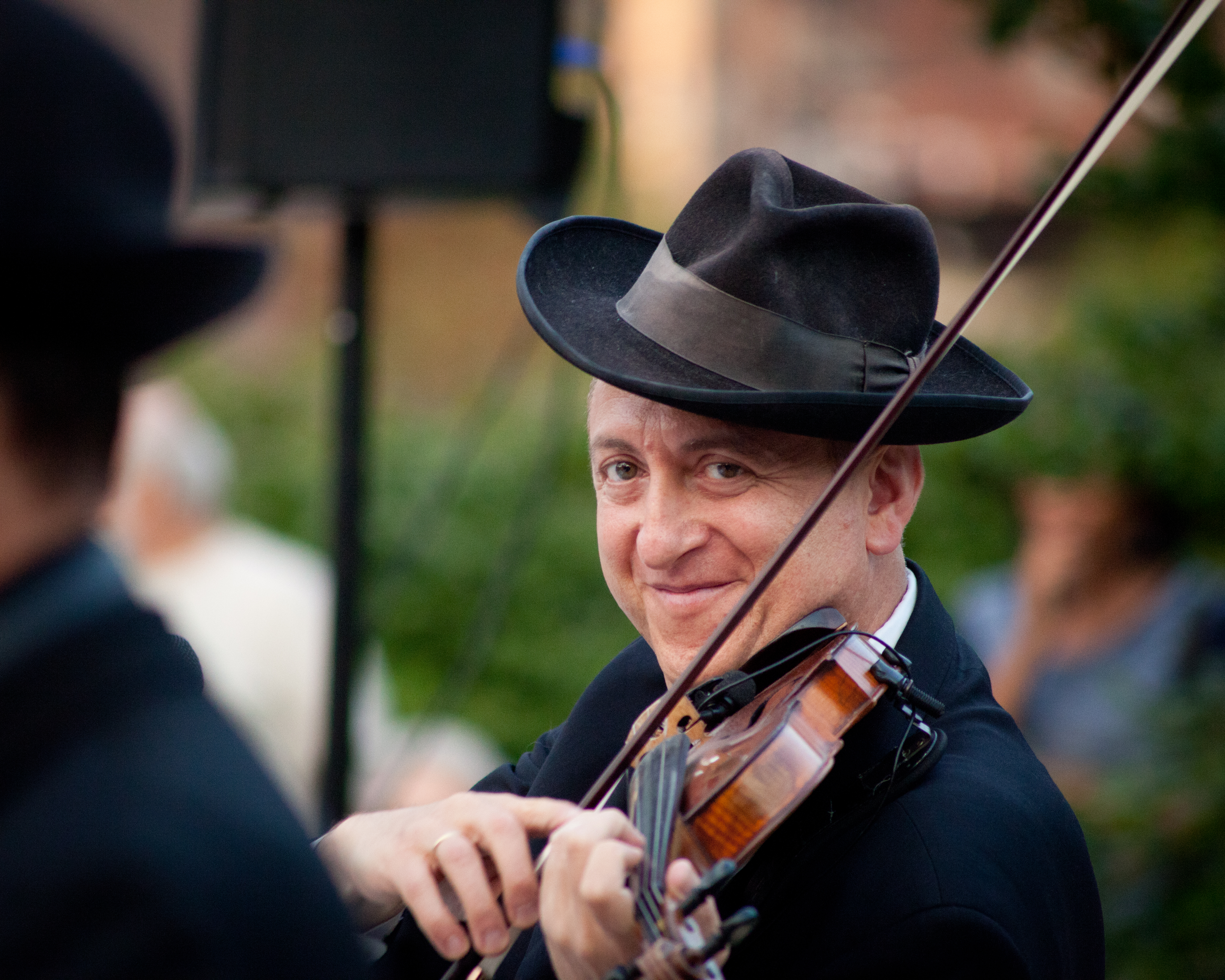
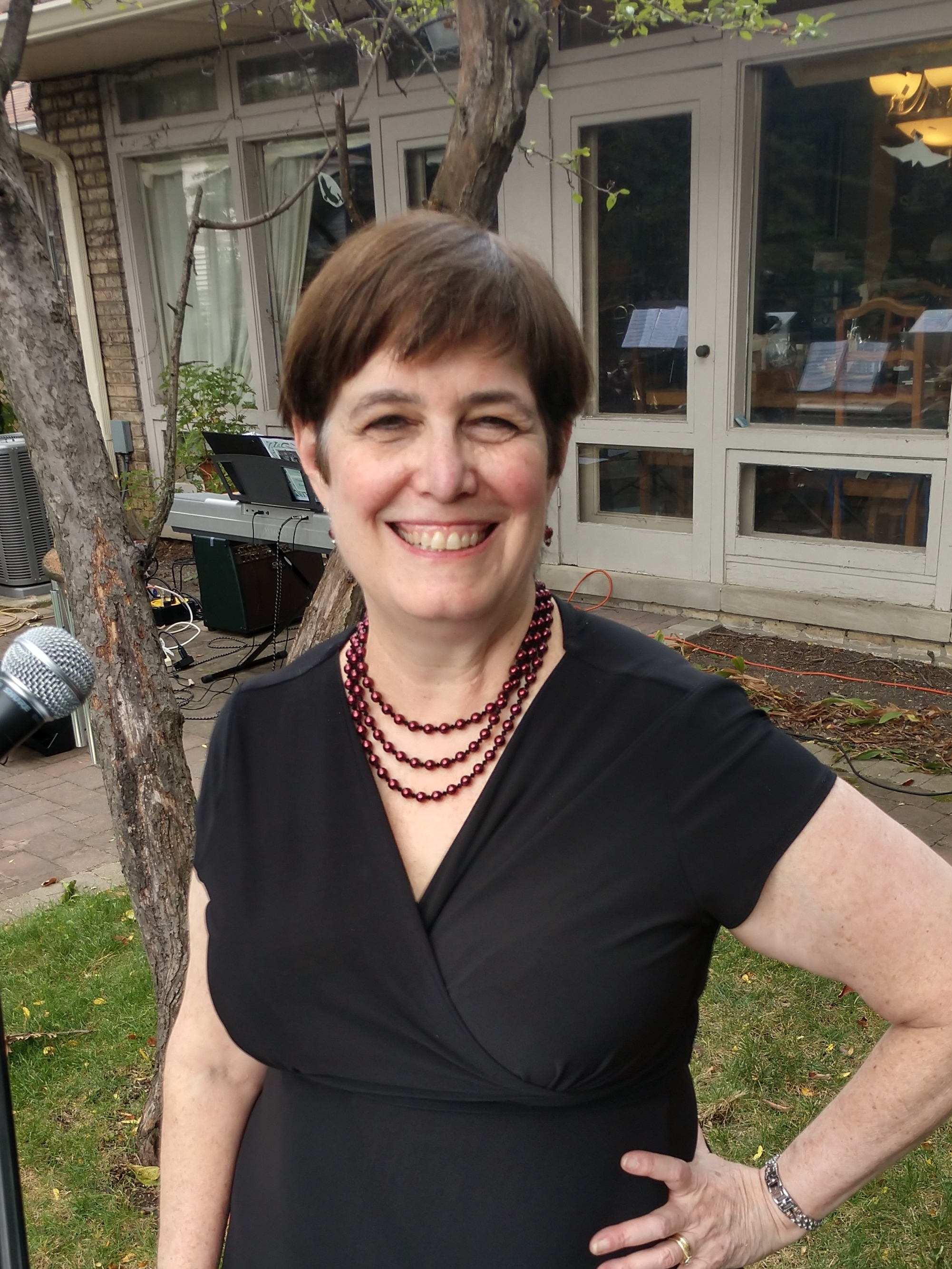
Alex Koffman (top) and Lori Lippitz (bottom)

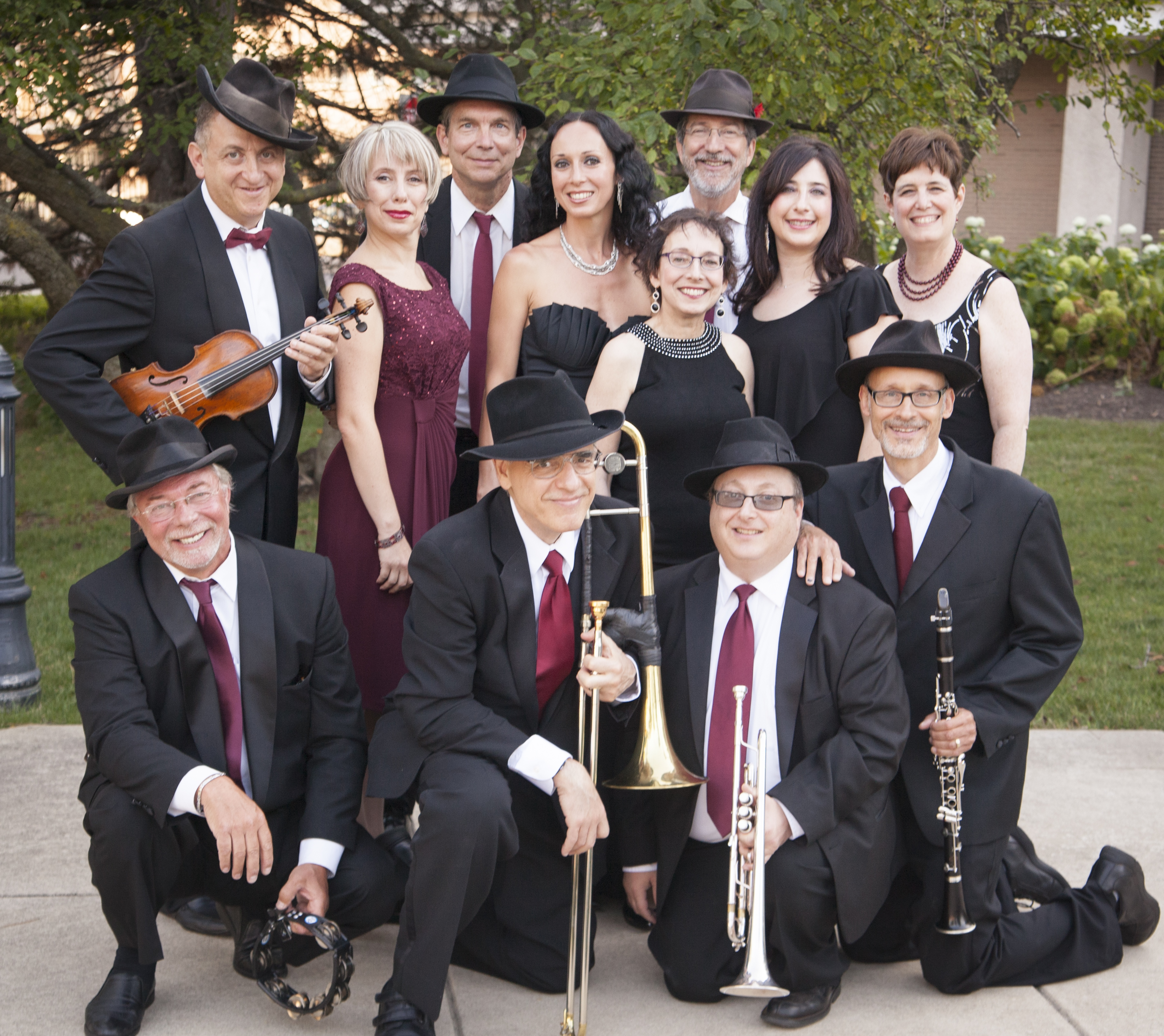
Band group photo in Skokie, 2015

=== Band leadership ===
- Alex Koffman: band director, violinist, and composer. He joined the band in 1990. Koffman creates arrangements for the band and serves as musical director.
- Lori Lippitz: band's founder, manager, guitarist, and one of the vocalists. She also manages the Junior Klezmer Orchestra and the Salaam-Shalom project.
- Shelley Yoelin: saxophone, clarinet, flute, composer

=== Current band members ===
- Vocalists: Lori Lippitz, Lisa Fishman, Cantor Pavel Roytman, Bibi Marcell, Tanya Melamed, Natasha Bodansky, Charlene Brooks
- Violin: Alex Koffman, Irina Kaufman
- Clarinet: Shelley Yoelin, Donald Jacobs, Jeff Jeziorski, Bartek (Bartosz) Warkoczynski
- Trumpet: Ivo Braun
- Trombone: Robert Samborski, Dana Legg, Audrey Morrison
- Piano: Gail Mangurten, Lawrence Eckerling
- Bass/Tuba: Jim Cox, Rich Armandi, Howard Prager
- Drums: Steve Hawk, Justin Kramer
- Accordion: Peter Sadkhin, Sam Hyson

== Awards ==
=== The Award for Artistic Excellence ===
Awarded by the Skokie Fine Arts Commission in 2016, this award honors Skokie artists for community visibility, artistic talents, number of people reached, regional recognition, and demonstration of artistic excellence.

=== 2020 Skokie Community Foundation Grant Award ===
Awarded in 2019, the Skokie Community Foundation donated funds to support an interfaith initiative between the Klezmer Music Foundation and the MCC Academy. Jewish and Muslim students attended educational events and held a concert featuring music of their cultures.

== Klezmer Music Foundation ==
The Klezmer Music Foundation is an outreach organization that includes the Maxwell Street Klezmer band as one of its affiliated groups. The Foundation's mission is to preserve and maintain the Jewish tradition of klezmer music through performance, education and collaboration.

Other musical groups associated with the Klezmer Music Foundation are the Junior Klezmer Orchestra and the Chicago Salaam-Shalom Music Project, as well as several synagogue klezmer bands.

The Junior Klezmer Orchestra was founded in 1994, and teaches teenage musicians the klezmer music style and tradition for performances at various local venues, including music festivals. Junior Klezmer Orchestra was featured on WFMT Radio in Introductions, a program about talented pre-college musicians.

The Salaam-Shalom Music Project includes both Jewish klezmer musicians as well as Christian, Muslim, and Arab musicians from countries including Egypt, Pakistan and Iraq. The group comprises members of different ethnic and religious backgrounds sharing and performing folk music in various styles.

The Foundation also organizes performances, collaborations on theatrical and musical presentations, and educational programs at nursing homes, schools, and synagogues.

== See also ==
- Maxwell Street
- Jewish music
- Jewish culture
