= Logansport, Louisiana =

- Town
- Town of Logansport
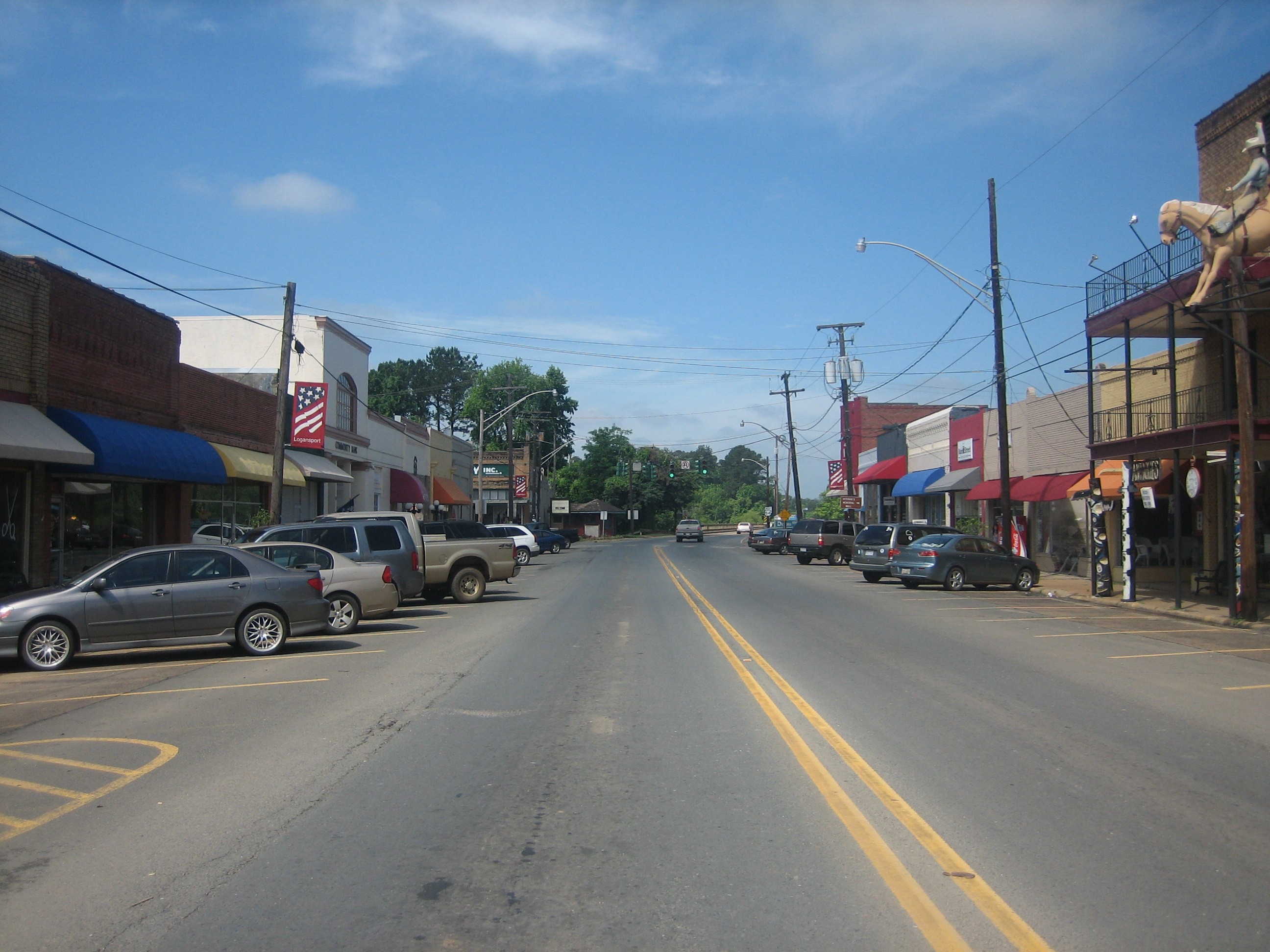
- Downtown Logansport

- Location of Logansport in De Soto Parish, Louisiana.

- Location of Louisiana in the United States
- Coordinates: 31°58′49″N 93°59′56″W
- Country: United States
- State: Louisiana
- Parish: DeSoto

Area
  - Total: 3.49 sq mi (9.05 km^{2})
  - Land: 3.40 sq mi (8.80 km^{2})
  - Water: 0.10 sq mi (0.26 km^{2})
- Elevation: 220 ft (67 m)

Population (2020)
  - Total: 1,340
  - Density: 394.6/sq mi (152.34/km^{2})
- Time zone: UTC-6 (CST)
  - Summer (DST): UTC-5 (CDT)
- Zip Code: 71049
- Area code: 318
- FIPS code: 22-45040
- GNIS feature ID: 2406038
- Website: www.townoflogansport.com

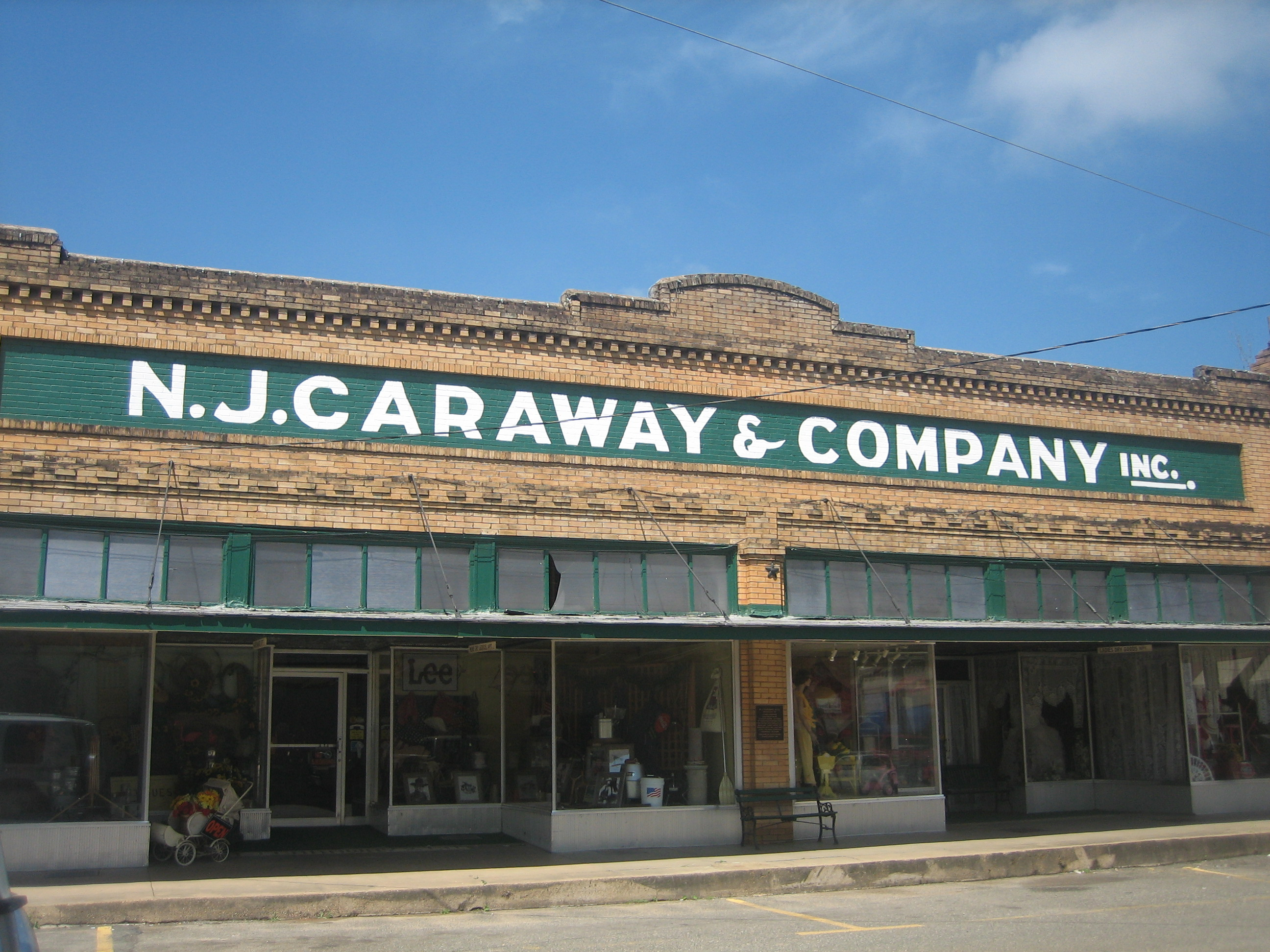
N.J. Caraway Department Store in Logansport dates to 1907.

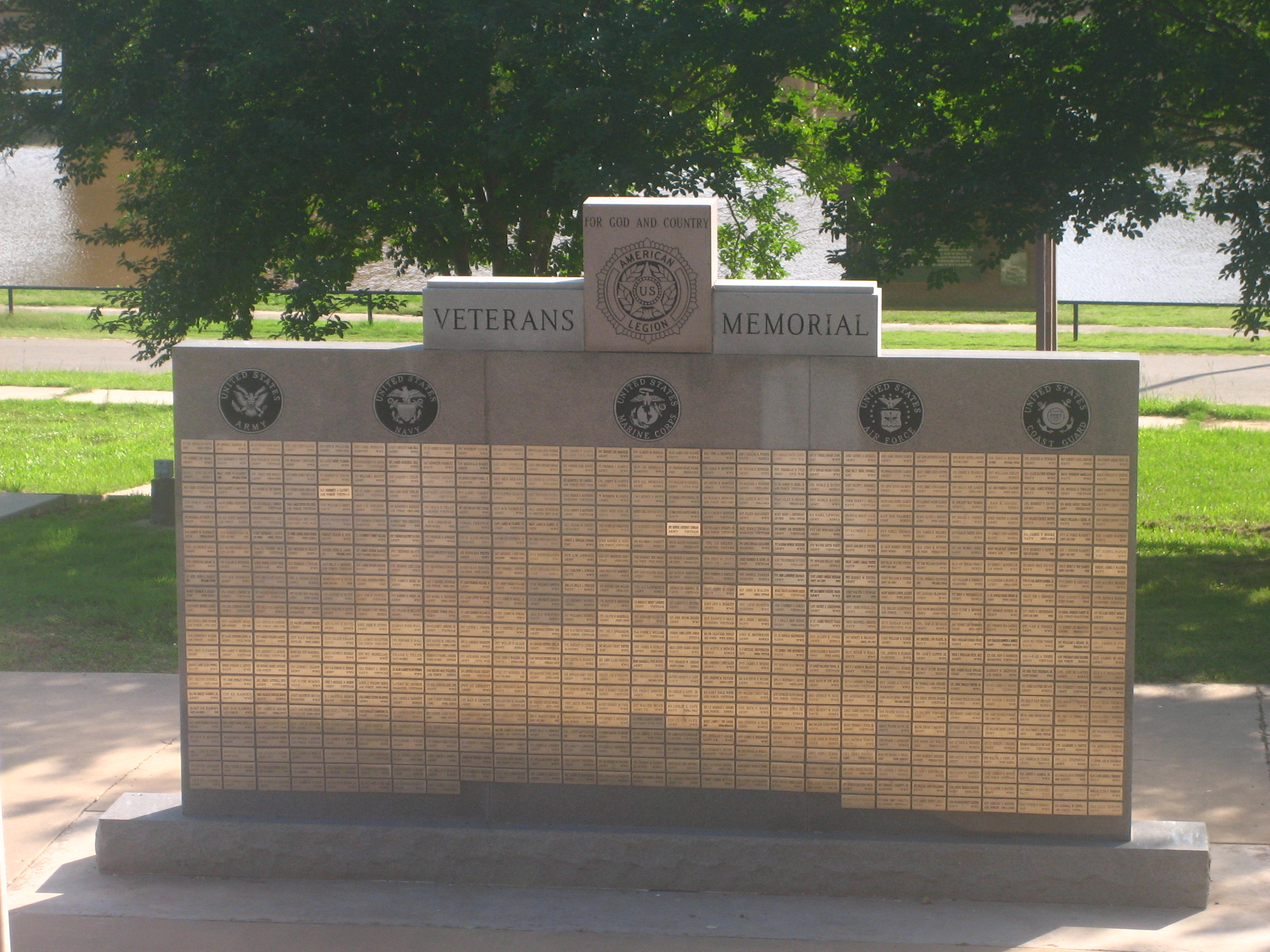
The Veterans Memorial in Logansport

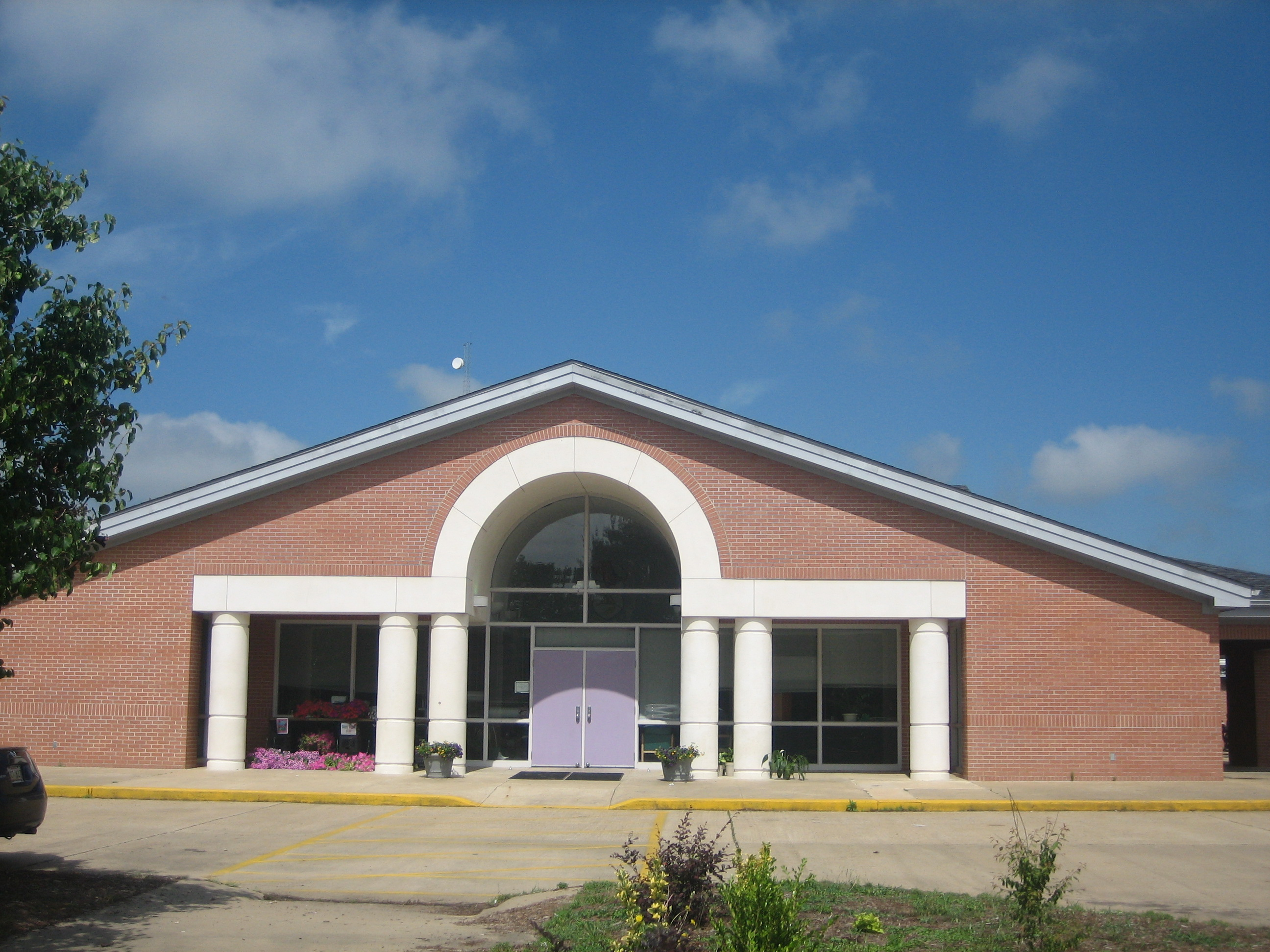
Logansport High School off Louisiana State Highway 5

Logansport is a town in western DeSoto Parish adjacent to the Sabine River in western Louisiana, United States. The population was 1,340 in 2020. It is part of the Shreveport–Bossier City metropolitan statistical area.

== History ==
The area, long a disputed boundary even after the Louisiana Purchase, was part of a neutral territory negotiated by Gen. James Wilkinson and Lt. Col. Simón de Herrera on November 6, 1806.

The Adams–Onís Treaty of 1819, that was not ratified until 1821, would have been a solution but in 1821 Mexico's independence reignited the dispute. Dr. Logan moved to the area in 1830 began practicing medicine in Louisiana and Texas. He chartered a ferry business in the area and it became known as Logan's Ferry.

Texas won independence in 1836, and the newly formed Republic of Texas agreed to the Adams–Onís Treaty, so the Sabine River became the international boundary. The survey crew began the demarcation process on May 20, 1840, at the Gulf of Mexico, and work was completed in 1841. Boundary markers were placed along the boundary, that included one in Logansport. This marker apparently is the only one surviving, meaning it is the only known international boundary marker in the United States. The Texas Annexation of 1845, ended nine years of the Sabine River international boundary.

The name Logansport was given to the town when a post office was established February 28, 1848. There were few people living in the town prior to the arrival of the railroad. With the arrival of the railroad, there was an influx of gamblers and others of questionable character, along with the citizens of better repute. At one time Logansport had more saloons than grocery stores. The town began to grow and it was incorporated. The first election was held on June 25, 1887. In this election there were only 15 qualified voters listed. Elijah Price was elected mayor, along with five other trustees. Oil and gas were also a very important source of income for the early citizens of Logansport.

== Geography ==
According to the United States Census Bureau, the town has a total area of 3.4 square miles (8.8 km^{2}), of which 3.2 square miles (8.3 km^{2}) is land and 0.2 square miles (0.52 km^{2}) (4.45%) is water.

The Logansport riverfront is an entrance off U.S. Highway 84 into Louisiana from Texas. It has a terraced landscape, veterans memorial, walking paths, gazebo, picnic tables, and a pavilion.

== Demographics ==
Historical population
Census	Pop.	Note	%±
1890	281		—
1900	688		144.8%
1910	420		−39.0%
1920	632		50.5%
1930	1,040		64.6%
1940	1,222		17.5%
1950	1,270		3.9%
1960	1,371		8.0%
1970	1,330		−3.0%
1980	1,565		17.7%
1990	1,390		−11.2%
2000	1,630		17.3%
2010	1,555		−4.6%
2020	1,340		−13.8%
2025 (est.)	1,325	▼	−1.1%
U.S. Decennial Census

Logansport racial composition as of 2020
Race	Number	Percentage
White (non-Hispanic)	708	52.84%
Black or African American (non-Hispanic)	536	40.0%
Native American	5	0.37%
Asian	1	0.07%
Other/Mixed	63	4.7%
Hispanic or Latino	27	2.01%

As of the 2020 United States census, there were 1,340 people, 684 households, and 481 families residing in the town.

== Media ==
=== Newspaper ===
The Toledo Bend Tribune, a local newspaper for Logansport closed in 2007. There is currently no local newspaper for the town. There is however a quarterly and popular (online and printed) magazine titled DeSoto Life, that covers all of DeSoto Parish. Desoto Life is owned and operated by Armstrong Enterprises USA, LLC who also owns iTOUR USA™, and Armstrong Productions.

The Light and Champion, a weekly newspaper across the river in Center, Texas, began distributing a free distribution product called The Merchandiser in March 2017, to stands at several locations in Logansport. The paper's Web site, www.lightandchampion.com, also has a dedicated menu tab for Logansport. The publications are owned by Moser Community Media out of Brenham, Texas.

Name	Serve
Town of Logansport newspaper	Town of Logansport

== Notable people ==
- Larry Bagley, Republican member of the Louisiana House of Representatives
- John Spencer Hardy, lieutenant general during World War II
- Bryan Martin, country music singer
- Elzadie Robinson, classic female blues singer
- Louis "Moses" Rose, a French Soldier said to be the only man who deserted the defenders of the Alamo
- Country blues musician Ramblin' Thomas was born in Logansport.
- Blues musician Jesse Thomas was also born in Logansport.
