= Ramblin' Thomas =

American blues singer, guitarist and songwriter (1901/2–1944/5)

- Born: Willard Thomas; 1901 or 1902; Logansport, Louisiana, United States
- Died: 1944 or 1945 (aged 41–44) Memphis, Tennessee, United States
- Genres: Texas blues; Country blues
- Occupations: Singer-songwriter; Musician
- Instruments: Vocals; Guitar
- Labels: Paramount, Victor

Willard "Ramblin'" Thomas (1901 or 1902 – 1944 or 1945) was an American country blues singer, guitarist and songwriter. He is best remembered for his slide guitar playing and for several recordings he made in the late 1920s and early 1930s. Blues scholars seem undecided if his nickname referred to his style of playing or to his itinerant nature. He was the brother of the blues musician Jesse Thomas.

== Biography ==
Thomas was born in Logansport, Louisiana, one of nine children in his family. His father played the fiddle, and Willard and his brothers Joe L. and Jesse learned to play the guitar, with Willard particularly practicing slide guitar techniques.

Thomas relocated to Deep Ellum, Dallas, Texas, in the late 1920s and was influenced by the playing of Lonnie Johnson, Blind Lemon Jefferson and Blind Blake. He performed in San Antonio, Oklahoma and possibly St. Louis, Missouri, in his subsequent travels. He recorded in Dallas and Chicago between 1928 and 1932, for Paramount Records and Victor Records. His playing is said to have influenced Black Ace and Robert Johnson.

Thomas reportedly died of tuberculosis in 1944 or 1945 in Memphis, Tennessee.

Compilations of his work have been released on CD by various record companies, including Document Records, in addition to LPs previously issued by Heritage, Biograph, and Matchbox Records.

== Discography ==
- Ramblin' Mind Blues: Chicago Blues, 1928
- Complete Recorded Works 1928–1932 in Chronological Order, Ramblin' Thomas and the Dallas Blues Singers, compilation album (Document, 1992)

His known recorded songs are the following:

- "So Lonesome"
- "Hard to Rule Woman Blues"
- "Lock and Key Blues"
- "Sawmill Moan"
- "No Baby Blues"

- "Ramblin' Mind Blues"
- "No Job Blues"
- "Back Gnawing Blues"
- "Jig Head Blues"

- "Hard Dallas Blues" (take 2)
- "Hard Dallas Blues" (take 4)
- "Ramblin' Man"
- "Poor Boy Blues"
- "Good Time Blues"

- "New Way of Living Blues"
- "Ground Hog Blues"
- "Shake It Gal"
- "Ground Hog Blues No. 2"
- "Little Old Mama Blues"

== See also ==
- List of country blues musicians
- List of Texas blues musicians
