= John Spencer Hardy =

United States Air Force general

John Spencer Hardy, Sr.
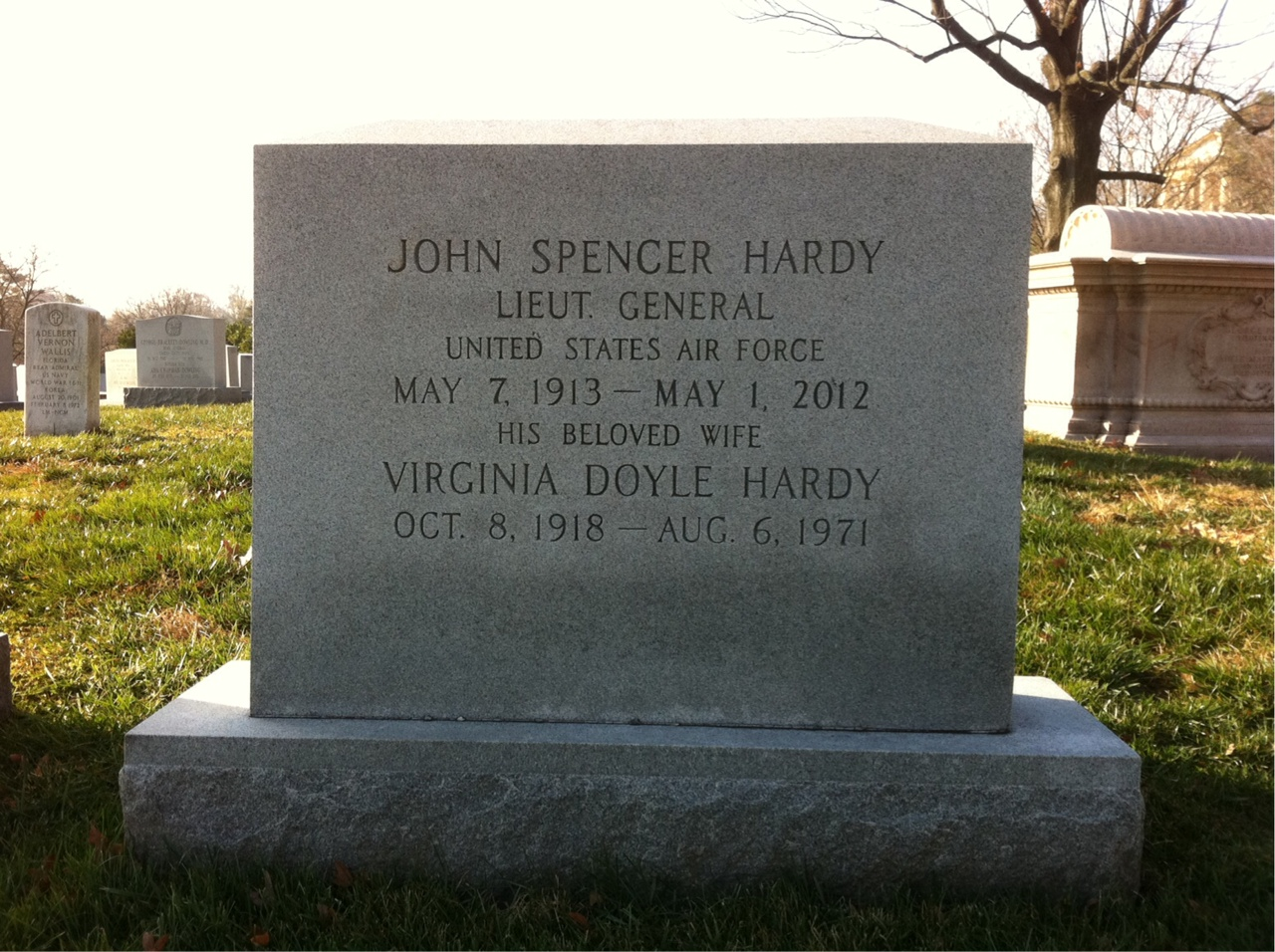
- Grave at Arlington National Cemetery
- Born: May 7, 1913; Logansport, DeSoto Parish, Louisiana
- Died: May 1, 2012 (aged 98); Baton Rouge, Louisiana
- Resting place: Arlington National Cemetery
- Education: Centenary College of Louisiana
- Occupation: Chief of Operations of United States Army Air Corps in the Mediterranean Sea in World War II Lieutenant General of the United States Air Force
- Spouse: (1) Virginia Elizabeth Doyle (2) Jean Talbot Hopkins (3) Norma Ann Hendrick (married 1993-2012, his death)
- Children: Beth Courtney John S. Hardy, Jr. George Dickson Hardy

John Spencer Hardy, Sr. (May 7, 1913 – May 1, 2012), was a lieutenant general who served as chief of operations for the United States Army Air Corps in the Mediterranean Sea during World War II.

== Background ==
Hardy was born in Logansport in DeSoto Parish in western Louisiana. In 1930, he graduated from Logansport High School and then attended Baylor University in Waco, Texas, and Louisiana Tech University in Ruston. In 1938, he obtained a Bachelor of Arts degree from Methodist-affiliated Centenary College in Shreveport, Louisiana. In February 1935, Hardy entered aviation cadet training at Randolph Field in San Antonio. In 1936, he received his pilot wings thereafter at the since closed Kelly Field, also in San Antonio. After serving on active duty for a year as a flying cadet with the 17th and 3rd Attack Groups, he was commissioned a second lieutenant effective March 1, 1937.

== World War II service ==
His first commissioned assignment was at Barksdale Field in Bossier City, Louisiana, where he assumed squadron and, later, group operational duties. Designated as assistant chief of operations early in 1942, he helped to activate the Eighth Air Force headquarters at Savannah, Georgia, and at Bolling Field in Washington, D.C. In the summer of 1942, Hardy was assigned to England with the Eighth Air Force and became chief of operations in 1943. For his work during this period, he received the Distinguished Service Medal. His duties took him to the Mediterranean in 1944, at which time he participated in the planning for air offensives against southern Europe, the Balkans, and the Allied landings in southern France.

== Cold War service ==
During the Cold War, Hardy was deputy chief for the United States Air Force's Pacific Air Command, for the Pacific unified command, commander of the Third Air Force in England, and the commander of the North Atlantic Treaty Organization's Allied Air Forces based in Naples, Italy. He subsequently served as Commandant of the Industrial College of the Armed Forces at Fort Lesley J. McNair in Washington, D.C. He received the Army and Air Force Distinguished Service Medals, Legion of Merit with two Oak Leaf Clusters, Belgian Croix de Guerre with Palm, and the Royal Hellenic Order of King George I.

Hardy was involved in negotiations relating to the Taiwan Straits Crisis in 1958 and the renegotiation of the defense treaty with Japan in 1959. His assignments took him to many locations, including Hickam Air Force Base in Hawaii and from 1960 to 1964 as the commander of Keesler Technical Training Center in Biloxi, Mississippi.

== Retirement years ==
Upon his military retirement effective August 1, 1970, Hardy resided in Shreveport, where he served on the Centenary College board and was inducted into the institution's Hall of Fame. He was a member of the board of the United States Air Force Academy in Colorado Springs, the advisory board of the Louisiana Old State Capitol and the Louisiana State University Health Sciences Center Shreveport. He was honored as a "Louisiana Legend" in 2008 by Louisiana Public Broadcasting.

Hardy's first wife was the former Virginia Elizabeth Doyle, whom he married in her native Shreveport in 1940. Their children are Beth Courtney of Baton Rouge, the long-time president of Louisiana Public Broadcasting, and her husband, Robert "Bob" Courtney; John S. Hardy, Jr., of Baton Rouge, and his wife, Karen, and George Dickson Hardy of San Diego, California. After Virginia's death, General Hardy married Jean Talbot Hopkins. His third wife, whom he married in 1993, is the former Norma Ann Hendrick of Shreveport, who survived him. He had three grandchildren, Julia George Moore, Robin Virginia Hardy Moreland and Spencer Miles George Hardy, two great-grandchildren, and six step-children, James Hopkins, Janie Hopkins, Susan Meyers, Talbot Trudeau, Dr. Robert Hendrick, and Virginia Haddad.

Hardy died in Baton Rouge, less than a week from what would have been his 99th birthday. Services were held in the Frost Chapel of First Baptist Church of Shreveport, where he was a long-time member. Interment with full military honors was at Arlington National Cemetery in Arlington, Virginia.
