= Philip Maxwell =

American politician

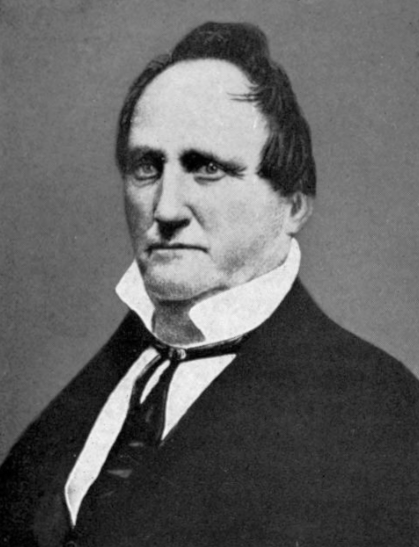

Member of the New York State Assembly
- In office 1832

Personal details
- Born: April 3, 1799 Guilford, Vermont
- Died: November 5, 1859 (aged 60) Lake Geneva, Wisconsin
- Occupation: Physician, politician

Philip Maxwell (April 3, 1799 - November 5, 1859) was an American medical doctor and politician.

== Life ==
Philip Maxwell was born in Guilford, Vermont on April 3, 1799. Maxwell moved to Sackett's Harbor, New York, where he became a medical doctor. He was a member of the New York State Assembly (Jefferson Co.) in 1832. He became a medical doctor for the United States Army and was assigned to Fort Dearborn, Chicago, Illinois as an assistant surgeon, until it was abandoned in 1836. He was promoted to full surgeon in 1838 and served with General Zachary Taylor. He decided to make his home in Chicago after resigning from the service. From 1844 to 1847, he ran a doctors office at the corner of Lake and Clark Streets. The next year, he formed a partnership with Brock McVickar. Maxwell went on to become a state representative from 1849 to 1852.

Known for his jolly demeanor, the corpulent doctor died in Lake Geneva, Wisconsin on November 5, 1859. Chicago's famous Maxwell Street is named for him.
