= Maxwell Street =

Human settlement in Chicago, Illinois, United States of America

Coordinates: 41°51′52″N 87°38′49″W

- Dr. Philip Maxwell Street; 1330 South
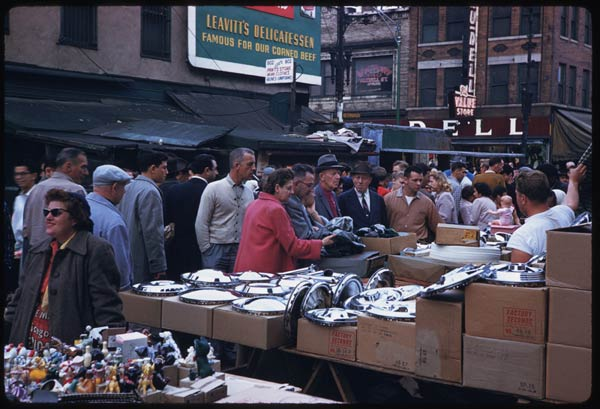
- Sunday on Maxwell St. circa 1958 (Charles W. Cushman)
- Interactive map of Maxwell Street
- Location: Chicago
- West end: Blue Island Avenue in Chicago
- East end: Clinton Street in Chicago

Other
- Known for: Philip Maxwell

Maxwell Street is an east–west street in Chicago, Illinois, that intersects with Halsted Street just south of Roosevelt Road. It runs at 1330 South in the numbering system running from 500 West to 1126 West. The Maxwell Street neighborhood is considered part of the Near West Side and is one of the city's oldest residential districts. It is the location of the celebrated Maxwell Street Market (sometimes known as "Jew Town") and the birthplace of Chicago blues and the "Maxwell Street Polish", a sausage sandwich. A large portion of the area is part of the campus of the University of Illinois at Chicago and a private housing development sponsored by the university.

== History ==
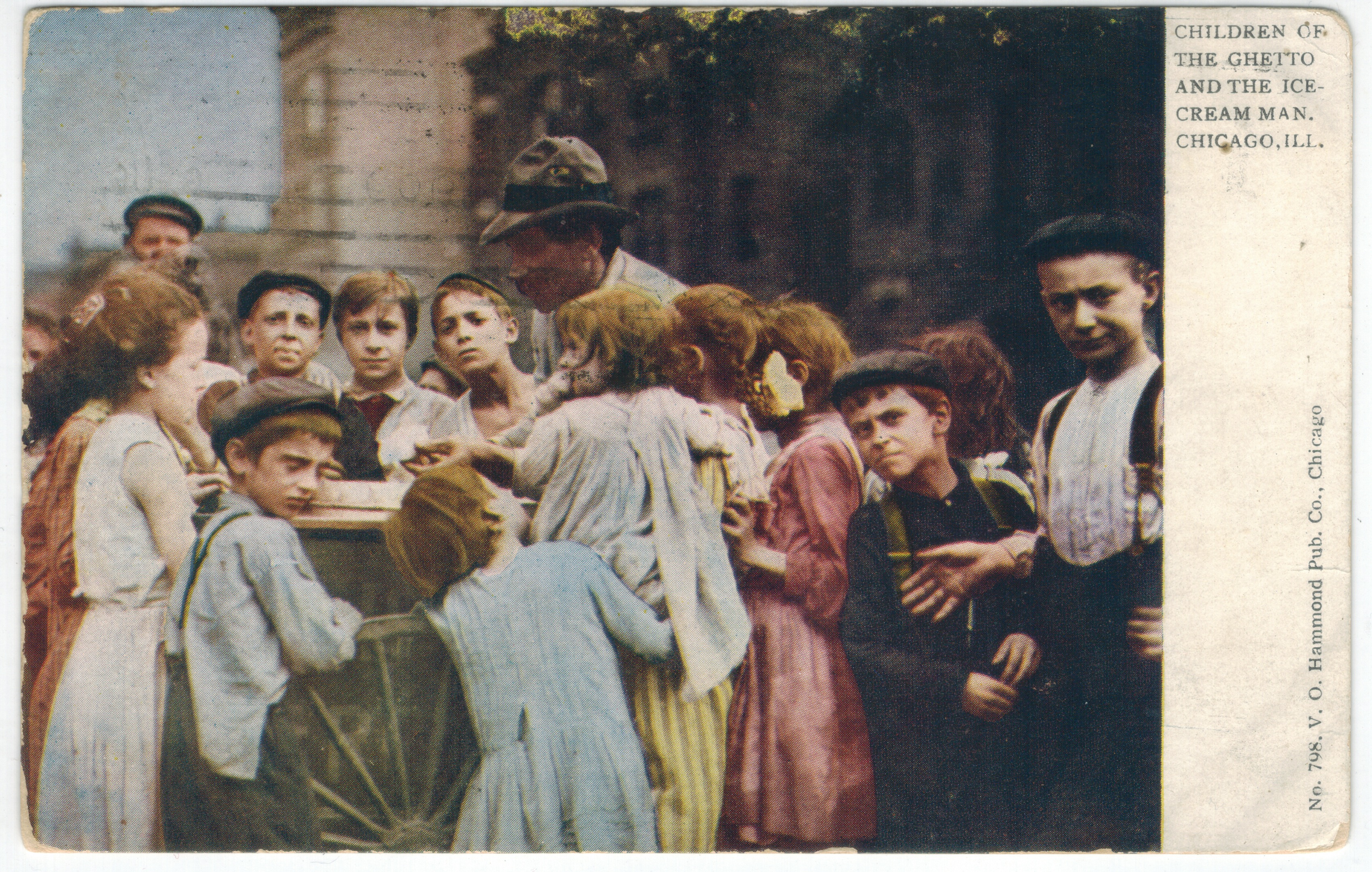
'Children in the Ghetto and the Ice-Cream Man' postcard circa 1909

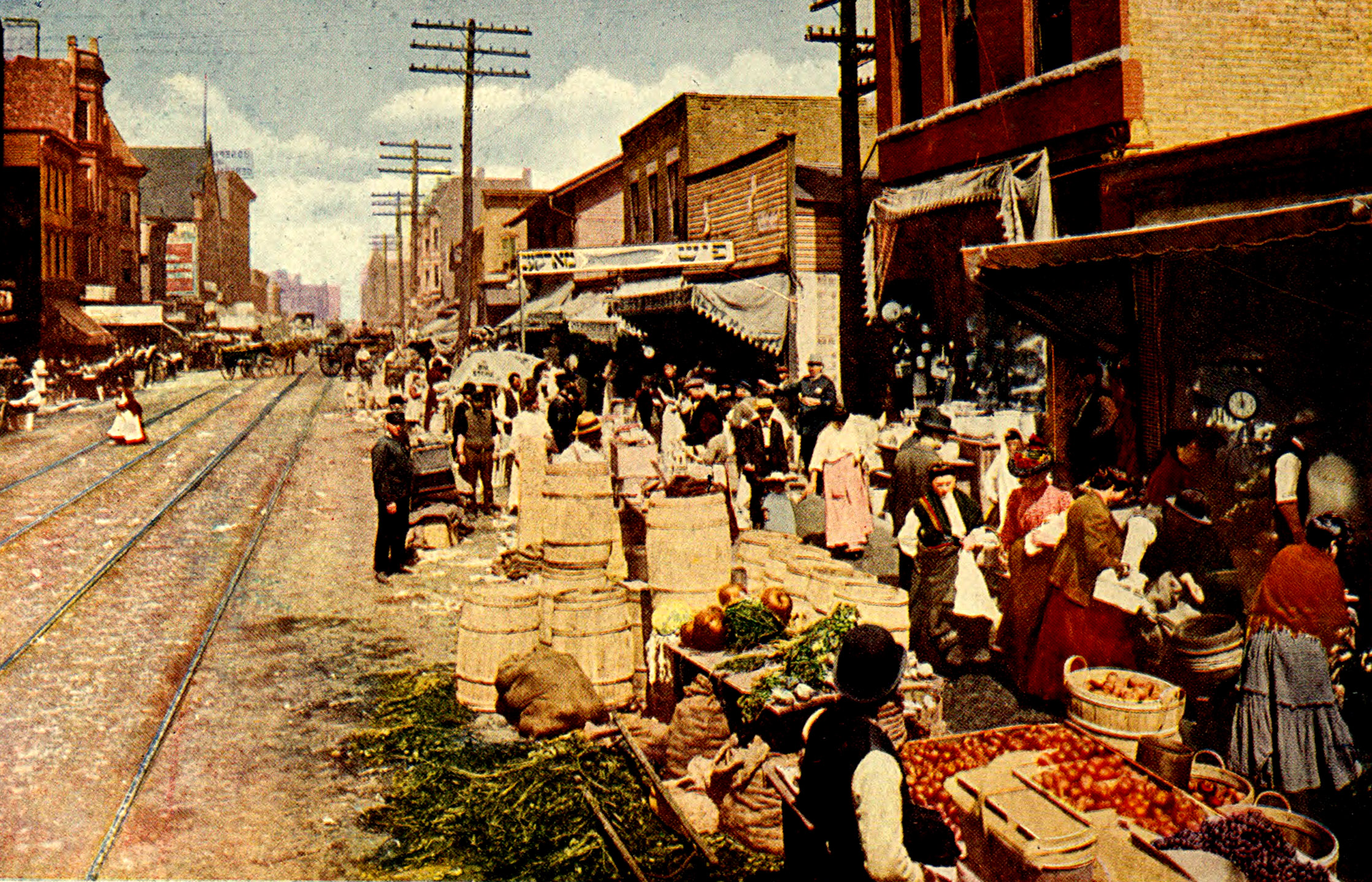
A scene of Maxwell Street circa 1908. The image has been colorized and is taken from a souvenir guide to Chicago printed in 1908. Note the signage in Yiddish that reads 'Fish Market'.

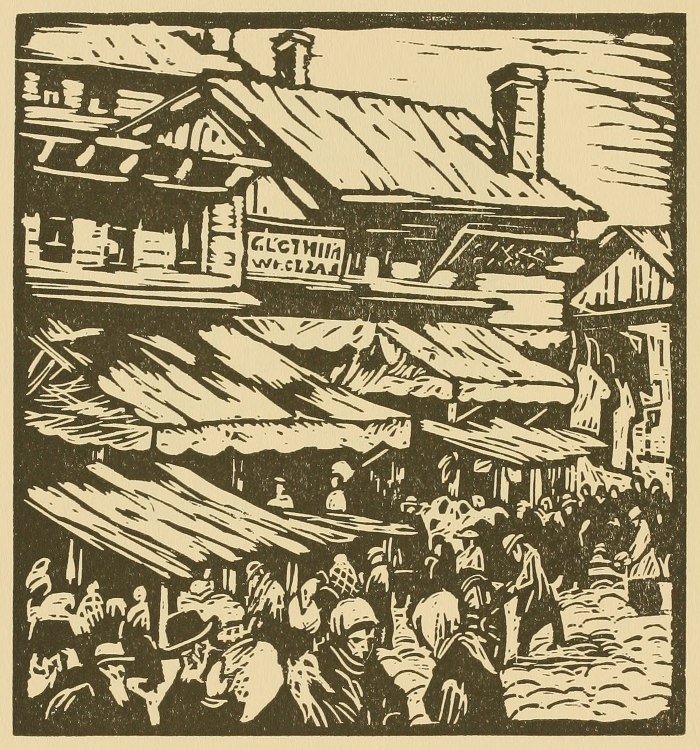
Maxwell Street, Todros Geller woodblock print (1925)

Maxwell Street first appears on a Chicago map in 1847. It was named for Dr. Philip Maxwell. It was originally a wooden plank road that ran from the south branch of the Chicago River west to Blue Island Avenue. The earliest housing was built by and for Irish immigrants who were brought to Chicago to construct the first railroads. It continued to be a "gateway" neighborhood for immigrants and others, including Greeks, Bohemians, Russians, Germans, Italians, Poles, African Americans and Mexicans.

Hull House, the largest and most famous of the 19th-century settlement houses, was established by Jane Addams here to help immigrants transition to their lives in Chicago. The Great Chicago Fire of 1871 started only a few blocks away, but it burned north and east, sparing Maxwell Street and the rest of the Near West Side.

A few blocks north of Maxwell Street are the city's historic Greek and Italian communities. Taylor Street is Chicago's Little Italy, and one can still find Italian cuisine, including pastries and lemon ice. Pilsen, the neighborhood to the south, was originally Bohemian but became Mexican.

The historic church is St. Francis of Assisi, which has evolved through the years with the surrounding community. It originally was German Catholic, then became Italian, and later Mexican, with almost all its masses conducted in Spanish.

Beginning in the 1880s, Eastern European Jews became the dominant ethnic group in the neighborhood, which remained predominantly Jewish until the 1920s. This was the heyday of the open-air pushcart market the neighborhood is famous for. Crime and gangs were rampant at this time, with the Chicago Tribune in 1906 referring to the Maxwell Street area as "the crime center of the country". Other contemporary news reports refer to it as "Bloody Maxwell" and "the Wickedest Police District in the World." In 1888 Maxwell Street Police Station was opened to cope with the burgeoning crime problem.

After 1920, most of the residents were African Americans who came North in the Great Migration (African American), although most businesses continued to be Jewish-owned. In the 1980s and 1990s, the neighborhood and market became predominantly Mexican-American. Most of the older Jewish merchant families had by then moved to the suburbs.

During the period when it was predominantly African American, and especially in the decades after World War II, the area became famous for its street musicians, mostly playing the blues, but also gospel and other styles.

Ira Berkow, in his Maxwell Street, heads each chapter with a newspaper quotation showing a prevailing belief that the city was about to abolish the Maxwell market. The street itself began to shrink in 1926, when the Chicago River was straightened and new railroad tracks on its west bank pushed the east end of Maxwell Street further west. In 1957 the construction of the Dan Ryan Expressway cut Maxwell Street in two and pushed the market west of Union Street. In the 1990s the University of Illinois at Chicago began to expand south of Roosevelt Road, into the Maxwell Street area. A subsidized housing development called the Barbara Jean Wright Courts Apartments chopped off Maxwell's western end at Morgan Street (1000 west).

In October 2008, Maxwell Street Market moved to the intersection of Roosevelt Rd. and S. Des Plaines Avenue.

== The Maxwell Street Market ==
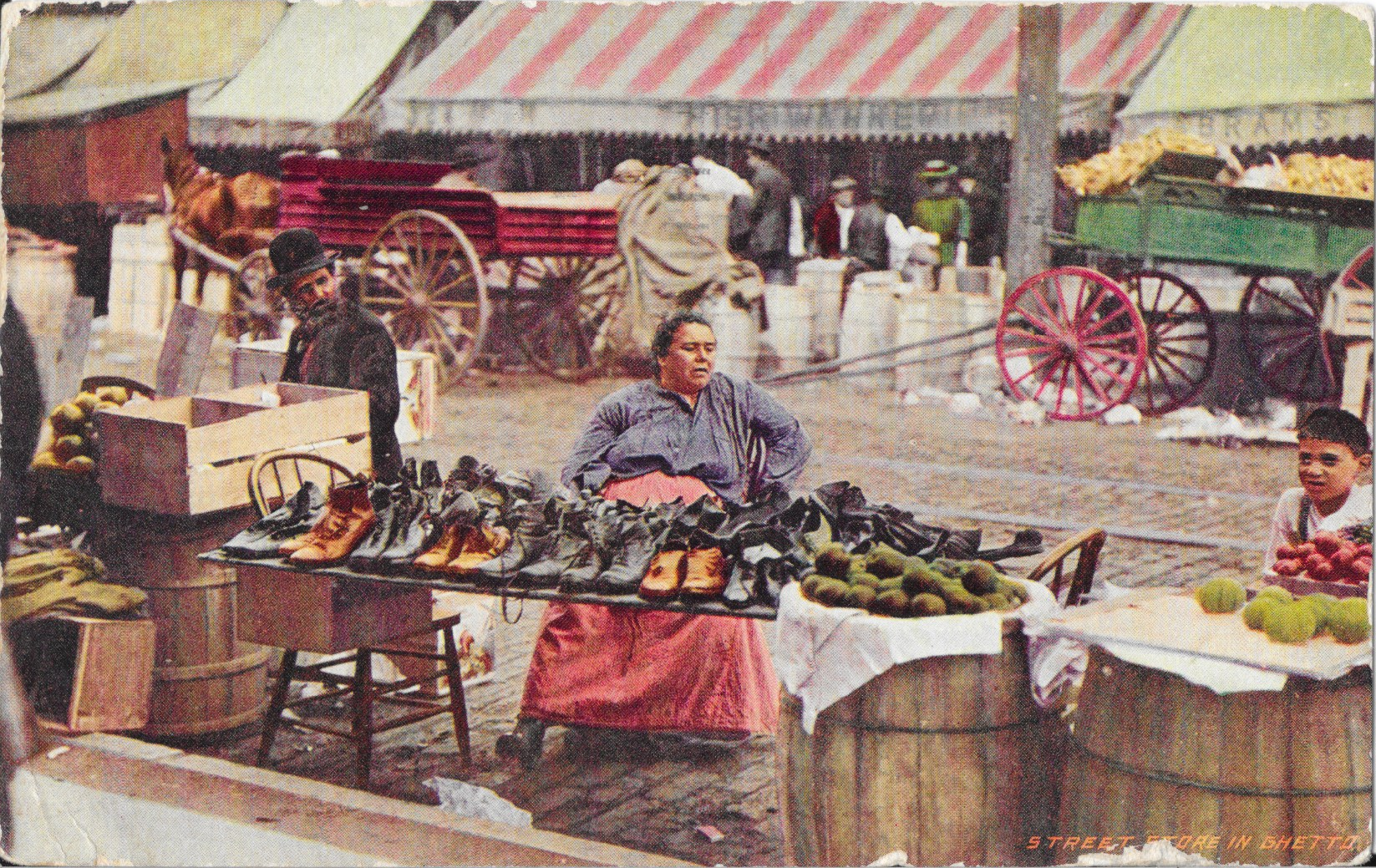
A street vendor selling shoes circa 1912

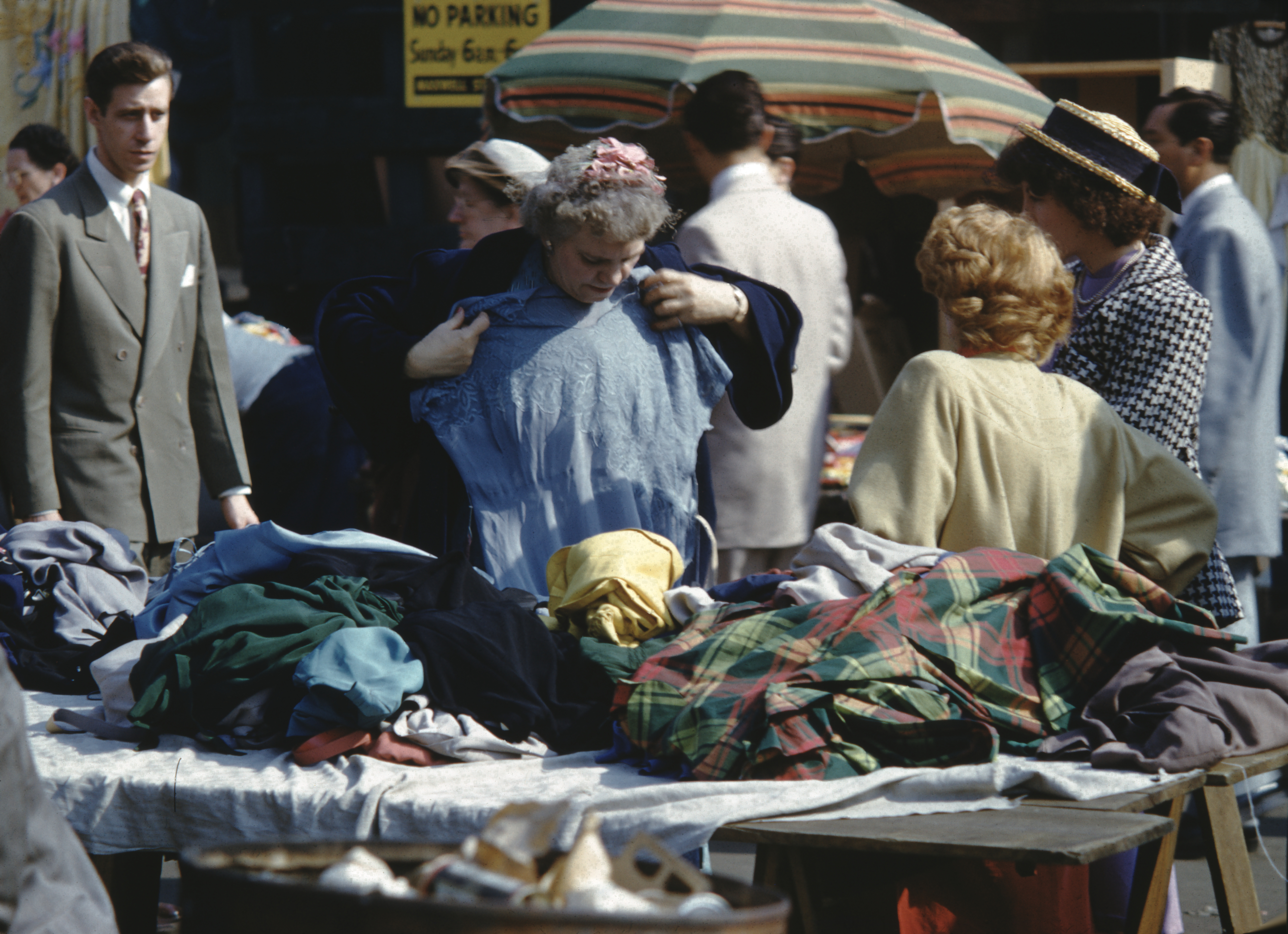
A woman considering the purchase of a dress at Maxwell Street market circa 1950s

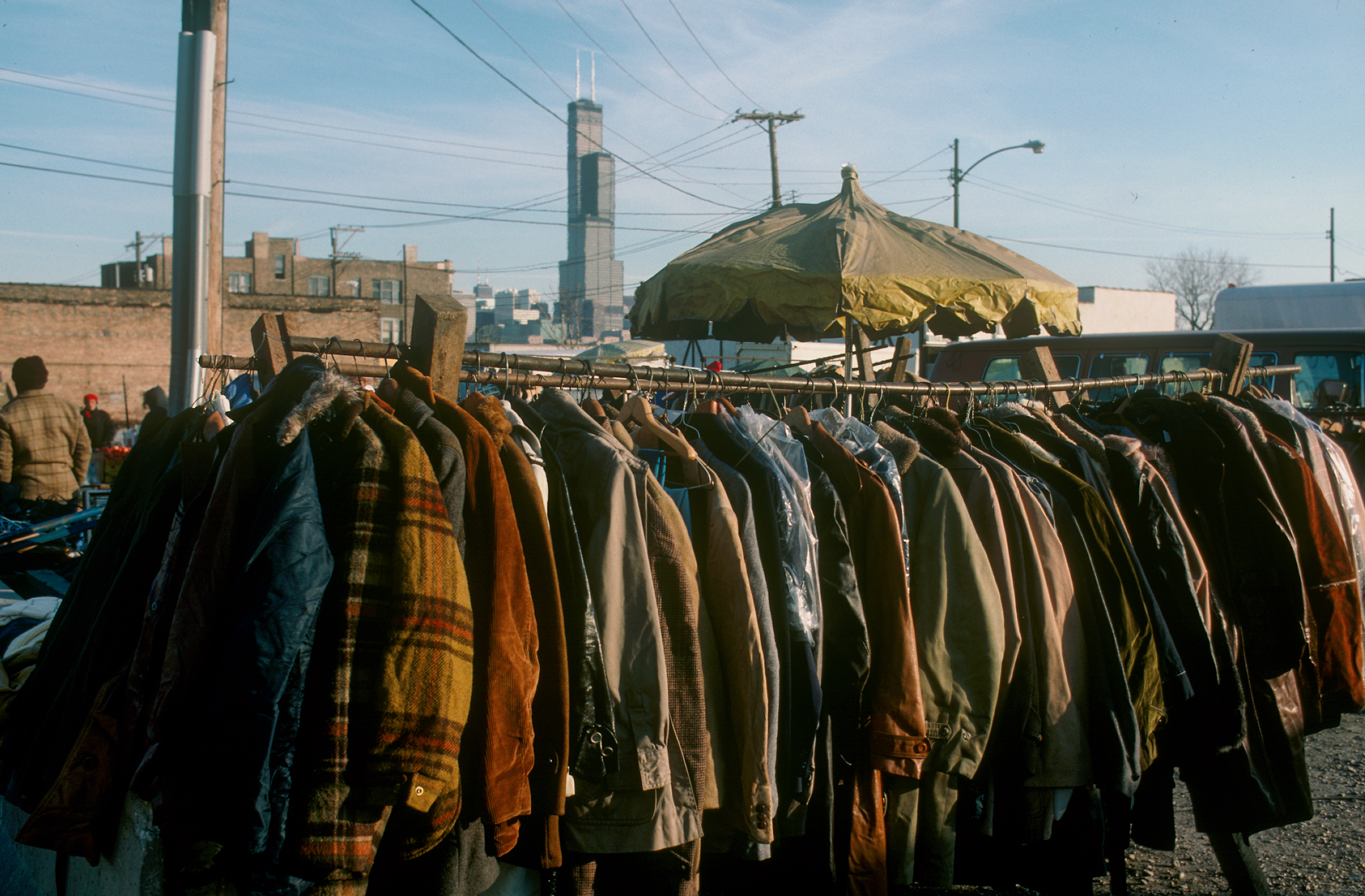
Coats for sale in the Maxwell Street Market in 1987

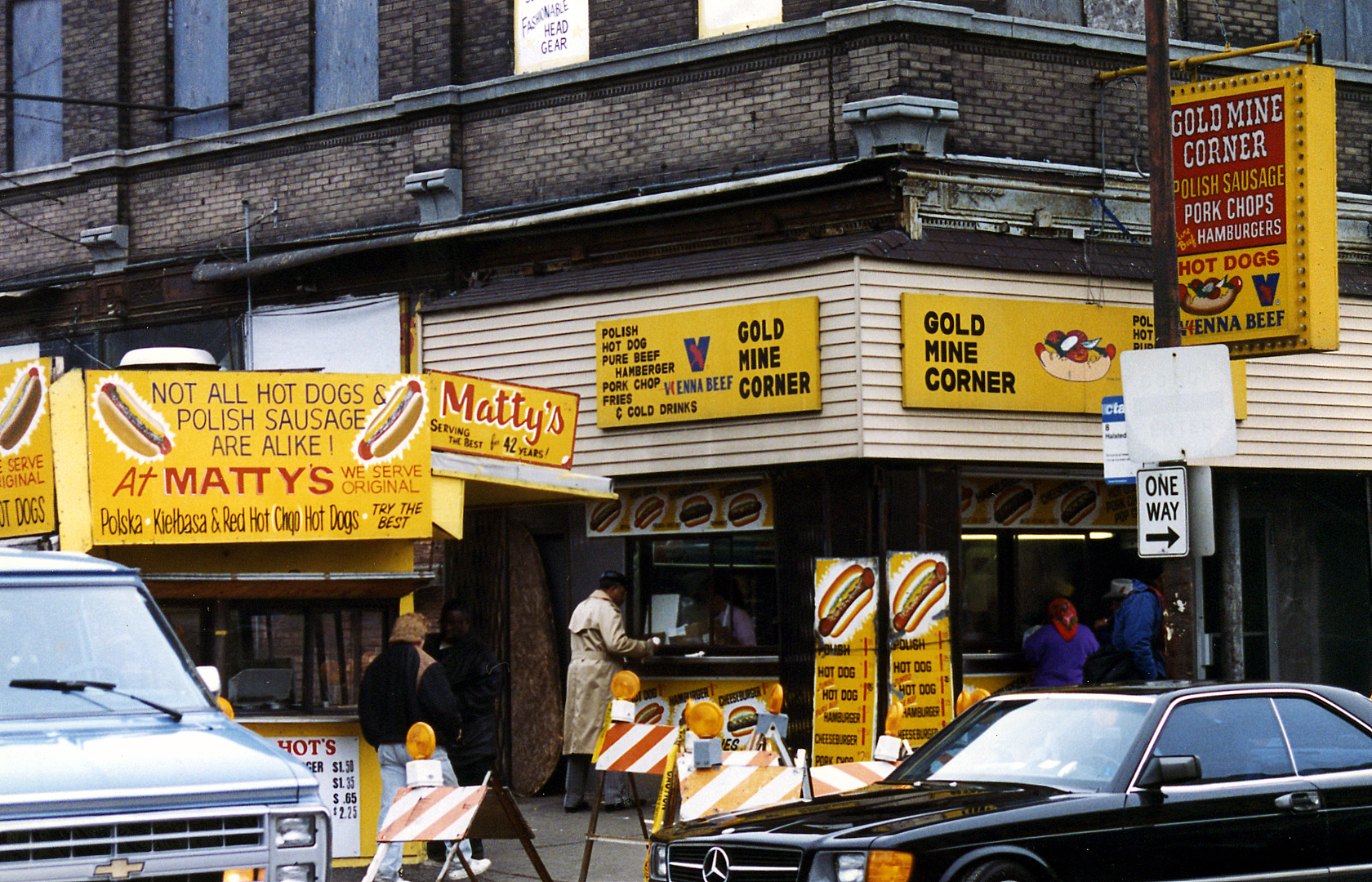
Maxwell Street Polish for sale in 1993

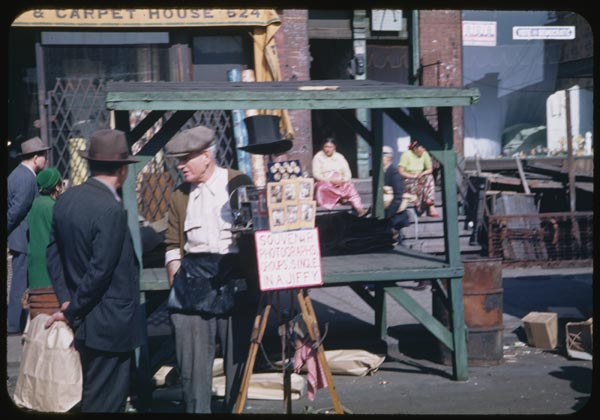
A street photographer on Maxwell Street in the late 1940s

The Original Maxwell Street Market was an impromptu ghetto market established in the late 19th century by newly arrived Jewish residents from Eastern Europe. A Sunday-only affair, it was a precursor to the flea market scene in Chicago. The market was officially recognized by the city in 1912. By the time of its demise (1994) it occupied approximately nine square blocks which was centered at Maxwell and Halsted Streets and stretched from Roosevelt Road to 16th Street. Although there were many fine stationary department stores located in the area, the most notable feature was its open-air market. There one could buy almost anything, new or secondhand, legal and illegal, even though the old Chicago Police Academy on O'Brien Street was adjacent to it.

In need of jobs and quick cash, fledgling entrepreneurs came to Maxwell Street to earn their livelihood. Many say it was the largest open-air market in the country. From clothes, to produce, to cars, appliances, tools, and virtually anything anyone might want, Maxwell Street offered discount items to consumers and was an economic hub for poor people looking to get ahead. Merchandise was often considered to have originated from hijacked or pirated railcars/railyards and transport rigs for quick resale and dissemination of articles. Few questions were asked about the origin of a vendor's items for sale, particularly if the price was "right."

Maxwell Street Market also represented a fundamental change in American retail and economic history. The market was a response to and rejection of stand-alone retail establishments and their price structures. This microcosm of commerce recognized the availability and influx of Asian and world imports and markets (Taiwan, Japan, China, Mexico) priced dramatically lower than American produced goods. Wholesalers lined Roosevelt Road with goods from all over the world; savvy vendors would buy from them to resell on the market at a profit, usually at a 100% markup. The resulting price(s) fell well below goods available elsewhere, due to low overhead. The market also responded to the spending power of immigrants and minorities; they could take their cash where they were welcome, accepted, and could shop. This transition and market did not go unnoticed; subsequent retailers such as Kmart and Walmart built upon these opportunities. The economic impact and spending dollars of Maxwell Street Market were not unnoticed. It may have become obvious to corporate interests that "cash was green," regardless of clientele.

In an era of civil unrest and political change, Maxwell Street Market thrived as a multicultural phenomenon. Each culture and "group" respected and honored the other and mostly interacted outside what were then current national issues. This milieu of culture and ethnicity was a distinctly American phenomenon; Maxwell Street has been called the Ellis Island of the Midwest. Local politics had an interest in the market's audience. Election time often brought many placards and signs (some billboard-like). Everything seemed to work and run as a well-oiled machine. "Spot-holders" (allegedly of mob influence) roamed the streets and interacted with vendors to maintain regular vending sites for which unobtrusive cash payments were accepted. Those not being gratuitous often arrived only to find their "spot" taken by another vendor.

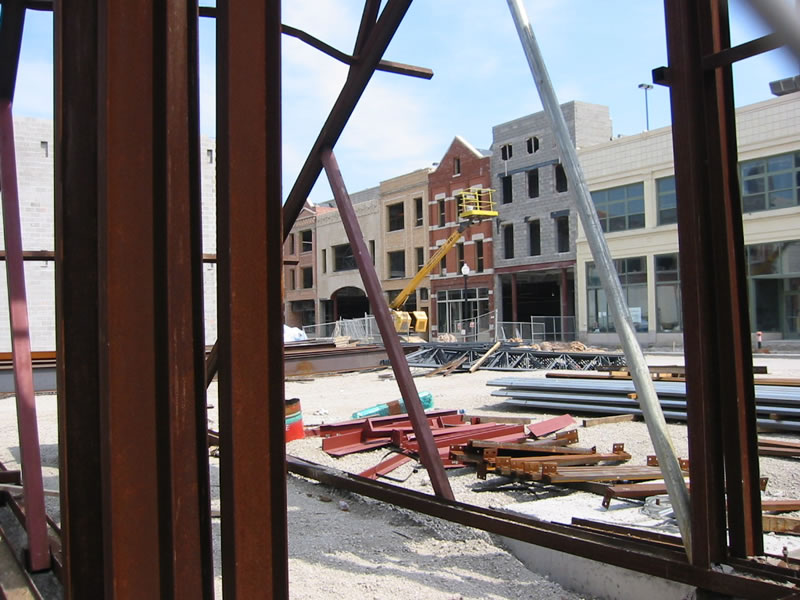
Maxwell stage set Maxwell Street retail facades in the process of being reconstructed in 2005

In 1994, the Maxwell Street Market was moved by the City of Chicago to accommodate expansion of the University of Illinois at Chicago. It was relocated a few blocks east to Canal Street and renamed the New Maxwell Street Market. It was moved again to Des Plaines Avenue in September 2008.

The documentary film Cheat You Fair: The Story of Maxwell Street, by award-winning filmmaker Phil Ranstrom and narrated by actor Joe Mantegna, was first shown at the Chicago International Documentary Film Festival in April, 2007; at The Sundance Film Festival in January 2008; and in Belgium and Poland. The film details the rise and fall of the Maxwell Street and examines the history of the market, the development of the electric urban blues, the fight to save the market, and the gentrification of the Maxwell Street neighborhood. Cheat You Fair includes the last recorded interview by Bo Diddley and is considered by many to be the definitive work on Maxwell Street. Chicago journalist Rick Kogan called it "One of the most remarkable pieces of work I've ever seen."

== Blues on Maxwell Street ==
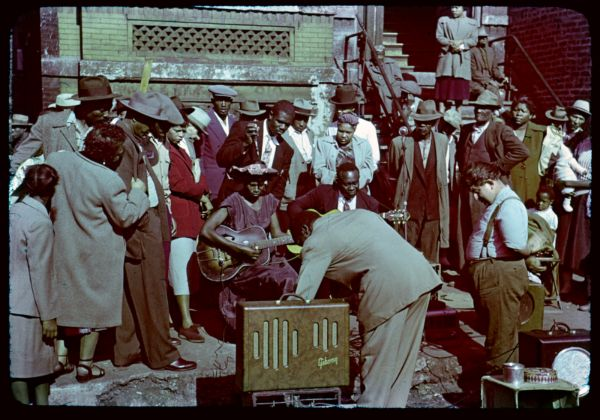
Maxwell St. artist and onlookers circa 1950

In the 1930s and 1940s, when many black musicians came to Chicago from the segregated South, they brought with them outdoor music.

But when the early blues musicians began playing outside on Maxwell Street—the place where they could be heard by the greatest number of people—they realized they needed either a louder than standard Resonator guitar (e.g., Arvella Gray) or amplifiers and electrical instruments (e.g., Jim Brewer) in order to be heard. Over several decades, the use of these new instruments, and the interaction between established city musicians such as Big Bill Broonzy and new arrivals from the South, produced a new musical genre—electrified, urban blues, later coined, "Chicago Blues."

This amplified, new sound was different from the acoustic country blues played in the South. It was popularized by blues giants such as Muddy Waters, Little Walter, Bo Diddley and Howlin' Wolf and evolved into rock & roll. From the first, the blues signified a lament or elegy for hard times, though it outgrew that limitation. When economic decline in the American South after World War I caused many Delta Blues and jazz musicians—notably Louis Armstrong—to migrate north to Chicago, the first economically secure class willing to help them was the mostly Jewish merchants of the area around Maxwell Street, who by that time were able to rent or own store buildings. These merchants encouraged blues players to set up near their storefronts and provided them with electric extension cords to run the new high-tech instruments. Shoppers lured by the chance to hear blues music could be grabbed and hauled into the store where they were sold a suit of clothes, shoes, etc. One of the regular performers was the self-styled Maxwell Street Jimmy Davis, who played in the area for over 40 years.

The last blues performances on Maxwell Street occurred in 1999–2000, on a bandstand erected by Frank "Little Sonny" Scott, Jr., near the north-east corner of Maxwell and Halsted Streets, on land recently vacated by the demolition of a historic building. The extension cord ran from the last remaining building in use, the Maxworks Cooperative headquarters, 300 feet (91 m) east, at 716 Maxwell Street. One day a university crew arrived and erected a chain-link fence between the bandstand and the sidewalk, effectively banning the performances though they continued a few weeks longer on the too-narrow sidewalk.

== Expansion of the University of Illinois at Chicago into Maxwell Street ==
The University of Illinois at Chicago was established at the Harrison/Halsted area in 1965, the location chosen by Mayor Richard J. Daley. This was unpopular with the locals, who had been promised more low-income housing by the city, and there were numerous protests, especially by the Italian-American and Mexican-American communities. The university had little interaction with the surrounding community and decided against keeping local businesses in its plans for expansion in the 1980s. The university slowly began buying land in the Maxwell area and demolishing buildings. It had been rumored that the university never officially announced its plans in the 1980s, but circulated speculation that it would exercise eminent domain, which was backed by state legislation. This strategy may have saved the school millions of dollars, not only because people slowly moved out and did not have to be compensated, but also because real estate prices continued to drop in the area through the 1980s and early 1990s, because of the rumors.

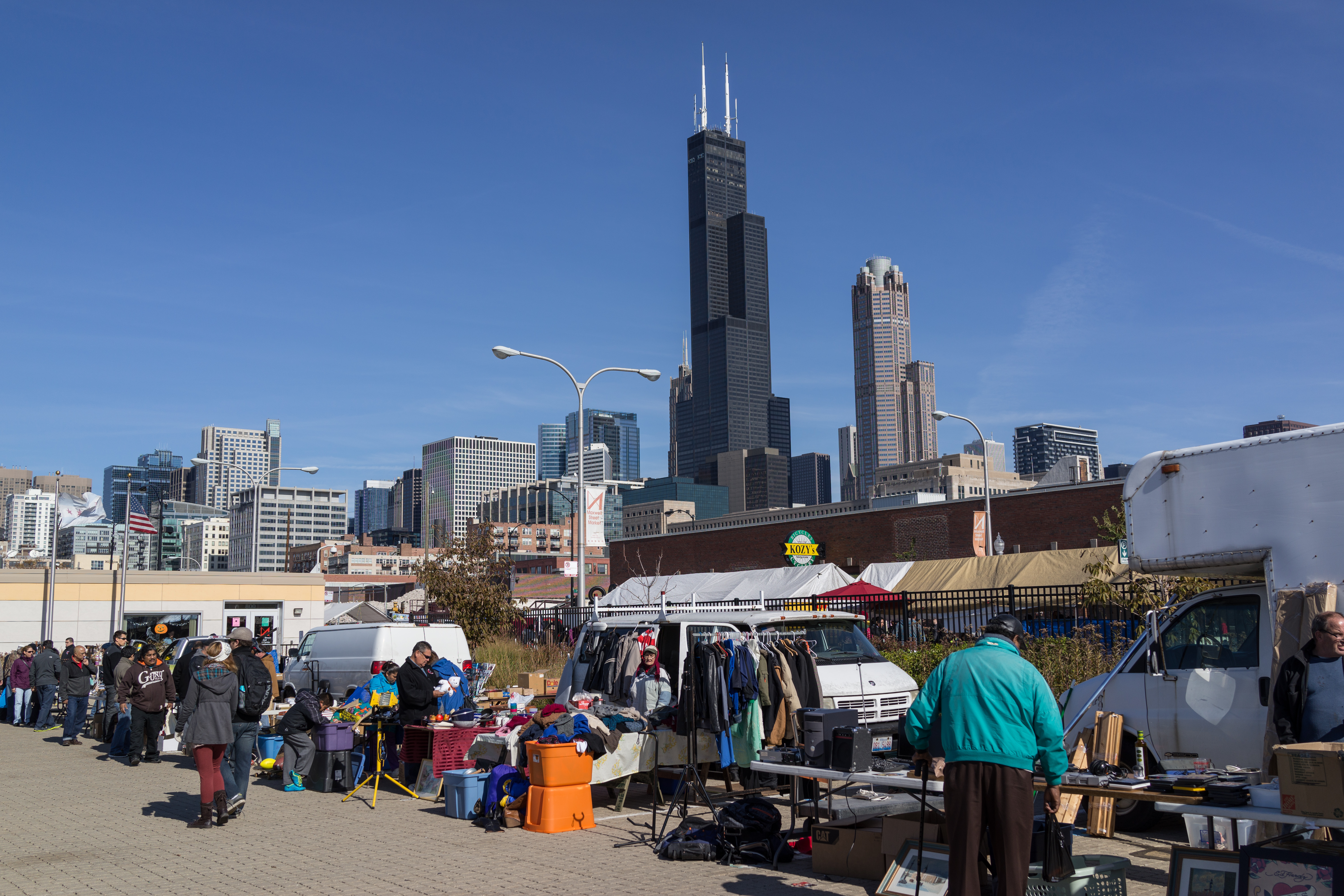
Vendors at New Maxwell Street Market in 2013

When the school finally made public its plans to move the Maxwell Street Market and demolish the buildings, the community petitioned to list the Maxwell Street Market area on the National Register of Historic Places as a historic district, in 1994, and again in 2000. This effort was spearheaded by the Maxwell Street Historic Preservation Coalition, a nonprofit group based in Chicago. The proposal was eventually turned down as a result of efforts by the university, backed by Mayor Richard M. Daley (son of Richard J. Daley). In 2004 the Maxwell Street Historic Preservation Coalition was renamed the Maxwell Street Foundation, reflecting its current mission to preserve the history of the market through its website and other outreach efforts. The foundation also serves as an advocate for the New Maxwell Street Market, a downsized version of the original, located on Desplaines Street from Roosevelt Road north to Harrison Street.

== Notable residents ==
- Jacob Arvey, 20th century Democratic politician.
- Benny Goodman, jazz musician.
- Davy Miller, gangster.
- Barney Ross, boxer, dubbed "the Pride of the Ghetto".

== In history and popular culture ==
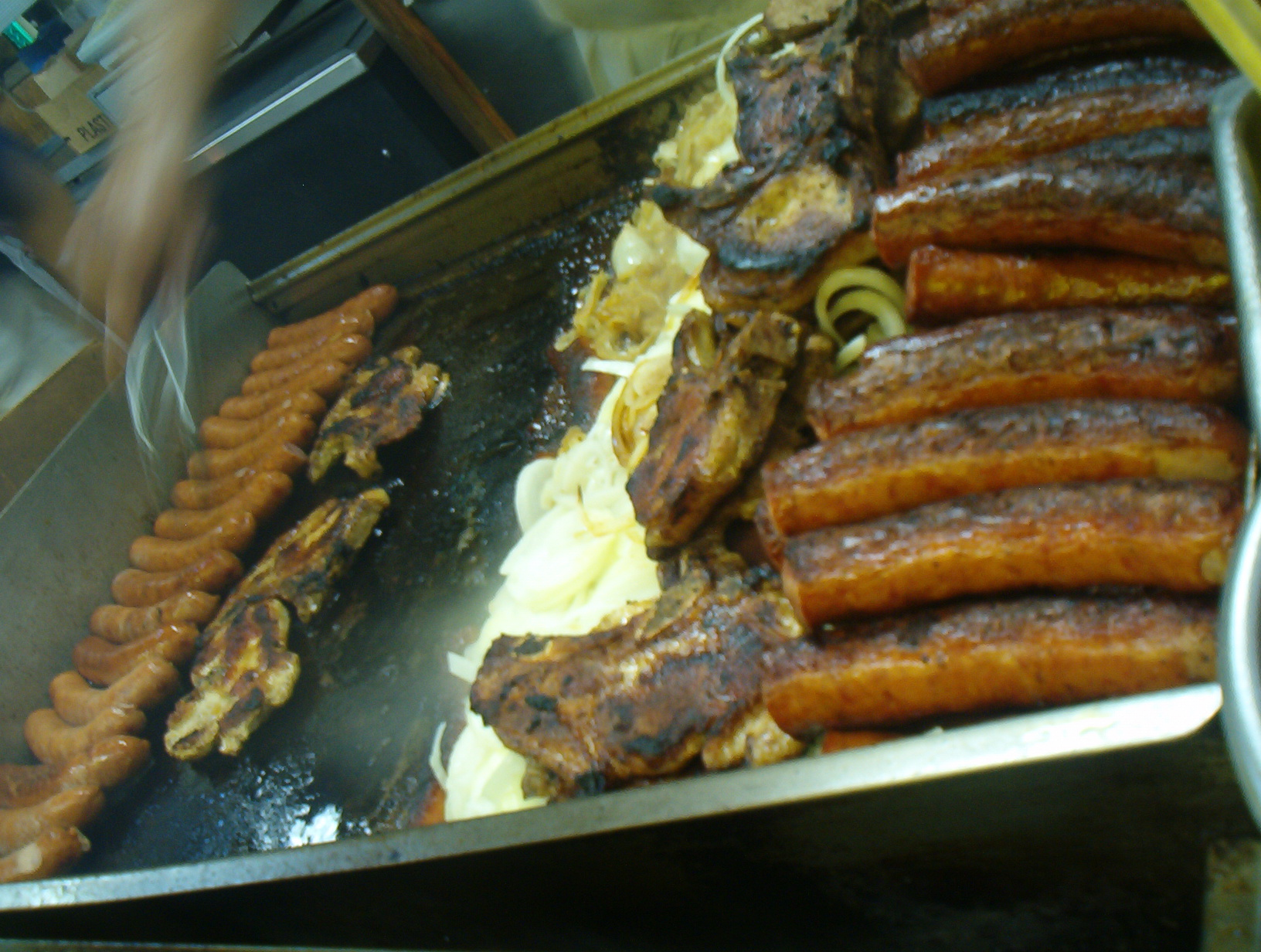
Maxwell Street Polish sausages being cooked next to onion and pork chops

- The direct-sales entrepreneur Ron Popeil began his career as a street vendor at the Maxwell Street Market.
- The clarinetist and band leader Benny Goodman was born in 1909 near the Maxwell Street neighborhood and spent most of his youth there.
- The Maxwell Street Police Station, at Maxwell and Morgan Streets, was "Hill Street Station" in the 1980s television series Hill Street Blues. It was also the station exterior used in Chicago P.D.
- Maxwell Street was featured in the 1980 film The Blues Brothers, in which it was portrayed as a thriving African-American community. The scene opens with John Lee Hooker playing his song "Boom Boom" with Big Walter Horton playing harmonica, drummer Willie "Big Eyes" Smith and pianist Pinetop Perkins on the street as the stars of the film, John Belushi and Dan Aykroyd, enter a restaurant owned and operated by Aretha Franklin, looking for Matt "Guitar" Murphy and "Blue" Lou Marini. Muddy Waters was due to play alongside John Lee Hooker but was ill on the day of shooting so he did not appear in the film.
- In 1988, United Artists released an occult thriller, Child's Play, featuring sets on Maxwell Street, including a disabled bus with the word "Auto" spray-painted on it, which had been sitting at 709 Maxwell since 1984. Scrap wood was purchased from Maxworks Cooperative for a bonfire in front of the bus, filmed for the movie.
- The professional wrestler Colt Cabana is billed as being from "Maxwell Street in Chicago, Illinois".
- The Maxwell Street market of the 1960s/1970s is mentioned in the short story "Barbie-Q", by Sandra Cisneros, in her 1991 collection, Woman Hollering Creek. The story is about two Chicana girls who buy fire-damaged Barbie dolls sold at a discount by a street vendor.
- Maxwell Street is the namesake for the Chicago-based Maxwell Street Klezmer Band.
- Cheat You Fair: The Story of Maxwell Street is a 2005 documentary about the area.

=== "Maxwell Street Days" ===
Many towns, particularly in Illinois and Wisconsin, hold a regular "Maxwell Street Days" event, where local merchants bring their goods out into the street and sell them at discounted prices. The practice first became popular in the 1950s and continues to the present day in many communities, with one of the largest and most popular such events taking place annually on State Street in Madison, Wisconsin. Early incarnations of Maxwell Street Days often took advantage of Jewish stereotypes; the Anti-Defamation League criticized one such festival in an unspecified Illinois town in 1952 where participants "wore artificial 'Jewish' noses and beards" and "spoke with a mock Jewish dialect".
