= Hill Street Blues =

American police drama television series (1981–1987)

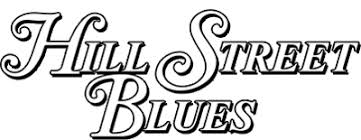
- Genre: Police procedural
- Created by: Steven Bochco; Michael Kozoll
- Starring: Daniel J. Travanti; Veronica Hamel; Michael Conrad; Bruce Weitz; Joe Spano; Michael Warren; Charles Haid; James B. Sikking; Betty Thomas; Kiel Martin; Taurean Blacque; René Enríquez; Ed Marinaro; Barbara Bosson; Robert Prosky; Ken Olin; Mimi Kuzyk; Dennis Franz; Robert Clohessy; Megan Gallagher
- Theme music composer: Mike Post
- Country of origin: United States
- Original language: English
- No. of seasons: 7
- No. of episodes: 146 (list of episodes)

Production
- Production locations: Republic Studios, Los Angeles, California
- Running time: 49 minutes
- Production company: MTM Enterprises

Original release
- Network: NBC
- Release: January 15, 1981 – May 12, 1987

Related
- Beverly Hills Buntz

Hill Street Blues is an American police procedural television series that aired on NBC in prime-time from January 15, 1981, to May 12, 1987, for 146 episodes. The show chronicles the lives of the Metropolitan Police Department staff of a single police station located on Hill Street in an unnamed large U.S. city. The "blues" are the police officers in their blue uniforms. It also describes the mood of weary resignation, melancholy, and quiet struggle mixed with a small, hopeful readiness the officers faced every shift.

The show received critical acclaim, and its production innovations influenced many subsequent dramatic television series produced in the United States and Canada. In 1981, the series won eight Emmy Awards, a debut season record surpassed only by The West Wing in 2000. The show won a total of 26 Emmy Awards (out of 98 Emmy Award nominations) during its run, including four consecutive wins for Outstanding Drama Series from 1981 to 1984.

== Background ==
MTM Enterprises developed the series on behalf of NBC, appointing Steven Bochco and Michael Kozoll as series writers. The writers were allowed the freedom to create a series that brought together a number of fresh ideas in TV drama. Each episode featured intertwined storylines, some of which were resolved within the episode, with others developing throughout a season. The conflicts between the work lives and private lives of the characters were also significant.

The series features a strong focus on the workplace struggle between abstract ethics and pragmatic reality. Television author John Javna described it as "a cop show for the Big Chill generation, discovering that it takes all of their energy to keep even a few of their ideals alive while they struggle to succeed."

Almost every episode begins with a pre-credit sequence (or teaser) consisting of a briefing and roll call to start the day shift. From season three on, a "Previously on..." montage of clips from up to six episodes precedes the roll call. Author Steven Johnson wrote of the importance to viewers of each episode's roll calls, saying that they "performed a crucial function, introducing some of the primary threads and providing helpful contextual explanations for them." Also, almost all episodes take place over the course of a single day, many concluding with Captain Frank Furillo (Daniel J. Travanti) and public defender Joyce Davenport (Veronica Hamel) in a domestic situation, often in bed, discussing how their respective days went. The series deals with real-life issues and employs professional jargon and slang to a greater extent than had been seen before on television.

Each week after roll call, from Season 1 until Michael Conrad's death partway through Season 4, Sergeant Phil Esterhaus says, "Let's be careful out there." Sergeant Lucy Bates continues the tradition through the end of Season 4, as a tribute to Conrad. From Season 5 until most of Season 6, Sergeant Stan Jablonski concludes his roll calls with, "Let's go out there and do it to them before they do it to us." At one point, at the suggestion of Detective Mayo, Jablonski softens this to, "Let's do our job before they do theirs." From then on, the show changed directions and conclusions (and even roll calls) were dropped.

== Production ==
Hill Street Blues employed what was, at that time, a unique style of camera usage for weeknight television productions, such as filming close in with action cuts rapidly between stories. Rather than studio (floor) cameras, handhelds were used to enhance this style. Overheard, off-screen dialogue aurally augmented the "documentary" feel with respect to the filmed action of a scene.

Although primarily filmed in Los Angeles (both on location and at Radford Studio Center in Studio City), the series is set in a generic unnamed inner-city location with a feel of an American urban center in the Midwest or Northeast. Bochco reportedly intended this fictional city to be a hybrid of Chicago, Buffalo, and Pittsburgh. The show's opening and closing and cut-scenes were filmed in Chicago.

The program's focus on failure and those at the bottom of the social scale is pronounced, in contrast to Bochco's later project L.A. Law. Inspired by police procedural detective novels such as Ed McBain's 1956 Cop Hater, the show has been described as Barney Miller out of doors. The focus on the bitter realities of 1980s urban living was revolutionary for its time.

== Music ==
The theme music for Hill Street Blues was written by Mike Post, featuring Larry Carlton on guitar. It was released as a single and became a major US hit, reaching #10 on the Billboard Hot 100 in November 1981, winning the Grammy Award for Best Pop Instrumental Performance.

A soundtrack album for the series was released on LP as Indiana Records HSBP 2222 in 1985. Post's music was arranged by Derek Wadsworth and conducted by Wadsworth under his pseudonym Daniel Caine.

It was re-issued in 1990 on the Silva Screen label as FILMCD 702.

=== Track listing ===
A Side
No.	Title	Length
1.	"Theme from Hill Street Blues"	3:06
2.	"Cruising on the Hill"	2:11
3.	"Field of Honour"	2:!3
4.	"Blues in the Day"	2:07
5.	"Wasted"	2:15
6.	"The City"	1:53
7.	"No Jive"	3:25

B Side
No.	Title	Length
1.	"Freedom's End"	2:03
2.	"Night on the Hill"	1:59
3.	"Forever"	1:35
4.	"Counsellor"	2:11
5.	"Captain"	1:59
6.	"A Friend on the Hill"	1:51
7.	"Officer Down"	2:18
8.	"Suite from Hill Street Blues"	5:07
Total length:		37:13

== Seasons ==
Pilot: Brandon Tartikoff commissioned a series from MTM Productions, which assigned Bochco and Kozoll to the project. The pilot was produced in 1980 but was held back as a mid-season replacement so as not to get lost among the other programs debuting in the fall of 1980. Barbara Bosson, who was married to Bochco, had the idea to fashion the series into four- or five-episode story "arcs". Robert Butler directed the pilot and developed a look and style inspired by the 1977 documentary The Police Tapes, in which filmmakers used handheld cameras to follow police officers in the South Bronx.

Season 1: The pilot aired on Thursday, January 15, 1981, at 10:00 pm, which would be the show's time slot for nearly its entire run. The second episode aired two nights later; the next week followed a similar pattern (episode 3 on Thursday, episode 4 on Saturday). NBC had ordered 13 episodes, and the season was supposed to end on May 25 with a minor cliffhanger (the resolution of Sgt. Esterhaus' wedding). Instead, growing critical acclaim prompted NBC to order an additional four episodes to air during the May sweeps. Bochco and Kozoll quickly fashioned this into a new story arc, which aired as two two-hour episodes to close the season. In the first season's original ending, Officer Joe Coffey (Ed Marinaro) is shot dead during a vehicle stop. However, later on the producers decided that Coffey should remain, so the scene was edited to show him being seriously wounded and taken to a hospital. (The character would eventually be killed in the sixth season.) This echoes the shooting and resurrection of Renko and Hill at the beginning of the season, providing unintentional thematic bookends to the first season.

In early episodes, the opening theme had several clearly audible edits; this was replaced by a longer, unedited version partway through the second season. The end credits for the pilot differed from the rest of the series in that the background still shot of the station house was completely different. Ranking 87th out of 96 shows, it became the lowest-rated program ever renewed for a second season at the time. However, it was only renewed for ten episodes. A full order was picked up partway through the season.

Season 2: A writers strike pushed the start of the season forward to October 29, meaning that only 18 episodes were completed that year. Kozoll was now listed as a consultant, signifying his diminished role in the show. He later stated he was already feeling burnt out, and in fact was relying more on car chases and action to fill the scripts. A less muted version of the closing theme was played over the end credits.

Season 3: Kozoll left the show at the end of season two, replaced for the most part by Anthony Yerkovich (who later created Miami Vice after leaving Hill Street Blues at the end of this season) and David Milch. This was the show's most popular season in terms of viewership, as it finished at #21. This was also the birth of "Must See TV", as the show was joined by Cheers, Taxi and Fame. The network promoted Thursdays as "the best night of television on television." Michael Conrad was increasingly absent from the show due to his ongoing, and ultimately unsuccessful, battle with cancer.

Season 4: Following his death on November 22, 1983, Michael Conrad's final appearance was broadcast halfway through the season in February 1984 in a memorable send-off episode, "Grace Under Pressure". Det. Harry Garibaldi (Ken Olin) was introduced at the end of the season as a temporary replacement for Det. J.D. LaRue (Kiel Martin) who was supposedly suffering from mononucleosis. The show won its fourth and final Emmy for Outstanding Drama Series this season.

Season 5: The show changed drastically this season, entering a somewhat "soap opera-ish" period according to Bochco. New characters included Sgt. Stanislaus Jablonski (Robert Prosky) and Det. Patsy Mayo (Mimi Kuzyk). Det. Garibaldi was now a regular, while Fay Furillo became a full-time member of the squad room as a victim's advocate. Bochco was dismissed at season's end by then-MTM President Arthur Price. The firing was due to Bochco's cost overruns, coupled with the fact that the show had achieved the 100-episode milestone needed to successfully syndicate it.

Betty Thomas won an Emmy for Outstanding Supporting Actress in a Drama Series this season. However, at the awards ceremony, Barry Bremen, aka "The Great Imposter", rushed the stage ahead of Thomas and claimed she was unable to attend. He then claimed the award and left the stage, confusing viewers and robbing Thomas of her moment in the sun, although she returned and spoke after the ad break. Presenter Peter Graves suggested that the imposter was "on his way to the cooler."

Season 6: Major changes occurred as Det. Mayo, Det. Garibaldi, Lt. Ray Calletano (René Enríquez), Fay Furillo (Barbara Bosson) and Officer Leo Schnitz (Robert Hirschfeld) were all phased out at the start of the season, and Joe Coffey left near the end. The sole addition was Lt. Norman Buntz, played by Dennis Franz, who had played a different character, the corrupt "bad guy" Detective Sal Benedetto, in several season 3 episodes. Buntz and Benedetto were doppelgängers. Peter Jurasik played a new recurring character ("Sid the Snitch"), who often teamed with Buntz. In a 1992 interview on Later with Bob Costas, Ken Olin claimed these characters were removed so the new show-runners would receive royalties. Bosson's departure, however, was voluntary. She left after a salary conflict with the new executive producer who, according to the actress, had also wanted her character, Fay, to go back to being a shrewish "thorn in her ex-husband's side".

The season premiere opened with a roll call filled with officers never before seen on the show, briefly fooling viewers into thinking the entire cast had been replaced. It was then revealed that this was, in fact, the night shift. The action then cut to the day shift pursuing their after-work activities. Another unique episode from this season explained through flashbacks how Furillo and Davenport met and fell in love. This was the first season that Travanti and Hamel were not nominated for the Emmy for Outstanding Lead Actor/Actress in a Drama Series.

During this season the show featured the first lesbian recurring character on a major network; the character was police officer Kate McBride, played by Lindsay Crouse.

Season 7: Up until now, each episode of the series started with the morning roll call. Episodes from season 7 break away from tradition, showing characters at home or working. The roll call becomes a minor part of the beginning. Some episodes do not show roll call at all.

Officer Patrick Flaherty (Robert Clohessy) and Officer Tina Russo (Megan Gallagher) joined this season in an attempt to rekindle the Bates/Coffey relationship of years past. Stan Jablonski became a secondary character part way through this season, and when Travanti announced he would not return the next year, the producers decided to end the show in 1987. The program was also moved to Tuesday nights almost midway through the season after nearly six years to make way for L.A. Law on Thursdays.

This was the only season that Bruce Weitz (Det. Mick Belker) was not nominated for the Emmy for Outstanding Supporting Actor in a Drama Series. Only Betty Thomas was nominated, making her the sole member of the cast to be nominated in all seasons. This was the only season for which the show was not nominated for Outstanding Drama Series.

=== Broadcast history and Nielsen ratings ===
Years after the show had run, Daniel J. Travanti commented: "NBC tried their best to get rid of us, and heaven knows why. They did their best to destroy us and only ordered 13 episodes — that's how confident they weren't. And when did they put us on the air? January 15, 17, 22 and 24. That's disgustingly destructive, stupid and idiotic. There aren't words strong enough. You put us on the air for four episodes that are thrown away in nine days? People barely saw us. What the fuck was that? Everyone was up in arms and screaming at NBC, and NBC was screaming at them. If they had dumped Hill Street Blues, they would've been called the idiots of all time. Their being in that weak position worked in our favor – but also threatened us all the time."

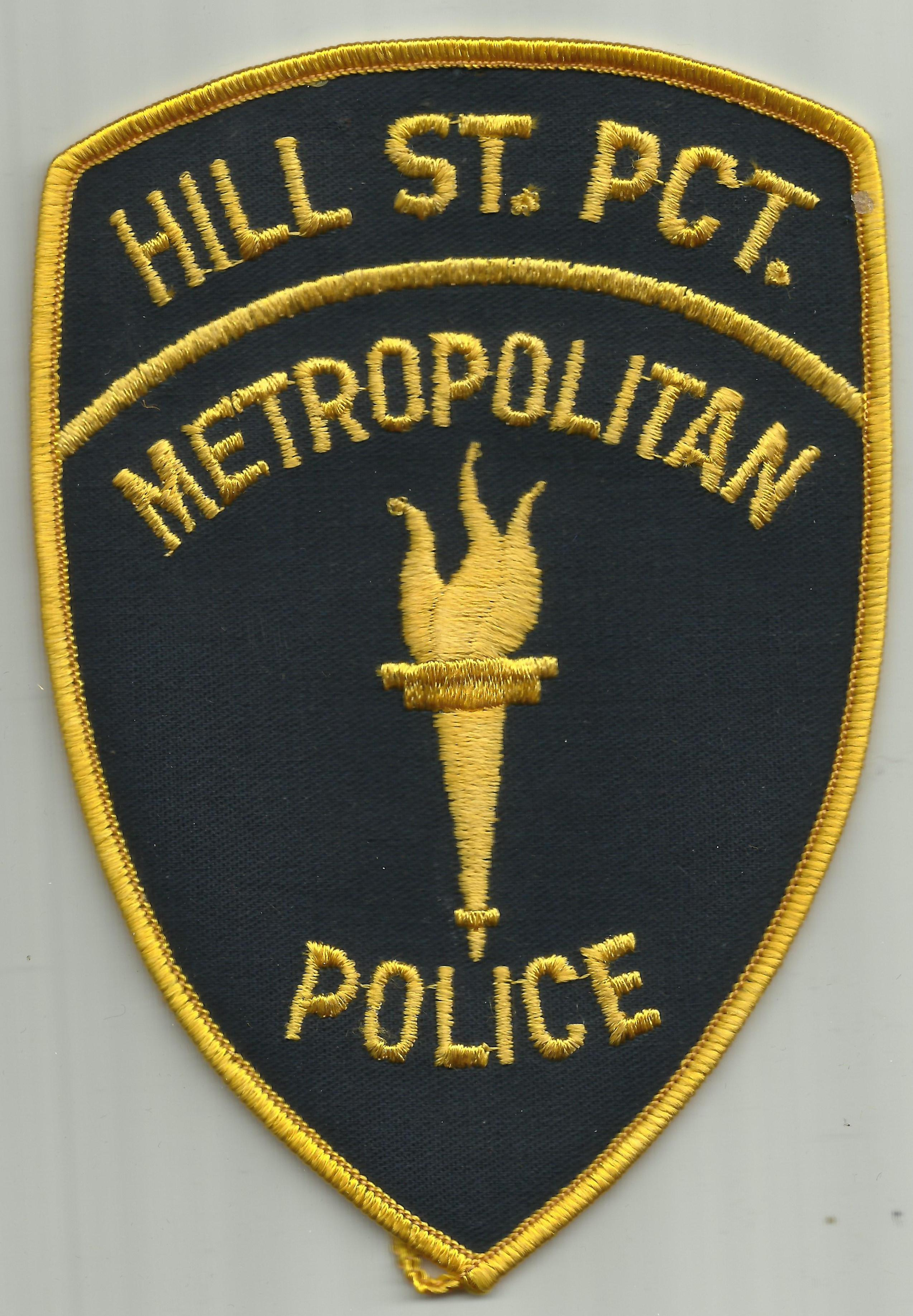
Shoulder patch of Hill Street Precinct officers (presumed reproduction)

Season	Timeslot	Ratings
1 (1980–1981)	Thursdays at 10:00 p.m. (January 15–22, 1981); Saturdays at 10:00 p.m. (January 17 – March 21, 1981); Tuesdays at 9:00 p.m. (May 19–26, 1981)	#87
2 (1981–1982)	Thursdays at 10:00 p.m.	#28
3 (1982–1983)	Thursdays at 10:00 p.m.	#23
4 (1983–1984)	Thursdays at 10:00 p.m.	#32
5 (1984–1985)	Thursdays at 10:00 p.m.	#27
6 (1985–1986)	Thursdays at 10:00 p.m.	#33
7 (1986–1987)	Thursdays at 10:00 p.m. (October 2 – November 27, 1986); Tuesdays at 9:00 p.m. (December 2, 1986 – February 10, 1987); Tuesdays at 10:00 p.m. (March 3 – May 12, 1987)	#42

The series later aired in reruns on TV Land, Bravo, AmericanLife TV, and NuvoTV. It ran for several years, from September 2015, on the Heroes & Icons network. The entire series could previously be viewed on Hulu and Amazon Prime Video. Season three can be viewed as streaming video on commercial sites and is also available in many countries from Channel 4 on YouTube.

== Setting ==
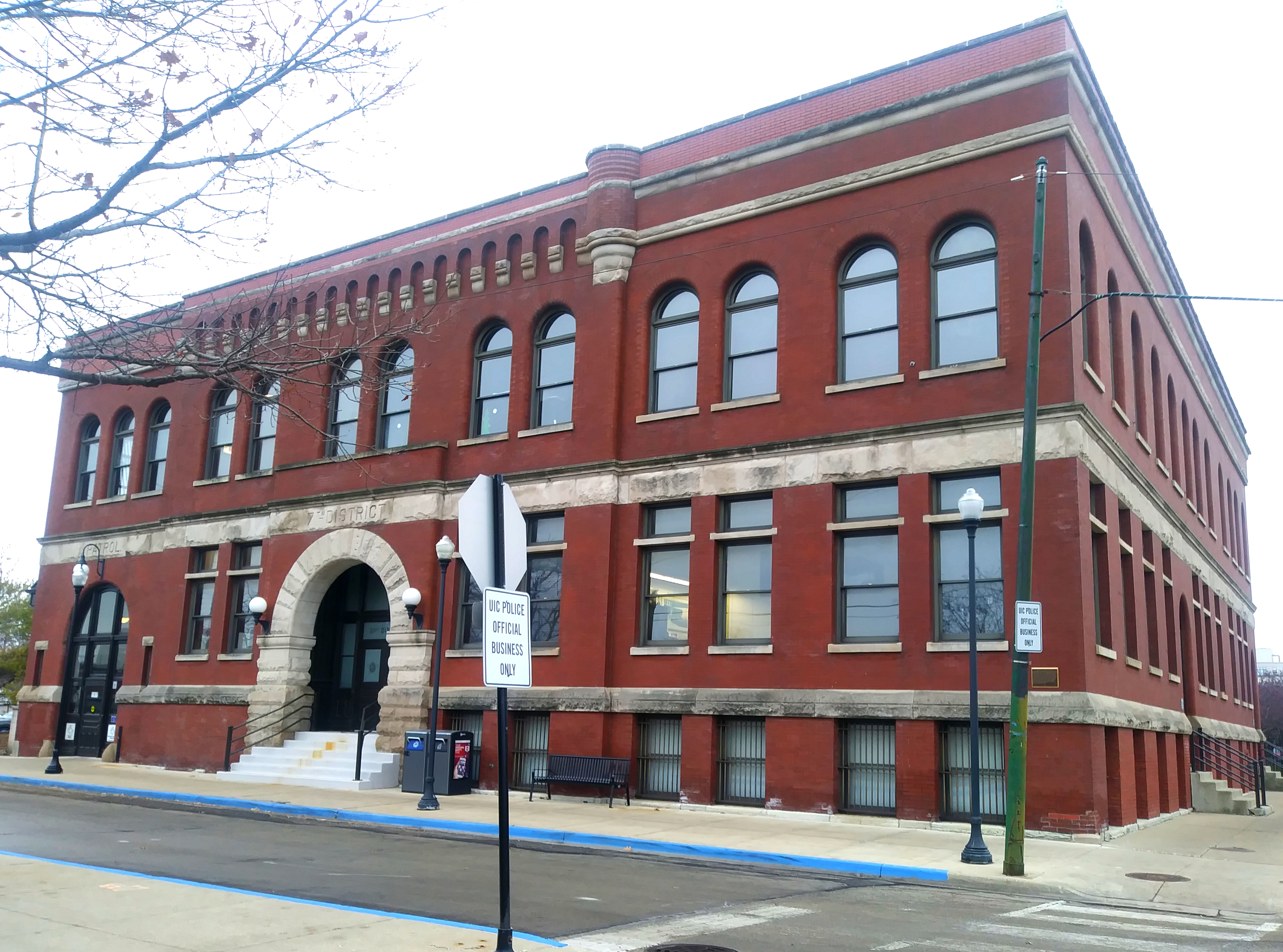
Chicago's 7th District Police Station, often shown on the show in cutaway shots

Series producers deliberately left the exact city in which the series was set vague and a variety of methods are employed to imply different general locations. The call letters of local TV stations were usually obscured to avoid showing whether they began with "W" (the Federal Communications Commission designation for stations east of the Mississippi River) or "K" (signifying a station west of the Mississippi River). An episode in season three specifically mentions a radio station of WDPD, suggesting a city east of the Mississippi. However, in bar scenes throughout the series, characters are frequently shown drinking bottles of beer that strongly resemble Coors Beer. Coors did not obtain national distribution until 1986, and as a result of national distribution laws was not available east of the Mississippi until that year, implying the location is west of the Mississippi.

Though most of the series' scenes were filmed in Los Angeles (on location and at CBS Studio Center in Studio City), the series' introduction shows exterior shots entirely of Chicago and cutaway shots from Chicago were used in production, with police cars resembling the color schemes of Chicago Police Department patrol vehicles. Chicago's 7th District Police Station is frequently shown in cutaway shots and also during the closing credits. This station was closed by the Chicago Police in 1998 and later repurposed as the headquarters for the University of Illinois at Chicago police.

The first episode of season three shows both a TV camera labeled "WREQ", and a shot of a Regional Transportation Authority suburban train arriving at the Chicago and North Western Terminal. However, in the penultimate episode of season 2, a street sign for Los Angeles Street – a thoroughfare in downtown Los Angeles – is visible outside the fictitious Hotel Doane.

There are several mentions through the series of characters going down to "the shore", which implies a lake or oceanfront setting. One indication of setting within the show was given by the Southern-accented character Officer Andy Renko when he stated in the season one episode "Politics as Usual": "Just drop that cowboy stuff. I was born in New Jersey, never been west of Chicago in my life", as if to imply that they were in Chicago. In Season 1 episode 12, Captain Furillo informs Lieutenant Hunter that the armored vehicle he was test driving has been found "in the East River", implying New York City. In Season 2, Episode 3, Sergeant Esterhaus references guarding "the national guard armory in Newark", implying a location in or near New Jersey. Season 2 episode 18 shows an elevated subway train on which the transit agency "CTA" can clearly be seen, suggesting Chicago. Throughout the series, characters occasionally mention well-known Chicago street names, such as Michigan Avenue, or other Chicago-related landmarks, such as the Blue Line subway and Mercy Hospital. Both of the characters played by Dennis Franz employ a heavy Chicago-type accent.

In a Season 5 episode, during an undercover detail, Detective Belker is knocked unconscious by a criminal and stashed in the luggage compartment of an interstate bus. A package labeled "Springfield ILL" (using the old three-letter Postal Service state abbreviation) is next to him. When he is finally freed from the compartment and told he is in Springfield, it is still daytime and after he rides a bus back to his origin, it is now early evening and the other detective at his detail is not alarmed when Belker explains his absence as "following a tail", implying the distance was not very great (Springfield is roughly a three-hour drive from Chicago via I-55).

The show also contains a few references to locations in Buffalo. In one episode, Lt. Hunter talks about needing to get rid of tickets for the "Sabres." Buffalo place names mentioned on the show include the Kubiak Lodge, Ganson St. and the canals, Gabriel's Gate bar, Decker St. and West Utica St.

Show writer Steven Bochco attended college at the Carnegie Institute of Technology (now Carnegie Mellon University) in Pittsburgh. The run-down, shabby, drug-ridden impression of Pittsburgh's Hill District that Bochco acquired was apparently part of the inspiration for the show. He intended the setting to resemble several cities, including Chicago, New York, Pittsburgh and Buffalo.

Although the city is never named, the Illinois state flag is visible over the judge's left shoulder in the courtroom scenes in the Season 2 episode "Fruits of the Poisonous Tree," suggesting that the location is Chicago. Some outdoor scenes, particularly in the first two seasons, capture palm trees and other Southern California flora not found in the Midwest or Northeastern United States.

While most vehicles sport generic, stateless license plates, 1980s-era California license plates are easily spotted on many large trucks used on set.

== Title ==
Hill Street Blues refers to the blue uniforms worn by many police officers in the United States and, by extension, the depressing nature of inner-city police work. The phrase is uttered only once in the series, apart from introductions such as "Previously on Hill Street Blues." It is spoken by Detective Emil Schneider (Dolph Sweet) in the first-season episode "Gator Bait." Schneider says it in a slightly mocking tone, in reference to officers Hill and Renko, who he feels are out of their league at a particular crime scene.

The precinct bowling team is the "Hill Street Blue Ballers."

== Cast ==
Hill Street Blues cast, circa 1986, left to right, from bottom: Taurean Blacque, Daniel J. Travanti, Michael Warren; second row: Betty Thomas, James B. Sikking; third row: Robert Clohessy, Dennis Franz, Kiel Martin, Joe Spano; top row: George Wyner, Peter Jurasik, Robert Prosky, Megan Gallagher

The ranks and titles held by the characters are listed below when pertinent; Some characters held more than one rank over the course of the series, and in those cases, both ranks are shown.

=== Main characters ===
- Capt. Francis Xavier "Frank" Furillo (Daniel J. Travanti, 1981–87)
- Sgt. Philip Freemason "Phil" Esterhaus (Michael Conrad, 1981–84)
- Ofc. Robert "Bobby" Hill (Michael Warren, 1981–87)
- Det. Michael "Mick" Belker (Bruce Weitz, 1981–87)
- Sgt./Lt. Howard Hunter (James B. Sikking, 1981–87)
- Sgt./Lt. Henry Goldblume (Joe Spano, 1981–87)
- Fay Furillo (Barbara Bosson, 1981–86)
- Det. Neal Washington (Taurean Blacque, 1981–87)
- Det. John D. "J.D." LaRue (Kiel Martin, 1981–87)
- Lt./Capt. Raymundo "Ray" Calletano (René Enríquez, 1981–86)
- Ofc./Sgt. Lucille "Lucy" Bates (Betty Thomas, 1981–87)
- Ofc. Andrew "Andy" Renko (Charles Haid, 1981–87)
- Joyce Davenport (Veronica Hamel, 1981–87)
- Ofc. Joe Coffey (Ed Marinaro, 1981–86)
- Sgt. Stanislaus "Stan" Jablonski (Robert Prosky, 1984–87)
- Det. Harry Garibaldi (Ken Olin, 1984–85)
- Det. Patricia "Patsy" Mayo (Mimi Kuzyk, 1984–85)
- Lt. Norman "Norm"/"Guido" Buntz (Dennis Franz, 1985–87)
- Ofc. Patrick Flaherty (Robert Clohessy, 1986–87)
- Ofc. Tina Russo (Megan Gallagher, 1986–87)

=== Other characters ===
- Chief Fletcher Daniels (Jon Cypher, 1981–87)
- Ofc. Leo Schnitz (Robert Hirschfeld, 1981–85, promoted to series regular in his final season)
- Grace Gardner (Barbara Babcock, 1981–85)
- Jesús Martinez (Trinidad Silva, 1981–87)
- Capt. Jerry Fuchs (Vincent Lucchesi, 1981–84)
- Det./Lt. Alf Chesley (Gerry Black, 1981–82)
- Attorney/Judge Alan Wachtel (Jeffrey Tambor, 1982–87)
- Mayor Ozzie Cleveland (J. A. Preston, 1982–85)
- Assistant D.A. Irwin Bernstein (George Wyner, 1982–87)
- Ofc. Robin Tattaglia Belker (Lisa Sutton, 1983–87)
- Det. Sal Benedetto (Dennis Franz, 1983. Franz later appeared as series regular Lt. Norman Buntz (see above)
- Celeste Patterson (Judith Hansen, 1985–86)
- Sid "The Snitch" Thurston (Peter Jurasik, 1985–87)
- Hector Ruiz (Panchito Gomez, 1981–85)
- Judge Lee Oberman (Larry D. Mann, 1983–85)
- "Buck Naked" flasher (Lee Weaver, 1981–87)
- Daryl Ann Renko (Deborah Richter, sometimes billed as Debi Richter, 1984–87)
- Chief Coroner Wally Nydorf (Pat Corley, 1981–1987)
- Shamrock Leader Tommy Mann (David Caruso, 1981–1983)
- Blood (Bobby Ellerbee, 1981–84)

=== Guest actors ===
Hill Street Blues featured many guest actors who were establishing careers in television and film. It also occasionally featured well-known character actors. Notable guest actors include:

- Terry Alexander
- James Avery
- Michael Ironside
- Jonathan Banks
- Michael Biehn
- Don Cheadle
- Vance Colvig
- Bryan Cranston
- James Cromwell
- Dennis Dugan
- Dominique Dunne
- Hector Elizondo
- Martin Ferrero
- Laurence Fishburne
- Jonathan Frakes
- Robin Gammell
- Lee Weaver
- Andy Garcia
- Paul Gleason
- Crispin Glover
- Danny Glover
- Cuba Gooding Jr.
- Linda Hamilton
- Dan Hedaya
- Penny Johnson Jerald
- Anne-Marie Johnson
- Jane Kaczmarek
- Stanley Kamel
- Terry Kiser
- Yaphet Kotto
- Michael Lerner
- Whitman Mayo
- Barney Martin
- Paul McCrane
- James McDaniel
- Frances McDormand
- Chuck Mitchell
- Chris Noth
- Edward James Olmos
- Chazz Palminteri
- Joe Pantoliano
- Felton Perry
- Joaquin Phoenix
- CCH Pounder
- Daphne Reid
- James Remar
- Michael Richards
- Ron Rifkin
- Tim Robbins
- Mimi Rogers
- Leo Rossi
- Saul Rubinek
- Joe Santos
- Dwight Schultz
- Helen Shaver
- Ally Sheedy
- Armin Shimerman
- Brent Spiner
- Dolph Sweet
- Joe E. Tata
- Lawrence Tierney
- Jennifer Tilly
- Meg Tilly
- James Tolkan
- George Wallace
- Tracey Walter
- Keenen Ivory Wayans
- Forest Whitaker
- John Witherspoon
- Alfre Woodard

== Critical reception ==
Initially, Hill Street Blues received rave reviews from critics but had dismal Nielsen ratings. Early schedule switching did not help; the show was broadcast once weekly on four different nights during its first season alone but gradually settled into a Thursday night time slot. The NBC Broadcast Standards Unit deemed it "too violent, too sexy, too grim." The producers described the show as "an hour drama with 13 continuing characters living through a Gordian knot of personal and professional relationships." In a May 1981 review, John J. O'Connor charted the show's growing popularity and called it "a comfortable balance between comedy and drama."

The choice to include African-Americans as mainstays in the core ensemble cast and to feature several interracial and interethnic cop partnerships drew notice and praise, as did the overlapping plots and examinations of moral conundrums such as police corruption, racism, alcoholism and both interpersonal and institutional forgiveness.

The show was very influential, with many others imitating its use of handheld cameras, ensemble casts, and multiple overlapping story lines lasting for several episodes, set in urban decay. Alan Sepinwall wrote in 2014 that it "is on the short list of the most influential TV shows ever made. Whether through shared actors, writers, directors or through stylistic and thematic complexity, its DNA can be found in nearly every great drama produced in the 30-plus years since it debuted." He compared Hill Street Blues to Casablanca, which was so influential on other films that "if you come to see it for the first time after a lifetime of watching the copies, it could be at risk of playing like a bundle of clichés—even though it invented those clichés."

In 1993, TV Guide named the series its All-Time Best Cop Show in an issue celebrating 40 years of television. In 1997, the episode "Grace Under Pressure" was ranked number 49 on TV Guide's 100 Greatest Episodes of All Time. When the list was revised in 2009, "Freedom's Last Stand" was ranked number 57. In 1998, Entertainment Weekly named it in the top 20 television shows of all time, saying it "...took the cop show and turned it upside down". In 2002, Hill Street Blues ranked number 14 on TV Guide's 50 Greatest TV Shows of All Time, and in 2013 TV Guide ranked it #1 in its list of the 60 Greatest Dramas of All Time and #23 of the 60 Best Series. Also in 2013, the Writers Guild of America ranked it #15 on their list of the 101 Best Written TV Series.

=== Awards ===
- The show shares the record for Primetime Emmy Award for Outstanding Drama Series wins (4, 1981–84) with Mad Men (2008–11), L.A. Law (1987, 1989–91), Game of Thrones (2015–16, 2018–19) and The West Wing (2000–03).
- It has been nominated for the most Primetime Emmy Award for Outstanding Supporting Actor in a Drama Series (16) and Primetime Emmy Award for Outstanding Supporting Actress in a Drama Series (13).
- The series set the Emmy Award record for most acting nominations by regular cast members (excluding the guest performer category) for a single series in one year, later matched by L.A. Law and The West Wing. At the 34th Primetime Emmy Awards, for the 1981–82 season, nine cast members were nominated for Emmys. Daniel J. Travanti and Michael Conrad were the only ones to win (for Lead Actor and Supporting Actor respectively). The others nominated were Veronica Hamel (for Lead Actress), Taurean Blacque, Michael Warren, Bruce Weitz, and Charles Haid (for Supporting Actor), and Barbara Bosson and Betty Thomas (for Supporting Actress).
- At the 34th Primetime Emmy Awards, for the only time in Emmy Award history, all five nominees in an acting category (in this case, Outstanding Supporting Actor in a Drama Series) were from a single series.
- The pilot episode, "Hill Street Station," was awarded an Edgar Award for Best Teleplay from a Series.
- "Hill Street Station" is the only episode in television history to have won the two major best director (Primetime Emmy Award for Outstanding Directing for a Drama Series and Directors Guild of America Award for Outstanding Directing – Drama Series) and the two major best writer awards (Primetime Emmy Award for Outstanding Writing for a Drama Series and Writers Guild of America Award for Television: Episodic Drama).
- Over its seven seasons, the show won 24 Emmy Awards from 96 nominations, an average of 14 nominations per year.
- Betty Thomas was the sole cast member nominated in every season and the only one to be nominated in the last season.
- In 1997, the episode "Grace Under Pressure" was ranked number 49 on TV Guide's 100 Greatest Episodes of All Time. When the list was revised in 2009, "Freedom's Last Stand" was ranked number 57.
- In 2007, Channel 4 (UK) ranked Hill Street Blues No. 19 on their list of the "50 Greatest TV Dramas."

== Home media ==
20th Century Fox released the first two seasons of Hill Street Blues on DVD in Region 1 in 2006. Both releases contain special features including gag reel, deleted scenes, commentary tracks and featurettes.

On December 5, 2013, Shout! Factory announced its acquisition of the rights to the series in Region 1, releasing Hill Street Blues: The Complete Series on DVD on April 29, 2014. In late 2014, Shout! began releasing single-season sets.

In Region 2, Channel 4 DVD released the first two seasons on DVD in the UK in 2006.

In Region 4, Shock Records released the first three seasons on DVD in Australia on December 4, 2013, and the remaining four seasons on April 30, 2014.

On December 4, 2013, Shock Records also released a complete series set.

Season	Episodes	Release date		
Season	Episodes	Region 1	Region 2	Region 4
The Complete 1st Season	17	January 31, 2006	March 25, 2013	December 4, 2013
The Complete 2nd Season	18	May 16, 2006	March 25, 2013	December 4, 2013
The Complete 3rd Season	22	November 4, 2014	–	December 4, 2013
The Complete 4th Season	22	March 3, 2015	–	April 30, 2014
The Complete 5th Season	23	May 26, 2015	–	April 30, 2014
The Complete 6th Season	22	September 8, 2015	–	April 30, 2014
The Complete 7th Season	22	January 12, 2016	–	April 30, 2014
The Complete Series	146	April 29, 2014	–	December 4, 2013

== Spin-off ==
=== Beverly Hills Buntz ===
Beverly Hills Buntz aired on NBC from November 5, 1987, to April 22, 1988. It was a half-hour comedy, a hybrid between light private eye fare and a sitcom. Main character Norman Buntz (Dennis Franz) quits Hill Street, moves to Beverly Hills with Sid "The Snitch" Thurston (Peter Jurasik) and becomes a private investigator. Thirteen episodes were filmed, though only nine were broadcast.

== In popular culture ==
Hill Street Blues has inspired parodies, storylines, characters, and cultural references in numerous media vehicles.

- Second City Television - In 1981, the Canadian comedy series SCTV created a parody skit, 'The Benny Hill Street Blues,' a cross between The Benny Hill Show and Hill Street Blues.
- The Simpsons episode "The Springfield Connection" (S6E23), in which Marge becomes a cop, uses and ends with a mix of The Simpsons and Hill Street Blues themes.
- Spider-Man and His Amazing Friends episode "The X-Men Adventure" (S3E7), in which Spider-Man says to the heroes who are about to separate to search for Cyberiad, "Let's be careful out there."
- Issue 60 of Firestorm, published by DC Comics in 1987, featured thinly veiled references to Hill Street Blues characters in a story taking place in a police precinct.
- Southern rock band 38 Special's music video for "Back Where You Belong" stars the band members as bumbling plainclothes police officers pursuing a female suspect. An affectionate homage to Hill Street Blues, the video begins with a morning rollcall scene in which a police sergeant implores the band members to "be extra careful out there today."
- Black Flag mentions the show in their song "TV Party" on their satirical eponymous EP TV Party.
- British band The French covered the theme song in a BBC Radio 1 Maida Vale session for John Peel in 2004, a re-recorded version was released by Darren Hayman and the Audio Antihero label in September 2026.

=== Video game ===
In 1991, Krisalis Software released the video game Hill Street Blues for Amiga, Atari ST and MS-DOS. It puts the player in charge of Hill Street Station and its surrounding neighborhood with the aim of promptly dispatching officers to reported crimes, apprehending criminals, and making them testify at court. If certain areas have less serious crimes unresolved, such as bag snatching, they soon escalate to more serious ones, such as murder in broad daylight. The game received mixed reviews.
