= Arvella Gray =

American blues, folk and gospel singer and guitarist (1906–1980)

- Also known as: Blind Arvella Gray
- Born: James Dixon; January 28, 1906; Somerville, Texas
- Died: September 7, 1980 (aged 74) Chicago, Illinois
- Genres: Blues, Folk and Gospel
- Occupation: Musician
- Instrument: Guitar

Blind Arvella Gray (January 28, 1906 – September 7, 1980) was an American blues, folk and gospel singer and guitarist.

Gray was born James Dixon, in Somerville, Texas. He spent the latter part of his life performing and busking folk, blues and gospel music at Chicago's Maxwell Street flea market and at rapid-transit depots. In the 1960s, he recorded two singles for his own Gray label, including "Freedom Rider" backed with "Freedom Bus."

Gray's only album, The Singing Drifter (1973), was reissued on the Conjuroo record label in 2005. The reissue was produced by Cary Baker, who wrote the liner notes for the original vinyl LP, released by Birch Records.

Gray died in Chicago, Illinois, in September 1980, at the age of 74. In 2016 the Killer Blues Headstone Project placed the headstone for Arvella Gray at Restvale Cemetery in Alsip, Illinois.
