= Hot Flash (album) =

Studio album by Saffire – The Uppity Blues Women
- Released: 1991
- Studio: Streeterville
- Genre: Blues
- Length: 54:31
- Label: Alligator
- Producers: Saffire, Bruce Iglauer

Saffire – The Uppity Blues Women chronology
Uppity Blues Women (1990)	Hot Flash (1991)	Broad Casting (1992)

Hot Flash is an album by the American musical trio Saffire – The Uppity Blues Women, released in 1991. It was their second album for Alligator Records and one of the label's best selling titles. The trio supported the album with a North American tour. Hot Flash also served as the title of a 2008 documentary about the trio.

== Production ==
Most of the songs were written by the trio, with Gaye Adegbalola penning the more humorous ones. Billy Branch contributed on harmonica. "Sloppy Drunk" is a cover of the Lucille Bogan song. "Why Don't You Do Right?" is a version of the song made famous by Lil Green. "(No Need) Pissin' on a Skunk" lambasts a coworker. "Dirty Sheets" is about the longings of women working in nursing homes and hotels. "Torch Song #1 / Torch Song #2" is addressed to a dying friend.

== Critical reception ==
Professional ratings
Review scores
Source	Rating
AllMusic	4/5 stars
Calgary Herald	B+
Chicago Tribune	3/4 stars
Robert Christgau	(2-star Honorable Mention)
MusicHound Blues: The Essential Album Guide	3/5 stars
North County Blade-Citizen	2.5/4 stars
The Penguin Guide to Blues Recordings	3/4 stars
The Philadelphia Inquirer	3/4 stars

The Washington Post determined that "when the trio fails, it merely pushes the same naughty buttons it pushed last time around—buttons that, incidentally, work far better in concert than they do on record." The Calgary Herald called the album "a roadhouse mentality urban blues collection." The New York Times wrote that "Saffire's raunchy blues extol the virtues of gratifying sex, nights on the town and the benefits of nonmonogamous relationships; the group's songs are laced with double-entendres and bawdy language." The Pittsburgh Press noted that "the blues are usually not offered in such fine harmonies."

AllMusic wrote: "Racy and sassy—and to some tastes cutesy—the album is a fun, free-thinking update of classic female blues, performed with gusto and verve."

== Track listing ==
No.	Title	Writer(s)	Length
1.	"Two in the Bush Is Better Than One in the Hand"	Gaye Adegbalola	3:13
2.	"Sloppy Drunk"	Lucille Bogan	3:07
3.	"One Good Man"	Connie Bryson	2:37
4.	"Dirty Sheets"	Gaye Adegbalola	4:12
5.	"Tom Cat Blues"	Ann Rabson	2:47
6.	"Learn to Settle for Less"	Gaye Adegbalola	4:32
7.	"You'll Never Get Me Out of Your Mind"	Ann Rabson	3:12
8.	"(Mr. Insurance Man) Take Out That Thing"	Cliff Edwards	3:52
9.	"Hopin' It'll Be Alright"	Ann Rabson	3:33
10.	"A Little Bit of Your Loving Goes a Very Long Way"	Gaye Adegbalola	3:01
11.	"Shopping for Love"	Bill Caswell; Glen A. Arlen Clark	3:32
12.	"Elevator Man"	Ann Rabson	3:13
13.	"Torch Song #1 / Torch Song #2"	Gaye Adegbalola	4:18
14.	"Why Don't You Do Right?"	Wilbur Joe McCoy	2:40
15.	"Prove Me Wrong"	Ann Rabson	3:02
16.	"(No Need) Pissin' on a Skunk"	Gaye Adegbalola	3:40
Total length:			54:31
