= Live – Spontaneous Combustion =

Live album by Son Seals
- Released: 1996
- Genre: Blues
- Label: Alligator
- Producer: Bruce Iglauer

Son Seals chronology
Nothing but the Truth (1994)	Live – Spontaneous Combustion (1996)	Nothing but the Truth (2000)

Live – Spontaneous Combustion was the second live album (and eighth album overall) released by Son Seals. It was recorded June 20–22, 1996 at Buddy Guy's Legends in Chicago, Illinois, and was produced by Son Seals and Bruce Iglauer.

Professional ratings
Review scores
Source	Rating
The Penguin Guide to Blues Recordings	3/4 stars

== Track listing ==
1. "Crying For My Baby" – 4:33
2. "Don't Pick Me For Your Fool" – 5:00
3. "Mother Blues" – 6:28
4. "No, No Baby" – 4:12
5. "Your Love Is Like A Cancer" – 6:04
6. "I Need My Baby Back" – 4:10
7. "Sitting Here Thinking" – 6:23
8. "Every Goodbye Ain't Gone" – 4:19
9. "The Sun Is Shining" – 6:08
10. "Landlord At My Door" – 5:27
11. "Trouble, Trouble" – 4:47
12. "Don't Lie To Me" – 4:58
13. "Tricks Of The Trade" – 4:41
