= Queen of the Blues =

Studio album by Koko Taylor
- Released: 1985
- Genre: Chicago blues, blues
- Label: Alligator
- Producer: Koko Taylor, Criss Johnson, Bruce Iglauer

Koko Taylor chronology
From the Heart of a Woman (1981)	Queen of the Blues (1985)	Live in Chicago: An Audience With the Queen (1987)

Queen of the Blues is an album by the American blues singer Koko Taylor, released in 1985.

The album was nominated for a Grammy Award for "Best Traditional Blues Recording".

== Production ==
The album was produced by Taylor, Criss Johnson, and Bruce Iglauer. Taylor used her Blues Machine Band on the album, with guest turns by Son Seals, Albert Collins, Lonnie Brooks, and James Cotton. "Flamin' Mamie" was written by Willie Dixon.

== Critical reception ==
Professional ratings
Review scores
Source	Rating
AllMusic	4/5 stars
Robert Christgau	B+
The Encyclopedia of Popular Music	3/5 stars
MusicHound R&B: The Essential Album Guide	3/5 stars
The Penguin Guide to Blues Recordings	3/4 stars
The Philadelphia Inquirer	3/4 stars

The Philadelphia Inquirer deemed the album "tough, shouted blues by one of the genre's most vehement practitioners." The Kingston Whig-Standard thought that Taylor "comes across as a gruff earth mother," and noted that her guitar player, Criss Johnson, "more than holds his own on his solos" despite the many famous guest musicians.

The New York Times wrote that Taylor's "penetrating growl is menacing on the Willie Dixon stomp 'Evil', and self-assured on 'The Hunter'." The Columbus Dispatch concluded that "Taylor is in superb form, belting out ballads about passion, slow blues about broken hearts and barroom romance rockers."

AllMusic said that "Taylor's gritty 'I Cried like a Baby' and a snazzy remake of Ann Peebles' 'Come to Mama' are among the many highlights."

== Track listing ==
No.	Title	Length
1.	"Evil"
2.	"Beer Bottle Boogie"
3.	"I Cried Like a Baby"
4.	"I Can Love You Like a Woman (Or I Can Fight You Like a Man)"
5.	"Flamin' Mamie"
6.	"Something Inside Me"
7.	"The Hunter"
8.	"Queen Bee"
9.	"I Don't Care No More"
10.	"Come to Mama"
