= In the Shadow of the City =

Studio album by Maurice John Vaughn
- Released: 1993
- Genre: Blues, funk
- Label: Alligator
- Producer: Maurice John Vaughn

Maurice John Vaughn chronology
I Got Money (1986)	In the Shadow of the City (1993)	Dangerous Road (2001)

In the Shadow of the City is an album by the American musician Maurice John Vaughn, released in 1993. Vaughn supported the album with a North American tour. "(Everything I Do) Got to Be Funky", which was a minor, regional radio hit, appears on the soundtrack to Major League II.

== Production ==
Vaughn started working on the album in 1990. The song selection was the result of a compromise between Vaughn and label head Bruce Iglauer. Vaughn sang and played guitar and saxophone on the album.

== Critical reception ==
Professional ratings
Review scores
Source	Rating
AllMusic	4/5 stars
The Penguin Guide to Blues Recordings	2.5/4 stars

The Chicago Reader praised the "brooding urban funk of 'Blood Red Sky'." The Rocky Mountain News wrote that Vaughn's "superior songwriting and playing mark him as a blues force to be reckoned with." The Wisconsin State Journal stated that "Vaughn's style is a special blend of funky urban blues steeped in the tradition of Muddy Waters and Howling Wolf."

The Denver Post called the songs "laid-back, funk-influenced and rueful." The Houston Chronicle labeled Vaughn "a modern Chicago bluesman who mixes in healthy portions of funk and soul." The Salt Lake Tribune noted the "powerful, sometimes humorous songs."

AllMusic wrote that Vaughn "spreads his stylistic wings considerably further than he did on his debut, embracing funk more fully than his first time around but offering enough tasty contemporary blues to keep everyone happy."

== Track listing ==
No.	Title	Length
1.	"Can't Nobody"
2.	"I Want to Be Your Spy"
3.	"(Everything I Do) Got to Be Funky"
4.	"Blood Red Sky"
5.	"Game Over"
6.	"Love Bone"
7.	"Treat Me So Bad"
8.	"Watching Your Watch"
9.	"Eager Beaver"
10.	"Are You Satisfied?"
11.	"Suicide Is Not the Way"
12.	"Small Town Baby"
