= Lacy Gibson =

American Chicago blues guitarist, singer and songwriter (1936–2011)

- Born: May 1, 1936; Salisbury, North Carolina, United States
- Died: April 11, 2011 (aged 74) Chicago, Illinois, United States
- Genres: Chicago blues, electric blues
- Occupations: Guitarist, singer, songwriter
- Instruments: Guitar, vocals
- Years active: Early 1960s–mid-2000s
- Labels: El Saturn, Delmark, Black Magic

Lacy Gibson (May 1, 1936 – April 11, 2011) was an American Chicago blues guitarist, singer and songwriter. He notably recorded the songs "My Love Is Real" and "Switchy Titchy" and in a long and varied career worked with Buddy Guy and Son Seals.

One commentator noted that Gibson "developed a large and varied repertoire after long stays with numerous bands, many recording sessions, and performances in Chicago nightclubs".

== Biography ==
Gibson was born in Salisbury, North Carolina, and relocated with his family to Chicago in 1949. His mother gave him his first lessons in playing the guitar.

His early influences included Sunnyland Slim, Muddy Waters, Lefty Bates, Matt Murphy, and Wayne Bennett. Gibson's earliest work was as a session musician, playing mainly rhythm guitar. In 1963 alone, he recorded backing for Willie Mabon, Billy "The Kid" Emerson and Buddy Guy.

Gibson's own recording debut was also in 1963, with Chess Records, which recorded his song "My Love Is Real", with Buddy Guy on guitar. The track remained unreleased at that time, and when it was finally issued, initial pressings credited the work to Guy. Two self-released singles followed. Gibson recorded his debut album, Wishing Ring, in 1971. It was released by El Saturn Records, which was partly owned by the musician Sun Ra, who was then Gibson's brother-in-law. The family connection continued when Ra recorded a song co-written by Gibson, "I'm Gonna Unmask the Batman". In the 1970s, Gibson also played alongside Willie James Lyons at the Poinciana on Chicago's West Side.

In 1977, Ralph Bass produced another album for Gibson, but it was not released until 1996, when it was issued by Delmark Records. He played on Son Seals's 1978 album Live and Burning. Alligator Records included four tracks by Gibson on its 1980 compilation album Living Chicago Blues, Vol. 3.

Gibson's album Switchy Titchy was released in 1982 by Black Magic Records, a Dutch label. His appearances after the release were constrained by health problems, but he performed around Chicago, on his own or backing Billy Boy Arnold and Big Time Sarah. Gibson played at the Chicago Blues Festival in 2004. He also operated the Chicago after-hours nightclub Ann's Love Nest with his wife, for whom it was named.

Gibson died of a heart attack in Chicago on April 11, 2011, aged 74.

== Discography ==
Year	Title	Record label
1971	Wishing Ring	El Saturn Records
1980	Living Chicago Blues, Vol. 3	Alligator Records
1982	Switchy Titchy	Black Magic Records
1996	Crying for My Baby	Delmark Records

== See also ==
- List of Chicago blues musicians
- List of electric blues musicians
