= I Smell Smoke =

Studio album by Michael Burks
- Released: 2003
- Studio: Ardent
- Genre: Blues
- Label: Alligator
- Producer: Michael Burks, Bruce Iglauer, Jim Gaines

Michael Burks chronology
Make It Rain (2001)	I Smell Smoke (2003)	Iron Man (2008)

I Smell Smoke is an album by the American musician Michael Burks, released in 2003. It was his second album for Alligator Records. I Smell Smoke peaked at No. 12 on Billboard's Top Blues Albums chart. Burks supported it with a North American tour. I Smell Smoke was nominated for a W. C. Handy Award for best "Contemporary Blues Album".

== Production ==
Recorded at Ardent Studios, in Memphis, the album was produced by Burks, Bruce Iglauer, and Jim Gaines. The son of a blues musician, Burks was told "the right way to play" guitar by family friends such as Albert Collins and Freddie King. Burks felt that emotional conviction was more important than guitar technique, and would often work out the songs in a darkened room. It was also important to Burks that the music remain more in a blues idiom than blues rock. "Let the Door Knob Hit You" is a cover of the Latimore song.

== Critical reception ==
Professional ratings
Review scores
Source	Rating
AllMusic	4/5 stars
Fort Worth Star-Telegram	B−
The Penguin Guide to Blues Recordings	3/4 stars

The Charleston Daily Mail wrote that "Burks takes his blues roots and channels them into a stinging blend of soul and R&B with some Santana-esque overtones." The Age noted that, "buried deep in Michael Burks' soul are the relics of Stax Records' heady early-'70s period, when Albert King was riding high with his Gibson Flying V guitar." The Tallahassee Democrat said that "Burks' deep, soulful voice is the perfect counterpoint to the music's smoldering sound." The Fort Worth Star-Telegram concluded that "the songs are better this time around."

AllMusic wrote that, "with a tone sounding at times like Eric Clapton's psychedelic work in Cream and a rugged four-piece band supporting him, this is a tough, uncompromising contemporary blues/blues-rock/R&B album that doesn't pull punches."

== Track listing ==
No.	Title	Length
1.	"All Your Affection Is Gone"
2.	"One More Chance"
3.	"I Smell Smoke"
4.	"Time I Came In Out of the Rain"
5.	"Hard Love"
6.	"Miss Mercy"
7.	"Let the Door Knob Hit You"
8.	"Lie to Me"
9.	"Willing to Crawl"
10.	"I Hope He's Worth My Pain"
11.	"Good Man, Bad Thing"
12.	"Snake Eggs"
