= Living in the Danger Zone =

Studio album by Son Seals
- Released: 1991
- Genre: Blues
- Label: Alligator
- Producer: Son Seals, Bruce Iglauer

Son Seals chronology
Bad Axe (1984)	Living in the Danger Zone (1991)	Nothing But the Truth (1994)

Living in the Danger Zone is a studio album by the blues musician Son Seals, released via Alligator Records in 1991.

== Production ==
The album was produced by Seals and Bruce Iglauer. It was made using Seals regulars and studio musicians, and marked a reconciliation between Seals and Iglauer; Seals had thought that Iglauer was paying more attention to his other artists.

== Critical reception ==
Professional ratings
Review scores
Source	Rating
AllMusic	3/5 stars
Calgary Herald	B+
The Encyclopedia of Popular Music	3/5 stars
The Penguin Guide to Blues Recordings	2.5/4 stars
The Rolling Stone Album Guide	3.5/5 stars

The Chicago Tribune wrote that the album "emphasizes uptempo funky blues, with the occasional classic Chicago shuffle and mid-tempo, minor-key tune for variety." The Washington Post called the album "impressive," writing that Seals "powerfully recites a litany of sorrows against a backdrop of jackhammer drums, organ and occasional horns, playing blistering guitar lines to express what the lyrics can't." The New York Times wrote that "Seals tears into ... the losing-streak lament 'I Can't Lose the Blues' and 'Tell It to Another Fool', a bitter declaration of independence from heartache, with convincing autobiographical zeal, singing with gruff exuberance and unleashing steely outbursts of impassioned, stabbing guitar."

AllMusic wrote that "the self-pitying ballad closer 'My Life' is the worst thing Seals has ever put on tape for Alligator."

== Track listing ==
1. "Frigidaire Woman" – 5:07
2. "I Can't Lose the Blues" – 4:28
3. "Woman In Black" – 3:10
4. "Tell It to Another Fool" – 4:17
5. "Ain't That Some Shame" – 3:38
6. "Arkansas Woman" – 4:29
7. "The Danger Zone" – 5:04
8. "Last Four Nickels" – 4:17
9. "My Time Now" – 6:05
10. "Bad Axe" – 3:12
11. "My Life" – 8:07
