= Deluxe Edition (Son Seals album) =

Compilation album by Son Seals
- Released: 2002
- Genre: Blues
- Label: Alligator

Deluxe Edition is a 2002 compilation album of recordings by Son Seals for Alligator Records. It was produced by Seals and Bruce Iglauer, except as noted.

The Penguin Guide to Blues Recordings describes the album as a “discriminating” selection from Seals's Alligator albums, with an additional track from an early session being better than some of those issued at the time.

Professional ratings
Review scores
Source	Rating
The Penguin Guide to Blues Recordings	3/4 stars

== Track listing ==
1. "I Believe To My Soul" - 4:14 (produced by: Son Seals, Bruce Iglauer, and Richard McLeese)
2. "Going Home" - 3:49
3. "Bad Axe" - 3:13
4. "Don't Pick Me For Your Fool" - 5:01
5. "Buzzard Luck" - 5:04
6. "Telephone Angel (You're On My Mind)" - 5:26 (produced by: Son Seals, Bruce Iglauer, and Richard McLeese)
7. "Life All By Myself" - 3:44
8. "Your Love Is Like a Cancer" - 4:35
9. "Landlord at My Door" - 4:26
10. "Now That I'm Down" - 6:01
11. "I Can't Hold Out" - 4:18 (produced by: Son Seals, Bruce Iglauer, and Richard McLeese)
12. "Before the Bullets Fly" - 3:54
13. "(I Need) a Good Woman Bad" - 4:38
14. "Funky Bitch" - 3:47 (produced by: Son Seals, Bruce Iglauer, and Richard McLeese)
15. "Hot Sauce" - 2:54 (produced by: Son Seals, Bruce Iglauer, and Richard McLeese)
