= From the Heart of a Woman =

Studio album by Koko Taylor
- Released: 1981
- Genre: Blues, Chicago blues
- Length: 38:49
- Label: Alligator
- Producer: Koko Taylor, Bruce Iglauer

Koko Taylor chronology
The Earthshaker (1978)	From the Heart of a Woman (1981)	Queen of the Blues (1985)

From the Heart of a Woman is a blues album by Koko Taylor, released in 1981 by Alligator Records.

== Critical reception ==
Professional ratings
Review scores
Source	Rating
AllMusic	3/5 stars
The Encyclopedia of Popular Music	3/5 stars
The Penguin Guide to Blues Recordings	3/4 stars

The New York Times wrote: "A highlight is Miss Taylor's gritty but swinging version of the Dinah Washington evergreen 'Blow Top Blues', which contrasts nicely with several performances in a more typically hard-edged Chicago vein."

== Track listing ==
1. "Something Strange Is Going On" (McQueen, Edwin Williams) – 4:01
2. "I'd Rather Go Blind" (Billy Foster, Ellington Jordan) – 4:57
3. "Keep Your Hands Off Him" (Priscilla Bowman, Jay McShann) – 3:49
4. "Thanks, But No Thanks" (Edwin Williams) – 4:14
5. "If You Got a Heartache" (Deadric Malone, Joe Scott) – 3:42
6. "Never Trust a Man" (Edwin Williams) – 3:18
7. "Sure Had a Wonderful Time Last Night" (Louis Jordan) – 3:05
8. "Blow Top Blues" (Leonard Feather) – 4:15
9. "If Walls Could Talk" (Bobby Miller) – 3:30
10. "It Took a Long Time" (Koko Taylor) – 3:58

== Personnel ==
- Koko Taylor – vocals
- Vino Louden – bandleader, lead guitar
- Criss Johnson – guitar
- Sammy Lawhorn – guitar
- Cornelius Boyson – bass
- Bill Heid – keyboards
- Vince Chappelle – drums
- Doug Bartenfeld – keyboards, guitar
- Billy Branch – harmonica
- A.C. Reed – tenor saxophone
