= Earthshaker =

Earthshaker may refer to:

Poseidon, a god in Greek mythology.

In music:

- Earthshaker (album), an album by Y&T
- The Earthshaker, an album by Koko Taylor
- Earthshaker (band), a Japanese metal band

In games:

- Earthshaker!, an accessory for the Dungeons & Dragons role-playing game
- Earthshaker! (pinball), a pinball machine
