= Chicago Fire =

Chicago Fire may refer to:

- Great Chicago Fire, the fire that burned much of Chicago in 1871
- Iroquois Theatre fire, a deadly fire at a downtown theater in 1903
- Chicago Fire FC, a Major League Soccer club
  - Chicago Fire Premier, part of the development system for the Chicago Fire FC
  - Chicago Fire NPSL, part of the development system for the Chicago Fire FC
  - Chicago Fire Juniors, youth club affiliate of the Chicago Fire FC
- Chicago Fire (WFL), an American football team in the defunct World Football League
- Chicago Fire Department
- Chicago Fire (TV series), an American drama series on NBC
- Chicago Fire (AFA), an American football team in the defunct American Football Association

== Music ==
- Chicago Fire (Son Seals album), 1980
- Chicago Fire (Eric Alexander album), 2013
