= Lettin' Go =

Lettin' Go may refer to:

- Lettin' Go (song), a song byJanelle Monáe
- Lettin' Go (album), an album by Son Seals
