= Midnight Son (album) =

Studio album by Son Seals
- Released: 1976
- Label: Alligator Records
- Producer: Son Seals, Bruce Iglauer, Richard McLeese

Son Seals chronology
The Son Seals Blues Band (1973)	Midnight Son (1976)	Live and Burning (1978)

Professional ratings
Review scores
Source	Rating
AllMusic	4.5/5 stars
Christgau's Record Guide	A−
The Encyclopedia of Popular Music	4/5 stars
The Penguin Guide to Blues Recordings	3.5/4 stars
The Rolling Stone Album Guide	4/5 stars

Midnight Son is the second studio album by Son Seals, released by Alligator Records in 1976. It was produced by Son Seals, Bruce Iglauer, and Richard McLeese.

== Critical reception ==
AllMusic wrote that "the addition of a brisk horn section enhanced [Seal's] staccato guitar attack and uncompromising vocals."

== Track listing ==
1. "I Believe" – 4:15
2. "No, No Baby" – 4:30
3. "Four Full Seasons of Love" – 2:50
4. "Telephone Angel" – 5:27
5. "Don't Bother Me" – 3:52
6. "On My Knees" – 4:59
7. "Don't Fool with My Baby" – 3:04
8. "Strung Out Woman" – 3:45
9. "Going Back Home" – 7:04

== Personnel ==
- Son Seals – guitar, vocals
- Steve Plair – guitar
- Harry Mitchum – bass
- Bert Robinson – drums
- Alberto Gianquinto – keyboards
- Bill McFarland – trombone
- Kenneth Cooper – trumpet
