= Long John Hunter =

American blues guitarist and singer

- Born: John Thurman Hunter Jr. July 13, 1931; Ringgold, Louisiana, U.S.
- Died: January 4, 2016 (aged 84) Phoenix, Arizona, U.S.
- Genres: Texas blues, electric blues
- Occupation(s): Guitarist, singer, songwriter
- Instrument(s): Guitar, vocals
- Years active: 1953–2011
- Labels: Alligator, various

John Thurman Hunter Jr. (July 13, 1931 – January 4, 2016), known by the stage name Long John Hunter, was an American Texas blues and electric blues guitarist, singer and songwriter. He released seven albums in his own name, and in his later years found critical acknowledgement outside of his homeland. Hunter's best known tracks are "El Paso Rock" and "Alligators Around My Door", the latter of which Hunter co-wrote with Bruce Iglauer.

== Life and career ==
Hunter was born in Ringgold, Louisiana. He was raised on a farm in Magnolia, Arkansas, but by his early twenties was working in a box factory in Beaumont, Texas. He bought his first guitar after attending a B. B. King concert. He adopted the stage name Long John Hunter in 1953. His first single, "She Used to Be My Woman" backed with "Crazy Girl" was released by Duke Records in 1953. By 1957, he had relocated to El Paso, Texas, and found employment playing at the Lobby Club in Juárez, Mexico. He remained there for over thirteen years, releasing several singles in the early 1960s on local record labels. These tracks included one of his most notable numbers, "El Paso Rock".

His album Texas Border Town Blues was released in 1988 and the album Ride with Me in 1992. These were followed by two more albums for Alligator Records, Border Town Legend (1996) and Swinging from the Rafters (1997). In 1999, Hunter teamed up with Lonnie Brooks and Phillip Walker to release Lone Star Shootout.

Hunter appeared at the Long Beach Blues Festival in 1996 and 2000. His last album was Looking for a Party (2009).

He died on January 4, 2016, at his home in Phoenix, Arizona.

== Discography ==
Year	Title	Record label
1988	Texas Border Town Blues	Double Trouble
1992	Ride with Me	Alligator
1994	Smooth Magic	Double Trouble
1996	Border Town Legend	Alligator
1997	Swinging from the Rafters	Alligator
1999	Ooh Wee Pretty Baby!	Norton
1999	Lone Star Shootout	Alligator
2003	One Foot in Texas	Doc Blues
2009	Looking for a Party	Blues Express

== See also ==
- List of Texas blues musicians
- List of electric blues musicians
