= Border Town Legend =

Studio album by Long John Hunter
- Released: January 30, 1996
- Studio: Gem/Lone Star
- Genre: Blues
- Length: 50:45
- Label: Alligator
- Producers: Tarry Owens; Jon Foose

Long John Hunter chronology
Smooth Magic (1994)	Border Town Legend (1996)	Swinging from the Rafters (1997)

Border Town Legend is an album by the American musician Long John Hunter, released on January 30, 1996, by Alligator Records. The album title refers to the many years Hunter spent playing in El Paso and Ciudad Juárez nightclubs. Border Town Legend was one of the most played albums on blues radio the year of its release and was nominated for a W. C. Handy Award. Hunter supported it with a North American tour.

== Production ==
Produced by Tarry Owens and Jon Foose, Border Town Legend was recorded at Gem/Lone Star Studio, in Austin. Hunter wrote nine of the album's twelve songs. He was most influenced by B. B. King, rather than Texas blues musicians, but tried to find his own sound; he considered himself more an entertainer than an accomplished musician. Hunter used a horn section on many of the tracks. "John's Funk" is an instrumental. "Everybody Knows" is a cover of the O. V. Wright song.

== Critical reception ==
Professional ratings
Review scores
Source	Rating
AllMusic	4.5/5 stars
Chicago Sun-Times	4/4 stars
DownBeat	3/5 stars
MusicHound Blues: The Essential Album Guide	4/5 stars
The Penguin Guide to Blues Recordings	2.5/4 stars
The Virgin Encyclopedia of the Blues	4/5 stars

The Los Angeles Times said that Border Town Legend "reveals Hunter as a raw, feral talent bursting with energy... His vocals are high and joyfully reedy, his guitar playing alternately restrained and flashy." The Chicago Tribune called it "a simmering pot of hot, R&B-grooved Texas-style blues, distinguished by Hunter's smooth crooning and bell-toned, Albert Collins-ish guitar leads." The Michigan Chronicle noted that "Hunter's secret weapon is a funky baritone sax ace by the name of Kevin Brown." The Chicago Sun-Times labeled the album "tough music for grownups."

The Dallas Observer deemed it "a travelogue of Hunter's eccentric life—the barrooms of Beaumont, the sparkling lights of Marfa, and the fields of Arkansas—set to a boogie-blues beat." The Kansas City Star praised "Hunter's spare-but-spunky songwriting, engaging vocals and infectious guitar stylings." The Post-Tribune considered Border Town Legend "a good guitarist's blues album, and Hunter writes nine fast-paced songs that loosely mirror his influences, T-Bone Walker and B. B. King."

== Track listing ==
No.	Title	Length
1.	"T-Bone Intentions"	3:08
2.	"Ice Cold"	4:21
3.	"Ole Red"	5:24
4.	"Marfa Lights"	4:52
5.	"Nasty Ways"	3:30
6.	"Grits Ain't Groceries"	2:53
7.	"Arkansas"	5:19
8.	"Rooster and the Hen"	5:42
9.	"Lone Star Shootout"	4:07
10.	"Everybody Knows"	3:22
11.	"Road Hog"	3:59
12.	"John's Funk"	4:08
Total length:		50:45
