= Serious Intentions =

Studio album by William Clarke
- Released: 1992
- Genre: Blues
- Label: Alligator
- Producer: William Clarke

William Clarke chronology
Blowin' Like Hell (1990)	Serious Intentions (1992)	Groove Time (1994)

Serious Intentions is an album by the American musician William Clarke, released in 1992. He supported it with North American and United Kingdom tours.

== Production ==
Clarke used primarily a chromatic harmonica on Serious Intentions. He had been playing some of the album's songs for years. He wanted more horns than on his Alligator Records debut, and tried to play his harmonica solos in a similar fashion to those of an alto saxophonist. He also overdubbed many of his vocal and harmonica tracks. "The Work Song" is a version of the Nat Adderley song. "Soon Forgotten" was written by St. Louis Jimmy Oden. "Trying to Stretch My Money" is about the financial hardships of living as a working musician. "Chasin' the Gator" is an instrumental.

== Critical reception ==
Professional ratings
Review scores
Source	Rating
All Music Guide to the Blues	5/5 stars
Houston Chronicle	3/5 stars
Los Angeles Times	3/4 stars
MusicHound Blues: The Essential Album Guide	3/5 stars
The News-Journal	3.5/5 stars
The North County Blade Citizen	4/5 stars
The Penguin Guide to Blues Recordings	3.5/4 stars
The Press of Atlantic City	3/4 stars
The Rolling Stone Jazz & Blues Album Guide	4/5 stars
The Virgin Encyclopedia of the Blues	3/5 stars

The Washington Post noted that "Clarke possesses a big, gruff voice that's every bit as imposing as his harp." The Chicago Sun-Times said that the album "brilliantly frames his gruff vocals and amplified harmonica around sweet jazzy guitars, acoustic bass, drums and a piano." The Los Angeles Times praised "the strong singing and tough playing". The North County Blade Citizen stated, "Clarke is as good a harmonica player as you will find, period."

The News-Journal admired his "smooth melodic style". The Associated Press concluded that Clarke "successfully melds the urban drive of Chicago blues with the mellowness of California swing." The Houston Chronicle said that "his move are obvious and often too stylized."

Writing for AllMusic, Cub Koda and Michael Erlewine stated that the "follow-up to Blowin' Like Hell burns with a ferocious intensity, particularly for his groundbreaking work on chromatic harp and his ability to cover all styles with remarkable elan."

== Track listing ==
No.	Title	Length
1.	"Pawnshop Bound"
2.	"Trying to Stretch My Money"
3.	"Educated Fool"
4.	"Going Down This Highway"
5.	"I Know You're Fine"
6.	"Driving My Life Away"
7.	"Chasin' the Gator"
8.	"With a Tear in My Eye"
9.	"It's Been a Long Time"
10.	"The Work Song"
11.	"I Feel Like Jumping"
12.	"Soon Forgotten"
