= Maurice Vaughn =

Maurice Vaughn may refer to:

- Maurice Vaughn, alternative name of Sunny Skylar, American composer (1913–2009)
- Mo Vaughn (born 1967), Major League Baseball first baseman
- Maurice John Vaughn (born 1952), American blues musician
