= Selwyn Birchwood =

American blues guitarist, vocalist and songwriter

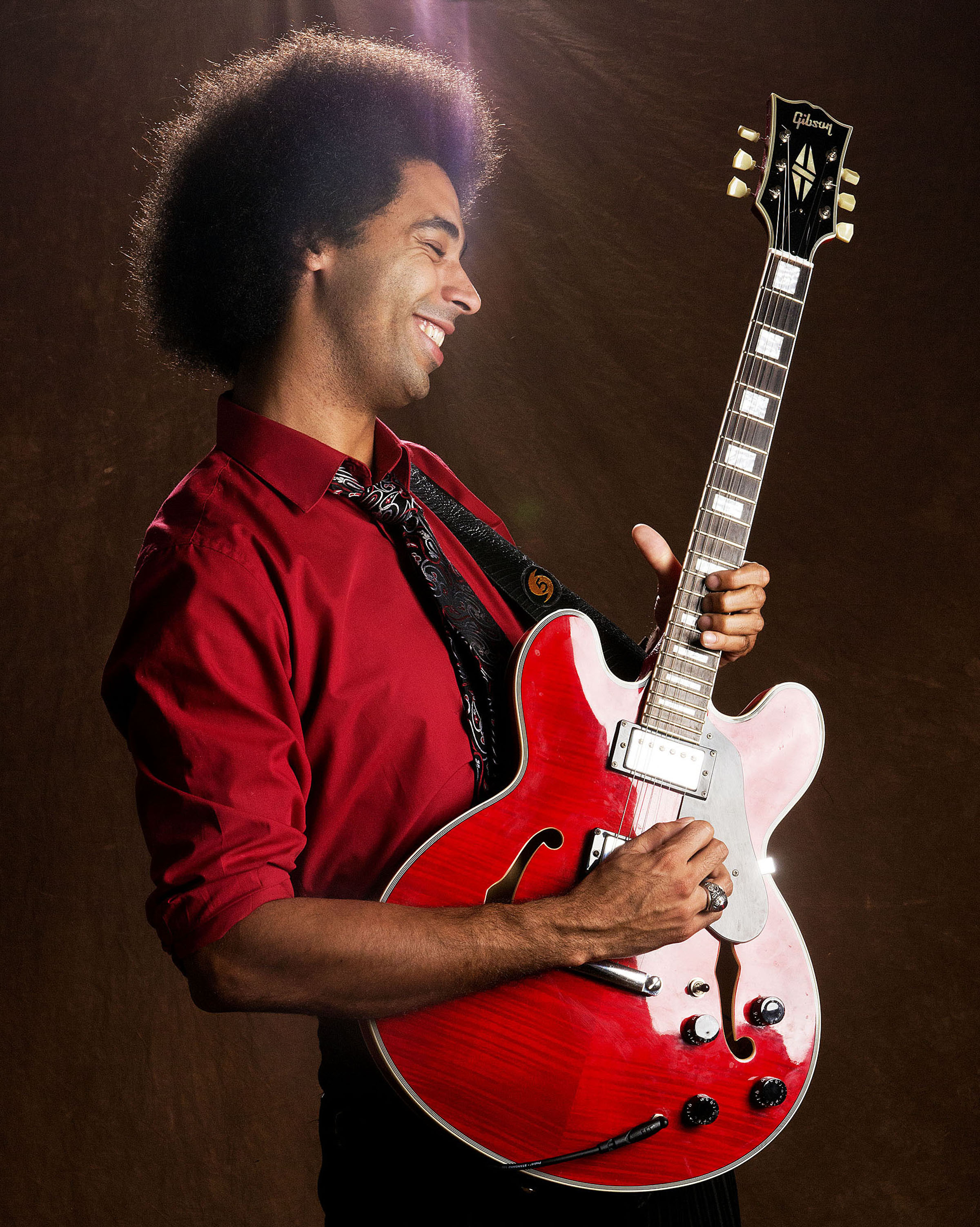
- Selwyn Birchwood; Photo by Paul Natkin

Background information
- Born: Selwyn Birchwood; March 9, 1985 (age 41); Orlando, Florida, United States
- Genres: Blues, R&B, rock
- Occupations: Electric guitar, lap steel guitar, singer
- Instruments: Guitar, vocals
- Years active: 1998–present
- Label: Alligator Records
- Website: www.selwynbirchwood.com

Selwyn Birchwood (born March 9, 1985) is an American blues guitarist, vocalist and songwriter from Tampa, Florida. He was the winner of the Blues Foundation’s 2013 International Blues Challenge (band category), as well the winner of the Albert King Guitarist of the Year award, presented at the same event. To win, he bested 125 other bands from around the world. Birchwood plays electric guitar and electric lap steel guitar. His live performances feature his original songs. Living Blues magazine said, "Selwyn Birchwood is making waves, surprising people and defying expectations. Be on the lookout. He revels in the unexpected." The Tampa Tribune said Birchwood plays with "power and precision reminiscent of blues guitar hero Buddy Guy. He is a gritty vocalist [who is] commanding with his axe." Rolling Stone said "Birchwood is a young, powerhouse guitarist and soulful vocalist. Don't Call No Ambulance is a remarkable debut by a major player." The Washington Post said, "Selwyn Birchwood is an indelibly modern and original next-generation bluesman; his tough vocals, guitar and lap steel touch on classic Chicago blues, Southern soul and boogie."

== Life and career ==
Birchwood was born in Orlando, Florida. His father was born in Tobago and his mother in the United Kingdom. He began playing guitar at age 13, playing primarily popular non-blues music. He soon discovered Jimi Hendrix, who became a major influence. Reading about Hendrix's blues influences led Birchwood to the blues, and he became a dedicated blues fan by the age of 17. He names Buddy Guy, Freddie King, Muddy Waters, Albert King, Lightnin' Hopkins and Albert Collins as among his favorite artists. Birchwood attended a Guy concert in Orlando when he was 18. In an interview in Blues & Rhythm magazine, Birchwood recalled, "It just blew me away. It was like someone getting up and getting me by the shirt and shaking me around. I will never forget it. At that point was when I decided that this is what I want to do."

At the age of 19, Birchwood was introduced to the neighbor of a friend, who told Birchwood that his neighbor was a blues guitarist and band leader. The neighbor was Clarence Smith, who performs and records under the name Sonny Rhodes, a veteran blues musician originally from Texas who spent many years in California. Rhodes played both electric guitar and electric lap steel guitar. Rhodes had recorded multiple singles, the first released in the early 1960s, and a number of albums, his first released in 1977. Birchwood's playing impressed Rhodes and soon Rhodes invited Birchwood to join his touring band. According to Living Blues magazine, Birchwood was just out of high school when Rhodes took him out on tour. He toured with Rhodes off and on for four years while attending college. In the same article, Birchwood stated, "I learned a lot from him (Rhodes). He took me all over the United States, all over Canada…and he showed me what the lifestyle was like. He always kept me second in command, by his side, and tried to show me how to be a bandleader. He showed me the business side of it." It was also Rhodes who inspired Birchwood to take up lap steel guitar. "Sonny always said, 'Play what's in your heart.' I've never lost sight of that," said Birchwood.

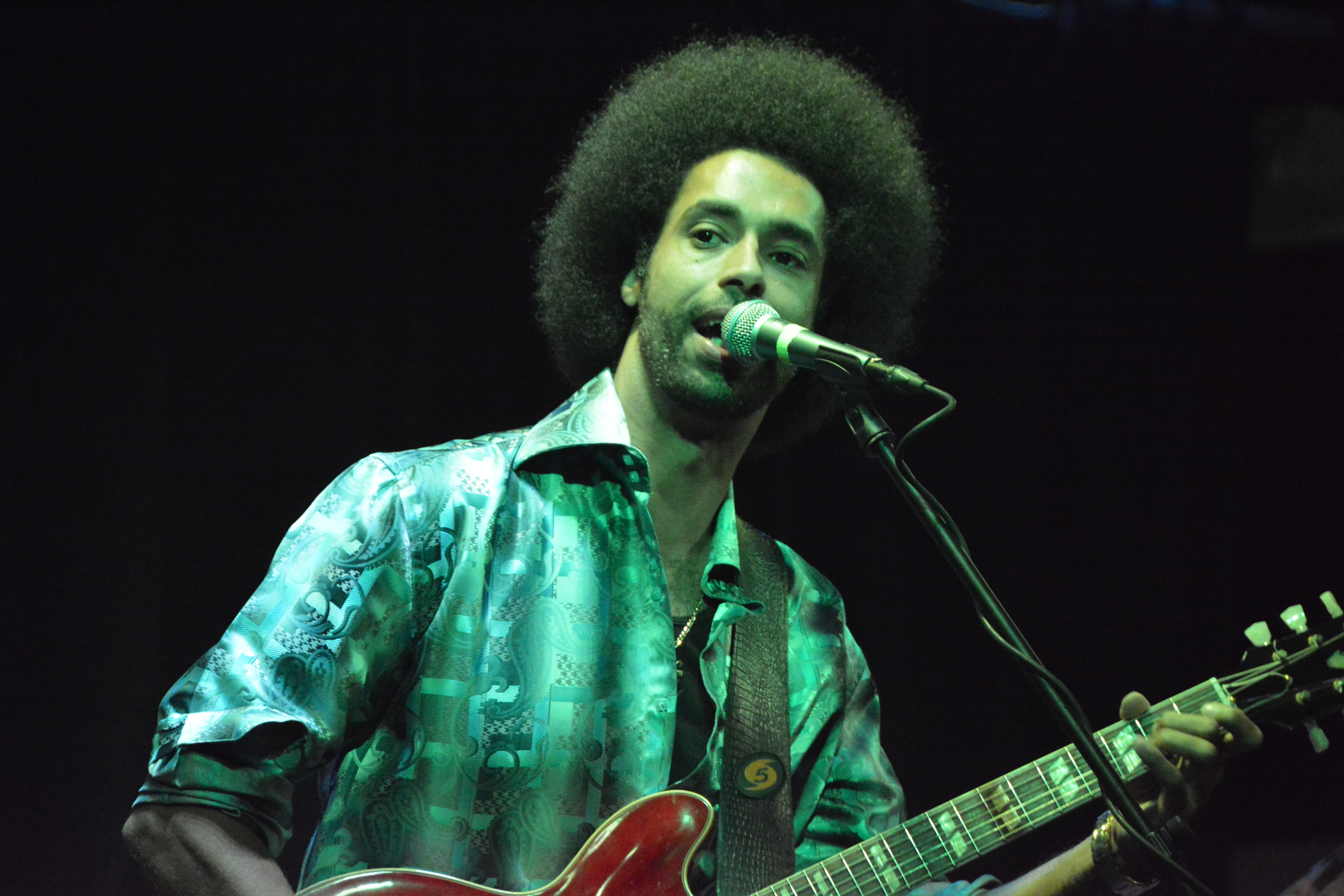
Birchwood singing in 2018.

Birchwood continued his education and received his MBA from the University of Tampa. "I challenged myself to get that degree," Birchwood said. "These days, it's not good enough to just be a good player." In 2010, Birchwood moved to Tampa and formed the current version of The Selwyn Birchwood Band, with Donald Wright on bass, Curtis Nutall on drums and baritone sax player Regi Oliver. The band competed in the 2012 International Blues Challenge before winning in 2013. Alligator Records president Bruce Iglauer was a judge for the finals of the Blues Challenge in 2013. He stated, "I saw Selwyn's potential in 2012. He absolutely deserved to win in 2013." The band began touring outside of Florida and, in early 2014, signed with the Intrepid Artists booking agency of Charlotte, North Carolina.

Since winning the International Blues Challenge, the Selwyn Birchwood Band has performed at many festivals including The Springing the Blues Festival, The Mississippi Valley Blues Festival, The Tampa Bay Blues Festival, The King Biscuit Blues Festival, The North Atlantic Blues Festival and also on The Legendary Rhythm & Blues Cruise. Birchwood has opened for Robert Cray and Buddy Guy, and has shared the stage with veteran bluesman and fellow Alligator Records artist Joe Louis Walker (who made a guest appearance on Don't Call No Ambulance).

On June 10, 2014, Chicago-based Alligator Records released his debut album for the label, Don't Call No Ambulance. The album was produced by Birchwood, recorded in Florida and mixed in Chicago under the supervision of Birchwood and Alligator Records president Bruce Iglauer. Previous to the Alligator release, Birchwood had self-released two CDs, FL Boy (2011) and Road Worn (2013).

In 2015, Birchwood won a Blues Music Award in the 'Best New Artist Album' category for Don't Call No Ambulance.

== Discography ==
- 2011: FL Boy
- 2013: Road Worn
- 2014: Don't Call No Ambulance (Alligator)
- 2017: Pick Your Poison
- 2021: Living in a Burning House
- 2023: Exorcist
- 2024: Old School
- 2026: Electric Swamp Funkin' Blues

== Current band members ==
- Selwyn Birchwood – Guitar, Lap Steel, Vocals
- Regi Oliver – Baritone Saxophone, Tenor Saxophone, Alto Saxophone, Bass Clarinet, Flute
- Donald "Huff" Wright – Bass
