= Michael Burks =

American singer

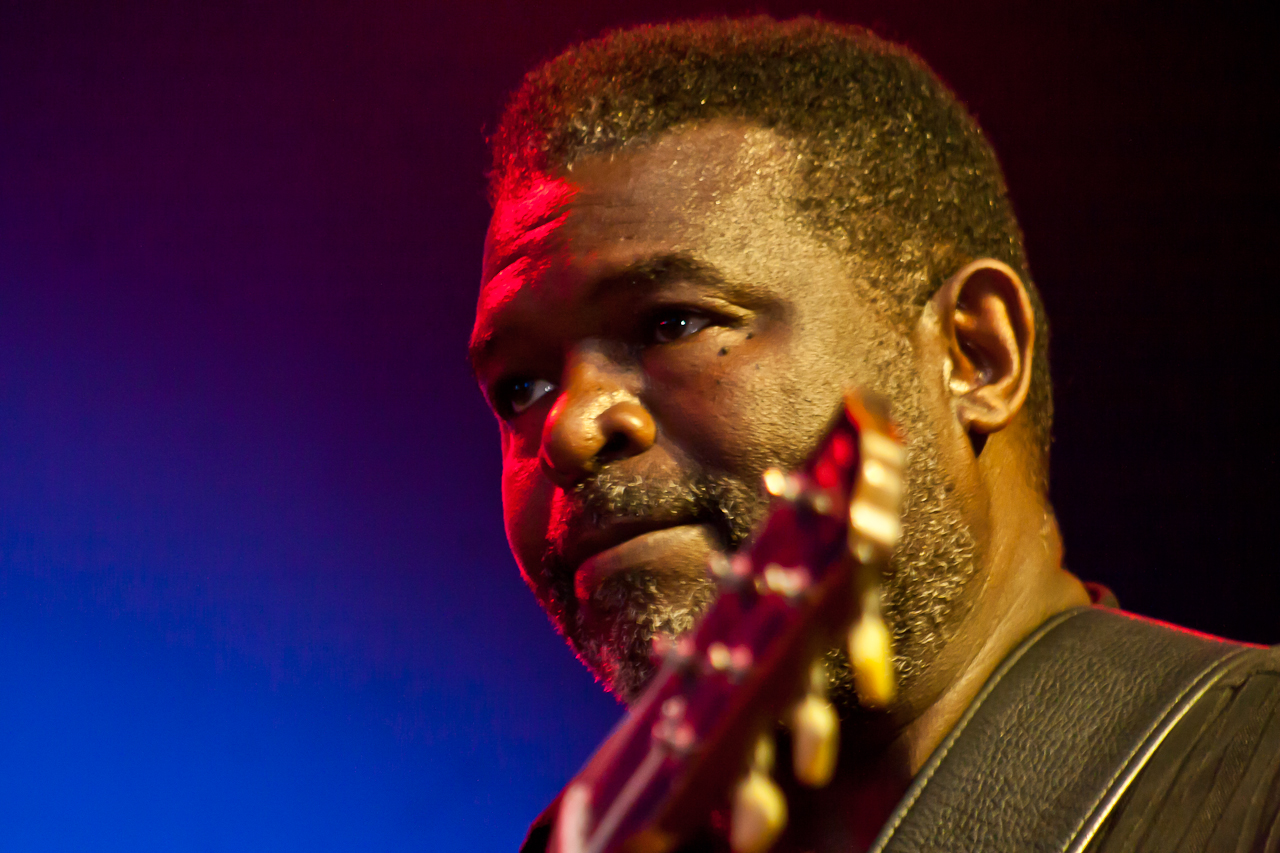
- Michael Burks (2012)

Background information
- Also known as: Iron Man
- Born: July 30, 1957; Milwaukee, Wisconsin, United States
- Died: May 6, 2012 (aged 54) Atlanta, Georgia, United States
- Genres: Electric blues, soul blues, blues rock
- Occupations: Guitarist, singer, songwriter
- Instruments: Guitar, vocals
- Years active: 1970s–2012
- Labels: Vent, Alligator
- Website: Official website

Michael Burks (July 30, 1957 – May 6, 2012) was an American electric blues and soul blues guitarist, singer and songwriter. He is best known for his tracks, "Everybody's Got Their Hand Out", "I Smell Smoke" and "Hard Come, Easy Go", and variously worked with Johnnie Taylor, O. V. Wright, and Marquise Knox. He was the son of the bassist, Frederick Burks.

The AllMusic journalist, Tim Sheridan once noted "... while his vocals are not stellar, he has a rich, gritty quality to his singing that is nicely matched to his guitar playing." Burks was known as 'Iron Man' for his energetic and passion filled performances on stage. He was nominated five times for a Blues Music Award and, in 2004, Living Blues presented him with the Critics' Award for Best Guitarist.

== Life and career ==
Burks was born in Milwaukee, Wisconsin, United States, and had a musical heritage. His father played the bass guitar, and performed with Sonny Boy Williamson II, while his grandfather had played in a delta blues style. Burks junior had learned to play the guitar by the age of five, and first played on stage in his cousin's band. In the early 1970s, Burks moved with his family to Camden, Arkansas. It was there that Burks and his father built a 300-seater juke joint named the Bradley Ferry Country Club, where Burks duly led the house band.

After the club closed in the mid 1980s, Burks was employed as a mechanic at Lockheed Martin. He continued to play at local clubs and music festivals, until 1997, when he recorded and produced his debut album, From the Inside Out. The magazine, Blues Access, stated it was "the most impressive indie in recent memory", and Living Blues described it as one of "the best debut discs of the year." In 2001, Alligator Records signed Burks to a recording contract, and he released Make It Rain with them the same year. Make It Rain was produced by Jim Gaines and Bruce Iglauer. I Smell Smoke followed in 2003, and five years later Burks issued what turned out to be the final album in his lifetime, Iron Man, named for his long held nickname.

Burks was a regular performer at the King Biscuit Blues Festival. He also appeared at Memphis in May in 2004 and 2009. Burks had completed recording his fifth album, which was due to be released in July 2012.

On May 6, 2012, upon returning from a tour of Europe, Burks collapsed at Hartsfield–Jackson Atlanta International Airport. He was shortly after pronounced dead from a heart attack, at a hospital in Atlanta, Georgia, aged 54.

In 2013, Burks took the Blues Music Award "Contemporary Blues Album of the Year" and "Album of the Year" categories with his posthumous release, Show Of Strength. Another posthumous CD was released in 2016, I'm A Bluesman.

== Discography ==
Year	Title	Record label	US Top Blues Albums
1999	From the Inside Out	Vent Records	
2001	Make It Rain	Alligator Records	
2003	I Smell Smoke	Alligator Records	No. 12
2008	Iron Man	Alligator Records	No. 4
2012	Show of Strength	Alligator Records	No. 4
2016	I'm a Bluesman	Iron Man Records	

== See also ==
- List of electric blues musicians
- List of soul-blues musicians
