= Bad Axe =

Bad Axe may refer to:

- Bad Axe, Michigan
  - Bad Axe High School
- Bad Axe, Wisconsin, the name of Genoa, Wisconsin until 1868
- Bad Axe River, river in Wisconsin
- Bad Axe Massacre in Wisconsin
- Bad Axe (album), an album by Son Seals
- Bad Axe (film), a 2022 film
