= The Son Seals Blues Band =

Studio album by Son Seals
- Released: 1973
- Studio: Sound Studios, Chicago
- Label: Alligator Records
- Producer: Son Seals, Bruce Iglauer

Son Seals chronology
The Son Seals Blues Band (1973)	Midnight Son (1976)

Professional ratings
Review scores
Source	Rating
AllMusic	4/5 stars
Robert Christgau	B
The Encyclopedia of Popular Music	4/5 stars
The Penguin Guide to Blues Recordings	3/4 stars
The Rolling Stone Album Guide	4/5 stars

The Son Seals Blues Band is the debut album by Son Seals, released by Alligator Records in 1973. It was produced by Son Seals and Bruce Iglauer, and was reissued on CD in 1993.

== Critical reception ==
AllMusic called the album "a rough, gruff, no-nonsense affair typified by the decidedly unsentimental track 'Your Love Is like a Cancer'."

== Track listing ==
1. "Mother-In-Law Blues" – 3:12
2. "Sitting At My Window" – 4:30
3. "Look Now, Baby" – 3:24
4. "Your Love Is Like a Cancer" – 4:30
5. "All Your Love" – 3:34
6. "Cotton Picking Blues" – 4:38
7. "Hot Sauce" – 3:04
8. "How Could She Leave Me" – 3:39
9. "Going Home Tomorrow" – 3:37
10. "Now That I'm Down" – 5:58
