= Bridget Kelly Band =

American band

- Origin: Gainesville, Florida, United States
- Genres: Blues rock, blues
- Years active: 2012–present
- Members: Bridget Kelly; Tim Fik; Greg Mullens; Curtis Lyons Jr.
- Past members: Mark Armbrecht; Alex Klausner; Tim Mulberry
- Website: Official website

Bridget Kelly Band is an American blues rock and blues band. Formed in 2012 in Gainesville, Florida, United States, they have released seven albums with their most recent being 2022's Winter's Coming. They took part in the 2015 and 2016 International Blues Challenge in Memphis, Tennessee, finishing as runners-up on both occasions.

== Career ==
The band was formed in Gainesville, Florida, by Bridget Kelly and Tim Fik in 2012. Their debut album, Back in the Blues, was self-released the following year. By the time of the issue of their second album, Forever in Blues (2014), some tracks from the collection were being played on SiriusXM radio. With this release, which contained 15 original numbers all penned by Kelly and Fik, came favorable reviews from music critics in both the United States and United Kingdom. On September 7, 2014, the Bridget Kelly Band (BKB) won the North Central Florida Blues Society sponsored Blues Challenge. This victory meant that they went on to compete in the International Blues Challenge in Memphis, Tennessee, between January 21–24, 2015. The group got as far as the semi-finals. BKB's third album, Outta the Blues was issued in May 2016. The record displayed a mixture of traditional Beale Street blues with strains of Texas blues and blues rock. The recording also included a new rhythm section for the band with Mark Ambrecht on bass and Alex Klausner playing drums, complimenting Kelly's vocals and Fik's guitar work. The album was recorded at Alpha Sun Studios in Gainesville, Florida. One reviewer noted 'touches of funk' in the tracks "If You See My Baby" and "Hard Time In The City". The BKB returned to Memphis in 2016, and reached the semi-finals of the International Blues Challenge for the second year running.

The BKB continued performances at clubs, concerts, and festivals throughout the United States. They also appeared at the "Women in Blues" showcase in Memphis, which took place during the 2017 International Blues Challenge. Their fourth album, Bone Rattler, was self-released in 2017 with the credits being amended to show the Bridget Kelly Band featuring Tim Fik. A tour was implemented to support the album's release and this included concerts in Florida and Georgia, an album release party held in Atlanta, with further club and festival appearances in the Midwest. BKB's 2018 CD, Blues Warrior, tackled tougher subjects in the song's lyrics. These encompassed homelessness, domestic violence, human trafficking and heroin addiction. The group started to enhance their overall sound at concerts, by incorporating the keyboardist, Chris Alexander, to their live shows. By this point, BKB had shared the stage with a number of fellow blues musicians including Albert Castiglia, Biscuit Miller and the Mix, Selwyn Birchwood, Brandon Santini, and Victor Wainwright. The band's live repertoire expanded their venues by appearing at the Bradenton Blues Festival.

Tim Fik was a 2018 recipient from the Blues Foundation of the "Keeping the Blues Alive" Award. The band's 2020 album, Dark Spaces, had lyrical content that delivered messages for the COVID-19 times with subject matter of isolation, loneliness, hope, and optimism. Once again the 13 original songs were written jointly by Kelly and Fik, with the latter undertaking the dual role of guitarist and record producer. The tracks mixed blues, pop, and Southern rock stylings. BKB's latest album, Winter's Coming, was released in November 2022.

They performed at Springing the Blues in April 2022, and both at Buddy Guy's Legends in Chicago, Illinois, and at the House of Blues, in June 2022. They partook in the International Blues Challenge again in January 2023, and played at the Sarasota Blues Fest in March 2023.

== Band members ==
- Bridget Kelly (vocals)
- Tim Fik {guitar}
- Greg Mullins {bass guitar}
- Curtis Lyons Jr. (drums)

== Discography ==
=== Albums ===
Year	Title	Label	Additional credits
2013	Back in the Blues	Self-released	
2014	Forever in Blues	Self-released	
2016	Outta the Blues	Self-released	
2017	Bone Rattler	Self-released	Bridget Kelly Band featuring Tim Fik
2018	Blues Warrior	Self-released	
2020	Dark Spaces	Self-released	
2022	Winter's Coming	Self-released	
