= Jarekus Singleton =

American singer

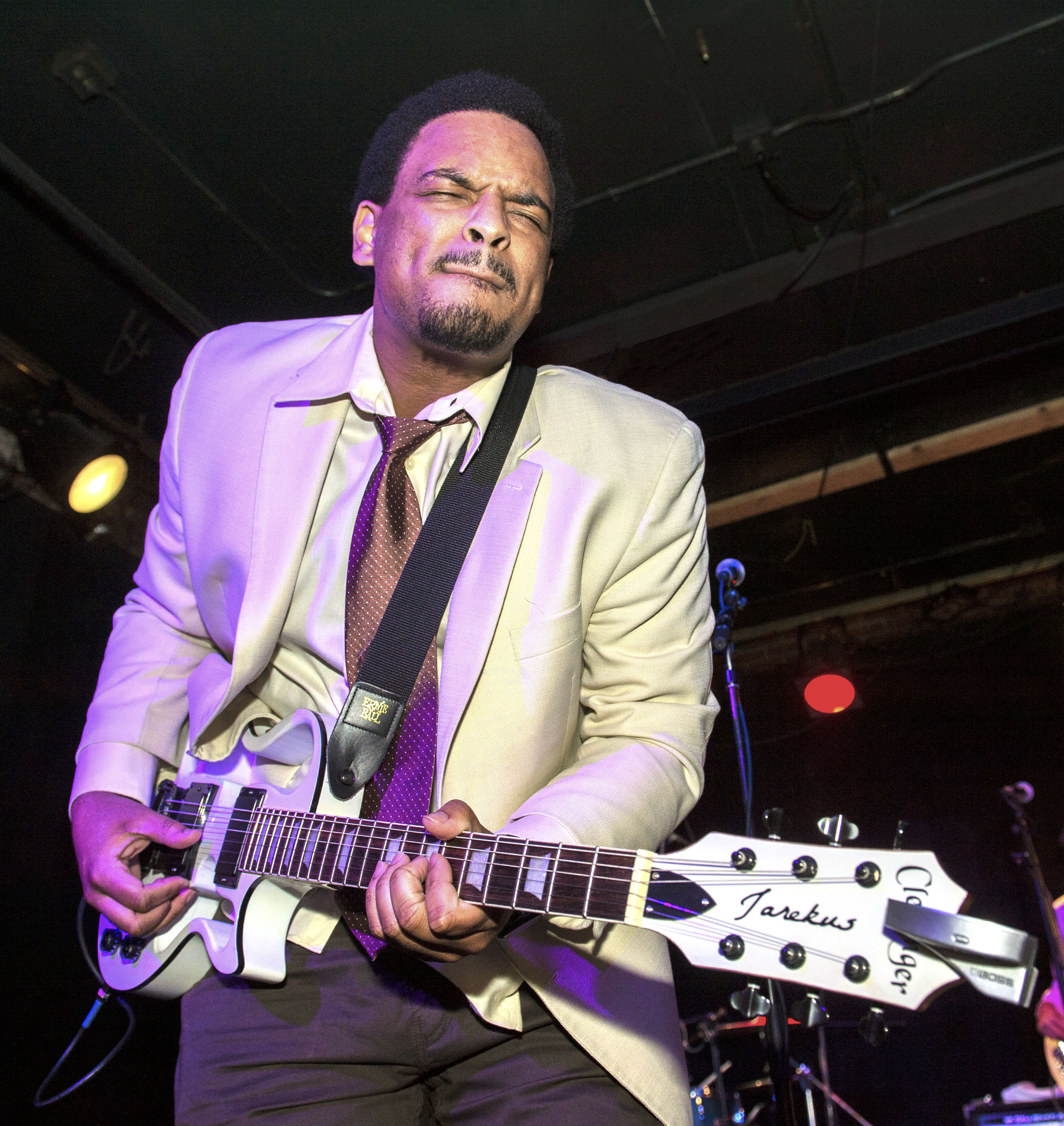
- At the 2014 International Blues Challenge in Memphis, Tennessee

Background information
- Born: Jarekus Singleton; July 11, 1984 (age 42); Clinton, Mississippi, United States
- Genres: Blues, R&B, rock
- Occupations: Guitarist, singer
- Instruments: Guitar, vocals
- Years active: 1993–present
- Label: Alligator Records
- Website: www.jarekus.com

Jarekus Singleton (born July 11, 1984, in Clinton, Mississippi, United States) is an American blues guitarist, singer and songwriter. Refuse To Lose was his first nationally and internationally distributed album. It was released on the Chicago-based independent blues record label Alligator Records on May 6, 2014. England's Blues & Rhythm called Singleton "a great, new blues talent...young, original, soulful and intense...superb, blistering guitar." According to Living Blues magazine, "Jarekus Singleton is making some serious blues noise...blending modern-day blues and emotionally intense soul with melodic, hot-toned lead guitar, funk-seasoned rhythms and hip-hop flavored lyrics." The Washington Post said, "Jarekus Singleton is an exciting new young blues guitarist with melody, hooks, swagger and a strong, original voice. His lyrics are modern, personal, acutely poetic and deeply mature." USA Today said of Singleton, "Stinging blues guitar and potent, original songs herald the emergence of a major new talent."

== Life and career ==
Singleton played bass guitar at age nine at his grandfather's church. He was tutored in music by his uncle. Other family members also played and sang gospel music. Singleton switched to guitar and began to concentrate on his playing and his singing. He first heard blues music at 15, and has named B.B. King, Freddie King, Albert King and Stevie Ray Vaughan among his biggest inspirations. He also listened to rap artists including Jay-Z and Twista and country artists including Brad Paisley. Also during this period, Singleton developed his basketball skills, later becoming a top-seeded college player for University of Southern Mississippi and William Carey University. An ankle injury derailed his basketball career and he began concentrating on music full-time. He performed original lyrics as a rapper, but soon began to combine his blues music with his original lyrics.

The Jarekus Singleton Blues Band formed in 2009, with the band members drawn from the musicians he played with in church. In 2011, Singleton self-released the album Heartfelt, and sold it at live performances and online. B. B. King's Bluesville channel on SiriusXM Radio played three songs from Heartfelt in regular rotation. He won Guitar Center's "King Of The Blues" contest for the state of Mississippi. In 2012, he received the Jackson Music Award for Blues Artist of the Year, as well as the award for 2013 Local Entertainer of the Year. In 2013, The Jackson Free Press named him as Best Local Blues Artist.

He competed in the International Blues Challenge (IBC), an annual contest produced by the Blues Foundation in Memphis, Tennessee, in 2011, 2012, 2013 and 2014. At the 2013 IBC, he was scouted by the president of Alligator Records, Bruce Iglauer. Singleton signed with Alligator in late 2013. In October 2013 and January 2014, Singleton and his band recorded for Alligator at PM Music in Memphis. Iglauer and Singleton co-produced.

Singleton performed at the Mississippi Stage at the Chicago Blues Festival in 2012 and 2013. He appeared at South Carolina's Lowcountry Blues Festival and Festival of Discovery in 2011 as well as many other festivals in the South and clubs throughout Mississippi. In January 2014, Singleton signed with Charlotte, North Carolina's booking agency, Blue Mountain Artists. He played the Springing the Blues Festival in Jacksonville Beach, Florida in April 2014. He is booked to perform at a number of blues festivals in the summer of 2014, including The North Atlantic Blues Festival, Cincinnati Blues Festival, The PA Blues Festival, Flood City Music Festival, The Heritage Blues Festival, The Mississippi Valley Blues Festival, The Blues at the Beach Festival and the Mighty Mississippi Blues Festival.

== Discography ==
- 2011: Heartfelt (Reakdogmusic, LLC)
- 2013: Refuse To Lose (Alligator)
- 2016: Live at Jazzfest 2016 (Munck Music)
- 2018: The Bridge, Part 1 (Reakdogmusic, LLC)

== Honors and awards ==
- Selected as the 2013 Best Local Blues Artist by Jackson Free Press.
- 2013 Jackson Music Award for Local Entertainer of the Year.
- 2012 Jackson Music Award for Blues Artist of the Year.

== Current band members ==
- Jarekus Singleton – Guitar, Vocals
- Sam Brady – Organ, Keyboards
- Ben Sterling – Bass Guitar
- John Blackmon – Drums, Percussion
