= Toronzo Cannon =

American guitarist, vocalist and songwriter

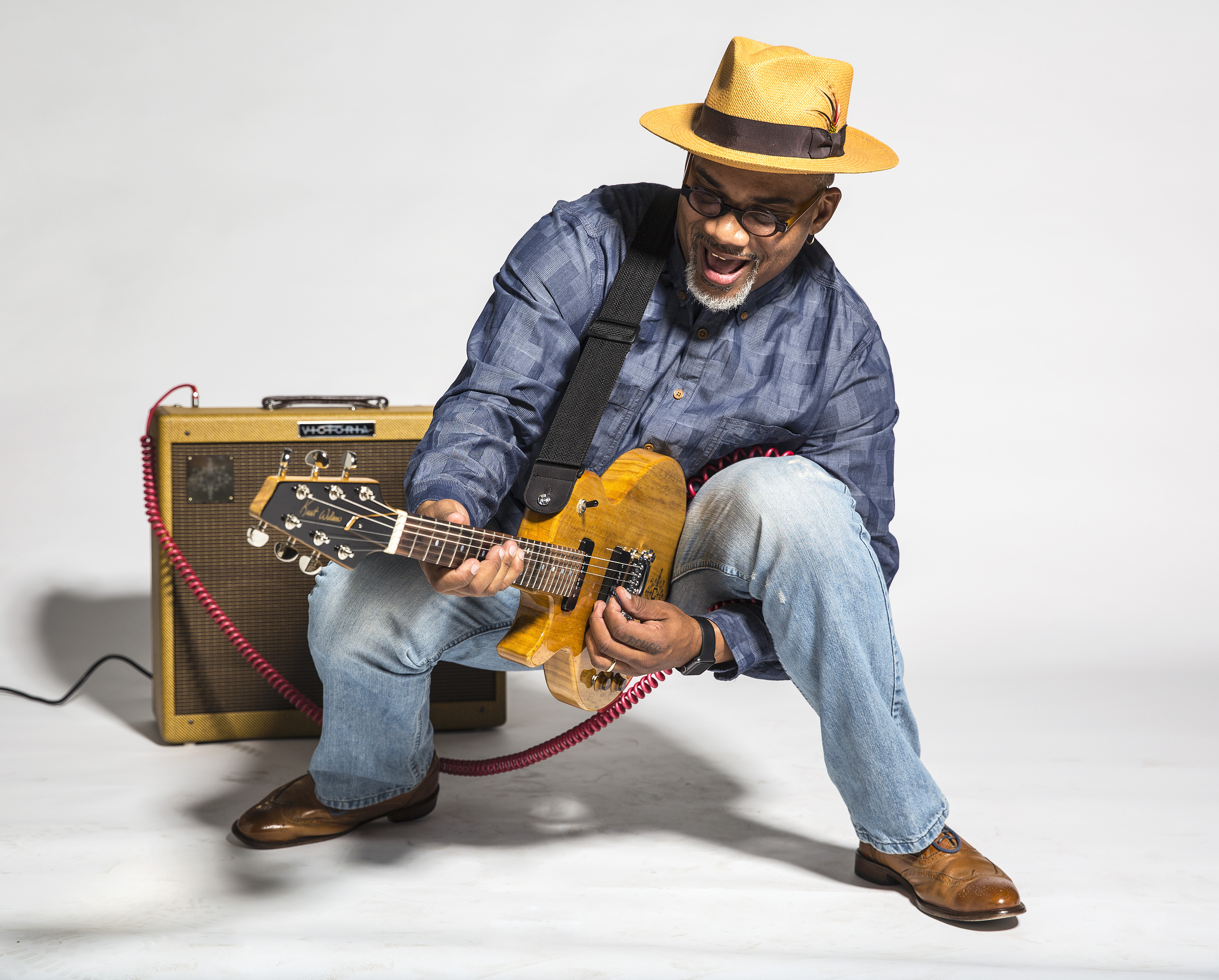
- Photo shoot from The Chicago Way

Background information
- Born: Toronzo Cannon; February 14, 1968 (age 58); Chicago, Illinois, United States
- Genres: Blues, R&B
- Occupations: Guitarist, singer
- Instruments: Guitar, vocals
- Years active: 1996–present
- Labels: Alligator Records, Delmark Records
- Website: www.toronzocannon.com

Toronzo Cannon (born February 14, 1968, in Chicago, Illinois, United States) is an American electric blues guitarist, vocalist and songwriter. He grew up on the South Side of Chicago near the Robert Taylor Homes and Theresa's Lounge where he heard blues artists including Buddy Guy and Junior Wells.

== Biography ==
Cannon first bought a guitar at age 22. He played reggae music before playing blues. Among the influences he has named are Albert Collins, B.B. King, Freddie King, Buddy Guy and Jimi Hendrix.

Cannon played guitar with Tommy McCracken, Wayne Baker Brooks, L.V. Banks and Joanna Connor beginning in 1996. He started his own band, The Cannonball Express in 2001. He recorded My Woman (self-released in 2007), Leaving Mood (Delmark, 2011) and John The Conquer Root (Delmark, 2013). The third album was nominated for a Blues Music Award as Rock Blues Album of the Year in 2013.

He signed with Alligator Records in 2015. His Alligator Records debut, The Chicago Way, co-produced by Cannon and Alligator Records president Bruce Iglauer, was released on February 26, 2016.

Cannon drives a Chicago Transit Authority bus during the day and performs at night, on weekends and during vacation breaks.

Cannon has performed at the Chicago Blues Festival nine times. He headlined in 2015. He has also performed in many United States and European cities. His overseas tours include Mexico (2010), South Africa (2011), Armenia (2013 and 2014), France and Netherlands (2013), France and Spain (2014) and Sweden, France, Spain, Belgium, Netherlands and Luxembourg (2015). His UK debut came at the Edinburgh Blues Club Voodoo Rooms in 2017.

Blues Matters (UK) said, "Toronzo is the real deal. Blistering guitar and inventive songs: jealousy, double-crossing, knives and hand grenades... Chicago style."

The Chicago Tribune said, "Chicago-based Toronzo Cannon, who performed for the first time as a festival headliner, made the most of this opportunity to win over a new audience. His extroverted guitar style sounded especially compelling when he closely engaged with keyboardist Ronnie Hicks' sturdy chord changes. Cannon also has a forceful singing voice, whether narrating an original murder ballad or on his upbeat "Sweet Sweet Sweet."

The Chicago Sun-Times said, "The Bridgeport resident (and CTA bus driver) was immersed in the world of blues by hanging around Theresa’s Lounge. Today he’s one of Chicago’s new greats."

The Chicago Reader said, "Local singer and guitarist Toronzo Cannon shows off his impressive range on 2013's John the Conquer Root (Delmark), tackling full-band soul ("Cold World"), airy acoustic ballads ("Let It Shine Always"), and rough-and-tumble biker-bar rock 'n' roll ("Sweet, Sweet, Sweet"). Cannon excels when he lets his ax take the lead: on the title track, for instance, he doles out slow, shimmying riffs and smoldering licks.

Blues & Rhythm (UK) said, "Without sounding like I'm going over the top with praise, this release is terrific and top heavy with superb musicianship and quality material and is worthy of any blues lover's attention. It also highlights the cream of the next generation of blues musicians starting to make their names on the Chicago blues scene."

His 2016 album, The Chicago Way was nominated for a Blues Music Award in 2017 as Album of the Year.

He released the album “The Preacher, the Politician or The Pimp” in 2019 and “Shut Up & Play” in 2024.

== Discography ==
- 2007: My Woman (Ta Music)
- 2011: Leaving Mood (Delmark)
- 2013: John The Conquer Root (Delmark)
- 2016: The Chicago Way (Alligator)
- 2019: The Preacher, The Politician or the Pimp (Alligator)
- 2024: Shut Up & Play (Alligator)

== Honors and awards ==
- 2013 Blues Music Award nomination for Rock Blues Album of the Year

== Current band members ==
- Toronzo Cannon – vocals, lead guitar, rhythm guitar
- Brian Quinn – bass guitar
- Phillip Burgess – drums
- Adam Pryor - keyboards
