= Lettin' Go (album) =

Studio album by Son Seals
- Released: 2000
- Label: Telarc
- Producers: Son Seals, Jimmy Vivino

Son Seals chronology
Nothing but the Truth (1994)	Lettin' Go (2000)

Professional ratings
Review scores
Source	Rating
AllMusic	4/5 stars
Boston Herald	3.5/4 stars
The Encyclopedia of Popular Music	3/5 stars
The Penguin Guide to Blues Recordings	2.5/4 stars

Lettin' Go is the final studio album by Son Seals, released in 2000. It was his only album for Telarc.

In 2001, at the 22nd W.C. Handy Blues Awards (since 2006 the Blues Music Awards), Lettin' Go was nominated for Blues Album of the Year and Traditional Blues Album of the Year. It won the award in the latter category.

== Production ==
The album was produced by Seals and Jimmy Vivino. Al Kooper contributed Hammond B-3 organ. The album's final track, a remake of Seal's "Funky Bitch", features Phish's Trey Anastasio. Two of the album's songs were cowritten with novelist Andrew Vachss.

== Critical reception ==
AllMusic called the album "a sturdy, hard-hitting, and above all welcome comeback album from one of the acknowledged greats of Chicago blues guitar." The Washington Post wrote that "guitar fans will appreciate the many opportunities that Seals gets to show off his six-string skills, which produce a flurry of stinging high notes and guttural slurs." The Chicago Tribune wrote: "Lettin' Go is most refreshing when the band jumps away from the confining electric-blues formula; 'Osceola Rock' rewrites Elvis Presley's 'Jailhouse Rock' as a rollicking tribute to Seals' Arkansas hometown."

== Track listing ==
1. "Bad Blood" – 4:46
2. "Let It Go" – 4:21
3. "Give the Devil His Due" – 5:24
4. "Doc's Blues" – 3:35
5. "Hair On A Frog" – 4:03
6. "Jelly, Jelly" – 7:07
7. "Osceola Rock" – 4:21
8. "Dear Son" – 6:57
9. "I Got Some Of My Money" – 4:32
10. "Rockin' and Rollin' Tonight" – 3:02
11. "Bad Luck Child" – 5:06
12. "Blues Holy Ghost" – 5:52
13. "Love Had A Breakdown" – 5:22
14. "Funky Bitch" – 5:58
