= Bad Axe (album) =

Studio album by Son Seals
- Released: 1984
- Recorded: 1984
- Genre: Blues
- Label: Alligator Records
- Producer: Son Seals, Bruce Iglauer

Son Seals chronology
Chicago Fire (1980)	Bad Axe (1984)	Living in the Danger Zone (1991)

Professional ratings
Review scores
Source	Rating
AllMusic	4/5 stars
Robert Christgau	B+
The Encyclopedia of Popular Music	4/5 stars
The Penguin Guide to Blues Recordings	2.5/4 stars
The Rolling Stone Album Guide	3.5/5 stars

Bad Axe is a studio album by Son Seals, released through Alligator Records in 1984. It won the 1985 W.C. Handy Award for best contemporary blues album.

== Production ==
The album was produced by Son Seals and Bruce Iglauer. It was recorded at Streeterville Studios, in Chicago, Illinois.

== Critical reception ==
Robert Christgau wrote that Seals "doesn't stand still—this time he's singing tenderly enough to bring off the self-servingly sentimental 'I Can Count on My Blues'." The Globe and Mail thought that "Seals' marvellously sure-fingered lead runs and warm voice are in fine shape."

== Track listing ==
1. "Don't Pick Me For Your Fool" – 3:46
2. "Going Home" – 3:12
3. "Just About To Lose Your Clown" – 3:12
4. "Friday Again" – 3:50
5. "Cold Blood" – 3:10
6. "Out Of My Way" – 3:35
7. "I Think You're Fooling Me" – 3:52
8. "I Can Count On My Blues" – 6:08
9. "Can't Stand To See Her Cry" – 4:03
10. "Person To Person" – 3:12
