= Springing the Blues =

Annual blues festival held in Jacksonville Beach, Florida

Coordinates: 30.2905°N 81.3894°W

Springing the Blues Festival
- Genre: Blues
- Location: Jacksonville Beach, Florida
- Years active: 1990–present
- Website: Springing the Blues

Springing the Blues is an annual blues festival held in Jacksonville Beach, Florida. It is one of the largest and oldest blues festivals on the East Coast of the United States. It was first held in 1990 and has been held yearly on the first weekend of April.

== History ==
The first Springing the Blues festival was held in 1991. The 20th anniversary edition in 2010 featured new features including an exhibit at Beaches Historical Museum and a story contest. The event is free.

== Past festival lineups ==
Past performers have included Joe Bonamassa, Derek Trucks, Sharrie Williams, Larry McCray, Phillip Walker, Tinsley Ellis, Saffire – The Uppity Blues Women, Maurice John Vaughn, Earl King, Mitch Woods And His Rocket 88's, Susan Tedeschi, North Mississippi Allstars, Tab Benoit, Little Jimmy King, Henry Gray and the Cats, Clarence "Gatemouth" Brown, Ruby Wilson, Charlie Musselwhite, Roger "Hurricane" Wilson (2006), Rod Piazza & the Mighty Flyers, Eric Steckel, Robert Jr. Lockwood, Trampled Under Foot, Alexis P. Suter Band, Victor Wainwright and the Wildroots, R. L. Burnside, Otis Taylor, Smokey Wilson, Coco Montoya, Smokin' Joe Kubek, JJ Grey & MOFRO, Bnois King, and in April 2022, the Bridget Kelly Band.

== Accolades ==
- Named by DownBeat magazine as one of the top 50 Music Festivals in the World.
- Named by SouthEast Tourism Society as one of the top 20 destination events in the country.
- Voted in 1997 as "Best Festival in Northeast Florida" by the Folio Weekly magazine annual poll.
- Sam Veal is the festival's founder. Springing the Blues was the first festival he produced.

== See also ==
- List of blues festivals
- List of folk festivals
