= Eric Lindell =

American singer-songwriter (born 1969)

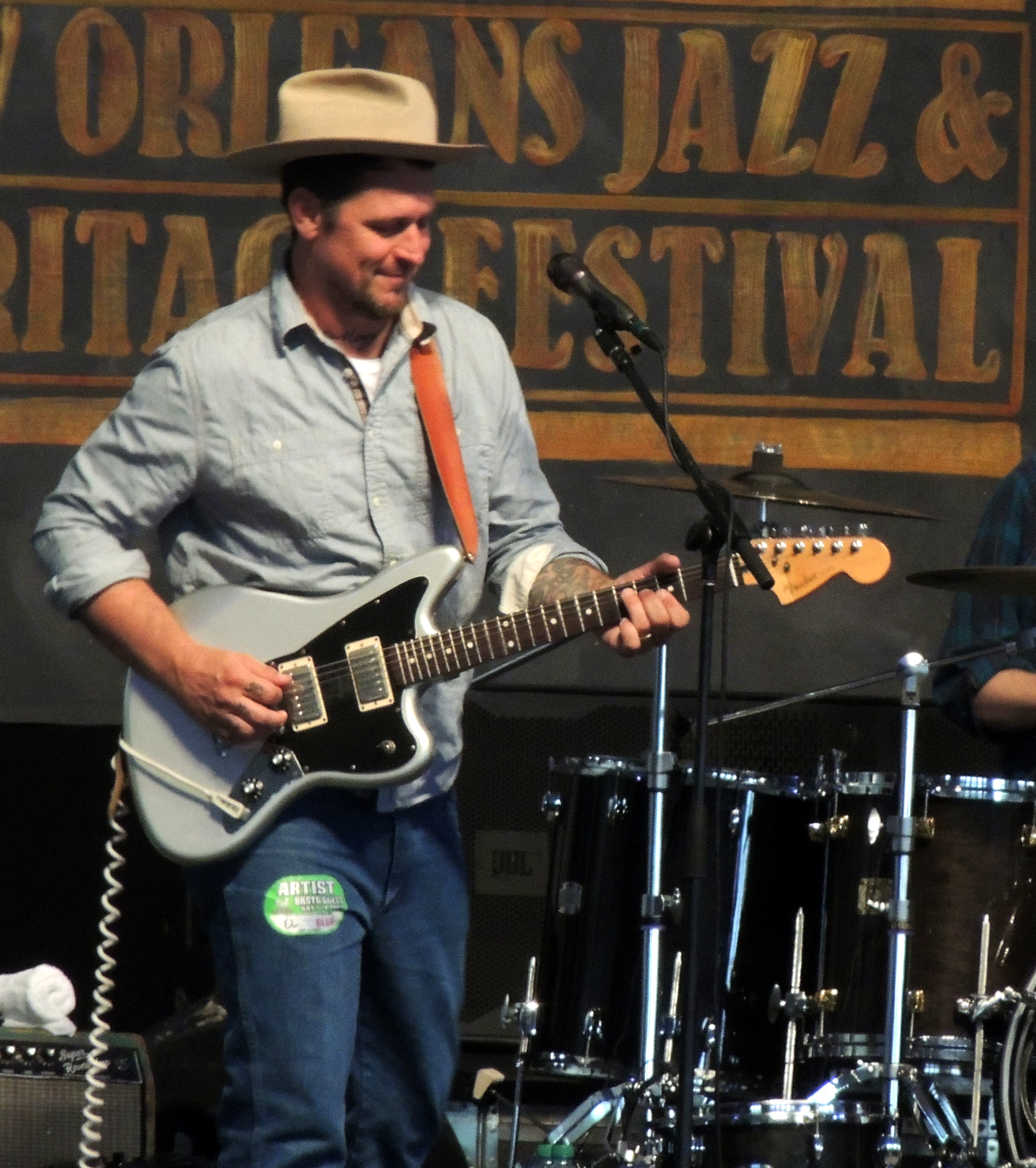
Eric Lindell in 2013

Eric Lindell (born 1969, Northern California, United States) is an American singer-songwriter. His recording career began in 1996 as a regional Sonoma County-based artist. Since 2006, when he was picked up by Alligator Records, he has toured nationally and internationally. He recorded three albums for Alligator and has since issued several CDs on smaller indie labels.

== Background ==
Lindell grew up in the San Francisco Bay Area. He began playing in bands at the age of 15. Among his early musical influences were Fishbone and Black Flag.

Lindell started playing in Northern California bars and clubs, first on guitar, and later moving to bass, while working as a baker during the day to make ends meet. After a few years, he moved to New York City briefly, and then relocated to New Orleans in 1999. In New Orleans, he recorded with Harold Ray Brown (formerly of War) as well as members of Galactic, including Galactic's Stanton Moore and Ivan Neville (with whom he now occasionally plays in a side project called Dragon Smoke.) By 2005, he had become well known on the New Orleans music scene, having appeared in local clubs and at the New Orleans Jazz & Heritage Festival. As a result of the exposure, he was signed by Alligator Records.

Alligator's initial release by Lindell was Change in the Weather, a compilation of tracks from his various self-produced albums and EPs, some released on his own Sparco Records label. Notably, the self-titled album and Piety Street Sessions with Marty Joyce on drums, Cass Faulconer on bass and Marc Adams on B3 as well as others. Change in the Weather yielded the radio single "Give It Time" which received major play on adult album alternative-formatted stations around the country and was featured in an episode of the Boston Legal TV show. His second Alligator release was produced for the label by Lindell. The radio single, "Lay Back Down", was again well received by AAA, and also appeared in the TV shows True Blood and Friday Night Lights. Gulf Coast Highway, his third Alligator release (also self produced), found him accompanied by members of Galactic as well as members of Lindell's touring band. "If Love Can't Find A Way" was the featured radio track.

He typically performs about 100 live appearances a year. He has made recent trips to perform in Europe and made his first Australian appearance in 2007. He made his network television debut on Late Night with Conan O'Brien in February 2008.

Lindell's Change in the Weather was nominated for the 7th annual Independent Music Awards for Jam Album of the year.

== Critical reviews ==
Lindell's music has been described by USA Today as "pumping soul into funk, blue and roots-rock." (April 23, 2009). The Chicago Sun-Times called Lindell "a tremendous raw talent…with a fully realized musical vision." (January 20, 2008). The Los Angeles Daily News stated, "Lindell serves up bluesy blue-eyed soul. The shuffling interplay of electric guitars, percolating organ and Creole horns never fails to make you feel like dancing." (January 27, 2008).

Lindell's musical style borrows from 1970s blues-rock, soul, and R&B. His style has also been called "blue-eyed soul", a common shorthand used for Anglo blues singers that has been applied to artists like Van Morrison, among others.

== Discography ==
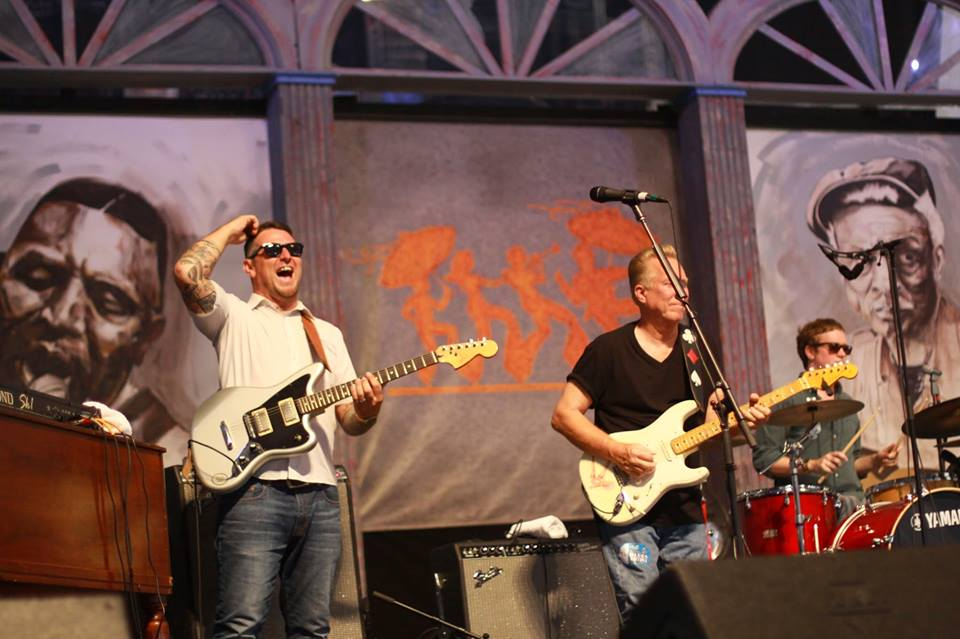
Eric Lindell and Anson Funderburgh perform in the Blues Tent at the 2014 New Orleans Jazz Fest

- 2023 Oakland (Sparco Records)
- 2021 Weed and Gasoline (single; Sparco Records)
- 2018 Revolution in Your Heart (Alligator Records)
- 2016 Matters of the Heart (2016 Red Parlor Records)
- 2012 I Still Love You (Sparco Records)
- 2011 West County Drifter (M.C. Records)
- 2011 Cazadero (Sparco Records)
- 2010 Between Motion and Rest (Sparco Records)
- 2009 Gulf Coast Highway (Alligator Records)
- 2008 Low on Cash, Rich in Love (Alligator Records)
- 2006 Change in the Weather (Alligator Records)
- 2005 Tragic Magic (Sparco Records)
- 2003 EP Volume 1 (Sparco Records)
- 2003 Piety Street Session (Sparco Records)
- 2002 Eric Lindell (album) (self-released)
- 1996 Bring it Back (Grizzly Records)
