= William Clarke (musician) =

American blues harmonica player and singer (1951–1996)

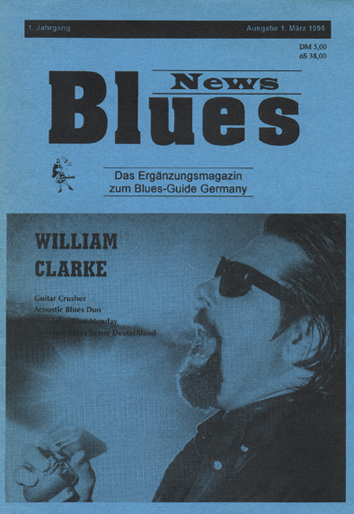
- Clarke on Bluesnews cover

Background information
- Born: March 29, 1951; Inglewood, California, U.S.
- Died: November 2, 1996 (aged 45) Fresno, California
- Genres: Blues
- Occupation: Musician
- Instruments: Harmonica; Vocals
- Years active: 1969–1996
- Label: Alligator

William Clarke (March 29, 1951 – November 2, 1996) was an American blues harmonica player and singer. He was chiefly associated with the Chicago blues style of amplified harmonica, but also incorporated elements of jump blues, swing, and soul jazz into his playing. Clarke was a master of both cross and chromatic harmonica styles and many consider him among the blues harmonica greats.

== Biography ==
Clarke was born in Inglewood, California, on March 29, 1951. In 1967, he began playing harmonica and was soon performing in Los Angeles-area clubs. He struck up an association with blues harmonica virtuoso George "Harmonica" Smith and the two began playing regularly together in 1977; their partnership lasted until Smith died in 1983.

In 1978, Clarke recorded his first album, Hittin' Heavy. Other albums on small labels followed, including Blues from Los Angeles (1980) and Can't You Hear Me Calling (1983). Los Angeles blues musicians Hollywood Fats, Junior Watson, and others backed Clarke for two of his 1980s albums on Satch and Rivera Records, which are now considered classics. From 1985 to 1988, he toured with Rick Holmstrom. His 1987 album Tip of the Top was nominated for a W.C. Handy Award. Clarke sent a demo tape to Alligator Records, who subsequently offered him a recording contract. Blowin' Like Hell, his debut for Alligator, was released in 1990, and he followed the release with international touring. "Must Be Jelly", a song from the album, won a Handy award for "Blues Song of the Year". Several well-received albums for Alligator followed; 1996's The Hard Way received a Handy award for "Best Contemporary Blues album".

Clarke's lifestyle and constant touring led to health problems. After collapsing onstage in Indianapolis, Indiana, he took steps to improve his health. However, he died after a performance in Fresno, California, on November 2, 1996. (Note: Ellis (Blues Access) gives November 3, 1996, as the date of Clarke's death) Dick Shurman, a blues writer and producer, commented:

It's always especially sad when someone makes great steps to get their act/health together, then doesn't get enough time to show the world what they can do with the situation. He was one of the best harp players out there, with maybe the biggest tone, a bluesman with as much soul and swing in his music as anyone could ever ask and a real friend and family man.

== Discography ==
- Hittin' Heavy (Good Time, 1978) – with Hollywood Fats
- Blues from Los Angeles (The 1980s) (Hittin' Heavy, 1980)
- Can't You Hear Me Calling (Watch Dog, 1983; re-released on Rivera; CD reissue: Watch Dog, 2011) – with Junior Watson
- Smokey Wilson & the William Clarke Band (Black Magic (Netherlands), 1986; re-released 1990; CD reissue: Black Magic, 1997)
- Tip of the Top (Satch, 1987; re-released on Double Trouble (Netherlands); CD reissues: King Ace, 2000; Watch Dog, 2010)
- Rockin' the Boat (Rivera, 1988; CD reissue: Watch Dog, 2011) – live recording
- Blowin' Like Hell (Alligator, 1990)
- Serious Intentions (Alligator, 1992)
- Groove Time (Alligator, 1994)
- The Hard Way' (Alligator, 1996)
- Deluxe Edition (Alligator, 1999) – compilation
- Now That You're Gone (William Clarke 1951–1996) (Watch Dog, 2002)
- Live in Germany (Watch Dog, 2005) – with John Marx
- The Early Years, Volume 1: 1978–1985 (Watch Dog, 2006)
- The Early Years, Volume 2: 1985–1991 (Watch Dog, 2006)
- One More Again! (Watch Dog, 2008)
- Double Dealin' (Bluebeat, 2010) – recorded 1983 with Junior Watson
- Live Bootleg Cassette Anthology (Watch Dog, 2010)
- Blues From Los Angeles (1980–1991, Volume 1) (Watch Dog, 2012)
- Blues From Los Angeles (1980–1991, Volume 2) (Watch Dog, 2012)
- Heavy Hittin' West Coast Harp (Bear Family, 2019; limited edition of 1,000 180-gram vinyl LPs) – compilation
- L.A. Blues Party (Watch Dog, 202?)
