= Jesse Dee =

American singer-songwriter

- Born: March 10, 1980 (age 45); Boston, Massachusetts, United States
- Genres: R&B, soul
- Occupations: singer, songwriter, guitarist
- Instruments: Guitar, vocals
- Years active: Late 1990s – present
- Labels: 7not, Alligator
- Website: jessedee.com

Jesse Dee (born March 10, 1980) is an American R&B and soul singer-songwriter from Boston, Massachusetts, United States. He has played as the opening act for Gospel/R&B/Soul legends Al Green and Etta James, and maintains a steady U.S. and international touring schedule. Jesse Dee's current album entitled On My Mind / In My Heart is available online and at various retail outlets. The Boston Globe described his music as "Tough-but-tender soul and rollicking, rootsy R&B...infectious, revival-meeting furor."

== Biography ==
Born in 1980 in Boston, Massachusetts, Dee grew up in nearby Arlington. He got his first taste of soul music from local oldies radio station WODS when he was eight years old. As a child, he was drawn to the sounds of The Drifters, The Shirelles, Smokey Robinson, Sam Cooke and other doo wop, Motown and R&B greats. He always loved singing, and would often record made-up tunes into his tape recorder. He sang in school theatre productions and church choir, and was writing songs by his mid-teens. Dee began fronting a band soon after, but did not pick up his first guitar until he was 18. With help from his musically inclined father and The Bob Dylan Six-Chord Songbook, he taught himself the instrument well enough to start performing as a solo artist a year later. During this period, Jesse immersed himself in the music of Otis Redding, Jackie Wilson, Solomon Burke, Etta James, James Brown and all the deep soul masters, listening, learning, writing and continuing to hone his craft by playing live every chance he could get.

Dee attended Massachusetts College of Art and Design, studying illustration, performance, production, mixed-media and composition. He sang with the ten-piece soul ensemble "Decifunk" (pronounce: Dessifunk), and toured up and down the East Coast. In the early 2000s he even lent his voice to rock 'n' roll band The Dirty Whites before starting his own group. He released his first album, Bittersweet Batch, in 2008.

The success of the CD allowed Dee and his band to travel beyond Boston, making new converts in Washington, DC, New York, Philadelphia, Nashville, and Chicago. He first toured the Netherlands, the UK and Italy in 2009 before heading back again the following two years, this time adding Ireland, Belgium, Germany, France and Spain to his itinerary. Dee has opened for soul greats Al Green, Solomon Burke, Etta James, Bettye LaVette, and blues rockers Los Lobos and the J. Geils Band, and has shared stages many times with fellow soul singer James Hunter.

With his new relationship with Alligator Records, he will tour widely, bringing his modern, fun and timeless soul music to clubs, concert halls and festivals all over the world. Dee is proud of the songs on On My Mind / In My Heart, saying the music is a perfect representation of where he is as an artist. "Soul music is capable of touching the greatest and most diverse group of people," Dee says. "All the best soul music is based on shared experience. Songs have the ability to affect people, shine a light, lift them up, and push them forward. There's hope in these songs," he continues, "and people need that now more than ever."

Of On My Mind / In My Heart, The San Francisco Chronicle said: "The young neo-soul and R&B singer from Boston has put out an album of self-penned songs that are so well-written, so amazingly arranged and performed, you'll wonder why this guy doesn't just own the music business. At the very least, prepare to say "Bruno who?" after hearing these 11 cuts, which find their artistic roots in classic R&B of the '60s and '70s with the kind of thoroughly contemporary vision that made Amy Winehouse great. With a compellingly rough-edged tenor, Dee delivers authenticity with every note. The guitar work is crazy-great. The new CD is such a masterpiece, I'd even move back to Boston just to hear him live."

== Discography ==
Year	Title	Record label
2008	Bittersweet Batch	7not
2013	On My Mind / In My Heart	Alligator
