= The Earthshaker =

Studio album by Koko Taylor
- Released: March 1, 1978
- Genre: Chicago blues; blues; electric blues
- Length: 36:47
- Label: Alligator
- Producer: Koko Taylor, Bruce Iglauer, Richard McLeese

Koko Taylor chronology
Southside Baby (1975)	The Earthshaker (1978)	From the Heart of a Woman (1981)

The Earthshaker is a blues album by Koko Taylor, released in 1978 by Alligator Records. The album has since been released on CD by Alligator.

== Critical reception ==
Professional ratings
Review scores
Source	Rating
Chicago Tribune	3/4 stars
Christgau's Record Guide	B+
The Penguin Guide to Blues Recordings	3/4 stars

Reviewing in Christgau's Record Guide: Rock Albums of the Seventies (1981), Robert Christgau wrote: "Considering its size, Taylor's voice has never been what you'd call rich—she flubs the pitch quite a bit, and on the slow ones she's often sounded flat emotionally as well. But it retains amazing presence—by now it's deepened and roughened so much that her late work for Chess sounds girlish by comparison. Two or three of the slow ones here really drag, always a crippling flaw in Chicago blues, but the uptempo stuff is exemplary—the songs are fun as songs, and the guitar on her latest remake of 'Wang Dang Doodle' is ace."

== Track listing ==
Side one
No.	Title	Writer(s)	Length
1.	"Let the Good Times Roll"	Moore, (Note: Fleecie Moore) Theard	3:00
2.	"Spoonful"	Dixon	3:00
3.	"Walking the Back Streets (Note: Walking the Back Streets and Crying)"	Jones (Note: Sandy Jones, Jr.)	6:45
4.	"Cut You Loose"	London	3:24
5.	"Hey Bartender"	Terry (Note: Dossie Terry)	2:51

Side two
No.	Title	Writer(s)	Length
1.	"I'm a Woman"	McDaniel, Taylor	4:36
2.	"You Can Have My Husband (But Please Don't Mess with My Man)"	La Bostrie	2:45
3.	"Please Don't Dog Me"	Taylor	5:16
4.	"Wang Dang Doodle"	Dixon	4:51
Total length:			36:28

== Personnel ==
- Koko Taylor – vocals
- Johnny B. Moore – guitar
- Sammy Lawhorn – guitar
- Pinetop Perkins – keyboards
- Mervyn "Harmonica" Hinds – harmonica
- Abb Locke – saxophone
- Cornelius "Mule" Boyson – bass
- Vince Chappelle – drums
