= Live and Burning =

Live album by Son Seals
- Released: 1978
- Venue: Wise Fools Pub, Chicago, Illinois
- Genre: Blues
- Label: Alligator Records; 4712
- Producer: Bruce Iglauer

Son Seals chronology
Midnight Son (1976)	Live and Burning (1978)	Chicago Fire (1980)

Professional ratings
Review scores
Source	Rating
AllMusic	4/5 stars
Christgau's Record Guide	A−
The Encyclopedia of Popular Music	4/5 stars
The Penguin Guide to Blues Recordings	2.5/4 stars
The Rolling Stone Album Guide	4/5 stars

Live and Burning is a live album by the blues musician Son Seals, released through Alligator Records in 1978.

== Production ==
The album was recorded at Wise Fools Pub, in Chicago, Illinois. It was produced by Bruce Iglauer.

== Critical reception ==
The Bay State Banner wrote that "the small band clicks well behind Son ... The minimal production and somewhat weak mix don't affect the music's quality greatly."

== Track listing ==
1. "I Can't Hold Out" – 4:14
2. "Blue Shadows Falling" – 6:07
3. "Funky Bitch" – 3:46
4. "The Woman I Love" – 7:18
5. "Help Me, Somebody" – 5:20
6. "She's Fine" – 3:44
7. "Call My Job" – 4:42
8. "Last Night" – 6:46
9. "Hot Sauce" – 2:50
