= Chicago Fire (Son Seals album) =

Studio album by Son Seals
- Released: 1980
- Label: Alligator
- Producer: Son Seals, Bruce Iglauer

Son Seals chronology
Live and Burning (1978)	Chicago Fire (1980)	Bad Axe (1984)

Chicago Fire is a studio album by the blues musician Son Seals, released by Alligator Records in 1980.

== Critical reception ==
Professional ratings
Review scores
Source	Rating
AllMusic	3/5 stars
The Encyclopedia of Popular Music	3/5 stars
MusicHound Blues: The Essential Album Guide	4/5 stars
The Penguin Guide to Blues Recordings	3/4 stars

AllMusic wrote that Seals is "in an experimental mood, utilizing chord progressions that occasionally don't quite fit together seamlessly (but give him an A for trying to expand the idiom's boundaries)."

== Track listing ==
1. "Buzzard Luck" – 5:08
2. "I'm Not Tired" – 3:39
3. "Leaving Home" – 6:42
4. "Landlord at My Door" – 4:25
5. "Gentleman from the Windy City" – 4:08
6. "Goodbye Little Girl" – 3:53
7. "Watching Every Move You Make" – 3:42
8. "Crying Time Again" – 4:37
9. "Nobody Wants a Loser" – 4:22
