= Maurice John Vaughn =

- Born: May 10, 1952 (age 72); Chicago, Illinois, United States
- Genres: Chicago blues
- Occupation(s): Guitarist, saxophonist, keyboardist, singer
- Instrument(s): Guitar, saxophone, keyboards, vocals
- Years active: 1968–present
- Labels: Alligator, Blue Phoenix, Blue Suit

Maurice John Vaughn (born May 10, 1952) is an American blues musician from Chicago, Illinois, United States. He is a guitarist, saxophonist, keyboardist and singer.

== Biography ==
Vaughn began playing professionally in 1968 as a saxophonist in Chicago R&B groups. He recorded with the Chosen Few in 1976, and played and recorded with Phil Guy, went on tour in Canada in 1979. He played as a sideman with Luther Allison, Son Seals, Junior Wells, Valerie Wellington, and A.C. Reed.

His debut solo record was 1984's Generic Blues Album, released in plain white packaging on his own Reecy Records record label; Alligator Records reissued it in 1987. In the 1990s, Vaughn played with Detroit Junior, but spent much of his time working in A&R for Appaloosa Records, and produced albums by Shirley Johnson, Zoom, Maxine Carr, B.J. Emery, and Velvet McNair. Vaughn and his band backed up Detroit Junior on the latter's two releases on Blue Suit Records, Turn Up The Heat (1995) and Take Out The Time (1997). In 1994, his song "(Everything I Do) Got To Be Funky" was released on the soundtrack for the film, Major League II. The song was also a part of his 1993 release, In the Shadow of the City.

== Discography ==
- Generic Blues Album (Reecy Records, 1984; reissued Alligator Records)
- I Got Money (Blue Phoenix, 1986) (with A.C. Reed)
- In the Shadow of the City (Alligator, 1993)
- Dangerous Road (Blue Suit, 2001)
