= Ann Rabson =

American singer

- Born: April 12, 1945; New York City, United States
- Died: January 30, 2013 (aged 67) Fredericksburg, Virginia, United States
- Genres: Blues
- Occupations: Vocalist, pianist, guitarist, songwriter
- Label: Alligator Records

Ann Rabson (April 12, 1945 – January 30, 2013) was an American blues vocalist, pianist and guitar player. She was a solo recording artist signed to Alligator Records and was a member of Saffire - The Uppity Blues Women, an acoustic blues band that disbanded amicably in 2009.

== Life ==
Born in New York City in 1945, Rabson had been playing and singing the blues professionally since 1962. She also performed as a solo act and with various other bands.

She had been nominated eight times for a Blues Music Award (formerly W.C. Handy Award) as Traditional Blues Female Artist of the Year. Her first solo album, Music Makin' Mama, was nominated as Album of the Year in both the Traditional Blues and Acoustic Blues categories, and her composition "Elevator Man" was nominated as Song of the Year.

Rabson's second solo album, Struttin' My Stuff, was released by M.C. Records in September 2000. Her joint album with Bob Margolin, Not Alone, won a Blues Music Award in 2013 in the 'Acoustic Album' category.

Rabson died on January 30, 2013, in Fredericksburg, Virginia, after a long battle with cancer. She was 67.

== Discography ==
- Music Makin' Mama – (1997) on Alligator Records
- Struttin' My Stuff – (2000) on M.C. Records
- In A Family Way – (2005) on Emit Doog Music
- Not Alone – (2012) (with Bob Margolin) on Vizztone Records

== Discography with Saffire – The Uppity Blues Women ==
- Middle Age Blues (self-produced cassette, 1987)
- Uppity Blues Women (1990)
- Hot Flash (1991)
- Broad Casting (1992)
- Old, New, Borrowed & Blue (1994)
- Cleaning House (1996)
- Live & Uppity (1998)
- Ain't Gonna Hush (2001)
- Deluxe Edition (compilation, 2006)
- Havin' The Last Word (2009)
