= Saffire – The Uppity Blues Women =

American band

Saffire – The Uppity Blues Women was a three-woman blues musical ensemble in the Washington, D.C. area. It was founded in 1984 by Ann Rabson, Gaye Adegbalola and Earlene Lewis. Lewis separated from the band in 1992 and was replaced by Andra Faye. The group then featured Rabson on piano, vocals and guitar, Adegbalola on vocals and guitar, and Faye on vocals, bass, mandolin, violin and guitar.

Saffire's music was a combination of serious blues songs and comedic novelty songs. They covered original songs (such as "Do Your Duty" by Wesley 'Sox' Wilson, "You Got to Know How" by Sippie Wallace & Jack Viertel, and "Don't You Tell Me"), as well as the music of blueswomen who had inspired them, such as Big Mama Thornton, Ida Cox and Koko Taylor. Their music, both comedic and serious, tends to deal with feminist themes, which has made them popular outside of traditional blues circles.

Saffire was the first acoustic band to be signed by Alligator Records. Their song "Middle Aged Blues Boogie," written by Adegbalola, was named best original song at the W.C. Handy Awards (now the Blues Music Awards) in 1990. Saffire has shared the stage with B.B. King, Ray Charles, Willie Dixon and Koko Taylor.

An announcement on the group's website in November, 2009, stated Saffire had retired and amicably disbanded. Rabson died on January 30, 2013, in Fredericksburg, Virginia, after a long battle with cancer. She was 67.

Andra Faye is now living and playing in the Indianapolis, Indiana area.

== Discography ==
- Middle Age Blues (self-produced cassette, 1987)
- Uppity Blues Women (1990)
- Hot Flash (1991)
- Broad Casting (1992)
- Old, New, Borrowed & Blue (1994)
- Cleaning House (1996)
- Live & Uppity (1998)
- Ain't Gonna Hush (2001)
- Deluxe Edition (compilation, 2006)
- Havin' The Last Word (2009)
