= Son Seals =

American blues guitarist and singer (1942–2004)

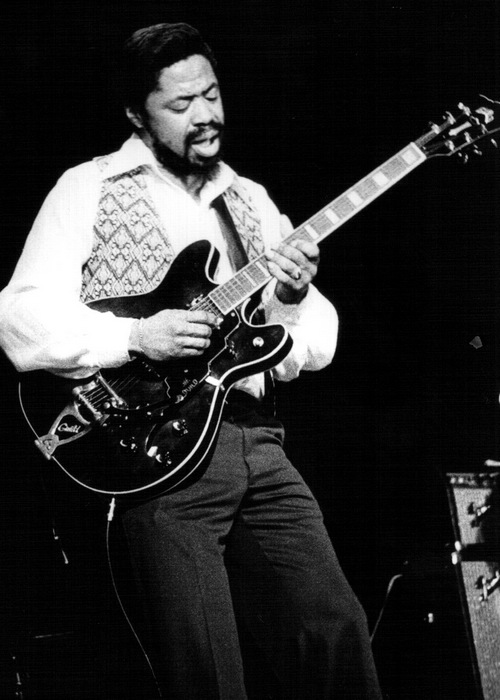
- Seals in 1977

Background information
- Born: Frank Seals; August 14, 1942; Osceola, Arkansas, United States
- Died: December 20, 2004 (aged 62) Chicago, Illinois, United States
- Genres: Electric blues
- Occupations: Guitarist, drummer, singer
- Instruments: Guitar, vocals, banjo, drums
- Years active: 1959–2004
- Label: Alligator Records

Frank "Son" Seals (August 13, 1942 – December 20, 2004) was an American electric blues guitarist and singer. He was inducted into the Blues Hall of Fame in 2009.

== Career ==
Seals was born in Osceola, Arkansas, where his father, Jim "Son" Seals, owned a small juke joint, called the Dipsy Doodle Club. He began performing professionally by the age of 13, first as a drummer with Robert Nighthawk and later as a guitarist. At age 16, he began to play at the T-99, a local upper-echelon club, with his brother-in-law Walter "Little Walter" Jefferson. He played there with prominent blues musicians, including Albert King, Rufus Thomas, Bobby Bland, Junior Parker, and Rosco Gordon. Their varying styles contributed to the development of Seals's own playing techniques. While playing at the T-99, he was also introduced to country-western music by Jimmy Grubbs, who occasionally asked Seals to play the drums or guitar with his group. At the age of 19, Seals formed his own band, Son Seals and the Upsetters, to fill in at the Rebel Club, in Osceola. The band members were Johnny Moore ("Old Man Horse") on piano; Alvin Goodberry on drums, guitar, bass, or piano; Little Bob Robinson on vocals; and Walter Lee "Skinny Dynamo" Harris on piano. Shortly thereafter, a man from Little Rock, Arkansas, came to find "Little Walter" for a gig at his club, but when Walter turned it down the offer went to Seals.

In 1971, Seals moved to Chicago. His career took off after he was discovered by Bruce Iglauer of Alligator Records at the Flamingo Club on Chicago's South Side. His debut album, The Son Seals Blues Band, was released in 1973. The album included "Your Love Is Like a Cancer" and "Hot Sauce". It was followed by Midnight Son (1976) and Live and Burning (1978). Seals released several albums in the next two decades, all but one on Alligator Records, including Chicago Fire (1980), Bad Axe (1984), Living in the Danger Zone (1991), Nothing but the Truth (1994) and Live: Spontaneous Combustion (1996). He received W.C. Handy Awards in 1985, 1987, and 2001.

The writer Andrew Vachss, a friend of his, used his influence to promote Seals's music. Vachss gave Seals several cameo appearances in his novels, and co-wrote songs with him for his album Lettin' Go, released in 2000. Vachss dedicated his novel Mask Market to Seals's memory.

In 2002, Seals contributed to the Bo Diddley tribute album, Hey Bo Diddley – A Tribute!, performing the song "My Story" (also known as "Story of Bo Diddley").

Seals had a hard life. He survived all but one of his fourteen siblings. In 1997 he was shot in the jaw by his wife, sustaining injuries which required reconstructive surgery. In 1999 part of his left leg was amputated as a result of complications from diabetes. He lost belongings in a fire that destroyed his home while he was away performing, and several of his prized guitars were stolen from his home. After his health began to decline, Seals toured with accompaniment by several different bands, including those of James Soleberg, Jimmy Vivino, and Big Jim Kohler.

The band Phish performed Seals's song "Funky Bitch" and brought him on stage on several occasions. In 1999, Seals performed at Camp Oswego, the only one of Phish's multi-day summer festivals that included performances by artists other than themselves.

Seals died in 2004, at the age of 62, from complications of diabetes.

In 2009, Seals was inducted into the Blues Hall of Fame, in the category 'Performer'.

== Discography ==
Year	Album	Label
1973	The Son Seals Blues Band	Alligator
1976	Midnight Son	Alligator
1978	Live and Burning	Alligator
1980	Chicago Fire	Alligator
1984	Bad Axe	Alligator
1991	Living in the Danger Zone	Alligator
1994	Nothing but the Truth	Alligator
1996	Live: Spontaneous Combustion	Alligator
2000	Lettin' Go	Telarc
2002	Deluxe Edition	Alligator

== See also ==
- List of blues musicians
- List of Chicago blues musicians
