= Nothing but the Truth (Son Seals album) =

Studio album by Son Seals
- Released: 1994
- Genre: Blues
- Label: Alligator

Nothing but the Truth is the sixth studio album (and seventh album) by Son Seals, produced by Seals and Bruce Iglauer and released by Alligator Records in 1994. Seals wrote only four songs: "Life Is Hard", "I'm Gonna Take It All Back", "Frank and Johnnie", and "Little Sally Walker". The rest of the album consists of cover songs, including Hound Dog Taylor's "Sadie". John Randolph played rhythm guitar; Red Groetzinger and Dan Rabinovitz, horns; Noel Neal and Johnny B. Gayden, bass; David Russell, drums.

== Critical reception ==
Professional ratings
Review scores
Source	Rating
The Penguin Guide to Blues Recordings	3.5/4 stars

Bill Dahl, writing for AllMusic, called its front cover "grotesque [and] an abomination." Rolling Stone rated it four and half stars out of five.

== Track listing ==
1. "Adding Up" – 5:07
2. "Good Woman Bad" – 4:38
3. "Before the Bullets Fly" – 4:19
4. "I'm Gonna Take It All Back" – 6:05
5. "Life Is Hard" – 4:12
6. "Tough As Nails" – 3:09
7. "Your Friends" – 6:13
8. "Sadie" – 6:07
9. "Frank And Johnnie" – 4:26
10. "Can't Hear Nothing But The Blues" – 6:35
11. "Little Sally Walker" – 4:34
12. "Tricks Of The Trade" – 4:41
