= Alligator Records =

American blues record label

- Founded: 1971; 55 years ago
- Founder: Bruce Iglauer
- Distributors: ADA (US), Warner Music (Canada)
- Genre: Blues
- Country of origin: U.S.
- Location: Chicago, Illinois
- Official website: www.alligator.com

Alligator Records is an American, Chicago-based independent blues record label founded by Bruce Iglauer in 1971. Iglauer was also one of the founders of the Living Blues magazine in Chicago in 1970.

== History ==
Iglauer started the label using his savings to record and produce his favorite band Hound Dog Taylor and the HouseRockers, whom his employer, Bob Koester of Delmark Records, declined to record. Nine months after the release of this first album, he stopped working at Delmark Records to concentrate fully on the band and his label. Only 1,000 copies of the Taylor's debut album were made, while Iglauer took over managing the group. Other early releases for the fledgling label included recordings by Big Walter Horton with Carey Bell and Fenton Robinson. In 1976, Koko Taylor's I Got What It Takes was nominated for a Grammy Award, and Albert Collins soon signed to the label. Iglauer mainly worked as executive producer.

In 1982, the label won its first Grammy Award for the album, I'm Here, by Clifton Chenier. The second Grammy came in 1985 for Showdown! by Albert Collins, Johnny Copeland, and Robert Cray. In 1991, a 20th anniversary compilation album was issued.

Since its founding, Alligator Records has released over 250 blues and blues/rock albums, as well as a defunct reggae series. Alligator artists include Lonnie Mack, Marcia Ball, Koko Taylor, Lonnie Brooks, Lil' Ed & The Blues Imperials, Eddy Clearwater, Sam Lay, Smokin' Joe Kubek, Roomful of Blues, Eric Lindell, JJ Grey & Mofro, Lee Rocker, Cephas & Wiggins, and Michael Burks. More recently, veterans Charlie Musselwhite and James Cotton have re-signed to the label.

Alligator celebrated its 40th anniversary in 2011 while reporting a profit for the previous year. In January 2021, Exceleration Records invested in Alligator, becoming a financial and administrative partner with Iglauer. In 2021, Alligator celebrated its 50th anniversary, in observance of which Chicago Mayor Lori Lightfoot declared June 18, 2021 as “Alligator Records Day” in Chicago, and U.S. Rep. Jan Schakowsky added comments on Iglauer's and Alligator's part in the "American cultural legacy of Chicago blues music" to the Congressional Record.

In 2026, the 55th anniversary of Alligator Records was celebrated on the second day of the Chicago Blues Festival with a City of Chicago proclamation presented by Chicago Mayor Brandon Johnson recognizing Bruce Iglauer (who, in turn, called the staff of Alligator Records to the stage to share in the recognition) and with an evening of music by various artists.

== Discography ==
Alligator Records commenced releasing LPs in 1971 continuing through to the present with a focus on Chicago blues artists.

=== Blues ===
Catalog No. (AL)	Album	Artist	Details
4701	Hound Dog Taylor and the HouseRockers	Hound Dog Taylor	
4702	Big Walter Horton with Carey Bell	Big Walter Horton and Carey Bell	
4703	The Son Seals Blues Band	Son Seals	
4704	Natural Boogie	Hound Dog Taylor	
4705	Somebody Loan Me a Dime	Fenton Robinson	
4706	I Got What It Takes	Koko Taylor	
4707	Beware of the Dog	Hound Dog Taylor	
4708	Midnight Son	Son Seals	
4709	Stomping on a Saturday Night	Blind John Davis	
4710	I Hear Some Blues Downstairs	Fenton Robinson	
4711	The Earthshaker	Koko Taylor	
4712	Live and Burning	Son Seals	
4713	Ice Pickin'	Albert Collins	
4714	Bayou Lightning	Lonnie Brooks	
4715	Someday You'll Have These Blues	Phillip Walker	reissue of Joliet LP
4716	Been Gone Too Long	Lonesome Sundown	reissue of Joliet LP
4717	Johnny Jones with Billy Boy Arnold	Johnny Jones and Billy Boy Arnold	
4718	Crawfish Fiesta	Professor Longhair	
4719	Frostbite	Albert Collins	
4720	Chicago Fire	Son Seals	
4721	Turn On the Night	Lonnie Brooks	
4722	Condition: Blue	Tony Mathews	
4723	Stone Crazy!	Buddy Guy	
4724	From the Heart of a Woman	Koko Taylor	
4725	Frozen Alive!	Albert Collins	
4726	The New Johnny Otis Show with Shuggie Otis	Johnny Otis and Shuggie Otis	
4727	Genuine Houserocking Music	Hound Dog Taylor	
4728	Raw Magic	Magic Slim	
4729	I'm Here!	Clifton Chenier and His Red Hot Louisiana Band	
4730	Don't Lose Your Cool	Albert Collins	
4731	Hot Shot	Lonnie Brooks	
4732	Playing for Keeps	Big Twist and the Mellow Fellows	
4733	Live in Japan	Albert Collins	
4734	Whoopin'	Sonny Terry	with Johnny Winter and Willie Dixon; reissue of Mad Albino LP
4735	Guitar Slinger	Johnny Winter	
4736	Nightflight	Fenton Robinson	
4737	High Compression	James Cotton	
4738	Bad Axe	Son Seals	
4739	Strike Like Lightning	Lonnie Mack	
4740	Queen of the Blues	Koko Taylor	
4741	When a Guitar Plays the Blues	Roy Buchanan	
4742	Serious Business	Johnny Winter	
4743	Showdown!	Albert Collins, Robert Cray and Johnny Copeland	
4744	Bar Room Preacher	Jimmy Johnson	reissue of Blue Phoenix LP
4745	Pressure Cooker	Clarence "Gatemouth" Brown	
4746	Live from Chicago - Mr. Superharp Himself!	James Cotton	
4747	Dancing on the Edge	Roy Buchanan	
4748	3rd Degree	Johnny Winter	
4749	Roughhousin'	Lil' Ed & the Blues Imperials	
4750	Second Sight	Lonnie Mack	
4751	Wound Up Tight	Lonnie Brooks	
4752	Cold Snap	Albert Collins	
4753	All the Way Crazy	Little Charlie & the Nightcats	
4754	An Audience with the Queen	Koko Taylor	
4755	Live from Chicago! Bigger Than Life!!	Big Twist and the Mellow Fellows	
4756	Hot Wires	Roy Buchanan	
4757	I'm in the Wrong Business!	A.C. Reed	
4758	Edge of the City	The Kinsey Report	
4759	Live from Chicago: Bayou Lightning Strikes	Lonnie Brooks	
4760	The Siegel–Schwall Reunion Concert	Siegel–Schwall Band	
4761	Disturbing the Peace	Little Charlie & the Nightcats	
4762	Years Since Yesterday	The Paladins	
4763	Generic Blues Album	Maurice John Vaughn	reissue of Reecy LP
4764	Big News from Baton Rouge!!	Kenny Neal	
4765	Georgia Blue	Tinsley Ellis	
4766	The Swamp Boogie Queen	Katie Webster	
4767	Big Fun	Elvin Bishop	
4768	Harp and Soul	Lazy Lester	
4769	That Woman is Poison!	Rufus Thomas	
4770	Lucky Strikes!	Lucky Peterson	
4771	One More for the Road	Charles Brown	reissue of Blue Side LP
4772	Chicken, Gravy and Biscuits	Lil' Ed & the Blues Imperials	
4773	Live from Austin	Delbert McClinton	
4774	Devil Child	Kenny Neal	
4775	Midnight Drive	The Kinsey Report	
4776	The Big Break	Little Charlie & the Nightcats	
4777	Two-Fisted Mama	Katie Webster	
4778	Fanning the Flames	Tinsley Ellis	
4779	Standing My Ground	Clarence "Gatemouth" Brown	
4780	The Uppity Blues Women	Saffire – The Uppity Blues Women	
4781	Ace of Harps	Charlie Musselwhite	
4782	Let's Buzz!	The Paladins	
4783	Louisiana Legend	Raful Neal	reissue of King Snake LP
4784	Jump for Joy	Koko Taylor	
4785	Return of the Thin Man	Noble "Thin Man" Watts	reissue of King Snake LP
4786	Live! Attack of the Killer V	Lonnie Mack	
4787	Keep It To Ourselves	Sonny Boy Williamson	recorded in 1963; reissue of Storyville LP
4788	Blowin' Like Hell	William Clarke	
4789	Triple Play	Lucky Peterson	
4790	Harp Attack!	James Cotton, Carey Bell, Junior Wells and Billy Branch	
4791	Don't Let the Bossman Get You Down!	Elvin Bishop	
4792	Tore Up!	Nappy Brown	with the Heartfixers; reissue of Landslide LP
4793	Street Party	The Mellow Fellows	
4794	Captured Live	Little Charlie & the Nightcats	
4795	Walking On Fire	Kenny Neal	
4796	Hot Flash	Saffire – The Uppity Blues Women	
4797	Lost in the Blues	Otis Rush	reissue of Sonet LP
4798	Living in the Danger Zone	Son Seals	
4799	Satisfaction Guaranteed	Lonnie Brooks	
4800	The Touch	Johnny Heartsman	
4801	Signature	Charlie Musselwhite	
4802	Alone & Acoustic	Buddy Guy and Junior Wells	reissue of Isabel LP
4803	No Foolin'!	Katie Webster	
4804	No Looking Back	Clarence "Gatemouth" Brown	
4805	Trouble Time	Tinsley Ellis	
4806	Serious Intentions	William Clarke	
4807	Short Fuse Blues	Dave Hole	reissue of Black Cat LP
4808	...What You See Is What You Get	Lil' Ed & the Blues Imperials	
4809	Bayou Blood	Kenny Neal	
4810	Women Be Wise	Sippie Wallace	reissue of Storyville LP
4811	Broadcasting	Saffire − The Uppity Blues Women	
4812	Night Vision	Little Charlie & the Nightcats	
4813	In the Shadow of the City	Maurice John Vaughn	
4814	Working Overtime	Dave Hole	
4815	Back Where I Belong	Billy Boy Arnold	
4816	Down in the Alley	Bob Margolin	
4817	Force of Nature	Koko Taylor	
4818	In My Time	Charlie Musselwhite	
4819	Blue Blazes	Sugar Blue	
4820	Soul Fixin' Man	Luther Allison	reissue of Ruf LP
4821	Bloodlines	Michael Hill's Blues Mob	
4822	Nothing but the Truth	Son Seals	
4823	Storm Warning	Tinsley Ellis	
4824	Corky Siegel's Chamber Blues	Corky Siegel	
4825	Hoodoo Moon	Kenny Neal	
4826	Old, New, Borrowed & Blue	Saffire − The Uppity Blues Women	
4827	Groove Time	William Clarke	
4828	Deep Down	Carey Bell	
4829	Straight Up!	Little Charlie & the Nightcats	
4830	Too Much Fun	C. J. Chenier and the Red Hot Louisiana Band	
4831	In Your Eyes	Sugar Blue	
4832	Steel on Steel	Dave Hole	
4833	Ace in the Hole	Elvin Bishop	
4834	Blue Streak	Luther Allison	
4835	My Blues & My Guitar	Bob Margolin	
4836	Eldorado Cadillac	Billy Boy Arnold	
4837	Between Midnight and Day	Corey Harris	
4838	Cool Down	Cephas & Wiggins	
4839	Border Town Legend	Long John Hunter	
4840	Cleaning House	Saffire − The Uppity Blues Women	
4841	Wake Up and Live!	Floyd Dixon	
4842	The Hard Way	William Clarke	
4843	Roadhouse Rules	Lonnie Brooks	
4844	The Big Squeeze	C. J. Chenier and the Red Hot Louisiana Band	
4845	Have Mercy!	Michael Hill's Blues Mob	
4846	Son Seals Live: Spontaneous Combustion	Son Seals	
4847	Ticket to Chicago	Dave Hole	
4848	Music Makin' Mama	Ann Rabson	
4849	Reckless	Luther Allison	
4850	Fish Ain't Bitin'	Corey Harris	
4851	Up and In	Bob Margolin	
4852	Fire It Up	Tinsley Ellis	
4853	Swinging from the Rafters	Long John Hunter	
4854	Good Luck Man	Carey Bell	
4855	Hound Dog Taylor: A Tribute	Various Artists	
4856	Live & Uppity	Saffire − The Uppity Blues Women	
4857	Turn the Heat Up	Shemekia Copeland	
4858	New York State of Blues	Michael Hill's Blues Mob	
4859	The Skin I'm In	Elvin Bishop	
4860	Smoke and Steel	The Kinsey Report	
4861	Ride with Me	Long John Hunter	
4862	Shadow of the Blues	Little Charlie & the Nightcats	
4863	Homemade	Cephas & Wiggins	
4864	Greens from the Garden	Corey Harris	
4865	Under the Spell	Dave Hole	
4866	Lone Star Shootout	Lonnie Brooks, Long John Hunter and Phillip Walker	
4867	Front Porch Blues	John Jackson	
4868	Get Wild!	Lil' Ed & the Blues Imperials	
4869	Live in Chicago	Luther Allison	reissue of Ruf LP
4870	Bitter Sweet Blues	Gaye Adegbalola	
4871	Suspicion	Coco Montoya	
4872	Vü-Dü Menz	Corey Harris and Henry Butler	
4873	Royal Blue	Koko Taylor	
4874	That's My Partner!	Elvin Bishop and Little Smokey Smothers	
4875	Wicked	Shemekia Copeland	
4876	The Chill	Rusty Zinn	
4877	Speaking in Tongues	The Holmes Brothers	
4878	Make It Rain	Michael Burks	
4879	Presumed Innocent	Marcia Ball	
4880	Ain't Gonna Hush!	Saffire − The Uppity Blues Women	
4881	Outside Looking In	Dave Hole	
4882	Step It Up!	C. J. Chenier and the Red Hot Louisiana Band	
4883	That's Big!	Little Charlie & the Nightcats	
4884	From Austin with Soul	W. C. Clark	
4885	Can't Look Back	Coco Montoya	
4886	Heads Up!	Lil' Ed & the Blues Imperials	
4887	Talking to Strangers	Shemekia Copeland	
4888	Somebody Told the Truth	Cephas & Wiggins	
4889	That's Right!	Roomful of Blues	
4890	The Live One	Dave Hole	
4891	So Many Rivers	Marcia Ball	
4892	I Smell Smoke	Michael Burks	
4993	Simple Truths	The Holmes Brothers	
4894	Double Take	Kenny Neal and Billy Branch	
4895	Watch Your Back	Guitar Shorty	
4896	Release the Hound	Hound Dog Taylor	
4897	Deep in the Heart	W. C. Clark	
4898	Second Nature	Carey Bell and Lurrie Bell	
4899	Have a Little Faith	Mavis Staples	
4900	Standing Room Only	Roomful of Blues	
4901	Corky Siegel's Traveling Chamber Blues Show!	Corky Siegel	
4902	Nine Lives	Little Charlie & the Nightcats	
4903	Live! Down the Road	Marcia Ball	
4904	Live − Highwayman	Tinsley Ellis	
4905	The Soul Truth	Shemekia Copeland	
4906	Flash Forward	The Siegel-Schwall Band	
4907	Racin' the Devil	Lee Rocker	reissue of Hypertension LP
4908	Change in the Weather	Eric Lindell	
4909	Rattleshake	Lil' Ed & the Blues Imperials	
4910	Shoulder to Shoulder	Cephas & Wiggins	
4911	We The People	Guitar Shorty	
4912	State of Grace	The Holmes Brothers	
4913	Dirty Deal	Coco Montoya	
4914	Country Ghetto	JJ Grey & Mofro	
4915	Old School	Koko Taylor	
4916	Moment of Truth	Tinsley Ellis	
4917	Black Cat Bone	Lee Rocker	
4918	Low on Cash, Rich in Love	Eric Lindell	
4919	Raisin' a Ruckus	Roomful of Blues	
4920	Blood Brothers	Smokin' Joe Kubek and Bnois King	
4921	West Side Strut	Eddy Clearwater	
4922	Peace, Love & BBQ	Marcia Ball	
4923	Iron Man	Michael Burks	
4924	What Love Will Do	Janiva Magness	
4925	Orange Blossoms	JJ Grey & Mofro	
4926	Full Tilt	Lil' Ed & the Blues Imperials	
4927	Havin' the Last Word	Saffire − The Uppity Blues Women	
4928	Gulf Coast Highway	Eric Lindell	
4929	Lay Your Burden Down	Buckwheat Zydeco	
4930	Twisted	Rick Estrin & The Nightcats	Produced by Kid Andersen
4931	Hard Believer	Tommy Castro	
4932	Speak No Evil	Tinsley Ellis	
4933	Feed My Soul	The Holmes Brothers	
4934	Bare Knuckle	Guitar Shorty	
4935	The Devil is an Angel Too	Janiva Magness	
4936	American Patchwork	Anders Osborne	
4937	Have Blues, Will Travel	Smokin' Joe Kubek and Bnois King	
4938	Georgia Warhorse	JJ Grey & Mofro	
4939	The Well	Charlie Musselwhite	
4940	Giant	James Cotton	
4941	Hook, Line & Sinker	Roomful of Blues	
4942	Roadside Attractions	Marcia Ball	
4943	The Legendary Rhythm & Blues Revue Live!	Various Artists	
4944	Brighter Days: The Film and Live Concert Album	JJ Grey & Mofro	CD and DVD
4945	Hellfire	Joe Louis Walker	
4946	Stronger For It	Janiva Magness	
4947	Soul Shot	Curtis Salgado	
4948	Black Eye Galaxy	Anders Osborne	
4949	Jump Start	Lil' Ed & the Blues Imperials	
4950	One Wrong Turn	Rick Estrin & The Nightcats	Produced by Kid Andersen
4951	Show of Strength	Michael Burks	
4952	On My Mind / In My Heart	Jesse Dee	
4953	This River	JJ Grey & Mofro	
4954	Cotton Mouth Man	James Cotton	
4955	45 Live	Roomful of Blues	
4956	Peace	Anders Osborne	
4957	Brotherhood	The Holmes Brothers	
4958	The Devil You Know	Tommy Castro and the Pain Killers	
4959	Hornet's Nest	Joe Louis Walker	
4960	Refuse to Lose	Jarekus Singleton	
4961	Don't Call No Ambulance	Selwyn Birchwood	
4962	You Asked For It...Live!	Rick Estrin & The Nightcats	Produced by Kid Andersen
4963	Can't Even Do Wrong Right	Elvin Bishop	
4964	The Tattooed Lady and the Alligator Man	Marcia Ball	
4965	Meet Me in Bluesland	The Kentucky Headhunters with Johnnie Johnson	
4966	Outskirts of Love	Shemekia Copeland	
4967	Method to My Madness	Tommy Castro and the Painkillers	
4968	God Don't Never Change: The Songs of Blind Willie Johnson	Various Artists	
4969	The Chicago Way	Toronzo Cannon	
4970	The Beautiful Lowdown	Curtis Salgado	
4971	Promised Land or Bust	Moreland and Arbuckle	
4972	The Big Sound of Lil' Ed & the Blues Imperials	Lil' Ed & the Blues Imperials	
4973	Elvin Bishop's Big Fun Trio	Elvin Bishop	
4974	Hard Truth	Coco Montoya	
4975	Pick Your Poison	Selwyn Birchwood	
4976	Royal Mint	The Cash Box Kings	
4977	Groovin' in Greaseland	Rick Estrin & The Nightcats	Produced by Kid Andersen
4978	Stompin' Ground	Tommy Castro and the Painkillers	
4979	Winning Hand	Tinsley Ellis	
4980	Rough Cut	Curtis Salgado and Alan Hager	
4981	The High Cost of Low Living	Nick Moss Band featuring Dennis Gruenling	
4982	Shine Bright	Marcia Ball	
4983	Something Smells Funky Round Here	Elvin Bishop	
4984	America's Child	Shemekia Copeland	
4985	Revolution in Your Heart	Eric Lindell	
4986	Tough as Love	Lindsay Beaver	
4987	Journeys to the Heart of the Blues	Joe Louis Walker, Bruce Katz and Giles Robson	
4988	Live at the Ramblin' Man Fair	The Kentucky Headhunters	
4989	Killin' It Live	Tommy Castro and the Painkillers	
4990	Kingfish	Christone "Kingfish" Ingram	
4991	Hail to the Kings!	The Cash Box Kings	
4992	Roots and Branches: The Songs of Little Walter	Billy Branch	
4993	Lucky Guy!	Nick Moss Band featuring Dennis Gruenling	
4994	Coming in Hot	Coco Montoya	
4995	The Preacher, the Politician or the Pimp	Toronzo Cannon	
4996	Contemporary	Rick Estrin & The Nightcats	Produced by Kid Andersen
4997	Ice Cream In Hell	Tinsley Ellis	
4998	In a Roomfull of Blues	Roomfull of Blues	
4999	Living In a Burning House	Selwyn Birchwood	
5000	Alligator Records — 50 Years of Genuine Houserockin' Music	Various Artists	
5001	Uncivil War	Shemekia Copeland	
5002	Damage Control	Curtis Salgado	
5003	Raisin' Cain	Chris Cain	
5004	100 Years of Blues	Elvin Bishop & Charlie Musselwhite	
5005	662	Christone "Kingfish" Ingram	
5006	A Bluesman Came to Town (A Blues Odyssey)	Tommy Castro	
5007	Tempting Fate	Carolyn Wonderland	Produced by Dave Alvin
5008	Devil May Care	Tinsley Ellis	
5009	Mississippi Son	Charlie Musselwhite	
5010	Done Come Too Far	Shemekia Copeland	
5011	Oscar's Motel	The Cash Box Kings	
5012	Exorcist	Selwyn Birchwood	
5013	Get Your Back Into It!	Nick Moss Band featuring Dennis Gruenling	
5014	Writing on the Wall	Coco Montoya	
5015	Live in London	Christone "Kingfish" Ingram	
5016	The Hard Line	Chris O'Leary	
5017	Naked Truth	Tinsley Ellis	
5018	Olustee	JJ Grey & Mofro	
5019	The Hits Keep Coming	Rick Estrin & the Nightcats	Produced by Kid Andersen
5020	Shut Up & Play!	Toronzo Cannon	
5021	Good Intentions Gone Bad	Chris Cain	
5022	Blame It on Eve	Shemekia Copeland	
5023	Blues in My DNA	Ronnie Baker Brooks	
5024	Family	Southern Avenue	
5025	Closer to the Bone	Tommy Castro and the Painkillers	
5026	Truth Is	Carolyn Wonderland	Produced by Dave Alvin
5027	Talkin' Heavy	D.K. Harrell	
5028	Steppin' Out!	Roomful of Blues	
5029	Electric Swamp Funkin' Blues	Selwyn Birchwood	
5030	Slideways	Lil' Ed & the Blues Imperials	
5031	Labor of Love	Tinsley Ellis	
5032	Blue Collar	Chris O'Leary	

=== Misc. ===
Catalog No. (AL)	Album	Artist	Details
101	Genuine Houserockin' Music	Various Artists	
102	Genuine Houserockin' Music II	Various Artists	
103	Genuine Houserockin' Music III	Various Artists	
104	Genuine Houserockin' Music IV	Various Artists	
105/6	The Alligator Records 20th Anniversary Collection	Various Artists	
107/8	20th Anniversary Tour	Various Artists	
109	Genuine Houserockin' Music V	Various Artists	
110/11	The Alligator Records 25th Anniversary Collection	Various Artists	
112/13	Alligator Records 30th Anniversary Collection	Various Artists	
114	Crucial Guitar Blues	Various Artists	
115	Crucial Harmonica Blues	Various Artists	
116	Crucial Chicago Blues	Various Artists	
117	Crucial Slide Guitar Blues	Various Artists	
118	Crucial Texas Blues	Various Artists	
119	Crucial Live! Blues	Various Artists	
120/21	Alligator Records 35X35	Various Artists	
122	Crucial Rockin' Blues	Various Artists	
123	More Crucial Guitar Blues	Various Artists	
124	Crucial Acoustic Blues	Various Artists	
125/26	Alligator Records 40th Anniversary Collection	Various Artists	
127/28	Alligator Records 45th Anniversary Collection	Various Artists	
1201	There Is No Excuse (For Not Serving The Lord)	Prince Dixon with the Jackson Southernaires	reissue of Joliet LP
2700	Clownin' With The World	Sonny Boy Williamson / Willie Love	reissue of Trumpet LP
2701	Strange Kind Of Feelin'	Jerry "Boogie" McCain / Tiny Kennedy / Clayton Love	reissue of Trumpet LP
2702	Delta Blues 1951	Big Joe Williams / Willie Love / Luther Huff	reissue of Trumpet LP
2800	Shout, Brother, Shout!	Various Artists	
2801	In The Spirit	Various Artists	
2802	Deep South Gospel	The Southern Sons	
2803	Goin' In Your Direction	Sonny Boy Williamson / Arthur "Big Boy" Crudup / Willie Love / Bobo "Slim" Thomas	reissue of Trumpet LP
3901	Dr. John's Gumbo	Dr. John	reissue of Atco LP
3902	Honky Tonkin' (I Done Me Some) (Classic Recordings From 1974-76)	Delbert McClinton	LP compilation of ABC Records material
3903	The Wham of That Memphis Man!	Lonnie Mack	reissue of Elektra LP
3904	Gris-Gris	Dr. John, The Night Tripper	reissue of Atco LP
3905	Cool on It	Tinsley Ellis & the Heartfixers	reissue of Landslide LP
3906	Blackwater	Mofro	reissue of Fog City LP
3907	Lochloosa	Mofro	reissue of Fog City LP
3908	The Choice Cuts	JJ Grey & Mofro	LP compilation
3909	It's My Life, Baby	Johnny Winter	LP compilation
3910	Crown Jewels	Koko Taylor	LP compilation
5601	Deluxe Edition	Albert Collins	CD compilation
5602	Deluxe Edition	Lonnie Brooks	CD compilation
5603	Deluxe Edition	Little Charlie & the Nightcats	CD compilation
5604	Deluxe Edition	Kenny Neal	CD compilation
5605	Deluxe Edition	Hound Dog Taylor and the Houserockers	CD compilation
5606	Deluxe Edition	Katie Webster	CD compilation
5607	Deluxe Edition	William Clarke	CD compilation
5608	Deluxe Edition	Roy Buchanan	CD compilation
5609	Deluxe Edition	Johnny Winter	CD compilation
5610	Deluxe Edition	Koko Taylor	CD compilation
5611	Deluxe Edition	Son Seals	CD compilation
5612	Deluxe Edition	Charlie Musselwhite	CD compilation
5613	Deluxe Edition	Saffire – The Uppity Blues Women	CD compilation
5614	Deluxe Edition	Shemekia Copeland	CD compilation
7701	Living Chicago Blues, Volume 1	Jimmy Johnson Blues Band / Eddie Shaw & the Wolf Gang / Left Hand Frank and his Blues Band	
7702	Living Chicago Blues, Volume 2	Carey Bell's Blues Harp Band / Magic Slim & the Teardrops / Johnny "Big Moose" Walker	
7703	Living Chicago Blues, Volume 3	Lonnie Brooks Blues Band / Pinetop Perkins with Sammy Lawhorn / The S.O.B. Band	
7704	Living Chicago Blues, Volume 4	A.C. Reed & the Spark Plugs / Scotty & the Rib Tips / Lovie Lee with Carey Bell	
7705	Living Chicago Blues, Volume 5	Lacy Gibson / Big Leon Brooks' Blues Harp Band / Andrew Brown	
7706	Living Chicago Blues, Volume 6	Detroit Junior / Luther "Guitar Junior" Johnson / Queen Sylvia Embry	
7707	The New Bluebloods (The Next Generation of Chicago Blues)	Various Artists	
9201	The Alligator Records Christmas Collection	Various Artists	
9202	Genuine Houserockin' Christmas	Various Artists	
9203	A Blues Christmas	Various Artists	
9301	Blues Deluxe	Various Artists	
9901	Live at Waterloo Records (limited edition 7-song EP/CD)	Marcia Ball	

=== Reggae ===
Catalog No.	Album	Artist	Details
8301	Black Slate	Black Slate	reissue of Ensign LP
8302	Rasta Festival	Black Slate	
8303	Indestructible	Mighty Diamonds	
8304	Youthman Penitentiary	Edi Fitzroy and the Roots Radics Band	
8305	Forward	The Abyssinians	
8306	Check It!	Mutabaruka	
8307	King David's Melody	Augustus Pablo	
8308	In the Future	Pablo Moses	
8309	Scattered Lights	The Skatalites	
8310	Rockers All-Star Explosion	Various Artists	
8311	Tension	Pablo Moses	
8312	High Times All-Star Explosion	Various Artists	
8313	Triumph!	Joe Higgs	

== See also ==
- List of record labels
- Chicago record labels
- Mutabaruka
