= Bruce Iglauer =

American businessman and record producer (born 1947)

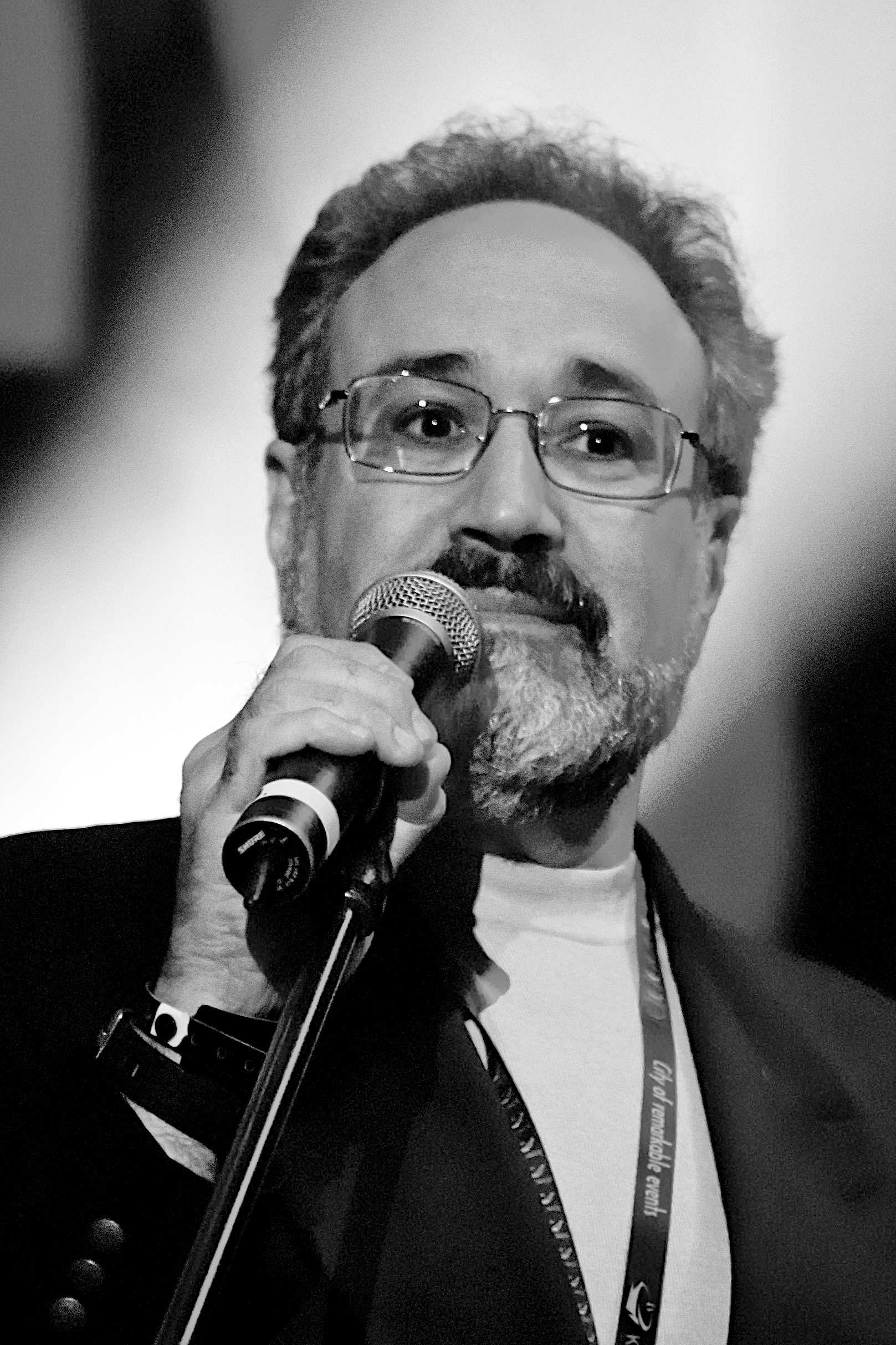
- Born: July 10, 1947 (age 79); Ann Arbor, Michigan, U.S.
- Occupation: Record producer
- Known for: Founder and CEO of Alligator Records

Bruce Iglauer (born July 10, 1947) is an American businessman and record producer who founded Alligator Records as an independent record label featuring blues music.

== Early life and career ==
Iglauer was born in Ann Arbor, Michigan, United States, and grew up in Grand Rapids, Michigan, and Wyoming, Ohio. He became interested in the blues during the mid-1960s while attending Lawrence University in Appleton, Wisconsin. He began hosting a college radio show, then moved on to promoting concerts at Lawrence by Howlin' Wolf and Luther Allison. He came to Chicago in 1966 as a “blues pilgrim” who wanted to check out the University of Chicago Folk Festival. He came to Bob Koester's attention and joined the Delmark Records staff in Chicago as a shipping clerk in 1970. He was a co-founder of Living Blues magazine in 1970. When Delmark declined Iglauer's advice to sign Hound Dog Taylor & The House Rockers, he recorded the group himself and, in so doing, created Alligator Records in 1971.

Nine months after the release of the first Alligator Records album, he left Delmark and continued at Alligator, making acclaimed recordings from Big Walter Horton, Son Seals, Fenton Robinson, Koko Taylor, Albert Collins, Lonnie Brooks, and many others. A breakthrough came in 1975 with Koko Taylor's "I Got What It Takes", which earned Alligator its first Grammy Award nomination. In 1978, he signed Albert Collins; in 1982, Clifton Chenier's "I'm Here!" won a Grammy. Recordings on Alligator by Hound Dog Taylor, Fenton Robinson, Albert Collins, Johnny Winter, Roy Buchanan, Clarence "Gatemouth" Brown, James Cotton, Charlie Musselwhite, Luther Allison, Shemekia Copeland, Roomful of Blues, Marcia Ball, Buckwheat Zydeco, and others have been Grammy-nominated. Showdown! by Albert Collins, Robert Cray, and Johnny Copeland won a Grammy for Best Blues Recording of 1987, and Buckwheat Zydeco's Lay Your Burden Down won a Grammy for Best Blues. Cajun or Zydeco Recording of 2009.

Iglauer has produced or co-produced over 125 albums in the Alligator Records catalog, including albums by Hound Dog Taylor, Son Seals, Koko Taylor, Fenton Robinson, Albert Collins, Johnny Winter, Roy Buchanan, Lil' Ed & The Blues Imperials, James Cotton, Kenny Neal, Saffire--The Uppity Blues Women, Jarekus Singleton, Carey Bell and Billy Boy Arnold.

The Alligator catalog contains over 300 albums, ranging from electric Chicago blues and blues rock to acoustic Piedmont blues and West Coast jump blues. By the 1990s, Alligator was established as one of the largest contemporary blues labels in the world. According to Christgau's Record Guide: Rock Albums of the Seventies (1981), Chicago blues saw its best documentation during the 1970s thanks partly to Iglauer and Alligator Records.

Chicago magazine honored Iglauer with the 2001 Chicagoan of the Year award. In addition, Iglauer was a founder of the National Association of Independent Record Distributors (NAIRD, later the Association For Independent Music (AFIM)). He has served on the boards of the Blues Foundation, the Blues Community Foundation (of which he is a founder), and the American Association of Independent Music (A2IM), which replaced AFIM as the main organization of the U.S. independent music industry. In 2014, A2IM presented Iglauer with its Lifetime Achievement Award. Iglauer has also been presented with two "Keeping The Blues Alive" awards from the Blues Foundation, one as an artist manager and one for his producing. He was inducted into the Blues Foundation's Hall of Fame in 1997.

In 2018, Iglauer wrote a book, Bitten by the Blues: The Alligator Records Story, published by the University of Chicago Press. In November 2022, Iglauer was honored by the Recording Industry Association of America at their Washington, D.C. headquarters with a concert by Shemekia Copeland for his work with Alligator Records and Chicago's Blues scene.

== Personal life ==
Iglauer is married to Jo Kolanda and resides in Mequon, Wisconsin. They have a daughter and two grandchildren.

== Books ==
- Bruce Iglauer, Patrick A. Roberts Bitten by the Blues: The Alligator Records Story University of Chicago Press, 2018
