= Kirk Fletcher =

American singer

- Born: December 23, 1975 (age 50); Bellflower, California, United States
- Genres: Electric blues
- Occupations: Guitarist, singer, songwriter
- Instruments: Guitar, singer
- Years active: 1990s–present
- Label: Various
- Website: kirkfletcherband.com

Kirk Fletcher (born December 23, 1975) is an American electric blues guitarist, singer, and songwriter. To date, Fletcher has released six studio albums and one live album. In addition, he has variously been a member of the Fabulous Thunderbirds and the Mannish Boys, plus supplied backing for Joe Bonamassa and Eros Ramazzotti. Fletcher has been nominated for four Blues Music Awards and was a 2015 British Blues Awards nominee.

His album, Hold On, was self-released in October 2018. It reached number 12 in the Living Blues radio chart, and entered at number 15 in the US Billboard Blues Albums chart. It was nominated in 2019 for a Blues Music Award in the 'Contemporary Blues Album' category.

== Biography ==
Kirk Fletcher was born in Bellflower, California, United States. He was the younger son of a Baptist minister, and gained enough confidence from watching his elder sibling, Walter, perform at their father's church, that Kirk learned to play rudimentary guitar by the age of eight. Fletcher was a member of a jazz band during high school, and later played with his friends on road trips in Southern California. In Los Angeles he met Robben Ford's guitar technician, Jeff Rivera, in a small music shop, and was impressed with Ford's expertise on guitar. Later through spending time with Al Blake, who was the lead singer and harmonica player for the Hollywood Fats Band, helped establish connections with other West Coast blues musicians such as Junior Watson and Lynwood Slim.

Fletcher became adept enough on the guitar to perform himself at gigs, and he recorded his debut album I'm Here & I'm Gone (1999) for JSP Records. Blake introduced Fletcher to Kim Wilson of the Fabulous Thunderbirds, which led to Fletcher playing guitar in Kim Wilson's Blues Revue. Touring duties followed and then Fletcher played on Wilson's Grammy Award-nominated live album, Smokin' Joint (2001). Shortly afterwards, Fletcher was invited to collaborate with Charlie Musselwhite. Fletcher stated "This is where I really developed my own sound and Charlie was cool with me being me."

In 2003, Fletcher's second album, Shades of Blue was released by CrossCut Records and then on Delta Groove Productions the following year. Guests on the recording included the singers Kim Wilson, Janiva Magness and Finis Tasby. An opening appeared to join the Fabulous Thunderbirds, and Fletcher played in the band from 2005 until 2008. The opportunities that unfolded led Fletcher into a brief stint with Doyle Bramhall and a few guest appearances playing alongside Cyndi Lauper and Michelle Branch. Fletcher played on the Fabulous Thunderbirds 2005 album, Painted On. In 2006, Fletcher appeared with Nick Curran at the Notodden Blues Festival.

In 2009, a tenth anniversary reissue of I'm Here & I'm Gone came out with bonus tracks. The same year, Fletcher and his band performed at Dark Season Blues in Norway.

My Turn (2010) was Fletcher's third album. It contained tracks penned by Jimmy Reed, Jesse Ed Davis, Jimmy Johnson, Sly Stone, Will Felder, and Travis Carlton. Fletcher also recorded three of his own compositions. With his guitar playing producer Michael Landau, plus the horns of saxophonist Paulie Cerra and trumpeter Paul Litterall, Fletcher tackled Reed's "I Found Love," plus Stone's "Let Me Have It All". The album also contained Kirk's first recorded vocal performance. From that point onward, Fletcher was able to front his own band on tours, and undertake some international tours, both as a member of The Mannish Boys and as lead guitarist for the Italian musician Eros Ramazzotti. In 2014, Fletcher self-released the live collection, Burning Blues (Live at the Baked Potato).

Live at the Greek Theater (2016) was filmed and recorded during Joe Bonamassa's "Three Kings Tour" in 2015, which culminated at the Greek Theatre in Los Angeles. The backing ensemble comprised Fletcher (rhythm guitar), Anton Fig (drums), Michael Rhodes (bass), Reese Wynans (piano, Hammond organ), Lee Thornburg (trumpet, horn arrangements), Paulie Cerra (saxophone), Nick Lane (trombone), and backing singers Mahalia Barnes, Jade MacRae, and Juanita Tippins.

In 2018, Fletcher recorded a video with Josh Smith and Joe Bonamassa, performing the Albert King track "Crosscut Saw".

Fletcher's album, Hold On, was released in October 2018. It reached number 12 in the Living Blues radio chart, and entered at number 15 in the Billboard Blues Albums chart. It was nominated in 2019 for a Blues Music Award in the 'Contemporary Blues Album' category.

== Discography ==
Year	Title	Record label
1999	I'm Here & I'm Gone	JSP Records
2003	Shades of Blue	CrossCut Records / Delta Groove Productions
2010	My Turn	Eclecto Groove Records
2014	Burning Blues (Live at the Baked Potato)	Self-released (live album)
2018	Hold On	Self-released
2020	My Blues Pathway	Cleopatra Records / Cleopatra Blues
2022	Heartache By The Pound	Ogierea Records
2025	Keep On Pushing	VizzTone

== Selected other recordings ==
- 1999: The Henry Gray/Bob Corritore Sessions, Vol. 1: Blues Won't Let Me Take My Rest : Bob Corritore / Henry Gray : Guitar
- 2000: World Wide Wood : Lynwood Slim : Guitar
- 2001: Smokin' Joint : Kim Wilson : Guitar
- 2003: Lonesome Moon Trance : James Harman : Guitar
- 2004: That Represent Man : The Mannish Boys : Guitar
- 2005: Painted On : The Fabulous Thunderbirds : Guitars
- 2006: Last Call : Lynwood Slim : Guitar, Vocals (Background)
- 2007: Big Plans : The Mannish Boys : Guitar
- 2009: Simple Things : Chantelle Barry : Guitar (Electric)
- 2010: Live on the Legendary Rhythm & Blues Cruise : Joe Louis Walker : Guitar, Featured Artist
- 2010: Shake for Me : The Mannish Boys : Composer, Guitar, Guitar (Rhythm)
- 2012: Longtime Friends in the Blues : Bob Corritore / Tail Dragger Jones : Guitar
- 2012: Double Dynamite : The Mannish Boys : Guitar, Guitar (Rhythm)
- 2012: Close to the Bone: Unplugged : Bnois King / Smokin' Joe Kubek : Guitar (Acoustic)
- 2013: Shiver and Sigh : Kara Grainger : Guitar (Rhythm)
- 2014: Wrapped Up and Ready : The Mannish Boys : Composer, Guitar, Guitar (Rhythm), Soloist
- 2015: Bonetime : James Harman : Guitar
- 2015: Muddy Wolf at Red Rocks : Joe Bonamassa : Guitar
- 2016: Live at the Greek Theater : Joe Bonamassa : Guitar (Rhythm)
- 2016: Hard Times, Bad Decisions : Lisa Mann : Featured Artist, Guitar
- 2016: Near Life Experience : Scott Kinsey : Guitar
