= Bob Corritore =

American blues harmonicist, record producer, and blues radio host

- Born: Robert Joseph Corritore; September 27, 1956 (age 70); Chicago, Illinois, United States
- Genre: Electric blues
- Occupations: Harmonicist, songwriter and record producer
- Instrument: Harmonica
- Years active: Late 1970s–present
- Labels: HighTone, Delta Groove, various
- Website: Official website

Bob Corritore (born Robert Joseph Corritore; September 27, 1956) is an American blues harmonica player, record producer, blues radio show host and owner of The Rhythm Room, a music venue in Phoenix, Arizona. Corritore is a recipient of a Blues Music Award, Blues Blast Music Award, Living Blues Award and a Keeping The Blues Alive Award and more. He produced one album that was nominated for a Grammy Award and contributed harmonica on another.

== Early life and education ==
Corritore was born in Chicago, Illinois, United States, but was raised from infancy in suburban Wilmette. At age 12, he began a love affair with the blues after hearing a Muddy Waters song on the radio. Shortly thereafter, he received his first harmonica from his younger brother. He took to it immediately and began teaching himself the instrument by playing along with records and using Tony "Little Son" Glover's book, "Blues Harp" -- the go-to instructional volume of the era -- as a guide. As soon as he was old enough, Corritore began attending blues concerts whenever he could, seeing Sam Lay and Waters perform at his high school and Jim Brewer, Eddie Taylor, Wild Child Butler and Detroit Junior at venues accessible to under-age patrons before venturing to Maxwell Street, the open-air market on Chicago's near South Side, where he caught Big Walter Horton and Big John Wrencher in action.

After graduation from New Trier East High School, Bob attended the University of Tulsa, where he earned a Bachelor of Business Administration degree. He returned to Chicago, where he worked a job by day and pursued his musical education at night. As his skill and confidence improved in his later teens, he started playing in support of Willie Buck and Tail Dragger Jones. His first paying gig came in Buck's band at age 23 alongside Louis and Dave Myers, Johnny "Big Moose" Walker, Odie Payne Jr. and Taylor.

== Career ==
=== Early career ===
Corritore's first live performance came in his teens on Maxwell Street when John Henry Davis invited him to sit in for five or six numbers. He subsequently started attending performances at clubs on the South and West Sides, where he was mentored by Louis Myers, Lester Davenport, Junior Wells, Big Leon Brooks, Little Mack Simmons, Big Walter and others, who regularly invited him on stage to play.

Corritore began a career in music production in 1979. He recorded harmonica player Little Willie Anderson, creating his own label, Blues On Blues Records, in the process. Released as Swinging The Blues and produced with the assistance of future Grammy winner Dick Shurman and Delmark Records owner Bob Koester, the LP debuted the same year and was reissued 13 years later in CD format on Earwig Music. A second release, Big Leon Brooks' Lets Go To Town, followed in 1982.

=== Phoenix years ===
In 1981, Corritore relocated to Phoenix, Arizona, where he was joined a few months later by Louisiana Red. The pair worked together in duo and full-band formats and lived together for a short period of time before Red relocated to Germany. Corritore subsequently joined a succession of bands fronted by regional favorites Big Pete Pearson, Janiva Magness, Tommy Dukes and Buddy Reed. Years later they worked together again when Corritore produced Louisiana Red's Sittin' Here Wonderin' (1995) (Earwig Music). Since 1984, Corritore has been hosting "Those Lowdown Blues," a five-hour Sunday night on KJZZ (FM).

Two years later, Corritore recruited former Howlin’ Wolf drummer Chico Chism to relocate from Chicago to Phoenix for various band and studio projects, a relationship that endured until Chism's death in 2007. Corritore opened The Rhythm Room music venue in Phoenix in 1991. It has served as his home base ever since. He and hIs house band, the Rhythm Room All-Stars, have backed dozens of high-profile blues musicians, both at the club and in recording sessions, a roster that includes Bo Diddley, Pinetop Perkins, Ike Turner, Nappy Brown, Eddy Clearwater and many others.

His first release as a front man, All-Star Blues Sessions, came in 1999 on the HighTone label with Corritore playing in support of 16 blues artists, including Diddley, Chism, Robert Lockwood Jr., Henry Gray and other talents. That release established Corritore as both a harmonica player and producer in the blues community in a career that has included several subsequent releases under his own name, often sharing billing with other traditional blues artists, including John Primer, Gray, Kid Ramos and Dave Riley.

As a harmonica player, he has guested on albums by R.L. Burnside, Pinetop Perkins, Dave Mason, Zac Harmon, Louisiana Red, Nappy Brown, Diunna Greenleaf, Bob Margolin, Bill Howl-N-Madd Perry, Dave Specter, Smokin’ Joe Kubek, Mannish Boys, Kilborn Alley Blues Band, Tomcat Courtney, Big Pete Pearson, Sam Lay, Mud Morganfield, Johnny Tucker, Willie “Big Eyes” Smith, Ben Levin, Tom Walbank, Deb Ryder, Adrianna Marie, Sugaray Rayford, Tony Holiday, The Freemonts and several others. And he has served as producer for releases by R.L. Burnside, Mojo Buford, Kim Wilson, William Clarke, Chism and compilations released by several labels. The Wilson album -- Smokin' Joint, released on M.C. Records in 2001 -- was a finalist in the best traditional blues category at the 44th Annual Grammy Awards. He has released albums on the HighTone, Blue Witch, Delta Groove and SWMAF labels, as well as his current home, VizzTone.

Corritore has appeared at major blues events around the world including Chicago Blues Festival, Lucerne Blues Festival and Bellinzona Blues Sessions (Switzerland), Edmonton Blues Festival and Calgary Blues Festival (Canada), King Biscuit Blues Festival and Big Blues Bender (U.S.), Bossa Y Jazz and Pocas de Blues (Brazil), Cognac Blues Festival and Bay-Car Blues Festival (France), Marco Fiume Blues Passions Festival (Italy), Moulin Blues Ospel (Holland), Blues At The Savoy (Finland), Hondarribia Blues Festival (Spain), Lahnsteiner Blues Festival (Germany), Boquette Blues Festival (Panama) and more. He has also performed at the Kennedy Center, The Strathmore, The Dodge Theater, AVA Amphitheater and other prestigious venues.

An official endorser of Hohner harmonicas, Corritore regularly leads harmonics master classes at the Blues Foundation's annual International Blues Challenge week in Memphis. The editor and main writer of the Bob Corritore Blues Newsletter, his 2020 album, The Gypsy Woman Told Me, a partnership with John Primer, was a finalist for traditional blues album of the year in the Blues Blast Music Awards after winning the same honor for Don't Let The Devil Ride in 2019.

== Awards and honors ==
- 1999: Inducted into the Arizona Blues Hall of Fame.
- 2001: Kim Wilson's Smokin' Joint album, which Corritore produced, was a Grammy finalist in the traditional blues category
- 2007: Phil Gordon, the mayor of Phoenix, proclaimed September 29 as "Bob Corritore Day."
- 2007: Corritore appeared on Pinetop Perkins' On The 88s: Live in Chicago, a finalist in the traditional blues category at the 50th Annual Grammy Awards
- 2007: Honored by the Blues Foundation with a Keeping the Blues Alive Award for his radio work
- 2007: Blues Music Award nominee along with Dave Riley in the acoustic blues category for their CD, Travelin' The Dirt Road
- 2011, 2013 and 2019: Blues Music Award nominee for harmonica player of the year
- 2012: Living Blues magazine Readers Poll honoree as harmonica player of the year
- 2014: Blues411 Jimi Award winner for harmonica player of the year
- 2016: Blues Music Award nominee along with Henry Gray in the historical album category for their CD, Blues Won't Let Me Take My Rest Vol.1
- 2017: Blues Music Award nominee along with Big Jon Atkinson in the traditional album category for their CD, House Party At Big Jon's
- 2019: Blues Blast Music Award winner in the traditional album category for Don't Let The Devil Ride
- 2020: Blues Blast Music Award nominee along with John Primer in the traditional album category for their CD, The Gypsy Woman Told Me
- 2021: Living Blues magazine Critics Poll winner in best blues albums of 2020 category along with John Primer for The Gypsy Woman Told Me
- 2021: Blues Blast Music Award nominee in the traditional album category for Bob Corritore & Friends: Spider in My Stew
- 2021: The Blues Lounge Radio Show Harmonica Player of the Year (UK)
- 2021: Blues Blast Music Award nominee in the historical or vintage category along with Henry Gray for Cold Chills and with Kid Ramos for Phoenix Blues Sessions
- 2021: Inducted into the Arizona Music & Entertainment Hall of Fame
- 2022: Blues Music Award nominee for harmonica player of the year
- 2022: Blues Music Award nominee in the traditional blues album category for Spider in My Stew
- 2022: Blues Blast Music Award nominee in the traditional blues album category along with Louisiana Red for Tell Me 'Bout It
- 2022: Blues Blast Music Award winner in the historical or vintage category for Down Home Blues Revue
- 2022: The Blues Lounge Radio Show Harmonica Player of the Year (UK)
- 2023: Blues Music Award nominee in the traditional album category for Bob Corritore & Friends' You Shocked Me
- 2023: Blues Music Award nominee for harmonica player of the year
- 2023: Living Blues Award nominee for male blues artist of the year
- 2023: Living Blues Award nominee for most outstanding musician (harmonica)
- 2023: Blues Blast Music Award winner in the historical or vintage category for Bob Corritore & Friends' Women in Blues Showcase
- 2023: The Blues Lounge Radio Show Harmonica Player of the Year (UK)
- 2024: The Blues Lounge Radio Show Harmonica Player of the Year (UK)

== Discography ==
=== Albums ===
Album title	Record label	Accreditation	Year of release
All-Star Blues Sessions	HMG/HighTone Records	Bob Corritore	1999
Travelin' the Dirt Road	Blue Witch Records	Dave Riley & Bob Corritore	2007
Lucky to Be Living	Blue Witch Records	Dave Riley & Bob Corritore	2009
Harmonica Blues	Delta Groove	Bob Corritore & Friends	2010
The Kid Ramos/Bob Corritore Phoenix Blues Sessions	SWMAF [South West Musical Arts Foundation] Records	Kid Ramos & Bob Corritore	2012
Longtime Friends in the Blues	Delta Groove	Tail Dragger & Bob Corritore	2012
Knockin' Around These Blues	Delta Groove	John Primer & Bob Corritore	2013
Hush Your Fuss!	SWMAF Records	Dave Riley & Bob Corritore	2013
Taboo: Blues Harmonica Instrumentals	Delta Groove	Bob Corritore	2014
The Henry Gray/Bob Corritore Sessions, Vol. 1: Blues Won't Let Me Take My Rest	Delta Groove	Henry Gray & Bob Corritore	2015
House Party At Big Jon's	Delta Groove	Big Jon Atkinson & Bob Corritore	2016
Ain't Nothing You Can Do!	Delta Groove	John Primer & Bob Corritore	2017
Don't Let The Devil Ride!	SWMAF Records/VizzTone	Bob Corritore & Friends	2018
Do The Hip-Shake Baby!	SWMAF Records/VizzTone	Bob Corritore & Friends	2019
The Gypsy Woman Told Me	SWMAF Records/VizzTone	John Primer & Bob Corritore	2020
Travelin' The Dirt Road (deluxe reissue)	SWMAF Records/VizzTone	Dave Riley & Bob Corritore	2020
The Kid Ramos/Bob Corritore Phoenix Blues Sessions (deluxe reissue)	SWMAF Records/VizzTone	Kid Ramos & Bob Corritore	2020
The Henry Gray/Bob Corritore Sessions, Vol. 2: Cold Chills	SWMAF Records/VizzTone	Henry Gray & Bob Corritore	2020
Spider in My Stew	SWMAF Records/VizzTone	Bob Corritore & Friends	2021
Tell Me 'Bout It	SWMAF Records/VizzTone	Louisiana Red & Bob Corritore	2022
Down Home Blues Revue	SWMAF Records/VizzTone	Bob Corritore & Friends	2022
So Far	VizzTone	Bob Margolin & Bob Corritore	2022
You Shocked Me	SWMAF Records/VizzTone	Bob Corritore & Friends	2022
The World in a Jug	SWMAF Records/VizzTone	Jimi "Primetime" Smith & Bob Corritore	2023
Women in Blues Showcase	SWMAF Records/VizzTone	Bob Corritore & Friends	2023
High Rise Blues	SWMAF Records/VizzTone	Bob Corritore & Friends	2023
Phoenix Blues Rumble	SWMAF Records/VizzTone	Bob Corritore & Friends	2023
Crawlin' Kingsnake	SWMAF Records/VizzTone	John Primer & Bob Corritore	2024

=== Guest ===
Album title	Record label	Accreditation	Year of release
For Our Children	Radioactive	Various Artists	1978
Ominous Clouds	Last Flash	Various Artists	1982
Blue Saguaro	Fervor	Various Artists	1993
Raw As Hell	Cher-Kee	Chico Chism	1995
Yoakum Texas Blues	PAU	Lucius Parr	1996
Desert Blues Volume 1	CDGB	Various Artists	1996
Vietnam Blues	Tempest	Sarge Lintecum	1997
What Kind of Woman Is That!	Blue Loon	Texas Red	1997
Gimme Some a Yo' Sugar!	Owl's Nest	Lisa Otey	1999
We Got a Problem	PAU	Lucius Parr	1999
Plays Chicago Blues	HighTone	Henry Gray	2001
One More Drink	Blue Witch	Big Pete Pearson	2001
Rhythm Room Blues	HighTone	Various Artists	2001
Blues Vredenburg Utrect Estafette	Sampson	Various Artists	2001
Blues Greats	The Blues Foundation	Various Artists	2002
American Blues	Putumayo	Various Artists	2003
No Monkeys on This Train	HighTone	R. L. Burnside	2003
Snakes Crawl at Night	Random Chance	Chief Schabuttie Gilliame	2004
No Turn on Red	HighTone	Louisiana Red	2005
Born in the Honey: The Pinetop Perkins Story	Sagebrush Productions	Various Artists	2006
Way Back	HighTone	Willie "Big Eyes" Smith	2006
The HighTone Records Story	HighTone	Various Artists	2006
On the 88s: Live in Chicago	Kingston	Pinetop Perkins	2007
I'm Here Baby	Blue Witch	Big Pete Pearson with The Rhythm Room All Stars	2007
House Rockin' and Blues Shoutin'! Celebrating 15 Years of The Rhythm Room	Blue Witch	Various Artists	2007
Lucerne Blues Festival 2007	LBF	Various Artists	2007
Long Time Coming	Blind Pig	Nappy Brown	2007
Stop and Think About It	Earwig Music	Chris James and Patrick Rynn	2008
Downsville Blues	Blue Witch	Tomcat Courtney	2008
Back to the Black Bayou	Bluestone	Louisiana Red & Little Victor's Juke Joint	2008
2008 Blues Music Awards	Blues Music Awards	Various Artists	2009
Live in Lahnstein 2008	Collectors Only	Big Pete Pearson & The Rhythm Room All Stars	2009
Feelin' Good	Blind Pig	Jimmy Rogers	2009
Finger in Your Eye	Southwest Musical Arts Foundation	Big Pete Pearson	2009
Best of 'The Legendary' Sam Lay	SL Records	Sam Lay	2010
30th Blues Music Awards	Blues Music Awards	Various Artists	2010
Gonna Boogie Anyway	Earwig Music	Chris James and Patrick Rynn	2010
Blues for the Gulf.org	VizzTone	Various Artists	2010
2010 Blues Music Awards	Blues Music Awards	Various Artists	2011
Boogie All Night	El Toro	Little Victor	2011
Memphis Mojo	Ruf	Louisiana Red & Little Victor's Juke Joint	2011
Trying to Hold On	Blue Mercy	Diunna Greenleaf	2011
Lucerne Blues Festival 2011	Lucerne Blues Festiva	Various Artists	2011
Gotta Go	PAU	Lucius Parr	2012
Montauk Rocks	Oscail Films	Various Artists	2012
Son of the Seventh Son	Severn	Mud Morganfield	2012
Blues for Children 2012	Hondarribia Blues Society	Various Artists	2012
Close to the Bone	Delta Groove	Smokin' Joe Kubek & Bnois King	2012
Double Dynamite	Delta Groove	The Mannish Boys	2012
The Walter Davis Project	Electro-Fi	Various Artists	2013
Trickbag With Friends, Vol. 1	Magic Production	Trickbag	2013
Rooster	Indys Records	Clay Swafford	2013
Sittin' Right Down and Moan	Harsh Records	Harsh Guitar Mark	2013
34th Blues Music Awards	Blues Music Awards	Various Artists	2014
Future's Past	Something-Music	Dave Mason	2014
Message in Blue	Delmark	Dave Specter	2014
Wrapped Up and Ready	Delta Groove	The Mannish Boys	2014
Soul Bag - La Sélection Blues & Soul	Soul Bag Magazine	Various Artists	2014
Lucerne Blues Festival 2014	Lucerne Blues Festival	Various Artists	2014
Blues Magazine - The Best of 2014	The Blues Magazine	Various Artists	2014
Southside	Nimoy Sue Records	Sugaray Rayford	2015
Back Down South	Bluebeat Music	Big Jon Atkinson	2015
The Power of My Shoes	Eureka Live	Kathy Boye	2015
Blues For Big Walter	Eller Soul Records	Various Artists	2016
Hondarribia Blues Festival 2016	Hondarribia Blues Society	Various Artists	2016
Alligator	Truax Records	The Fremonts	2016
36th Blues Music Awards	The Blues Foundation	Various Artists	2016
Grit, Grease & Tears	Bejeb Music	Deb Ryder	2016
Soul Bag - La Sélection Blues & Soul	Soul Bag Magazine	Various Artists	2016
Kingdom Of Swing	VizzTone	Adrianna Marie & Her Roomful Of All Stars	2017
The Tolono Tapes	Run It Back	Kilborn Alley Blues Band	2017
37th Blues Music Awards	The Blues Foundation	Various Artists	2017
92	MusicMatters	Henry Gray & The Creole Cats	2017
Seven Day Blues	Highjohn	Johnny Tucker	2018
38th Blues Music Awards	The Blues Foundation	Various Artists	2018
Soul Bag - La Sélection Blues & Soul: CD Sampler 037	Soul Bag Magazine	Various Artists	2018
Porch Sessions	VizzTone	Tony Holiday	2019
Mississippi BarBQ	Catfood	Zac Harmon	2019
Before Me	VizzTone	Ben Levin	2019
Bliss	Self-produced	Carol Pacey & The Honey Shakers	2019
Thankful For The Blues	Bill Perry Music	Bill "Howl-N-Madd" Perry	2019
This Guitar And Tonight	VizzTone	Bob Margolin	2019
The Rhythm Room	Bar-Bare Records	Willie Buck	2020
Knee Deep Into These Blues	–	Bluesman Mike & The Blues Review Band	2020
Tom Walbank Presents 'Hootmatic Blues'	–	Various Artists	2020

=== Producer ===
Album title	Record label	Accreditation	Year of release
Swinging The Blues	Earwig Music	Little Willie Anderson	1979
Let's Go To Town	Earwig Music	Big Leon Brooks	1982
Low Blows - An Anthology of Chicago Harmonica Blues	Rooster Blues	Various Artists	1994
Earwig Music Company 16th Anniversary Sampler	Earwig Music	Various Artists	1995
Sittin' Here Wonderin'	Earwig Music	Louisiana Red	1995
Essential Harmonica Blues	River North Records	Various Artists	1997
Not The Same Old Blues Crap	Fat Possum	Various Artists	1997
Come On In	Fat Possum	R.L. Burnside	1998
Earwig Music Company 20th Anniversary Collection	Earwig Music	Various Artists	1999
Champagne & Reefer	Fedora/HighNote	Mojo Buford	1999
Smokin' Joint	M.C. Records	Kim Wilson	2001
Not The Same Old Blues Crap, Vol. II	Fat Possum	Various Artists	2001
Blues On My Radio	Southwest Musical Arts Foundation	Various Artists	2004
The Legend Live	M.C. Records	Robert Lockwood Jr.	2004
Blood Harmony: A Cappella	Southwest Musical Arts Foundation	The Reed Family Album	2005
Chico Chism's West Side Chicago Blues Party	Southwest Musical Arts Foundation	Chico Chism	2006
Time Brings About A Change... A Floyd Dixon Celebration	High John Records	Various Artists	2006
Broadcasting The Blues	Southwest Musical Arts Foundation	Various Artists	2009
Flyin' High - A Collection of Phoenix Blues, Rhythm, and Spirit from the 1950s and 60s	Southwest Musical Arts Foundation	Various Artists	2010
Bet On The Blues	Blues Fidelity	Paul Oscher	2010
Heavy Hittin' West Coast Harp	Bear Family Records	William Clarke	2019

== See also ==
- List of electric blues musicians
- List of harmonica blues musicians
