= R.J. Mischo =

- Born: Robert Joseph Mischo; March 18, 1960 (age 66); Chilton, Wisconsin, United States
- Genres: Electric blues
- Occupations: Harmonicist, singer, songwriter, record producer
- Instruments: Harmonica, vocals
- Years active: Late 1970s–present
- Labels: Various including Delta Groove Productions and CrossCut Records
- Website: Official website

R.J. Mischo (born March 18, 1960) is an American electric blues harmonicist, singer, songwriter, and record producer. To date he has released twelve albums on a number of labels, and his music has been aired on independent film scores, television commercials, and documentaries on the Discovery Channel. Mischo has contributed to a couple of Mel Bay harmonica instruction books. In addition, he was listed in that author's The Encyclopedia of Harmonica.

Mischo's own compositions, "King of a Mighty Good Time" and "Two Hours From Tulsa", were both number one on the playlist at Sirius XM Radio. His album releases, Knowledge You Can't Get in College and Make It Good, made the Top 50 in Living Blues albums of the year listings.

== Life and career ==
Robert Joseph Mischo was born in Chilton, Wisconsin, United States. He was the youngest of four brothers, all of whom were proficient in a musical instrument. Mischo himself began playing the harmonica aged nine and ten years later was working as a professional musician. His passion for the blues was further ignited after attending a Muddy Waters concert. He began playing in and around Minneapolis, Minnesota in the late 1970s, and was soon in contact with a number of other blues musicians from that area. These included Percy Strother, Milwaukee Slim, Sonny Rogers, George "Mojo" Buford, and Lazy Bill Lucas. Around the same time, he befriended Lynwood Slim, who gave the younger Mischo tips and guidance on playing the harmonica. His other friendship with Mojo Buford lasted the latter's lifetime.

After playing solo for a while, Mischo formed Blues Deluxe, which the Star Tribune commented was "Minnesota's hardest working blues band". He later formed R.J. Mischo & the Teddy Morgan Blues Band, which released Ready to Go in 1992 on Blue Loon Records. The album got a good response and Mischo was nominated for several local awards. In 1994, he and his band toured across Europe and appeared at the Notodden Blues Festival. In December 1995, Mischo's album, Gonna Rock Tonight, was released on Blue Loon Records. The album's cover stated it featured Teddy "Kid" Morgan, Bruce McCabe, Billy Black and Rob Stupka, ostensibly his renamed 'Red Hot Blues Band'. The album contained his cover versions of Snooky Pryor's, "Judgment Day" and Sonny Boy Williamson II's "Bye Bye Bird". AllMusic noted "R.J. Mischo resurrects the glory days of '50s Chicago harp-playing..." The following year, Rough N Tough was released by CrossCut Records, the first of five albums of his that were issued by that German independent record label.

In 1996, Mischo relocated to San Francisco, California, where he established his reputation by appearing at venues and festivals across the United States, and in Europe. In San Francisco he recorded West Wind Blowin' (1999), which included guest appearances by Steve Freund and Rusty Zinn on guitar and vocals. In 1997, Cool Disposition, was issued by CrossCut Records, and in June 2000, Mischo played at the second annual Apple River Blues Festival in River's Edge Park, Somerset, Wisconsin. His move to California also led to him meeting fellow harmonica players such as Rod Piazza, Kim Wilson, Mark Hummel and Andy Just. Albums including Meet Me on the Coast (2002), He Came to Play (2006), King of a Mighty Good Time (2008) and Knowledge You Can't Get in College (2010) all followed. Mischo continued to develop his own style, normally using the resources of pick-up bands while on tour and session musicians in the recording studio. His 2014 album, Everything I Need, had Jeremy Johnson and Frank Krakowski on guitar, Bruce McCabe (piano) and a rhythm section of Billy Black and Victor Span. Make It Good, was issued on Delta Groove Productions two years before, although Mischo enjoyed the extra freedom of self-releasing most of his more recent output. Make It Good featured Johnny Moeller and Nick Curran among the guest performers.

Mischo has also assisted as an instructor at several of Jon Gindick's Harmonica Jam Camps in Clarksdale, Mississippi. Mischo is endorsed by Hohner harmonicas.

He currently resides in Southern California.

== Discography ==
=== Albums ===
| Year | Title | Record label | Credited to |
|---|---|---|---|
| 1992 | Ready to Go! | Blue Loon Records | R.J. Mischo & the Teddy Morgan Blues Band |
| 1994 | Gonna Rock Tonight | Blue Loon Records | R.J. Mischo and His Red Hot Blues Band |
| 1996 | Rough N Tough | CrossCut Records | R.J. Mischo and His Red Hot Blues Band |
| 1997 | Cool Disposition | CrossCut Records | R.J. Mischo and His Red Hot Blues Band |
| 1999 | West Wind Blowin' (Mountain Top Productions, Vol. 3) | Mountain Top Productions / CrossCut Records | R.J. Mischo featuring Steve Freund and Rusty Zinn |
| 2002 | Meet Me on the Coast | CrossCut Records | R.J. Mischo |
| 2004 | Down Home Super Trio: In the House [live] | CrossCut Records | R.J. Mischo, Richard innes, Frank Goldwasser |
| 2006 | He Came to Play | CrossCut Records | R.J. Mischo |
| 2008 | King of a Mighty Good Time | Challis/CD Baby | R.J. Mischo |
| 2010 | Knowledge You Can't Get in College | Greaseland Records | R.J. Mischo |
| 2012 | Make It Good | Delta Groove Productions | R.J. Mischo |
| 2014 | Everything I Need | rjblues/CD Baby | R.J. Mischo |
| 2018 | I Hope You're Satisfied | Bluebeat Music | R.J. Mischo |

== See also ==
- List of electric blues musicians
