= Deb Ryder =

- Born: Peoria, Illinois, United States
- Genres: Blues
- Occupations: Singer, songwriter
- Years active: 1980s–present
- Labels: Bejeb Music, VizzTone Records
- Website: Official website

Deb Ryder is an American blues singer and songwriter. She has released five albums since 2013, although her involvement in music spans decades in various capacities.

== Life and career ==
She was born in Peoria, Illinois, United States. Early in her life, her family relocated to Chicago, where her father, Allan R. Swanson, became a local nightclub crooner. The family moved again to Ohio, and onwards to Malibu, California. Ryder's parents then divorced and her single mother of five, Maryanne Swanson, relocated the remaining family in 1968 to Topanga, California. Among their neighbors was Canned Heat's Bob Hite, whose massive collection of blues gramophone records was a magnet and inspiration to the adolescent Ryder.

Her mother remarried a local contractor, and they jointly opened Topanga Corral, which hosted an array of musicians including Canned Heat, Spirit, Neil Young, Buffalo Springfield, and the Eagles. Effectively living next door to the club, meant Ryder got to liaise with visiting musicians, including Big Joe Turner, Etta James and Taj Mahal, who all acted as mentors. Encouraged and with easy access to the premises, while in her teenage years, Ryder and her small band regularly opened the show at Topanga Corral for Charlie Musselwhite, Big Joe Turner, Etta James, and Taj Mahal.

Ryder went on to study at the University of California, Los Angeles. Her musical background proved invaluable as she then worked as a session musician, who performed on television advertisements, as well as providing backup vocals on a number of other musician's recordings. Her voice was used in the lead role for the Las Vegas-based musical show, Splash. Settling back down to her blues roots led to her meeting her husband, and bass guitarist, Ric Ryder. He encouraged her to write blues material and together they formed an ensemble, the Bluesryders, who performed in local clubs and at music festivals for over two decades.

In 2013, she returned to a series of songs written over the years, and then re-worked upon with her husband, and recorded her debut album, Might Just Get Lucky. She later met up with the record producer Tony Braunagel, who oversaw her next release, Let It Rain (2015). The musicians on the recording included Braunagel who played the percussion and James Hutchinson on double bass, plus Kirk Fletcher and Johnny Lee Schell on guitar while Mike Finnigan played keyboards. Ryder wrote all of the 11 tracks. Grit Grease & Tears followed in 2016, with Braunagel producing and Bob Corritore played harmonica as a guest musician on the album with Sugaray Rayford supplying some additional vocals.

By 2018, Ryder had signed a recording contract with VizzTone Records, who released her fourth album, Enjoy the Ride on June 11 that year. It was also produced by Braunagel, who played drums with Coco Montoya supplying lead guitar alongside Schell on rhythm. Enjoy the Ride appeared on Living Blues magazine's annual list of top 50 albums. Recording work for her next album was affected by the COVID-19 pandemic in the United States, which necessitated the use of three separate recording studios and digitalized exchanges of ideas. All 13 sides on Memphis Moonlight (2021) were written by Ryder, who again used Braunagel to oversee a cast of musicians, including Schell (guitar, bass and keyboards), Finnigan (keyboards), plus guest appearances from the guitarists Ronnie Earl, Joey Delgado and Alastair Greene, and Steve Berlin (saxophone) along with David Hidalgo (accordion and backup vocals).

== Discography ==
=== Albums ===
Year	Title	Record label
2013	Might Just Get Lucky	Bejeb Music
2015	Let It Rain	Bejeb Music
2016	Grit Grease & Tears	Bejeb Music
2018	Enjoy the Ride	VizzTone Records
2021	Memphis Moonlight	VizzTone Records
