= Have Blues Will Travel =

Have Blues Will Travel may refer to:

- Have Blues Will Travel, a 1958 country song by Eddie Noack
- Have Blues – Will Travel, a 1980 album by the Wolf Gang led by Eddie Shaw
- Have Blues, Will Travel, a 2010 album by Bnois King and Smokin' Joe Kubek
