= Blues Blast Magazine =

Online music magazine, founded in 2007

- Categories: Music, Blues
- Frequency: Weekly
- Format: Digital
- Circulation: 44,000
- Publisher: Bob Kieser
- Founded: 2007
- First issue: 2007
- Country: United States
- Based in: Creve Coeur, Illinois
- Language: English
- Website: http://www.bluesblastmagazine.com

Blues Blast Magazine is a weekly online magazine dedicated to the Blues genre. The magazine provides artist interviews, album reviews, and news. It is the presenter of the annual Blues Blast Music Awards. In 2025, Blues Blast Magazine was honored by The Blues Foundation with a Keeping the Blues Alive Award for its contributions to the genre.

== History ==
In 2007, publisher and editor Bob Kieser launched Illinois Blues Blast. The publication began with an email list of approximately 1,000 subscribers. The initial focus was on album reviews and performance schedules for artists in Illinois and the surrounding Midwest. In 2008, the publication was rebranded as Blues Blast Magazine. The shift coincided with the establishment of the annual Blues Blast Music Awards. In 2013, the publication was inducted into the Chicago Blues Hall of Fame.

The magazine is a digital publication distributed weekly. Its editorial content focuses on the contemporary Blues scene and its history. The magazine operates with a staff of over 20 writers and photographers, and has published over 900 consecutive weekly issues, which includes over 5,500 music reviews and 670 artist interviews. The publications is the largest publicly available online repository of Blues information.

== Blues Blast Music Awards ==
The Blues Blast Music Awards are an annual set of awards presented by the magazine since 2008. Although the Awards are noted for being the largest fan-voted awards in the Blues genre, its nominees are determined solely by a group of Blues music industry professionals, including music critics, journalists, festival promoters, music venue managers, producers, and musicians.

According to the magazine, the Awards results in two forms of recognition for artists. First, since award nominees represent the "best of" choices from Blues critics, an artist is recognized as having earned the equivalent of a "critics' award" honor by being nominated. Second, because the award winners are determined by the votes of Blues fans, an artist is recognized as having won the equivalent of a "people's choice award" honor in the category they were nominated.

The Awards are hosted at a live ceremony featuring performances from the nominated artists. For its first several years, the ceremony was held at Buddy Guy's Legends in Chicago. In 2023, the 16th annual awards were held for the first time in Peoria, Illinois, at the 3300 Event Center, and served as a fundraising benefit for the Sean Costello Memorial Fund for Bipolar Research. The Awards has also presented the Sean Costello Rising Star Award, which was named in honor of blues musician Sean Costello.

The Awards recognize artists across a wide spectrum of blues sub-genres. In 2024, Rick Estrin & The Nightcats won Contemporary Blues Album for The Hits Keep Coming, in a category that also included nominees Selwyn Birchwood and Anthony Geraci. The award for Traditional Blues Album went to John Primer & Bob Corritore for Crawlin' Kingsnake, with other nominees including Nick Moss and Monster Mike Welch. Christone "Kingfish" Ingram was named Male Blues Artist, and Sue Foley was named Female Blues Artist. Other nominees have include Shemekia Copeland, Bobby Rush, Bai Kamara and Elvin Bishop.

The Awards recognize achievement in the following categories:

Album:

- Contemporary Blues Album
- Traditional Blues Album
- Soul Blues Album
- Rock Blues Album
- Acoustic Blues Album
- Live Blues Album
- Historical or Vintage Recording
- New Artist Debut Album

Artist:

- Blues Band of the Year
- Male Blues Artist
- Female Blues Artist
- Sean Costello Rising Star Award
- Producer of the Year

Performance:

- Electric Guitar Player of the Year
- Acoustic Guitar Player of the Year
- Slide Guitar Player of the Year
- Bass Guitar Player of the Year
- Keyboard Player of the Year
- Drummer of the Year
- Harmonica Player of the Year
- Horn Player of the Year
- Vocalist of the Year

Video:

- Blues Music Video of the Year

=== 2025 Blues Blast Music Awards ===
On September 20, 2025, Blues Blast announced the following winners of the 2025 Blues Blast Music Awards:

Contemporary Blues Album	Traditional Blues Album
Tommy Castro & The Painkillers – Closer To The Bone: Andrew Duncanson – California Trap (feat. Michael Peloquin); Chris Cain – Good Intentions Gone Bad; Ronnie Baker Brooks – Blues In My DNA; Kid Ramos feat. Brian Templeton and Johnny Ramos – Strange Things Happening; Tony Holiday – Keep Your Head Up	Bobby Rush & Kenny Wayne Shepherd – Young Fashioned Ways: Eden Brent – Getaway Blues; John Primer – Grown in Mississippi; Bob Corritore & Friends – Doin' The Shout; Frank Catalano and Lurrie Bell – Set Me Free; Bob Stroger & The Headcutters – Bob Is Back
Soul Blues Album	Rock Blues Album
Curtis Salgado – Fine By Me: Billy Price – Person Of Interest; Tad Robinson – Soul In Blue; Sugaray Rayford – Human Decency; The Anthony Paule Soul Orchestra – What Are You Waiting For?; Johnny Rawls – Make Them Dance	Tab Benoit – I Hear Thunder: Albert Castiglia – Righteous Souls; Ian Siegal Meets Johnny Mastro – Easy Tiger; Mike Farris – The Sound of Muscle Shoals; Brody Buster – Redemption; Matt "The Rattlesnake" Lesch – Blues Cut Like Glass
Acoustic Blues Album	Live Blues Album
Giles Robson & John Primer – Ten Chicago Blues Classics: Johnny Iguana – At Delmark; Prakash Slim – 8000 Miles To The Crossroads; Eva Rose & David Pippin – Black Water Blues; Catfish Keith – Shake Me Up; Guy Davis – The Legend of Sugarbelly; Lee Kanehira – The Chicago Blues Piano Trio!!	Willie Buck – Live at Buddy Guy's Legends: The Blues Giants – Live at Groove Now; Eric Johanson – Live In Mississippi; Tas Cru – Tas Cru Band LIVE; Sean Chambers – Live From Daryl's House Club; Bruce Katz Band – Back In Boston Live
Historical or Vintage Recording	New Artist Debut Album
Duke Robillard – Roll With Me: Frank Bey – Peace; Jim Brewer and Dan Smith – Take It Easy Greasy; Terry Blade – Chicago Kinfolk: The Juke Joint Blues; Bernard Allison – Chills & Thrills	Christopher Wyze & the Tellers – Stuck in the Mud: Jad Tariq – Jad Tariq Sings; Jovin Webb – Drifter; Jubu Smith – JUBU; Fran Drew and the Lucky Strikes – Trial by Fire; Jantso Jokelin – Spark of Luck
Blues Band Of The Year	Male Blues Artist
Tab Benoit Band: Southern Avenue; The Anthony Paule Soul Orchestra; Tommy Castro & The Painkillers; The Blood Brothers	Tab Benoit: John Primer; Andrew Duncanson; Chris Cain; D.K. Harrell; Curtis Salgado
Female Blues Artist	Sean Costello Rising Star Award
Shemekia Copeland: Carolyn Wonderland; Eden Brent; Tierinii Jackson; Ruthie Foster; Sue Foley	Matt "The Rattlesnake" Lesch: Tony Holiday; Jad Tariq; Stephen Hull; Jovin Webb; Harrell "Young Rell" Davenport
Producer Of The Year	Electric Guitarist Of The Year
Mike Zito: Tom Hambridge; Kid Andersen; Jim Gaines; Bob Corritore; Tony Braunagel	Tab Benoit: Duke Robillard; Chris Cain; Kid Andersen; Laura Chavez; Kid Ramos
Acoustic Guitarist Of The Year	Slide Guitarist Of The Year
Keb' Mo': Catfish Keith; Kevin Burt; Guy Davis; Doug MacLeod	Derek Trucks: Robert Randolph; Sonny Landreth; Sean Chambers; John Primer; Joanna Connor
Bass Guitarist Of The Year	Keyboard Player Of The Year
Danielle Nicole: Bob Stroger; Rodrigo Mantovani; Benny Turner; Scot Sutherland; Jerry Jemmott	Kenny "Blues Boss" Wayne: Jim Pugh; Johnny Iguana; Bruce Katz; Ben Levin; Eden Brent
Percussionist Of The Year	Harmonica Player Of The Year
Kenny "Beedy Eyes" Smith: Derrick D'mar Martin; Tony Braunagel; June Core; Terrence Higgins; Tom Hambridge	Charlie Musselwhite: Rick Estrin; Jason Ricci; Kim Wilson; Bob Corritore; Dennis Gruenling; Kim Wilson
Horn Player Of The Year	Vocalist Of The Year
Vanessa Collier: Terry Hanck; Doug Woolverton; Jimmy Carpenter; Sax Gordon Beadle; Deanna Bogart	Bobby Rush: Curtis Salgado; Oscar Wilson; Andrew Duncanson; Tad Robinson; Billy Price
Blues Video Of The Year
Bobby Rush & Kenny Wayne Shepherd – "Uncle Esau": Tomislav Goluban with Crooked Eye Tommy – "There Is A Train"; Peacock & the Surfarians – "Dead Mans Blues"; Kid Ramos – "Strange Things Happening"; Billy Price – "Inside That Box"

== Recognition ==
In 2025, the Blues Foundation honored Blues Blast Magazine with a Keeping the Blues Alive Award. The award is presented to non-performing individuals and organizations for "significant contributions to the Blues world" and are determined by a panel of blues professionals based on merit. The official citation recognized the magazine as a "dedicated voice for the blues community" and an "indispensable resource for blues fans".

== See also ==
- The Blues Foundation
- Blues Music Award
- Living Blues
- Cadence
