= Delta Groove Productions =

- Founded: 2004
- Founder: Randy Chortkoff
- Genre: Blues
- Country of origin: United States
- Location: Van Nuys, California
- Official website: deltagrooveproductions.com

Delta Groove Productions is an American blues record label in Van Nuys, California, United States. The label was founded by Randy Chortkoff (né Rand Jay Chortkoff; 1949–2015), a producer, concert promoter, and harmonica player.

== Overview and history ==
The label started with blues by musicians from Los Angeles. Its first release was That Represent Man (2004), the debut album by The Mannish Boys. The label then expanded to other genres. Jackie Payne Steve Edmonson Band's Master of the Game released in 2006 was the label's first release in soul/R&B. The label's releases are newly recorded materials for the most part, but it has also released some albums that were produced by Chortkoff as independent productions and released by the German record label CrossCut (Kirk Fletcher's Shades of Blue and Frank "Paris Slim" Goldwasser's bluju).

Apart from its own releases, Delta Groove Productions produced Roy Gaines' The First TB Album, released by Black Gold in 2003.

In 2007, Delta Groove started a new record label, Eclecto Groove Records, as a home and showcase for other musical styles. In June, 2007, Chortkoff hired industry veteran Robert Fitzpatrick (who died in 2010) to become president of Delta Groove Music and Eclecto Groove Records.

=== Selected artists ===
- Arthur Adams
- Elvin Bishop
- Bob Corritore
- Sean Costello
- Kirk Fletcher
- Kara Grainger
- Henry Gray
- Terry Hanck
- Candye Kane
- Smokin' Joe Kubek
- Bnois King
- John Long
- Lynwood Slim
- The Mannish Boys
- R.J. Mischo
- Tracy Nelson
- Jackie Payne
- Rod Piazza & the Mighty Flyers
- Shawn Pittman
- Ana Popović
- John Primer
- Sugaray Rayford
- Jason Ricci
- Tail Dragger
- Rick Vito
- Phillip Walker
- Monster Mike Welch
- Mike Zito

=== Delta Groove releases ===
Date	No.	Artist	Title	Remarks
November 16, 2004	DGPCD100	The Mannish Boys	That Represent Man	
November 16, 2004	DGPCD101	Kirk Fletcher	Shades of Blue	CrossCut reissue
March 22, 2005	DGPCD102	Hollywood Blue Flames	Soul Sanctuary	reissue
March 22, 2005	DGPCD103	Mitch Kashmar	Nickels & Dimes	
July 19, 2005	DGPCD104	Rod Piazza & the Mighty Flyers	For The Chosen Who [CD + DVD]	
November 15, 2005	DGPCD105	The Mannish Boys	Live & In Demand	
February 21, 2006	DGPCD106	John Long	Lost & Found	
June 20, 2006	DGPCD107	Hollywood Blue Flames	Road To Rio (w/bonus disc: Larger Than Life by Hollywood Fats Band) [2CD]	
June 20, 2006	DGPCD108	Lynwood Slim	Last Call	
September 19, 2006	DGPCD109	Mitch Kashmar	Wake Up & Worry	
October 17, 2006	DGPCD110	Jackie Payne Steve Edmonson Band	Master of the Game	
November 21, 2006	DGPCD111	Phantom Blues Band	Out of the Shadows	
November 1, 2006	DGPCD112	Various Artists	Road Tested V.1 [Limited Edition]	
November 1, 2006	DGPCD113	Phantom Blues Band	Sneaking' A Peek [5-song EP]	
February 20, 2007	DGPCD114	Frank "Paris Slim" Goldwasser	bluju	CrossCut reissue
February 20, 2007	DGPCD115	Phillip Walker	Going Back Home	
May 22, 2007	DGPCD116	The Mannish Boys	Big Plans	
August 21, 2007	DGPCD117	The Insomniacs	Left Coast Blues	reissue
August 21, 2007	DGPCD118	Rod Piazza & the Mighty Flyers Blues Quartet	ThrillVille	
2007	DGPCD119	Phantom Blues Band	Footprints	
2008	DGPCD120	Sean Costello	We Can Get Together	
2008	DGPCD121	The Legendary Rhythm & Blues Revue (featuring Tommy Castro)	Command Performance [live]	
June 17, 2008	DGPCD122	The Mannish Boys	Lowdown Feelin'	
July 22, 2008	DGPCD123	Jackie Payne Steve Edmonson Band	Overnight Sensation	
2008	DGPCD124	Bill Sims Jr. and Mark LaVoie	American Blues Roots Duo	Digital download only
August 19, 2008	DGPCD125	Los Fabulocos (featuring Kid Ramos)	Los Fabulocos	
September 23, 2008	DGPCD126	Elvin Bishop	The Blues Roll On	
October 21, 2008	DGPCD127	Cedric Burnside and Lightnin' Malcolm	2 Man Wrecking Crew	
November 18, 2008	DGPCD128	Mitch Kashmar	Live at Labatt	
February 17, 2009	DGPCD129	Bobby Jones (featuring the Mannish Boys)	Comin' Back Hard	
2009	DGPCD130	The Insomniacs	At Least I'm Not With You	
2008	DGPCD131	Various Artists / 3rd Annual Delta Groove All Star Blues Revue	Live at Ground Zero, Vol. 1	
2008	DGPCD132	Various Artists / 3rd Annual Delta Groove All Star Blues Revue	Live at Ground Zero, Vol. 2	
2009	DGPCD133	Candye Kane	Superhero	
2009	DGPCD134	Rod Piazza & the Mighty Flyers Blues Quartet	Soul Monster	
2009	DGPCD135	Arthur Adams	Stomp the Floor	
2010	DGPCD136	Hollywood Blue Flames	Deep In America (w/bonus disc: Larger Than Life, Vol. 2 by Hollywood Fats Band) [2CD]	
2010	DGPCD137	The Mannish Boys	Shake For Me: 5 Year Anniversary	
2010	DGPCD138	Elvin Bishop	Red Dog Speaks	
2010	DGPCD139	Bob Corritore and Friends	Harmonica Blues	
2010	DGPCD140	Mitch Kashmar and The Pontiax	100 Miles To Go	reissue
2010	DGPCD141	Lynwood Slim and the Igor Prado Band	Brazilian Kicks	
2011	DGPCD142	Los Fabulocos (featuring Kid Ramos)	Dos	
2011	DGPCD143	Tracy Nelson	Victim of the Blues	
2011	DGPCD144	Elvin Bishop	Raisin' Hell Revue (Live on the Legendary Rhythm & Blues Cruise)	
2011	DGPCD145	Shawn Pittman	Edge of the World	
2011	DGPCD146	Terry Hanck	Look Out! (Greasy Soul Rockin' Blues)	
2011	DGPCD147	Rod Piazza & the All Mighty Flyers	Almighty Dollar	
2011	DGPCD148	Candye Kane (featuring Laura Chavez)	Sister Vagabond	
2011	DGPCD149	Big Pete [Pieter Van Der Pluijm]	Choice Cuts	
2012	DGPCD150	Tail Dragger and Bob Corritore	Longtime Friends in the Blues	
2012	DGPCD151	Nathan James and the Rhythm Scratchers	What You Make of It	
2012	DGPCD152	R.J. Mischo	Make It Good	
2012	DGPCD153	The Mannish Boys	Double Dynamite [2CD]	
2012	DGPCD154	The Blues Broads (Dorothy Morrison, Tracy Nelson, Angela Strehli, Annie Sampson)	Live [CD + DVD]	
2012	DGPCD155	Smokin' Joe Kubek & Bnois King	Close To the Bone: Unplugged	
2012	DGPCD156	Adrianna Marie	I Idolize You [4-song EP]	
2013	DGPCD157	Kevin Selfe	Long Walk Home	
2013	DGPCD158	Andy T – Nick Nixon Band	Drink Drank Drunk	
2013	DGPCD159	John Primer and Bob Corritore	Knockin' Around These Blues	
2013	DGPCD160	The Mighty Mojo Prophets	Flyin' Back From Memphis	
2013	DGPCD161	Sugaray Rayford	Dangerous	
2013	DGPCD162	Smokin' Joe Kubek & Bnois King	Road Dog's Life	
2014	DGPCD163	Bob Corritore	Taboo: Blues Harmonica Instrumentals	
2014	DGPCD164	The Terry Hanck Band and Friends	Gotta Bring It On Home to You	
2014	DGPCD165	The Mannish Boys	Wrapped Up and Ready	
2014	DGPCD166	Andy T – Nick Nixon Band	Livin' It Up	
2015	DGPCD167	Igor Prado Band and Delta Groove All Stars	Way Down South	
2015	DGPCD168	Rick Vito	Mojo On My Side	
2015	DGPCD169	Henry Gray and Bob Corritore	The Henry Gray/Bob Corritore Sessions, Vol. 1: Blues Won't Let Me Take My Rest	
2015	DGPCD170	Andy Santana and the West Coast Play Boys	Watch Your Step!	
2015	DGPCD171	Anthony Geraci and the Boston Blues All-Stars	Fifty Shades of Blue	
2016	DGPCD172	Big Jon Atkinson and Bob Corritore	House Party At Big Jon's	
2016	DGPCD173	John Long	Stand Your Ground	
2016	DGPCD174	Mitch Kashmar	West Coast Toast	
2017	DGPCD175	John Primer and Bob Corritore	Ain't Nothing You Can Do!	
2017	DGPCD176	Monster Mike Welch and Mike Ledbetter	Right Place, Right Time	

=== Eclecto Groove releases ===
Date	No.	Artist	Title	Remarks
2007	EGRCD501	Ana Popović	Still Making History	
2007	EGRCD502	Jason Ricci & New Blood	Rocket Number 9	
2008	EGRCD503	Mike Zito	Today	
2009	EGRCD504	The Soul Of John Black	Black John	
2009	EGRCD505	Jason Ricci & New Blood	Done With The Devil	
2009	EGRCD507	Ana Popović	Blind For Love	
2009	EGRCD508	Mike Zito	Pearl River	
2010	EGRCD509	Nick Curran & the Lowlifes	Reform School Girl	
2010	EGRCD511	Kirk Fletcher	My Turn	
2011	EGRCD512	Mike Zito	Greyhound	
2011	EGRCD513	Ana Popović	Unconditional	
2013	EGRCD514	Kara Grainger	Shiver & Sigh	
2014	EGRCD515	Shane Dwight	This House	
2014	EGRCD516	Alastair Greene Band	Trouble At Your Door	
2015	EGRCD517	My Own Holiday	Reason To Bleed	
