= Percy Strother =

American singer

- Born: Percy Lee Strother; July 23, 1946; Vicksburg, Mississippi, United States
- Died: May 29, 2005 (aged 58) Minneapolis, Minnesota, United States
- Genres: Electric blues
- Occupations: Guitarist, singer, songwriter
- Instruments: Guitar, human voice
- Years active: 1970s–2005
- Label: Various including JSP Records

Percy Lee Strother (July 23, 1946 – May 29, 2005) was an American electric blues guitarist, singer and songwriter. After a tragic start in life, from the mid 1970s, Strother went on to become a mainstay of the Minneapolis blues scene. His music was a blend of blues, rhythm and blues and Memphis soul, and his more noteworthy songs included "Blow Wind Blow", "Down Home Blues", "Killing Floor", "Grits Ain't Groceries", "Red Rooster", and "Take My Love".

== Life and career ==
Strother was born in Vicksburg, Mississippi, United States. His father met a violent end when he was hanged for allegedly killing a white man, and his mother died when he was aged 14. Opting to not enter an orphanage, Strother drifted from place to place, and job to job. His lifestyle was not aided by becoming an alcoholic, although he slowly taught himself to play the guitar and adopted more sober ways. He was influenced by the work of Muddy Waters, Little Walter, Howlin' Wolf and Wilson Pickett. In the 1960s he moved north away from Mississippi, and having played in various locations, Strother eventually settled in Minneapolis, Minnesota.

He recorded his debut album, A Good Woman is Hard to Find, in 1992. In the Living Blues Awards, the title song of the album was rewarded as the Best Blues Song of 1992, and the album was runner-up in the Best Blues Album category. Strother was also featured by both Block Magazine and Blues & Rhythm. The same year, he supplied guest vocals on R.J. Mischo & the Teddy Morgan Blues Band's album, Ready to Go. In 1993, Strother undertook a tour which included dates in the Netherlands and Belgium, and he performed live on Dutch radio. By June the following year, his next tour added France and Germany to his list of European concert performance venues.

His second album, The Highway Is My Home, was released in 1995. It included ten tracks written by Strother, and a couple of cover versions of Magic Sam songs in "I'm Tore Down" and "Easy Baby." Pat Hayes of the Lamont Cranston Band played guest harmonica on Strother's reworking of Little Walter's tune, "One Of These Mornings." Another track, "Forty Days and Forty Nights", had earlier appeared as one of Strother's contributions to Ready To Go. The liner notes to the album quoted Lazy Bill Lucas as saying "Mercy, Mr. Percy!" after hearing Strother sing. The Highway Is My Home was released by the Dutch record label, Black Magic Records. In April 1995, Strother appeared at the Burnley National Blues Festival, in Burnley, Lancashire, England. Strother also performed at the Twin Cities Hot Summer Jazz Festival.

It's My Time was Strother's third album, which was issued by JSP Records in 1997. One reviewer noted that it "has a set of terrific original songs which effectively showcase his raging, soulful roar and his blistering guitar". This was followed by Home at Last (1998), which was recorded in Europe during one of his tours. The album was aimed as a tribute to those earlier blues musicians who had inspired him in his early years. By this time, Strothers had become a local celebrity in Minneapolis, as he and Lazy Bill Lucas amongst others had helped develop the blues scene in that area.

Strother was later diagnosed with liver cancer, and he died in his adopted hometown on May 29, 2005, at the age of 58.

== Discography ==
=== Albums ===
Year	Title	Record label
1992	A Good Woman is Hard to Find	Blue Loon Records
1995	The Highway Is My Home	Black Magic Records
1997	It's My Time	JSP Records
1998	Home at Last	Black & Tan Records

== See also ==
- List of electric blues musicians
