= Shawn Pittman =

Shawn Pittman may refer to:

- Shawn Pittman (rugby union)
- Shawn Pittman (musician)
