= Terry Hanck =

- Born: December 29, 1944 (age 81); Chicago, Illinois, United States
- Genres: Electric blues, soul blues
- Occupations: Saxophonist, singer, songwriter and record producer
- Instruments: Vocals, tenor saxophone
- Years active: 1970s–present
- Label: Various including Delta Groove Productions
- Website: terryhanck.net/band.html

Terry Hanck (born December 29, 1944) is an American electric blues saxophonist, singer, songwriter and record producer, who won a Blues Music Award in 2016 in the 'Instrumentalist – Horn' category. Previously Hanck earned both a Blues Music Award and a Living Blues Award for 'Best Horn' in 2012, and was nominated for the latter prize in the 'Best Song' category. In May 2015, he won the International Songwriting Competition for his soul ballad, "I Keep On Holding On." Born in Chicago, Hanck was influenced by the blues, soul and jazz of the 1950s and early 1960s. After moving to California in 1965, Hanck later toured with Elvin Bishop for over a decade, before leaving to tour and record with his own band for now almost 30 years.

Living Blues writer Lee Hildebrand has written that "Hanck is one of the most formidable saxophonists in the blues and soul business. He has a virile tone and attack and an uncanny command of upper-register notes."

== Life and career ==
Hanck was born in Chicago, Illinois, United States. He took up playing the saxophone shortly before his 21st birthday. In 1967, Hanck relocated on a permanent basis to Orange County, California. He moved again in 1969 to San Francisco, before starting his own band, the Grayson Street Houserockers, the following year. The outfit briefly included the guitarist Luther Tucker. Hanck's music was inspired by the work in the 1950s of Fats Domino, Ray Charles, B. B. King, Lee Allen and King Curtis. He saw both King and Charles in concert in the early 1960s. However his band's music did not reach a large audience, although one who did see them perform was Elvin Bishop who asked Hanck to join his band. Hanck played on Bishop's album, Struttin' My Stuff (1975), which included the hit single, "Fooled Around and Fell in Love." In 1977, Hanck finally joined Bishop's band at the third time of asking. He remained until 1987 when he left to form his own outfit, although the two reunited on Bishop's 2011 live album, Raising Hell Revue. Previously Hanck had re-joined his friend on the 2010 Legendary Rhythm & Blues Cruise, and subsequent live album release.

In 1998, Terry Hanck & The Soulrockers performed at the Notodden Blues Festival. In 2001, at the age of 21, Christoffer "Kid" Andersen moved to the United States and joined Hanck's band, and became a figure on the West Coast blues scene. In 2002, Hanck released his solo album, I Keep On Holdin' On. AllMusic noted of Hanck's 2005 album, Night Train, that he "is a competent journeyman set of old school-style R&B, mixing covers with Terry Hanck originals. The covers give a good sense of where Hanck is coming from, as he selects songs from the catalogs of Sam Cooke, Fats Domino, Hank Ballard, and Little Willie John. He plays good smoky saxophone in the spirit of Junior Walker".

Andersen has appeared on, and co-produced all of Hanck's releases, since I Keep On Holdin' On. However, in 2004, Johnny "Cat" Soubrand replaced Andersen in Hanck's backing ensemble. In 2008, Always, showcased Hanck's humor when it included his self-penned track entitled, "Deep Fried Twinkies." In 2011, Look Out! was Hanck's first outing on the Delta Groove Productions label.

His album, Gotta Bring It On Home to You (2014), included contributions from guitarists Kid Andersen and Debbie Davies. It incorporated an equal mixture of Hanck's own compositions and cover versions of others' work. The covers included one of Elvin Bishop's songs, "Right Now Is the Hour." Hanck has produced (or co-produced) all of his albums.

Hanck's saxophone or arrangement work has appeared on various albums by J.P. Soars (Full Moon Night in Memphis), Rick Estrin & The Nightcats (One Wrong Turn), R.C. Finnigan (Heart Body and Soul), Mickey Thomas (As Long As You Love Me), Little Smokey Smothers (Chicago Blues Buddies), Jackie Payne (Partners in the Blues), Alice Stuart (Crazy with the Blues), Steve Freund ("C" for Chicago), Amos Garrett (I Make My Home in My Shoes), Tracy Nelson (Ebony and Irony), and several Elvin Bishop recordings, among others.

== Current band ==
- Johnny "Cat" Soubrand (guitar)
- Tim Wagar (bass)
- Butch Cousins (drums)

== Discography ==
=== Albums ===
Year	Title	Record label	Credited to
1997	Live & Raw	Live & Raw Records	Terry Hanck and The Soulrockers
2002	I Keep On Holdin' On	Mo' Muscle Records	Terry Hanck
2005	Night Train	TVR Records	Terry Hanck
2008	Always	TVR/Vizz Tone	Terry Hanck
2011	Look Out! (Greasy Soul Rockin' Blues)	Delta Groove Productions	Terry Hanck
2014	Gotta Bring It On Home To You	Delta Groove Productions	The Terry Hanck Band and Friends
2016	From Roadhouse To Your House – Live!	TVR/Vizz Tone	The Terry Hanck Band
2019	I Still Get Excited	TVR/Vizz Tone	Terry Hanck

== See also ==
- List of electric blues musicians
