= Roy Gaines =

American blues guitarist (1937–2021)

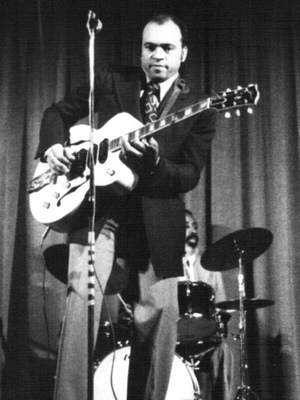
- Gaines in 1977

Background information
- Born: Roy James Gaines; August 12, 1937; Waskom, Texas, U.S.
- Died: August 11, 2021 (aged 83)
- Genres: Texas blues, electric blues
- Occupation(s): Musician, songwriter
- Instrument(s): Guitar, vocals

Roy James Gaines (August 12, 1937 – August 11, 2021) was an American Texas blues and electric blues guitarist, singer and songwriter. He wrote and recorded the song "A Hell of a Night", which was first issued on his 1982 album Gainelining. He was the younger brother of the blues musician Grady Gaines.

== Biography ==
Gaines was born in Waskom, Texas on August 12, 1937, and relocated with his family to Houston when he was six years old. Originally a piano devotee, Gaines moved to playing the guitar in his adolescence. In his teens he was acquainted with another budding guitarist, Johnny Copeland. By the age of 14 he had performed onstage backing his hero, T-Bone Walker, and played in Houston nightclubs. He later moved to Los Angeles, California. In 1955, Gaines played as a backing musician on recordings by Bobby Bland, Junior Parker and Big Mama Thornton. He later backed Roy Milton and then Chuck Willis, and he worked again with Walker.

He released two low-key albums in 1956 and a couple more in the 1960s for small record companies. In 1966, Gaines became part of Ray Charles's backing band. He was also a backing musician in sessions with the Everly Brothers, the Supremes, Bobby Darin, Stevie Wonder, and Gladys Knight.

He worked primarily as a sideman, but he released a solo album, Gainelining, in 1982. He also had a small part in the 1985 film The Color Purple. Another album, New Frontier Lover, was released in 2000. It was followed by Tuxedo Blues, featuring a big band billed as Roy Gaines & His Orchestra, released in 2009. The album includes the song "Miss Celie's Blues (Sister)," which Gaines had performed in The Color Purple. Also included is a cover version of Michael Jackson's "Rock with You." Gaines co-wrote the song "No Use Crying", which was recorded by George Jones and Ray Charles.

Gaines died on August 11, 2021, a day before his 84th birthday.

== Discography ==
=== Albums ===
Year	Title	Label
1982	Gainelining	Red Lightnin'
1996	Lucille Work for Me	Black Gold
1998	Bluesman for Life	JSP
1999	I Got the T-Bone Walker Blues	Groove Note
2000	New Frontier Lover	Severn
2000	Guitar Clashers From Gainesville, Tokyo (w/Mitsuyoshi Azuma)	P-Vine
2002	Superman	Black & Blue
2002	In the House: Live at Lucerne, Vol. 4	CrossCut (Germany)
2004	The First TB Album	Delta Groove
2005	Rock-A-Billy Boogie Woogie Blues Man	Black Gold
2005	Going Home to See Mama	Black Gold
2009	Tuxedo Blues	Black Gold

With the Jazz Crusaders

- Freedom Sound (Pacific Jazz, 1961)

With Les McCann

- Another Beginning (Atlantic, 1974)
