= The Music Machine (nightclub) =

Music club in West Los Angeles, California, U.S.

- Location of the Music Machine
- Address: 12220 West Pico Boulevard; United States
- Location: West Los Angeles, California
- Coordinates: 34.028639°N 118.451346°W
- Capacity: 205

Construction
- Opened: 1982 (44 years ago)

The Music Machine was a popular nightclub and music venue in West Los Angeles, California. Established in 1982, it had a legal capacity of 500 when it opened but was reduced to 205 by 1986. Its original owner was Hal Glickman, who brought in Gary Fontenot, Michael Myer and Leon McKnabb to assist with its operation. It opened at a time when Whisky a Go Go and Rissmillers, two popular local venues, were temporarily closed. The location was previously the home of the Cowboy and the RF Club.

Notable acts to have played the Music Machine include R.E.M., Guns N' Roses and Red Hot Chili Peppers. On December 7, 1986, Hollywood Fats played his final show at the Music Machine; he died the following day, aged 32.

In the 1990s, the club was known for its reggae and hip-hop nights.
