= John Long (blues musician) =

American singer

- Born: 1950 (age 75–76); St. Louis, Missouri, United States
- Genres: Country blues
- Occupations: Singer, guitarist, harmonicist, songwriter
- Instruments: Guitar, harmonica, vocals
- Years active: 1970s–present
- Label: Delta Groove Productions
- Website: Official website

John Long (born 1950), is an American country blues singer, fingerstyle guitarist, harmonica player and songwriter. He performs in a pre-war acoustic blues style, although his material is contemporary and mainly composed by Long and his elder brother. His mentor and inspiration was Homesick James. In the mid-1970s, Muddy Waters stated that Long was "the best young country blues artist playing today."

In 2017, Long was a nominee for a Blues Music Award in the 'Acoustic Album' category for his collection, Stand Your Ground. He had won the same award for his 2006 album, Lost & Found.

== Life and career ==
He was born in St. Louis, Missouri, United States, and was raised listening to his mother's collection of jazz and R&B record collection. In his teenage years, Long spent time trying to master playing country blues on guitar. He was particularly impressed by the recorded music of Jimmy Reed, Buster Brown, Muddy Waters, Lightnin' Hopkins, and Junior Parker. In the early 1960s, he formed the Mystics with his brother Claude, and they played rock and roll and R&B, before realising that it was the early blues that most interested them.

In the early 1970s, Long relocated to Chicago, Illinois, where he met Homesick James. James became 'adoptive father', mentor and inspiration to Long. In the middle part of that decade, Long was heard performing by Muddy Waters. He stated that Long was "the best young country blues artist playing today." Long continued to perform as time allowed, but did not record any material until 1999, when Long on Blues was issued on cassette by Bottleneck Records. Eventually a demo tape of Long's work was sent to Delta Groove Productions, where he was later signed to the record label. Lost & Found was released by Delta Groove in 2006. AllMusic commented on the record that Long "re-created the sound of a pre-war country blues player, right down to the little Tommy Johnson-like upward vocal swoops he takes at the end of phrases." Long was effectively a 'newcomer' at the age of 59, with one commentator noting "his singing is eerie and haunting, sounding as close to a 1930s recording as any country blues player... While he sounds like the old masters, he performs exciting and original material." Lost & Found won a Blues Music Award in the 'Acoustic Album' category.

By this time Long was living in Springfield, Missouri. Despite the acclaim of his work, Long did not record another album for a decade. In May 2016, Stand Your Ground was released by Delta Groove. For instrumentation, Long added to his normal wooden resonator guitar, by also using a Washburn Montgomery archtop guitar, which he styled as "amplified acoustic." Long wrote eight of the thirteen tracks on Stand Your Ground, and it was recorded in two days at Audiogrand in North Hollywood, Los Angeles, California. The cover numbers included Homesick James's "Baby Please Set a Date," and Blind Willie McTell's "Climbing High Mountains." In addition he recorded a version of Blind Willie Johnson's, "I Know His Blood Can Make Me Whole, " plus a slow tempo rendition of Thomas A. Dorsey's "Precious Lord, Take My Hand." In 2017, Long was again a nominee for a Blues Music Award in the 'Acoustic Album' category.

== Discography ==
Year	Title	Record label
1999	Long on Blues	Bottleneck Records
2006	Lost & Found	Delta Groove Productions
2016	Stand Your Ground	Delta Groove Productions

== See also ==
- List of country blues musicians
- List of blues musicians
