= Morris Pejoe =

American blues singer, guitarist and songwriter (1924–1982)

- Born: Morris Pejas; April 11, 1924; Palmetto, Louisiana, U.S.
- Died: July 27, 1982 (aged 58) Westland, Michigan, U.S.
- Genres: Chicago blues
- Occupations: Singer, guitarist, songwriter
- Instruments: Vocals, guitar, violin
- Years active: 1940s–1960s
- Labels: Checker, Vee-Jay, Abco, Atomic H, Kaytown, Friendly Five, plus Delmark (reissues only)

Morris Pejas (April 11, 1924 – July 27, 1982), billed professionally as Morris Pejoe was an American Chicago blues singer, guitarist, and songwriter. He released a string of singles in the 1950s and 1960s, but saw many of his recordings go unreleased over that period.

== Life and career ==
He was born in Palmetto, Louisiana, United States. He began his career in music playing the violin and absorbed the major music traditions from Louisiana, being cajun and zydeco. In 1949, he relocated to Beaumont, Texas, where he also switched to playing the guitar rather than violin. He was inspired by the playing of Texan-based guitarists Lightnin' Hopkins, T-Bone Walker, and especially Clarence "Gatemouth" Brown. A jump blues formatting then stayed as a factor in Pejoe's work. He met up with the pianist Henry Gray, who remained his regular musical sideman until the mid-1960s. The two moved to Chicago, Illinois in 1951, looking for more regular outlets for their playing and career development. Pejoe also befriended another pianist, Otis Spann, who also worked with Pejoe until Spann joined Muddy Waters band in 1953.

Pejoe unusual playing style for a Chicago bluesman saw him in demand, and he recorded sides in both 1952 and 1953 for Checker Records, accompanied by Gray and various other musicians on percussion and harmonica. Checker issued two singles by Pejoe, but he recorded far more material for them that went unreleased. It was not the only time he suffered that misfortune. In December 1954, he recorded more tracks for United Records, but these were recorded in the basement of the property owned by the record producer, Al Smith. It is thought that the unusual practice was a cost cutting measure by the label, which was near to closing down. The marathon session saw seven Pejoe tracks being recorded which included the noteworthy "Let's Get High". Pejoe recorded two versions of the song. AllMusic noted that one blues critic had stated, upon hearing the track on a later compilation album, that "Cranked-up, distorted classic "Let's Get High" by Morris Pejoe is worth the price alone". Other tracks included "Baby, You Know That's Wrong" (which was reimagined in 1955 for Vee-Jay Records as "Hurt My Feelings") and "May Bea" (something of a stalwart which, titled as "Maybe Blues", Pejoe recorded in 1953 for Chess Records, and reappeared again on Abco Records in 1956). None of these were released then, although they have since seen issue on various compilation records.

Unsurprisingly Pejoe moved elsewhere to record. "Your Gonna Need Me" was recorded in May 1955 for Vee-Jay, with "Hurt My Feelings" on the B-side. Abco (a subsidiary of Cobra Records) was his next port of call, waxing "Screaming and Crying" and "Maybe Blues" in April 1956. Pejoe remained silent for the next four years as far as recordings were concerned. In 1960, Atomic H Records released "She Walked Right In" as a single, but another three tracks went unissued at the time. In 1966, Pejoe had a single released by Friendly Five Records, which included his wife in the mix, and came out credited to Little Mary & Morris Pejae's Band. [sic] His final single release was "Pejoe Soul Strings", a 1969 instrumental on Kaytown Records. During the 1960s, Pejoe performed regularly, often with his wife, the blues singer Mary Lane. They were regular performers at Chicago nightclubs Silvio's and the Squeeze Club. Equally they enjoyed many performance dates in Waukegan, Illinois, where Pejoe and Lane had first met. The break-up of his marriage around 1970 saw Pejoe relocate to Detroit, Michigan, in the early 1970s and the end of his recording career. The couple's daughter, Lynne Lane, performed as a blues singer, as did Pejoe's son, Morris Pejoe Jr.

The 1989 Delmark retrospective entitled Wrapped in My Baby, gained critical acclaim. It included Smith's basement recordings, along with two unreleased tracks from the Atomic H session. The album also included tracks recorded around the same period by Arthur "Big Boy" Spires and Willie "Big Eyes" Smith. Various Pejoe recordings have also appeared on numerous compilation albums.

Morris Pejoe died in Westland, Michigan, on July 27, 1982, at the age of 58.

== Discography ==
=== Compilation albums ===
| Year | Title | Record label | Notes |
|---|---|---|---|
| 1972 | Chicago Ain't Nothin' but a Blues Band | Delmark | Contains four Pejoe tracks |
| 1989 | Wrapped in My Baby | Delmark | Morris Pejoe / Arthur "Big Boy" Spires & Willie "Big Eyes" Smith |
| 2007 | Down Home Blues Classics - Chicago 1946-1954 | Boulevard Vintage Records | Contains three Pejoe numbers (on a four CD set) |
