= Honey Piazza =

American piano player (born 1951)

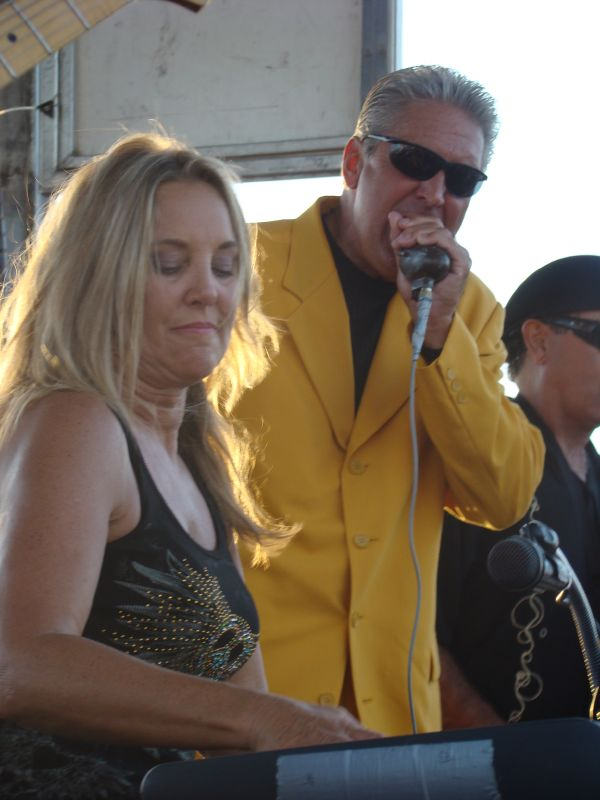
- Honey with Rod Piazza at the Legendary Rhythm & Blues Cruise, 2007

Background information
- Born: April 24, 1951 (age 75); Fairfield, California, United States
- Genres: Blues; Boogie woogie
- Instrument: Piano
- Years active: 1972-present
- Website: The Mighty Flyers' website

Debra "Honey" Piazza (born April 24, 1951) is an American piano player. She is a founding member of the band Rod Piazza and the Mighty Flyers.

== Background ==
Piazza was born in Fairfield, California on April 24, 1951. Her father was in the Air Force and her family moved to England for three years, when she was a child. There she started taking classical piano lessons at the age of four and pursued the lessons until the age of 16 after they had moved back to California. She enjoyed playing jam sessions with her friends, but she really discovered piano blues when she heard a record of Otis Spann. For the next two years she would practice extensively.

In 1972 she went to Chicago, and played with a number of blues musicians. After her return to California she saw a concert of Rod Piazza, who at the time was playing with a band called Bacon Fat. Being impressed with his music she arranged to meet him for an audition. As a result, she joined the band and has played with Rod Piazza ever since.

They got married several years later and reside in Riverside, California.

== Discography ==
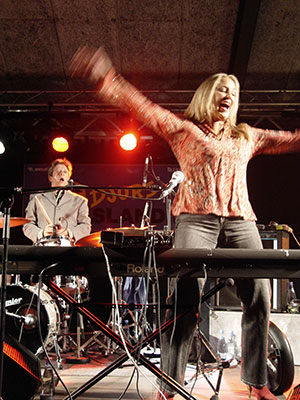
Honey Piazza

(with Rod Piazza & the Mighty Flyers)

- 1981: Radioactive Material (Right Hemisphere)
- 1984: File Under Rock (Takoma)
- 1985: From The Start To The Finnish (Red Lightnin'; US release in 1986 on Pausa)
- 1988: Undercover (Special Delivery)
- 1991: Blues In The Dark (Black Top)
- 1992: Alphabet Blues (Black Top)
- 1994: Live At B.B. King's Blues Club (Big Mo)
- 1997: Tough And Tender (Tone-Cool)
- 1999: Here And Now (Tone-Cool)
- 2001: Beyond The Source (Tone-Cool)
- 2004: Keepin' It Real (Blind Pig)
- 2005: For The Chosen Who (Delta Groove) [CD+DVD]
- 2007: Thrillville (Delta Groove)
- 2009: Soul Monster (Delta Groove)
- 2011: Almighty Dollar (Delta Groove)
- 2014: Emergency Situation (Blind Pig)
- 2017: Live At Fleetwood's (Big Mo) [2CD] - recorded 1993
