= CrossCut Records =

German independent record label

- Founded: 1981
- Status: Titles available through mailorder
- Genre: Blues
- Country of origin: Germany
- Official website: Official website

CrossCut Records is a German independent record label, that was created in 1981 specializing in blues and roots music.

== Background ==
The CrossCut Mailorder service, a division of Bear Family Records, is one of the world's leading sources for blues and related music. In 2004 Bear Family and CrossCut merged their mail order branches.

== Notable artists ==
Listed alphabetically by artist surname.

- Chris Cain
- John Campbell
- Bill Carter
- Otis Clay
- Ronnie Earl
- Terry Evans
- Mark Ford
- Robben Ford
- Dave Goodman, guitarist and singer/songwriter from Victoria B.C., Canada
- Hollywood Fats Band
- John Kay
- Pierre Lacocque
- Colin Linden
- Lee McBee
- Mighty Sam McClain
- R.J. Mischo
- Mississippi Heat
- John Mooney
- Charlie Musselwhite
- Shawn Pittman
- Sherman Robertson
- Jimmy Rogers
- Tom Shaka
- Little Smokey Smothers
- Dave Specter
- Luther Tucker
- Carl Weathersby
- Gary Wiggins
