= Sugaray Rayford =

American singer

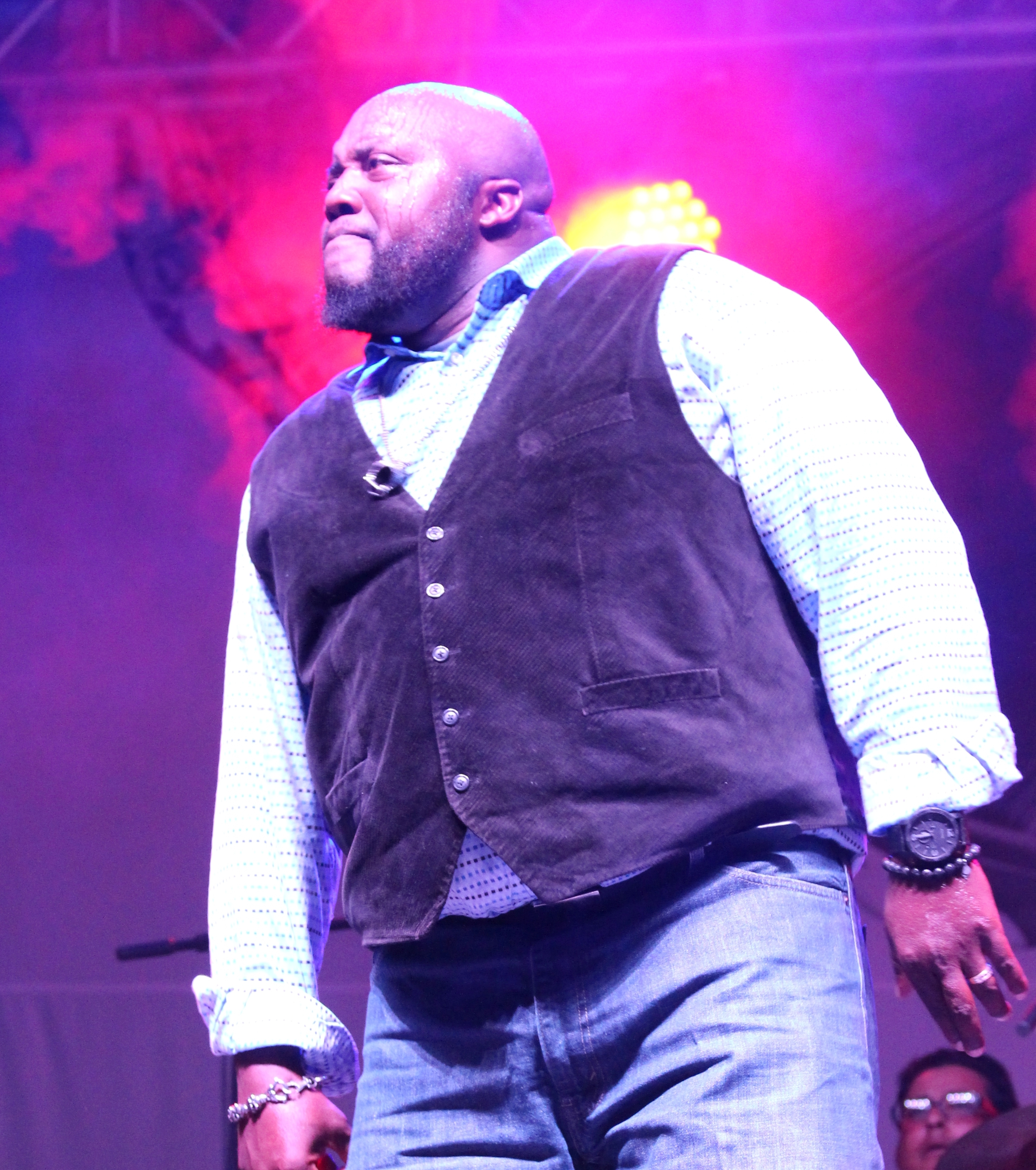
- Sugaray Rayford in 2017 at the Montreal International Jazz Festival

Background information
- Born: Caron Nimoy Rayford; February 13, 1969 (age 57); Smith County, Texas, United States
- Genres: Electric blues, soul blues
- Occupations: Singer and songwriter
- Instrument: Vocals
- Years active: Late 1990s–present
- Label: Forty Below Records
- Website: Official website

Caron Nimoy "Sugaray" Rayford (born February 13, 1969) is an American soul blues singer and songwriter. He has released five albums to date and been granted three Blues Music Awards. Rayford's 2019 album, Somebody Save Me, was nominated for a Grammy Award in the Best Contemporary Blues Album category.

In 2010, Living Blues magazine noted that "Sugaray is a first-rate blues artist with a deep-running, church honed soulfulness." His latest album, In Too Deep, was released on March 4, 2022.

== Biography ==
Rayford was born in Smith County, Texas, United States, and sang at the age of seven in the Bethel Temple Church of God In Christ in Tyler, Texas. He also played the drums there, but his childhood was poverty stricken with his mother dying from cancer early in Rayford's life. “She suffered and we suffered,” Rayford said. “Then, we moved in with my grandmother and our lives were a lot better. We ate every day and we were in church every day, which I loved. I grew up in gospel and soul.”

Living in San Diego, California, he moved to contemporary music at the age of 12, initially singing with the Urban Gypsys. Turning towards the blues he joined the Temecula, California-based Aunt Kizzy's Boyz as lead vocalist. They released their debut album Trunk Full of Blues (2004), and represented San Diego in January 2006 at the International Blues Challenge, where they finished as runners-up. Their second album was It's Tight Like That (2007) and the following year won the LAMN Jam Grand Slam 'Urban Artist of the Year' title. They were offered a distribution deal by RBC Records.

His first solo album was Blind Alley, a self-released affair in 2010. In May 2011, Rayford joined The Mannish Boys. He sang lead vocals on nine of the songs on their album, Double Dynamite, that won the Best Traditional Blues Album title in May 2013 at the Blues Music Awards. In May 2012, Rayford made his stage debut starring in the Tony Award nominated musical, It Ain't Nothin' But the Blues at the Portland Center Stage. After relocating to Los Angeles, he undertook recording studio vocal work, including on the theme for Judge Joe Brown, the movie trailer City Lights and back up vocals for The Heavy Pets.

Dangerous on Delta Groove Productions followed in 2013, and supporting Sugaray were guest performers including Kim Wilson, Kid Andersen, and Sugar Ray Norcia. Norcia wrote a duet for the album, called “Two Times Sugar”. The album debuted at number 2 on Blues Debut Chart, number 6 on the Roots Music Chart and number 2 on The Living Blues Chart. In October 2013, Rayford toured with Kevin Selfe and the Tornadoes.

At the 36th Blues Music Awards, Rayford was nominated in two categories; B.B. King Entertainer and Traditional Blues Male Artist.

In 2014, Rayford performed at the Waterfront Blues Festival in Portland, Oregon.

On May 19, 2015, Rayford released Southside. It featured a guest appearance by Bob Corritore on harmonica. On September 1, 2017, Rayford released his fourth album, The World That We Live In.

On January 9, 2018, Rayford was nominated for four Blues Music Awards for the 39th annual Blues Music Awards. These included 'Soul Blues Album', for The World That We Live In, plus 'Soul Blues Male Artist', 'Instrumentalist - Vocals', and 'B.B. King Entertainer'. At the 40th Blues Music Awards in 2019, Rayford was named as 'Soul Blues Male Artist of the Year'. Rayford's fifth album, Somebody Save Me, was nominated for a Grammy Award in the Best Contemporary Blues Album category.

In May 2020, Rayford was presented with two Blues Music Awards for 'B.B King Entertainer of the Year' and 'Soul Blues Male Artist of the Year'. His next album, In Too Deep, was released on March 4, 2022. The album was cited as 'Soul Blues Album of the Year' at the 2023 Blues Music Awards.

== Discography ==
=== Albums ===
Album title	Record label	Year
Blind Alley	Sugaray (self released)	2010
Dangerous	Delta Groove Productions	2013
Southside	NimoySue Records	2015
The World That We Live In	Blind Faith Records	2017
Somebody Save Me	Forty Below Records	2019
In Too Deep	Forty Below Records	2022
Human Decency	Forty Below Records	2024

== See also ==
- List of electric blues musicians
