= Jackie Payne =

American blues singer (born 1945)

Jackie Payne (born September 26, 1945) is an American blues singer. He was nominated in both 2007 and 2008 for the Blues Music Award for Best Male Soul Blues Artist; an album he recorded with Johnny Otis was nominated for a Grammy Award in 1993. He is the nephew of the blues harmonica player Neal Pattman.

== Biography ==
=== Early career ===
Payne was born in Athens, Georgia, United States. His original birth name was William, and he was known as Willie during childhood. He trained as a singer in his father's gospel choir and learned the blues from his uncle, Neal Pattman, who played harmonica. By the age of 13, he was singing professionally with the Allen Swing Band in Atlanta. He later joined an R&B group called The Serenaders. He moved to Houston, Texas in 1963, at the age of 17, and recorded his first regional hit, "Go Go Train" b/w "I'll Be Home" on the Jetstream label in 1965. The success of that single led to a 45-city tour with the Stax revue, which at the time featured headliners like Otis Redding (to whom Payne's voice has sometimes been compared), Sam & Dave, Rufus Thomas, and Carla Thomas. His career was checked when he entered the United States Army in 1968. He then settled in Culver City, California, performing at The Cover Girl Club with Pee Wee Crayton.

=== Johnny Otis years ===
Payne was the lead singer for the Johnny Otis Show for fifteen years. He recorded several albums with Otis's band and appeared for many years on the Johnny Otis Saturday morning live radio show broadcast on KPFA-FM. Spirit of the Black Territory Bands, recorded by The Johnny Otis Orchestra, featured Payne on vocals and was nominated for a 1993 Grammy Award. Payne's 1998 CD, A Day In the Life of a Blues Man, was produced by Kenny Blue Ray for the British JSP Records label.

=== Jackie Payne Steve Edmonson Band ===
Payne and blues guitarist Steve Edmonson, formed the Jackie Payne Steve Edmonson Band in the late 1990s. The band, which was based in the San Francisco Bay Area, has recorded three albums, Partners in the Blues on the Burnside Records label, Master of the Game and Overnight Sensation on the Delta Groove label. The band won the Contemporary Blues Award for Best Soul Blues Album of 2006 for the Master of the Game.
