= Lynwood Slim =

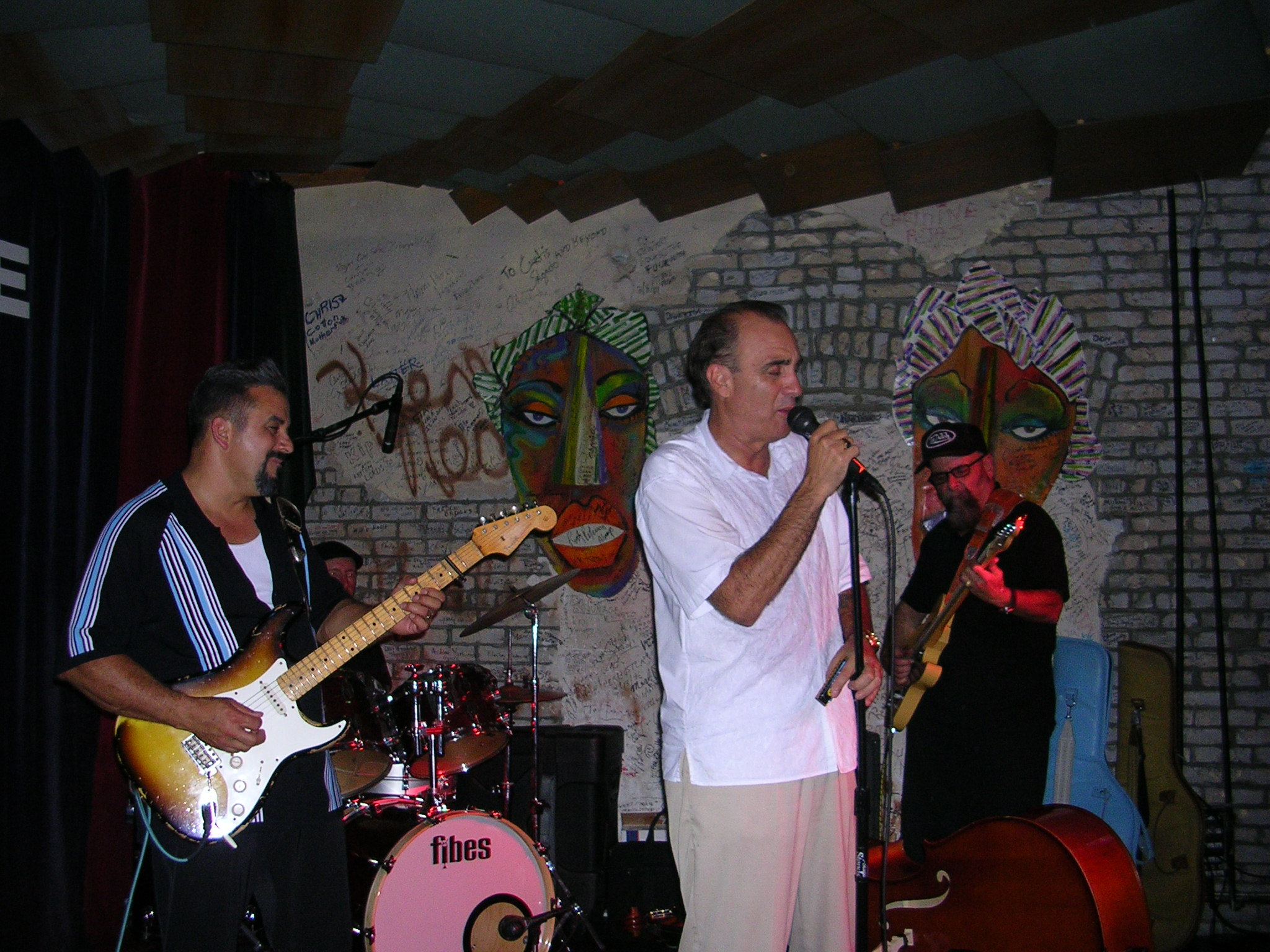
- Lynwood Slim with Larry Taylor and Kid Ramos, (2005)

Background information
- Born: Richard Dennis Duran; August 19, 1953; Los Angeles, California, United States
- Died: August 4, 2014 (aged 60)
- Genres: Blues
- Instruments: Harmonica, flute, vocals
- Years active: 1970s–2014
- Label: Delta Groove
- Website: www.lynwoodslim.com

Lynwood Slim (born Richard Dennis Duran, August 19, 1953, Los Angeles, California; died August 4, 2014) was an American blues harmonica player and singer. Slim was best known as a singer in the style of smooth easy jazz/blues, as well as his harmonica and flute playing.

== Biography ==
Slim started playing the trumpet at age 18, and the harmonica when he was 15. His early influences included Jimmy Reed, Little Walter and Big Walter Horton. He played the Los Angeles music scene then moved to Minneapolis, Minnesota in 1974. He became a major force on the music scene, winning awards for best blues band in 1986.

Slim moved to Amsterdam, the Netherlands in 1988, returned to Los Angeles later that same year. He started working with Junior Watson, as well as Hollywood Fats Band alumni Larry Taylor, Fred Kaplan and Richard Innes. He started playing the flute after listening to James Moody and Herbie Mann.

Recording credits included a number of solo albums as well as numerous as a guest performer, producer, engineer, arranger and songwriter. Slim was latterly currently signed to Delta Groove, an independent record label based in Van Nuys, California. He toured and recorded in the United States as well as Europe, South America and Australia.

Slim's health declined from early 2011. Initially he was diagnosed with hepatitis C, which he overcame, but the damage to his liver caused cirrhosis. In late 2011, Slim was given news that without a liver transplant he would only survive for two years. In July 2014, he suffered a stroke and died from mounting health challenges on August 4, 2014. Slim did not have health insurance and his family accepted donations through his website.

== Discography ==
- 1996: Soul Feet (Atomic Theory ATM1121)
- 1991: Lost in America (Black Magic CD9017)
- 1994: Too Small to Dance (Black Magic CD9025) with Big Rhythm Combo (featuring Kid Ramos)
- 1997: Lost in America (Atomic Theory ATM1135)
- 1998: Back to Back (CrossCut 11059) with Junior Watson
- 1998: Off The Wall Jive (Gold Plate GP220371) with Mannie & The Swingin' Hipshakers (featuring Kid Ramos, Otis Grand)
- 1999: Too Small to Dance (Pacific Blues PBRC9902) reissue
- 1999: World Wide Wood (Pacific Blues PBRC9903)
- 2006: Last Call (Delta Groove DGPCD108)
- 2010: Brazilian Kicks (Delta Groove DGPCD141) with Igor Prado Band
- 2014: Hard to Kill (Rip Cat RC1116) featuring Johnny "Cat" Soulbrand, The Red Wagons, Alberto Colombo, Nico Duportal, Kid Ramos, Trickbag, Fariz Bouzit, Bluescrowns, Igor Prado Band, Mark Dufresne.
