= Junior Watson =

American jump blues guitarist and singer

Junior Watson is an American jump blues guitarist and singer.

== Career ==
Watson is a West Coast blues guitarist. He was a founding member of the blues band The Mighty Flyers and, starting in the early 1980s, he performed with the band for a decade. He also performed with Canned Heat throughout the 1990s. Watson has performed as a backing musician in performances and recordings for a number of blues musicians, including Big Mama Thornton, George Smith, Jimmy Rogers, Luther Tucker, Charlie Musselwhite, Mark Hummel, John Németh, Michael "Pink" Arguello, and Kim Wilson.

== Discography ==
=== As leader ===
- Long Overdue – 1994 (Black Top 1099)
- Back To Back – 1998 (Crosscut CCD 11059) with Lynwood Slim
- If I Had A Genie – 2002 (Heart & Soul 10799)
- Jumpin' Wit Junior – 2012 (Regal Radio Records 10038)
- Live From Outer Space – 2012 (Bluebeat Music 103) with The Red Wagons
- Nothin' to It But to Do It – 2019 (Little Village Foundation 1033)

=== Session works (in alphabetical order) ===
- Kid Andersen – Rock Awhile – 2003 (Blue Soul 2312)
- Bharath & His Rhythm Four – Friday Night Fatty – 2007 (Fatty 2078)
- Bishop / Milite – North South East West – 2004 (Sovereign Records) with JW-Jones, Mark Hummel, and Gary Primich
- Big Al Blake & The Hollywood Fats Band – Mr. Blake's Blues – 1997 (Blue Collar 7108)
- Brenda Burns – A Song Away From You – 1997 (Big Boss)
- Canned Heat – Reheated – 1988 (SPV 858805; Chameleon/Elektra 89022)
- Canned Heat – Burnin' [live] – 1991 (SPV 848857)
- Canned Heat – Live in Australia – 1993 (Aim 1003)
- Canned Heat – Internal Combustion – 1994 (Aim 1044)
- Canned Heat – Canned Heat Blues Band – 1997 (Rowyno 5020; Ruf 1040)
- Chicago Flying Saucers – LIVE – 1997
- William Clarke – Can't You Hear Me Calling – 1983 (Watch Dog 1005)
- William Clarke – Tip of the Top – 1987 (Satch 102; Double Trouble [Netherlands] 3016; King Ace 1063)
- William Clarke & Junior Watson – Double Dealin' [1983 sessions] – 2010 (Bluebeat Music 102)
- Teisco Del Rey – The Many Moods of Teisco Del Rey – 1992 (Upstart 007)
- Johnny Dyer – Johnny Dyer & The L.A. Jukes – 1983 (Murray Brothers, 1004; Blind Pig 5028)
- James Harman – Thank You Baby – 1983 (Enigma 1033)
- James Harman – Extra Napkins – 1988 (Rivera 505; Cannonball 29102)
- James Harman – Mo' Na'kins, Please! – 2000 (Cannonball 29112)
- Shakey Jake Harris – The Key Won't Fit – 1983 (Murray Brothers, 1002)
- Blues Harp Meltdown Vol 1 – 2000 (Mountain Top 101) with Kim Wilson, Rick Estrin, James Harman, Mark Hummel, Billy Branch and others
- Mark Hummel – Hard Lovin' 1990s – 1992 (Double Trouble [Netherlands] 3029)
- JW-Jones – Bluelisted – 2008 (NorthernBlues Music 0046)
- Candye Kane – Guitar'd And Feathered – 2007 (Ruf Records 1127)
- Mitch Kashmar Featuring Junior Watson – Nickels & Dimes – 2005 (Delta Groove 103)
- Mitch Kashmar – Wake Up & Worry – 2006 (Delta Groove 109)
- John "Juke" Logan – The Chill – 1993 (Virgin [France] 87834-2; Mocombo Records 55006)
- Lynwood Slim – Lost in America – 1991 (Black Magic [Netherlands] 9017)
- Janiva Magness & Jeff Turmes – It Takes One To Know One – 1997 (Fathead 1001)
- Mark Hummel – Lowdown to Uptown – 1997 (Tone Cool 1169)
- The Mighty Flyers – Radioactive Material – 1981 (Right Hemisphere 6457)
- The Mighty Flyers – File Under Rock – 1984 (Tacoma 7108)
- The Mighty Flyers – From The Start to the Finnish – 1985 (Right Hemisphere 8568)
- The Mighty Flyers – Undercover – 1988 (Special Delivery SPD 1020)
- The Mighty Mojo Prophets – The Mighty Mojo Prophets – 2011 (Rip Cat Records 1102)
- Charlie Musselwhite – In My Time – 1993 (Alligator ALCD 4818)
- Charlie Musselwhite – Rough News – 1997 (Point Blank/Virgin 42856)
- Dan E Bungee – Jamm'in With Junior – 2002 (East Coast Left Coast Sessions)
- John Németh featuring Junior Watson – Come And Get It – 2004
- John Németh – Magic Touch – 2007 (Blind Pig 5109)
- Rod Piazza – Harpburn – 1986 (Murray Brothers, 1008; Black Top 1087)
- Snooky Pryor – In This Mess Up to My Chest – 2000 (Antone's 0028)
- Raoul and The Big Time – Cold Outside – 2004 (Big Time Records BTRCD-002)
- Raoul and The Big Time – You My People – 2009 (Big Time Records BTRCD- 004)
- Raoul and The Big Time – Hollywood Blvd – 2014 (Big Time Records BTRCD -006)
- Kid Ramos – West Coast House Party – 2000 (Evidence 26110)
- The Red Wagons – Jumpin' With Friends! – 2012 (independent release/CD Baby) with Sugar Ray Norcia, Lynwood Slim, Mitch Woods, Igor Prado, and Sax Gordon Beadle
- Sonny Rhodes – I Don't Want My Blues Colored Bright – 1976 (Amigo CD 9024)
- Rob Rio – Banking on the Boogie – 1992 (Boss 004)
- Rob Rio – Fine Young Girl – 1994 (Boss 005)
- Rob Rio – Swing Train – 1996 (Boss 006)
- Jimmy Rogers – Feelin' Good – 1984 (Murray Brothers, 1006; Blind Pig 5018)
- Andy Santana & The West Coast Playboys – Swingin' Rockin' Jumpin' & Jivin' – 1998
- Gary Smith – Blues For Mr. B – 2001 (Mountain Top)
- George "Harmonica" Smith – Boogie'n With George – 1982 (Murray Brothers, 1001; Blind Pig 5049)
- Bill Stuve – Big Noise – 1990 (Tramp 9906)
- Nick Trill – Juggling The Blues – 1999
- Billy Watson – Blowin' Crow – 2007
- Billy Watson – Lucky 7 – 2009
- Kim Wilson – Tiger Man – 1993 (Antone's 0023)
- Kim Wilson- That's Life – 1994 (Antone's 0034)
- Kim Wilson – My Blues – 1997 (Blue Collar 7107)
- Various artists – The Blues You Just Would Hate To Lose, Volume 1 [project sampler] – 1996 (Right on Rhythm)
