= Hollywood Fats =

American blues guitarist (1954–1986)

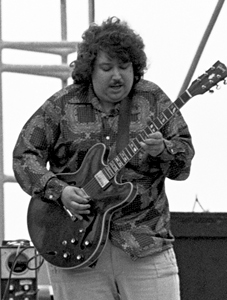
Mann in 1979

Michael Leonard Mann (March 17, 1954 – December 8, 1986), known as Hollywood Fats, was an American blues guitarist, active in Los Angeles, California.

== Biography ==
Hollywood Fats was born in Los Angeles and started playing guitar at the age of 10. While he was in his teens, his mother would drive him to various clubs in South Central Los Angeles to jam with well-known blues musicians when they came to town. Hollywood Fats' father was a doctor and his siblings went on to become doctors and lawyers. He met Buddy Guy and Junior Wells who gave him the nickname. Hollywood Fats toured with James Harman, Jimmy Witherspoon, J. B. Hutto, John Lee Hooker, Muddy Waters, and Albert King.

During the 1970s and 1980s, he worked with the blues harmonica player and singer James Harman. He played on a number of his records including Thank You Baby; Those Dangerous Gentlemans; Extra Napkins (Strictly the Blues); Mo' Na' Kins, Please! (Strictly the Blues, Vol. 2); and Strictly Live In '85 (Vol. 1). Other guitarists with whom he played included Junior Watson, Kid Ramos, and Dave Alvin.

Hollywood Fats was invited to be a sideman to Muddy Waters and later met the harmonica player Al Blake. Blake had just moved to Los Angeles from Oklahoma. In 1974, Fats, Blake and pianist Fred Kaplan, who garnered drummer Richard Innes and bassist Jerry Smith from Rod Piazza's Bacon Fat band who had recorded with George "Harmonica" Smith on the Blue Horizon label. Soon after Canned Heat bassist Larry Taylor replaced Smith and they started calling themselves the "Hollywood Fats Band".

For a King Biscuit Flower Hour concert on September 7, 1979, which was later to be released on LP and CD, Hollywood Fats played the lead guitar in Canned Heat.

The Hollywood Fats Band released a self-titled album in 1979, the only album under their name. The band broke up not long after and Hollywood Fats continued to play with Harman's band.

Fats joined The Blasters in 1986, replacing Dave Alvin. In 1988, the Los Angeles Times recalled his "bottomless well of musical ideas and outwardly effortless technique."

Hollywood Fats also played with a non-blues band called Dino's Revenge from 1985 until 1986. He recorded three songs with Dino's Revenge as well as playing several live performances. The band consisted of Marshall Rohner of T.S.O.L. as well as Kevan Hill, Butch Azevedo, and Steven Ameche, all of The Twisters.

Hollywood Fats died of a heart attack in 1986 in Los Angeles at the age of 32, the day after a show at the Music Machine in West Los Angeles. The attack was drug-induced. In addition to being a known user of hard drugs, Fats had a very unhealthy diet.

== Band reunion ==
Around 2002, the remaining original members of the Hollywood Fats Band were reunited with young Kirk Fletcher on guitar, and recorded some new material. The first of the recordings came out on Al Blake's solo album Dr. Blake's Magic Soul Elixir released in 2002. This new version of the band started calling themselves the "Hollywood Blue Flames". They have released three albums under their new name for Delta Groove Productions. Their first album in 2005 was called Soul Sanctuary. The second album Road To Rio comes with a bonus CD titled Larger Than Life which consists of previously unreleased live recordings of the original Hollywood Fats Band. The third album Deep In America also has a bonus CD titled Larger Than Life, Vol. 2 which consists of more previously unreleased live recordings of the original band.

== Discography ==
| Year | Title | Label | Remarks |
|---|---|---|---|
| 1979 | Hollywood Fats Band | PBR International PBR-7008 | The original release |
| 1993 | Rock This House | Black Top BT-1097; AIM (Australia) 1035 | Re-issue of the 1979 album |
| 2002 | Hollywood Fats Band | CrossCut (Germany) 11069 [2CD] | The complete 1979 sessions/recordings (including a bonus disc of previously unreleased material and alternate takes) |
| 2006 | Road To Rio (w/bonus disc: Larger Than Life) | Delta Groove Productions DGP-107 [2CD] | Previously unissued live recordings (on the bonus disc) |
| 2008 | Hollywood Fats & The Paladins: Live 1985 | Top Cat Records TCT-6082 | Recorded live at the Greenville Bar & Grill, Dallas TX - December 1985 |
| 2010 | Deep In America (w/bonus disc: Larger Than Life, Vol. 2) | Delta Groove Productions DGP-136 [2CD] | Previously unissued live recordings (on the bonus disc) |
| 2019 | Hollywood Fats Band- Blues By The Pound, Volume 1 (Recorded Live 1979-1980) | Top Cat Records TCT-1192 | Previously unissued live recordings ("Treasures From The Lost Shoebox") |
| 2019 | The Blasters- Dark Night: Live in Philly | Rockbeat ROC-3428 (LP); Liberation Hall LIB-5000 (CD) | Recorded live at the Chestnut Cabaret, Philadelphia, PA - July 1986 |
| 20?? | Dino's Revenge- Live At Madame Wong's 1986 | Falco Productions | Recorded live at Madame Wong's West, Santa Monica, CA - November 1986 |

With John Lee Hooker

- Free Beer and Chicken (ABC, 1974)
