= Shawn Pittman (musician) =

American blues rock singer and multi-instrumentalist (born 1974)

- Born: Shawn James Pittman; October 13, 1974 (age 51); Talihina, Oklahoma, U.S.
- Genres: Blues rock
- Occupations: Singer, multi-instrumentalist, songwriter, record producer
- Instruments: Vocals, guitar, piano, harmonica, drums etc.
- Years active: 1993–present
- Website: Official website

Shawn James Pittman (born October 13, 1974) is an American blues rock singer, multi-instrumentalist, songwriter, and record producer. In his career, he has worked with musicians from Double Trouble, plus James Cotton, Matt "Guitar" Murphy, Hubert Sumlin, Kim Wilson, Lou Ann Barton, Gary Clark Jr., and Susan Tedeschi. Commencing recording in the late 1990s, Pittman been involved in the release of 17 albums.

== Early life and education ==
Shawn Pittman was born in Talihina, Oklahoma, U.S. He grew up in Noble, a small town in Cleveland County, Oklahoma. His earliest remembrances of music was a combination of hearing his grandmother playing boogie-woogie piano and his father's collection of Buddy Holly and Chuck Berry recordings. At eight years old his mother sent him for piano lessons, but he never liked learning to play. His elder brother's drum kit held more fascination for Pittman, before he progressed in his early teens to playing the guitar. A schoolfriend, Braken Hale, introduced Pittman to records made by Lightnin' Hopkins and Muddy Waters. In later life, Hale collaborated with Pittman on writing material.

Pittman's love of listening to the radio gave him access to work by Jimmy Reed, Elmore James, John Lee Hooker, Jimmie Vaughan, Johnny "Guitar" Watson, Buddy Guy, Albert King, and Hound Dog Taylor. Pittman decided his immediate future lay in Texas and, by the age of 17, had relocated to Dallas to live with his in-laws. His final year of education took place at the Booker T. Washington High School for the Performing and Visual Arts. However, his schooling was not progressing satisfactorily and Pittman's uncle transported him to attend live blues performances. Schooners, a club in Dallas, became a favored venue and Pittman introduced himself to regular musicians including Sam Myers, Brian "Hash Brown" Calway, Pat Boyack, Anson Funderburgh, Mike Morgan, Tutu Jones, and Andrew "Jr. Boy" Jones. As Pittman grew more confident of his guitar playing, he initially worked alongside musicians such as Cricket Taylor, Cold Blue Steel, Lou Hampton, the Bramhall Brothers, and Mike Morgan. Another combination that Pittman worked within was eventually known as the Holy Moellers, and had Jay Moeller playing drums, prior to his decade-long tenure with the Fabulous Thunderbirds.

== Career ==
Pittman commenced as a professional musician in January 1993.

In 1996, Pittman self recorded his debut album, which was originally called Blues From Dallas Texas. Recorded in that city and costing $3000; Ron Levy had just started up Cannonball Records, and bought the master for $5000. Pittman was able to repay his debts and Cannonball released the recording, now billed as Burnin' Up, in April 1998. The same year Pittman appeared at the Chicago Blues Festival. The Jim Gaines-produced, Something's Gotta Give, followed in 1999, also on Cannonball Records. The same year Pittman opened several concerts for Susan Tedeschi, before playing rhythm guitar in her backing band for a short spell. This time included a spot on Late Night with Conan O'Brien. In mid-1999, Pittman relocated to Austin, Texas. This coincided with a two-year period where Pittman had personal and professional problems, exasperated with the closing of Cannonball Records. He put together another ensemble, which assisted in the recording of his next album. Two bass players, Tommy Shannon and Preston Hubbard, plus the Moeller brothers Jay and Johnny played on the self-released, Full Circle (2001), which was also produced by Jim Gaines. The album comprised mostly self-penned material by Pittman, plus several covers, such as a version of Bob Dylan's "It Takes a Lot to Laugh, It Takes a Train to Cry".

Another album Pittman released was Stay (2004), before he took a lengthy break from music. Rejuvenated, he issued his fifth release, Meridian, in February 2009 and opened for B.B. King at the House of Blues in Houston for two nights. Pittman then stated, "One day I think I am done with music and the next thing I know I'm back and opening for B.B. King!" That year saw Pittman perform over 250 shows. This flurry of activity saw several albums released in quick succession, leading to a new recording contract with Delta Groove Productions. This resulted in a totally different approach being used in the recording of his next collection, Edge of the World. Aiming to recreate the vintage tones and style of blues recordings from the 1950s and 1960s, Pittman supplied virtually all of the voices and instrumentation on the recording. Apart from Jonathan Doyle playing the saxophone parts, Pittman recorded his own efforts on vocals, guitar, piano, bass and drums, and was the sound engineer and co-record producer. In addition, Pittman wrote most of the material although he had a co-writer in his friend, non-musician and former trial lawyer, Lewis Dickson. Edge of the World was recorded in Pittman's home studio in Kyle, Texas, and released in 2011.

However, in August 2011, via a post on Facebook, Pitman stated he intended to leave the music industry. In 2013, Pittman relocated to Tulsa, Oklahoma, and while taking time away from music completed a degree in information technology.

A low-key, download only release, saw his musical comeback with Backslidin' Again (2015). In early 2018, Pittman commenced recording what became his 12th album, Everybody Wants To Know. It was recorded in conjunction with his friend and drummer Jay Moeller, and issued by CrossCut Records late that year. Pittman performed at the Copenhagen Blues Festival in October 2019; the latest in a total of over 30 visits to Europe to play over the years. Pittman released his next album, Make It Right!, in April 2020 on the Dutch label Continental Blue Heaven.

== Discography ==
=== Albums ===
Year	Title	Record label(s)
1996	Blues From Dallas Texas	Midwest Records
1998	Burnin' Up'	Cannonball Records
1999	Something's Gotta Give	Cannonball Records
2001	Full Circle	Self-released
2004	Stay	Self-released
2009	Meridian	Self-released
2009	Movin' & Groovin'	Feelin' Good Records
2010	Too Hot	Feelin' Good Records
2010	Triple Troubles (with the Moeller Bros.)	Feelin' Good Records
2011	Edge of the World	Delta Groove Productions
2015	Backslidin' Again	Self-released
2016	Undeniable	Self-released
2018	Everybody Wants To Know (with Jay Moeller)	CrossCut Records
2020	Make It Right!	Continental Blue Heaven
2021	Stompin' Solo	Must Have Music
2022	Hard Road	Must Have Music
2025	My Journey	Must Have Music
