= Henry Gray (musician) =

American blues piano player and singer (1925–2020)

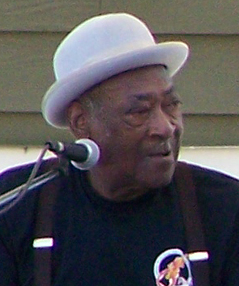
- Gray playing at the Festival International, Lafayette, Louisiana, spring 2010

Background information
- Born: January 19, 1925; Kenner, Louisiana, U.S.
- Died: February 17, 2020 (aged 95) Baton Rouge, Louisiana, U.S.
- Genres: Blues
- Instruments: Blues piano, singer
- Years active: 1930s–2019

Henry Gray (January 19, 1925 – February 17, 2020) was an American blues piano player and singer born in Kenner, Louisiana. He played for more than seven decades and performed with many artists, including Robert Lockwood Jr., Billy Boy Arnold, Morris Pejoe, the Rolling Stones, Muddy Waters, and Howlin' Wolf. He has more than 58 albums to his credit, including recordings for Chess Records. He is credited as helping to create the distinctive sound of the Chicago blues piano.

In 2017, Gray was inducted in to the Blues Hall of Fame.

== Early life and education ==
Shortly after he was born, Gray, an only child, moved with his parents to a farm in Alsen, Louisiana, a few miles north of Baton Rouge, where he lived during his childhood. He began studying the piano at the age of eight, taking lessons from a neighborhood woman, Mrs. White. Gray also credits the radio and music records in his home for inspiring his love of music at an early age. A few years later, he began playing piano and organ at the local Baptist church, and his family eventually acquired a piano for the house. Playing the blues was not encouraged in his family, but Henry played blues at Mrs. White's house, and by the time he was 16 he was playing blues at a club in Alsen. His father initially disapproved of the job but became supportive after seeing how much money his son was making.

In 1943, during World War II, Gray joined the United States Army and was sent to the South Pacific. While in the Army, he would frequently entertain other soldiers by playing the piano and singing. Shortly before the war was over, Gray was given a medical discharge from the army. He returned to the United States in 1946 and spent a brief time in Alsen before relocating to Chicago, where he had relatives, including a new baby sister, Annette, born in 1951.

== Career ==
=== Chicago: 1946–1968 ===
After arriving in Chicago, Gray began spending a great deal of his time in the growing postwar jazz and blues club scene. He would spend hours listening to and trying to learn from the city's best piano players and would occasionally get hired for smaller gigs. One day while he was sitting in at a club, he caught the attention of Big Maceo Merriweather, an important jazz and blues piano player in Chicago (from Detroit). Merriweather befriended Gray and had an important influence on Gray's "two-fisted playing". He also introduced Gray to several notable bands and club owners. As a result, Gray obtained steady gigs with groups like Little Hudson's Red Devil Trio (Hudson Showers) and the guitarist Morris Pejoe before moving into extensive work as a session musician in the recording studio accompanying Jimmy Reed, Bo Diddley, Billy Boy Arnold, Pejoe, and others. His first recording session was in 1952 with Jimmy Rogers. Gray also worked occasionally with Little Walter, who nicknamed the young pianist "Bird Breast".

In 1956, Gray joined Howlin' Wolf's band and was Wolf's main piano player for twelve years in performance and on recordings. Also during this time, Gray became a session player for numerous artists on recordings made by Chess Records. He recorded with many leading figures of the blues, including Dusty Brown, Sonny Boy Williamson II, Homesick James, Robert Lockwood, Jr., Billy Boy Arnold, Muddy Waters, Johnny Shines, Hubert Sumlin, Lazy Lester, Little Walter Jacobs, Otis Rush, Buddy Guy, James Cotton, Little Milton Campbell, Jimmy Rogers, Jimmy Reed, and Koko Taylor. Gray also made some recordings on other labels during the 1950s and 1960s, including several with J. D. "Jay" Miller's Louisiana Excello blues band. In 1963, Gray performed with Elmore James on the night that James died of a heart attack.

=== Louisiana: 1968–2019 ===
Gray left Wolf's band in 1968 and returned to Alsen, Louisiana, due to the death of his father and to assist his mother with the family business, a fish market. Gray became an important part of Louisiana's music scene. His big, rollicking sound became part of the region's "swamp blues" style. In addition to performing, Gray worked with the East Baton Rouge Parish School Board as a roofer from 1968 to 1983. In the mid-1980s he recorded a series of singles for the Sunland label, some with the harmonica player Whispering Smith, which are amongst the last great traditional blues 45-rpm records.

From the mid-1980s to 2019, Gray performed at virtually all of the New Orleans Jazz & Heritage Festivals, three Chicago Blues Festivals (1987, 1989, and 2005), the Montreal Jazz Festival (1988), nearly every Baton Rouge Blues Festival since its inception, the San Francisco Blues Festival, Memphis's W.C. Handy Blues Festival, several times at Festival International (Lafayette, Louisiana), the Mississippi Valley Blues Festival (Davenport, Iowa), the King Biscuit Blues Festival (Helena, Arkansas), and many other festivals around the United States.

Gray traveled to Europe frequently to play at festivals and in concerts and can be heard on several European releases. In 1988, Blind Pig Records released Gray's first stateside feature LP, Lucky Man. The album was produced by the guitarist Steve Freund, who also joined Gray on the album for a combination of both Chicago blues and bayou boogie. In 1990, Gray recorded the album Louisiana Swamp Blues for Wolf Records. In 1998 he played for Mick Jagger's 55th birthday celebration in Paris. In the summer of 1999, Gray toured Europe with Marva Wright and her band, giving concerts of "Louisiana music" under the sponsorship of Blue House Records. In 2001, Gray recorded two albums: Watch Yourself, for the Lucky Cat label, and Henry Gray Plays Chicago Blues, for Hightone Records. In 2003, Henry Gray & the Cats released a CD and DVD entitled Henry Gray & the Cats: Live in Paris. Also in 2003, Gray was featured along with Ray Charles, Dr. John, Pinetop Perkins and Dave Brubeck in Clint Eastwood's film Blues Piano, a part of Martin Scorsese's seven-part series The Blues, which was aired on public television in the United States. In 2006, Gray was featured along with Jerry Lee Lewis, Pinetop Perkins, Marcia Ball and Little Red in a concert at Morgan Freeman's club Ground Zero in Clarksdale, Mississippi, which was recorded for the DVD Falsifyin', produced and released by SunLion Films. That same year, Gray starred in the independent film The Glass Chord as Saul Solomon, an aging musician with Alzheimer's disease.

Gray also continued to tour as a soloist and with his band Henry Gray and the Cats. He appeared in the 2015 documentary film I Am the Blues. In June 2017, Gray went into Dockside Studio with his great grandson DeAndre Tate and The Creole Cats band (Paul "Lil' Buck" Sinegal, Danny Williams, Stan Chambers, and Oreun Joubert) to record 92, aptly titled after his age. 92 was produced by Terrance Simien, Cynthia Simien, and Tate, and was engineered by Justin Tocket and mixed/mastered by DF Audio (David Farrell).

== Personal life ==
Gray suffered from alcoholism, but was sober for many years during his later life.

In 1989, his home in the Baton Rouge area was destroyed by a tornado.

He was married to Rivers Gray. Together they had three children and eight grandchildren.

Following surgery for a collapsed lung, Gray experienced a mild heart attack on February 20, 2017, at age 92. Despite this double health scare, Henry Gray continued playing the blues. On October 10, 2019, it was confirmed by Gray's family that he had entered hospice care in Baton Rouge. Gray died at the age of 95 on February 17, 2020.

== Awards and honors ==
In 1998, Gray was nominated for a Grammy Award for Best Traditional Blues Album for A Tribute to Howlin' Wolf, released by Telarc Records.

Between 2002 and 2017, Gray was nominated for six Blues Music Awards (formerly the W.C. Handy Blues Awards) in various categories, including Traditional Blues Male Artist and Traditional Blues Album (both in 2002).

Gray was a recipient of the 2006 National Heritage Fellowship by the National Endowment for the Arts, the nation's top honor for folk artists.

In 2016, Blues Blast Magazine honored Gray with a Lifetime Achievement Award.

In 2017, Gray was inducted in to the Blues Hall of Fame.

== Selected discography ==
- Louisiana Swamp Blues, Vol. 2, 1990 (Wolf Records)
- Don't Start That Stuff, 1996 (Last Call Records)
- Blues Won't Let Me Take My Rest, 1999 (Lucky Cat Records)
- Henry Gray Plays Chicago Blues, 2001 (Hightone Records)
- Watch Yourself, featuring Lil' Buck Sinegal, 2001 (Lucky Cat Records)
- Henry Gray and the Cats: Live in Paris, CD/DVD, 2003 (Lucky Cat Records)
- The Blues of Henry Gray & Cousin Joe, 2004 (Storyville Records)
- Times Are Gettin Hard, 2009 (Lucky Cat Productions)
- 92, 2017 (MusicMatters Records)

With Howlin' Wolf

- More Real Folk Blues (Chess, 1953-56 [1967])
