= Rod Piazza =

American blues musician

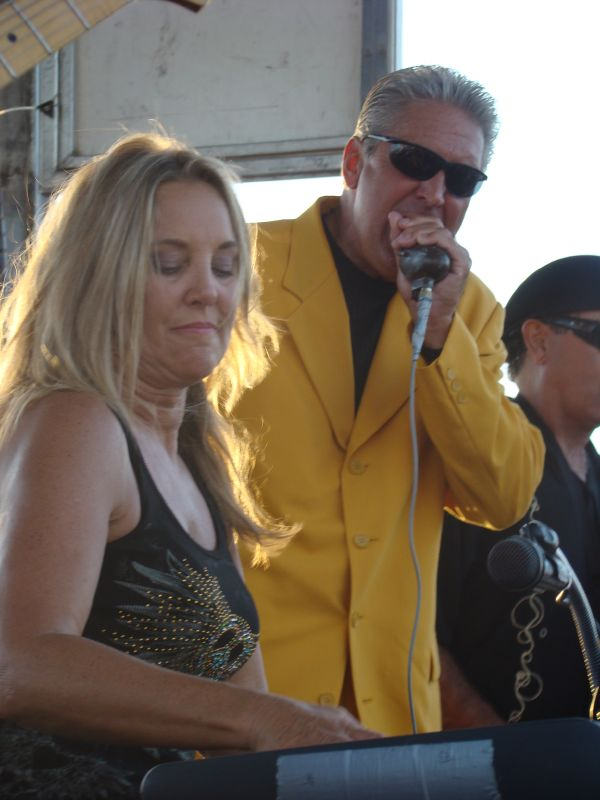
- Rod Piazza with Honey at the Legendary Rhythm & Blues Cruise, 2007

Background information
- Born: December 18, 1947 (age 78); Riverside, California, United States
- Genres: Blues
- Instruments: Harmonica, vocals
- Years active: 1967–present
- Labels: ABC-Bluesway, Murray Brothers, Black Top, Tone-Cool, Delta Groove
- Website: The Mighty Flyers' website

Rod Piazza (born December 18, 1947, Riverside, California) is an American blues harmonica player and singer. He has been playing with his band The Mighty Flyers, which he formed with his pianist wife Honey Piazza, since 1980. Their boogie sound combines the styles of jump blues, West Coast blues and Chicago blues.

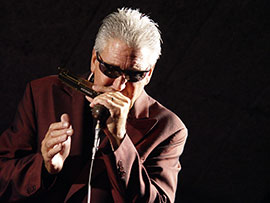
Rod Piazza.

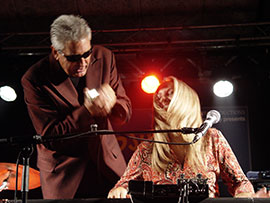
Rod and Honey Piazza.

== Biography ==
Piazza grew up in Southern California, where he studied blues records and perfected his harmonica work. He originally started on guitar, an instrument he began playing at the age of six or seven.

In the mid-1960s, Piazza formed his first band The House of DBS, which later changed its name to the Dirty Blues Band. The band signed with ABC-Bluesway and released two albums in 1967 and 1968. The band broke up in 1968, and Piazza formed Bacon Fat that year. Piazza's idol and mentor, George "Harmonica" Smith joined the band and they had a "dual harp" sound. Bacon Fat released two albums the following two years. Piazza left and worked in other bands before going solo in 1974.

He formed the Chicago Flying Saucer Band the following year, which later evolved into the Mighty Flyers. The band recorded their first album in 1980. Piazza started touring and recording as Rod Piazza and the Mighty Flyers Blues Quartet, after the departure of long-time bassist Bill Stuve in the early 2000s. Piazza has recorded twenty-four studio albums between 1967 and 2009, including the live concert DVD Big Blues Party in 2005 (recorded at the Sierra Nevada Brewing Company in Chico, California). In addition, he has appeared as a guest performer on over twenty-one releases since 1968. Between 1995 and 2001, Rick Holmstrom played in the Mighty Flyers.

Piazza has toured blues clubs, concert venues and festivals in the United States, Canada, United Kingdom, Germany, Japan and Spain, among other countries. He and his wife currently live in Riverside, California.

== Discography ==
=== Pre-Mighty Flyers Era ===
- 1967 The Dirty Blues Band: The Dirty Blues Band (ABC-Bluesway)
- 1968 The Dirty Blues Band: Stone Dirt (ABC-Bluesway)
- 1969 Live At Small's Paradise (Blue Moon [UK], issued in 1986) - Bacon Fat with Rod Piazza, George "Harmonica" Smith, Pee Wee Crayton, J.D. Nicholson, Buddy Reed, Jerry Smith, Richard Innes
- 1970 Bacon Fat: Grease One For Me (Blue Horizon)
- 1971 Bacon Fat: Tough Dude (Blue Horizon)
- 1973 Rod Piazza: Blues Man (LMI)
- 1979 The Chicago Flying Saucer Band Featuring Rod Piazza (Gangster)

=== With The Mighty Flyers ===
- 1981 Radioactive Material (Right Hemisphere)
- 1984 File Under Rock (Takoma)
- 1985 From The Start To The Finnish (Red Lightnin'; US release in 1986 on Pausa)
- 1986 Harpburn (Murray Brothers; reissued in 1993 on Black Top; Rod Piazza solo album)
- 1988 So Glad To Have The Blues (Murray Brothers; Special Delivery; Rod Piazza solo album)
- 1988 Undercover (Special Delivery)
- 1991 Blues In The Dark (Black Top)
- 1992 Alphabet Blues (Black Top)
- 1994 Live At B.B. King's Blues Club (Big Mo)
- 1997 Tough And Tender (Tone-Cool)
- 1998 Vintage Live 1975 (Tone-Cool) with Hollywood Fats
- 1999 Here And Now (Tone-Cool)
- 2001 Beyond The Source (Tone-Cool)
- 2004 Keepin' It Real (Blind Pig)
- 2005 Big Blues Party (Blind Pig) [DVD]
- 2005 For The Chosen Who (Delta Groove) [CD+DVD]
- 2007 Thrill Ville (Delta Groove)
- 2009 Soul Monster (Delta Groove)
- 2011 Almighty Dollar (Delta Groove)
- 2014 Emergency Situation (Blind Pig)
- 2017 Live At Fleetwood's (Big Mo) [2CD] - recorded 1993

=== Selected collections ===
- 1970 How Blue Can We Get? (Blue Horizon)
- 1991 Blues Cocktail Party! (Black Top)
- 1992 Blues Pajama Party (Black Top)
- 1992 The Essential Collection (Hightone) - compilation of Radioactive Material, File Under Rock, and From The Start To The Finnish.
- 1992 Blues Harmonica Spotlight (Black Top)
- 1995 Blues, Mistletoe & Santa's Little Helper (Black Top)
- 1996 Instrumental Blues Dynamite! (Black Top)
- 1997 California Blues (Black Top) - compilation of Harpburn, Blues In The Dark and Alphabet Blues.
- 1997 Jump & Swing with Black Top (Black Top)
- 1997 Blues Harp Power (Easydisc/Rounder)
- 1997 Blues After Hours (Easydisc/Rounder)
- 1998 Blues Joint (Easydisc/Rounder)
- 1998 Blues Harp Hotshots (Easydisc/Rounder)
- 2003 The Story of Tone-Cool, vol. 1 (Tone-Cool) [2CD]
- 2003 Live at the W.C. Handy Blues Awards, vol. 1 (Tone-Cool)
- 2003 Modern Master: The Best of Rod Piazza 1968-2003 (Tone-Cool) [2CD]
- 2006 Blues Party (Tone-Cool)
- 2008 His Instrumentals (Piazza Publishing; reissued in 2018 on Rip Cat Records) [2CD]
