= Smokin' Joe Kubek =

American blues guitarist and songwriter

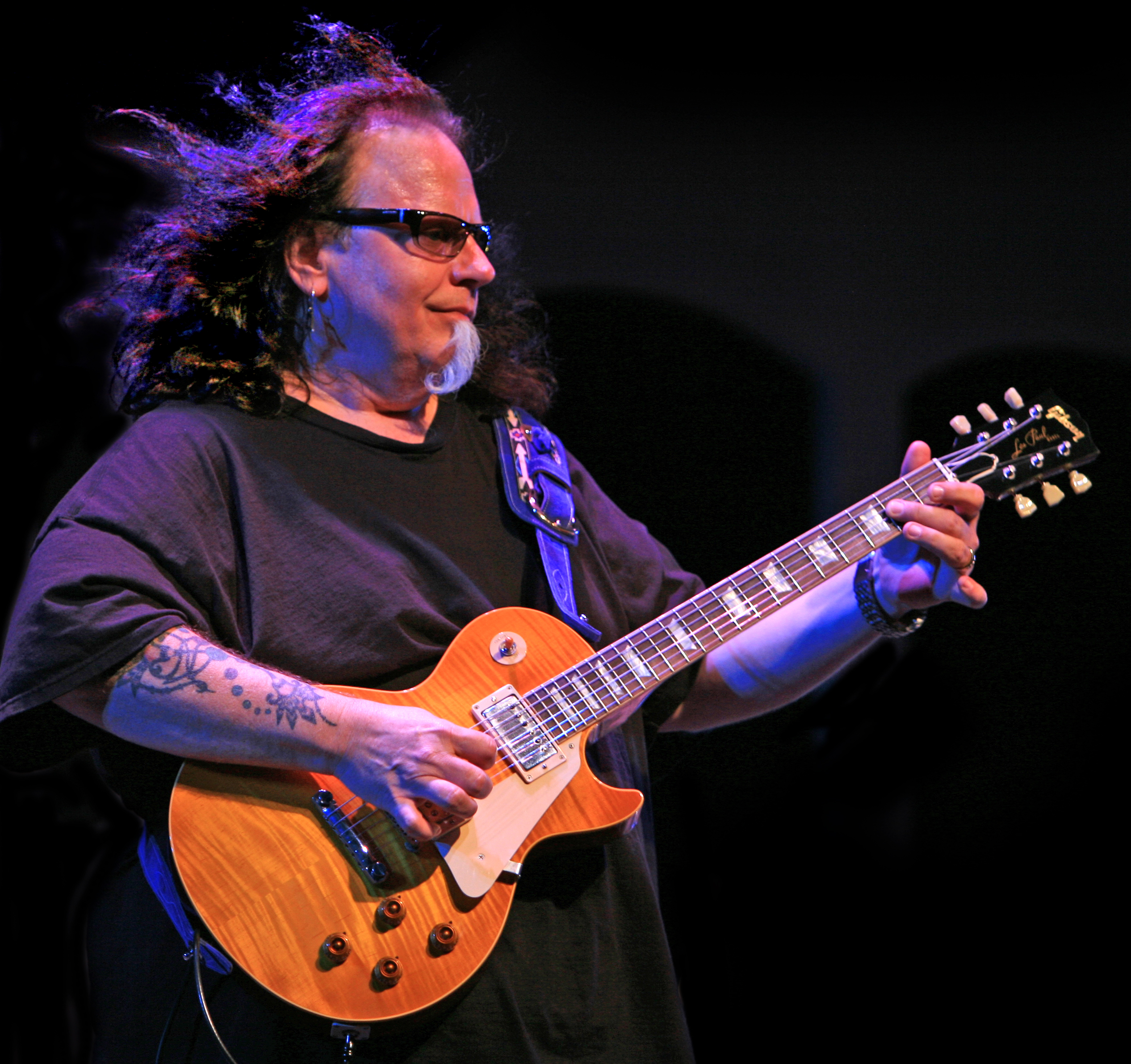
Joe Kubek 2006

Smokin' Joe Kubek (November 30, 1956 – October 11, 2015) was an American Texas blues electric guitarist, songwriter and performer.

== Biography ==
Born in Grove City, Pennsylvania, Kubek grew up in the Dallas, Texas area. In the 1970s during his teen years, he played with the likes of Freddie King and in the 1980s began performing with Louisiana-born musician and vocalist, Bnois King.

In 1985, Kubek released his first record on Bird Records, a 45 RPM single with the tracks "Driving Sideways" (written by Freddie King and Sonny Thompson) and "Other Side of Love" (written by Doyle Bramhall Sr.). The single's executive producers were Clint Birdwell and Charley Wirz. The two tracks reappeared on Kubek's 2012 album, Let That Right Hand Go, produced by Birdwell and issued on Birdwell's label, Bird Records Texas. The album is a collection of mostly unreleased material recorded since the 1980s (with the 1985 single's track, "Other Side of Love", entitled "The Other Side of Love").

In 1991, Kubek released his first full-length album, entitled Steppin' Out Texas Style (Bullseye Blues Records), and later released over a dozen albums on various labels.

Kubek died on October 11, 2015, from a heart attack at the age of 58.

== Discography ==
=== Singles ===
- 1985: "Driving Sideways" (2:44) / "Other Side of Love" (4:22) (Bird Records)

=== Albums ===
- 1991: The Axe Man (Double Trouble Records)
- 1991: Steppin' Out Texas Style (Bullseye Blues Records)
- 1992: Chain Smokin' Texas Style (Bullseye Blues Records)
- 1993: Texas Cadillac (Bullseye Blues Records)
- 1995: Cryin' For The Moon (Bullseye Blues Records)
- 1996: Keep Comin' Back (Bullseye Blues Records)
- 1996: Got My Mind Back (Bullseye Blues Records)
- 1998: Take Your Best Shot (Bullseye Blues Records)
- 2000: Bite Me! (Bullseye Blues Records)
- 2003: Roadhouse Research (Blind Pig Records)
- 2004: Show Me The Money (Blind Pig Records)
- 2005: Served Up Texas Style (Bullseye Blues Records)
- 2006: My Heart's In Texas (Blind Pig Records)
- 2008: Blood Brothers (Alligator Records)
- 2010: Have Blues Will Travel (Alligator Records)
- 2012: Let That Right Hand Go... (Bird Records Texas)
- 2012: Close To The Bone (Delta Groove Productions)
- 2013: Road Dog's Life (Delta Groove)
- 2015: Fat Man's Shine Parlor (Blind Pig Records)
