= Bnois King =

American blues and jazz musician

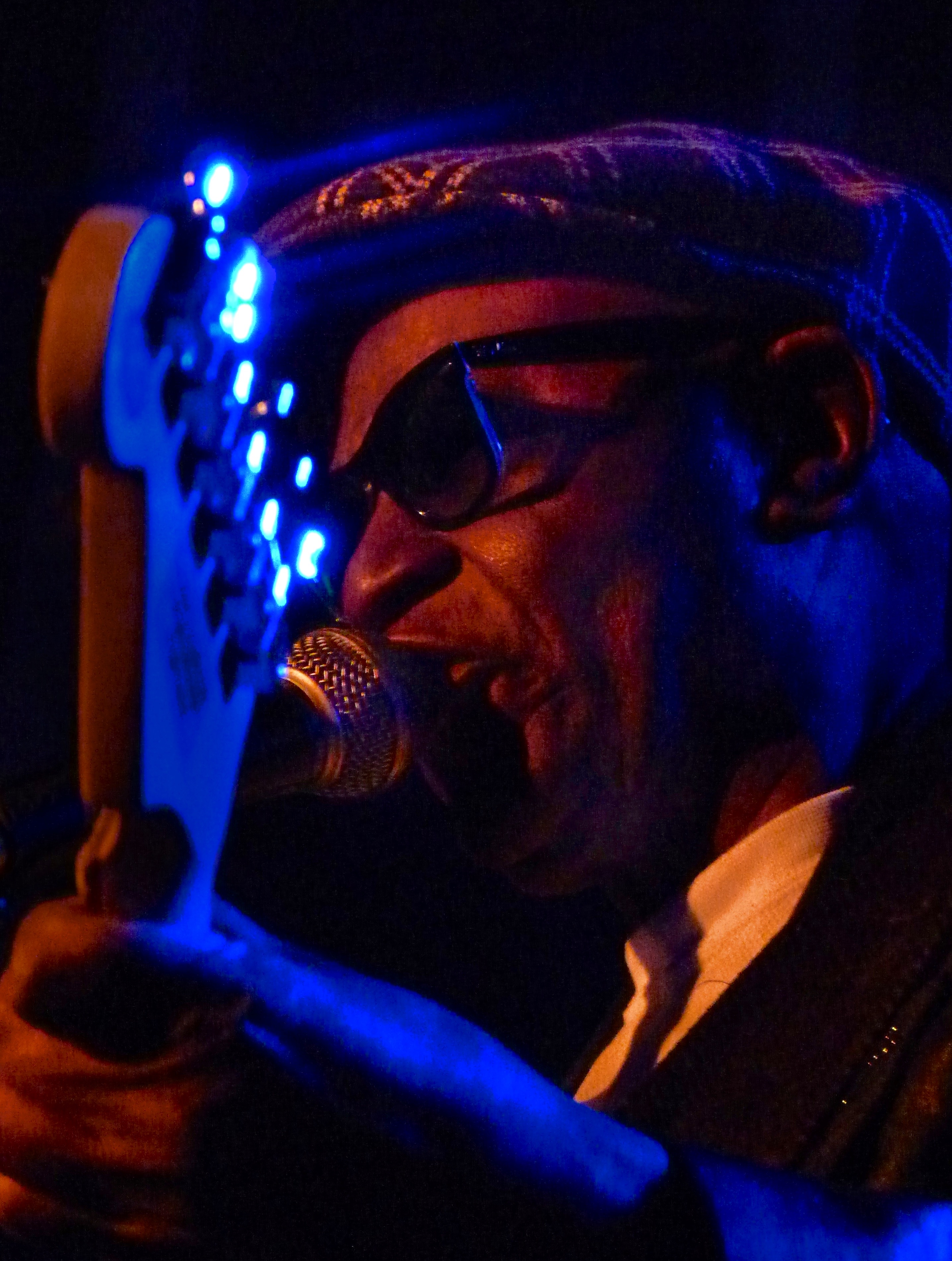
- Bnois King in Kwadendamme, the Netherlands (2013)

Background information
- Born: January 21, 1943 (age 83); Delhi, Louisiana
- Genres: Jazz, Blues, Texas blues
- Occupations: blues guitarist, vocalist, composer
- Instrument: Guitar
- Years active: 1951–present
- Labels: Rounder Records, Blind Pig, Delta Groove Music, Alligator Records

Bnois King (born January 21, 1943) (pronounced "buh-noise") is a Texas Blues and Jazz guitar player, vocalist, and composer. He most often played guitar and rhythm guitar, and acted as the main vocalist and original song writer for the Smokin' Joe Kubek Band, touring and equally billed with Kubek after 1997.

== Early life and career ==
King was born January 21, 1943, in Delhi, Louisiana, a small town thirty miles east of Monroe, Louisiana. He had seven brothers and two sisters. King started playing guitar at the early age of eight when he found an unused guitar in his grandmother's closet and started picking out notes. He attended Boley High School, which lacked a music teacher until his final year there. Up until then, the few songs he could play he played by ear. While still in high school, James Moody, the owner and bandleader of a 20-piece big band out of New Orleans (called "The New Sounds"), took him under his wing and gave him his first paying gig, for which King made $15. Once King realized he could make money playing guitar on stage is when he reports "...I really got serious" about playing guitar."

"...the first gig I ever played... paid me $15 [for the night]. At the time I was working on a milk truck. I had to get up at 2 o'clock in the morning to deliver milk and that was only paying $15 a week! So I said 'Hey! What's wrong with this picture?' All I was doing was holding my guitar and I got a whole weeks pay. I knew right then I wasn't going to run behind a milk truck getting chased by dogs any more..." —Bnois King

After high school, King traveled to west Texas (Amarillo), Colorado and Oklahoma, and finally settled in north Texas (Wichita Falls) while trying to break into the music industry and make a career from it. Struggling at first in the industry, King sometimes found himself playing at carnival side shows or working 'straight jobs' (such as detailing cars at a dealership). King was, however, again performing regularly in Dallas and Fort Worth by the late 70s, usually playing with jazz bands. playing with Big Joe Williams along with other local talent, often out of a local Dallas blues spot, Poor David's Pub.

It was in Dallas that King met, and thereafter periodically teamed up with, electric blues guitarist Smokin' Joe Kubek, starting in 1989.

== Playing style ==
King was exposed to gospel music at an early age, but leaned more towards the blues and (especially) jazz, which he listened to on the radio while growing up. He started playing blues covers when still in high school, but continued mostly playing with jazz oriented bands afterward—until he met Kubek. While the rock-influenced Kubek played in an aggressive style, King had been heavily jazz-influenced and embraced a more relaxed playing style. They got along well, however, and two repeatedly partnered up after 1989. Other blues artists, such as Sam Myers would sit in with the group for performances.

== Career work with Kubek ==
Building a repertoire from old, neglected blues genre songs (such as from the likes of Jimmy Reed and Freddie King), the duo found a ready audience for Bnois King's laid-back vocalizations and rhythm guitar playing, and Kubek's hard-playing blues style. At this time, King discovered other talents he didn't realize he possessed: singing and song writing. King hadn't really sung much on stage until he teamed up with Kubek. King said about it: "We needed a singer so I sang... and every time I did the crowds went wild. We needed songs so I wrote about things that happened to me, to people I knew..." Audiences enjoyed the blending of the two's very different playing styles.

"We're not blues purists. We know that. We can't play pure blues. We can't. There's just too much stuff mixed in me and Joe's got too much stuff mixed in him. We're not pure anything." —Bnois King

The duo released their first collaborative album in 1991, a Texas blues album entitled Steppin' Out Texas Style. The duo's run came to an end October 2015 with Kubek's death.

=== Production companies ===
King and Kubek originally signed up with Rounder Select-Bullseye when they published their first joint album in 1991. That relationship worked until the late 1990s, when King started receiving equal billing with Kubek after 1997. The two were signed with Blind Pig Records from 2002 to 2007; and again in 2015. In addition, King has been signed and promoted (as both a solo act and as a duo along with Kubek) to Alligator Records, Delta Groove, and Simitar Records for various past productions.

== Album discography ==
=== Solo efforts and contributions ===
- The Mardi Gras Indians Super Sunday Showdown (1992), background vocals
- Slidin'...Some Slide (1993); primary artist
- Global Celebration (Authentic Music from Festivals & Celebrations Around the World) (1993), background vocals
- Direct Hits from Bullseye Blue (1993), primary artist
- Blues Across the U.S.A. (1993), primary artist, composer, vocals
- Roundup Records CD Sampler, Summer 1994 (1994), guitar, vocals
- New Blues Classics (1994); primary artist, vocals
- The Real Music Box: 25 Years of Rounder Records (1995), primary artist
- Louisiana Spice (1995), vocals
- Deep Blue: 25 Years of Blues on Rounder Records (1995), primary artist
- Bullseye Blues Christmas (2005), primary artist, vocals
- Blues Guitar Greats [Easydisc] (2006), primary artist
- Texas Blues Party (1997), composer, guitar, primary artist
- New Blues Hits (1997), arranger, composer, guitar, vocals
- Blues Cruise: Ten for the Highway (1997), guitar and rhythm guitar, composer, primary artist
- Blues Next-The New Generation (March 1998), Simitar (solo and also with The Smokin' Joe Kubek Band)
- Mardi Gras in New Orleans [Rounder] (2001), vocals
- Get the Blues, Vol. 2 (2003), primary artist, composer
- Box of the Blues (2003), primary artist, composer, rhythm guitar
- Blind Pig Records 30th Anniversary Collection (2006), composer
- City of Dreams: A Collection of New Orleans Music (2007), background vocalist
- Alligator Records 40th Anniversary Collection (2011), primary artist
- A Blues Tribute to Creedence Clearwater Revival (2014), guitar, primary artist, vocalist

=== The Smokin' Joe Kubek Band, featuring Bnois King ===
- Steppin' Out Texas Style (1991), Rounder Select-Bullseye
- Chain Smokin' Texas Style (1992),
- Texas Cadillac (1994), Bullseye Blues/Rounder
- Cryin' for the Moon (1995), Bullseye Blues/Rounder
- Got My Mind Back (1996), Rounder Select
- Lone Star Blues (October 1997), EasyDisc/Rounder
- Take Your Best Shot (1998), Rounder Select
- Bite Me! (2000), Bullseye Blues/Rounder
- Served Up Texas Style: The Best of the Smokin' Joe Kubek Band (2005), Bullseye Blues/Rounder

=== Compilations with Kubek ===
- Texas Blues Guitar (June 1997), EasyDisc/Rounder
- Blues Guitar Duels (August 1998), EasyDisc/Rounder
- New Blues Classics (2010), Bullseye Blues/Rounder

=== Duo albums with Smokin' Joe Kubek ===
- Axe Man (December 1991), Double Trouble Records
- Roadhouse Research (2003), Blind Pig
- Show Me The Money (2004), Blind Pig
- My Heart's In Texas (2006), Blind Pig; (live recording, from J&J Blues Bar, Ft. Worth, Texas)
- Blood Brothers (2008), Alligator Records
- Have Blues, Will Travel (2010), Alligator Records
- Close to the Bone: Unplugged (2011), Delta Groove Music / Delta Groove Productions / Jazzhaus
- Road Dog's Life (2013), Delta Groove Music / Delta Groove Productions / Jazzhaus
- Fat Man's Shine Parlor< (2015), Blind Pig
