= Living Blues =

American blues magazine

- Cover of the September 2025 issue (298)
- Editor: Brett Bonner
- Categories: Music, blues
- Frequency: Bi-monthly
- Circulation: 25,000
- Founded: 1970
- First issue: 1970
- Company: Center for the Study of Southern Culture
- Country: United States
- Based in: Oxford, Mississippi
- Website: www.livingblues.com
- ISSN: 0024-5232

Living Blues: The Magazine of the African American Blues Tradition is a bi-monthly magazine focused on blues music, and America's oldest blues periodical. The magazine was founded as a quarterly in Chicago in 1970 by Jim O'Neal and Amy van Singel as editors, and five others as writers. Among them were Bruce Iglauer and Paul Garon. They sold the first copies at the 1970 Ann Arbor Blues Festival.

In 1983, O'Neal and van Singel sold publication rights to the Center for the Study of Southern Culture at the University of Mississippi, and donated to the center their collection of blues records, photos, subject files, and memorabilia. At that time the magazine became a bi-monthly, with O'Neal still the editor. Peter Lee, who later founded Fat Possum Records, David Nelson, and Scott Barretta followed as editors. The headquarters of the magazine moved to Oxford, Mississippi. As of 2014, the magazine was edited by Brett Bonner.

The magazine stresses the position of blues as a living African American tradition. Each issue contains a variety of features, including artist interviews and profiles, record reviews, and a monthly Top 25 national blues radio chart. The annual Living Blues Awards have been presented since 1993 in multiple categories.

The blues singer Deitra Farr was a regular contributor.
