= Blues Music Awards =

Annual awards by the Blues Foundation since 1980

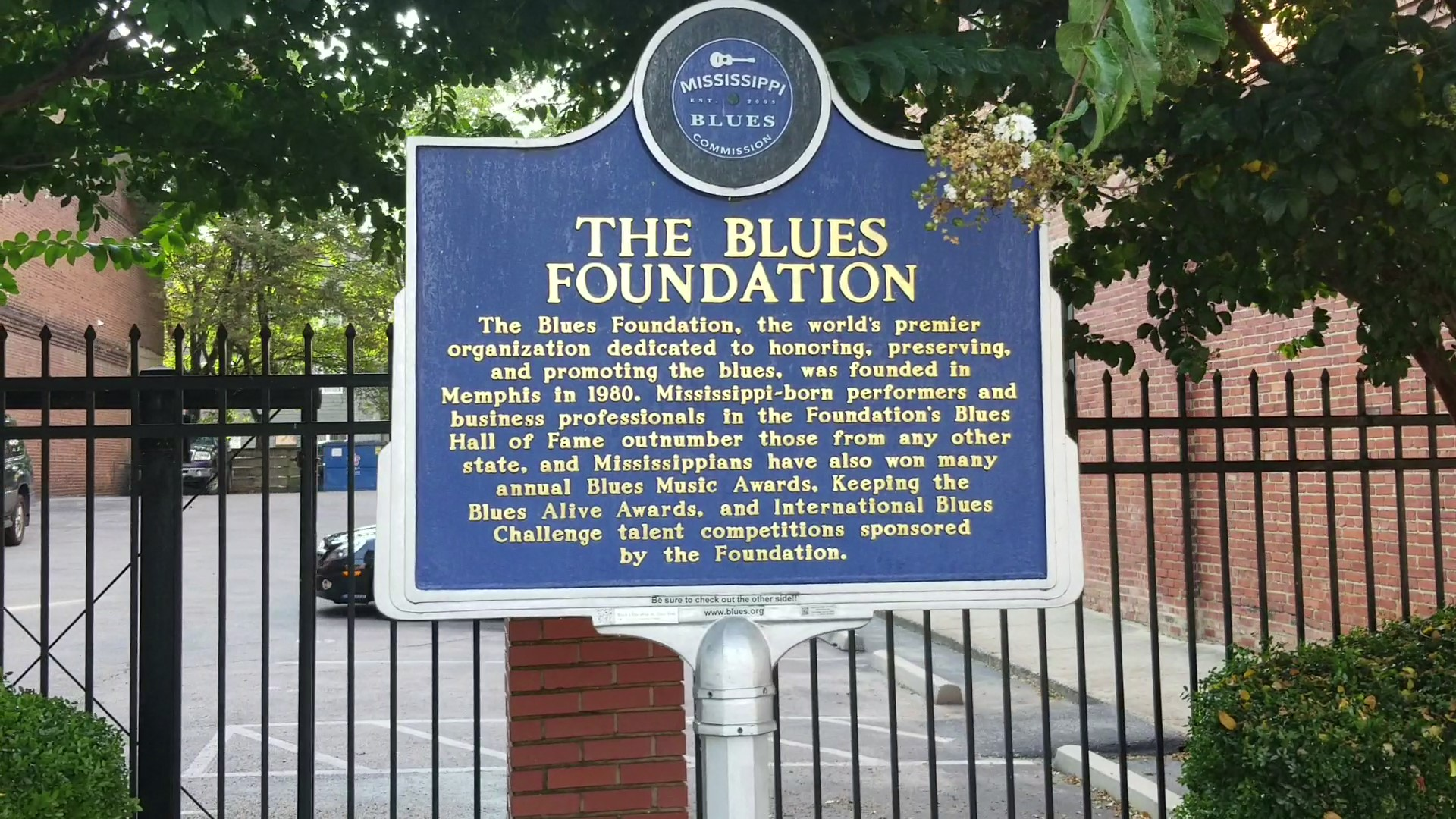
Blues Foundation Blues Trail Marker

The Blues Music Awards, formerly known as the W. C. Handy Awards (or "The Handys"), are awards presented by the Blues Foundation, a non-profit organization set up to foster blues heritage. The awards were originally named in honor of W. C. Handy, "Father of the Blues". The first award was presented in 1980 and is "universally recognized as the highest accolade afforded musicians and songwriters in blues music". In 2006, the awards were renamed Blues Music Awards in an effort to increase public appreciation of the significance of the awards.

They are presented annually in Memphis, Tennessee, where the Blues Foundation is located, although the 2008 award ceremony was held in Tunica, Mississippi. The 39th Blues Music Awards were held on May 10, 2018, at the Memphis Cook Convention Center. Two new award categories had been announced (Instrumentalist-Vocals and Blues Rock Artist of the Year) bringing the number of awards to be presented up to 26 in total. The 40th Blues Music Awards took place on May 9, 2019, with the Historical Album of the Year category being dropped, reducing the overall number of categories to 25.

The 41st ceremony was scheduled for May 7, 2020, but the live event was cancelled due to the COVID-19 pandemic. The 2020 winners were announced at a virtual event. The 42nd ceremony was again presented at a virtual event on June 6, 2021. The 43rd ceremony took place on May 5, 2022, as the first in-person event since 2019. The 44th event was held on May 11, 2023, in Memphis. The 45th event took place on May 8, 2024, in Memphis, with the 46th event held on May 9, 2025.

The 47th ceremony took place on May 7, 2026, in Memphis, with the addition of a new category (the 26th) – International Blues Album.

== 2026 ==
Category	Winner
Acoustic Album of the Year	Between Somewhere and Goodbye, Doug MacLeod
Acoustic Artist of the Year	Kevin Burt
Album of the Year	Talkin' Heavy, D.K. Harrell
B. B. King Entertainer of the Year	Ronnie Baker Brooks
Band of the Year	Tedeschi Trucks Band
Best Emerging Artist Album	Have Mercy! by Sean McDonald
Contemporary Blues Album of the Year	Talkin' Heavy, D.K. Harrell
Contemporary Blues Female Artist of the Year	Danielle Nicole
Contemporary Blues Male Artist of the Year	Christone "Kingfish" Ingram
Instrumentalist – Bass	Scot Sutherland
Instrumentalist – Drums	Derrick D'Mar Martin
Instrumentalist – Guitar	Derek Trucks
Instrumentalist – Harmonica	Billy Branch
Instrumentalist – Horn	Trombone Shorty
Instrumentalist – Vocals	Danielle Nicole
Pinetop Perkins Piano Player	Marcia Ball
Koko Taylor Award (Traditional Blues Female)	Eden Brent
Blues Rock Album of the Year	Help Yourself by Blood Brothers Mike Zito and Albert Castiglia
Blues Rock Artist of the Year	Tommy Castro
Song of the Year	"Can't Catch a Break", written by Tommy Castro and Christoffer Andersen
Soul Blues Album of the Year	Make Them Dance by Johnny Rawls
Soul Blues Female Artist of the Year	Thornetta Davis
Soul Blues Male Artist of the Year	Curtis Salgado
Traditional Blues Album of the Year	Ain't Done with the Blues, Buddy Guy
Traditional Blues Male Artist of the Year	John Primer
International Blues Album	Still Be Friends by J.T. Lauritsen & The Buckshot Hunters

== 2025 ==
Category	Winner
Acoustic Album of the Year	One Guitar Woman, Sue Foley
Acoustic Artist of the Year	Keb' Mo'
Album of the Year	Blame it on Eve, Shemekia Copeland
B. B. King Entertainer of the Year	Mr. Sipp
Band of the Year	Rick Estrin & The Nightcats
Best Emerging Artist Album	Revelation, Piper and the Hard Times
Contemporary Blues Album of the Year	Blues in My DNA, Ronnie Baker Brooks
Contemporary Blues Female Artist of the Year	Ruthie Foster
Contemporary Blues Male Artist of the Year	Ronnie Baker Brooks
Instrumentalist – Bass	Bob Stroger
Instrumentalist – Drums	Kenny "Beedy Eyes" Smith
Instrumentalist – Guitar	Christone "Kingfish" Ingram
Instrumentalist – Harmonica	Billy Branch
Instrumentalist – Horn	Vanessa Collier
Instrumentalist – Vocals	Ruthie Foster
Pinetop Perkins Piano Player	Eden Brent
Koko Taylor Award (Traditional Blues Female)	Sue Foley
Blues Rock Album of the Year	Life is Hard, Mike Zito
Blues Rock Artist of the Year	Tommy Castro
Song of the Year	"Blues in My DNA", written by Ronnie Baker Brooks
Soul Blues Album of the Year	Fine By Me, Curtis Salgado
Soul Blues Female Artist of the Year	Thornetta Davis
Soul Blues Male Artist of the Year	Curtis Salgado
Traditional Blues Album of the Year	Crawlin' Kingsnake, John Primer and Bob Corritore
Traditional Blues Male Artist of the Year	John Primer

== 2024 ==
Category	Winner
Acoustic Album of the Year	Raw Blues 1, Doug MacLeod
Acoustic Artist of the Year	Keb' Mo'
Album of the Year	Live In London, Christone "Kingfish" Ingram
B. B. King Entertainer of the Year	Bobby Rush
Band of the Year	Nick Moss Band
Best Emerging Artist Album	The Right Man, D.K. Harrell
Contemporary Blues Album of the Year	Live In London, Christone "Kingfish" Ingram
Contemporary Blues Female Artist of the Year	Danielle Nicole
Contemporary Blues Male Artist of the Year	Christone "Kingfish" Ingram
Instrumentalist – Bass	Bob Stroger
Instrumentalist – Drums	Kenny "Beedy Eyes" Smith
Instrumentalist – Guitar	Christone "Kingfish" Ingram
Instrumentalist – Harmonica	Jason Ricci
Instrumentalist – Horn	Vanessa Collier
Instrumentalist – Vocals	Ruthie Foster
Pinetop Perkins Piano Player	Kenny "Blues Boss" Wayne
Koko Taylor Award (Traditional Blues Female)	Sue Foley
Blues Rock Album of the Year	Blood Brothers, Mike Zito and Albert Castiglia
Blues Rock Artist of the Year	Mike Zito
Song of the Year	"What Kind of Fool", written by Ruthie Foster, Hadden Sayers and Scottie Miller
Soul Blues Album of the Year	All My Love for You, Bobby Rush
Soul Blues Female Artist of the Year	Annika Chambers
Soul Blues Male Artist of the Year	John Németh
Traditional Blues Album of the Year	Teardrops for Magic Slim: Live at Rosa's Lounge, John Primer
Traditional Blues Male Artist of the Year	John Primer

== 2023 ==
Category	Winner
Acoustic Album of the Year	Mississippi Son, Charlie Musselwhite
Acoustic Artist of the Year	Doug MacLeod
Album of the Year	The Blues Don't Lie, Buddy Guy
B. B. King Entertainer of the Year	Tommy Castro
Band of the Year	Tedeschi Trucks Band
Best Emerging Artist Album	Who Is He?, Dylan Triplett
Contemporary Blues Album of the Year	The Blues Don't Lie, Buddy Guy
Contemporary Blues Female Artist of the Year	Ruthie Foster
Contemporary Blues Male Artist of the Year	Christone "Kingfish" Ingram
Instrumentalist – Bass	Danielle Nicole
Instrumentalist – Drums	Kenny "Beedy Eyes" Smith
Instrumentalist – Guitar	Laura Chavez
Instrumentalist – Harmonica	John Németh
Instrumentalist – Horn	Deanna Bogart
Instrumentalist – Vocals	Shemekia Copeland
Pinetop Perkins Piano Player	Anthony Geraci
Koko Taylor Award (Traditional Blues Female)	Sue Foley
Blues Rock Album of the Year	I Got Love, Albert Castiglia
Blues Rock Artist of the Year	Albert Castiglia
Song of the Year	"Blues Don't Lie" (Tom Hambridge), Buddy Guy
Soul Blues Album of the Year	In Too Deep, Sugaray Rayford
Soul Blues Female Artist of the Year	Thornetta Davis
Soul Blues Male Artist of the Year	Curtis Salgado
Traditional Blues Album of the Year	May Be the Last Time, John Németh
Traditional Blues Male Artist of the Year	John Primer

== 2022 ==
Category	Winner
Acoustic Album of the Year	Dear America, Eric Bibb
Acoustic Artist of the Year	Keb' Mo'
Album of the Year	Tommy Castro Presents A Bluesman Came To Town, Tommy Castro
B. B. King Entertainer of the Year	Tommy Castro
Band of the Year	Tommy Castro & The Painkillers
Best Emerging Artist Album	Live On Beale Street: A Tribute To Bobby "Blue" Bland, Rodd Bland and the Members Only Band
Contemporary Blues Album of the Year	662, Christone "Kingfish" Ingram
Contemporary Blues Female Artist of the Year	Vanessa Collier
Contemporary Blues Male Artist of the Year	Christone "Kingfish" Ingram
Instrumentalist – Bass	Danielle Nicole
Instrumentalist – Drums	Tom Hambridge
Instrumentalist – Guitar	Eric Gales
Instrumentalist – Harmonica	Jason Ricci
Instrumentalist – Horn	Jimmy Carpenter
Instrumentalist – Vocals	John Németh
Pinetop Perkins Piano Player	Mike Finnigan
Koko Taylor Award (Traditional Blues Female)	Sue Foley
Blues Rock Album of the Year	Resurrection, Mike Zito
Blues Rock Artist of the Year	Albert Castiglia
Song of the Year	"I'd Climb Mountains", Selwyn Birchwood
Soul Blues Album of the Year	Long As I Got My Guitar, Zac Harmon
Soul Blues Female Artist of the Year	Annika Chambers
Soul Blues Male Artist of the Year	Curtis Salgado
Traditional Blues Album of the Year	Pinky's Blues, Sue Foley
Traditional Blues Male Artist of the Year	Taj Mahal

== 2021 ==
Category	Winner
Acoustic Album of the Year	Rawer Than Raw, Bobby Rush
Acoustic Artist of the Year	Keb' Mo'
Album of the Year	100 Years of Blues, Elvin Bishop and Charlie Musselwhite
B. B. King Entertainer of the Year	Shemekia Copeland
Band of the Year	Rick Estrin & The Nightcats
Best Emerging Artist Album	Harlem, King Solomon Hicks
Contemporary Blues Album of the Year	Uncivil War, Shemekia Copeland
Contemporary Blues Female Artist of the Year	Shemekia Copeland
Contemporary Blues Male Artist of the Year	Christone "Kingfish" Ingram
Instrumentalist – Bass	Danielle Nicole
Instrumentalist – Drums	Kenny "Beedy Eyes" Smith
Instrumentalist – Guitar	Christone "Kingfish" Ingram
Instrumentalist – Harmonica	Kim Wilson
Instrumentalist – Horn	Jimmy Carpenter
Instrumentalist – Vocals	Ruthie Foster
Pinetop Perkins Piano Player	Anthony Geraci
Koko Taylor Award (Traditional Blues Female)	Rory Block
Blues Rock Album of the Year	Mike Zito and Friends – Rock 'n' Roll: A Tribute to Chuck Berry, Mike Zito
Blues Rock Artist of the Year	Mike Zito
Song of the Year	"All Out of Tears" – written by Walter Trout, Marie Trout, and Teeny Tucker (performed by Walter Trout)
Soul Blues Album of the Year	That's What I Heard, Robert Cray Band
Soul Blues Female Artist of the Year	Bettye LaVette
Soul Blues Male Artist of the Year	Curtis Salgado
Traditional Blues Album of the Year	100 Years of Blues, Elvin Bishop and Charlie Musselwhite
Traditional Blues Male Artist of the Year	John Primer

== 2020 ==
Category	Winner
Acoustic Album of the Year	This Guitar and Tonight, Bob Margolin
Acoustic Artist of the Year	Doug MacLeod
Album of the Year	Kingfish, Christone "Kingfish" Ingram
B. B. King Entertainer of the Year	Sugaray Rayford
Band of the Year	The Nick Moss Band featuring Dennis Gruenling
Best Emerging Artist Album	Kingfish, Christone "Kingfish" Ingram
Contemporary Blues Album of the Year	Kingfish, Christone "Kingfish" Ingram
Contemporary Blues Female Artist of the Year	Shemekia Copeland
Contemporary Blues Male Artist of the Year	Christone "Kingfish" Ingram
Instrumentalist – Bass	Michael "Mudcat" Ward
Instrumentalist – Drums	Cedric Burnside
Instrumentalist – Guitar	Christone "Kingfish" Ingram
Instrumentalist – Harmonica	Rick Estrin
Instrumentalist – Horn	Vanessa Collier
Instrumentalist – Vocals	Mavis Staples
Pinetop Perkins Piano Player	Victor Wainwright
Koko Taylor Award (Traditional Blues Female)	Sue Foley
Blues Rock Album of the Year	Masterpiece, Albert Castiglia
Blues Rock Artist of the Year	Eric Gales
Song of the Year	"Lucky Guy", Nick Moss
Soul Blues Album of the Year	Sitting on Top of the Blues, Bobby Rush
Soul Blues Female Artist of the Year	Bettye LaVette
Soul Blues Male Artist of the Year	Sugaray Rayford
Traditional Blues Album of the Year	Lucky Guy!, The Nick Moss Band featuring Dennis Gruenling
Traditional Blues Male Artist of the Year	Jimmie Vaughan

== 2019 ==
Category	Winner
Acoustic Album of the Year	Journeys to the Heart of the Blues, Joe Louis Walker, Bruce Katz, Giles Robson
Acoustic Artist of the Year	Rory Block
Album of the Year	America's Child, Shemekia Copeland
B. B. King Entertainer of the Year	Mike Ledbetter
Band of the Year	Welch-Ledbetter Connection
Best Emerging Artist Album	Free, Amanda Fish
Contemporary Blues Album of the Year	America's Child, Shemekia Copeland
Contemporary Blues Female Artist of the Year	Danielle Nicole
Contemporary Blues Male Artist of the Year	Kenny Neal
Instrumentalist – Bass	Danielle Nicole
Instrumentalist – Drums	Cedric Burnside
Instrumentalist – Guitar	Monster Mike Welch
Instrumentalist – Harmonica	Dennis Gruenling
Instrumentalist – Horn	Vanessa Collier
Instrumentalist – Vocals	Mike Ledbetter
Pinetop Perkins Piano Player	Marcia Ball
Koko Taylor Award (Traditional Blues Female)	Ruthie Foster
Blues Rock Album of the Year	The Big Bad Blues, Billy F Gibbons
Blues Rock Artist of the Year	Eric Gales
Song of the Year	"No Mercy In This Land", Ben Harper and Charlie Musselwhite
Soul Blues Album of the Year	I'm Still Around, Johnny Rawls
Soul Blues Female Artist of the Year	Annika Chambers
Soul Blues Male Artist of the Year	Sugaray Rayford
Traditional Blues Album of the Year	The Blues Is Alive and Well, Buddy Guy
Traditional Blues Male Artist of the Year	Nick Moss

== 2018 ==
Category	Winner
Acoustic Album of the Year	Break the Chain, Doug MacLeod
Acoustic Artist of the Year	Taj Mahal
Album of the Year	TajMo, Taj Mahal & Keb' Mo'
B. B. King Entertainer of the Year	Taj Mahal
Band of the Year	Rick Estrin & The Nightcats
Best Emerging Artist Album	Southern Avenue – Southern Avenue
Contemporary Blues Album of the Year	TajMo, Taj Mahal & Keb' Mo'
Contemporary Blues Female Artist of the Year	Samantha Fish
Contemporary Blues Male Artist of the Year	Keb' Mo'
Historical Album of the Year	A Legend Never Dies, Essential Recordings 1976-1997 – Luther Allison
Instrumentalist – Bass	Michael "Mudcat" Ward
Instrumentalist – Drums	Tony Braunagel
Instrumentalist – Guitar	Ronnie Earl
Instrumentalist – Harmonica	Jason Ricci
Instrumentalist – Horn	Trombone Shorty
Instrumentalist – Vocals	Beth Hart
Pinetop Perkins Piano Player	Victor Wainwright
Koko Taylor Award (Traditional Blues Female)	Ruthie Foster
Blues Rock Album of the Year	We’re All In This Together, Walter Trout
Blues Rock Artist of the Year	Mike Zito
Song of the Year	"The Blues Ain’t Going Nowhere", Rick Estrin
Soul Blues Album of the Year	Robert Cray & Hi Rhythm – Robert Cray & Hi Rhythm
Soul Blues Female Artist of the Year	Mavis Staples
Soul Blues Male Artist of the Year	Curtis Salgado
Traditional Blues Album of the Year	Right Place, Right Time, Monster Mike Welch and Mike Ledbetter
Traditional Blues Male Artist of the Year	Rick Estrin

== 2017 ==
Category	Winner
Acoustic Album of the Year	The Happiest Man in the World, Eric Bibb
Acoustic Artist of the Year	Doug MacLeod
Album of the Year	Porcupine Meat, Bobby Rush
B. B. King Entertainer of the Year	Joe Bonamassa
Band of the Year	Tedeschi Trucks Band
Best Emerging Artist Album	Tengo Blues, Jonn Del Toro Richardson
Contemporary Blues Album of the Year	Bloodline, Kenny Neal
Contemporary Blues Female Artist of the Year	Susan Tedeschi
Contemporary Blues Male Artist of the Year	Kenny Neal
Historical Album of the Year	Chicken Heads: A 50-Year History of Bobby Rush, Bobby Rush
Instrumentalist – Bass	Biscuit Miller
Instrumentalist – Drums	Cedric Burnside
Instrumentalist – Guitar	Joe Bonamassa
Instrumentalist – Harmonica	Kim Wilson
Instrumentalist – Horn	Terry Hanck
Pinetop Perkins Piano Player	Victor Wainwright
Koko Taylor Award (Traditional Blues Female)	Diunna Greenleaf
Rock Blues Album of the Year	Let Me Get By, Tedeschi Trucks Band
Song of the Year	"Walk A Mile In My Blues", Curtis Salgado
Soul Blues Album of the Year	The Beautiful Lowdown, Curtis Salgado
Soul Blues Female Artist of the Year	Mavis Staples
Soul Blues Male Artist of the Year	Curtis Salgado
Traditional Blues Album of the Year	Can't Shake This Feeling, Lurrie Bell
Traditional Blues Male Artist of the Year	Bob Margolin

== 2016 ==
Category	Winner
Acoustic Album of the Year	The Acoustic Blues & Roots of Duke Robillard, Duke Robillard
Acoustic Artist of the Year	Doug MacLeod
Album of the Year	Born to Play Guitar, Buddy Guy
B. B. King Entertainer of the Year	Victor Wainwright
Band of the Year	Victor Wainwright & the WildRoots
Best New Artist Debut	The Mississippi Blues Child, Mr. Sipp
Contemporary Blues Album of the Year	Born to Play Guitar, Buddy Guy
Contemporary Blues Female Artist of the Year	Shemekia Copeland
Contemporary Blues Male Artist of the Year	Joe Louis Walker
Historical Album of the Year	Buzzin’ the Blues, Slim Harpo
Instrumentalist – Bass	Lisa Mann
Instrumentalist – Drums	Cedric Burnside
Instrumentalist – Guitar	Sonny Landreth
Instrumentalist – Harmonica	Kim Wilson
Instrumentalist – Horn	Terry Hanck
Pinetop Perkins Piano Player	Allen Toussaint
Koko Taylor Award (Traditional Blues Female)	Ruthie Foster
Rock Blues Album of the Year	Battle Scars, Walter Trout
Song of the Year	"Gonna Live Again", Walter Trout
Soul Blues Album of the Year	This Time for Real, Billy Price and Otis Clay
Soul Blues Female Artist of the Year	Bettye LaVette
Soul Blues Male Artist of the Year	Otis Clay
Traditional Blues Album of the Year	Descendants of Hill Country, Cedric Burnside Project
Traditional Blues Male Artist of the Year	John Primer

== 2015 ==
Category	Winner
Acoustic Album of the Year	Timeless, John Hammond
Acoustic Artist of the Year	John Hammond
Album of the Year	Can't Even Do Wrong Right, Elvin Bishop
B. B. King Entertainer of the Year	Bobby Rush
Band of the Year	Elvin Bishop Band
Best New Artist Debut	Don't Call No Ambulance, Selwyn Birchwood
Contemporary Blues Album of the Year	BLUESAmericana, Keb' Mo'
Contemporary Blues Female Artist of the Year	Janiva Magness
Contemporary Blues Male Artist of the Year	Gary Clark, Jr.
Historical Album of the Year	Soul & Swagger: The Complete “5” Royales 1951-1967 – The "5" Royales
Instrumentalist – Bass	Lisa Mann
Instrumentalist – Drums	Jimi Bott
Instrumentalist – Guitar	Joe Bonamassa
Instrumentalist – Harmonica	Charlie Musselwhite
Instrumentalist – Horn	Deanna Bogart
Pinetop Perkins Piano Player	Marcia Ball
Koko Taylor Award (Traditional Blues Female)	Ruthie Foster
Rock Blues Album of the Year	Step Back, Johnny Winter
Song of the Year	"Can't Even Do Wrong Right", Elvin Bishop
Soul Blues Album of the Year	Memphis Grease, John Németh
Soul Blues Female Artist of the Year	Sista Monica
Soul Blues Male Artist of the Year	Bobby Rush
Traditional Blues Album of the Year	For Pops (A Tribute to Muddy Waters), Mud Morganfield, Kim Wilson
Traditional Blues Male Artist of the Year	Lurrie Bell

== 2014 ==
Category	Winner
Acoustic Album of the Year	There's A Time, Doug MacLeod
Acoustic Artist of the Year	Doug MacLeod
Album of the Year	Remembering Little Walter, Billy Boy Arnold, Charlie Musselwhite, Mark Hummel, Sugar Ray Norcia and James Harman
B. B. King Entertainer of the Year	Buddy Guy
Band of the Year	Tedeschi Trucks Band
Best New Artist Debut	Daddy Told Me, Shawn Holt & the Teardrops
Contemporary Blues Album of the Year	Badlands, Trampled Under Foot
Contemporary Blues Female Artist of the Year	Susan Tedeschi
Contemporary Blues Male Artist of the Year	Gary Clark, Jr.
DVD	Songs From The Road, Royal Southern Brotherhood
Historical Album of the Year	The Sun Blues Box, Various artists
Instrumentalist – Bass	Danielle Schnebelen
Instrumentalist – Drums	Cedric Burnside
Instrumentalist – Guitar	Ronnie Earl
Instrumentalist – Harmonica	Charlie Musselwhite
Instrumentalist – Horn	Eddie Shaw
Pinetop Perkins Piano Player	Victor Wainwright
Koko Taylor Award (Traditional Blues Female)	Diunna Greenleaf
Rock Blues Album of the Year	Made Up Mind, Tedeschi Trucks Band
Song of the Year	"Blues in My Soul", Lurrie Bell
Soul Blues Album of the Year	Down in Louisiana, Bobby Rush
Soul Blues Female Artist of the Year	Irma Thomas
Soul Blues Male Artist of the Year	John Németh
Traditional Blues Album of the Year	Remembering Little Walter, Billy Boy Arnold, Charlie Musselwhite, Mark Hummel, Sugar Ray Norcia and James Harman
Traditional Blues Male Artist of the Year	James Cotton

== 2011 ==
Category	Winner
Acoustic Album of the Year	Last Train to Bluesville, The Nighthawks
Acoustic Artist of the Year	John Hammond
Album of the Year	Living Proof, Buddy Guy
B. B. King Entertainer of the Year	Buddy Guy
Band of the Year	The Derek Trucks Band
Best New Artist Debut	On the Floor, Matt Hill
Contemporary Blues Album of the Year	Living Proof, Buddy Guy
Contemporary Blues Female Artist of the Year	Robin Rogers
Contemporary Blues Male Artist of the Year	Buddy Guy
DVD	Ruf, Songs From The Road, Luther Allison
Historical Album of the Year	Harmonica Blues, Bob Corritore and Friends
Instrumentalist – Bass	Bob Stroger
Instrumentalist – Drums	Cedric Burnside
Instrumentalist – Guitar	Derek Trucks
Instrumentalist – Harmonica	Charlie Musselwhite
Instrumentalist – Horn	Eddie Shaw
Instrumentalist – Other	Sonny Rhodes, Lap steel guitar
Koko Taylor Award (Traditional Blues Female)	Ruthie Foster
Pinetop Perkins Piano Player	Dr. John
Rock Blues Album of the Year	Live! In Chicago, Kenny Wayne Shepherd Band featuring Hubert Sumlin, Willie "Big Eyes" Smith, Bryan Lee and Buddy Flett
Song of the Year	"Living Proof", (Tom Hambridge / Buddy Guy), Living Proof, Buddy Guy
Soul Blues Album of the Year	Nothing's Impossible, Solomon Burke
Soul Blues Female Artist of the Year	Irma Thomas
Soul Blues Male Artist of the Year	Solomon Burke
Traditional Blues Album of the Year	Joined At the Hip, Pinetop Perkins and Willie "Big Eyes" Smith
Traditional Blues Male Artist of the Year	Charlie Musselwhite
