= Ghost Town Blues Band =

American blues band

- Origin: Memphis, Tennessee, US
- Genres: Blues, blues rock
- Years active: 2009–present
- Labels: Inside Sounds, Independent
- Members: Matt Isbell: Matt Karner; Garrett Marshall; Grayson Smith; Grady Henderson
- Past members: Kevin Houston: Taylor Orr; Tim Stanek; Dusty Sikes; Cedric Taylor; Jeremy Powell; Suavo Jones
- Website: Official website

Ghost Town Blues Band is an American blues and blues rock band. Formed in 2009 in Memphis, Tennessee, United States, they have released five albums (including one live recording) since 2010. Their 2019 album, Shine, reached number one on the US Billboard Top Blues Albums Chart. They have opened for the Steve Miller Band, John Mayall, Keb' Mo', Jonny Lang, John Lee Hooker Jr. and Booker T. Jones.

Living Blues magazine stated "GTBB shows what can happen when the past is distilled through young sensibilities, voices, and instruments. This is 21st century blues at its best." The six piece band uses an unusual array of musical instruments, including organs, cigar box guitars, harmonicas, electric push brooms, plus brass and percussion.

== Career ==
Matt Isbell, who became the Ghost Town Blues band's frontman, took piano lessons from the age of 10, but was drawn towards the guitar. He learned to play at home on a small guitar with only three viable strings, and played in an open chord style, a technique which he still uses today on his home-made cigar box guitars. Having seen Todd Snider Performing on Highland St in Memphis and on Beale Street, and getting a six-string acoustic Goya dreadnought for his 12th birthday, Isbell attempted to learn to play every track on Snider's 1994 album, Songs for the Daily Planet. In high school Isbell formed his first band, The Blind Venetians, along with current Ghost Town lead guitarist Taylor Orr. They recorded one record at the joint age of 15, but the band broke up when the members graduated highschool. later becoming a member of the Stax Music Academy SNAP! program, Isbell then spent the next seven years in a rock band playing cover versions, but when his mother died suddenly from a stroke, Isbell started to reassess his future. In 2007, while a student in the University of Memphis music business program and released a solo album, Rock Lotto. With the intention of forming a new band, Isbell found another young musician in Suavo Jones, an ever-present in the line-up. They were initially joined by Jeremy Powell, a keyboardist who went on to work with Eddie Palmieri and Southern Avenue. While in their formative state, the band's name and now trademark second-line entrance to the stage, arose from their inability to draw a crowd. "Nobody was in the club half the time when we'd play," Isbell remembered. "We'd say: 'It's a ghost town in here. We must be the Ghost Town Blues Band.'" In attempting to boost trade they decided to take their music out on to Beale Street, which led to the origination of their second-line.

Their fusion approach to playing is rooted in Isbell's singer-songwriter background, whereas Suavo had a grounding in hip hop. More recent keyboardist recruit, Cedric Taylor, has Southern Baptist Church leanings and, after lengthy persuasion, childhood friend and bandmate with a Jam background, Taylor Orr was employed. Bass player Matt Karner is a native of northern New Jersey, and has a jazz based upbringing. Andrew McNeill is the band's drummer. Debuting in 2009, the outfit was originally a blues rock band, playing music such as the Creedence Clearwater Revival version of Screamin' Jay Hawkins's "I Put A Spell On You". Nevertheless, their debut album, Dust The Dust (2010), only contained five covers. Released via Inside Sounds, Dust the Dust received radio airplay in both the US and Europe. The recording won the European Independent Music Label Award for 'Top Sound' in blues. The album, Dark Horse, followed in 2012.

In 2012, the Ghost Town Blues Band played at the Crossroads Blues & Heritage Festival in Rosedale, Mississippi. In 2014 the band, having made the finals for the second year running, came runners up to Mr. Sipp in the International Blues Challenge. Hard Road To Hoe was released in 2014, and the album track's opened with an original composition by Taylor Orr, "Another Lover". Although it was self released, the album got the band a higher profile. They were nominated for the Best Blues Band Award for the 2015 Blues Blast Music Awards, the first of multiple nominations. They performed for a whole tour as the opening act for the Steve Miller Band, plus played at a number of festivals across the US, and were booked on 12 overseas tours in 2017 and 2018.

On February 27, 2018, the Ghost Town Blues Band issued a live album, Backstage Pass, which captured a concert in Memphis on July 29, 2017. It was the band's fourth album. The recording started with a cover of the Beatles' "Come Together", and provided a showcase for the twin guitars of Taylor Orr and Matt Isbell on their version of The Allman Brothers Band song, "Whipping Post". Backstage Pass climbed to No. 4 on US Billboard Top Blues Albums Chart.

Their latest album, Shine, debuted at No. 1 on Billboard's Top Blues Album Chart in October 2019. They had previously headlined on the blues stage at the Montreal International Jazz Festival and performed more than a dozen international tours in Canada and Europe including Germany and Lucerne, Switzerland.

== Musical instruments ==
Isbell is a prolific three string cigar box guitar maker, having manufactured over 600 instruments since 2010. His clientele has included Eric Schrenkman of the Spin Doctors, Cyndi Lauper, Michael Leonhart of Steely Dan and Joe Bonamassa. All guitars are fretless and are designed to play using a slide, of which Isbell makes about 200 a month, manufactured in his home workshop.

== Awards ==
Ghost Town Blues Band was placed second in the International Blues Challenge in 2014.

They were the winner of the International Songwriting Competition in 2015 and 2022.

== Band members ==
=== Current ===
- Garrett Marshall (drums)
- Matt Karner (bass guitar)
- Matt Isbell (multi-instruments, vocals)
- Grady Henderson (saxophone, backing vocals)
- Grayson Smith (keyboards)

=== Previous ===
- Kevin Houston (saxophone, studio engineer and producer)
- Tim Stanek (keyboards)
- Dusty Sikes (bass guitar)
- Josh Roberts (lead guitar)
- Taylor Orr (lead guitar)
- Dusty Sikes (bass guitar)

== Discography ==
Year	Title	Label	US Billboard Top Blues Albums Chart
2010	Dust the Dust	Inside Sounds	–
2012	Dark Horse	Inside Sounds	–
2015	Hard Road to Hoe	Self-release	–
2018	Backstage Pass	Self-release	4
2019	Shine	Self-release	1
2023	Live in Lucerne	Self-release DVD	
