= Doug MacLeod =

Doug MacLeod may refer to:

- Doug MacLeod (musician) (born 1946), American blues musician, guitarist, and songwriter
- Doug MacLeod (writer) (1959–2021), Australian screenwriter and author
