= Lisa Mann =

American singer

- Born: West Virginia, United States
- Origin: Portland, Oregon, United States
- Genres: Electric blues, Heavy metal, Power metal
- Occupations: Bassist, singer, songwriter
- Instrument: Bass guitar
- Years active: 1990s–present

Lisa Mann is an American electric blues and heavy metal bassist, songwriter and singer. Her influences include Etta James, Koko Taylor, Bonnie Raitt, Sheryl Crow, and Little Milton. She writes most of her material, and has released four albums to date. In 2015 and 2016, she won a Blues Music Award.

== Life and career ==
Mann was born in West Virginia, United States. As a young child she and her sister, Maryann, were moved to Portland, Oregon, from Milpitas, California, as an escape from her abusive father. Somewhat inspired after hearing the bass line of the Imperial Guard music in Star Wars, Mann purchased her first bass guitar at age eleven. She learned to play after listening to work by Deep Purple, Cream, Black Sabbath and Led Zeppelin. She graduated to studying the blues and began a professional career at the age of 19. After playing in the Seattle rock scene, Mann travelled back to Portland and stood in as Paul deLay's substitute bassist. She originally played a four string bass, but moved onto a six string version to fill out her burgeoning rhythm and blues inspired sound.

In 2011, Mann performed with her backing ensemble, the Really Good Band, in the International Blues Challenge, reaching the semi-final stage. She released her ultimately well received album, Satisfied, in 2012.

Mann's 2014 album, Move On, paid tribute to her mother, whose lengthy illness prior to her death led Mann to stressful times, causing the loss of her own voice for several months prior to recording the album. Move On appeared in the Living Blues chart and made the Top 20 of the Roots Music Reports Blues Album Chart in May 2014. The album included her cover of Little Milton's "The Blues Is Alright". The first single from Move On entitled "You Don't Know," was issued in March 2014.

Mann appeared at the Waterfront Blues Festival in 2009, where she also married fellow musician, Allen Markel. She appeared at the Festival again in 2015.

Since 2020, Mann has been the vocalist for the heavy metal band Splintered Throne and, independently, as the power metal act White Crone. With Splintered Throne, Mann released The Greater Good of Man (2022). As White Crone, Mann has issued three singles: "The Poisoner" (2020), "Prognosticator" (2024), and "The Conscript" (2024).

== Awards ==
Mann has been inducted into the Cascade Blues Association Hall of Fame, and has gained the Muddy Waters Award for Bass Player of the Year three times. In 2012, she was also awarded the Portland Music Award for Outstanding Achievement in Blues.

In May 2015, Mann was granted a Blues Music Award in the 'Instrumentalist – Bass' category. In 2016, she again won this award.

== Discography ==
=== Albums ===
Year	Title	Record label
2006	Self Material	Self released
2010	Lisa Mann	Self released/CD Baby
2012	Satisfied	Self released
2014	Move On	Self released
2016	Hard Times, Bad Decisions	Self released

== See also ==
- List of electric blues musicians
