= Annika Chambers =

American blues singer and songwriter (born 1985)

- Born: Annika Shattrelle Chambers; August 7, 1985 (age 41); Houston, Texas, United States
- Genres: Soul blues
- Occupations: Singer, songwriter
- Instrument: Vocals
- Years active: 2011–present
- Website: www.annikachambers.com

Annika Shattrelle Chambers (born August 7, 1985) is an American soul blues singer and songwriter. Chambers has released three albums, and she won a Blues Music Award in 2019 in the 'Soul Blues Female Artist of the Year' category.

Her sophomore release, Wild & Free, debuted at number 7 on the Billboard Blues Albums Chart. Her third album, Kiss My Sass, was released in August 2019.

== Biography ==
Chambers was born in Houston, Texas, United States. As she stated "I grew up singing in the church", and was inspired by the gospel musicianship of Yolanda Adams, Shirley Caesar, Dottie Peoples and Whitney Houston.

She enlisted in the United States Army, and spent over seven years in armed service. During her two tours of duty Chambers was invited to sing the National Anthem at a ceremony, which led to her performing for the troops as part of a touring band in both Kosovo and Iraq. In 2011, Chambers returned to Houston, and formed her own band, Annika Chambers and The House Rules Band. The ensemble entered the International Blues Challenge in late 2012, and, despite not proceeding beyond the final qualifying round, her talents were noticed by two of the judging panel. She recorded what was to be a demo with Larry Fulcher (of Taj Mahal's Phantom Blues Band) and Richard Cagle, but this was released as her debut album. Making My Mark (2014), credited to Annika Chambers & the Houston All-Stars, reached number 16 on the Living Blues chart. Chambers was nominated in 2015 for a Blues Music Award in the 'Best New Artist Debut' category.

This initial success was brought to a temporary halt. In 2015, Chambers worked as a recruiting assistant for the Texas National Guard, and she became involved with others in claiming fraudulent bonuses for acquiring new recruits. Chambers received around $17,000. She pleaded guilty and served six months in prison.

Her second album, Wild & Free (2016), debuted at number 7 on the Billboard Blues Albums Chart. The album saw Chambers backed by the guitarist Johnny Lee Schell, keyboard player Mike Finnigan, bassist Larry Fulcher and drummer Tony Braunagel. Guest artists included the pianist Jon Cleary. The twelve-track Wild & Free contained Chambers self-penned song "Reality" plus her cover of Katie Melua's "Piece by Piece". Subsequently, Chambers appeared at music festivals in South America, Europe and the US (the latter including Minnesota Bayfront Blues Festival, Las Vegas Blues Bender, Gloucester Blues Festival, and the Mississippi Delta Blues Festival). In 2018, this led to her being nominated again for a Blues Music Award.

Chambers won a Blues Music Award in 2019 in the 'Soul Blues Female Artist of the Year' category. Her third album, Kiss My Sass, was released on August 9, 2019. On December 7, 2019, she performed at the Bradenton Blues Festival.

== Discography ==
=== Albums ===
Year	Title	Record label	Notes
2014	Making My Mark	CD Baby	Billed as Annika Chambers & the Houston All-Stars
2016	Wild & Free	Oarfin Records	
2019	Kiss My Sass	Vizztone Records	

== See also ==
- List of soul-blues musicians
