= Jon Shain =

American singer-songwriter

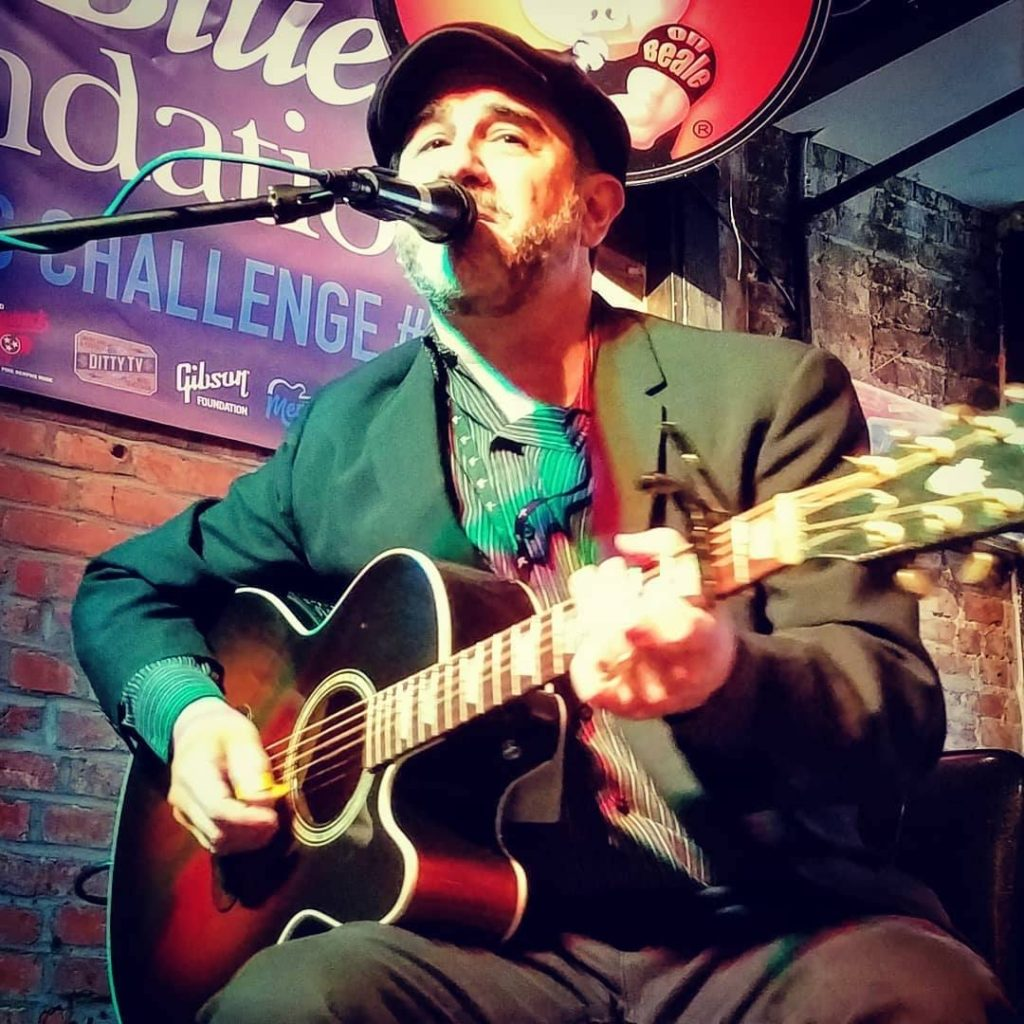
- Jon Shain publicity photo from 2023

Background information
- Born: Jonathan Bruce Shain; November 18, 1967 (age 58); Haverhill, Massachusetts, United States
- Genres: Folk, Americana, Piedmont blues
- Occupations: Guitarist, singer-songwriter
- Years active: 1980–present
- Labels: Flyin' Records
- Members: Jon Shain Trio; FJ Ventre: upright bass John Currie: dobro and guitar Bill Newton: harmonica
- Website: jonshain.com

Jon Shain (born Jonathan Bruce Shain, November 18, 1967 in Haverhill, Massachusetts, United States) is an American folk musician, guitarist, singer-songwriter, producer, teacher, and recording artist based in Durham, North Carolina. Shain is the 2019 International Blues Challenge winner in the solo/duo category.

Shain has released ten solo albums, and has also recorded with the bands WAKE and Flyin' Mice. Since 1988, he has performed live with Jorma Kaukonen, David Grisman, Jackson Browne, John Hiatt, and others. Shain played electric guitar as part of Big Boy Henry's backing band in the 1980s.

== Early life ==
Shain is Jewish, the eldest of three children to Steven and Carol Shain, who are also Haverhill, Massachusetts natives. His father and grandfather operated a small but successful textile dyehouse.

Shain got his first acoustic guitar after being influenced by watching childhood friend Fran Cleary play a cheap Univox electric model. Things went poorly, as within a short time, he accidentally broke the rented instrument in half. At age 12 he started up again with another borrowed model, this time showing more serious interest and taking lessons.

For high school, Shain attended The Governor's Academy in Byfield, Massachusetts, where he met up with other aspiring musicians among its small student body. Almost immediately, Shain joined a student rock band called Positive Feedback, where he played electric rhythm guitar and first performed live on stage. At age 14, he was the youngest member of the band. The following year, Shain and childhood friend Jim Barr, along with fellow students FJ Ventre and John Miller, formed another rock cover band called The Partisans (the band's name unknowingly matched an already established punk band from the UK). This experience further sharpened his skills and confidence as a live performer, as he was responsible for most of the arrangements performed by the band. The Partisans achieved minor notoriety throughout the region, playing dances and private parties during Shain's remaining years in high school. Eventually mixing in originals by Shain and Barr, The Partisans live set mainly consisted of classic rock staples from Chuck Berry, The Beatles, The Rolling Stones, The Clash, R.E.M., and U2.

Shain graduated from the academy in 1985.

== College years ==
Shain attended Duke University in Durham, North Carolina, where he majored in history. It was during this time that Shain was introduced to the folk music of the region. In addition to playing in a frat-rock cover band, The Blind Mice, Shain began to research and play Piedmont blues. Shain joined The Slewfoot Blues Band, led by Mickey "Slewfoot" McLaughlin and "Sleepy" Tom Forsythe. Through Slewfoot, Shain met North Carolina blues artists such as Big Boy Henry, John Dee Holeman, Lightnin' Wells, and jazz pianist Brother Yusef Salim. Shain has described his style of blues as being based on Piedmont blues and has said, "I'm interested in the kinds of songs that aren't necessarily in standard blues progressions." Shain also took opportunity of Duke's jazz program, studying one semester with saxophonist Paul Jeffrey, a veteran of Thelonious Monk's group. Shain graduated from Duke in the summer of 1989, and immediately began pursuing a career in music.

== Professional career ==
In 1989, Shain and bassist John Whitehead formed a blues-rock duo, Flyin' Mice. They began to play shows at local clubs and festivals in The Carolinas and Virginia. Catching the ear of soundman and recording engineer Charles Jones, Flyin' Mice was signed to Jones' fledgling independent label Dr. Lime Records. The Mice expanded to a trio with the addition of drummer Mark Simonsen. In 1992, John Whitehead left the band and was replaced by bassist Aaron Oliva and Ben Saffer on guitar and banjo. Flyin' Mice earned the tag "psychedelic bluegrass", due to its incorporation of vintage bluegrass influences into its jam-rock performance style. This incarnation of the band gigged steadily up and down the East Coast until the band's breakup in 1996.

In 1996, Shain and Simonsen started a new group called WAKE, with Kirsten O'Rourke Simonsen on vocals and Stu Cole on bass. In 1997, Cole left to join Squirrel Nut Zippers and he was replaced by Darrell Dixon on bass and John Currie on guitar. WAKE leaned more towards an alt-country sound. WAKE broke up in early 1998.

In 1998, Shain and Simonsen began work on what would become Jon Shain's first solo album, Brand New Lifetime, which ranged from the alt-country of WAKE to a more stripped down re-discovery of Shain's acoustic blues background. Shain began to play shows solo and with his new group, The Jon Shain Trio – composed of FJ Ventre on bass, John Currie on dobro and guitar, and Bill Newton on harmonica. This group stayed together the longest of any of Shain's musical associations. Shain has recorded several albums on his own Flyin' Records and continues to tour and record regularly with FJ Ventre.

== Recognition ==
Shain was the winner of the North Carolina's Indy Award for Best Folk Act in 2006. In 2008 and 2018 he won the Triangle Blues Society's Blues Challenge. He was the 2019 International Blues Challenge winner in the solo/duo category.

== Discography ==
=== Solo albums ===
| 1999 | Brand New Lifetime | Flyin' Records | CD |
| 2001 | Fools and Fine Ladies | Flyin' Records | CD |
| 2003 | No Tag, No Tail Light | Flyin' Records | CD |
| 2005 | Home Before Long | Flyin' Records | CD |
| 2007 | Army Jacket Winter | Flyin' Records | CD |
| 2009 | Times Right Now | Flyin' Records | CD |
| 2011 | The Kress Sessions | Flyin' Records | CD |
| 2013 | Ordinary Cats | Flyin' Records | CD |
| 2014 | Reupholstered | Flyin' Records | CD |
| 2018 | Gettin' Handy with the Blues - a Tribute to the Legacy of W.C. Handy | Flyin' Records | CD |

=== Other albums ===
| 1988 | Big Boy Henry & The; Slewfoot Blues Band | Big Boy Henry & The; Slewfoot Blues Band | Self-released | Cassette |
| 1991 | Flyin' Mice | So Hi Drive | Dr. Lime Records | CD and Cassette |
| 1992 | Flyin' Mice | "Paranoia Drugstore Blues" b/w "Running Free" | Dr. Lime Records | 7" single |
| 1994 | Flyin' Mice | Brighter Day | Dr. Lime Records | CD and Cassette |
| 1996 | Flyin' Mice | So Long | Self-released | Cassette |
| 1997 | WAKE | WAKE | Flyin' Records | CD |
| 2016 | Jon Shain and Joe Newberry | Crow the Dawn | Flyin' Records | CD |
| 2018 | Jon Shain and FJ Ventre | Tomorrow Will Be Yesterday Soon | Flyin' Records | CD |
| 2021 | Jon Shain and FJ Ventre | Never Found a Way to Tame the Blues | Flyin' Records | CD |

=== Other recording appearances ===
| 1999 | David Scott Kepford | Steps | DSK Records | CD |
| 2000 | Phil Cohen and Patricia Ford | Caution to the Wind | Hard Miles Music | CD |
| 2001 | Judy Woodall's Muletrain | Black Pony | Back Home Music | CD |
| 2003 | Phil Cohen and Patricia Ford | Long Road 'til Sunrise | Hard Miles Music | CD |
| 2003 | Judy Woodall and Muletrain | Monkey Goat Sinnerman | Back Home Music | CD |
| 2004 | Dana Kletter | Mrs. Moon | | CD |
| 2008 | Jefferson Pepper | American Evolution | American Fallout Records | CD |
| 2010 | Jim Avett | Tribes | Ramseur Records | CD |
| 2010 | Greg Humphreys | Realign Your Mind | Phrex Records | CD |
| 2010 | Danny Gotham | Guitarheel | Nuffsaid Records | CD |
| 2010 | Jon Shain | Song for Isabella | in the film Generation Exile | DVD |
| 2010 | Jon Shain | Winter Waits | Hudson Harding Holiday Sampler vol. 5 | CD |
| 2011 | Jim Avett | Second Chances | Ramseur Records | CD |
| 2014 | Danny Gotham | Repast | Nuffsaid Records | CD |
| 2016 | Phil Cohen and Patricia Ford | Threads of Gold | Hard Miles Music | CD |
| 2016 | Isabel Taylor | Awake Again | Self-released | CD |
| 2016 | Suzanne Schmid | The Field Hand | Self-released | CD |
| 2016 | Penny Pierce | self-titled | Self-released | CD |
| 2017 | And Dan | For Better and for Worse | Self-released | CD |
| 2017 | Rick Drost | Turning the World | Self-released | CD |
| 2017 | Leah Kaufman | On to Something Fine | Self-released | CD |
| 2018 | Wes Collins | Welcome to the Ether | Self-released | CD |
| 2018 | Karyn Oliver | A List of Names | Self-released | CD |
| 2018 | Barry Gray | Footsteps | Self-released | CD |
| 2019 | Isabel Taylor | Isabel Taylor | Self-released | CD |
| 2019 | Leah Kaufman | Midnight Refrain | Self-released | CD |
| 2019 | Kirby Heard | Mama's Biscuits | Self-released | CD |
| 2019 | Alex Hardy | Come out the West | Self-released | CD |
| 2020 | Penne Sandbeck | Hwy 17 Revisited | Self-released | CD |
| 2020 | Penne Sandbeck | Gypsy Mountain Man | Hudson Harding Holiday Sampler vol. 15 | CD |
| 2020 | Jon Shain and FJ Ventre | Thank God the Liquor Stores Don't Close on Christmas Eve | Hudson Harding Holiday Sampler vol. 15 | CD |
| 2021 | Donna Herula | Bang at the Door | Self-released | CD |
| 2021 | Lynn Swisher Spears | Walking the Cat | Self-released | CD |

== Family life ==
In 1997, Shain married graphic designer Maria Bilinski. The couple have one daughter, Johanna, born in 2002. Shain has written a song for each of them, both of which can be found on Army Jacket Winter.
