= Christone "Kingfish" Ingram =

American blues guitarist and singer

Christone Ingram
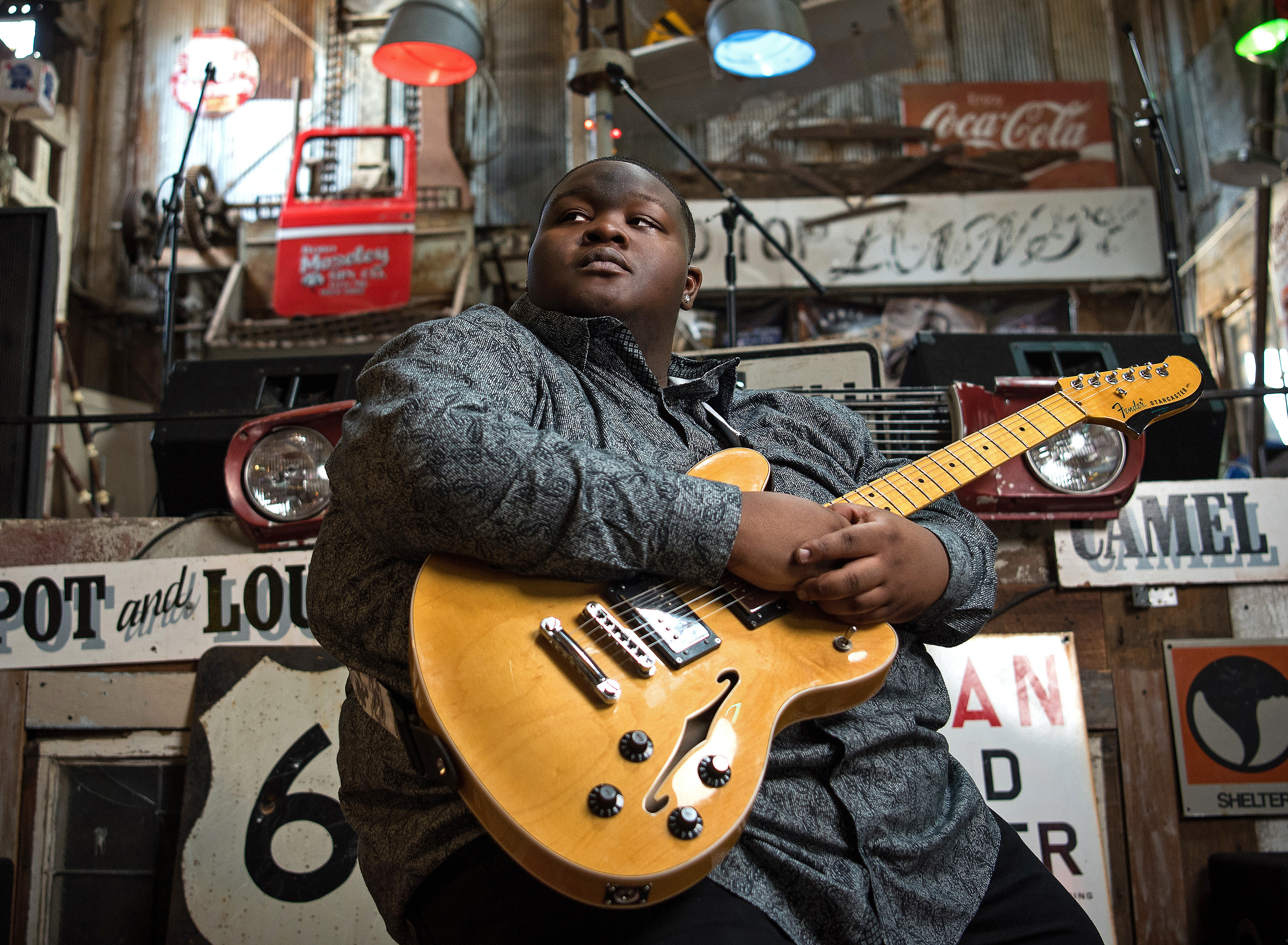
- Ingram in 2019

Background information
- Also known as: Kingfish
- Born: January 19, 1999 (age 27); Clarksdale, Mississippi, U.S.
- Genres: Blues; rock; blues rock; soul; gospel
- Occupation: Musician
- Instruments: Vocals; guitar; bass; drums
- Years active: 2014–present
- Labels: Alligator; Red Zero
- Website: www.christonekingfishingram.com

Christone "Kingfish" Ingram (born January 19, 1999) is an American blues guitarist and singer from Clarksdale, Mississippi, United States, who became a well-known performer as a teenager. His debut album, Kingfish, was released in May 2019. In addition to his own albums, musicians he has recorded with include Eric Gales, Buddy Guy, Ally Venable and Keb Mo. He has shared the stage with well-known blues artists and younger blues musicians such as the Tedeschi Trucks Band, Samantha Fish, Bob Margolin, Eric Gales, Mr. Sipp, Rick Derringer, Guitar Shorty and Buddy Guy.

== Background ==
=== Early life ===
Christone Ingram was born to Princess Pride and Christopher Ingram of Clarksdale, Mississippi in 1999. His mother is a first cousin to country musician Charley Pride.

His extended family sang and played music in church. Ingram grew up attending gospel music performances and while still young got up to join groups, although without any competency. He listened to and learned from music by Robert Johnson, Lightnin' Hopkins, B. B. King, Muddy Waters, Jimi Hendrix, Prince and others.

=== Musical background ===
Ingram became interested in the blues around age 5 when his father showed him a PBS documentary about Muddy Waters, and at the same time promised they would go to the Delta Blues Museum to learn all about the music. He was taught how to play by Bill "Howl -N- Mad" Perry and Richard "Daddy Rich" Crisman at the arts and education program of the museum. Ingram also attended Clarksdale's Pinetop Perkins Workshop Experience held every summer. Perry gave Ingram the nickname "Kingfish" after a character in the sitcom The Amos 'n' Andy Show. Ingram started playing drums at age six. By the time he was eleven he was playing bass and then he moved to guitar. He appeared on the Rachael Ray and the Steve Harvey shows.

By the time he was fifteen, he had received offers to perform and for custom guitars. Ingram described how he explained his interest in the Blues to his childhood friends who were interested in hip hop music: "They really thought it was funny, cause it was like "Man you young but you listen to that old, sad stuff." I'm like, "Man, I ain't really like that, I'm listening more for a culture thing, you know? This is history. This birthed what you guys listen to today, because you know rap is nothing but the blues' grandchild."

By 2015, he had caught the attention of Tony Coleman, who was B. B. King's drummer. Coleman said he was playing blues the way it was supposed to be. Bootsy Collins, who had been sharing his music online, commented on how a young child can influence others.

== Career ==
=== Early career ===
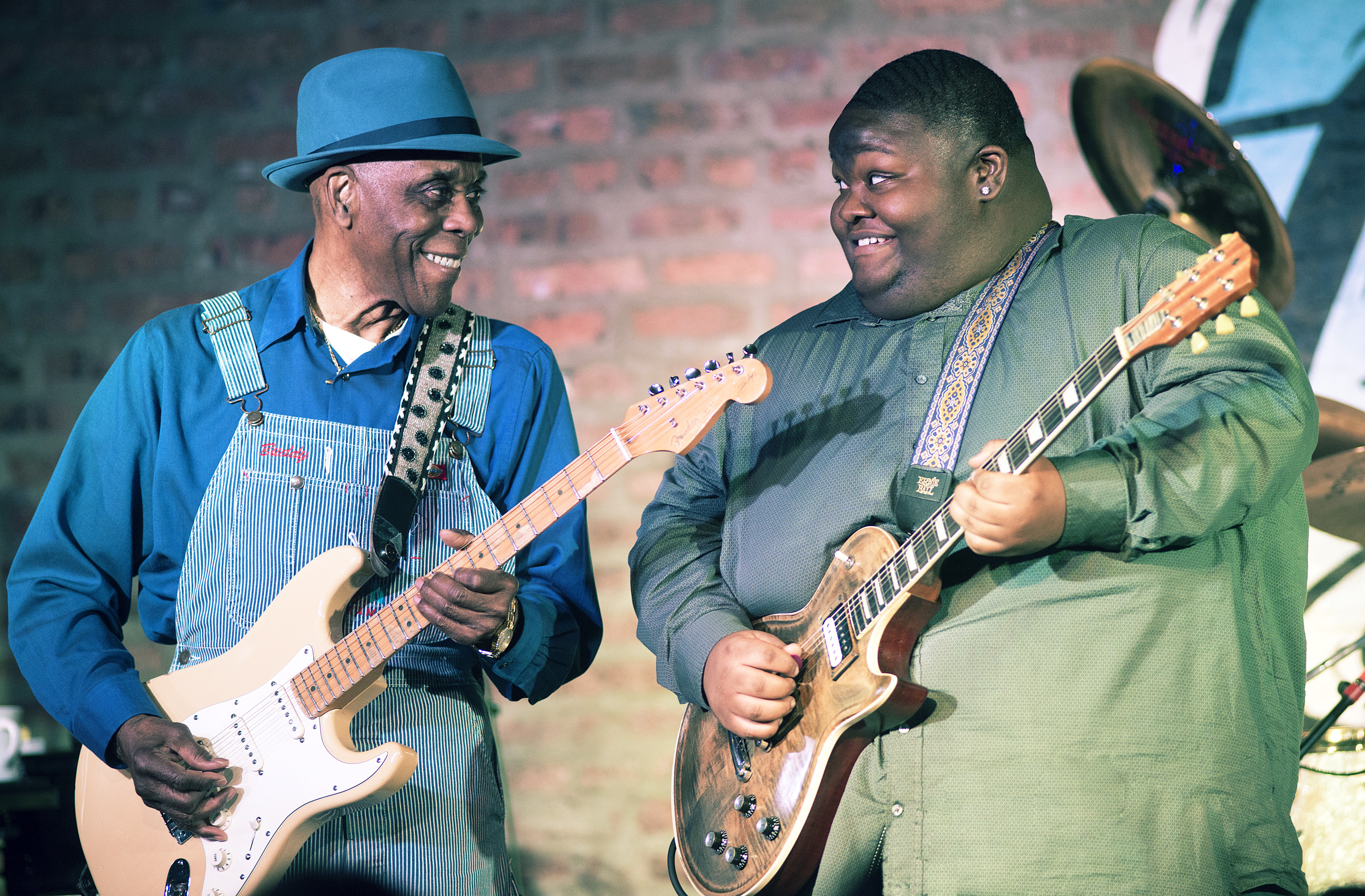
Christone "Kingfish" Ingram (right) performing with Buddy Guy, 2018

Ingram began playing gigs around his hometown while he was still in seventh grade. Not long afterwards he had acquired a local fan base. Local venues he played included Red's Lounge, Ground Zero Blues Club, the New Roxy, Shack Up Inn and the Delta Blues Room.

In November 2014, as part of the Delta Blues Museum band he performed for Michelle Obama at the White House.

In June 2017, he played at the Jackson, Mississippi Underground 119 blues club which re-opened in spring 2017, after being closed since August, 2015. The club's co-owner Michael Rejebian said the two kinds of bands you have to prepare for were show bands and party bands but with Kingfish, he was sort of the best of both worlds. In August 2017, he was headlining on the second night of the 10th St. Louis Blues Festival. The festival also included Jake Kershaw, the Chris O'Leary Band, Erin Coburn and Jim McCarty and Mystery Train. In October that year, he appeared in an episode of Jazz Night in America which also featured Terry "Harmonica" Bean and Anthony "Big A" Sherrod. Along with Gary Clark, Jr., he was a featured artist on Eric Gales' 2017 album, Middle Of The Road. In 2018 he performed at The Chicago Blues Festival.

The May 18, 2017 issue of Billboard indicated that Luke Cage creator, Cheo Hodari Coker selected Ingram along with other acts to appear in a cameo role for the season two of the series. Season 2 premiered on June 22, 2018, with Ingram appearing in episode 4, "I Get Physical", where he performed two songs "The Thrill is Gone" and "I Put A Spell On You".

In June 2018, he performed alongside hip-hop musician Rakim as part of NPR Music's Tiny Desk Concerts series, where he played "King's Paradise", "Paid in Full" and "Know the Ledge".

=== Kingfish ===
His debut album, Kingfish, was released on Alligator Records on May 17, 2019. It was produced by Grammy-winning musician Tom Hambridge at Ocean Way Studio in Nashville. Kingfish was the #1 album on The Billboard Blues Chart and the #1 Billboard Heatseeker album upon release. Billboard called Kingfish "a blues prodigy." No Depression magazine said the album was "a stunning debut from a young bluesman with an ancient soul and a large presence in the here-and-now." Kingfish was chosen as a 'Favorite Blues Album' by AllMusic. Kingfish was nominated in the category "Best Traditional Blues Album" for the 62nd Annual Grammy Awards.

NPR Music debuted Kingfish as a First Listen a week prior to release. Writer Tom Moon said, "Astounding playing ... It's almost like he's singing through the guitar."

Ingram appeared in Philadelphia at the annual Non-COMMvention on May 16, 2019. Radio station WXPN wrote, "Whether playing delicately or ferociously, Ingram's every strum is made with passion. That passion for playing was lovingly met by the crowd's passion for listening. They lingered on his every note, and gleefully anticipated the next one. Ingram stretched each of his tracks out, squeezing every last drop of possibility out of them...It sounded like it had been pulled out of the deepest pits of the Earth. Ingram possesses the unique ability to make everything he plays sound wholly natural, but entirely his own. This talent is rare, especially for a twenty-year-old." He released a video for "Outside of This Town", filmed by Lyndon Barrois. Rolling Stone called the video "trippy" and "surreal".

Ingram performed 11 dates with the rock band Vampire Weekend in August. He has previously toured with Buddy Guy.

In May 2020, Ingram was presented with five Blues Music Awards, including 'Album of the Year' for Kingfish. Two months later, he released a new single "Rock & Roll" composed by Nashville-based Sean McConnell and Ashley Ray, which he adapted as a tribute to his mother, Princess Pride, who died in the previous December.

=== 662 ===
Ingram released his second record, 662 in July 2021. Ingram is from Clarksdale, Mississippi and, says Ingram, "662 is the area code. It represents the whole north Mississippi Delta." On April 3, 2022, Ingram won the Grammy Award for Best Contemporary Blues Album for 662 at the 64th Annual Grammy Awards. In September, Fender released a custom Kingfish Telecaster Deluxe.

Ingram supported the Rolling Stones in Hyde Park, London as part of the 2022 British Summer Time concerts.

In 2023, Ingram was named as the Contemporary Blues Male Artist of the Year at the Blues Music Awards.

In October 2024, Ingram announced the launch of his new record label, Red Zero Records, in partnership with Exceleration Music. Ingram's third studio album will be the label's first project, set to be released in 2025. Ingram serves as the label's CEO, alongside his longtime manager Ric Whitney as president.

Ingram is featured on the soundtrack for Ryan Coogler's horror film Sinners, and cameos briefly in the end credits playing alongside Buddy Guy.

== Discography ==
=== Albums ===
List of albums, with selected details
Title	Details
Kingfish	Released: May 17, 2019; Formats: CD, LP, digital download, streaming; Label: Alligator Records; Blues Music Award for "Best Emerging Artist Album"; Blues Music Award for "Contemporary Blues Album"; Blues Music Award for "Album of the Year"
662	Released: July 23, 2021; Formats: CD, LP, digital download, streaming; Label: Alligator; Grammy Award for "Best Contemporary Blues Album"; Blues Music Award for "Contemporary Blues Album"
Live in London	Released: October 13, 2023; Formats: CD, LP, digital download, streaming; Label: Alligator; Recorded June 6, 2023 at The Garage; Blues Music Award for "Contemporary Blues Album"; Blues Music Award for "Album of the Year"
Hard Road	Released: September 26, 2025; Formats: CD, LP, digital download, streaming; Label: Red Zero

=== Singles ===
Title	Year	Peak chart positions	Album
Title	Year	US AAA	Album
"662"	2021	39	662
