= Army Jacket Winter =

Studio album by Jon Shain
- Released: 2007
- Recorded: Fenario Sound Recording, Chapel Hill, NC
- Length: 48:48
- Label: Flyin'
- Producer: Jon Shain, Jackson Hall, Scottsburg Jonze

Jon Shain chronology
Home Before Long (2005)	Army Jacket Winter (2007)

Army Jacket Winter is a 2007 album by Jon Shain. Accompanying Shain on the album is the Jon Shain Trio, made up of FJ Ventre, John Currie, and Bill Newton. Drummer Zeke Hutchins and jazz trumpeter Stephen Franckevich appear as guest musicians on the album. Army Jacket Winter is Shain's fifth solo album.

== Reviews ==
"Jon Shain has done it again. His latest album, Army Jacket Winter, is superb. The disc is the latest chapter in this pilgrim's progress and, yet again, his latest is his best to date... Shain's songwriting is stellar, as is his guitar work. He really has reached a level of creative excellence that guarantees his songs are consistently literate, intriguing and musically nuanced. The arrangements that underpin the tracks are uncluttered yet rich in sonic ideas that elevate the album well beyond the scope of commonplace singer-songwriter discs."
— Philip Van Vleck, The Herald-Sun

"The first song on Jon Shain’s new disc, a cover of Tom Petty’s “Time to Move On,” is a pretty fair indicator of what you get with Shain. Which is not to say Tom Petty, mind you, but a Wildflowers-era mix of fingerpick blues, gentle-yet-wry lyricism, and more than a little bit of warmth—in other words, comfy as the old G.I. castoff and thrift-store favorite referenced in the title. The sixth release on his own Flyin’ Records (named after Shain’s old duo Flyin’ Mice), Winter sees the North Carolinian moving in more of a Randy Newman direction, and frankly, it looks rather good on him. Subtle accordion, nylon-string guitar, dobro and grand piano all share in the mix with Shain’s trusty (if rusty) Silvertone acoustic here, and the result, more often than not, is golden."
— Timothy Davis, Harp Magazine (July 2007)

"Jon Shain is proof that singer/songwriters with brilliant acoustic fingerstylings and insightful lyrics are still around and going strong. Shain's Army Jacket Winter is an array of stories about love and restlessness, backed by acoustic/electric guitars, accordion and dobro. Fans of Keb Mo, Jimmy Buffett and Randy Newman will dig Shain's mood on this album."
— Kathleen Wehle, Southeast Performer Magazine, Atlanta, GA (July 2007)

== Track listing ==
1. Time to Move On – 2:43
2. Silvertone – 4:26
3. Another Month of Mondays – 2:52
4. Cornershops and Subway Trains – 3:07
5. Pictures from the Past – 3:31
6. Lucy Don't You See – 3:08
7. To Rise Again – 3:40
8. Song for Maria – 2:18
9. Song for JoJo – 3:11
10. In Real Time – 2:50
11. Dyehouse Blues – 4:50
12. Slowdance – 3:48
13. Flat Earth Crowd – 2:27
14. Throne of Gold – 5:59

All songs written by Jon Shain, except "Time to Move On" by Tom Petty.
