= Little Joe McLerran =

American singer and guitarist

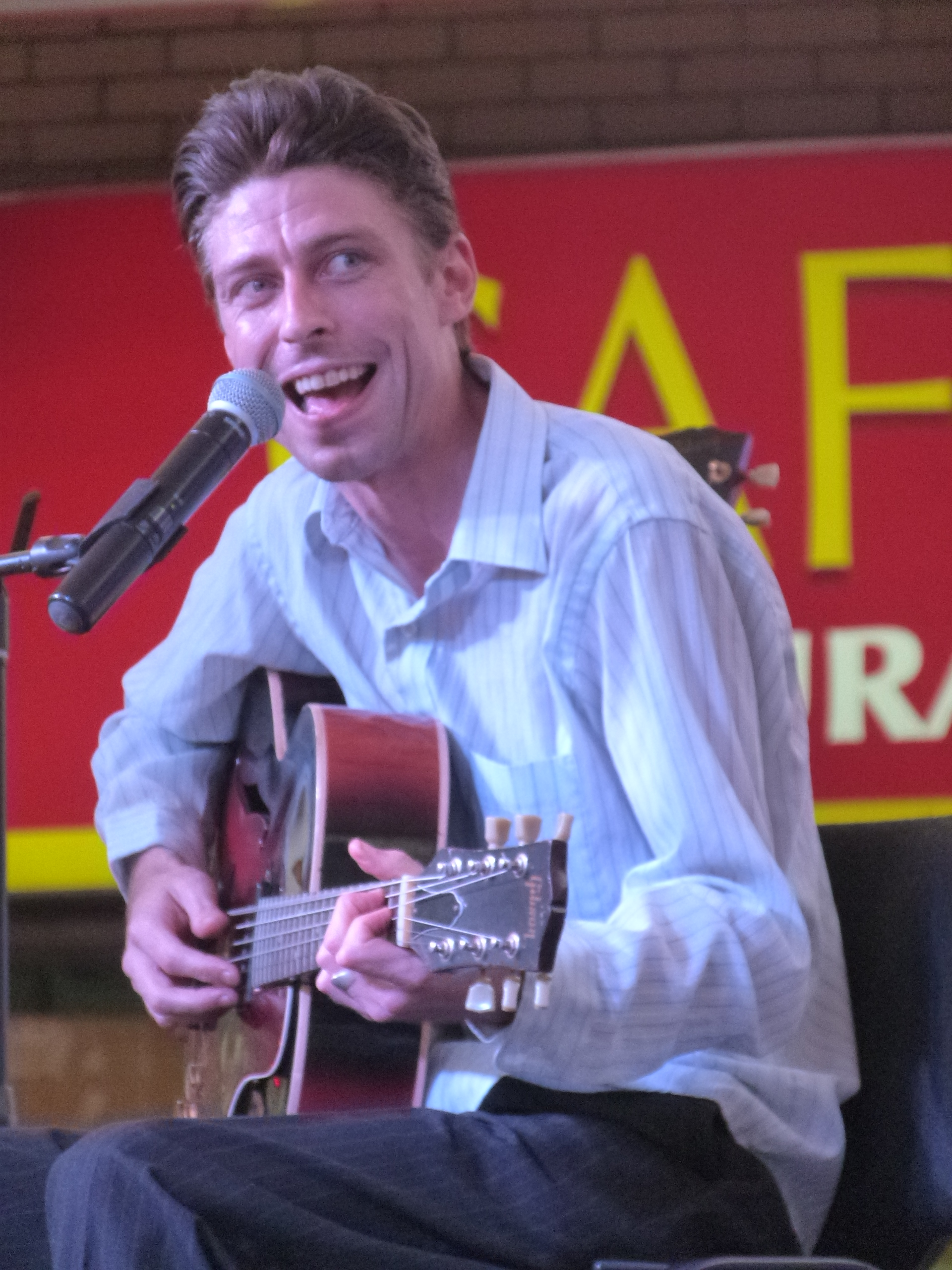
- Little Joe performing in Palmira, Colombia

Background information
- Born: Joseph R. McLerran; July 16, 1983 (age 42); Boulder, Colorado, United States
- Occupations: Traveling musician, recording artist
- Instruments: Guitar and vocals
- Years active: 1993–present
- Label: Root Blues Reborn
- Website: Official website

Joseph R. McLerran, better known as Little Joe McLerran, (born July 16, 1983) is an American blues singer and guitarist. In 2009, representing the Blues Society of Tulsa, McLerran won the International Blues Challenge Solo/Duo competition hosted by the Blues Foundation and held each year in Memphis. In 2010, McLerran teamed up with Jazz at Lincoln Center and joined the Rhythm Road taking a quartet featuring David Berntson on harmonica, Robbie Mack on bass and drummer Ron McRorey on a tour of the Middle East visiting Bahrain, Saudi Arabia, Kuwait and Oman just weeks before the onset of the Arab Spring later that same year.

== History ==
Little Joe McLerran was born in Boulder, Colorado. Joe started playing the guitar and studying the Piedmont Blues style the age of 8 and by the age of 10 he was busking on Boulder's fabled Pearl Street Mall with his younger brother Jesse on drums. They played blues songs from the masters; Big Bill Broonzy, Skip James, Tampa Red, Mississippi John Hurt and many others. The McLerran family moved to Tulsa in 1998 where Joe and Jesse continued to play old blues songs.

In 2003, during the final stages of mixing their CD Jesse died due to a fatal accident at home. As a memorial and tribute to Jesse, the Pearly Gates CD was released in 2004 as Son Piedmont and the Blues Krewe on the Roots Blues Reborn label.

In 2009, McLerran took first place at the International Blues Challenge held each year in Memphis, Tennessee by the Blues Foundation. McLerran was representing the Blues Society of Tulsa. In 2010, McLerran was selected by Jazz at Lincoln Center and the US State Department to take part in the Rhythm Road: American Music Abroad, a U.S. State Department cultural exchange program. In early 2010, McLerran traveled to the Persian Gulf region of the Middle East with his band, the Little Joe McLerran Quartet. The band visited Bahrain then crossed the causeway to Saudi Arabia where they made history performing the first public concert ever held in that nation's history. Public concerts, school workshops, concerts and private diplomatic parties at the embassies and consulates across the nation. The band then traveled to Kuwait and finished the 5-week tour in Muscat, Oman with a concert at the Crown Plaza Hotel. The tour ended just weeks before the onset of the Arab Spring as it began that year in Tunisia and Bahrain.

McLerran continues to travel for the State Department as a musical ambassador presenting educational and cultural exchange missions to the masses. On behalf of the Department of State he took his trio to the South American embassies in the countries of Paraguay in 2011 and Colombia in 2012. He took the band to the Dominican Republic in 2014.

In 2013, McLerran was inducted into the Oklahoma Jazz Hall of Fame and presented with the Legacy Tribute Award.

McLerran continues to perform at festivals, concerts and clubs across the country and around the world as a solo act and with his band.

== Discography ==
- 2004 - Son Piedmont and the Blues Krewe - RBR Records
- 2006 - The Hard Way - Hit Records
- 2007 - Live at Last Volume 1 - RBR Records
- 2009 - Believe I'll Make a Change - RBR Records
- 2012 - Facebook Blues - RBR Records
- 2018 - Little Joe McLerran and Flávio Guimarães - Blue Crawfish Records
- 2018 - Little Joe McLerran and Flávio Guimarães - Month of Sundays - Blue Crawfish Records
