= Sista Monica Parker =

American blues and gospel musical artist (1956–2014)

- Also known as: Sista Monica, The Blues Lioness
- Born: Monica C. Parker; April 27, 1956; Gary, Indiana, United States
- Died: October 9, 2014 (aged 58) Modesto, California, United States
- Genres: Electric blues, blues rock, gospel, soul
- Occupations: Singer, songwriter, record producer
- Years active: 1992–2014
- Label: Mo Muscle

Sista Monica Parker (born Monica C. Parker, April 27, 1956 – October 9, 2014) was an American electric blues, blues rock, gospel and soul singer, songwriter, and record producer.

Her influences included Al Green, Aretha Franklin, the Staple Singers, Jackie Wilson, and Sam Cooke. She wrote most of her material, and released eleven albums in her lifetime. Parker shared the stage with a number of musicians over her performing lifetime including B.B. King, India Arie, Gladys Knight, Etta James, Koko Taylor, Susan Tedeschi, Elvin Bishop, Mavis Staples and the Staple Singers, the Neville Brothers, and John Lee Hooker.

In 2015, she posthumously won a Blues Music Award in the 'Soul Blues Female Artist of the Year' category.

== Life and career ==
Born in Gary, Indiana, United States, Parker began singing in her local Baptist church at the age of seven. After college, Parker joined the United States Marine Corps and after three years of service rose the rank of sergeant. Once her military service between 1977 and 1980 ended, Parker set up a staffing company, initially based in Chicago, aimed at electrical engineering professions. After moving the business to Silicon Valley she acquired clients which included Apple Inc., Hewlett-Packard, Sun Microsystems and Yahoo!. Encouraged by her then neighbor MC Hammer, Parker started a singing career in 1992 performing regularly at Emi's Bar & Grille in Santa Cruz, California. By 1995 she released her debut album, Get Out of My Way, on her own independent record label, Mo Muscle Records. Her track "Windy City Burner" was played on the radio and it helped promote her initial touring around the US, Canada and parts of Europe. Her follow-up album, Sista Monica was released in 1997.

In 1998, Parker was nominated for a Blues Music Award and was successful in gaining a California Music Award. Her 2000 album, People Love the Blues included guest appearances from blues guitarists Jimmy Thackery and Larry McCray.

Gimme That Old Time Religion (2001) was her first gospel release, which was followed by Live in Europe the same year. The latter was recorded in Peer, Belgium. It was her performances in the late 1990s in Europe that gained her the nickname, "the Blues Lioness." In 2002 she performed at the Monterey Bay Blues Festival, but late that year was diagnosed as suffering from the rare ailment of synovial sarcoma. She was initially given three months to live. Bouts of chemotherapy, radiation and therapy ensued before she returned to the recording studio and issued Love, Soul & Spirit, Vol. 1 in 2004. Parker initiated a 40-voice choir called the Sista Monica Gospel & Inspirational Choir, a musical ensemble comprising people of various faiths.

In 2005, Can't Keep a Good Woman Down included cover versions of Willie Nelson's "Funny How Time Slips Away" and Sam Cooke's "A Change Is Gonna Come." Sweet Inspirations was issued in 2008 when Parker was again the disc's producer.

Living in the Danger Zone (2011) saw Parker include Kelley Hunt in a vocal and piano duet.

Her festival and other event appearances included the San Francisco Blues Festival (1995 and 1997), Monterey Jazz Festival (1998), Notodden Blues Festival (1999), Edmonton's Labatt Blues Festival (2004), and Blue Bear Live II (2007).

== Awards and nominations ==
Parker was the Santa Cruz County Artist of the Year in 2005, and winner of the Gail Rich Award for excellence in the arts in 2000. She was dubbed 'Best Blues Artist' at the California Music Awards in 1998, and was nominated for the 'Best Soul Blues Female Artist' at the Blues Music Awards in 2007, 2008, 2010 and 2012. In 2015, she posthumously won a Blues Music Award as the 'Soul Blues Female Artist of the Year'.

== Death ==
Parker died from lung cancer in Kaiser Permanente Hospital in Modesto, California, on October 9, 2014. She was 58.

== Discography ==
=== Albums ===
Year	Title	Record label
1995	Get Out of My Way	Mo Muscle Records
1997	Sista Monica	Mo Muscle Records
2000	People Love the Blues	Mo Muscle Records
2001	Give Me That Old Time Religion	Mo Muscle Records
2001	Live in Europe	Mo Muscle Records
2004	Love, Soul & Spirit, Vol. 1	Mo Muscle Records
2005	Can't Keep a Good Woman Down	Mo Muscle Records
2008	Sweet Inspirations	Mo Muscle Records
2010	Singing in the Spirit	Mo Muscle Records
2011	Living in the Danger Zone	Mo Muscle Records
2012	Soul Blues & Ballads	Mo Muscle Records
