= Zac Harmon =

American songwriter

William Zach "Zac" Harmon is an American blues musician from Jackson, Mississippi, United States. Harmon was signed to Toronto's NorthernBlues Music until 2015, when he announced his signing to San Francisco–based Blind Pig Records.

== Biography ==
While in high school and college, Harmon played guitar for blues musicians Z. Z. Hill, Dorothy Moore, and Sam Myers. He moved to Los Angeles, California, in the 1980s in pursuit of a career in the music industry. He worked as a studio musician, and later, built himself to become a writer/producer. Harmon produced tracks for Black Uhuru's album The Mystical Truth, which also received a Grammy nomination in 1994, as well as crafting songs for The O'Jays, The Whispers, Karyn White, and Alexander O'Neal. Compelled by his dream of recording his own blues record, he created his first solo work, Live at Babe and Ricky's Inn, in 2002.

Harmon (and the Mid South Blues Revue) won the 2004 International Blues Challenge for Best Unsigned Blues Band, sponsored by the Southern California Blues Society of Los Angeles. In 2005, XM Satellite Radio listeners voted Harmon the Best New Blues Artist in the XM Nation Awards, and in 2006, he was awarded the Blues Music Award for Best New Artist Debut for his album, The Blues According to Zacariah.

In 2010, Harmon performed at the "Mississippi Celebrates its GRAMMY Legacy" event, hosted by Haley Barbour, where he was presented with a Peavey Award.

Harmon made his Edinburgh Jazz & Blues Festival debut on 12 July 2019. He was granted another Blues Music Award in 2022, when his album Long As I Got My Guitar, was deemed to be "Soul Blues Album of the Year".

== Discography ==
- Live at Babe and Ricky's Inn (2002)
- The Blues According To Zacariah (2005)
- Shot in the Kill Zone (2008)
- From the Root (2009)
- Music is Medicine (2012)
- Right Man, Right Now (2015)
- Mississippi BarBQ (2019)
- Long As I Got My Guitar (2021)

== Filmography ==
- Black and Blue (2009)
