= Piper and the Hard Times =

American blues band

Piper & the Hard Times is an American blues rock band based in Nashville, Tennessee. The band consists of Al "Piper" Green (lead vocals), Steve Eagon (guitar), Dave Colella (drums), Amy Frederick (keyboard) and Parker Hawkins (bass).

The band was the 2024 winner in the Best Band category of the International Blues Challenge, a global competition held annually in Memphis, Tennessee.

Their 2024 album, Revelation, debuted at number one on the Billboard Magazine's Top Blues Albums chart.

During its 2024 tour the band joined with other notable blues artists at the Telluride Blues and Brews Festival.

== Personnel ==
- Al “Piper” Green – vocals
- Steve Eagon – guitar
- Dave Colella – drums
- Amy Frederick – keyboard
- Parker Hawkins – bass
- Producer - Tres Sasser

== Discography ==
=== Revelation (2024) ===
Revelation track listing
No.	Title	Length
1.	"Trouble Man"	4:50
2.	"The Hard Times"	4:39
3.	"Heart For Sale"	3:43
4.	"Preacher Blues"	5:05
5.	"Revelation"	3:35
6.	"Working Farm Blues"	3:06
7.	"Crave You"	4:26
8.	"Come Back Knockin'"	3:04
9.	"Why Not Me"	4:13
10.	"You're Gonna Miss Me"	5:28
11.	"Walk With Me"	4:18
12.	"Twenty Long Years"	5:06
Total length:		51:33

==== Critical reception ====
Writing for Blues Blast magazine, John Sacksteder wrote, "Piper and the Hard Times is certainly a Revelation both on the record and as a very entertaining live act. Piper’s vocals are a powerful, deep growl. The band is always tight and are consummate professionals."

The Nashville Scene called Revelation "a searing, musically delightful portrait that includes everything that makes Piper & the Hard Times special. They come across as a contemporary group steeped in and fortified by the blues, yet easily able to incorporate elements of rock, jazz, soul, pop and gospel into their blend."

Living Blues magazine wrote, "Revelation makes for a stunning encounter, a sturdy combination of barnstorming blues and emphatic expression."

In 2025, Revelation was named as the 'Best Emerging Artist Album' at the Blues Music Awards.
