= List of blue-eyed soul artists =

This is a list of notable blue-eyed soul artists. Blue-eyed soul (also known as white soul) is soul music or rhythm and blues performed by white artists.

== A ==
- Adele
- Christina Aguilera
- Anastacia
- The Animals
- Rick Astley
- Atlanta Rhythm Section
- Atomic Rooster
- Average White Band

== B ==
- Jon B.
- Len Barry
- Bee Gees
- Cliff Bennett and the Rebel Rousers
- Blue Zone
- Michael Bolton
- David Bowie
- The Box Tops
- Boy George
- Tim Buckley

== C ==
- Bobby Caldwell
- Lewis Capaldi
- Paul Carrack
- Alex Chilton
- Gabriella Cilmi
- Eric Clapton
- Chris Clark
- Wayne Cochran
- Joe Cocker
- Harry Connick, Jr.
- The Commitments
- Culture Club

== D ==
- Taylor Dayne
- Bill Deal
- Dion
- The Doobie Brothers
- Duffy

== F ==
- Chris Farlowe
- The Flaming Ember
- John Fred

== G ==
- Go West
- Jon Gibson

== H ==
- Hall & Oates
- Roy Head
- Taylor Hicks

== J ==
- Elton John
- Janis Joplin
- Tom Jones

== K ==
- Kokomo
- KC and the Sunshine Band

== L ==
- Amos Lee
- Ivy Levan
- Kenny Loggins
- Lulu
- Shelby Lynne

== M ==
- Lonnie Mack
- Teena Marie
- Maroon 5
- Michael McDonald
- George Michael
- Jason Mraz
- Van Morrison

== N ==
- John Németh
- Paolo Nutini
- Nathaniel Rateliff and the Night Sweats
- Laura Nyro

== O ==
- Oktobar 1864

== P ==
- Robert Palmer
- Player
- Elvis Presley

== R ==
- Rag'n'Bone Man
- Rare Earth
- The Rascals
- Conner Reeves
- The Righteous Brothers
- Johnny Rivers
- Todd Rundgren
- Mitch Ryder

== S ==
- Evie Sands
- Boz Scaggs
- Simply Red
- Sam Smith
- Steely Dan
- The Soul Survivors
- The Spencer Davis Group
- Dusty Springfield
- Rod Stewart
- Joss Stone

== T ==
- Robin Thicke
- Three Dog Night
- Justin Timberlake

== W ==
- ZZ Ward
- Tony Joe White
- Amy Winehouse
- Wild Cherry
- Steve Winwood

== Y ==
- Paul Young
