= Bonnie Hayes =

American singer-songwriter

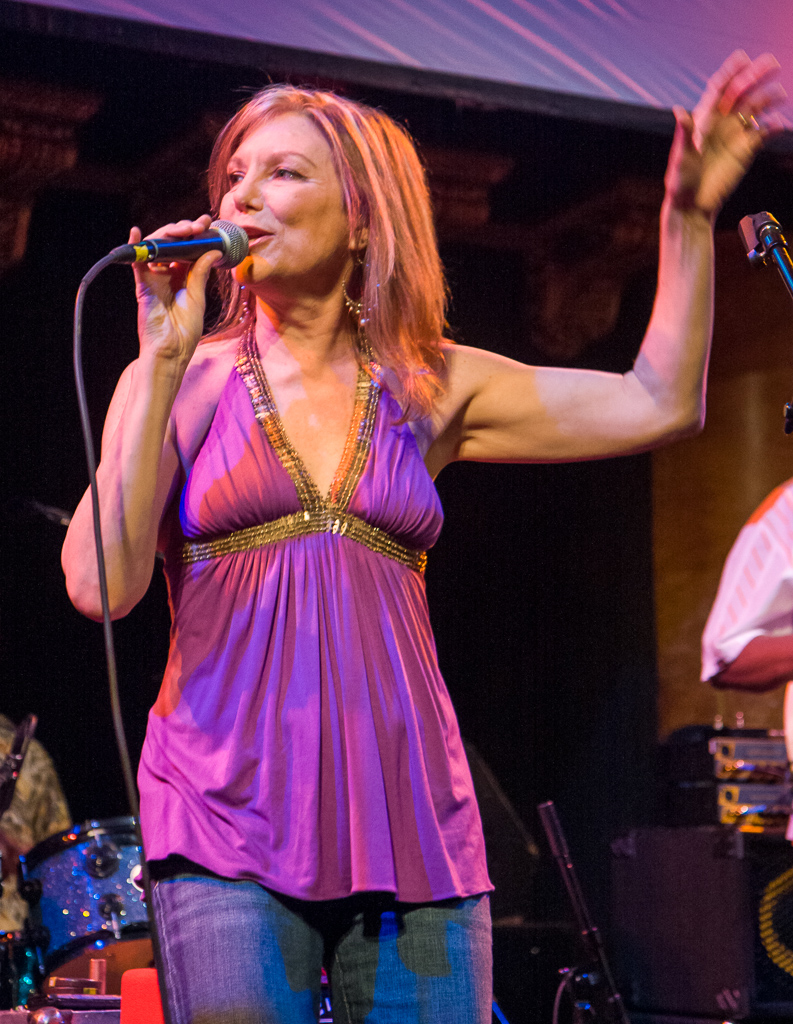

Background information
- Origin: San Francisco, California, US
- Genres: Rock, new wave
- Years active: 1982–present
- Labels: Slash Records, EMI, Beacon, Bondage Records
- Website: Official site

Bonnie Hayes is an American singer-songwriter, musician and record producer, born in San Francisco, California, United States, and currently lives between Los Angeles and New York City. Her songs have been recorded by Cher, Bette Midler, Bonnie Raitt, Natalie Cole, Robert Cray, David Crosby, Adam Ant and Booker T and the MGs.

== Early life and education ==
Hayes is the eldest of seven children and she attended Washington High School and San Francisco State University. Her brother, Chris Hayes, was the lead guitarist for Huey Lewis and the News, and another brother, Kevin, was the drummer with the Robert Cray Band. Her family moved to San Francisco from the San Joaquin Valley in 1970 and Hayes joined the jazz fusion band Sweetmeat, and taught piano and music theory at Blue Bear School of Music.

== Career ==
In the early 1980s, Hayes founded the new wave band The Punts, and released the single, "Shelly's Boyfriend". In 1982, the band was signed by Slash Records and changed the name to Bonnie Hayes with the Wild Combo. A song from the album Good Clean Fun called "Girls Like Me" appeared in the 1983 movie, Valley Girl. Her album, Brave New Girl was released on Bondage Records. Hayes and her band toured as the opening act for Huey Lewis and the News, whose lead guitarist, Chris Hayes, was her younger brother. After being signed by Huey Lewis and the News's publishing company, Hayes signed with Chrysalis Records and in 1987 released the album, Bonnie Hayes. "Some Guys", the first single from the record, was later recorded by Cher.

In 1988, Hayes signed with Muscle Records and Miles Copeland. She recorded an album that was never released. Later that year, she became a member of Belinda Carlisle's band for her world tour. In 1989, Bonnie Raitt recorded Hayes' songs, "Love Letter" and "Have a Heart", for her Nick of Time album. "Have a Heart" was the top-charting song on the album, rising to number 3 on the Adult Contemporary chart. In 1991, Hayes joined Billy Idol on tour for almost two years in support of his record Charmed Life. In 1996, Hayes was signed to Fuel Records and recorded the album, Empty Sky. One song from the album, "Bottomless", was previously recorded by Bette Midler.

In 2004, Hayes released Love in the Ruins, written after she had learned to play the guitar. She has taught at the Berklee College of Music, the Stanford Jazz Workshop, the REO Songwriting Retreat outside of Vancouver B.C, the ASCAP workshops in Los Angeles, and at the WCS Conference at Foothill College. In 2013, Hayes became chair of the songwriting department at Berklee in Boston. In 2022, she returned to the Bay Area to found a youth All Star Songwriting Program at Blue Bear School of Music.

== Reception ==
A reviewer at AllMusic wrote that Hayes' album, Good Clean Fun, is "probably the finest album of the entire early-'80s California girl pop scene" and "a neglected '80s pop masterpiece." The rock music critic Robert Christgau said that on that album Hayes "comes off smarter, surer, and more sisterly than just about any new rock and roll woman I can think of."

== Albums ==
Good Clean Fun

Studio album by Bonnie Hayes with the Wild Combo
- Released: 1982
- Genre: Pop rock, new wave
- Label: Slash Records

=== Good Clean Fun (1982) ===
This album was released on CD on September 18, 2007.

- Label: Slash Records
- Label record ID: SR-112

==== Track listing ====
1. "Girls Like Me" (B. Hayes)
2. "Shelly's Boyfriend" (B. Hayes/Steve Savage)
3. "Separating" (B. Hayes/Savage)
4. "Dum Fun" (B. Hayes/Savage)
5. "Coverage (B. Hayes)
6. "Inside Doubt" (B. Hayes/Savage)
7. "Joyride (B. Hayes)
8. "Loverboy (B. Hayes)
9. "Raylene" (B. Hayes)
10. "The Last Word" (B. Hayes)

==== Reviews ====
Professional ratings
Review scores
Source	Rating
Allmusic	link
Robert Christgau	A− link

=== Brave New Girl (1984) ===
(With the Wild Combo)

==== Track listing ====
1. "Brave New Girl" (B. Hayes, S. Savage)
2. "Incommunicado" (B.Hayes, S. Savage)
3. "After Hours" (B. Hayes, S. Savage)
4. "Wild Heart" (B. Hayes, S. Savage, P. Davis)
5. "Maria" (B. Hayes, S. Savage)
6. "Night Baseball" (B. Hayes, P. Davis)

=== Bonnie Hayes (1987) ===
- Label: EMI Distribution
- ASIN: B00000EEA9

Track Listing

1. "Some Guys" (Golde, Hayes) 3:40
2. "To See You Again" (Davis, Golde, Hayes, Sitkin) 2:59
3. "The Real Thing" (Hayes) 3:46
4. "Coax Me, Chad" (Golde, Hayes) 4:04
5. "Time Stands Still" (Hayes) 5:36
6. "Soul Love" (Hayes, Hayes, Rietveld) 4:17
7. "Skeletons Dancing" (Safan) 4:42
8. "Chance on You" (Hayes) 3:45
9. "Whole Wide World" (Davis, Hayes) 3:51
10. "Joyful Noise" (Hayes) 4:23

=== Empty Sky (1996) ===
- Label: Beacon
- ASIN: B00000DPGU

Track Listing

1. "My Brave Face"
2. "Hieroglyphics"
3. "Too Far to Fall"
4. "Things You Left Behind"
5. "Ode to Billie Joe"
6. "Love Letter"
7. "Out of the Loop"
8. "Learning to Fly"
9. "Bottomless"
10. "Freedom Calling"
11. "The Moment of True Feeling"
12. "Bed of Roses"

=== Love In the Ruins (2003) ===
- Label: Bondage Records
- ASIN: B00008US5V

==== Track listing ====
1. "Beautiful Ideal"
2. "I Can't Stop"
3. "Greener Grass"
4. "Keeping the Hum Going"
5. "Still Wild"
6. "Stealing Roses"
7. "Everybody Wins"
8. "Turn Down Love"
9. "Vintage People"
10. "Money Makes You Stupid"
