= John Németh =

American songwriter (born 1975

- Born: March 10, 1975 (age 51); Boise, Idaho, U.S.
- Origin: San Francisco, Memphis, Tennessee
- Genres: Electric blues; blue-eyed soul
- Occupations: Harmonicist; singer; songwriter; producer
- Instruments: Harmonica; vocals
- Years active: Early 1990s–present
- Labels: Blind Pig Records; Blue Corn Music; Memphis Grease; Nola Blue Records
- Website: johnnemeth.com

John Németh (born March 10, 1975) is an American electric blues and soul harmonicist, singer, and songwriter. He has received five Blues Music Awards for Soul Blues Male Artist, Soul Blues Album, Traditional Blues Album of the Year, Instrumentalist – Vocals and Instrumentalist – Harmonica. He has recorded 10 albums since 2002 and backed Junior Watson, Anson Funderburgh, and Elvin Bishop. He has opened for Robert Cray, Keb' Mo', and Earl Thomas.

AllMusic says that he is a "vocalist with great range, ability, and soulfulness (and) Németh had also developed into a top-notch blues harmonica player." In 2013 alone, he was nominated five times for a Blues Music Award, with nine nominations overall.

== Early life and education ==
Németh was born in Boise, Idaho. After singing at his local church, he played in local groups in his teenage years, and later formed Fat John & the 3 Slims with his friend Tom Moore. He regularly toured and performed working between five to seven nights a week for almost a decade.

== Career ==
By 2000, Németh was backing Junior Watson and separately fronting his own band known as The Jacks. In 2002, Németh self-published the album, The Jack of Harps. His debut solo effort, Come and Get It, followed in 2004. Also in 2004, he moved to Oakland, California. Gaining more experience, he temporarily replaced Sam Myers in Anson Funderburgh's backing band in 2005 and 2006.

In 2006, he signed a recording contract with Blind Pig Records. Magic Touch, which was produced by Funderburgh and had Watson as a guest musician on several tracks, came out in 2007. Living Blues said "Magic Touch gives hope that the blues will survive." Németh was nominated for a Blues Music Award in the 'Best New Artist Debut' category for the album. He appeared on Elvin Bishop's The Blues Roles On album (2008), which was nominated for a Grammy Award in the Best Traditional Blues Album category. Németh performed at the Blue Bear Live III concert on May 9, 2008 at the Great American Music Hall in San Francisco to benefit the Blue Bear School of Music in the city. Németh's release, Love Me Tonight (2009), reached No. 6 in the Billboard Top Blues Albums Chart.

Németh's fourth solo release, Name the Day!, was released in 2010. It equaled the achievement of Love Me Tonight and peaked at No. 6 in the Billboard Top Blues Albums Chart. Blues Live was recorded in February 2012 at three venues in the San Francisco Bay Area; it included guitar contributions from Kid Andersen. Soul Live was released in September 2012. In 2020, Németh signed with Nola Blue Records. His album, Stronger Than Strong, was released on October 16, 2020.

== Accolades ==
In 2013, Németh was nominated in five categories for a Blues Music Award including 'B.B. King Entertainer', 'Contemporary Blues Album', 'Instrumentalist – Harmonica', 'Soul Blues Album', and 'Soul Blues Male Artist'. He performed at the Great Lakes Blues Society in April; the Simi Valley Cajun & Blues Music Festival in May; and the Jackson Rhythm and Blues Festival in August 2013. He moved to Memphis, Tennessee in early 2013 and said that the Bo-Keys would back him on his next recording. In 2014, he won a Blues Music Award in the 'Soul Blues Male Artist of the Year' category. He was nominated again in the 'B.B. King Entertainer' category for the 42nd Blues Music Awards, scheduled to take place on June 6, 2021. In 2023, Nemeth won the 'Instrumentalist – Harmonica' category at the Blues Music Awards, alongside May Be the Last Time being named the 'Traditional Blues Album of the Year'.

== Discography ==
Year	Title	Record label
2002	The Jack of Harps; John Németh and the Jacks	Self published
2004	Come and Get It	Self published
2007	Magic Touch	Blind Pig Records
2009	Love Me Tonight	Blind Pig
2010	Name the Day!	Blind Pig
2012	Soul Live	CD Baby
2012	Blues Live	CD Baby
2014	Memphis Grease	Blue Corn Music
2017	Feelin' Freaky	Memphis Grease
2020	Stronger Than Strong	Nola Blue Records
2022	May Be the Last Time	Nola Blue
2023	Live From the Fallout Shelter	Nola Blue

== See also ==
- List of electric blues musicians
- List of harmonica blues musicians
- List of blue-eyed soul artists
- List of harmonicists
