= Blue Bear School of Music =

Coordinates: 37°48′24″N 122°25′50″W

Blue Bear School of Music is a nonprofit organization founded in San Francisco, California in 1971. Blue Bear has trained over 25,000 students in voice, acoustic guitar, electric guitar, piano, bass, drums, horns, songwriting, bands and ensembles. The school currently has more than 1,700 members annually enrolled in small group classes, band workshops, and private lessons. Blue Bear also offers numerous music programs for disadvantaged youth throughout the year.

Past celebrity sponsors have included Blackalicious, Charles Brown, Cake, Tracy Chapman, Les Claypool, The Doobie Brothers, Green Day, John Lee Hooker, Metallica, Rancid, Carlos Santana and The Donnas.

== History ==
Blue Bear School of Music was founded as "Blue Bear Waltzes School of Genuine Music" in the summer of 1971 by a rock band called "Wolfgang & Strauss." Before moving to San Francisco they lived in Northern California on the Bear River. For a period in the mid-1970s, when the founding members moved on, Blue Bear was run by a co-operative of teachers and students.

In 1978, operations moved from the original storefront on Ocean Avenue to Fort Mason Center.

== Programs ==
Blue Bear offers a number of programs for underserved youth which provide music education in the schools, in addition to underwritten summer programs at Blue Bear and youth centers, as well as sliding scale tuition programs for youth and adult students.

In April 2007 five Blue Bear-affiliated artists and groups provided artistic services to the Project Homeless Connect event held at Bill Graham Auditorium. In February 2009 Blue Bear was presented with a Certificate of Honor by the San Francisco Board of Supervisors, which commended the organization for its ongoing efforts in bringing quality, affordable music education to diverse communities throughout San Francisco.

Blue Bear opened a satellite campus in Mission Bay, SF in September of 2023 and added another SF location in the inner Sunset in February of 2025.

== Faculty ==
Blue Bear's teachers are experienced educators and professional musicians who have played with, taught and/or written for numerous artists including Bonnie Raitt, Metallica, Huey Lewis and the News, Third Eye Blind, Carlos Santana, The Tubes, Billy Idol, Norah Jones, Counting Crows, Belinda Carlyle, The Sons of Champlin, Albert Collins, Charlie Musselwhite and Bobby McFerrin.

Current Blue Bear faculty includes GRAMMY-nominated, platinum-selling songwriter, producer and musician Bonnie Hayes and noted Bay Area vocal coach and producer Raz Kennedy (formerly with Bobby McFerrin's Voicestra).

== Annual benefit concert ==
Each year Blue Bear presents a benefit concert that raises funds for the school's youth music education programs.

In February 2006, Blue Bear held its first annual Music for Youth Benefit, BLUE BEAR LIVE I at The Independent in San Francisco. Blues guitar virtuoso Robben Ford headlined the sold-out event. Joining Robben on stage was Blue Bear alum, faculty member and Grammy nominated singer-songwriter Bonnie Hayes and her band. Special guests included Vicki Randle from The Tonight Show Band, and guitarist, Blue Bear alum and guest faculty member Tal Morris of Creedence Clearwater Revisited.

BLUE BEAR LIVE II took place on May 12, 2007, at The Great American Music Hall. Rock and Roll Hall of Famer and Grammy Lifetime Achievement Award recipient Booker T. Jones was the featured headline artist. Returning from BLUE BEAR LIVE II, Bonnie Hayes and Vicki Randle were joined on stage with guest vocalists Sista Monica Parker, Amber Morris and Larry Batiste.

BLUE BEAR LIVE III took place on May 9, 2008, at The Great American Music Hall. Blues guitar legend Elvin Bishop was the headline artist, and was joined by Tommy Castro, Bonnie Hayes, John Németh, Vicki Randle, Mighty Mike Schermer, André Thierry and R.C. Carriere, along with Blue Bear students, staff, and faculty.

BLUE BEAR LIVE IV took place on March 26, 2009, at Bimbo's 365 Club. Los Lobos was the headline band, joined by Jackie Greene, Elvin Bishop, and Blue Bear-affiliated student bands, The Korks from Rooftop School, Obstruction of Justice and Chrome Potato from James Lick Middle School, and Know Clue.

BLUE BEAR LIVE V took place on May 14, 2010, at Bimbo's 365 Club. The headline act was Trombone Shorty, joined by Zigaboo Modeliste and Ivan Neville. Blue Bear-affiliated student bands also performed.

BLUE BEAR LIVE VI took place on May 20, 2011, at Bimbo's 365 Club. The headline act was The Funky Meters. Blue Bear-affiliated student bands also performed.

The Blue Bear 40th Anniversary Concert took place on March 22, 2012, at Bimbo's 365 Club. The headline act was Jackie Greene. Blue Bear-affiliated student bands also performed.

== Mission statement ==
Blue Bear School of Music's mission statement is "to provide superior quality and affordable popular music education to aspiring musicians of all ages and skill levels within a supportive and encouraging community."
