= Hard Road (Christone Ingram album) =

Studio album by Christone "Kingfish" Ingram
- Released: September 26, 2025
- Genre: Blues
- Length: 42:46
- Label: Red Zero

Christone "Kingfish" Ingram chronology
| Live in London (2023) | Hard Road (2025) |

Hard Road is an album by blues guitarist and singer Christone "Kingfish" Ingram. His third studio album, and fourth album overall, it was released on his own Red Zero record label on September 26, 2025.

Kingfish wrote or co-wrote all the songs on the album. Five of the tracks were produced by Tom Hambridge in Nashville, four were produced by Patrick "GuitarBoy" Hayes in Los Angeles, and two were produced by Nick Goldston in Memphis, with each producer using different sets of musicians for the recording sessions.

Hard Road was nominated for a Grammy Award for Best Contemporary Blues Album.

== Critical reception ==
In Glide Magazine, Jim Hynes wrote, "The rapid rush to fame was a lot to absorb for this once child prodigy, and this album represents considerable self-reflection. Said another way, it’s about maturation. His guitar still does plenty of talking, but we hear his true voice more than previously. Interestingly, his immense sound is remarkably toned down somewhat in the process..."

In Blues Rock Review, Bob Liddycoat said, "This album definitely demonstrates a growth in maturity and impressive versatility. Ingram has been described as embracing genres – funk, soul, hip-hop, pop, and jazz – and with this album, he seamlessly crosses their boundaries with ease and remarkable acuity. There’s increased focus on his vocal ability but there’s still plenty here for those hooked on his towering guitar wizardry."

In Louder than War, Ian Corbridge wrote, "Not content with continuing just where he left off, Kingfish has clearly absorbed so much more from his relatively short time on planet earth as he expands his sonic repertoire still further, blending traditional delta blues with funk, soul, pop, rock and jazz, once again reinventing a classic genre of music with his own trademark style."

== Track listing ==
| No. | Title | Writer(s) | Producer(s) | Length |
|---|---|---|---|---|
| 1. | "Truth" | Christone Ingram, Tom Hambridge | Tom Hambridge | 2:34 |
| 2. | "Bad Like Me" | Carl Lois, Nick Goldston, Christone Ingram | Nick Goldston | 3:33 |
| 3. | "S.S.S." | Patrick Hayes, Justin Carder, Christone Ingram, Frank Lilmil Robinson | Patrick "GuitarBoy" Hayes, Christone "Kingfish" Ingram | 3:57 |
| 4. | "Nothin' but Your Love" | Dylan V. Altman, Steve Rusch, Carl Lois, Christone Ingram, Tyrone Carreker | Nick Goldston | 3:55 |
| 5. | "Crosses" | Christone Ingram, Tom Hambridge, Richard Fleming | Tom Hambridge | 5:02 |
| 6. | "Voodoo Charm" | Christone Ingram, Tom Hambridge, Richard Fleming | Tom Hambridge | 3:47 |
| 7. | "Back to L.A." | Christone Ingram, Tom Hambridge | Tom Hambridge | 3:26 |
| 8. | "Clearly" | Christone Ingram | Christone "Kingfish" Ingram, Patrick "GuitarBoy" Hayes | 5:17 |
| 9. | "Standing on Business" | Christone Ingram, Patrick Hayes, Frank Limil Robinson | Christone "Kingfish" Ingram, Patrick "GuitarBoy" Hayes | 3:56 |
| 10. | "Hard to Love" | Christone Ingram, Patrick Hayes, Matthias Lattin | Patrick "GuitarBoy" Hayes, Christone "Kingfish" Ingram | 4:32 |
| 11. | "Memphis" | Christone Ingram, Tom Hambridge, Richard Fleming | Tom Hambridge | 2:46 |

== Personnel ==
Musicians

- Christone "Kingfish" Ingram – guitar, vocals
- James "Jbrab" Brabham – B4 organ
- Harrell "Red" Davenport – harmonica
- Nick Goldston – bass, keyboard, drums, guitar, background vocals
- Kenny Greenberg – guitar
- Sarah & Rachel Hambridge – background vocals
- Tom Hambridge – drums, chimes, background vocals
- Patrick "GuitarBoy" Hayes – guitar, bass, drums, Fender Rhodes piano
- Joseph Knox Jr. – drums
- Tommy Macdonald – bass
- Kendall Nesbitt – piano, keyboards
- CJ Ramsey III – organ, Fender Rhodes piano
- Marty Sammon – Hammond B3 organ
- Tim "88karats" Tyler – bass
- Glenn Worf – bass

Production

- Produced by Tom Hambridge, Patrick "GuitarBoy" Hayes, Nick Goldston, Christone "Kingfish" Ingram
- Executive producers: Christone Ingram, Ric Whitney
- Engineering: Zach Allen, Lowell Reynolds, Michael Saint-Leon, Liam Weiland, Patrick "GuitarBoy" Hayes, Chad Benning, Nick Goldston, Lawrence "Boo" Mitchell
