= Kingfish (Christone Ingram album) =

Studio album by Christone "Kingfish" Ingram
- Released: May 17, 2019
- Studio: Ocean Way, Nashville
- Genre: Blues
- Label: Alligator
- Producer: Tom Hambridge

Christone "Kingfish" Ingram chronology
Kingfish (2019)	662 (2021)

Kingfish is an album by blues guitarist and singer Christone "Kingfish" Ingram. His first album, it was released on May 17, 2019, in CD, LP, and digital formats.

For the 2020 Grammys, Kingfish was nominated for a Grammy Award for Best Traditional Blues Album.

== Critical reception ==
On AllMusic, Thom Jurek wrote, "At the ripe old age of 20, Clarksdale, Mississippi guitar slinger Christone "Kingfish" Ingram has been anointed "the next explosion of the blues," by no less than Buddy Guy. The proclamation is accurate.... The bottom line is that Ingram arrives fully formed as an already authoritative presence on Kingfish, all revved up and ready to. This is as promising as a debut album gets."

On NPR, Tom Moon said, "This emphasis on crisp execution makes literally every Ingram solo on the album a dramatic event. On the up-tempo stuff, he tears through blistering lines with the easygoing assurance of a road-dog veteran. Then when it's slow-blues time, he makes the guitar moan..."

In Blues Blast Magazine, Steve Jones wrote, "Many of the live shows and songs I’ve seen Kingfish do are really wild and have some over the top guitar here and there. The work here is much more restrained and yet is equally enjoyable (if not better).... It really is a great CD and Kingfish Ingram really has grown up to become a superb bluesman. I recommend this one highly!"

== Track listing ==
No.	Title	Writer(s)	Length
1.	"Outside of This Town"	Tom Hambridge; Christone Ingram	4:08
2.	"Fresh Out" (featuring Buddy Guy)	Hambridge; Richard Fleming	3:48
3.	"It Ain't Right"	Hambridge; Kingfish	3:05
4.	"Been Here Before"	Hambridge; Kingfish	5:54
5.	"If You Love Me"	Ingram; Jontavious Willis	4:03
6.	"Love Ain't My Favorite Word"	Hambridge; Kingfish	5:25
7.	"Listen" (featuring Keb' Mo')	Hambridge; Kingfish	5:29
8.	"Before I'm Old"	Hambridge; Fleming	4:15
9.	"Believe These Blues"	Hambridge; Fleming	4:25
10.	"Trouble"	Hambridge; Kingfish	2:55
11.	"Hard Times"	Hambridge; Fleming	3:09
12.	"That's Fine By Me"	Hambridge; Kingfish	4:43

== Personnel ==
Musicians

- Christone "Kingfish" Ingram – guitar, vocals
- Chris Black – drums
- Billy Branch – harmonica
- Buddy Guy – guitar, vocals
- Tom Hambridge – drums, percussion, tambourine, background vocals
- Keb' Mo' – guitar, acoustic guitar, vocals
- Tommy MacDonald – bass
- Bob McNelley – guitar
- Marty Sammon – piano, Hammond B3 organ

Production

- Produced by Tom Hambridge
- Engineering: Zach Allen
- Assistant engineering: Austin Atwood, Cameron Moulton, Justin Bennington
- Mixing, mastering: Tom Hambridge, Michael Saint-Leon
- Additional recording: Blaise Barton, Zach Allen, Michael Saint-Leon
- Photos: Rory Doyle
- Packaging design: Kevin Niemiec
