= Castro Coleman =

American singer (born 1976)

Castro Coleman (born August 25, 1976), known professionally as Mr. Sipp, is an American blues and gospel singer, musician and songwriter. Mr. Sipp is the 2014 International Blues Challenge winner by way of The Vicksburg Blues Society as well as the 2014 Gibson Best Guitarist Award Winner. The same year, Castro was given the Bobby Rush Entertainer of the Year Award by the Jus' Blues Foundation. In 2015, he won several Jackson Music Awards including International Male Blues Artist, Blues Artist of the Year, and Entertainer of the Year.

== Biography ==
Castro Coleman was born in McComb, Mississippi, United States, to Jonell and the late Vera Coleman. He is a husband and father of four daughters. He has been around music all of his life. His parents and aunt had a quartet group. He was influenced by B.B. King at the age of six, which is when he started playing the guitar.

Coleman started out playing the gospel with The Legendary Williams Brothers, The Canton Spirituals and The Pilgrim Jubilees. He later started his own group The True Believers which launched them in the gospel industry with their album In This Place. After The True Believers, he started Castro Coleman and Highly Favored which again proved successful in the gospel industry, with television appearances on Bobby Jones Gospel. Their album Time Out gained national attention.

In 2012, Coleman decided that he wanted to venture over into the blues genre. He competed in the regional competition in the fall of 2012 and won. He then went to compete in Memphis in January 2013 where he made it to the finals. He went back and won the regional competition in the fall of 2013. Won again and was back in Memphis in 2014 to triumph at the International Blues Challenge.

He was the Blues Music Award 'Best New Artist Debut' winner in 2016 and The Spirit of Little Walter Award winner the same year. The same year, Castro was the first blues artist to have his handprint inducted into the Wall of Fame in Fredrikshavn, Denmark. For the 25th Annual Living Blues Awards, he won the Best Blues Album of 2017 New Recordings award (Contemporary Blues) with "Knock a Hole In It," and in 2018 he won the National Blues Artist of The Year award at 44th Annual Jackson Music Awards. At the 2025 ceremony of the Blues Music Awards, Coleman was named as the 'B. B. King Entertainer of the Year'.

On February 1, 2019, Castro and his group, The True Believers released a new album and DVD, Back To The Roots.

== Awards and endorsements ==
Coleman has won numerous awards, including:

- Bobby Rush 2014 Entertainer of the Year Award by the Jus' Blues Foundation
- 2015 International Male Blues Artist, 41st Annual Jackson Music Awards
- 2015 Blues Artist of the Year, 41st Annual Jackson Music Awards
- 2015 Entertainer of the Year, 41st Annual Jackson Music Awards
- Best Blues Album of 2017 New Recordings (Contemporary Blues) (for "Knock a Hole In It" Malaco Records), 25th Annual Living Blues Awards
- 2018 Gospel Group of the Year (with The True Believers), Mississippi Gospel Music Award
- 2018 National Blues Artist of The Year, 44th Annual Jackson Music Awards
- 2020 Award for Mississippi Legend at the Underground Southern Soul Awards
- 2025 'B. B. King Entertainer of the Year' category winner at the Blues Music Awards

Coleman has over 125 credits listed on AllMusic.

Coleman has given workshops for Epiphone He is endorsed by Ernie Ball, Nord, and Humes and Berg.

== Other projects ==
He is on the roster of the Mississippi Arts Commission. He conducts programs in the area schools teaching the young and old about the blues. His latest album The Mississippi Blues Child on the Malaco Records Label debuted at No. 6 on the Living Blues Chart and made the Top 50 for the 2015 year.

He was cast in Get on Up as the first guitar player for James Brown, playing the role of Les Buie. In 2016, he was cast as the young B.B. King on three episodes of the CMT series Sun Records and, in 2021, he was cast as a blues singer and musician in the movie Texas Red, performing one of his original songs from his new album Sippnotized with special arrangements for the movie.

In 2018, Coleman opened his own blues club known as Sipp's Place in Magnolia, Mississippi, although he had to close it in November 2019.

In 2019, among his blues tours and blues club in Magnolia, Castro Coleman came back to gospel with The True Believers. After a few years, Castro Coleman and The True Believers released Back to the Roots, recorded live in April 2018 at Prince Of Peace Church, Blytheville, Arkansas. It was released on February 1, 2019.

== Discography ==
=== Castro Coleman (Mr. Sipp) - The Mississippi Blues Child ===
- 2013: It's My Guitar
- 2015: The Mississippi Blues Child
- 2017: Knock A Hole In It
- 2020: Played Yourself (First Soul Single)
- 2021: Sippnotized
- 2023: The Soul Side Of Sipp

=== The True Believers ===
- 2018: Back to the Roots (CD)
- 2019: Back to the Roots (DVD)
