= 662 (album) =

Studio album by Christone "Kingfish" Ingram
- Released: July 23, 2021
- Studio: Ocean Way, Nashville
- Genre: Rock; blues; funk
- Label: Alligator
- Producer: Tom Hambridge

Christone "Kingfish" Ingram chronology
| Kingfish (2019) | 662 (2021) | Live in London (2023) |

662 is an album by blues guitarist and singer Christone "Kingfish" Ingram. His second album, it was released in CD, LP, and digital formats on July 23, 2021.

At the 2022 Grammys, 662 won the Grammy Award for Best Contemporary Blues Album.

== Critical reception ==
On AllMusic, Stephen Thomas Erlewine said, "662 is a quintessential second album from a hot young gun: it's a record that consolidates the personality Christone "Kingfish" Ingram unveiled on his debut while also expanding his musical and lyrical reach.... Ingram's muscular guitar and vocals are known quantities and it's good to hear him add some funk and rock to his blues..."

On The Arts Fuse, Scott McLennan wrote, "On 662, 22-year-old Christone "Kingfish" Ingram's scintillating vision of the blues comes into its own, his already highly developed guitar skills matched by a maturing singing voice that commands the listener's attention.... 662 will appeal to hard-core blues fans along with those who want more of a hyphenated blues sound, be it blues-rock, blues-funk or blues-pop."

On Rock and Blues Muse, Mike O'Cull said, "22-year-old blues phenomenon Christone "Kingfish" Ingram blows past all expectations on his brand new Alligator Records release 662.... Christone "Kingfish" Ingram is, by all indications, a bottomless well of music and 662 is required listening for every blues lover out there. Spin it once and you’ll understand."

== Track listing ==
All tracks written by Christone "Kingfish" Ingram and Tom Hambridge, except where indicated.

| No. | Title | Writer(s) | Length |
|---|---|---|---|
| 1. | "662" | | 3:18 |
| 2. | "She Calls Me Kingfish" | | 3:13 |
| 3. | "Long Distance Woman" | | 3:29 |
| 4. | "Another Life Goes By" | | 4:21 |
| 5. | "Not Gonna Lie" | Kingfish; Hambridge; Richard Fleming | 3:02 |
| 6. | "Too Young To Remember" | | 3:52 |
| 7. | "You're Already Gone" | | 3:27 |
| 8. | "My Bad" | Kingfish; Fleming; Hambridge | 3:37 |
| 9. | "That's All It Takes" | | 4:46 |
| 10. | "I Got To See You" | Kingfish; Fleming; Hambridge | 3:39 |
| 11. | "Your Time Is Gonna Come" | | 5:13 |
| 12. | "That's What You Do" | | 3:24 |
| 13. | "Something In The Dirt" | Kingfish; Fleming; Hambridge | 3:34 |
| 14. | "Rock & Roll" | Ashely Ray; Kingfish; Sean McConell | 4:40 |

== Personnel ==
Musicians

- Christone "Kingfish" Ingram – guitar, vocals
- Tom Hambridge – drums, background vocals, chimes
- Kenny Greenberg – guitar
- Bob Britt – guitar
- Glenn Worf – bass
- Tommy MacDonald – bass
- Marty Sammon – piano, Hammond B3 organ, Wurlitzer piano
- Max Abrams – saxophone
- Julio Diaz – trumpet

Production

- Produced by Tom Hambridge
- Executive producer: Ric Whitney
- Engineer: Zach Allen
- Assistant engineer: Ryan Yount
- Mixing, mastering: Tom Hambridge, Michael Saint-Leon
- Additional recording: Michael Saint-Leon
- Photos: Justin Hardiman
- Design: Kevin Niemiec
