= Live in London (Christone Ingram album) =

Blues album by Christone "Kingfish" Ingram

- CD cover

Live album by Christone "Kingfish" Ingram
- Released: September 15, 2023
- Recorded: June 6, 2023
- Venue: The Garage
- Genre: Blues
- Length: 107:12
- Label: Alligator
- Producer: Zach Allen

Christone "Kingfish" Ingram chronology
662 (2021)	Live in London (2023)	Hard Road (2025)

Live in London is an album by blues guitarist and singer Christone "Kingfish" Ingram. It documents a concert performed at the Garage in London on June 6, 2023. At this show Ingram was accompanied by Deshawn Alexander on keyboards, Paul Rogers on bass, and Christopher Black on drums. Ingram's first live album, and third album overall, it was released by Alligator Records for streaming and as a digital download on September 15, 2023, as a two-disc CD on October 13, 2023, and as a two-disc LP on November 10, 2023.

Live in London was nominated for a Grammy award for Best Contemporary Blues Album.

== Critical reception ==
On AllMusic, Thom Jurek said, "It's a beautifully recorded, incendiary gig captured in the moment.... Live in London provides more evidence that Ingram is a force to be reckoned with: Not only can he play like the legends, but he's an original vocalist, a solid songwriter, and a disciplined bandleader."

In Guitar World, David Mead wrote, "That magic has now been captured live – and it's a joy to hear.... For sure, there are plenty of great blues-orientated artists around, but Christone – with his Chicago blues meets '70s funk meets gospel leanings – demonstrates he's got the goods to be a modern-day legend."

In Blues Blast Magazine, Steve Jones said, "[Ingram] is touted as one of the saviors of the blues and, given his prowess on guitar, singing and songwriting, the description is well deserved.... Alexander does some standout work, using two hands to supply piano and organ and flesh out a huge sound that supplements the guitar and vocals of this young phenomenon."

Blues Rock Review wrote, "Throughout the concert, Kingfish's command over his instrument is awe-inspiring. He remains in the moment, at times raining down incendiary solos, other times picking poignant, blues-drenched licks, but always playing deeply from his heart."

Rock & Blues Muse said, "From start to finish, Live in London takes fans on a thrilling journey. Christone Kingfish Ingram has full control of his guitar and voice, and has mastered both in a way that puts him in a new category altogether. He's become next level and has now outclassed many of the current blues and rock artists performing today."

== Track listing ==
Disc 1

1. "She Calls Me Kingfish" (Richard Fleming, Tom Hambridge) – 7:08
2. "Fresh Out" (Fleming, Hambridge) – 8:48
3. "Another Life Goes By" (Christone Ingram, Hambridge) – 6:04
4. "Empty Promises" (Michael Burks) – 8:54
5. "Hard Times" (Fleming, Hambridge) – 6:35
6. "Mississippi Night" (Ingram) – 10:02
7. "Been Here Before" (Ingram, Hambridge) – 3:16
8. "Something in the Dirt" (Ingram, Fleming, Hambridge) – 2:49

Disc 2

1. "You're Already Gone" (Ingram, Hambridge) – 3:57
2. "Listen" (Ingram, Hambridge) – 6:04
3. "Rock & Roll" (Ashley Ray, Ingram, Sean McConnell) – 6:25
4. "Not Gonna Lie" (Ingram, Fleming, Hambridge) – 4:03
5. "Midnight Heat" (Fleming, Hambridge) – 5:24
6. "Outside of This Town" (Ingram, Hambridge) – 8:56
7. "662" (Ingram, Hambridge) – 6:03
8. "Encore Intro" (Christiopher Black, Ingram, DeShawn Alexander, Paul Rogers) – 4:52
9. "Long Distance Woman" (Ingram, Hambridge) – 6:56

== Personnel ==
Musicians

- Christone "Kingfish" Ingram – guitar, vocals
- Christopher Black – drums
- Paul Rogers – bass
- Deshawn "D-Vibes" Alexander – piano, Hammond B-3 organ, clavinet

Production

- Produced, recorded, and mixed by Zach Allen
- Executive producers: Christone Ingram, Ric Whitney
- Engineering: Landon Stanley, Joe Trentacosti, Richard Geduld, James Simpson
- Mastering: Alex McCollough
- Photos: Colin Hart
- Design: Kevin Niewiec
