= Doug MacLeod (musician) =

American storytelling blues musician (born 1946)

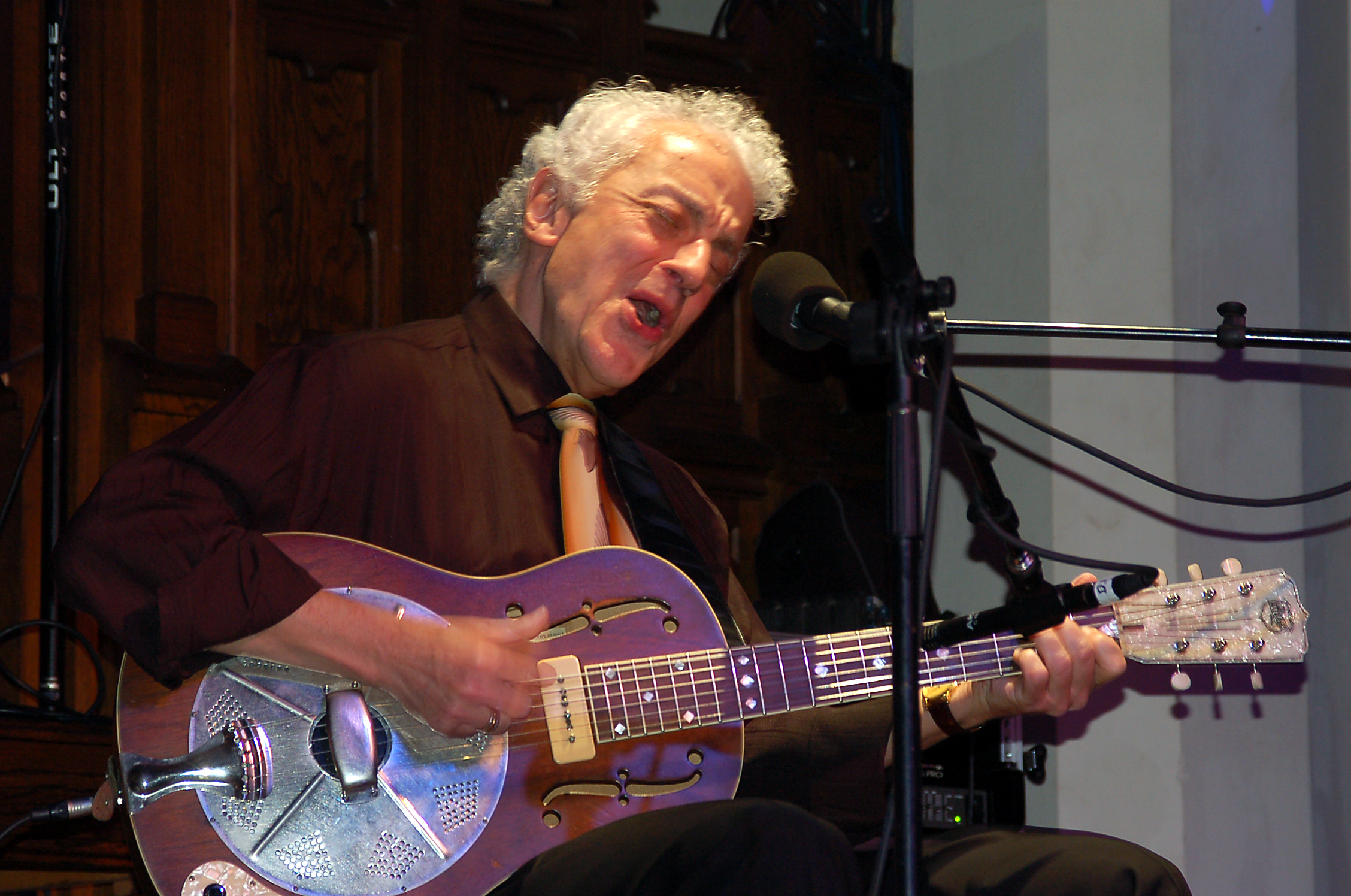
- Doug MacLeod

Background information
- Born: April 21, 1946 (age 80); New York, United States
- Genre: Blues
- Label: Reference Recordings
- Partner: Patti Joy
- Website: http://www.doug-macleod.com

Doug MacLeod (born April 21, 1946) is an American acoustic blues storyteller, songwriter, and guitarist. He previously served as the voice for the Blues Showcase of Continental Airlines. Over his career, MacLeod has won multiple Blues Music Awards, including Acoustic Artist of the Year in 2023. His albums A Soul To Claim and Raw Blues 1 received positive critical reception, with DownBeat awarding a 4-star review to A Soul To Claim, and Raw Blues 1 winning the 2024 Blues Music Award for Acoustic Album of the Year. His subsequent release, Between Somewhere and Goodbye, won the 2026 Blues Music Award for Acoustic Album of the Year.

MacLeod's musical style is influenced by early blues musicians. His work has received positive reviews from critics and peers. As Blues Music Magazine wrote, “Like all great blues men, MacLeod lives his music — the songs are one with his being.” Jorma Kaukonen called him “One of the great blues artists…period!”

MacLeod performs live concerts, hosts The Memphis Porch Sessions, and releases studio recordings.

== Early life ==
Doug MacLeod was born in New York City on April 21, 1946, and his family relocated to Raleigh, North Carolina shortly after his birth. MacLeod had a difficult childhood marked by abuse, and he had a severe stutter. As he struggled to overcome his speech impediment, he learned to play the guitar and started to sing, which helped him find his voice. The family moved back to New York before relocating to St. Louis when MacLeod was in his teens. He became a frequent visitor to St. Louis' blues clubs. As he honed his skills, he played around St. Louis in various bands as a bassist before enlisting in the Navy. While he was stationed in Northern Virginia, he spent time playing in the local scene and eventually became mentored by a musician named Ernest Banks, who told him "Never write or sing about what you don't know about." After he completed his time in the Navy, eventually settled in Los Angeles.

== Career ==
His entry into the L.A. blues scene saw him land sideman gigs with George "Harmonica" Smith, Big Joe Turner, Pee Wee Crayton, Eddie 'Cleanhead' Vinson, Lowell Fulson, and Big Mama Thornton. After a more than 40-year career, Doug MacLeod has recorded 29 studio albums, several live records, compilations, two blues guitar instructional DVDs, and a live performance DVD. Many artists have covered his songs including Albert King, Albert Collins, Joe Louis Walker and Eva Cassidy. MacLeod's songs have been featured in numerous made for TV movies and TV shows including R.J. Decker and In The Heat Of The Night.

From 1999 to 2004, MacLeod hosted "Nothin' But The Blues", a weekend blues radio show on Los Angeles' KLON/KKJZ. He has also been the voice for 'The Blues Showcase' on Continental Airlines. For ten years he penned "Doug's Back Porch," a regular feature column in Blues Revue Magazine. He is one of the four featured artists in the movie Resonate: A Guitar Story, the feature documentary on the making of National Guitars.

Doug MacLeod is a Reference Recordings artist and an active touring musician. During a feature interview for his sixth album, he credited Ernest Banks and George “Harmonica” Smith as his mentors.

== Awards ==
MacLeod has won nine Blues Music Awards, including:

- Acoustic Artist of the Year 2014, 2016, 2017, 2020, and 2023.
- Acoustic Album of the Year 2014, 2018, 2024, and 2026.

He has received multiple Blues Music Award nominations for:

- Best Song in 2006 ("Dubb's Talkin' Politician Blues"), in 2014 ("The Entitled Few") and in 2016 ("You Got It Good (and That Ain’t Bad)"),
- Acoustic Artist of the Year: 2008, 2009, 2010, 2011, 2012, 2013, 2014, 2015, 2016, 2017, 2018, 2020, 2021, 2022, 2023, 2024, 2025, and 2026
- Acoustic Album of the Year in 2012 (Brand New Eyes), 2014 (There's a Time), 2016 (Exactly Like This), 2018 (Break The Chain), 2024 (Raw Blues 1) and 2025 (Raw Blues 2), 2026 (Between Somewhere and Goodbye)
- Historical Album in 2017 (Live in Europe).

Doug MacLeod's Break the Chain release on Reference Recordings was nominated for three Blues Music Awards, the Independent Music Awards' Blues Album of the Year, and a Living Blues Top Album of 2017. The album was also a cover story feature for the January 2018 issue of Blues Music Magazine.

Doug MacLeod's 2022 release, A Soul To Claim on Reference Recordings was named a Downbeat Magazine Album of the Year.

Doug MacLeod's 2025 release, Between Somewhere and Goodbye on Reference Recordings was named a Downbeat Magazine Album of the Year.

Doug MacLeod has been nominated for Acoustic Guitarist Of The Year in 2024 and 2025 by Blues Blast Magazine. He received a Blues Blast Magazine nomination for Acoustic Blues Album Of The Year in 2024 for Raw Blues 2.

In 2026 Doug MacLeod was honored in his new home of Memphis. TN with the Prestigious 2026 Stone Award.

== Discography ==
- 'Go Tell It On The Mountain' (Holiday Single benefitting St. Jude Children's Research Hospital) (Bandcamp) 2026
- Between Somewhere and Goodbye (Reference Recordings 760) 2025
- Raw Blues 2 (EP) (Sledgehammer Blues/Valley Entertainment) 2024
- "Fine Lookin' Sugar" (Single) (Sledgehammer Blues) 2024
- Raw Blues 1 (EP) (Sledgehammer Blues 1065) 2023
- "I'm Gone" (Single) (Sledgehammer Blues) 2023
- "Plaquemine" (Single) (Sledgehammer Blues) 2023
- A Soul to Claim (Reference Recordings 746) 2022
- "Send the Soul on Home" (Single) (Under The Radar Music) 2019
- "Lobby Money" (Single) (Under The Radar Music) 2018
- Break the Chain (Reference Recordings 141) 2017
- Live in Europe (Under The Radar Music 40917) 2016
- "Plowin' Mule - Remix" (Single) (Black & Tan) 2016
- Doug MacLeod Remixed (EP) (Black & Tan) 2016
- Blues Masters, various artists (JVC/Master Music NT016) 2015
- Exactly Like This (Reference Recordings 135) 2015
- A Double Dose of Dubb (EP) (Black & Tan) 2015
- Acoustic Blues, Vol. 4: The Roots of It All (The Definitive Collection!), various artists (Bear Family Records) 2014
- There's a Time (Reference Recordings 130) 2013
- "Night Walking - Remix" (Single) (Black & Tan) 2013
- Come to Find (LP) (APO 1027) 2013 [reissue]
- Doug MacLeod: APO Direct-To-Disc (LP) (APO 022) 2012
- "The Devil is Beating His Wife - Remix" (Single) (Black & Tan) 2011
- Brand New Eyes (Fresh! From RR/Reference Recordings 703) 2011
- The Utrecht Sessions (Black & Tan 032) 2008
- Live at XM Radio, Vol. 2 (EP) (Black & Tan) 2007
- Live at XM Satellite (EP) (Black & Tan) 2007
- 101 Blues Guitar Essentials (instructional DVD) (Solid Air Records/Alfred Publishing) 2006
- Where I Been (Black & Tan 026) 2006
- Dubb (Black & Tan 022) 2004
- A Little Sin (Black & Tan 013) 2002
- Whose Truth, Whose Lies (Sledgehammer Blues (formerly AudioQuest Music 1054)) 2000
- BluesQuest, various artists (Sledgehammer Blues (formerly AudioQuest Music 1052)) 1999
- Live As It Gets (with John "Juke" Logan) (Mocombo Records 55003) 1999
- Unmarked Road (Sledgehammer Blues (formerly AudioQuest Music 1046)) 1997
- You Can't Take My Blues (Sledgehammer Blues (formerly AudioQuest Music 1041)) 1996
- Come to Find (Sledgehammer Blues (formerly AudioQuest Music 1027)) 1994
- Doug MacLeod Band: Live in 1991, Vol. 2 (Black & Tan) 2007
- Doug MacLeod Band: Live in 1991, Vol. 1 (Black & Tan) 2007
- Ain't the Blues Evil (Fantasy/Volt 3409) 1991
- Doug MacLeod Band: 54th and Vermont (Stomp 9.00817) 1989
- Doug MacLeod Band: Woman in the Street (Stomp 9.00444) 1987
- No Road Back Home (Hightone 8002) 1984

== Recordings as sideman ==
- Walking Shoes and Thinking Hat, Budda Power Blues (Bandcamp) 2024
- All Kinds Of Blues, Mick Kolassa (Endless Blues) 2024
- Back Home, Wendy and DB (Planet Wendy Publishing) 2024
- Wooden Music, Mick Kolassa (Endless Blues) 2023
- Rhythm Blues & Boogie, Dave Keyes (Blue Heart Records) 2022
- They Call Me Uncle Mick, Mick Kolassa (Endless Blues) 2022
- Two Sides, Kirsten Thien (Screen Door Records) 2020
- Pick Your Choice, George Harmonica Smith (Essential Media Group) 2014
- Get Your Nose Outta My Bizness!, Rich Del Grosso (Del Grosso Productions) 2005
- Slide guitar for August Wilson's play The Gem of the Ocean 2003
- Early Hours, Pee Wee Crayton (Blind Pig) 1999
- Now You Can Talk About Me, George Harmonica Smith (Blind Pig) 1998
- Dark Night, James Armstrong (Hightone) 1998
- Naked Heart, Susan J. Paul (Sugar Bone) 1997
- East Side Story, Kid Frost (Virgin) 1992
- The Ladies And The Babies, Frankie Lee (Hightone) 1984
- Make Room For Pee Wee, Pee Wee Crayton (Murray Bros.) 1983
- Boogie'n With George, George Harmonica Smith (Murray Bros.) 1982

== Books ==
- Who Is Blues Vol.1 - Doug MacLeod. 2018

== Film appearances ==
MacLeod appeared in Resonate: A Guitar Story along with Catfish Keith, Bob Brozman and Mike Dowling. Resonate is a story of contemporary players of National Reso-Phonic Guitars.

The Library of Congress recorded a video of MacLeod performing 'Catfish Blues' honoring David Honeyboy Edwards at the 2020 Folk Alliance in New Orleans LA.
