= International Blues Challenge =

Music competition

The International Blues Challenge (IBC) is a music competition run by the Blues Foundation.

Notable blues artists that have competed in the IBC over the years also includes Fiona Boyes, Eden Brent, Michael Burks, Tommy Castro, Sean Costello, Albert Cummings, Døvydas, Larry Garner, Zac Harmon, Homemade Jamz Blues Band, HowellDevine, Richard Johnston, Julian Fauth, Super Chikan, Susan Tedeschi, Southern Avenue, and Watermelon Slim.

The 1994 event in particular had much talent as Susan Tedeschi, Michael Burks (who won the Albert King Guitar Award) and a 16-year-old Sean Costello competed, although none of them were the eventual winner.

== History ==
The competition began in 1984, then named the Blues Amateur Talent Contest. The idea was to give amateur or up and coming musicians a chance to be discovered and get a foothold. In 1986, the event was renamed the National Amateur Talent Contest and 17 bands competed. Prior to 1993, the IBC had a rule that performers had to make less than 50% of their income from performing. This rule was dropped that year and the following year the word "Amateur" was dropped from the name of the event. In 1995, the event was renamed “The International Blues Talent Competition” to reflect the expanded demand and over 40 acts competed. No competition was held in 1999 as the timing of the event was changed from the fall during the King Biscuit Festival to the January/February time frame. In January 2000, the first International Blues Challenge was held with 50 bands competing. As the event has grown in size it was decided to split the acts into two categories, Band and Solo/Duo in 2002. Now each year more than 200 acts from around the world gather on Beale Street in Memphis, Tennessee, to compete for the International Blues Challenge.

Diunna Greenleaf and her backing band, Blue Mercy, won the competition in 2005. In 2006, the Joey Gilmore Band won the Best Band prize. The winners in 2008 were Trampled Under Foot. The 2010 winner of the top Solo/Duo prize was Matt Andersen. Grady Champion and his band won the Best Band title at the 26th International Blues Challenge in 2010, The 2011 winners of the Solo/Duo category were Georg Schroeter and Marc Breitfelder.

The band winner in 2014 was Mr. Sipp, with the solo winner being Tim Williams. In 2015, Eddie Cotton won the best band category, with Randy McQuay coming out on top in the solo/duo division.

== Band winners ==
Year	Band	Blues Society
1984	Reliance	A band from Memphis won the first Blues Amateur Talent Contest
1985	Reliance	Reliance repeated as winners
1986	Arletta Nightingale	Memphis, Tennessee
1987	N/K	(The Blues Foundation website does not list a winner)
1988	Larry Garner & the Boogaloo Blues Band	Baton Rouge, Louisiana
1989	John Weston	Lee County, Arkansas
1990	The Dynamics	Bloomington, Indiana
1991	The Roach Thompson Band	Miami, Florida
1992	Piano Bob & the Snowman (Robert Wilder & Ken Minahan)	Miami, Florida
1993	Evil Gal	Boston Blues Society
1994	The Hardway Connection	Washington, D.C.
1995	The Movers	Boston Blues Society
1996	Smilin Vic & the Soul Monkeys	Oklahoma Blues Society
1997	Chris Cameron	Fort Smith Blues Society
1998	Abe Reid	Piedmont Blues Preservation Society
1999	No challenge held	Moved date from King Biscuit Fest to January/February
2000	Dave Keyes Band	New York Blues Society
2001	Richard Johnston	Beale Street Blues Society
2002	Chef Chris & His Nairobi Trio	Canada South Blues Society
2003	Delta Moon	Charlotte Blues Society
2004	Zac Harmon & the Mid-South Revue	Southern California Blues Society
2005	Diunna Greenleaf and The Blue Mercy Band	The Blue Shoe Project
2006	Joey Gilmore	South Florida Blues Society
2007	Sean Carney Band	Columbus Blues Alliance
2008	Trampled Under Foot	Kansas City Blues Society
2009	J.P. Soars and the Red Hots	South Florida Blues Society
2010	Grady Champion	Mississippi Delta Blues Society of Indianola
2011	Lionel Young Band	Colorado Blues Society
2012	The WIRED Band!	Washington Blues Society
2013	Selwyn Birchwood	Suncoast Blues Society
2014	Mr. Sipp	Vicksburg Blues Society
2015	Eddie Cotton	Vicksburg Blues Society
2016	The Delgado Brothers	Ventura County Blues Society
2017	Dawn Tyler Watson	Montreal Blues Society
2018	Keeshae Pratt Band	Houston Blues Society
2019	Ms Hy-C and Fresh Start	St. Louis Blues Society
2020	HOROJO Trio	Ottawa Blues Society
2022	The Wacky Jugs	France Blues
2023	Mathias Lattin	Houston Blues Society
2024	Piper and the Hard Times	Nashville Blues and Roots Alliance
2026	Derrick Dove & The Peacekeepers	

== Solo/duo winners ==
In 2002, the Blues Foundation split the challenge into two categories and began awarding a winner in the Solo/Duo category.

Year	Band	Blues Society
2002	Little Toby Walker	Long Island Blues Society
2003	Fiona Boyes	Melbourne Blues Appreciation Society
2004	Lightnin' Lee & the Upright Rooster	Spa City Blues Society
2005	Jimi Hocking	Melbourne Blues Appreciation Society
2006	Eden Brent	Mississippi Delta Blues Society of Indianola
2007	Nathan James and Ben Hernandez	Blues Lovers United of San Diego
2008	Lionel Young	Colorado Blues Society
2009	Little Joe McLerran	Blues Society of Tulsa
2010	Matt Andersen	Harvest Jazz & Blues
2011	Georg Schroeter & Marc Breitfelder	Baltic Blues Society
2012	Ray Bonneville	Ozark Blues Society of Northwest Arkansas
2013	Little G Weevil	Atlanta Blues Society
2014	Tim Williams	Calgary Blues Music Association
2015	Randy McQuay	Cape Fear Blues Society
2016	Ben Hunter & Joe Seamons	Washington Blues Society
2017	Al Hill	Nashville Blues Society
2018	Kevin "B.F." Burt	Central Iowa Blues Society
2019	Jon Shain	Triangle Blues Society
2020	Héctor Anchondo	Blues Society of Omaha
2022	Eric Ramsey	Phoenix Blues Society
2023	Frank Sultana	Sydney Blues Society
2024	Joe Waters	Columbus Blues Alliance
2026	Weary Ramblers	

== Best Guitarist winners ==
1995	Geoff Achison	Melbourne Blues Appreciation Society
2008	Nick Schnebelen	Kansas City Blues Society
2016	Joey Delgado	Ventura County Blues Society
2017	Ben Racine	Montreal Blues Society
2018	Artur Menezes	
2019	Gabe Stillman	Billtown Blues Society
2020	JW-Jones	Ottawa Blues Society
2022	T.C. Carter	Piedmont Blues Preservation Society
2023	Mathias Lattin	Houston Blues Society
2024	Stephen Hull	Paramount Music Association
2026	Derrick Dove	

== Best self-produced CD award ==
Year	Band	Blues Society
2005	(TIE) Robin Rogers - Crazy, Cryin’ Blues	N/A
2005	(TIE) Collard Greens & Gravy - Silver Bird	Melbourne Blues Appreciation Society
2006	Roxy Perry - Back in Bluesville	N/A
2007	Mighty Lester Band - We are Mighty Lester	N/A
2008	Sue Palmer & Her Motel Swing Orchestra - Sophisticated Ladies	N/A
2009	Nathan James & Ben Hernandez - Hollerin’	N/A
2010	(TIE) The Informants - Crime Scene Queen	Colorado Blues Society
2010	(TIE) Laurie Morvan - Fire It Up!	N/A
2011	Joe McMurrian - Get Inside This House	Cascade Blues Association
2012	Dave Keller - Where I'm Coming From	Rhode Island Rhythm & Blues Preservation Society
2013	Steve Hill - Solo Recordings	Montreal Blues Society
2014	Hank Mowery - Account To Me	West Michigan Blues Society
2015	Altered Five Blues Band - Cryin' Mercy	Grafton Blues Association
2016	Rob Lumbard - Blues in a Bottle	Central Iowa Blues Society
2017	JW-Jones - High Temperature	Ottawa Blues Society
2018	Jontavious Willis - Blue Metamorphosis	Atlanta Blues Society
2019	Little Red Rooster Blues Band - Lock Up the Liquor	Central Delaware Blues Society
2020	Moonshine Society - Sweet Thing	River City Blues Society (VA)
2022	Memphis Lightning - Borrowed Time	Suncoast Blues Society
2023	Josh Hoyer & Soul Colossal - Green Light	Blues Society of Omaha
2024	Sister Lucille - Tell the World	
