= Anthony Geraci =

American musician

- Born: Anthony R. Geraci; 1954 (age 71–72); New Haven, Connecticut, United States
- Genres: Blues, jazz
- Occupations: Pianist, organist, singer, composer
- Instruments: Piano, organ
- Years active: 1970s–present
- Label: Various
- Website: Official website

Anthony R. Geraci (born 1954) is an American blues and jazz pianist, organist, singer and composer. A keyboard player with a professional career in excess of 40 years, Geraci has played on stage with Muddy Waters, B.B. King, Otis Rush, Chuck Berry, Big Mama Thornton, Big Joe Turner, and Jimmy Rogers, and has recorded work with Big Walter Horton, Ronnie Earl, Big Jack Johnson, Zora Young, Sugaray Rayford, Debbie Davies, and Kenny Neal among others. Geraci's work has been nominated for a Grammy Award and he has had numerous Blues Music Award nominations. In addition to his work with others, Geraci has released eight albums in his own name.

He is an original member of both Sugar Ray & the Bluetones and Ronnie Earl & the Broadcasters.

== Life and career ==
Anthony Geraci was born in New Haven, Connecticut, United States. He was raised in a home without any musical connection, but decided at the age of four that he wanted a piano. This unusual request was rewarded with the acquisition of an old upright piano costing $25.00, and Geraci started taking piano lessons. A few years later, a Kimball baby grand piano was purchased by his mother, as Geraci's playing proficiency grew. He had lessons at the Neighborhood School of Music, where at the age of 16, Geraci and a schoolfriend heard Jimmy Rogers recording of "Chicago Bound" (1954) which shaped his destiny. Geraci went on to graduate from the Berklee College of Music with a Bachelor of Arts degree, and then from Skidmore College with a Master of Arts degree in jazz studies. In the early 1970s, Gerachi relocated to Boston, Massachusetts and began immersing himself in the local blues and jazz scenes. Around 1974, Geraci was the opening act for a week of performances by Muddy Waters. He commenced playing with Jerry Portnoy and Bob Margolin when they were not touring with Muddy Waters. Through that connection he was approached by Michael "Mudcat" Ward and Ronnie Earl, and they jointly undertook gigs in both Boston and Providence, Rhode Island. Their drummer, Neil Gouvin, then brought Sugar Ray Norcia to attend one of those performances, and the original line-up of Sugar Ray & the Bluetones was formed. In the early days of the group, they backed several touring Chicago blues musicians such as Big Walter Horton, J. B. Hutto, and Hubert Sumlin; plus had a gig backing Junior Wells in Westerly, Rhode Island. In the late 1970s, the group also recorded a four track single for Baron Records, with "Oh Baby" as the lead track. Otis Rush was a fan of the recording. Over this period, the Bluetones also backed Memphis Slim for a few concerts in the Boston area.

In 1984, Ronnie Earl and the Broadcasters was formed, with Geraci a founding member. Geraci continued to work in both the Broadcasters and the Bluetones, then in 1992, he was also an original member of the Blue Monday All-Star Band at the first House of Blues in Cambridge, Massachusetts. In 1994, the album Take It from Me, billed as by Little Anthony & Sugar Ray Garcia, was issued by Tone-Cool Records. Superharps was an album issued in October 1999 that featured four harmonica players; James Cotton, Charlie Musselwhite, Billy Branch, and Sugar Ray Norcia, with piano accompaniment by Geraci. It garnered a nomination in the Best Traditional Blues Album category in 2001 for a Grammy Award.

In 2005, Geraci recorded and released, The Gift on Sunset Jazz Records, which was followed by Wake Up (2008). The jazz-tinged collection, Serendipity, was the next, issued in 2011. In addition to recording, Geraci maintained an educational schedule and taught for over 12 years at Johnson State College in Johnson, Vermont. He has taught at the South Shore Conservatory in Massachusetts since 2012. His 2015 album, Fifty Shades of Blue, was released by Delta Groove Productions. It earned Geraci multiple Blues Music Award nominations for 'Best Song', 'Best Album', and 'Best Traditional Blues Album', with Geraci getting an individual nomination for the 'Pinetop Perkins Piano Player'. The album's title of Fifty Shades of Blue, reflected the differing blues elements in the recording. Traditional Chicago blues was reflected in the ballad sung by Norcia, plus another sung by Michelle "Evil Gal" Willson. Other vocalists included Darrell Nulisch with a slow blues track, whereas an uptempo blues was sung by Toni Lynn Washington. The instrumentals sent a nod to Freddie King on "In The Quicksand, Again," plus a tribute to the recently departed Boston blues pianist, David Maxwell. Monster Mike Welch provided guitar work on several tracks. In addition to a slew of Blues Music Award nominations, Fifty Shades Of Blue was also nominated for Traditional Blues Album of the year by Blues Blast, got a four star review rating in DownBeat magazine. The album was credited to Anthony Geraci and the Boston Blues All-Stars.

For his next album, Why Did You Have to Go, Geraci penned "Baptized in the River Yazoo" and "Why Did You Have to Go" in Clarksdale, Mississippi. Geraci stated "there's something in the air down there." The album was recorded in two distinct locations, and incorporated many of the musicians that Geraci had worked with over the years. This included the original line-up of Sugar Ray and the Bluetones all performing on two tracks on the CD, "My Last Good-Bye" and "Times Running Out". It was the first time the combination had recorded together, since the four track single produced in the late 1970s. Again the recording attracted a slew of nominations for various Blues Music Awards with six in total, the most nominations for any artist in 2019. However, none of them won the title.

In July 2020, Daydreams in Blue, was released on Shining Stone Records. The album contained a dozen tracks. Ten were Geraci originals, augmented by a reworking of Earl Hines and Billy Eckstine's "Jelly, Jelly", plus one co-written by Brennan, Peter Wolf and Troy Gonyea, "Dead Man's Shoes". Personnel included Dennis Brennan (vocals and harmonica), Jeff Armstrong (drums), Michael "Mudcat" Ward (bass guitar), Troy Gonyea (rhythm guitar) who accompanied Geraci (piano), whilst guest musicians Walter Trout and Monster Mike Welch added lead guitar parts. Unusually Geraci himself handled the vocals on the track "Tutti Frutti Booty," the first time he had sung on any of his recordings. The poignant song, "Ode to Todd, Ella, and Mike Ledbetter", remembered friends and family. Daydreams in Blue peaked at number 4 on the Billboard Top Blues Albums Chart.

In 2022, Geraci signed with Blue Heart Records for release of Blues Called My Name.

Over the past decade he has fronted various performing groups. These include Anthony Geraci and the Boston Blues All-Stars; the Proven Ones that featured Kid Ramos, Willie J. Campbell, Jimi Bott and Brian Templeton; and Little Anthony & The Loco-Motives.

Geraci has performed at many festivals including the Montreux Jazz Festival (Switzerland), North Sea Jazz Festival (Netherlands), and Montreal International Jazz Festival (Canada).

Anthony Geraci and the Boston Blues All-Stars were a 2021 Blues Music Award nominee in the 'Band of the Year' category, whilst Geraci himself was nominated for the sixth consecutive time in the 'Instrumentalist Piano (Pinetop Perkins Piano Player Award)' category. The ceremony took place on June 6, 2021, and saw Geraci finally rewarded as that year's Pinetop Perkins Piano Player. Geraci won his second 'Pinetop Perkins Piano Player' citation at the 2023 Blues Music Awards.

== Discography ==
=== Albums ===
Year	Title	Record label	Credited to
1994	Take It from Me	Tone-Cool Records	Little Anthony & Sugar Ray Garcia
2005	The Gift	Sunset Jazz Records	Anthony Geraci
2008	Wake Up	Self-released	Anthony Geraci
2011	Serendipity	Hugadog Records	Anthony Geraci
2015	Fifty Shades of Blue	Delta Groove Productions	Anthony Geraci and the Boston Blues All-Stars
2018	Why Did You Have to Go	Shining Stone Records	Anthony Geraci
2020	Daydreams in Blue	Shining Stone Records	Anthony Geraci
2022	Blues Called My Name	Blue Heart Records	Anthony Geraci
