= Acquired Taste =

An acquired taste often refers to an appreciation for a food or beverage that is unlikely to be enjoyed by a person who has not had substantial exposure to it.

Acquired Taste may also refer to:

- An Acquired Taste, film by Ralph Arlyck
- Acquired Taste, album by Absynthe Minded, 2004
- Acquired Taste (Delbert McClinton album), 2009
- Acquired Taste, album by Junior Giscombe, 1985
