= Acquired Taste (Delbert McClinton album) =

Studio album by Delbert McClinton & Dick50
- Released: August 18, 2009
- Studio: East Iris (Nashville, TN); Henson (Los Angeles, CA); Fearless (Nashville, TN)
- Genre: Blues rock
- Length: 47:25
- Label: New West
- Producer: Delbert McClinton; Don Was; Gary Nicholson

Delbert McClinton chronology
Cost of Living (2005)	Acquired Taste (2009)	Blind, Crippled and Crazy (2013)

Professional ratings
Review scores
Source	Rating
AllMusic	3.5/5 stars
PopMatters	7/10

Acquired Taste is a studio album by American singer-songwriter Delbert McClinton in collaboration with musical quartet Dick50. It was released on August 18, 2009, via New West Records. The recording sessions took place at East Iris Studios in Nashville and in Henson Studios in Los Angeles with additional recording at Fearless Recording in Nashville. Produced by Don Was, Gary Nicholson and McClinton, it features contributions from Dennis Taylor, Julia Waters, Maxine Waters, Michito Sanchez, Rob McNelley, Stephen Bruton and Tom Hambridge.

In the United States, the album peaked at number 131 on the Billboard 200, number 23 on the Independent Albums and atop the Blues Albums charts.

== Track listing ==
No.	Title	Writer(s)	Producer(s)	Length
1.	"Mama's Little Baby"	Delbert McClinton; Gary Nicholson; Kevin McKendree	Don Was	3:08
2.	"Starting a Rumor"	McClinton; Nicholson; Guy Clark	Delbert McClinton; Gary Nicholson	3:40
3.	"Can't Nobody Say I Didn't Try"	McClinton	Don Was	3:13
4.	"Never Saw It Comin'"	McClinton; Nicholson; McKendree	Don Was	3:01
5.	"Do It"	McClinton	Don Was	2:48
6.	"I Need to Know"	McClinton; Nicholson; Anson Funderburgh; Renee Funderburgh	Don Was	3:06
7.	"People Just Love to Talk"	McClinton; McKendree; Rob McNelley	Don Was	3:16
8.	"Until Then"	McClinton; McKendree; Tom Hambridge	Don Was	4:58
9.	"Willie"	McClinton; Nicholson	Don Was	2:37
10.	"Wouldn't You Think (Should've Been Here by Now)"	McClinton; Nicholson; Benmont Tench	Don Was	4:32
11.	"She's Not There Anymore"	McClinton; McKendree; Hambridge	Don Was	3:03
12.	"When She Cries at Night"	McClinton; Al Anderson; Bob DiPiero	Don Was	3:08
13.	"Cherry Street"	McClinton; Nicholson; McKendree	Don Was	3:33
14.	"Out of My Mind"	McClinton; Nicholson; McKendree	Don Was	3:22
Total length:				47:25

== Personnel ==
- Delbert McClinton – vocals, harmonica, acoustic guitar, producer (track 2)
- Rob McNelley – background vocals (track 12), guitar
- Kevin McKendree – guitar (track 6), lead guitar (track 13), keyboards
- Steve Mackey – bass
- Lynn Williams – drums
- Julia Waters – background vocals (tracks: 1, 2)
- Maxine Waters – background vocals (tracks: 1, 2)
- Tom Hambridge – drums (tracks: 1, 11)
- Michito Sanchez – percussion (tracks: 1, 2, 5, 8)
- Stephen Bruton – background vocals & guitar (track 3)
- Dennis Taylor – saxophone (track 7)
- Donald "Don Was" Fagenson – producer (tracks: 1, 3–14)
- Gary Nicholson – producer (track 2)
- Krish Sharma – recording, mixing
- Jamie Sickora – additional engineering
- Heather Sturm – engineering assistant
- James Rudder – engineering assistant
- Paul Moore – art direction, design
- Heidi Ross – photography
- Kelle Musgrave – project coordinator
- Ragena Warden – additional project coordinator

== Charts ==
Chart (2009)	Peak position
US Billboard 200	131
US Independent Albums (Billboard)	23
US Top Blues Albums (Billboard)	1
