= Sugar Ray Norcia =

American songwriter

- Born: Raymond Alan Norcia; June 6, 1954 (age 72); Stonington, Connecticut, United States
- Origin: Rhode Island
- Genres: Electric blues, soul blues
- Occupations: Singer, harmonicist, songwriter
- Instruments: Vocals, harmonica
- Years active: Mid 1970s–present
- Label: Various
- Website: Sugar Ray & the Bluetones website

Sugar Ray Norcia (born Raymond Alan Norcia, June 6, 1954, Stonington, Connecticut, United States) is an American electric and soul blues singer and harmonica player. He is best known for his work with his backing band, The Bluetones, with whom he has released seven albums since 1980.

== Biography ==
Norcia started to play his harmonica based blues at high school. Once Norcia had relocated to Providence, Rhode Island, he formed 'The Bluetones' which secured a residence as the house band at a local nightclub. They backed touring acts, such as Big Walter Horton, Big Mama Thornton, Big Joe Turner and Roosevelt Sykes in nearby clubs. During the latter part of the 1970s, the band backed Ronnie Earl before he departed to join Roomful of Blues.

Norcia's solo recordings included the 7" EPs Sugar Ray and the Bluetones (1979) and Ronnie Earl and his Broadcasters featuring the Sensational Sugar Ray (1981), plus a couple of releases on Rounder Records, Knockout (1989) and Don't Stand In My Way (1991). Don't Stand In My Way was the first release by the Bullseye Blues label. The Bluetones also backed Miki Honeycutt on her initial album, Soul Deep.

In 1991, Norcia himself joined Roomful of Blues as their lead vocalist. They issued three albums with Norcia and undertook extensive touring duties. Norcia also undertook work away from the group. He appeared on a Bullseye Blues album from trombonist Porky Cohen, Rhythm and Bones, (1996) and on the album Little Anthony and Sugar Ray: Take It From Me, (1994). Also in 1994, Norcia appeared on Otis Grand's Nothing Else Matters album.

In 1998, Norcia exited from Roomful of Blues, and issued Sweet & Swingin', which featured songs written by Hank Williams, Arthur Alexander and Big Walter Horton; plus a guest appearance from The Jordanaires. In 1999, Norcia participated with James Cotton, Billy Branch and Charlie Musselwhite, on the Grammy Award nominated album, Superharps.

More recently, Norcia contributed his harmonica playing on records by Pinetop Perkins and Doug James, in addition to touring along with the 'Sugar Ray Norcia Big Band'.

In June 2007, Sugar Ray & the Bluetones released their seventh studio album, My Life, My Friends, My Music on Severn Records. Another Grammy nominated release followed in 2013 on Blind Pig Records', Remembering Little Walter, with Charlie Musselwhite, Billy Boy Arnold, Mark Hummel, James Harman, which garnered two Blues Music Awards that year.

in April 2016, Sugar Ray & the Bluetones were among the inductees who were brought into the Rhode Island Music Hall of Fame (RIMHOF). To date, Monster Mike Welch has played on five album releases by Sugar Ray & the Bluetones.

== Discography ==
- Knockout (Varrick/Rounder, 1989) with Kid Bangham
- Don't Stand In My Way (Bullseye Blues/Rounder, 1991) with Kid Bangham
- Take It From Me (Tone-Cool/Rounder, 1994) with Anthony Geraci
- Sweet & Swingin' (Bullseye Blues/Rounder, 1998) with Kid Bangham, Rob Nelson
- Superharps (with James Cotton, Billy Branch, and Charlie Musselwhite) (Telarc, 1999)
- Rockin’ Sugar Daddy (Severn, 2001) with Kid Bangham
- Sugar Ray & The Bluetones featuring Monster Mike Welch (Severn, 2003)
- Hands Across The Table (Severn, 2005) with Paul Size
- My Life, My Friends, My Music (Severn, 2007) with Duke Robillard, Monster Mike Welch
- Evening (Severn, 2011) with Monster Mike Welch
- Living Tear To Tear (Severn, (2014) with Monster Mike Welch
- Seeing Is Believing (Severn, 2016) with Monster Mike Welch
- Too Far From The Bar (Severn, 2020) with Little Charlie Baty, Duke Robillard
- Blues From Sibculo (Natural, 2025) with Rusty Zinn

== See also ==
- List of electric blues musicians
- List of soul-blues musicians
