= Breezy Rodio =

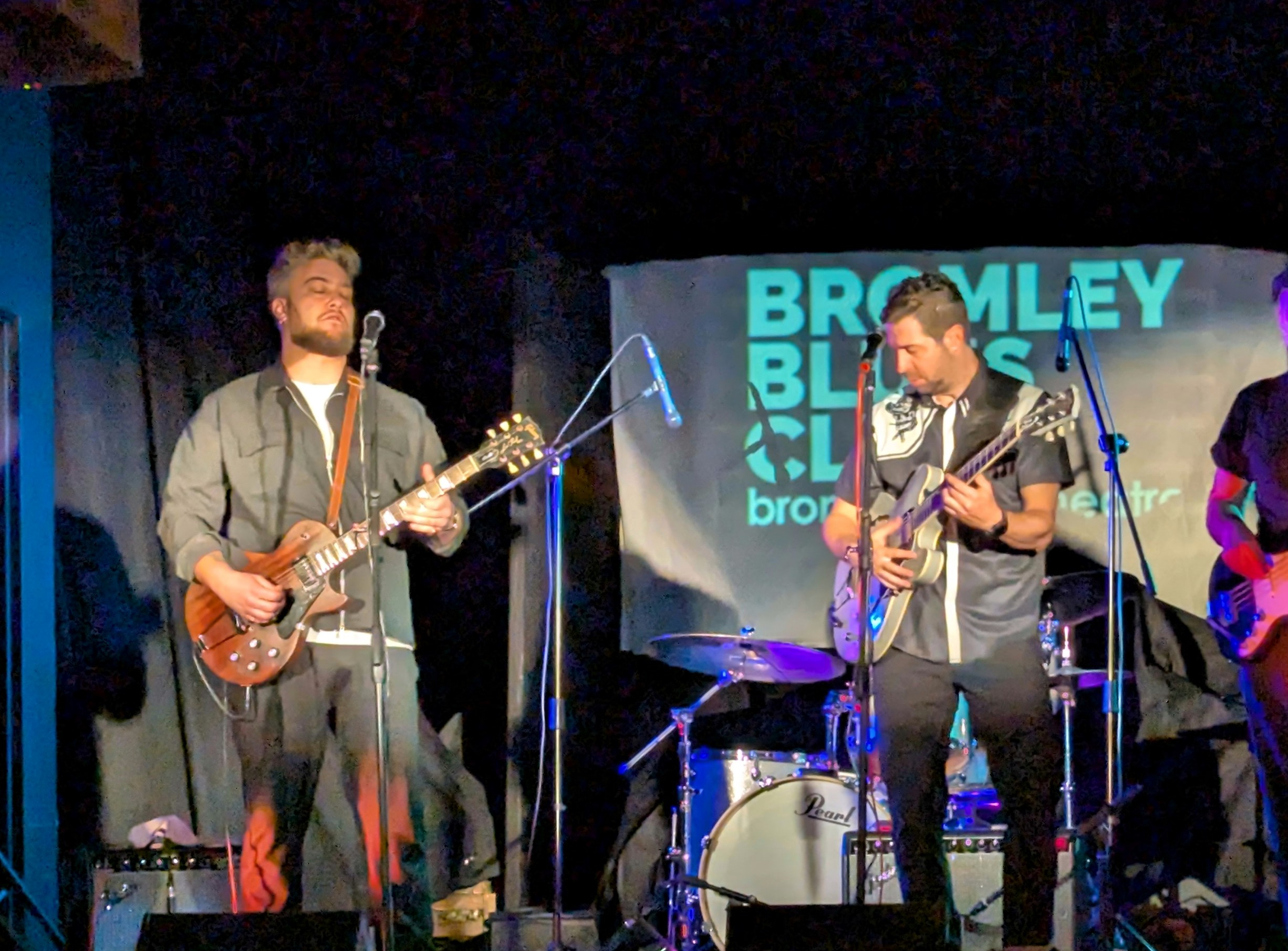
- Will Jacobs and Breezy Rodio (right) perform as the 'Electric Soul Company'

Background information
- Born: Fabrizio Rodio; Rome, Italy
- Genres: Chicago blues
- Occupations: Singer, guitarist, songwriter
- Instruments: Vocals, guitar
- Years active: 2000s–present
- Website: Official website

Fabrizio Rodio billed professionally as Breezy Rodio is an Italian born, American based Chicago blues singer, guitarist, and songwriter. He has been based in Chicago, Illinois, for over 20 years and has released six albums in his own name. His musical style was described by his record producer as "Chicago West Side Modern Blues".

== Life and career ==
Fabrizio Rodio was born in Rome, Italy. He relocated to Chicago, Illinois, United States in early 2000. In 2007, Rodio joined Linsey Alexander's band as lead guitarist and stayed in that expanding role for more than a decade. Rodio became a key band member and recorded four albums with Alexander, including If You Ain't Got It (2010), Been There Done That (2012) and Come Back Baby (2014). In 2011, Rodio recorded his own debut album, Playing My Game Too. He used several guest performers including Lurrie Bell, Rockin' Johnny, and Dave Herrero on guitar plus the bassist Bob Stroger, along with Guy King. Following another self-released record, Strange Situation, in 2014, Breezy issued So Close to It, which made number two in the Chicago Blues category on the Roots Music Report. So Close To It also featured guest spots from Billy Branch and Chris Foreman. He toured on the back of these releases which included Japan twice, South America three times, Europe twice, plus trips to Canada and Mexico.

In 2018, Rodio signed a recording contract with Delmark Records. His first release with them was Sometimes the Blues Got Me, which incorporated Rodio's versions of the songs "Wrapped Up in Love Again" (originally by Albert King) and "Blues Stay Away from Me" (originally by the Delmore Brothers). The same year, Rodio got a nomination in the Blues Blast Music Awards category, 'Rising Star of The Year'. In 2019, Rodio issued his second Delmark album, If It Ain't Broke Don't Fix It. The collection made it for selection to the Living Blues Top 50 Blues Albums of 2019. Guest musicians on the recording included the guitarists Christoffer Andersen and Monster Mike Welch. In 2021, Rodio backed Joe Barr on his album, Soul For The Heart, issued by Dixiefrog Records.

In February 2022, Rodio teamed up with the record producer and musician, Anson Funderburgh, to record Rodio's sixth album under his own name. Underground Blues was recorded in Austin, Texas. Having been previously aware of Rodio's style of music, Funderburgh described it as "Chicago West Side Modern Blues". The album was released by Windchill Records and had 14 tracks of original material penned by Rodio.

== Discography ==
=== Albums ===
Year	Title	Record label	Additional credits
2011	Playing My Game Too	Self-released	
2013	Strange Situation	Self-released	
2014	So Close to It	Windchill Records	
2018	Sometimes the Blues Got Me	Delmark Records	
2019	If It Ain't Broke Don't Fix It	Delmark Records	
2021	Soul For The Heart	Dixiefrog Records	Joe Barr with Breezy Rodio
2022	Underground Blues	Windchill Records	
