= Monster Mike Welch =

American blues guitarist and singer

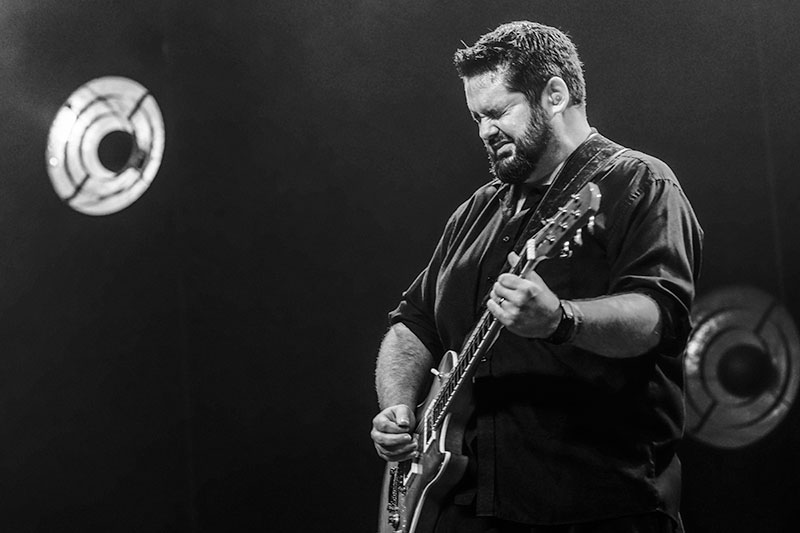
- Monster Mike Welch performing at Blues Heaven Festival, 2018

Background information
- Born: Mike Welch; June 11, 1979 (age 47); Boston, Massachusetts, United States
- Genres: Electric blues
- Occupations: Guitarist, singer, songwriter
- Instruments: Guitar, vocals
- Years active: 1992–present
- Labels: Tone-Cool Records, 95 North Records, BGB Records, Delta Groove Productions, Gulf Coast Records
- Website: monstermikewelch.com

Monster Mike Welch (born June 11, 1979) is an American electric blues guitarist, singer and songwriter. He was nominated for a Blues Music Award in 2017, 2018 and 2019.

Welch has released seven albums to date, and is a former member of Sugar Ray & the Bluetones.

Living Blues magazine cited "Welch is becoming an all-around guitar master." Welch has performed and recorded with Duke Robillard, Nick Moss, Johnny Winter, Darrell Nulisch and the Knickerbocker All-Stars, which featured among others, Jimmie Vaughan. Welch has also appeared on recordings by the Mannish Boys and contributed to Fifty Shades of Blue (2015), by Anthony Geraci and the Boston Blues All-Stars.

== Life and career ==
Welch was born in Boston, Massachusetts, United States. His musical education was helped by his access to his father's record collection, which included work by Magic Sam, Earl Hooker and B.B. King, and more rock oriented recordings by the Beatles and the Rolling Stones. It was the effect of Albert King's work that caused the youngster to gravitate toward the blues, and he learned to play the guitar at the age of eight.

Three years later his parents allowed him access to blues jams and clubs in the Boston area, and he learned further skills from musicians such as Ronnie Earl and Luther "Guitar Junior" Johnson. In 1992, Welch played at the opening of the first House of Blues club in Cambridge, Massachusetts. The club's co-owner, Dan Aykroyd, changed his nickname from "Little Mikey" to "Monster Mike." Within a short while the Monster Mike Welch Band was formed with George Lewis on guitar, Jon Ross on bass and Warren Grant on drums. They got named at the 1995 Boston Music Awards as the "Best Blues Act". With this line-up Welch released three albums on Rounder Records' Tone-Cool subsidiary. His early albums secured his place as an international touring act, and included These Blues Are Mine (1996), and Axe to Grind (1997). He was quoted in People magazine as "being an adolescent is more than enough blues for anyone to handle".

In 1997, Welch played at the Notodden Blues Festival. Catch Me followed in 1998, when Welch was still a teenager. Catch Me saw David Hull compose one track and play bass guitar on the album. The early attention came at a price. Welch later explained, "I struggled with that all the time... I think it's a large part of the reason why my early records are all original songs," he said. "It wasn't because I didn't want to record versions of some of my favorite (cover) songs, it was because I felt like I needed to give people something that wasn't as simple as guitar acrobatics from a novelty act.... I think some of my decisions (back then) were compensation for not wanting to be seen as immature or shallow."

In 2003, Welch contributed to the Severn Records release, Sugar Ray & The Bluetones Featuring Monster Mike Welch. It sparked the beginning of a long working relationship with that band.

Adding Insight to Injury was Welch's next solo release in 2004, which included a cover version of Bob Dylan's song "Masters of War". However the album was not a commercial success. By way of diversion, Welch moved briefly to France and backed the French harmonicist, Nico Toussaint, on a tour. Welch's next album release, Cryin' Hey! Monster Mike Welch Plays the Blues (2005), was issued solely in Europe on BGB Records. Around this time Welch took the opportunity to twice play alongside Johnny Copeland.

Welch went on to perform and record with Duke Robillard, Nick Moss, Johnny Winter, Darrell Nulisch and the Knickerbocker All-Stars, which featured Jimmie Vaughan. Welch has also appeared on recordings by the Mannish Boys and contributed to Fifty Shades of Blue (2015), by Anthony Geraci and the Boston Blues All Stars. He was also a guest performer on Billy Price's 2015 album, Strong. In addition, Welch continued to work with Sugar Ray Norcia, more recently issuing Seeing is Believing on Severn Records in October 2016. Earlier that year the act had played at the Hawaii Theatre in Honolulu.

In June 2016, Welch and singer Mike Ledbetter took part in a tribute to Otis Rush at the 33rd Chicago Blues Festival. Ledbetter had previously fronted the Nick Moss Band, and the Welch and Ledbetter live collaboration led to them recording an album together. Welch stated "... from the first time I heard Mike, I knew he was the kind of singer I’ve always been trying to play like." Ledbetter countered, "The way we played off each other was beautiful to me... Everything just fit perfectly." The album was titled Right Time Right Place and was released by Delta Groove Productions. Right Place Right Time's track listing included a number of original songs and several cover versions. These latterly comprise the album's opening track, a cover of Elmore James' "Cry for Me Baby"; the Willie Dixon penned "I Can't Stop Baby"; alongside a reworking of the Jerry Leiber and Artie Butler song "Down Home Girl"; plus "Cryin' Won't Help You", which was an old B.B. King song. Ledbetter died at his home in January 2019, aged 33, of complications from epilepsy.

Welch was nominated for a Blues Music Award in 2017, 2018, and 2019. He won the Award for 'Instrumentalist - Guitar' in 2019.

After a brief hiatus due to the COVID-19 pandemic, Welch announced in February 2023 that he had signed with Gulf Coast Records, with a new solo album, Nothing But Time, to be released on June 30 that year.

== Discography ==
Year	Title	Record label	Credited as
1996	These Blues Are Mine	Tone-Cool Records	Monster Mike Welch
1997	Axe to Grind	Tone-Cool Records	Monster Mike Welch
1998	Catch Me	Tone-Cool Records	Monster Mike Welch
2004	Adding Insight to Injury	95 North Records	Monster Mike Welch Band
2005	Cryin' Hey! Monster Mike Welch Plays the Blues	BGB Records	Monster Mike Welch
2007	Just Like It Is	BGB Records	Monster Mike Welch
2017	Right Place Right Time	Delta Groove Productions	Monster Mike Welch and Mike Ledbetter
2023	Nothing But Time	Gulf Coast Records	Monster Mike Welch
2025	Keep Living Til I Die	Monster Mike Records	Monster Mike Welch

== See also ==
- List of electric blues musicians
