= Billy Price (singer) =

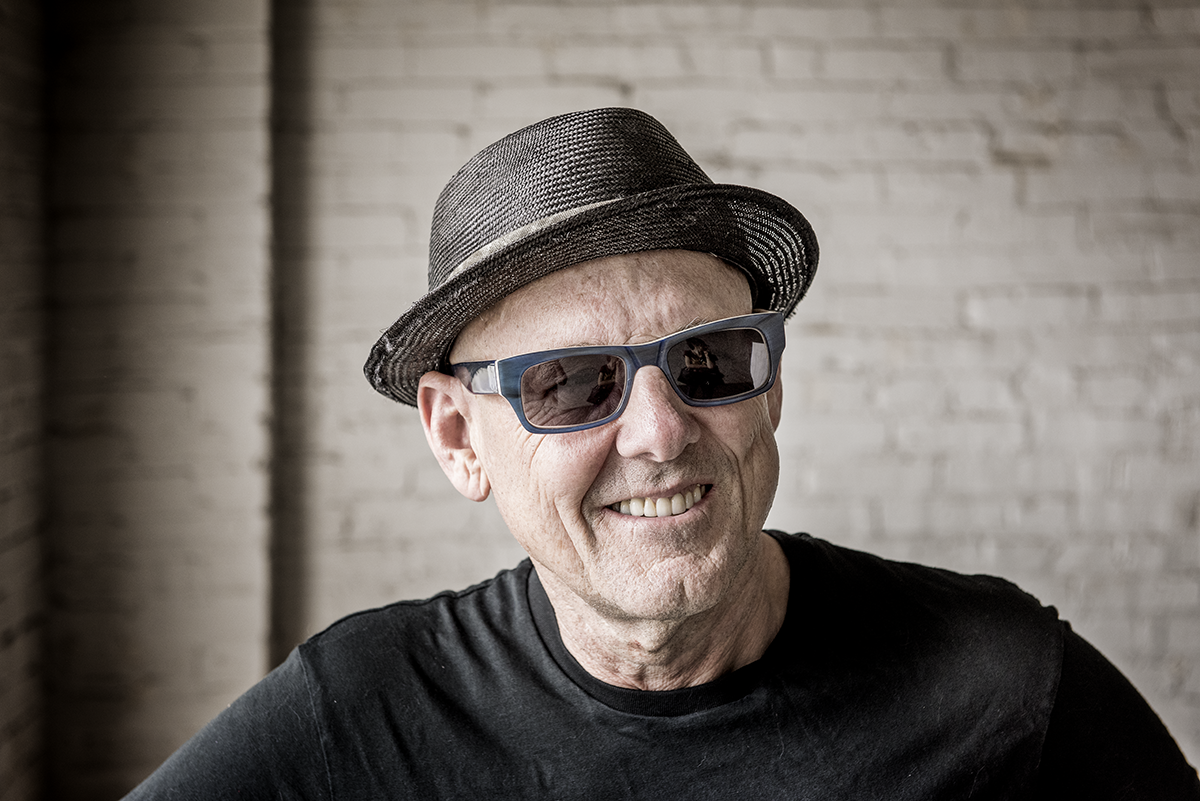
- Billy Price in Pittsburgh, Pennsylvania

Background information
- Born: William Pollak; November 10, 1949 (age 76); Fair Lawn, New Jersey, United States
- Genres: Soul
- Occupation: Singer
- Instrument: Vocals
- Years active: Mid-1970s–present
- Label: Various
- Website: https://www.billyprice.com/

William Pollak (born November 10, 1949, in Fair Lawn, New Jersey, United States) known by his stage name of Billy Price, is an American soul singer. He has lived in Pittsburgh, Pennsylvania, since the mid-1970s.

== Career ==
Price attracted national attention in the mid-1970s during his three-year collaboration with blues guitarist Roy Buchanan. The pair toured the US and Canada, playing Carnegie Hall in New York City, the Newport Jazz Festival, the Roxy and Troubadour in Los Angeles, and the Spectrum in Philadelphia. After leaving Buchanan, Price formed the Keystone Rhythm Band, which toured the Eastern US on a circuit that stretched from Boston to Atlanta with large followings in Boston, Philadelphia, Washington, D.C. and North Carolina. Sustaining several personnel changes, the band performed until 1990. He then formed The Billy Price Band, which currently consists of Lenny Smith (guitar), Tom Valentine (bass), Dave Dodd (drums), Jimmy Britton (keyboards), Eric Spaulding (tenor saxophone), and Joe Herndon (trumpet). The Billy Price Band won the Pittsburgh City Paper Reader's Poll award as Best Blues Band or Performer in 2021 and 2022.

In April, 2016, Price received a Legends of Pittsburgh Rock 'n Roll Award as a Modern Era Inductee. His 2015 recording with Otis Clay, This Time for Real, received a 2016 Blues Music Award (BMA) in the category of Soul Blues Album. His 2018 album Reckoning was nominated for a BMA in the category of Soul Blues Album. His album, Dog Eat Dog, was also nominated for a BMA in the category of Soul Blues Album in 2020. Price was also nominated as Soul Blues Male Artist in 2020, 2022, 2023, 2024, and 2025; and for Instrumentalist - Vocals in 2024 and 2025.

In 2022, Price released a 3-CD compilation of recordings from throughout his career titled 50+ Years of Soul on GetHip Recordings.

In 2024, Price released Person of Interest on the Little Village label. The recording was nominated for BMAs in the categories of Album of the Year and Soul Blues Album.

In 2024, Price received a Lifetime Career Award from Bluebird Reviews in the UK.

He worked for many years in corporate communications at the Software Engineering Institute at Carnegie Mellon University until August, 2023. He continues to perform regularly in Pittsburgh, the eastern United States, and in Europe.

== Discography ==
- 2024: Person of Interest, recorded at Ultratone Studios in Studio City, California; Little Village Foundation
- 2022: 50+ Years of Soul, 3-CD compilation; GetHip Recordings
- 2019: Dog Eat Dog, recorded at Greaseland Studios, San Jose, California; Gulf Coast Records
- 2018: Reckoning, recorded at Greaseland Studios, San Jose, California; Vizztone label group
- 2017: Alive and Strange, live recording of the Billy Price Band at Club Café, Pittsburgh, Pennsylvania, September 2016; Vizztone label group
- 2015: This Time For Real, with Otis Clay; Vizztone label group
- 2013: Strong, featuring the Billy Price Band and special guests Monster Mike Welch, Mark Wenner and Mark Stutso of The Nighthawks, and Fred Chapellier.
- 2010: Billy Price and Fred Chapellier Live on Stage, CD and DVD documenting the May 2009 Night Work tour, featuring French guitarist Fred Chapellier and his band and Billy Price Band keyboard player Jimmy Britton; recorded live at Espace Manureva, Charleville-Mézières, France.
- 2009: Night Work, DixieFrog Records (France), with French guitarist Fred Chapellier and special guests Otis Clay and Mark Wenner of The Nighthawks.
- 2006: East End Avenue, 14 songs (13 original), including six co-written with Jon Tiven.
- 2003: Funky, Funky Soul, DVD of performance at the Belgium Rhythm & Blues Festival.
- 2002: Sworn Testimony: The Billy Price Band Live, Double-CD of April 2002 performance at the Ram's Head Tavern in Annapolis, Maryland.
- 1999: Can I Change My Mind, Collection of songs written specifically for Price by Jerry "Swamp Dogg" Williams.
- 1997: The Soul Collection, CD containing 16 soul songs including a duet with Otis Clay, "That's How It Is".
- 1993: Danger Zone, Price's first album without the Keystone Rhythm Band.
- 1988: Free At Last, Album with the Keystone Rhythm Band featuring songs written by Price and other members of the band.
- 1984: Live, Recording of Billy Price and the Keystone Rhythm Band live at the Wax Museum in Washington, D.C.
- 1981, 1979: Is It Over?, They Found Me Guilty, CD of Price's first two albums with the Keystone Rhythm Band.
