= Johnny Castle =

Johnny Castle may refer to

- Johnny Castle, bass guitar in band, The Nighthawks
- Johnny Castle, lead character in film, Dirty Dancing
