= Lou Pride =

American singer (1944–2012)

- Born: George Louis Pride; May 24, 1944; Chicago, Illinois, U.S.
- Died: June 5, 2012 (aged 68) Chicago, Illinois, United States
- Genres: Blues, soul
- Occupations: Singer, songwriter
- Instrument: Vocals
- Years active: 1960s–2012
- Labels: Various including Ichiban, Curtom and Severn
- Website: www.loupride.com

Lou Pride (May 24, 1944 – June 5, 2012) was an American blues and soul singer and songwriter. Some sources state his year of birth was 1950. He is best known for his compositions "Long Arm of the Blues" and "Love From a Stone". Pride had a cult following among British Northern soul aficionados.

Before his death, Allmusic noted that Pride had a "smooth, uptown southern voice," and was "more known for performances in blues clubs and festivals than his artistry in the studio."

== Biography ==
He was born George Louis Pride, in Chicago, Illinois, United States. Pride grew up on Chicago's north side and attended the First Baptist Church, where the pastor was Nat King Cole's father.

After conscription in the United States Army, Pride met and married a female singer and they settled in El Paso, Texas. They performed as a singing duo before, after seeing B.B. King perform live, Pride concentrated his singing future around the blues and soul music genres. Pride recorded his first two singles in the early 1970s. These were "I'm Com'un Home In The Morn'un" (1972) and "Your Love Is Fading," both released by Suemi Records. After relocating to New Mexico, he recorded sporadically while constantly performing in blues clubs and at festivals on the Chitlin' Circuit. Other tracks of his that were released over this period included "Look Out on Love," "We're Only Fooling Ourselves," "You've Got to Work for Love," and "Been Such a Long Time."

Pride's debut album was entitled, Very Special (1979), which was released by Black Gold Entertainment. Several singles were issued before Gone Bad for a Very Special Reason (1988) was released, which had an almost an identical playlist to his debut effort.

After returning to Chicago, he became acquainted with Curtis Mayfield, which saw Gone Bad Again (1990) being issued. However, Pride's recordings remained second place to performing live. The WMB Records release, Love at Last (1995), contained re-recordings of several of Pride's earlier cuts. His 1997 Ichiban release was Twisting the Knife, followed by I Won't Give Up (2000). Pride signed a recording contract with Severn Records in 2002, which preceded his first release for them, Words of Caution. His early 1970s recordings were collected on the compilation album, The Memphis/El Paso Sessions 1970–1973, which Severn issued in June 2003. Allmusic noted that the collection "remains a treasure trove of previously obscure soul music that spotlights one of the many great singers almost lost to history."

In 2004, Pride undertook a brief tour in the UK. Alongside Darrell Nulisch, Pride was also the headline act at the Severn Records Soul and Blues Revue, in Chicago, in 2006. Snippets of his composition, "Bringin' Me Back Home," were used in the 2007 film, Feast of Love. Pride's appearance at the Severn Soul Review in 2010 was a significant comeback. He had been booked to appear in 2004, but he had had a heart attack before he could perform.

Following a period of ill health, Pride died in Chicago in June 2012 of natural causes. He was aged 68.

== Discography ==
=== Albums ===
| Year | Title | Label |
|---|---|---|
| 1979 | Very Special | Black Gold Entertainment |
| 1988 | Gone Bad for a Very Special Reason | Black Gold Entertainment |
| 1990 | Gone Bad Again | Curtom/Ichiban |
| 1995 | Love at Last | WMB Records |
| 1997 | Twisting the Knife | Ichiban |
| 2000 | I Won't Give Up | Icehouse Records |
| 2002 | Words of Caution | Severn |
| 2003 | The Memphis/El Paso Sessions 1970–1973 | Severn |
| 2005 | Keep on Believing | Severn |
| 2013 | Ain't No More Love In This House | Severn |

=== Selected singles ===
| Year | Title | Label |
|---|---|---|
| 1970 | "I'm Com'un Home In The Morn'un" | Suemi Records |
| 1970 | "It's A Man's World" | Suemi Records |
| 1970 | "Lonely Room" (with Bobby Gamble & Oliver Lacy) | Suemi Records |
| 1975 | "Phoney People" | Gemco Records |
| 1978 | "If Loving You Is Wrong I Don't Want To Be Right" | Black Gold Records |
| 1979 | "Very Special" | Black Gold |
| 1984 | "Been Such A Long Time" | Onyx Records |
| 1986 | "Gone Bad" | Black Gold |
| 1988 | "I Found A Love" | Black Gold |
| 1990 | "I Didn't Take Your Woman | Curtom Records |

== See also ==
- List of blues musicians
