= Steve Guyger =

American singer

- Born: September 12, 1952 (age 73); Philadelphia, Pennsylvania
- Genres: Chicago blues, electric blues, swamp blues
- Occupations: Harmonicist, singer, songwriter
- Instrument(s): Harmonica, vocals
- Years active: Late 1970s–present
- Labels: Various including Severn Records
- Website: www.steveguyger.com

Steve Guyger (born September 12, 1952) is an American Chicago blues harmonica player, singer, and songwriter. He has recorded five albums since 1997, having previously backed Jimmy Rogers for almost fifteen years.

Rick Estrin, from Rick Estrin & the Nightcats, referred to Guyger in the liner notes of one of the latter's albums as "a true master of the blues harmonica." Guyger has played with Rogers, Charlie Musselwhite, Little Sammy Davis and Mark Hummel, and is proficient in both diatonic and chromatic instruments.

== Biography ==
Guyger was born in Philadelphia, and initially studied guitar for five years before his future sister-in-law gave him a harmonica as a gift. Inspired by watching various blues musicians following trips to both New York City and Chicago, Guyger formed his own band in the late 1970s. Personnel came and went and he changed the name of the band to the Excellos in 1980, who steadily built up a growing reputation playing in both Philadelphia and New York. Guyger started backing Jimmy Rogers in 1980, and played with him until just before Rogers' death in 1997. That same year Guyger's debut album, Last Train to Dover, was released.

In 1999, Severn Records released Guyger's third album, Past Life Blues.

In 2008, Guyger performed at the Lucerne Blues Festival. His most recent album, Radio Blues was released in March the same year to critical acclaim. His guest musicians included Johnny Moeller. The following year his work saw Guyger nominated for a Blues Music Award.

In 2010, he issued an instructional DVD, entitled Blues Harmonica, published by the Hal Leonard Corporation. He currently endorses Hohner harmonicas.

== Discography ==
Year	Title	Record label
1997	Last Train to Dover	Blues Leaf Records
1998	Live at Dinosaur	Horseplay
1999	Past Life Blues	Severn Records
2006	Down Home Old School Country Blues (with Richard Ray Farrell)	Bluebeet
2008	Radio Blues	Severn Records

== See also ==
- List of electric blues musicians
- List of harmonica blues musicians
