= Big Joe Maher =

American drummer

- Also known as: Big Joe
- Born: Joseph W. Maher c. 1953 (age 72–73); Washington, D.C., United States
- Genres: Electric blues, rhythm and blues, jump blues
- Occupations: Drummer, singer, songwriter, record producer
- Instruments: Drums, vocals
- Years active: 1980s–present
- Website: bigjoem.com

Joseph W. Maher (born c. 1953), known as Big Joe Maher, is an American electric blues drummer, singer and songwriter. He is known for his jump blues group called Big Joe and the Dynaflows. He has worked with many blues musicians including Delbert McClinton, Anson Funderburgh, Kevin McKendree, Bob Margolin, Mark Wenner, Ann Rabson, Jimmy Witherspoon, Bull Moose Jackson, Nappy Brown, Otis Rush, Earl King, Duke Robillard, and Tom Principato.

== Life and career ==
Joseph Maher was born and raised in Washington, D.C., and initially inspired by both his father's record collection and attending blues concerts in his hometown, Maher had learned to play the drums by his early teenage years. After graduation Maher assembled a three-piece blues/jazz ensemble, before touring as part of Tom Principato's backing band. He later put together a five-piece band known as Big Joe and the Dynaflows, who specialised in dance-oriented jump blues.

Big Joe and the Dynaflows' debut album, Good Rockin' Daddy, was released by Ichiban Records in 1990. Then followed a string of releases on various record labels up to All Night Long (2000). These included, Mojo, a stripped down affair which featured Jeff Sarli on bass guitar. In December 1994, The Washington Post noted that "listening to the opening (and title) track for a few seconds is all it takes to confirm that this session's atmosphere and pacing has more to do with Percy Mayfield's laconic balladry, than Big Joe Turner's barroom barking". His 1998 release, I'm Still Swingin', was given a Washington Area Music Award for Best Blues Recording. Maher has also performed with his own Big Three Trio and the Big Four Combo, which have included John Cocuzzi.

Maher later worked as the musical director at Mick Fleetwood's Alexandria, Virginia nightclub, Fleetwood's. Several occasions followed where Fleetwood booked Big Joe and the Dynaflows as his back-up band at the club. Maher has also worked extensively on other musicians' recordings, including Bob Margolin's The Old School, Tom Principato's In Orbit (1991), Mark Wenner's Nothin' But, plus Ann Rabson's Music Makin' Mama (1997).

In 2005 and 2009, Maher was awarded the title of Male Blues Vocalist of the Year at the Washington Area Music Awards.

In 2000, his band was involved in the recording of I Warned You Baby, a compilation made for use by the Carolina shag scene.

You Can't Keep a Big Man Down was released in 2011 on Severn Records. The title track related to the almost career-ending back injury which Maher suffered in late 2001, and explained his long absence from recording. The album included a guest appearance from Dennis Taylor on saxophone.

In mid 2012, Maher jointly toured with Anson Funderburgh.

Big Joe and the Dynaflows' most recent release, Rockhouse Party, was issued on February 15, 2019.

== Discography ==
=== Albums ===
Year	Title	Record label
1990	Good Rockin' Daddy	Ichiban
1993	Layin' in the Alley	Black Top
1994	Mojo	Wildchild!
1997	Cool Dynaflow	Tramp
1998	I'm Still Swingin'	Severn
2000	All Night Long	Severn
2000	I Warned You Baby	Gutter
2011	You Can't Keep a Big Man Down	Severn
2019	Rockhouse Party	Severn

== See also ==
- List of electric blues musicians
