= Clarence Spady =

American blues musician (born 1961)

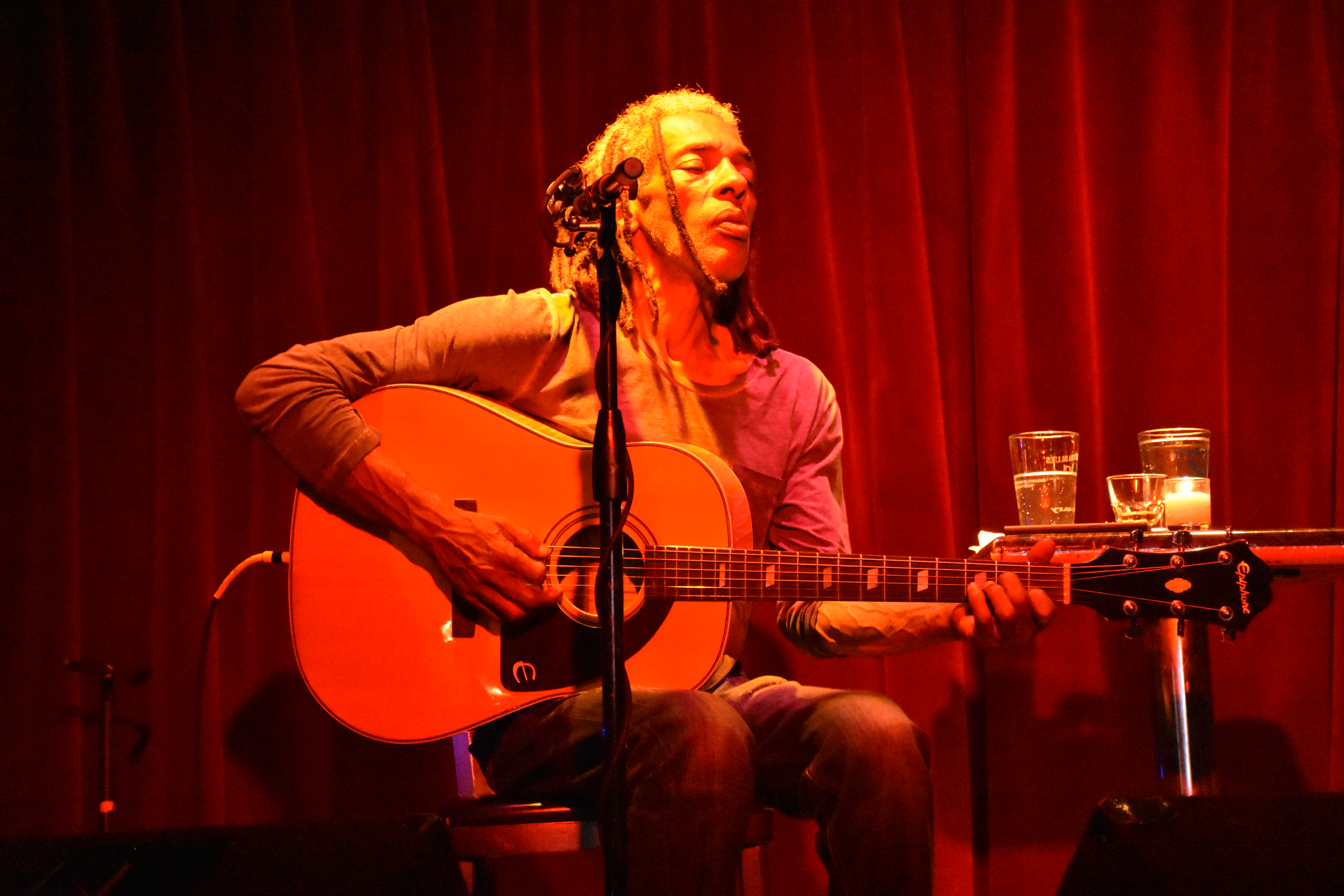
- Spady performing at Terra Blues in Greenwich Village, New York City

Background information
- Born: July 1, 1961 (age 65); Paterson, New Jersey, U.S.
- Genres: Blues * R&B * Jazz * Rock
- Labels: Evidence Music, Severn Records,

Clarence Spady (born July 1, 1961) is an American blues singer, songwriter and guitarist from Paterson, New Jersey. His unique musical style combines blues, jazz, funk, latin and rock. He has released three studio albums, Nature of the Beast (1996), Just Between Us (2008) and Surrender (2021).

== Early years ==
Spady was immersed in music from a young age; both his father (also Clarence) and his Uncle Fletchey were blues guitarists. Young Clarence took up the guitar aged five and later recalled how he “gravitated towards the blues” after learning how to play chords and solo. The family later moved to Scranton, Pennsylvania, where Spady was introduced to rock music. Throughout his teenage years he continued to experiment with guitar playing without receiving any formal training.

== Early career ==
On graduation, Spady worked with Greg Woods at his studio in Englewood, New Jersey. Although he was primarily tasked with odd jobs, he was eventually able to take part in recording sessions with artists such as the Johnson Family. In the early 1980s, Spady toured with Touch of Class for two years, before joining Pennsylvania based singer Greg Palmer's band for six years. In the early 1990s, Spady played in Michigan funk bands for two years before returning home to Scranton.

== Solo career ==
Spady found little opportunity to form an R&B band in his home town so returned to his blues roots and put together the West Third Street Blues Band. For 16 years he worked as a union operator during the day while playing music at night. The band soon started writing and recording their own songs which culminated with the 1996 release of Nature of the Beast for the Evidence Music label. Spady was at the time listed as one of the top 40 blues artists under 40 by Living Blues, and subsequently nominated as Best New Blues Artist for the 1997 W.C. Handy Awards (now Blues Music Award). In 2008, Spady released his second album, Just Between Us with Severn Records. Once again the album was well received and was nominated for a Blues Music Award in 2009.

== Surrender ==
In 2021, Spady released Surrender, a personal collection of songs reflecting on his life and career. Spady has made no secret of his battles with drugs and alcohol in the past, challenges which inspired the writing in this album. The album received favourable reviews from critics on its release, with Elmore Magazine's Jim Hynes commenting that "Spady has found his comfort zone at the intersection of Blues and Soul".

== Awards and accolades ==
- 1997 Blues Music Award - Nominee for Best New Blues Artist - Nature of the Beast
- 2009 Blues Music Award - Nominee for Soul Blues Album of the Year - Just Between Us
- 2020 International Songwriting Competition - Third place (Blues) - "Surrender" (single)
- 2021 Global Music Awards - Outstanding Achievement - "Surrender" (single)

== Discography ==
Album	Release date	Label
Nature of the Beast	1996	Evidence Music
Just Between Us	2008	Severn Records
Surrender	2021	Nola Blue
