= GHS (strings) =

American guitar string manufacturer

GHS strings
- Company type: Private
- Industry: Musical instruments
- Founded: August 1, 1964
- Headquarters: 2813 Wilbur Ave Battle Creek, Michigan, 49037
- Key people: Russell McFee (President)
- Products: Instrument strings; Acoustic guitar pickups; Musical instrument accessories
- Number of employees: 20 (est)
- Website: ghsstrings.com

GHS Strings is an American string manufacturer based in Battle Creek, Michigan, specializing in electric guitar, acoustic guitar, and bass guitar strings. The company was founded on August 1, 1964, and in 1975 was bought by Robert McFee, who is the chairman of the board with his son, Russell McFee, as president. The name GHS comes from the surnames of the company's founders — Gould, Holcomb and Solko.

In 2000, the GHS acquired guitar electronics company Rocktron, diversifying into new types of guitar equipment.

== Users ==
GHS strings are used by many musicians of varying styles, but several notable artists include:

- Jack White of The White Stripes
- Dusty Hill of ZZ Top
- Carlos Santana
- Tom Morello formerly of Audioslave and Rage Against the Machine
- Eddie Vedder of Pearl Jam
- Stevie Ray Vaughan
- David Gilmour of Pink Floyd
- Flea of Red Hot Chili Peppers
- Dan Donegan of Disturbed
- Quorthon of Bathory
- Willie Adler and Mark Morton of Lamb of God
- Stone Gossard of Pearl Jam
- Justin Hayward and John Lodge of The Moody Blues
- Tommy Shaw of Styx
- Neal Schon of Journey
- Mark Stoermer of The Killers
- Matchbox 20
- Ted Nugent
- Foo Fighters
- Lynyrd Skynyrd
- Def Leppard
- Steve Howe of Yes
- Hank Williams Jr.
- Evan Hirschelman
- Rusty Cooley of Outworld
- Martin Barre of Jethro Tull
- Stuart Hamm of Joe Satriani
- Goo Goo Dolls
- John Mellencamp
- Diamond Rio
- The Oak Ridge Boys
- Collin Raye
- Seventh Day Slumber
- Steven Springer
- Third Eye Blind
- Travis Tritt
- Pam Tillis
- No Doubt
- Gary Hoey
- Rancid
- Gene Simmons of Kiss
- James Mercer of The Shins
- Skillet
- Ola Englund of Feared and The Haunted
- Randy Rhoads of Ozzy Osbourne and Quiet Riot
- Damon Fowler
- Dany Franchi
- Michael Wilton of Queensrÿche
- Chris DeGarmo (formerly of Queensrÿche)
- Chuck Schuldiner
