= Linsey Alexander =

American blues songwriter, vocalist and guitarist (1942–2025)

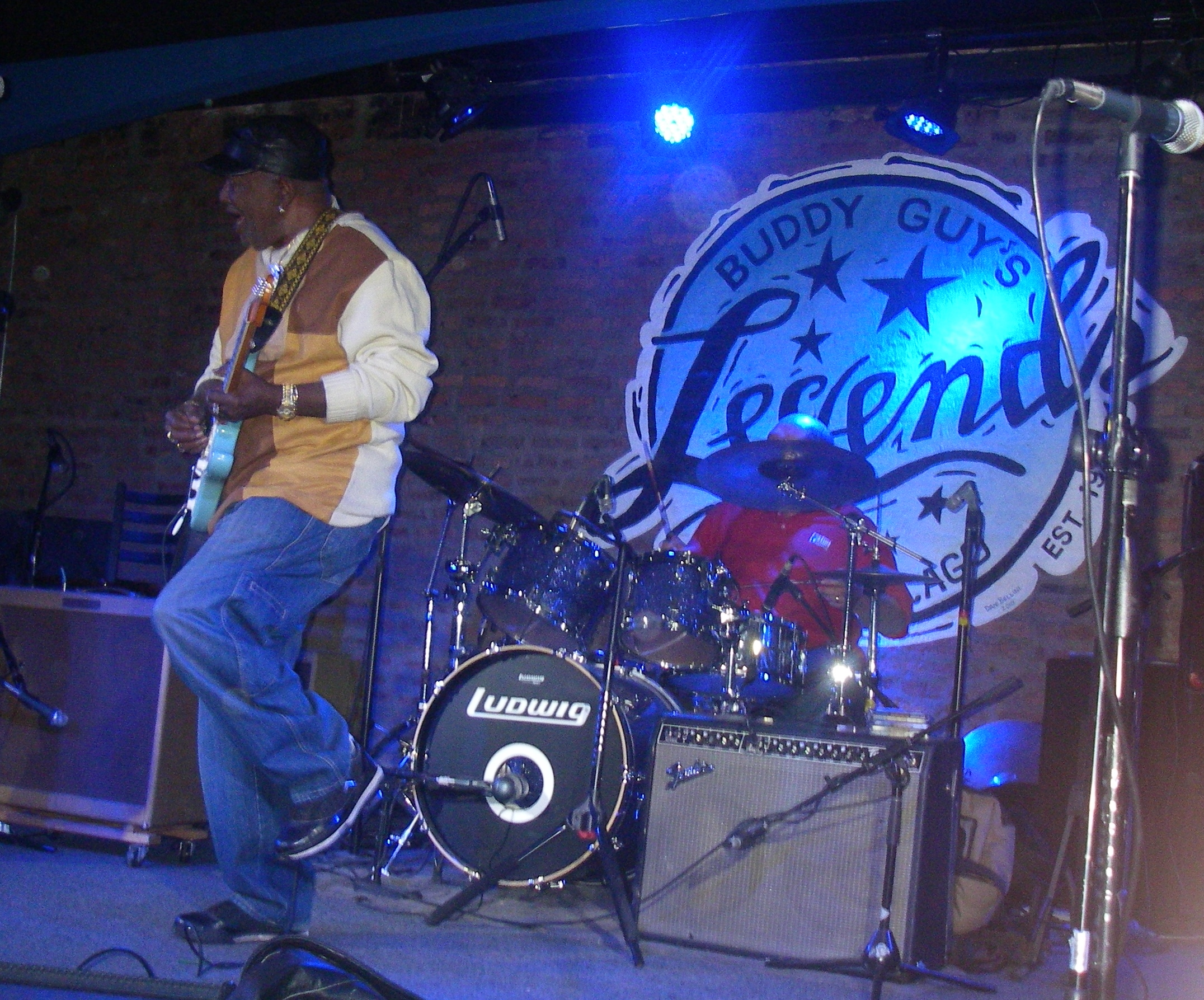
- Alexander in performance, 2012

Background information
- Also known as: Hoochie Man
- Born: July 23, 1942; Holly Springs, Mississippi, U.S.
- Died: February 22, 2025 (aged 82) Chicago, Illinois, U.S.
- Genres: Chicago blues, electric blues
- Occupations: Musician, songwriter
- Instruments: Guitar, vocals
- Years active: 1960-2025
- Labels: Delmark, Linsey Alexander, the L.A.B.B.
- Website: http://www.linseyalexander.com

Linsey Alexander (July 23, 1942 – February 22, 2025) was an American blues songwriter, vocalist, and guitarist. He was a fixture in clubs on Chicago's North Side for nearly two decades and played with numerous blues musicians, including Buddy Guy, A.C. Reed, Magic Slim, and B.B. King.

== Life and career ==
Alexander was born in Holly Springs, Mississippi, in an area along the Mississippi Blues Trail. His family was "poor but honest and hardworking" sharecroppers. He moved to Memphis, Tennessee, with his mother and a sister when he was 12 years old.

Alexander's interest in music started when a family friend he knew only as Otis taught him enough that when Otis left his guitar as a gift at Alexander's home, he was able pick it up and play. Alexander concentrated on singing as a teenager and later developed his guitar playing. His early influences were blues, country music, and rock and roll, including the blues keyboardist Rosco Gordon and the rock-and-roll artists Chuck Berry and Elvis Presley.

In Mississippi, Alexander worked as a porter in a hotel laundry room and later as a bicycle technician. In 1959, he pawned his first guitar to help pay his way to Chicago by Greyhound bus, following a girl he had met in Memphis. In Chicago, he had a series of jobs, working for a car dealer, at a gas station, and as a cook and busboy. He received a pension after he was wounded while working for the Chicago Police Department.

Alexander was pulled into the Chicago South Side music scene, where he heard soul artists like McKinley Mitchell and Bobby Day and the bluesman Howlin' Wolf. His first guitar was never recovered from the pawnshop, but he bought another guitar and formed a band, the Hot Tomatoes, which was "good enough to enter a talent show at the well-known nightclub on 63rd Street called The Place." Alexander went on to form another band, the Equitable Band, which played at the Launching Pad, at 75th Street and Stony Island, for about eight years. When Alexander was playing at Red's, a Chicago club at 35th Street and Archer, he was approached by an agent who introduced him to the popular North Side blues clubs B.L.U.E.S. and Kingston Mines. His entry into "Blue Chicago" (downtown) exposed him to tourists to whom he started selling independently recorded CDs, which are still selling well. Alexander was a fixture in Chicago North Side clubs for nearly two decades and played with blues notables including Buddy Guy, A.C. Reed, Magic Slim, and B.B. King. He performed for audiences in New York, Canada, and Europe and appeared at the Mississippi Blues Festival. Alexander was a regular performer at Kingston Mines.

Alexander died in Chicago on February 22, 2025, at the age of 82.

== Music and performance style ==
Music critic Jim White called Alexander a "still-present, real-deal bluesman" with "deep, rich, gritty vocals" and "guitar work as strong as his vocals." Alexander plays his own style of electric blues, influenced by soul, R&B, and funk. The original material he wrote contributed to the survival of the blues genre. His sense of humor shown in his music and his act set him apart from most other blues players. He was known for playing his guitar "with the energy of a 20 year old." Reviewer Greg Szalony wrote that "at times [Alexander's] vocal approach is more akin to talking than singing" and noted that his "distorted guitar tones" and vocals as "uncannily close to the late Son Seals."

The music critic David Whiteis wrote that Alexander's guitar style showed "lively improvisational imagination" and was in "good taste," saying Alexander was especially gifted as a songwriter "in command of a lyric vividness." Whiteis described Alexander's song "Saving Robert Johnson" as "a full-scale theatrical vignette set to music ... [that] take[s] on the crossroads myth." Greg Szalony observed that Alexander brings the blues into the present with the lyrics "I want you to e-mail the devil, I want you to poke him on Facebook." "Saving Robert Johnson" was included in the Mississippi Blues Project, a review of Mississippi blues produced by WXPN in Philadelphia.

The Chicago blues historian Karen Hanson wrote in 2007,

Veteran guitarist Linsey Alexander, the "Hoochie Man", plays classic Chicago blues spiced up with the occasional joke or double entendre. Watch him take his guitar for a crowd walk-through, where he'll stop often to flirt with the pretty women. ... These days Alexander is one of the hardest-working bluesmen in the city, appearing as many as six nights a week at Chicago clubs.

A critic described Alexander's music and live show as "loud, raw, rocked out and raucous". Another critic called Alexander a "character" and wrote that his live show was "not to be missed."

As of 2014, the Linsey Alexander Blues Band included Alexander as vocalist and guitarist, Breezy Rodio on guitar, and Ronald Simmons on bass.

== Awards ==
- A1 Blues Podcast called Alexander's first international release, Been There Done That, "pure blues of the finest quality" and named it "Blues CD of the Year".
- Big City Blues honored Alexander with a "Best Fan Interaction" award in 2012.
- On June 8, 2014, Alexander was inducted into the Chicago Blues Hall of Fame at the blues club Buddy Guy's Legends.

== Discography ==
- Someone's Cookin' in My Kitchen (2004), Linsey Alexander/The L.A.B.B.
- My Days Are So Long (2006 [2009]), Hoochie Man Music
- If You Ain't Got It (2010), Hoochie Man Music
- Been There Done That (2012), Delmark Records
- Come Back Baby (2014), Delmark Records
- Two Cats (2017), Delmark Records
- Live At Rosa's (2020), Delmark Records
