= Sam Myers =

American musician (born 1936)

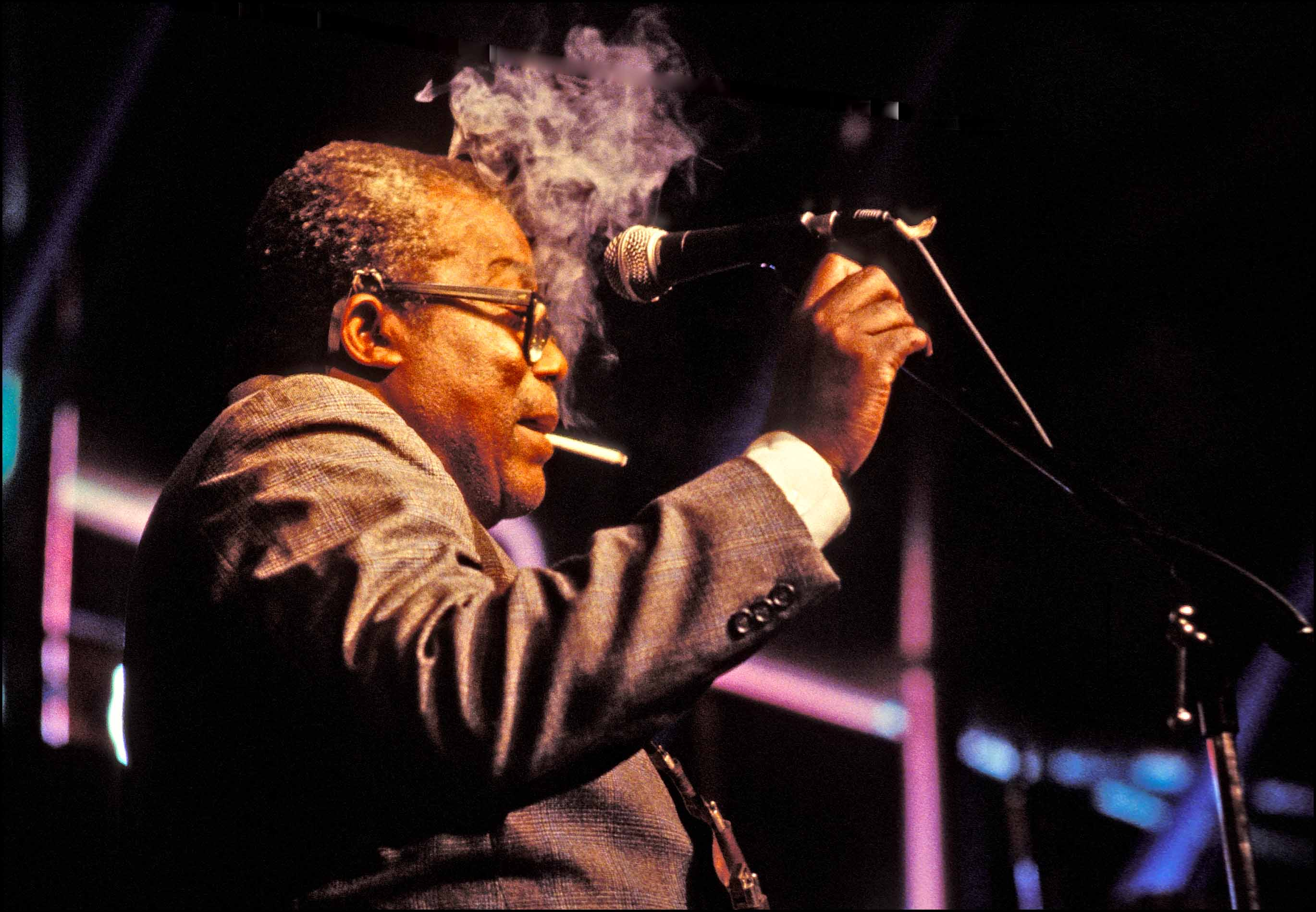
- Myers in concert, 2006

Background information
- Born: Samuel Joseph Myers; February 19, 1936; Laurel, Mississippi, United States
- Died: July 17, 2006 (aged 70) Dallas, Texas, United States
- Genres: Blues
- Occupations: Musician, songwriter
- Instruments: Vocalist, drums, blues harp
- Website: www.sweetsammyers.com

Samuel Joseph Myers (February 19, 1936 – July 17, 2006) was an American blues musician and songwriter. He was an accompanist on dozens of recordings by blues artists over five decades. He began his career as a drummer for Elmore James but was most famous as a blues vocalist and blues harp player. For nearly two decades he was the featured vocalist for Anson Funderburgh & the Rockets.

== Biography ==
Myers was born in Laurel, Mississippi, United States. He acquired juvenile cataracts at age seven and was left legally blind for the rest of his life, despite corrective surgery. He could make out shapes and shadows, but could not read print at all; he was taught Braille.

He acquired an interest in music while a schoolboy in Jackson, Mississippi, and became skilled enough at playing the trumpet and drums that he received a nondegree scholarship from the American Conservatory of Music (formerly the American Conservatory School of Music) in Chicago. Myers attended school by day and at night frequented the nightclubs of the South Side.

There he met and was sitting in with Jimmy Rogers, Muddy Waters, Howling Wolf, Little Walter, Hound Dog Taylor, Robert Lockwood, Jr., and Elmore James. Myers played drums with Elmore James on a fairly steady basis from 1952 until James's death, in 1963, and is credited on many of James's historic recordings for Chess Records. In 1956, Myers wrote and recorded what was to be his most famous single, "Sleeping in the Ground", a song that has been covered by Blind Faith, Eric Clapton, Robert Cray, and many other blues artists; it was also featured on Bob Dylan's Theme Time Radio Hour show on "Sleep".

From the early 1960s until 1986, Myers worked clubs in and around Jackson and across the South in the (formerly) racially segregated string of venues known as the Chitlin' Circuit. He also toured the world with Sylvia Embry and the Mississippi All-Stars Blues Band.

In 1986, Myers met Anson Funderburgh, from Plano, Texas, and joined his band, The Rockets. Myers toured all over the US and the world with the Rockets, enjoying a partnership that endured until the time of his death, from complications due to surgery for throat cancer, on July 17, 2006, in Dallas, Texas. Just before Myers died, he toured as a solo artist in Sweden, Norway and Denmark, with the Swedish band Bloosblasters.

== Legacy ==
That same year, the University Press of Mississippi published Myers's autobiography, Sam Myers: The Blues is My Story. The writer Jeff Horton, whose work has appeared in Blues Revue and Southwest Blues, chronicled Myers's history and delved into his memories of life on the road.

== Awards ==
Myers and the Rockets collectively won nine W. C. Handy Awards, including three awards in the category Band of the Year and the 2004 award for Best Traditional Album of the Year. In 2005, Myers's album Coming from the Old School was nominated in the category Traditional Blues Album of the Year.

In January 2000, Myers was inducted into the Farish Street Walk of Fame in Jackson, Mississippi, an honor he shares with Dorothy Moore and Sonny Boy Williamson II. In 2006, just months before Myers died, the Governor of Mississippi presented him with the Governor's Award for Excellence in the Arts, and he was named the state's Blues Ambassador by the Mississippi Arts Commission.
