= Dennis Taylor (musician) =

American saxophonist (1953–2010)

- Born: November 13, 1953; Barton, Vermont, U.S.
- Died: October 17, 2010 (aged 56) Nashville, Tennessee, U.S.
- Genres: Jazz
- Instruments: Alto saxophone, tenor saxophone, baritone saxophone, clarinet

Dennis Taylor (November 13, 1953 – October 17, 2010) was an American musician, arranger, and author. He had recording credits on saxophone (alto, tenor, and baritone) as well as on clarinet and as an arranger.

== Career ==
Taylor was born in Barton, Vermont northeast of Montpelier. He studied music at the Berklee College of Music in Boston.

== Career ==
Taylor was known for his recordings with Delbert McClinton, Clarence "Gatemouth" Brown, Michelle Shocked, Buckwheat Zydeco, and many others. Taylor wrote a series of instructional books through Hal Leonard, a publishing company, in which he discussed blues playing, jazz playing, and phrasing. He played on five Grammy Award nominated albums and was a two-time nominee for the Nashville Music Awards, "Miscellaneous Wind Instrumentalist of the Year". He appeared on Austin City Limits, Country Music Hall of Fame 25th Anniversary Celebration, Texas Connection, In Concert, American Music Shop, and Crook & Chase. On April 30, 2010, Taylor appeared on Imus in the Morning.

A jazz educator, Taylor analyzed other players' styles and offered tips for emulating and understanding work from the masters of the instrument. Some of the saxophonists music explained by Taylor included King Curtis, Stanley Turrentine, and Eddie "Lockjaw" Davis. The final part of "Jazz Saxophone" features 17 solos with classic jazz standards including "Doxy", "Easy Living", "Maiden Voyage" and "So What," as well as a wide variety of forms and styles (minor blues, soul jazz, 3/4 time, and bebop). The theory lessons cover the common major scale, minor scale, dominant, pentatonic chords and scales plus modes, as well as altered dominant scales and diminished options. Taylor wrote three other instructional books: Amazing Phrasing, Blues Saxophone, and Jazz Saxophone.

Taylor was also an educator who taught at Johnson State College in Johnson, Vermont southeast of St. Albans, and taught private saxophone lessons in Nashville until his death. He was a volunteer teacher for 18 of the 20 years that he lived in Nashville, at W.O. Smith Music School in Nashville, which provides lessons for students who can not afford regular private lessons. He is survived by both of his parents, as well as his wife, songwriter and publicist, Karen Leipziger.

== Discography ==
Taylor's first solo recording which received help from Kevin McKendree, also of McClinton's band, was completed shortly before his death. The recording featured saxophone, organ and drums, some of Taylor's original compositions, and also a guest appearance by Delbert McClinton. There are no details on the release. He appeared as a side-man on countless albums (see below for a partial list).

== Published works ==
- Hal Leonard Tenor Saxophone Method Jazz Saxophone: Tenor (Hal Leonard Corp.) – ISBN 978-1-4234-2634-9
- Jazz Saxophone (Hal Leonard Corp.) – ISBN 0-634-05849-5, ISBN 978-0-634-05849-3
- Blues Saxophone (Hal Leonard Corp.) – ISBN 0-634-02620-8, ISBN 978-0-634-02620-1
- Amazing Phrasing (Hal Leonard Corp.) – ISBN 0-634-03540-1, ISBN 978-0-634-03540-1

== Session work (partial list) ==
- Clarence "Gatemouth" Brown – Real Life (Live) CD – 1987 (Horn Arrangements, Tenor Saxophone)
- Buckwheat Zydeco – Taking It Home – 1988 (Tenor Saxophone, Baritone Saxophone)
- Clarence "Gatemouth" Brown – Standing My Ground – 1989 (Tenor Saxophone)
- Buckwheat Zydeco – Where There's Smoke There's Fire – 1990 (Tenor Saxophone)
- Various Artists – Best of Mountain State Live Vol. 1 – 1991 (Saxophone)
- Michelle Shocked – Arkansas Traveller – 1991 (Tenor Saxophone)
- Clarence "Gatemouth" Brown – No Looking Back – 1992 (Tenor Saxophone)
- Buckwheat Zydeco – Menagerie: The Essential Zydeco Collection, Mango – 1993 Island Records, Inc.
- Big Mike Griffin – Give Me What I Got Comin' – 1993 (Tenor Saxophone)
- Clarence "Gatemouth" Brown – Timeless, HighTone Records 8174, 2004
- Earl Gaines – Everything's Gonna Be Alright, CD – 1998
- Big Blues Extravaganza! The Best of Austin City Limits – Sony Music Entertainment 489928 2 – CD – 1998
- Roscoe Shelton – Let's Work Together (Alto Saxophone, Tenor Saxophone, Baritone Saxophone)
- Eddy Clearwater – Reservation Blues – 2000 (Tenor Saxophone, Soloist)
- Clifford Curry – She Shot a Hole in My Soul Again! – 2001 (Tenor Saxophone)
- Eddy Clearwater – Rock 'n Roll City – 2003 (Tenor Saxophone, Baritone Saxophone)
- Various Artists – Box of the Blues – 2003 (Tenor Saxophone)
- Robert Gordon – Satisfied Mind – 2004 (Saxophone)
- Hacienda Brothers – Hacienda Brothers – 2005 (Guest Appearance, Saxophone)
- Webb Wilder – About Time – 2005 (Saxophone)
- Al Garner – Get Out Blues – 2007 (Saxophone)
- Eddy Clearwater – West Side Strut – 2008 (Baritone Saxophone, Tenor Saxophone)
- Mike Farris – Shout! Live – 2009 (Clarinet, Saxophone)
- Clarence "Gatemouth" Brown – Essential Recordings: Flippin' Out – 2009 (Tenor Saxophone)
- Delbert McClinton – Acquired Taste – 2009 (Tenor Saxophone)
- Murali Croyell – Sugar Lips – 2009 (Saxophone)
- Mark Robinson – Quit Your Day Job – Play Guitar – 2010
- Duke Robillard – New Blues For Modern Man, Shanachie Records – Shanachie 9017
- Dennis Taylor – Steppin' Up, Kizybosh Records (Saxophone, co-Producer, Composer) – 2011
- Big Joe and the Dynaflows – You Can't Keep a Big Man Down, Severn Records (Saxophone) – 2011
- Earl Gaines – You Got the Walk, (Saxophone) – 2011
