= Dany Franchi =

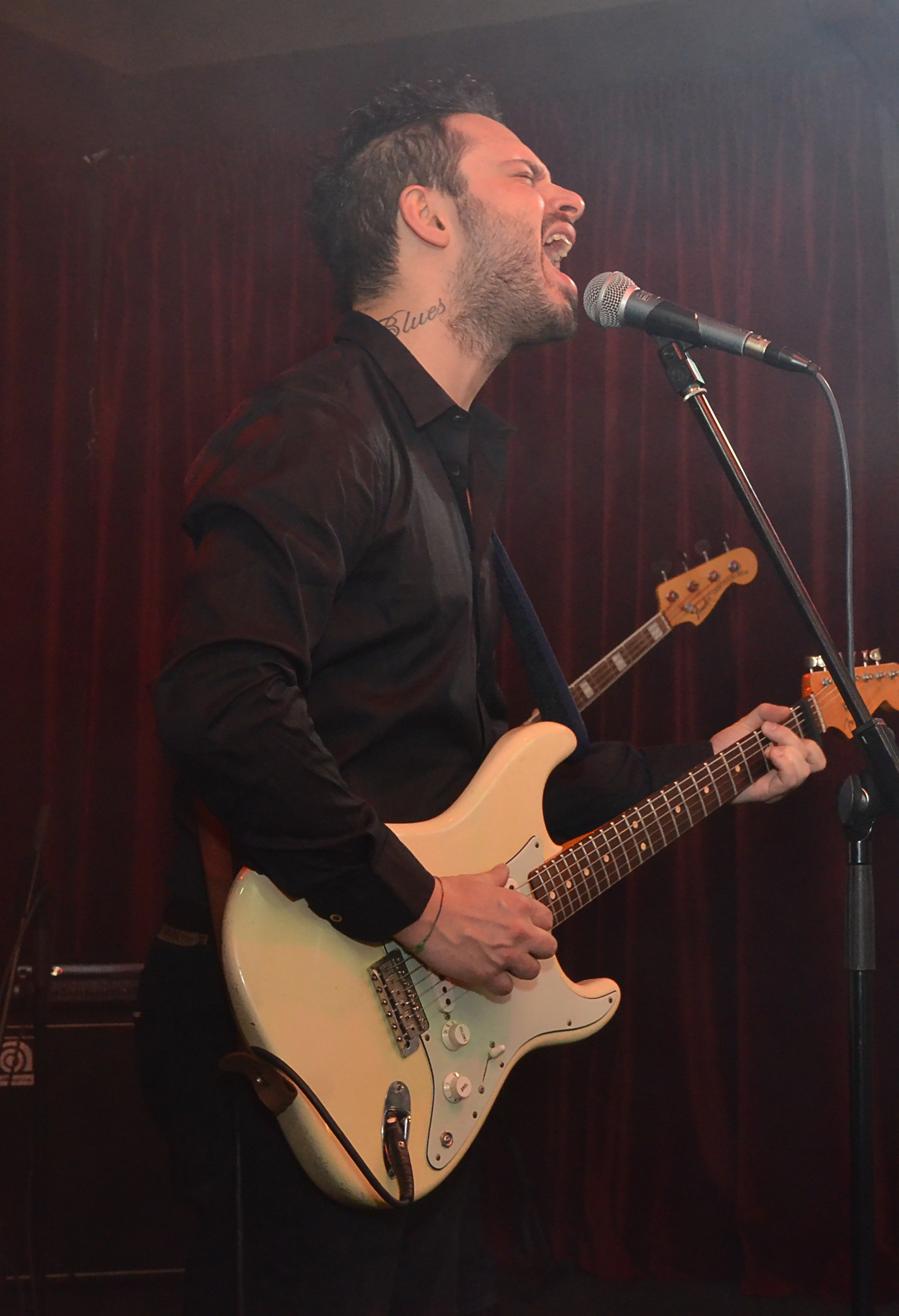

Background information
- Born: 3 February 1990 (age 36); Genoa, Italy
- Genres: Electric blues
- Occupations: Guitarist, singer, songwriter
- Instruments: Guitar, vocals
- Years active: 2008–present
- Label: Station House Records
- Website: www.danyfranchi.com

Dany Franchi (born 3 February 1990) is an Italian electric blues guitarist, singer and songwriter. Franchi has recorded three albums to date, with the first two crediting his backing band. His third studio album, Problem Child (2018), peaked at number 4 in the Billboard Top Blues Albums Chart.

Anson Funderburgh stated that "Dany is one of my favourite young blues artists. He has an exciting, fresh approach to the music while keeping it honest."

== Life and career ==
Franchi was born in Genoa, Italy. In 2008, he graduated with a degree in music gained in Milan, and soon thereafter commenced his professional career in music. In 2011, he won the Blues for Youth Award in his homeland. His debut effort entitled, Free Feeling, was released in 2012. The collection featured his fellow Italians, Paolo Bonfanti and Guitar Ray, along with the 2007 International Blues Challenge winner and Ohio resident Sean Carney.

In February 2014, Franchi relocated to the United States and recorded his second album I Believe, which was recorded in Cadiz, Ohio, with Carney producing the album. In January, 2016, Franchi and his backing band reached the semi-final of the International Blues Challenge in Memphis, Tennessee. Later the same year, he played at the Dallas International Guitar Festival. Between 2016 and 2017, Franchi appeared at other blues festivals, including the Doheny Blues Festival (California), Blues from the Top (Colorado, United States), Blues 'n Jazz Rallye (Rapperswil, Switzerland), Olsztyn Blues Festival (Olsztyn, Poland), and the Augustibluus Festival (Haapsalu, Estonia).

In February 2017, Anson Funderburgh and Don Ritter agreed to produce Franchi's third album Problem Child. The recording took place at Stuart Sullivan’s Wire Recording Studio in Austin, Texas. The album was released on 18 May 2018, on Kara Grainger's own label, Station House Records. The collection contained 13 tracks, mostly written by Franchi. Three of the tracks were cover versions. The instrumental "Sensation" was a re-wording of Freddie King's "Sen-Sa-Shun". The others included Eddie Taylor's "Big Town Playboy," and the Willie Dixon and Little Walter penned "Everything Gonna Be Alright." Problem Child, peaked at number 4 in the Billboard Top Blues Albums Chart in June 2018.

== Equipment ==
Franchi uses GHS strings on his Fender Stratocaster guitar.

== Discography ==
Year	Title	Record label	Credited as
2012	Free Feeling	Self-released	Dany Franchi Band
2014	I Believe	CD Baby	Dany Franchi Band
2018	Problem Child	Station House Records	Dany Franchi

== See also ==
- List of electric blues musicians
