= John Cocuzzi =

American jazz musician

John Cocuzzi (born 1964) is an American jazz, blues, and swing musician who specializes in the vibraphone and piano, as well as drums. His primary influences on vibraphone are Lionel Hampton and Red Norvo, while his piano playing is influenced by piano greats from both the jazz and blues worlds.

Cocuzzi is originally from Maryland but is best known in the Washington, D.C. area. He has been a member of Big Joe & the Dynaflows, and of the Big Three Trio with Big Joe Maher and John Previti in Washington, D.C. He also performs at jazz festivals nationwide (and sometimes in Europe).

While on tour, he has shared the stage with jazz musicians including Harry Allen, Houston Person, Eddie Locke, Barbara Morrison, Peter Appleyard, boogie-woogie piano great Bob Seeley, Howard Alden, Dick Hyman, John Pizzarelli, Johnny Frigo, Jake Hanna, Butch Miles, Russell Malone, Joe Wilder, Red Holloway, Bob Wilber, George Masso, Chuck Redd, and a host of others, including Louis Bellson, Barrett Deems, Snooky Young, Marshal Royal, Billy Butterfield, Milt Hinton, and Keter Betts.

Cocuzzi has played piano for Jimmy McCracklin, "Weeping" Tommy Brown, Jimmy "T-99" Nelson, Floyd Dixon, and Earl King. Cocuzzi's piano influences include Jelly Roll Morton, Fats Waller, Meade Lux Lewis, Professor Longhair, Nat King Cole and Erroll Garner.

Cocuzzi has recorded with Randy Reinhart, Randy Sandke, Ed Polcer, Ken Peplowski, Allan Vaché, Dan Barrett, John Allred, Russ Phillips, Andy Stein, Skitch Henderson, Bucky Pizzarelli, John Pizzarelli, James Chirillo, John Sheridan, Johnny Varro, Milt Hinton, Phil Flanigan, Frank Tate, Ed Metz, Jr., Joe Ascione, and Daryl Sherman.

On radio, Cocuzzi recorded a session for NPR's "Riverwalk: Live at The Landing" with the Jim Cullum Band. It was a tribute to Benny Goodman, "The Swing Shift: Jazz on Late-Night Radio", and featured Allan Vaché on clarinet with Nicholas Payton on trumpet.

For 15 years, he was the music director for the 219 Restaurant's Basin Street Lounge in Old Town, Alexandria, Virginia. He was also music director for the Crystal City Jazz Celebration (from 2003 to 2006), a jazz party in the style of Dick Gibson's Jazz Parties in Denver, Colorado.

== Select discography ==
With Bucky Pizzarelli and Skitch Henderson

- Skitch Henderson & Bucky Pizzarelli: Legends (Arbors Records)
- For All We Know piano/vocals (at CD Baby)
