= Mike Ledbetter =

American singer and guitarist (1985–2019)

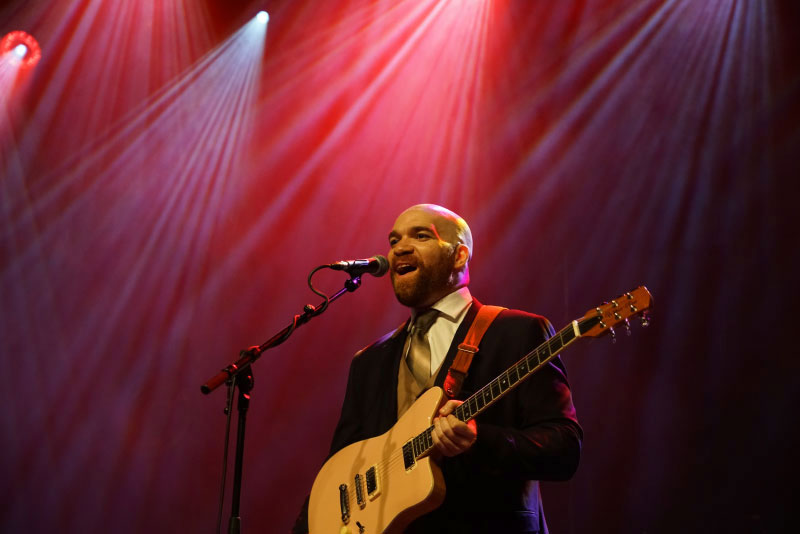
- Blues Heaven (2018 Denmark); Photo Hreinn Gudlaugsson

Background information
- Born: Michael David Ledbetter; April 27, 1985
- Origin: Elgin, Illinois, United States
- Died: January 21, 2019 (aged 33) Elgin, Illinois, United States
- Genre: Chicago blues
- Occupations: Singer, guitarist
- Years active: 2000s-2019
- Label: Delta Groove Productions
- Website: mikeledbetterbluesoul.com

Michael David Ledbetter (April 27, 1985 – January 21, 2019) was an American blues singer and guitarist.

== Biography ==
A distant relative of Lead Belly (Huddie Ledbetter), he grew up in Elgin, Illinois, United States, and attended Elgin High School. He trained as an opera singer, but was influenced by blues musicians such as Otis Rush and Buddy Guy, and began singing in clubs in and around Chicago. He joined the Nick Moss Band in 2010, and performed and recorded with the band for the next seven years, touring around the US and Europe.

In 2017, he started performing with the guitarist Monster Mike Welch, recording the album Right Place Right Time for which they won a Blues Music Award for best traditional blues album. Welch stated "... from the first time I heard Mike, I knew he was the kind of singer I've always been trying to play like." Ledbetter countered, "The way we played off each other was beautiful to me... Everything just fit perfectly." Right Time Right Place was released by Delta Groove Productions, and its track listing included a number of original songs and several cover versions. These latterly comprise the album's opening track, a cover of Elmore James' "Cry for Me Baby"; the Willie Dixon penned "I Can't Stop Baby"; alongside a reworking of the Jerry Leiber and Artie Butler song "Down Home Girl"; plus "Cryin' Won't Help You", which was an old B.B. King song.

He formed a band with Welch, the Welch-Ledbetter Connection. The band was nominated for a 2019 Blues Music Award for band of the year, and Ledbetter was nominated as vocalist of the year and "B.B. King Entertainer." On May 9, 2019, he won both individual awards, along with band of the year.

Ledbetter died at home in Elgin in January 2019, aged 33, as a result of a "sudden medical emergency", which was later confirmed as complications from epilepsy.
