= Richard Ray Farrell =

American singer (born 1956)

- Born: 1956 (age 69–70); Niagara Falls, New York, U.S.
- Genres: Electric blues
- Occupations: Musician, singer, songwriter
- Instruments: Guitar, harmonica, vocals
- Years active: 1970s–present
- Labels: Various including Stormy Monday Records, Blue Beet Music and CD Baby
- Website: Official website

Richard Ray Farrell (born 1956) is an American electric blues musician, singer and songwriter. Farrell has released ten albums in his own name to date, and has toured widely over a career that started in the mid-1970s.

== Life and career ==
Farrell was born in Niagara Falls, New York, but left home after his graduation, backpacking his way across Europe. He found 'work' as a busker on the Paris Métro. In 1976, Farrell met Sugar Blue whilst they were both busking in the Métro. Farrell's first instrument was the harmonica, graduating then to the guitar to accompany his singing.

In 1978, he briefly fronted a Spanish blues-rock band in Spain, and lived with a gypsy family for six months. After becoming a father in 1985, he relocated to Stuttgart, Germany, and played with a local blues band. In 1987, Richard opened for Joe Cocker at the Backnang Open Air Festival. Two years later he led his own Richard Ray Farrell Band, and started touring across Europe. Through connections he toured with Lazy Lester, Big Jack Johnson, Big Boy Henry, Louisiana Red, Frank Frost and R. L. Burnside between 1990 and 1993, during which time Farrell released his debut album, Live in Germany (1992). In 1993, he formed an outfit known as Street Talk, but the members lived across the Northern Hemisphere, making commitment impossible. Farrell returned to both solo acoustic performances and playing with his electric blues trio. In 1995, Farrell and Jimmy Carl Black formed the Farrell and Black Band, who recorded two albums for Stormy Monday Records, Cataract Jump (1996) and Black Limousine (1999). He honed his songwriting skills on these albums and then released Street Songs, Jazzy Tunes and Down Home Blues (1998).

Farrell returned to the States in 2001, and two years later issued his first album for Blue Beet Music, Bohemian Life. Featuring sixteen original songs, it included a guest appearance by the harmonica player, Jerry Portnoy. Bohemian Life reached number 18 on the Living Blues radio chart. Acoustic Roots (2005) followed, which peaked at number 20 on the Living Blues chart. In 2006, Farrell teamed up with Steve Guyger to produce the traditional blues-orientated, Down Home Old School Country Blues. Stuck On The Blues (2007) was another largely acoustic joint affair, this time with the Italian harmonicist, Marco Pandolfi. Camino de Sanlucar (2009) was recorded in Seville, Spain.

His next release, I Sing The Blues Eclectic (2011), contained twelve original tracks. In 2013, Farrell issued At Cambayá Club, a live album with Farrell providing guitar, harmonica and vocals throughout. Shoe Shoppin’ Woman (Blue Beet, 2014) is his most recent offering, and contained cover versions of Elmore James' "Wild About You", and Snooks Eaglin's "If I Could".

Farrell's favorite statement is "The blues will never die because it's not a fad, it's more a way of life."

== Discography ==
=== Albums ===
Year	Title	Record label
1992	Live in Germany	Maule & Gosch Records
2000	Street Songs, Jazzy Tunes and Down Home Blues	Stormy Monday Records
2002	Bohemian Life	Blue Beet
2005	Acoustic Roots	Blue Beet
2006	Down Home Old School Country Blues (with Steve Guyger)	Blue Beet
2007	Stuck on the Blues (with Marco Pandolfi)	Blue Beet
2009	Camino de Sanlucar	CD Baby
2011	I Sing the Blues Eclectic	Emphasis Records
2013	At Cambayá Club	Cambayá Records
2014	Shoe Shoppin' Woman	CD Baby

== See also ==
- List of electric blues musicians
