= Anson Funderburgh =

American blues guitarist (born 1954)

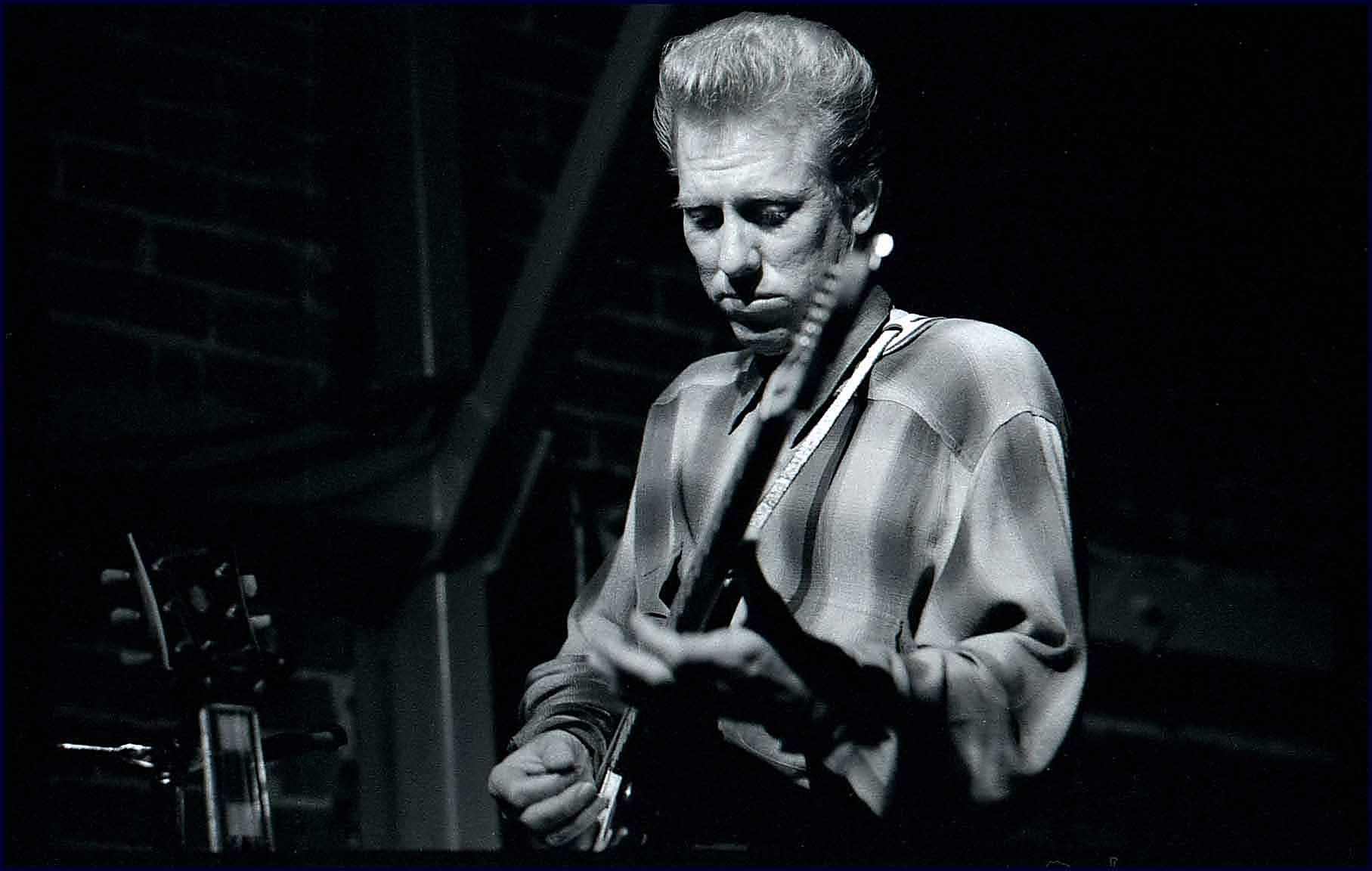

Background information
- Born: James Anson Funderburgh; November 14, 1954 (age 71); Plano, Texas, United States
- Genres: Blues
- Occupation: Guitarist
- Instruments: Guitar, vocals
- Years active: 1978–present
- Labels: Various
- Website: www.ansonandtherockets.com

Anson Funderburgh (born James Anson Funderburgh; November 14, 1954) is an American blues guitar player and bandleader of Anson Funderburgh and the Rockets since 1978. The band's style incorporates both Chicago blues and Texas blues.

== Career ==
Funderburgh was born in Plano, Texas, United States. Anson was with The Bee's Knees in 1976 and recorded Cold Hearted Woman. In 1977 the Rockets began with Anson, Mark Hickman on Fender bass, David Watson on drums and vocalist Darrell Nulisch. In 1981, Funderburgh released the Rockets' debut album Talk to You By Hand from New Orleans, Louisiana based Black Top Records. The band consisted of Anson, with Darrell Nulisch on vocals and harmonica. The album included a cover version of Earl King's song, "Come On (Let the Good Times Roll)". Talk to You By Hand was also the first ever release by the Black Top record label.

Before the debut album's release in 1981, Funderburgh participated that same year with The Fabulous Thunderbirds in recording of their Butt Rockin' album.

Funderburgh and the Rockets appeared at the 1984 San Francisco Blues Festival. When Nulisch left the band in 1985, Funderburgh invited the blues harmonica player Sam Myers from Jackson, Mississippi to fill in the spot. Myers stayed with the band until his death on July 17, 2006, appearing on eight albums with them. The first Rockets recording featuring Myers was My Love Is Here To Stay, released in 1985.

Funderburgh and the Rockets appeared in the 1994 film China Moon, starring Ed Harris and Madeleine Stowe. They are shown playing "Tell Me What I Want To Hear" from the self-titled release. As well as the studio recordings, in 1990 the band played the Long Beach Blues Festival. The same year, they appeared on show number 109 of the NBC television program, Sunday Night.

In 1989 and 1990 the band's bassist was Mike Judge, future animator and creator of Beavis and Butt-head and King of the Hill. Their song "Can We Get Together" was also featured in the film, 21 Grams in 2003.

In 2007, Funderburgh played on and produced John Németh's album, Magic Touch. Németh had briefly replaced Myers in Funderburgh's backing band.

In 2011, The Mill Block Blues album was released. The CD was unique in that a portion of the sales of the album was donated to help fellow musicians in need via the HART Fund (Handy Artist Relief Trust), a service provided by the Blues Foundation that provides for acute, chronic, and preventive medical and dental care as well as funeral expenses for blues musicians.

October 2012 saw the first U.S. and European tour of 'Golden State Lone Star Blues Revue', an all star package that included Funderburgh; Little Charlie Baty on guitar; former Rockets drummer Wes Starr; bassist Richard W. Grigsby; and leader, harmonicist, and singer Mark Hummel. The quintet were first featured on Hummel's 2014 Electro-Fi Records release The Hustle Is Really On, which was nominated for a Blues Music Award for 'Best Traditional Blues Album' in 2015.

In 2013, Funderburgh produced and featured on The Andy T–Nick Nixon Band's Drink Drank Drunk, released on Delta Groove.

In 2014, he was nominated for a Blues Music Award in the 'Best Instrumentalist – Guitar' category.

More recently, Funderburgh co-produced Dany Franchi's album, Problem Child (2018). He also produced Breezy Rodio's 2022 album, Underground Blues.

== Discography ==
- 1981: Talk to You By Hand with Darrell Nulisch (Black Top 1001)
- 1983: She Knocks Me Out! with Darrell Nulisch (Black Top 1022)
- 1984: Harpoon Man with Fingers Taylor (Red Lightnin' 0058)
- 1985: My Love Is Here To Stay with Sam Myers (Black Top 1032)
- 1987: Sins (Black Top 1038)
- 1989: Rack 'Em Up (Black Top 1049)
- 1991: Tell Me What I Want to Hear (Black Top 1068)
- 1992: Thru the Years: A Retrospective (Black Top 1077) compilation
- 1995: Live at the Grand Emporium (Black Top 1111)
- 1997: That's What They Want with Sam Myers (Black Top 1140)
- 1998: Grand Union with Otis Grand, Debbie Davies (Blueside; Valley Entertainment)
- 1999: Change In My Pocket (Bullseye Blues/Rounder 9573)
- 2003: Which Way Is Texas? (Bullseye Blues/Rounder 9619)
- 2006: Blast Off: The Best of Anson Funderburgh & The Rockets (Shout! Factory) compilation
- 2007: Magic Touch (John Németh) produced, featured on
- 2011: Mill Block Blues (Ruff Kutt Blues Band) produced, featured on
- 2013: Deal With It (4 Jacks: Big Joe Maher, Anson Funderburgh, Kevin McKendree, Steve Mackey) (EllerSoul)
- 2013: Drink Drank Drunk (The Andy T–Nick Nixon Band) (Delta Groove Productions) produced, featured on
- 2014: The Hustle Is Really On (Mark Hummel) (Electro-Fi) featured on
- 2016: Golden State Lone Star Blues Revue (Mark Hummel, Little Charlie Baty, Anson Funderburgh, Wes Starr, R.W. Grigsby) (Electro-Fi) produced, featured on

== See also ==
- List of blues musicians
