= Severn Records =

American record label

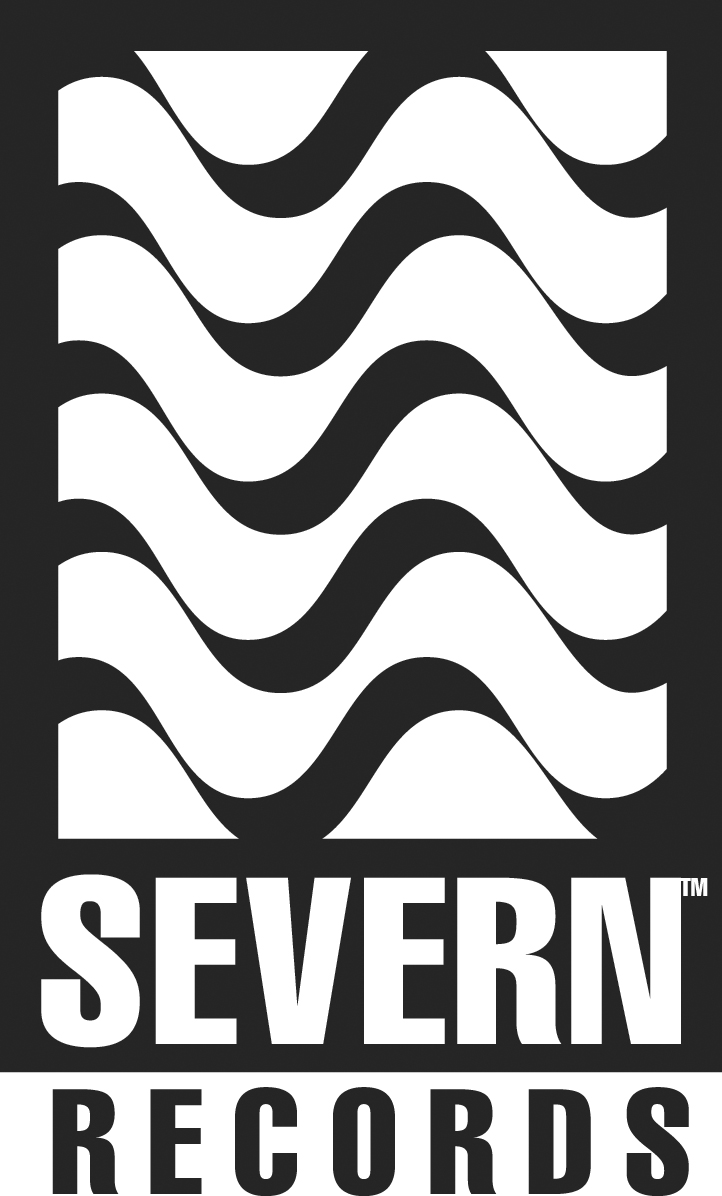
- Founded: 1998
- Founder: David Earl
- Distributor: City Hall Records
- Genre: Blues; jazz; soul
- Country of origin: U.S.
- Location: Annapolis, Maryland
- Official website: severnrecords.com

Severn Records is an American independent record label that concentrates on blues music. Its motto is "Roots Music for the 21st Century".

== History ==
On July 11, 1997, a company named Echo Records was incorporated in Maryland by David Earl. By the time of its founding and first releases in 1998, the new company had changed its name to Severn Records. This change eliminated any possibility of confusion with Ecko Records.

=== Founding in Crownsville, Maryland ===
Severn released three albums in 1998: Darrell Nulisch's The Whole Truth, Big Joe Maher's I'm Still Swinging, and Benjie Porecki's Servin' It Up. The demise of Black Top Records had left the first two of these artists available to record on the new label. Subsequently, they have recorded six more albums with Severn. Porecki has recorded two more albums and provided keyboard backup on many Severn projects. In 1999, Severn reissued Steve Guyger's Past Life Blues. To produce these four albums, as well as ten more early ones, Severn made use of recording, mixing and mastering facilities at several commercial studios. Eventually, all these functions were carried out at a studio in the basement of Earl's house on the Severn River in Crownsville, Maryland.

=== Growth in Severn, Maryland ===
In 2001, Severn Records moved to Severn, Maryland. Here, its new offices were fitted out with better equipment, isolation booths, and rehearsal space. These facilities improved the production of albums and attracted new musicians to the label. These include: Mike Morgan, Sugar Ray Norcia, Lou Pride, and Tad Robinson. Together with the four founding artists, they have created the core albums of the Severn discography.

Soon, unaffiliated musicians came to use Severn's facilities and personnel for their own recording projects. One of these was Norwegian accordion player J. T. Lauritsen, who recorded his album Squeezboxing in 2006. Another project, in 2006, was Mikey Jr's Look Inside My Pocket.

In 2005, Severn sponsored the "Chicago Blues Harmonica Project", which spotlights veteran Chicago harmonica artists. From this association, came the album Diamonds in the Rough, which was followed, in 2009, by More Rare Gems. Later, Severn released another compilation, The Blind Owl, that documents the work of Alan Wilson with the band Canned Heat.

=== Tenth anniversary celebration ===
On September 27, 2008, Severn celebrated its 10th anniversary with a party at the Fish Head Cantina in Arbutus, Maryland. This event, which was co-sponsored by the Baltimore Blues Society, featured Guyger, Norcia, Nulisch, Maher, Morgan, Porecki, Pride, Robinson, The All Mighty Senators, Kevin Anker, Steve Gomes, Willie Henderson, Alex Schultz, Clarence Spady, Robb Stupka, and Monster Mike Welch.

=== Annapolis, Maryland ===
In 2010, Severn Records moved to Renard Court in Annapolis, Maryland. Here, new offices and studios were built by Winchester Construction Company.

The new facility opened in October 2011. It covers 3100 square feet devoted to offices, storage, and two studios. One of the studios incorporates a large tracking room, an isolation booth, and a control room, which is fitted out with a custom recording console. The other studio is intended as a room for editing and mastering, but it can also serve as a second isolation booth.

Since it opened its new facilities, Severn has signed The Fabulous Thunderbirds, The Nighthawks, and Mud Morganfield. It continues to record new albums by its established artists. In particular, Norcia's Evening was released on October 18, 2011. On March 20, 2012, Severn released Morganfield's Son of the Seventh Son, and reissues of two CDs by Jimmy Earl: Jimmy Earl, and Stratosphere. That month, Severn announced the signing of New Orleans–based blues guitarist/singer Bryan Lee and Baltimore-based soul and blues singer Ursula Ricks. Severn released the Nighthawk's Damn Good Time!, on May 15, 2012, the Thunderbird's On the Verge, on March 19, 2013, and Lee's Play One for Me, on September 19, 2013.

On January 21, 2014, Severn released another CD by Jimmy Earl, Renewing Disguises.

On June 5, 2012, Lou Pride died of natural causes while in hospice care. He had just finished recording his final album, Ain't No More Love in this House, which Severn released on October 15, 2013, along with My Street by Ricks.

== "That Severn Sound" ==
The title of this section quotes what J. T. Lauritsen said he wanted when he came to Severn. The paragraphs that follow describe some aspects of Severn's operations that contribute to its distinctive sound.

=== The Severn Studio Band ===
Severn maintains a house band, whose functions are to back up recording projects and to participate in promotional appearances. Its key members are Rob Stupka (drums), Steve Gomes (bass), Benjie Porecki and Kevin Anker (both keyboards). Gomes also serves as arranger, composer, and producer on many Severn releases. Three guitarists work with the band: Alex Schultz, Monster Mike Welch, and Johnny Moeller. Schultz created the Severn release Think About It. Welch, who was featured on Sugar Ray & the Bluetones, has recorded several albums on other labels. Moeller did Bloogaloo. He is lead guitarist for The Fabulous Thunderbirds, but he participates occasionally on his own projects with Severn, as well as on those of the Thunderbirds.

=== Key personnel and organizations ===
Many Severn albums feature horn sections working with the Studio Band. These have included members of the Memphis Horns, who appeared on many releases by Stax Records, and of The Airmen of Note, which is the premier jazz ensemble of the US Air Force. Willie Henderson plays a key role in arranging, producing, and conducting horn passages. Along similar lines, Robinson's A New Point of View features musicians from the Annapolis Symphony Orchestra. A very important component of the label's operations is Apple's iTunes Store, for Severn's complete catalog is available there. John Monforte, an electronics engineer from Miami, Florida, keeps Severn's computers and audio equipment in good repair and up to date. He made a major contribution to the design and construction of the Annapolis studios.

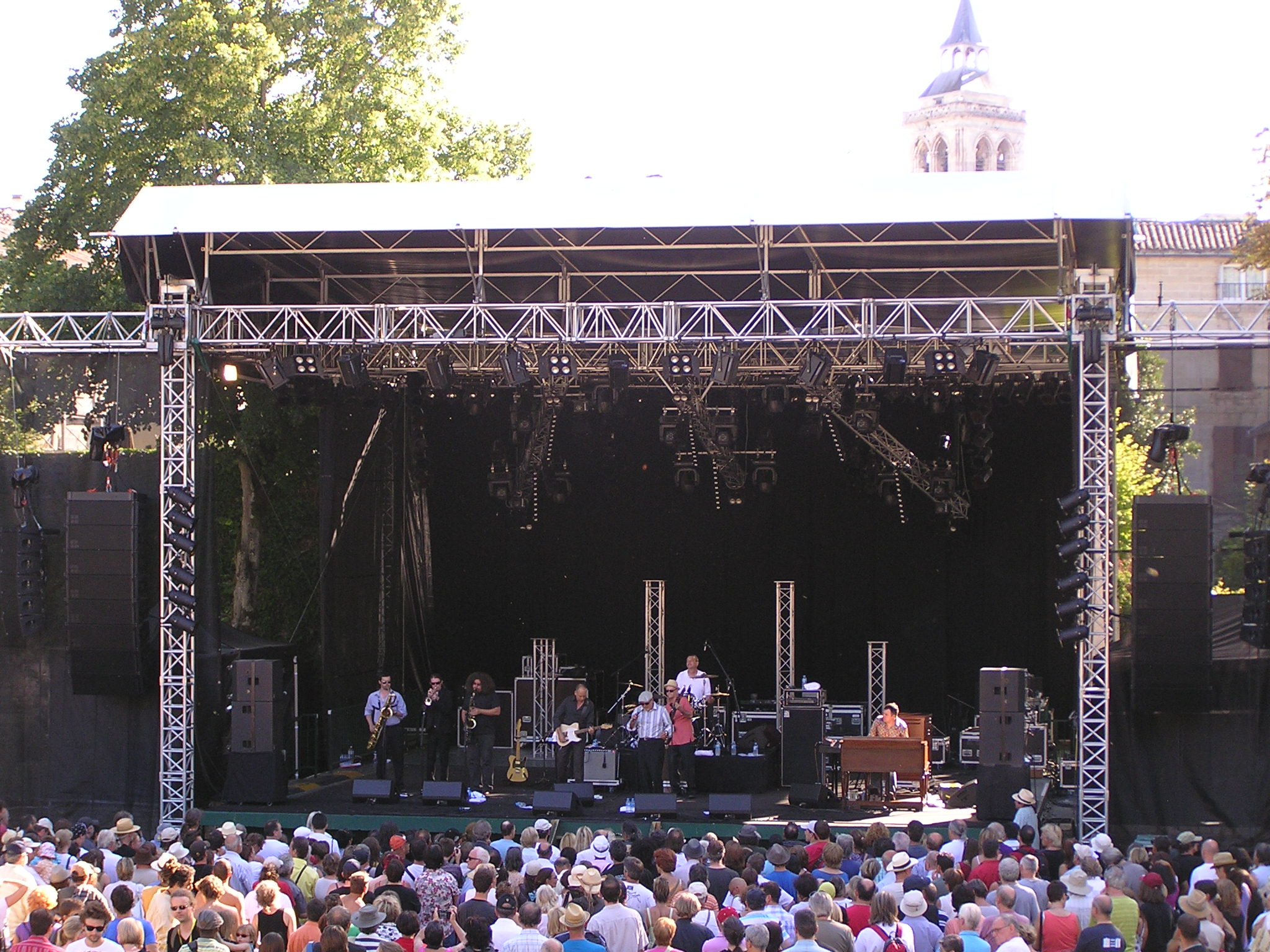
Lou Pride, Tad Robinson, and Darrell Nulisch performing with The Severn Soul Revue at the 2009 Cognac Blues Passions

== Touring with the Severn Soul Review ==
The Severn Soul Review refers to one or more Severn artists backed up by the Studio Band. Its main purpose is to promote Severn releases. It does this not only by performing locally and regionally, but also by touring the United States and Europe. In this role, it has appeared at many festivals. In particular, the Review appeared at the Lucerne Blues Festival (Switzerland) in 2010, 2008, and 2004. Lou Pride's appearance here in 2010 was a significant comeback, because he came to the festival in 2004, but had a heart attack before he could perform. The Severn Soul Review also appeared at the 2006 Beaches International Jazz Festival (Canada), the 2008 King Biscuit Blues Festival (Arkansas), the 2009 Cognac Blues Passions (France), and the 2009 Piazza Blues Festival (Switzerland).

== Awards ==
On November 1, 2011, the Blues Foundation announced that Severn had been chosen for one of its 2012 "Keeping the Blues Alive" awards. Over the years, the foundation has nominated Severn artists and albums for more than thirty five awards. The Washington Area Music Association has recognized Big Joe Maher with three "Wammie" awards as a vocalist and fifteen nominations, some of which were for his band, The Dynaflows.

== Discography ==
Steve Guyger

- 1999 – Past Life Blues, Reissue
- 2008 – Radio Blues

Darrell Nulisch

- 1998 – The Whole Truth
- 2000 – I Like It That Way
- 2003 – Times Like These
- 2007 – Goin' Back To Dallas
- 2009 – Just For You

Sugar Ray And The Bluetones

- 2001 – Rockin' Sugar Daddy
- 2003 – Sugar Ray & the Bluetones featuring Monster Mike Welch
- 2005 – Hands Across The Table
- 2007 – My Life, My Friends, My Music
- 2011 – Evening

Lou Pride

- 2002 – Words Of Caution
- 2003 – The Memphis / El Paso Sessions
- 2005 – Keep On Believing
- 2013 – Ain't No More Love In This House

Big Joe & The Dynaflows

- 1998 – I'm Still Swingin'
- 2000 – All Night Long
- 2011 – You Can't Keep A Big Man Down

Benjie Porecki

- 1998 – Servin' It Up
- 2001 – The Rest Of My Life
- 2001 – Small-Medium-Large, with the WPG Trio

Mike Morgan & The Crawl

- 2002 – Texas Man
- 2004 – Live In Dallas
- 2008 – Stronger Every Day

Tad Robinson

- 2004 – Did You Ever Wonder
- 2007 – A New Point Of View
- 2010 – Back In Style

Ken Clark Organ Trio

- 2003 – Eternal Funk
- 2005 – Mutual Respect

Jimmy Earl

- 2012 – Jimmy Earl, Reissue
- 2012 – Stratosphere, Reissue
- 2014 – Renewing Disguises

Compilation albums

- 2005 – Chicago Blues Harmonica Project, Diamonds in the Rough
- 2005 – Various artists, Roots Music for the 21st Century
- 2006 – All Mighty Senators, Checkered Past, New Tomorrow: Essential AMS
- 2009 – Chicago Blues Harmonica Project, More Rare Gems
- 2013 – Alan Wilson, The Blind Owl

Various artists

- 1999 – Ola Dixon, Labor Of Love
- 2000 – Roy Gaines, New Frontier Lover
- 2002 – Bruce Conte, Bullet Proof
- 2002 – Louisiana Red, A Different Shade Of Red
- 2003 – J Street Jumpers, Good For Stompin'
- 2003 – The Rockin' Highliners, Sputnik Café
- 2004 – Nora Jean Bruso, Going Back To Mississippi
- 2004 – Roy Carrier And The Night Rockers, Living Legend
- 2004 – Jelly Roll All-Stars, Must Be Jelly
- 2004 – The Bruce Katz Band, A Deeper Blue
- 2004 – The Joe Kap Organ Trio, Street Noise
- 2004 – Roy Tyler and New Directions. Three Way Calling
- 2004 – Alex Schultz, Think About It
- 2006 – Buck Hill, Relax
- 2008 – Clarence Spady, Just Between Us
- 2009 – Charles Wilson, Troubled Child
- 2010 – Johnny Moeller, Bloogaloo
- 2012 – Mud Morganfield, Son of the Seventh Son
- 2012 – The Nighthawks, Damn Good Time!
- 2013 – The Fabulous Thunderbirds, On the Verge
- 2013 – Bryan Lee, Play One for Me
- 2013 – Ursula Ricks, My Street
