= Johnny Moeller =

American guitarist (born 1970)

Background information
- Born: October 31, 1970 (age 55); Fort Worth, Texas, United States
- Genres: Blues, Texas blues
- Instrument: Guitar
- Years active: 1985-present

Johnny Moeller (born Jon Kelly Moeller, October 31, 1970) is an American guitarist, currently with the Fabulous Thunderbirds.

Born in Fort Worth, Texas, Johnny started playing guitar in his early teens. Over the years Moeller's main influences have been from Freddie King, Lightnin' Hopkins, Earl King and Grant Green to a wide variety of soul, funk and rock artists.

He began playing in Dallas and Fort Worth blues clubs while still in high school. During the summers Moeller and his year and a younger brother Jay Moeller, who plays drums traveled from their home in Denton down to Austin. The summer they were 16 and 15 they meet Clifford Antone of the Austin blues club Antone's. The first night Moeller played on Antone's stage was with Little Charlie & The Nightcats.

After Moeller finished high school in Denton he moved to Austin Texas working in many of the city's well known venues and often soaked in the music of the constant stream of blues, and rock artists performing at Antone's. Amongst those that played Antone's were Earl King, Albert Collins, and James Cotton.

Years later the Austin Chronicle quoted Clifford Antone (who also helped launch Stevie Ray Vaughan) as saying: "Johnny, nobody can burn like that kid. He's got the heart like Stevie had, about the only one I've seen with that kind of heart. Johnny's so quiet and bashful, just a sweet kid and sometimes those kids get overlooked."

By the time Moeller had joined the Fabulous Thunderbirds in mid-2007 he had toured North America, Europe, Australia, and Japan extensively. He remains based in Austin, Texas, with his wife Shontae Moeller and three children, playing local, and regional venues when he is not touring with the Fabulous Thunderbirds.

Moeller is rumored to be the inspiration for one of the characters in Mike Judge's Beavis and Butt-Head cartoon. The other character is modeled after Paul Size.

== Discography ==
- Johnny Moeller, along with friend Paul Size, later of the Red Devils, collaborated on a Dallas Blues Society Records release - Return of the Funky Worm (1996).
- Along with Paul Size and the Red Devils, worked with Mick Jagger on his still-unreleased album of traditional blues.
- Johnny's Blues Aggregation, Dallas Blues Society Records, (2001)
- Bloogaloo, Severn Records, (2010)
- Along with his brother Jay Moeller, collaborated on a Feelin' Good Records release - Triple Troubles (2010)
- The Fabulous Thunderbirds - Struck Down, Stony Plain Records, (2024)
