= Darrell Nulisch =

American singer (born 1952)

- Born: September 14, 1952 (age 73); Dallas, Texas, United States
- Genres: Texas blues, electric blues, contemporary blues, soul blues
- Occupations: Singer, harmonicist, songwriter
- Instruments: Vocals, harmonica
- Years active: Early 1980s-present
- Labels: Black Top, Severn Records

Darrell Nulisch (born September 14, 1952, Dallas, Texas) is an American electric blues singer and harmonica player. Prior to his solo career, he was a member of Anson Funderburgh and the Rockets and The Broadcasters. Nulisch's repertoire incorporates soul combined with R&B and Chicago blues, redesigned to complement his distinctive vocals.

== Biography ==
Nulisch was raised listening to Otis Redding and Al Green. In 1981 he was a founding member of Anson Funderburgh's Rockets and sang with them until 1985. He was then part of Mike Morgan's Crawl, before moving to Massachusetts and joining up with Ronnie Earl's Broadcasters in 1988.

He began his solo career late in 1990, relocating to Boston. James Cotton then asked him to sing with Cotton's band on tour, after Cotton had lost his own voice. Nulisch appeared on Otis Grand's 1996 album, Perfume and Grime, which also utilized Curtis Salgado, Luther Allison, and Joe Louis Walker.

Several of the songs in Nulisch's repertoire are his own, most of them written with Steve Gomes, who plays bass guitar in Texas Heat, the band that backed Nulisch for a number of years. Other band members included Benjie Porecki (piano), Johnny Moeller (guitar) and Robb Stupka (drums).

Nulisch issued I Like It That Way in 2000. His fan base started to expand from this point. His studio album, Just for You, was released in October 2009. It received a four star rating from AllMusic.

== Discography ==
- 1991: Business as Usual, Darrell Nulisch & Texas Heat (Black Top Records)
- 1996: Bluesoul (Higher Plane Music)
- 1998: Whole Truth (Severn Records)
- 2000: I Like It That Way (Severn)
- 2003: Times Like These (Severn)
- 2007: Goin' Back to Dallas (Severn)
- 2009: Just for You (Severn)
- 2014: One Night in Boston [live] (Nulisch Productions)
- 2018: The Bigtone Sessions, Volume One (Bigtone Records)

== See also ==
- List of Texas blues musicians
- List of electric blues musicians
