= The Nighthawks =

American music band

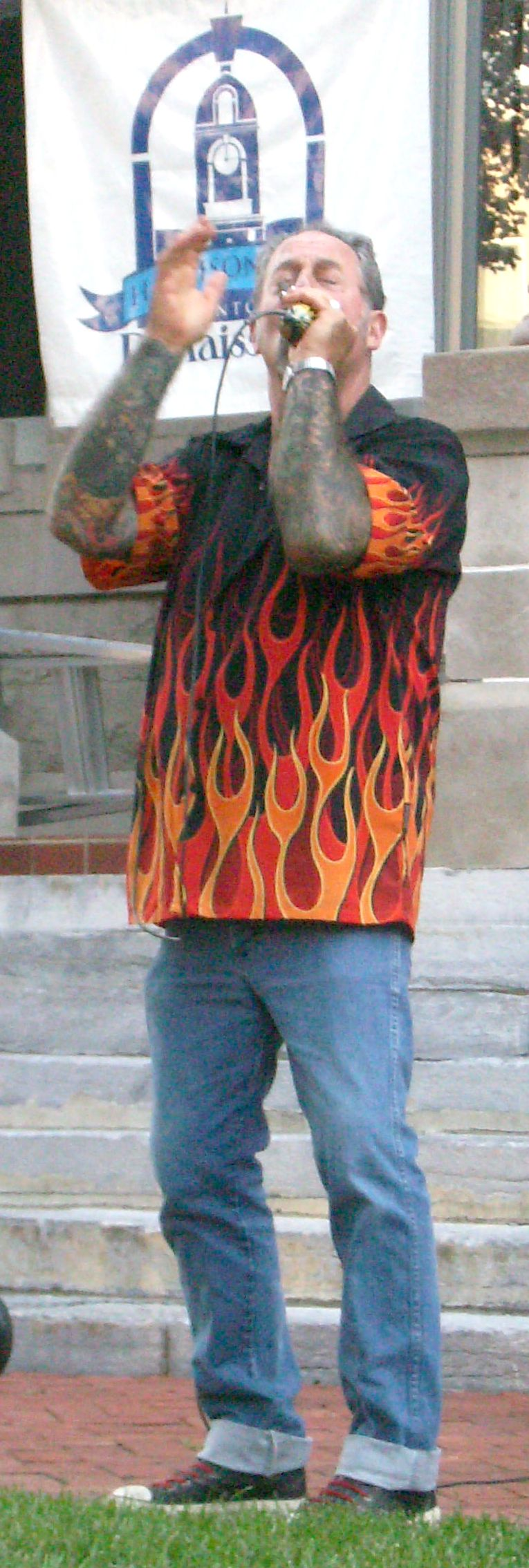
- Mark Wenner of The Nighthawks plays amplified harmonica Harrisonburg, Virginia July 11, 2008.

Background information
- Origin: Washington, D.C., United States
- Genres: Blues
- Years active: 1972–present
- Members: Mark Wenner; Paul Pisciotta; Zach Sweeney; Mark Stutso
- Past members: Jimmy Thackery; Jan Zukowski; Pete Ragusa; Warren Haynes; Jimmy Nalls; Jimmy Hall; Danny Morris; Pete Kanaras; Phil Petroff; Peter Bonta; Anton "Ace the Bass" Hansman; Larry Bolet; Bill Holland; Lee Smith
- Website: thenighthawks.com

The Nighthawks are an American blues and roots music band, based in Washington, D.C. As of 2018, The Nighthawks are Mark Wenner (vocals and harmonica), Zach Sweeney (lead guitar), Sol Roots (bass guitar), and Mark Stutso (drums).

== History ==
Formed in 1972, the Nighthawks underwent several personnel changes before stabilizing as the lineup of Mark Wenner (vocals and harmonica), Jimmy Thackery (lead guitar), Jan Zukowski (bass guitar), and Pete Ragusa (drums). Their 1979 album, Full House, issued on Adelphi Records, includes guest appearances from Pinetop Perkins and Bob Margolin.

Keyboard player Gregg Wetzel joined the band in 1983, was a full-time member until 1986, and has continued to play at special performances. The membership of the band remained stable until 1986. At that time, tired of the band's extensive touring schedule, Thackery departed to join 'The Assassins' (a part-time "vacation band" he helped found), eventually fronting 'The Drivers' and other groups and to record for Blind Pig Records, and Telarc Records. Following his departure, several players filled the lead guitar spot. These included Jimmy Nalls, Warren Haynes, James Solberg, Danny Morris, Pete Kanaras, with Kanaras becoming the longest lasting member. Also in 1987 and 1988 the band became the Rosebud Agency's East Coast house band, backing tours with Elvin Bishop, John Lee Hooker, John Hammond, and Pinetop Perkins.

In 2003, the band featured in the first episode of the second season of The Wire.

Kanaras and Zukowski departed the band in 2004. They were replaced by Paul Bell (lead guitar) and Johnny Castle (bass guitar). The Nighthawks won the Traditional Blues/R&B Duo/Group Award at the 2009 Washington Area Music Awards. In 2011, their album, Last Train to Bluesville won the Acoustic Album of the Year at the 32nd Blues Music Awards, sponsored by the Blues Foundation.

In 2011, they signed with Severn Records. Then the band released a number of albums on Richmond's EllerSoul label including a Reverend Billy C. Wirtz release.

In 2018 Johnny Castle and Paul Bell left the band to be replaced by Paul Pisciotta on bass and Dan Hovey on guitar. They recorded Tryin To Get To You at Severn Studio in Annapolis, MD with David Earl co-producing and engineering in 2019 and released it on EllerSoul, spring 2020 in time for national lockdown. They are currently back in Severn working on new product including four Dan Hovey originals and two Mark Stutso originals. Tentative title is 49/50 since the band will celebrate its 50th anniversary in 2022.

== Discography ==
Year	Title	Album details
1974	Rock 'n' Roll	Released 1974, 1983, and 1990. Label: Aladdin [Washington DC] ALPS-101, Varrick VR-007 Format: LP/CD
1976	Open All Nite	Released 1976 and 1995, Label: Adelphi AD-4105, Genes GCD-4105 Format: LP/CD
1976	Live at the Psyche Delly	Released 1976 and 1995, Label: Adelphi AD-4110, Genes GCD-4110 Format: LP/CD
1977	Side Pocket Shot	Released 1977 and 1997, Label: Adelphi AD-4115, Genes GCD-4115 Format: LP/CD
1978	Jacks & Kings	Released 1978 Label: Adelphi AD-4120 Format: LP
1980	Jacks & Kings "Full House"	Released 1980 Label: Adelphi AD-4125 Format: LP
1982	Full House – Jacks & Kings Vol. I & II	Released 1982, 1987 and 1994 Label: Genes GCD-4120/25 Format: CD
1980	The Nighthawks	Released 1980 Label: Mercury SRM 1-3833 Format: LP
1982	Times Four	Released 1982 and 1997 Label: Adelphi AD-4130/35, Genes GCD-4130/35 Format: LP/CD
1982	Ten Years Live	Released 1982 and 1983 Label: Chesapeake CRLP-101, Varrick VR-001, CD-001 Format: LP/CD
1984	Hot Spot	Released 1984 Label: Varrick VR-009 Format: LP
1986	Hard Living	Released 1986 Label: Varrick VR-022, CD-022 Format: LP/CD
1988	Backtrack – Live	Released 1988 Label: Varrick VR-036 Format: LP
1987	Live in Europe	Released 1987 and 1992 Label: Crosscut CCR-1014, CCD-11014 Format: LP/CD
1988	Best of the Blues	Released 1988 Label: Adelphi AD-4140 Format: LP
1988	Best of the Rock	Released 1988 Label: Adelphi AD-4145 Format: LP
1990	Best of the Nighthawks	Released 1990 Label: Genes GCD-4140/45 Format: CD
1991	Trouble	Released 1991 and 2001 Label: Powerhouse POW-4107, Ruf 1064 Format: LP/CD
1993	Rock This House	Released 1993 and 2004 Label: Big Mo 1023, Ruf 1097 Format: CD
1996	Pain & Paradise	Released 1996 and 2002 Label: Big Mo 1030, Ruf 1080 Format: CD
1999	Still Wild	Released 1999 Label: Ruf 1037 Format: CD
2002	Live Tonite!	Released 2002 Label: Ruf 1079 Format: CD
2004	Live at the State Theater with Special Guest Hubert Sumlin	Released 2004 Label: Rolling Storm Communications RSC-0505 Format: DVD
2006	Blue Moon in Your Eye (Live at the Barns at Wolf Trap)	Released 2006 Label: Rolling Storm Communications RSC-0601 Format: CD
2009	American Landscape	Released 2009 Label: Powerhouse POW-126 Format: CD
2010	Last Train to Bluesville	Released 2010 Label: Rip Bang RBR-003 Format: CD
2012	Damn Good Time	Released 2010 Label: Severn SEV-0056 Format: CD
2014	444	Released 2014 Label: EllerSoul 1405 Format: CD
2015	Back Porch Party	Released 2015 Label: EllerSoul 1505 Format: CD
2017	All You Gotta Do	Released 2017 Label: EllerSoul 1707 Format: CD
2021	Tryin' to Get to You	Released 2021 Label: EllerSoul 20202 Format: CD
2022	Established 1972	Released 2022 Label: VizzTone VTNH-01 Format: CD

=== Other releases featuring the Nighthawks ===
- Hot Tracks, John Hammond and the Nighthawks (1979, Vanguard) LP/CD
- Bad Boy (Live), Toru Oki and the Nighthawks (1984, CBS/Sony) LP
- Your Name Here, The Nighthawks Minus Mark (2014, Ellersoul) CD
- Full Circle, Rev. Billy C. Wirtz and the Nighthawks (2016, EllerSoul) CD
- "Flying High", Gabe Stillman feat. the Nighthawks (2020) digital release/one song only

=== Mark Wenner solo albums ===
- Fugitive, with "Switchblade" (1984, Whitewall)
- Nothin' But..., with "The Bel Airs" (1989, Powerhouse)
- Runs Good, Needs Paint (2000, Right On Rhythm)
- Mama Tried, with "The Bel Airs" (2002, Right On Rhythm)
- Mark Wenner's Blues Warriors (2018, EllerSoul)

== See also ==
- WHFS
