= Ronnie Earl =

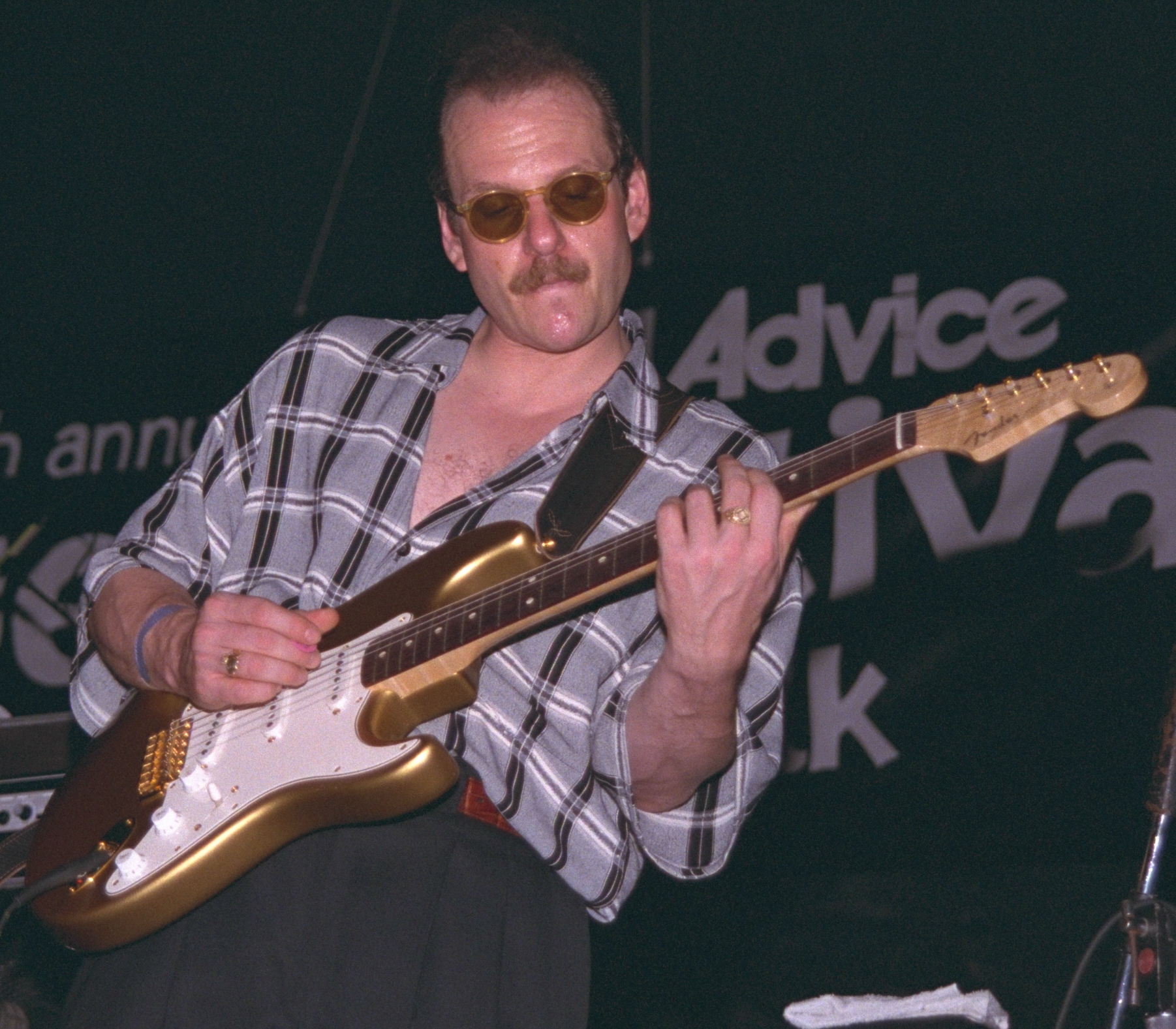
- Earl playing the 1996 Riverwalk Blues Festival

Background information
- Born: Ronald Horvath; March 10, 1953 (age 73); Queens, New York, U.S.
- Genres: Blues, rhythm and blues, jazz
- Occupation: Musician
- Instrument: Guitar
- Years active: 1979–present
- Labels: Black Top, Telarc, Rounder, Stony Plain, Verve, Sledgehammer Blues/AudioQuest Music, Antone's
- Website: www.ronnieearl.com

Ronnie Earl (born Ronald Horvath, March 10, 1953, Queens, New York, United States) is an American blues guitarist and music instructor.

Earl who grew up collecting various music records, pursued a degree in special education and education at Boston University. He became interested in guitar after attending a Muddy Waters concert and began playing in the Boston blues scene. He later joined the band Roomful of Blues and started a solo career in 1986. In 1984, Earl formed his band, The Broadcasters, which released multiple albums over the years. Diagnosed with medical ailments in 2000, he scaled back on touring and later reformed the Broadcasters with a new lineup. As a four-time Blues Music Award winner for Guitar Player of the Year, Earl has also been an associate professor of guitar at Berklee College of Music and released an instructional video. His band, Ronnie Earl and the Broadcasters, celebrated their 30th anniversary in 2018 and released their 26th studio album, Mercy Me, in 2022.

== Career ==
Earl collected blues, jazz, rock and soul records while growing up. He studied American History at C.W. Post College on Long Island for a year and a half, then moved to Boston to pursue a Bachelor's Degree in Special Education and Education at Boston University where he would graduate in 1975. He spent a short time teaching handicapped children. During his college years, he attended a Muddy Waters concert at the Jazz Workshop in Boston. After seeing Waters perform, Earl took a serious interest in the guitar, which he had first picked up in 1973. His first job was as a rhythm guitarist at The Speakeasy, a blues club in Cambridge, Massachusetts. In addition to playing in the Boston blues scene, Earl traveled twice by Greyhound Bus to Chicago, where he was introduced to the Chicago blues scene by Koko Taylor.

Later he traveled to New Orleans and Austin, Texas, where he spent time with Kim Wilson, Jimmie Vaughan and The Fabulous Thunderbirds. In 1979, he joined the band Roomful of Blues as lead guitarist.

He began performing solo in 1986, in addition to playing with Roomful of Blues, and he released his first solo album on the Black Top Records label with a quartet that focused on blues instrumentals. After leaving Roomful of Blues, he began collaborations with contemporaries Ron Levy, Jerry Portnoy, Earl King, Jimmy Rogers, and Jimmy Witherspoon.

In 1984, Earl formed his own band which he called 'The Broadcasters'. The band was named after one of the first Fender guitars, distributed in 1950, which originally had been labeled The Broadcaster. The first group of Broadcasters included Darrell Nulisch (vocalist), Jerry Portnoy (harmonica), Steve Gomes (bass), and Per Hanson (drums). In 1988 they released their first album, Soul Searchin, followed by Peace of Mind in 1990. Their album Language of the Soul was released in 1994. The lineup for the Broadcasters for that album was Bruce Katz (keyboards), Per Hanson (drums) and "Rocket" Rod Carey (bass). The next album The Colour of Love, featured Marc Quinones (percussion) and Gregg Allman (keyboards). The latter association led to Ronnie Earl and the Broadcasters' opening for the Allman Brothers Band at Great Woods, and to Warren Haynes (guitarist for the Allman Brothers Band) sitting in with Ronnie Earl and the Broadcasters at Johnnie D's in Somerville. Later, Katz joined the Gregg Allman Band.

In 2000, Earl was diagnosed with several medical ailments, and scaled back his touring, and also re-evaluated his career plans. In 2002, Earl gathered together a new group of Broadcasters and began a productive and creative partnership with Stony Plain Records of Edmonton, Alberta, Canada. The new Broadcasters were Jim Mouradian (bass), Dave Limina (piano, Hammond B3), and Lorne Entress (drums). In 2014, Diane Blue (vocals) joined the band as a full time Broadcaster and became the first female Broadcaster. In August 2016, Lorne Entress left to work on other projects and, in January 2017, Jim Mouradian died suddenly after a show. The current group of Broadcasters (2018) now include Dave Limina (piano, Hammond B3), Diane Blue (vocals), Forrest Padgett (drums), and Paul Kochanski (bass).

In 2017, Ronnie Earl and the Broadcasters released The Luckiest Man, his eleventh release from Stony Plain Records. In October 2018, Ronnie Earl and the Broadcasters celebrated thirty years as a band.

Earl is a four-time (1997, 1999, 2014, 2018) Blues Music Award winner as Guitar Player of the Year. For five years he was an associate professor of guitar at Berklee College of Music and, in 1995, he released Ronnie Earl: Blues Guitar with Soul, an instructional VHS tape for Arlen Roth's Hot Licks Video that was then re-released in DVD format in 2005. Earl was also the blues instructor at the 'National Guitar Summer Workshop'.

In early 2004, Earl's "Hey Jose" was named Best Blues/R&B Song at the third annual Independent Music Awards.

Earl frequently plays both scheduled and impromptu sessions at the Bull Run Tavern in Shirley, Massachusetts, either on the main stage in the ballroom, or sitting in with visiting bands and performers in the tap room. He plays an annual birthday show at the Bull Run every March.

In February 2022, Ronnie Earl and the Broadcasters released the album, Mercy Me. It is their 26th studio album, and 14th with Sony Plain Records.

== Discography ==
=== Ronnie Earl and the Broadcasters ===
==== Studio albums ====
- 1983 Smokin'
- 1984 They Call Me Mr. Earl
- 1986 I Like It When It Rains
- 1988 Soul Searching
- 1990 Peace of Mind
- 1991 Surrounded by Love
- 1993 Still River
- 1994 Language of the Soul
- 1995 Grateful Heart: Blues and Ballads
- 1996 Eye to Eye -with Pinetop Perkins
- 1997 The Colour of Love
- 2000 Healing Time
- 2001 Ronnie Earl and Friends
- 2003 I Feel Like Goin' On
- 2004 Now My Soul
- 2005 The Duke Meets the Earl -with Duke Robillard
- 2007 Hope Radio
- 2009 Living in the Light
- 2010 Spread the Love
- 2014 Good News
- 2015 Father's Day
- 2016 Maxwell Street
- 2017 The Luckiest Man
- 2019 Beyond The Blue Door
- 2020 Rise Up
- 2022 Mercy Me

==== Live albums ====
- 1995 Blues Guitar Virtuoso – Live in Europe (note: Blues and Forgiveness is the same album)
- 2013 Just for Today

==== Compilations ====
- 1985 Deep Blues
- 1992 Test of Time: A Retrospective
- 1997 Plays Big Blues
- 2006 Heart and Soul: The Best of Ronnie Earl

==== Guest appearances ====
Ronnie Earl has appeared as a guest on over 40 albums and projects.

With Jimmy Rogers

- Jimmy Rogers with Ronnie Earl and the Broadcasters (Bullseye, 1994)

With Big Joe Turner

- Blues Train (Muse, 1983) -with special guest: Dr. John

With Eddie "Cleanhead" Vinson

- Eddie "Cleanhead" Vinson & Roomful of Blues (Muse, 1982)

== DVDs ==
- 2001 Blues Guitar with Soul
- 2008 Hope Radio Sessions

== See also ==
- List of blues musicians
- San Francisco Blues Festival
- Long Beach Blues Festival
