= Edmonton Blues Festival =

Coordinates: 53.527°N 113.547°W

- Genre: Blues
- Locations: Edmonton, Alberta, Canada
- Years active: 1999–2024
- Website: Edmonton Blues Festival Official website

The Edmonton Blues Festival (formerly Edmonton's Labatt Blues Festival) is an annual blues music festival in Edmonton, Alberta, Canada, which was first held in 1999. The festival runs for three days (a Friday, Saturday, and Sunday) in mid-August at the Heritage Amphitheatre in Hawrelak Park. In 2008, the festival was the recipient of the 'Keeping The Blues Alive Award' from the Blues Foundation, based in Memphis, Tennessee. Due to renovations that will closed Hawrelak Park until 2026, the festival moved to Edmonton's RE/MAX Field for the 2023 edition.

The festival was last held in 2024. In 2026, it was announced that the festival was permanently cancelled.

== List of performers ==
=== Friday 25 August ===
- Rockin' Highliners
- Rosie Ledet "The Zydeco Sweetheart"
- Lone Star Shootout ft. Lonnie Brooks, Phillip Walker & Long John Hunter

=== Saturday 26 August ===
- Hot Cottage with "The Craft Horns"
- Bryan Lee "The Braille Blues Daddy"
- Debbie Davies
- James Harman
- The Fabulous Thunderbirds

=== Sunday 27 August ===
- Big Dave McLean and the Tim Williams Electric Band
- Maurice John Vaughn
- Walter "Wolfman" Washington & The Roadmasters
- Shemekia Copeland
- Anson Fungerburgh & The Rockets ft. Sam Myers

=== Friday 24 August ===
- Rosie Ledet the Zydeco Sweetheart
- Paul deLay Band
- Luther "Guitar Junior" Johnson

=== Saturday 25 August ===
- Bad News Blues Band
- Paul Osher "Alone with the Blues"
- Janiva Magness
- Rod Piazza and the Mighty Flyers
- The Rolling Fork Blues Review ft. Nappy Brown, Pinetop Perkins, Hubert Sumlin, Rusty Zinn

=== Sunday 26 August ===
- Brent Parkin Band with Rusty Reed
- Paul Rishell & Annie Raines
- Norton Buffalo and the Knockouts
- Sleepy LaBeef
- Dr. John

=== Friday 23 August ===
- Jack Semple Band
- Roy Rogers & the Delta Rhythm Kings
- Charlie Musselwhite

=== Saturday 24 August ===
- Cephas & Wiggins
- Terry Hanck
- Big Jack Johnson & the Oilers
- C. J. Chenier & the Red Hot Louisiana Band
- Marcia Ball

=== Sunday 25 August ===
- Rory Block
- The Twisters
- Kelley Hunt
- Sonny Rhodes
- Ike Turner & the Kings of Rhythm

=== Friday 22 August ===
- Sue Foley
- Junior Watson
- Mark Hummel's Blues Harp Blowout ft. James Harman and Snooky Pryor

=== Saturday 23 August ===
- Tom Rigney and Flambeau
- Big Time Sarah
- Dave Hole
- Magic Slim and the Teardrops
- Duke Robillard Band with a special appearance by Ruth Brown

=== Sunday 24 August ===
- Ann Rabson
- Paul Reddick and the Sidemen
- Ponty Bone and the Squeezetones
- Omar and the Howlers
- The John Hammond Band

=== Friday 20 August ===
- Morgan Davis
- Chubby Carrier & The Bayou Swamp Band
- James Cotton

=== Saturday 21 August ===
- Donald Ray Johnson
- Lil' Ed Williams and the Blues Imperials
- Sugar Ray Norcia and the Bluetones
- Angela Strehli
- Roomful of Blues

=== Sunday 22 August ===
- Steve James
- Gary Primich
- Kenny "Blues Boss" Wayne
- Sista Monica Parker
- Jimmie Vaughan

=== Friday 19 August ===
- Curley Bridges
- W. C. Clark
- Koko Taylor and her Blues Machine

=== Saturday 20 August ===
- Mike Kindred
- David Gogo
- Mem Shannon and the Membership
- Downchild Blues Band
- The Mannish Boys featuring Finis Tasby, Kid Ramos, and Johnny Dyer

=== Sunday 21 August ===
- Mary Flower
- Craig Horton
- Zac Harmon and the Mid-South Blues Revue
- Bob Margolin with Willie "Big Eyes" Smith and Rev. Billy C. Wirtz
- Delbert McClinton

=== Friday 25 August ===
- Kenny Neal and Billy Branch
- Phillip Walker with the Texas Horns
- Mark Hummel with Billy Boy Arnold and Lee Oskar

=== Saturday 26 August ===
- Eden Brent
- James Hinkle with the Texas Horns
- Jimmy Thackery
- Reba Russell
- Terrence Simien
- The Hollywood Blue Flames

=== Sunday 27 August ===
- Fruteland Jackson
- Pete Turland Band with Paul Pugat
- Diunna Greenleaf and Blue Mercy with the Texas Horns
- Henry Gray and the Cats featuring Paul "Lil' Buck" Sinegal
- The Chicago Blues Reunion with Paul Butterfield, Michael Bloomfield, Nick Gravenites, Tracy Nelson, Harvey Mandel, Barry Goldberg, Corky Siegel, and Sam Lay.

== See also ==
- List of Canadian blues festivals and venues
- List of festivals in Edmonton
- List of festivals in Alberta
- List of music festivals in Canada
