= Julian Fauth =

- Born: Germany
- Origin: Kitchener, Ontario, Canada
- Genres: Blues, pop rock
- Occupation(s): Pianist, singer and songwriter
- Instrument(s): Piano, vocals
- Years active: 1990s–present
- Labels: Electro-Fi Records
- Website: julianfauth.com/official-bio

Julian Fauth is a Canadian blues pianist, singer and songwriter. He has collaborated on record with Harmonica Shah, Curley Bridges, Fruteland Jackson, Finis Tasby, and David Rotundo. Fauth has recorded four solo albums for Electro-Fi Records; his first was nominated for, and his second won, a Juno Award. His third, Everybody Ought to Treat a Stranger Right, was selected as the 'Best Blues Album of 2012' by the Canadian Broadcasting Corporation. He has also received a Maple Blues Award and was nominated for several others. Fauth has opened for Johnny Winter, John Mayall and John Hammond.

Toronto Star stated that "he's been compared to Tom Waits and Bob Dylan, but blues singer-songwriter Julian Fauth is a true original".

Fauth was influenced by fellow piano players including Memphis Slim, Roosevelt Sykes, Leroy Carr, and Sunnyland Slim.

== Life and career ==
Julian Fauth was born in Germany, and spent his early years in Kitchener, Ontario. Fauth's father was a radio journalist and when Julian was six years old, his father brought home some surplus albums for the local radio station. One of these was a compilation album, The Golden Blues Hour, which included tracks by Mississippi John Hurt and Buddy Guy. The young Fauth was further inspired hearing radio programmes including work by Leroy Carr, Scrapper Blackwell and Bumble Bee Slim. Having been left a piano after the death of one of his aunts, Fauth attempted to play the instrument in the style of Memphis Slim. In his teenage years, Fauth became a protege of Mel Brown. Fauth's later time at university saw him gain a Master of Arts in philosophy.

In 1996, Fauth relocated to Toronto and began playing in the bars around Kensington Market, where he befriended David Rotundo. Fauth developed his own style based on pre-war barrelhouse boogie-woogie, tinged with elements of jazz and gospel. He expanded his range playing across the United States, as well as in Russia and Cuba. Fauth also worked with locally based musicians such as David Rotundo, Paul Reddick, and Michael Pickett. Fauth began to write his own songs and to reinterpret more traditional material. Along with Ken Yoshioka (harmonica) and Mike Robertson (steel guitar), Fauth formed the trio Dark Holler, named after a Clarence Ashley tune. They released the album Mother Earth (1998). In 2000, Fauth met Bob Mover and played alongside him for a while, before touring in Russia with Rotundo two years later.

His debut album, Songs of Vice and Sorrow, was released by Electro-Fi Records in 2005, the cover of which depicted a dishevelled image of Buster Keaton. AllMusic described the album as "a unique, idiosyncratic, and often fascinating statement". It was nominated for both Juno and Maple Blues Awards. His follow-up was Ramblin' Son (2008), which saw original material interspersed with a cover version of Sister Rosetta Tharpe's "Can't No Grave Hold My Body Down", and rearrangements of Fats Waller's "Hopeless Love Affair", Guitar Slim's "Done Got Over That" and the Carter Family's "Can the Circle Be Unbroken (By and By)". Reddick and Rotundo both supplied harmonica parts to several tracks. Ramblin' Son won a Juno Award in 2009 for Blues Album of the Year. Prior to this, Fauth played the piano on Harmonica Shah's 2006 album, Listen at Me Good, as part of a guest list that included Mel Brown and Willie "Big Eyes" Smith.

In 2010, Julian Fauth: The Blues Is Just A Feeling was released. It was a black and white documentary film, incorporating concert footage both of Fauth at the Winterfolk Festival in Toronto, and the International Blues Challenge in Memphis, Tennessee, along with interviews. The same year Fauth was part of the various artists ensemble that recorded Electro-Fi Records Presents Blues Piano-Rama. Another Electro-Fi Records release, the issue contained tracks by Bobby Dean Blackburn, Curley Bridges, Kenny "Blues Boss" Wayne, and Fauth. Fauth was voted the 'Piano/Keyboard Player of the Year' at the 14th Annual Maple Blues Awards.

Everybody Ought to Treat a Stranger Right (2012) was Fauth's third solo album, this time containing all his own song writing work. It was named as the 'Best Blues Album of 2012' by the CBC.

In January 2015, Fauth performed at the Bassment in Saskatoon as part of their 'Blues Series'. In June that year, Fauth again supplied guest piano work, along with Jack de Keyzer's guitar, to Harmonica Shah, this time for the latter's album, If You Live to Get Old, You Will Understand.

== Discography ==
=== Albums ===
Year	Title	Record label
2005	Songs of Vice and Sorrow	Electro-Fi Records
2008	Ramblin' Son	Electro-Fi Records
2010	Electro-Fi Records Presents Blues Piano-Rama (various artists)	Electro-Fi Records
2012	Everybody Ought to Treat a Stranger Right	Electro-Fi Records
2017	The Weak and the Wicked the Hard and the Strong	Electro-Fi Records

== See also ==
- Canadian blues
- List of blues musicians
