= I Won (disambiguation) =

"I Won" is a 2014 song by Future.

I Won may also refer to:

- "I Won", a song by the Sundays from the 1990 album Reading, Writing and Arithmetic
- "I Won", a song by Camille Bloom from the 2006 album Say Goodbye to Pretty
- "I Won", a song by Fruteland Jackson from the 2007 album Tell Me What You Say
