= Electro-Fi Records =

Record label based in Toronto, Ontario, Canada

Electro-Fi Records is a Canadian award-winning independent record label founded in 1996, based in Toronto, Ontario, Canada, which specializes in the release of blues records.

== History ==
Electro-Fi Records was founded in 1996 by Andrew Galloway, with assistance from Gary Collver and Alec Fraser. Galloway started the label shortly before turning forty, following a career in corporate communications. Collver's background was in photography and media. Fraser, a bassist and vocalist, was a professional musician and record producer.

Since its formation, the label has released over fifty albums of original blues material. It has specialized in releases which pair experienced American blues musicians, such as Willie "Big Eyes" Smith and Curley Bridges, with Canadian musicians. The 2009 Electro-Fi release of Ramblin' Son, by Julian Fauth, won the Juno Award for Blues Album of the Year, as did the 2004 Electro-Fi release of Painkiller, by Morgan Davis. Galloway and Fraser co-produced Ramblin' Son with Fauth, with the album also mixed and co-engineered by Fraser. In addition, Fraser, who co-produced the Painkiller album with Davis, won the 2004 Maple Blues Award for Producer of the Year. An earlier release by Electro-Fi, Blues Weather, by Fathead, won the 1999 Juno Award for Blues Album of the Year. A 2001 Electro-Fi release by Mel Brown and The Homewreckers, Neck Bones & Caviar, being Brown's debut record on the label, won the W.C. Handy Award for Comeback Album of the Year. The album was co-produced by Galloway and mixed by Fraser.

== Artists recording for Electro-Fi ==
- Billy Boy Arnold
- Blackburn
- Bobby Dean Blackburn
- Diana Braithwaite
- Curley Bridges
- Mel Brown
- Enrico Crivellaro
- Morgan Davis
- Fathead
- Fruteland Jackson
- Harmonica Shah
- Julian Fauth
- James Harman
- Mark Hummel
- Andrew "Jr. Boy" Jones
- Harrison Kennedy
- Johnny Laws
- John Mays
- Miss Angel
- Sam Myers
- Paul Oscher
- Gary Primich
- Rip Lee Pryor
- Snooky Pryor
- Shakura S'Aida
- Little Mack Simmons
- George "Harmonica" Smith
- Willie "Big Eyes" Smith
- Finis Tasby
- Lil' Dave Thompson
- Kenny "Blues Boss" Wayne
- Chris Whiteley
- Sharrie Williams
