= Topanga Canyon Blues Festival =

Annual blues festival in California, US

- Genre: Blues
- Locations: Will Geer Theatricum Botanicum, Topanga Canyon, California
- Years active: 1982–2019, 2021–
- Website: scbsevents.org

The Topanga Canyon Blues Festival is an annual event held in California, attracting blues acts from across the United States. It began in 1982. Like the Orange County Blues Festival, it attracts some of the major blues artists in the United States. Over the years the festival has been running, it has seen major blues acts such as Etta James, Willie Dixon, Otis Rush, Big Joe Turner, Lowell Fulson, Junior Wells, Pee Wee Crayton, Phil Gates and Jimmy "Preacher" Ellis. Other acts such as Paul Butterfield, William Clarke, Linda Hopkins, Philip Sayce and Roy Gaines have appeared there.

The COVID-19 pandemic caused the 2020 event to be cancelled and deferred to 2021.

== Background ==
The festival is held in the Will Geer Theatricum Botanicum, an outdoor theater in the Topanga Canyon. It is a day-long event of blues and roots music. In addition to music there is a harmonica workshop and family events. The festival draws people from areas such as Malibu, Southern California, Santa Monica, Topanga Canyon, San Fernando Valley and beach areas. Zack Slovinsky has been the most recent organizer for the festival and has brought in blues acts such as Phillip Walker. He has also brought in other acts that may not be immediately identifiable as blues.

The festival was sponsored by the Southern California Blues Society. The Southern California Blues Society was a non-profit organization. The organization had the aim of preserving, promoting and keeping American Blues music and its culture alive. In the past the proceeds of the festival went to the Willie Dixon Scholarship Fund, Blues in the Schools and also free concerts promoting blues music.

=== Acts ===
1990s

In 1991, the acts scheduled to appear at the festival were Floyd Dixon, Billy Vera, Joe Houston, Lowell Fulson, Jim Beasley and Mickey Champion. The Delgado Brothers appeared at the festival in 1999.

2000s

The theme for the festival in 2005, which was put together by Deborah Dixon, was to honor musicians who had lived in Los Angeles, or those who had greatly contributed to the blues heritage of Los Angeles. Aunt Kizzy's Boyz, Lady Star and the Bustin' Loose Blues Band and the LA Legends Revue, an ensemble that featured Melvyn "Deacon" Jones, Finis Tasby, Hollis Gilmore, Johnny Dyer, Big Jay McNeely, Melvin Eddy and Miss Mickey Champion appeared for its 23rd year celebration. The headliner for the festival in 2009 was blues guitarist Phillip Walker. The following year, Walker died. In 2011, Chick Willis, Gregg Wright, and Sean Lane appeared at the festival. They were the headline acts for the festival's 28th annual event. Another act to appear at the festival that year was the Lynwood Slim Blues Band. In 2012, some of the acts that appeared at the festival were Chicago's Jimmy Johnson, Barbara Morrison & The Joe Kincaid Band, Chris James and Patrick Rynn, and Lightnin' Willie & the Poorboys. In 2013, the headliner was Eddy Clearwater.

== Recent activity ==
The date of May 2, 2015 marked the festival's 32nd year. One of the artists to appear in 2015 was Philip Sayce.

With 2020 cancelled caused by the pandemic, the event was deferred to 2021.
