= Lightnin' Willie & the Poorboys =

American blues band

- Origin: United States
- Genres: Blues
- Years active: 1990s–present
- Labels: 145 Records
- Website: Official website

Lightnin' Willie & the Poorboys is an American blues band. They have released eight albums, with their self-titled debut being issued in 1994. The band have opened for musicians including John Mayall, Junior Wells, Robben Ford, and the Chicago Blues All-Stars, plus most recently Robert Cray. They have performed at many venues including the Royal Albert Hall, the Brecon Jazz Festival, and Willie Nelson's Fourth of July Picnic.

Jonny Whiteside, writing in the Los Angeles Times in 2014, stated that the "Los Angeles based bluesman Lightnin’ Willie has developed a particularly intriguing wrinkle on the genre, one that's cool, airy, with a sinuous groove that infiltrates his audiences’ consciousness and invariably gets them on their feet. He has no quarrel mixing dancing with the blues".

Their most recent album, No Black No White Just Blues, was released in 2017.

== Career ==
The band's frontman was born Willie Hermes in Texas, United States. In his early twenties, Hermes performed on the Southern Chitlin' Circuit, as the sole white member in a rhythm and blues/funk-based band. His guitar playing was inspired by T-Bone Walker, Albert King, and B.B. King, plus Muddy Waters, whom Hermes saw perform on numerous occasions and was introduced to. He formed his backing outfit, the Poorboys, in the early 1990s, and has continued to tour, perform and record to the present day.

Their debut album was released by 145 Records in 1994. The follow-up, American Made, was not issued until 1998, by which time a change in backing personnel had occurred. The album also featured guest appearances by the Irish harmonica player, Hurricane Jake Fitzgerald, plus Mississippi Slim, Billy Watts, and Edward Tree. The new Poorboys included Pete Anderson, Skip Edwards, and Taras Prodaniuk. Tree produced the collection and Willie wrote all but one of the 12 tracks.

Further albums were issued including Buy American (2000), Lucky as the Devil (2001) and the live album, Got it Live If You Want It! (2004). The albums were supported by touring, including appearances at festivals such as the Edinburgh Blues Festival, Stanley Blues Festival, Maryport Blues Festival, Brecon Jazz Festival, Zottergem Blues Festival (Belgium), Bardies Festival (France), Portland's Riverfront Blues Festival, and the Gray Sky Blues Festival (2016). Photographs were taken of Lightnin' Willie performing with the Poorboys at the Brecon Jazz Festival, in Powys, Wales. In addition, the band played in the "Ignite Series" at the Royal Albert Hall in London, and at Willie Nelson's Fourth of July Picnic in Fort Worth, Texas in 2005, where they appeared alongside Willie Nelson, Bob Dylan, The Doobie Brothers, and Leon Russell.

By this time, Lightnin' Willie had become an accomplished and hard-working guitarist, vocalist and songwriter, and was based in Los Angeles, California. Lightnin' Willie's original music has been included in soundtracks for television series/programs such as Whatever It Takes, 1-800-Missing, The L Word, and Mysterious Ways; and for film soundtracks including Route 666 (2001) and The Final Cut (2004).

Their next recording, 2008's Roadworks Tour was recorded at the end of their tour in Europe in that year, which finished in Nottingham, England. The band was also an International Blues Challenge finalist. At the Topanga Canyon Blues Festival in 2012, some of the acts that appeared at the festival were Jimmy Johnson, Chris James and Patrick Rynn, and Lightnin' Willie & the Poorboys. By now the Poorboys were self-billed as "the Biggest Little Band on Earth", and consisted of Lightnin’ Willie on guitar and vocals, plus Michael Murphy on keyboards, Skip Edwards on keyboards and accordion, Jesper Kristensen or Jerry Olsen on drums, with Ron Dzubla playing saxophone.

Pete Anderson produced their latest album No Black No White Just Blues (2017). One critic noted that the album contained the track, "Note On My Door", which "has a late-night Chicago club tone, probably influenced from his time hanging out with Muddy Waters some years ago".

Lightnin' Willie & the Poorboys toured in 2017 as support to Robert Cray, and appeared at the Saban Theatre in Beverly Hills, California on November 10 that year.

== Discography ==
Year	Title	Record label
1994	Lightnin' Willie and the Poorboys	145 Records
1998	American Made	145 Records
2000	Buy American	145 Records
2001	Lucky as the Devil	Bluetrack Records
2004	Got it Live If You Want It!	145 Records
2008	Roadworks Tour	145 Records
2008	Tracks	145 Records
2017	No Black No White Just Blues	Little Dog Records

== See also ==
- Willy and the Poor Boys, 1969 Creedence Clearwater Revival album.
