= Tasby =

Tasby is a surname. Notable people with the surname include:

- Finis Tasby (1939–2014), American blues singer
- Willie Tasby (1933–2022), American baseball player
