= Crivellaro =

Crivellaro is a surname. Notable people with the surname include:

- Enrico Crivellaro, Italian blues musician
- Lucas Piton Crivellaro (born 2000), Brazilian footballer
- Rafael Crivellaro (born 1989), Brazilian footballer
