= Orange County Blues Festival =

Former blues festival in Dana Point, California

Coordinates: 33°27′47″N 117°41′50″W

The Orange County Blues Festival was an annual multi-day blues event held in Dana Point, California, United States. Similar to the nearby Topanga Canyon Blues Festival held in Topanga Canyon, it attracted major blues artists from the U.S. including Canned Heat, based in Los Angeles; Johnny Copeland from Houston, and Etta James. The Orange County Blues Festival has been replaced by the Doheny Blues Festival, a newer event which takes place at another location in Dana Point.

== History ==
The Orange County Blues Festival was located at Heritage Park in Dana Point. The festival was created after a discussion between John Vincent, the organizer of the Portland Blues Festival in Portland, Oregon, and Jim Oakes from Dana Point. With outside festivals being increasingly popular, they wanted to start one in Orange County.

The festival was largely modeled after the Portland Blues Festival because of Vincent's connections to the latter event. In addition to the main stage for headliners, another stage was set up for school bands to perform. There was a fine arts fair with 35 to 50 stall booths. Some of the proceeds of the festival were to benefit a youth recovery program and Eric Jensen was the promoter for the 1993 festival.

=== Controversy ===
In 1994, the organizers of the festival were involved in a legal dispute regarding who held the naming rights to the event. Oakes claimed that he was the owner of the festival name. In addition, former partners John Christian and John Dew wanted to organize a competing blues festival.

The festival was to be held in September 1994 but was halted by a conflicting event. Oakes applied for a permit for the festival at Heritage Park from September 24-25, but it was discovered by city officials that a wedding was also scheduled for the 24th in the park. They told Oakes that the wedding had first priority. Further complicating things, another festival also named the Orange County Blues Festival was for October 1 at Doheny State Beach which is also in Dana Point. The organizers of the Doheny State Beach festival were Oakes' former partners (Christian and Dew).

== Past lineups ==
1993

- Sept 24: Rod Piazza & the Mighty Flyers, Al Blake, Lynwood Slim featuring Kid Ramos
- Sept 25: Johnny Copeland, Canned Heat, Al Rapone & the Zydeco Express, Guitar Shorty, Latele Barton and the Taildraggers, King Ernest (King Ernest Baker), Smokey Wilson
- Sept 26: Earl Thomas, Beau Jocque & the Zydeco High-Rollers, Robert Lucas, Juke Logan, Brenda Burns

1994

- Canceled

1995

- Junior Wells, Rod Piazza & The Mighty Flyers, Wilson Pickett, Jeff Healey Band, Luther Allison
