= Mark Hummel =

American vocalist and songwriter (born 1955)

- Mark Hummel live at the Silver Dollar, Toronto, 2003

Background information
- Born: December 15, 1955 (age 70); New Haven, Connecticut, United States
- Genre: Blues
- Instruments: Harmonica, vocals, guitar
- Years active: 1977–present
- Labels: Flying Fish, Mountain Top Productions, Blind Pig, Tone-Cool, Electro-Fi
- Website: http://www.markhummel.com

Mark Hummel (born December 15, 1955) is an American blues harmonica player, vocalist, songwriter, and long-time bandleader of the Blues Survivors. Since 1991, Hummel has produced the Blues Harmonica Blowout tour, of which he is also a featured performer. The shows have featured blues harmonica players such as James Cotton, Carey Bell, John Mayall and Charlie Musselwhite. Although he is typically identified as performing West Coast blues, Hummel is also proficient in Delta blues, Chicago blues, swing and jazz styles. Hummel also played with the Golden State Lone Star Revue (a Texas/California supergroup), a rock blues side group the FlashBacks, as well as the current edition of the Blues Survivors. Since 2021, Hummel and documentary film maker Jeff Vargen have collaborated on a video podcast, 'Mark Hummel's Harmonica Party' with both interviews and live performances of 50 blues and rock musicians including Charlie Musselwhite, Elvin Bishop, Barbara Dane, Nick Gravenites, Duke Robillard, Country Joe MacDonald, Barry Goldberg, Magic Dick, Lee Oskar, Willie Chambers, Anson Funderburgh, Angela Strehli, Chris Cain and others.

== Biography ==
=== Childhood ===
Mark Hummel was born in New Haven, Connecticut, United States, and grew up in Los Angeles, California. Hummel and his family lived for a time in Aliso Village, a housing project in East Los Angeles that was demolished in 1999. As Hummel explains in his forthcoming autobiography, his parents hired Mexican babysitters who often played R&B and soul music on the radio when they cared for him. It was through these babysitters that Hummel was first introduced to black music. Early on, he was also drawn to the music of Jimmy Reed and Slim Harpo. Hummel did not start playing harmonica seriously until high school, and by the age of sixteen he was already playing in bands.

=== Career ===
Hummel began working professionally after moving to the San Francisco Bay Area in the early 1970s. A number of jazz and blues artists had already made their mark on Hummel at this point in his early career, including Billie Holiday, Count Basie, Ella Johnson, Lester Young, Jimmy Reed, Little Walter, Muddy Waters, Big Walter Horton, Paul Butterfield, Sonny Boy Williamson II, and Charlie Musselwhite.

Once established in the East Bay in the 1970s, Hummel started performing with Boogie Jake, Sonny Lane, Cool Papa Sadler, and Mississippi Johnny Waters. He formed the Blues Survivors in 1979, and they have been his band ever since. Since its inception the band has featured a number of popular performers before they became household names, such as King of the Hill creator and blues bassist Mike Judge. Other noteworthy members include Jimmy Bott, June Core, Marty Dodson, Rusty Zinn, Ronnie James Weber, Chris Masterson, Charles Wheal, Steve Wolf, Randy Bermudes and Joel Foy. Over the years Hummel has also toured or recorded with Sue Foley, Charles Brown, Brownie McGhee, Willie "Big Eyes" Smith, Bob Stroger, Dave Myers, Jimmy Pugh, Kid Andersen, Ron Thompson, Junior Watson, Duke Robillard, Steve Freund, Billy Flynn and Frank "Paris Slim" Goldwasser. Hummel has also toured with Lowell Fulson, Jimmy Rogers, Luther Tucker and Eddie Taylor; live recordings from those tours are available on his CD compilation Chicago Blues Party: Recorded Live! 1980–1992. In addition to playing in blues clubs across the U.S. and throughout Europe, Hummel and the Blues Survivors have performed at the San Francisco Blues Festival, the Sonora Blues Festival, the Chicago Blues Festival, the King Biscuit Blues Festival, and the Monterey Jazz Festival. He has also contributed CD reviews to Blues Music Magazine and Living Blues. Writing in Living Blues, Lee Hildebrand described Hummel's performance at the 1978 San Francisco Blues Festival as one that "epitomized the high musical quality of the entire weekend" festival.

Jerry Portnoy, a blues harmonica player who used to play in Muddy Waters' band, described Hummel as a musician who possesses "tremendous chops and great knowledge, not only of traditional blues harmonica but other music as well - R&B and swing and big-band jazz. He brings a lot to the table when he plays." He appeared on the cover of the August/September 2005 issue of Blues Revue magazine, and in April 2010, Hummel was a guest on the House of Blues Radio Hour, a syndicated weekly radio program hosted by Dan Aykroyd (in character as Elwood Blues).

Hummel is also known for founding the Blues Harmonica Blowout tours, which he has produced regularly since 1991. The tour features a rotating lineup of veteran harmonica players backed by the Blues Survivors. Past tours have included Snooky Pryor, William Clarke, Billy Boy Arnold, Lazy Lester, Sam Myers, John Mayall, John P. Hammond, Elvin Bishop, Jason Ricci, Howard Levy, Corky Siegel, James Cotton, Charlie Musselwhite, Duke Robillard, Kim Wilson, Lee Oskar, Jerry Portnoy, Magic Dick, Rod Piazza, Paul deLay, James Harman, Mitch Kashmar, John Primer, Huey Lewis, Bobby Rush and many others.

Hummel wrote a book about his musical travels for Mountain Top Publishing called Big Road Blues: 12 Bars On I-80 in 2012.

Hummel currently endorses Sonny Jr. harmonica amplifiers, Seydel harmonicas, and Fat Bottom microphones. He is a contributor to David Barrett's BluesHarmonica.com.

As of 2012, Hummel toured with a California and Texas aggregation, 'Golden State Lone Star Revue', a group that featured Anson Funderburgh and Little Charlie Baty on guitars plus R.W. Grigsby on bass, and Wes Starr on drums. Baty left the group in December 2016 and has been replaced by the guitarist Mike Keller in January 2017.

In 2019, Hummel was nominated for a Blues Music Award in the 'Best Instrumentalist: Harmonica' category. This is his seventh nomination.

In 2014, Blind Pig's Remembering Little Walter album, that Hummel produced and performed on, was nominated for Best Blues CD at the Grammy Awards. It also won two Blues Music Awards for Best Blues CD and Best Traditional Blues CD. In April 2014, Electro-Fi Records released Hummel's The Hustle Is Really On. It featured the 'Golden State Lone Star Revue' as well as Kid Andersen, Sid Morris, Doug James, and June Core. The CD made the Living Blues Radio Charts for four months reaching number two. It was also nominated for Best Traditional Blues CD in 2015.

In 2016, Hummel and the Golden State Lone Star Revue released their debut album on Electro-Fi Records.

Hummel's latest album (2020) is a tribute to Bluebird/RCA Victor blues musicians of the 1930s and 1940s. Entitled Wayback Machine it featured Joe Beard, Billy Flynn, Kid Andersen, Rusty Zinn, R.W. Grigsby and Deep Basement Shakers. This is Hummel's 29th release and 10th for Electro-Fi Records.

== Discography ==
=== Singles ===
- 1976 Boogie Jake (w/ Mark Hummel, harp): "Automobile Blues" b/w "The Boogie Train" (Blues Connoisseur Records)
- 1979 Bob Kelton (w/ Mark Hummel & The Blues Survivors): "Grandpa Said" b/w "Race Track Blues" (Rhodes-Way Records)
- 1979 Mississippi Johnny Waters & The Blues Survivors: "I'm Wondering Woman" b/w "You Can Look For Me" (Rhodes-Way Records)
- 1981 The Blues Survivors With Mark Hummel: "Gotta Make A Change" b/w "Sugar Sweet" (Rockinitus Records)

=== EPs ===
- 1979 Mississippi Johnny Waters & The Blues Survivors (Tree Of Hope Records)

=== As bandleader ===
- 1985 Playin' In Your Town (Rockinitus Records 101); w/ Bill Kirchen, Brownie McGhee
- 1987 High Steppin' (Double Trouble Records 3018)
- 1988 Harmonica Party (Double Trouble 3021)
- 1989 Up And Jumpin' (Rockinitus 103) w/ Sue Foley, Charles Brown
- 1990 Sunny Day Blues (Deluxe [Italy] Records 8001) w/ Sue Foley
- 1991 Hard Lovin' 1990s (Double Trouble 3029) w/ Junior Watson
- 1994 Feel Like Rockin' (Flying Fish 70634) w/ Charles Brown, Brownie McGhee, Sue Foley
- 1995 Married To The Blues (Flying Fish 70647) w/ Duke Robillard, Rusty Zinn, Charlie Musselwhite
- 1997 Heart Of Chicago (Tone-Cool/Rounder 1158) w/ Steve Freund, Barrelhouse Chuck, Bob Stroger, Willie "Big Eyes" Smith, Billy Flynn
- 1998 Low Down To Uptown (Tone-Cool/Rounder 1169) w/ Junior Watson, Charles Brown, Brenda Boykin, David Maxwell, Monster Mike Welch
- 1999 Harmonica Party: Vintage Mark Hummel (Mountain Top Productions Vol. 4) w/ Rusty Zinn
- 2002 Golden State Blues (Electro-Fi 3375) w/ Anson Funderburgh
- 2004 Blowin' My Horn (Electro-Fi 3386) w/ Mel Brown
- 2006 Ain't Easy No More (Electro-Fi 3398)
- 2008 Odds & Ends (Rockinitus) - compilation of three albums: High Steppin' , Up And Jumpin' , Sunny Day Blues.
- 2010 Retro–Active (Electro-Fi 3417) w/ The California Honeydrops, Rusty Zinn
- 2011 Unplugged: Back Porch Music (Mountain Top Productions) w/ Rusty Zinn
- 2012 Blue And Lonesome: Tribute To Little Walter [limited edition] (Rockinitus 1005) w/ Rusty Zinn, Bob Stroger, Willie Big Eyes Smith, Dave Myers, Billy Flynn
- 2014 The Hustle Is Really On (Electro-Fi 3439) w/ Little Charlie Baty, Anson Funderburgh
- 2016 Golden State Lone Star Blues Revue (Electro-Fi 3448) w/ Little Charlie Baty, Anson Funderburgh
- 2018 Harpbreaker (Electro-Fi 3456) [all instrumental]
- 2020 Wayback Machine ( Electro-Fi 3459) w/ Joe Beard, Billy Flynn, Rusty Zinn
- 2024 True Believer (Rockinitus 1004) w/ Billy Flynn, Junior Watson, Oscar Wilson, Joe Beard
- 2026 Road Dog (Rockinitus 1006)

=== As sideman ===
- 1978 Various Artists, San Francisco Blues Festival, Vol. 2 (Solid Smoke Records; w/ Charles Houff)
- 1985 Brownie McGhee, Facts of Life (Blue Rock'it Records)
- 1998 Various Artists, Blues Across America: The Chicago Scene (Cannonball Records; w/ Robert Plunkett)
- 2000 Too Slim and the Taildraggers, King Size Troublemakers (Burnside Records)
- 2003 Kid Andersen, Rock Awhile (Blue Soul Records) w/ Junior Watson
- 2004 Steve Freund & Dave Specter, Is What It Is (Delmark)
- 2004 Johnny Dyer & Mark Hummel, Rolling Fork Revisited (Mountain Top Productions 201) w/ Paul Oscher, Francis Clay, Rusty Zinn
- 2005 Jimi Bott, Live Volume 1: Cheap Thrills (Roseleaf Records) w/ Luther Tucker
- 2006 Various Artists, Revenge of Blind Joe Death: The John Fahey Tribute Album (Takoma; w/ Canned Heat)
- 2020 Duke Robillard, Blues Bash (Stony Plain) w/ Michele Wilson, Al Baisle, Doug James, Chris Cate

=== Anthologies ===
- 1991 Got Harp...If You Want It: The Best of The West Coast Blues Harp Players (Crosscut; Blue Rock'it)
- 1992 Texas Harmonica Rumble (New Rose; Dialtone)
- 1994 Blooze & Boogie: Blues Dance Party! (Vol. 1) (The Wax Museum)
- 1997 Blues Harp Greats (Easydisc/Rounder)
- 1998 Mean Streets Blues: A San Francisco Collection – 13 Stompin' Tracks! (Mean Streets/Biscuits & Blues)
- 2000 This Is The Blues Harmonica (Delmark 780)
- 2000 Blues Harp Meltdown, Vol. 1 (Mountain Top Productions) 2CD Kim Wilson, Rick Estrin, James Harman, Billy Branch, R.J. Mischo, Junior Watson
- 2002 Santa’s Got Mojo with various artists (Electro-Fi 3376)
- 2002 Blues Harp Meltdown, Vol. 2: East Meets West (Mountain Top Productions) 2CD Gary Primich, Annie Raines, R.J. Mischo, Johnny Dyer
- 2003 San Francisco Bay's Best Blues, Vol. 1 (Raw Records)
- 2006 Blues Harp Meltdown, Vol. 3: Legends (Mountain Top Productions) 2CD Carey Bell, Phil Wiggins, Lazy Lester
- 2007 Live At The Boston Blues Festival, Volume 1 (Blues Trust Productions)
- 2008 Blues Harmonica Blowouts: Still Here And Gone 1993–2007 (Electro-Fi 3410) 2CD Rick Estrin, Paul deLay, William Clarke, Magic Dick, Sam Myers, Lazy Lester, Lee Oskar, Carey Bell, James Harman
- 2009 Chicago Blues Party: Recorded Live! 1980–1992 (Mountain Top Productions 0013) Eddie Taylor, Jimmy Rogers, Luther Tucker
- 2013 Remembering Little Walter (Blind Pig 5154) featuring Billy Boy Arnold, Charlie Musselwhite, Mark Hummel, Sugar Ray Norcia, James Harman
- 2022 East Bay Blues Vaults 1976-1988 (Electro-Fi 3461) featuring Mark Hummel, Brownie McGhee, BBQ Barnes, Sonny Rhodes, Bob Kelton, Paris Slim, Mississippi Johnny Waters, J.J. Malone, Ron Thompson, Cool Papa, Boogie Jake
