= Sharrie Williams =

American singer-songwriter

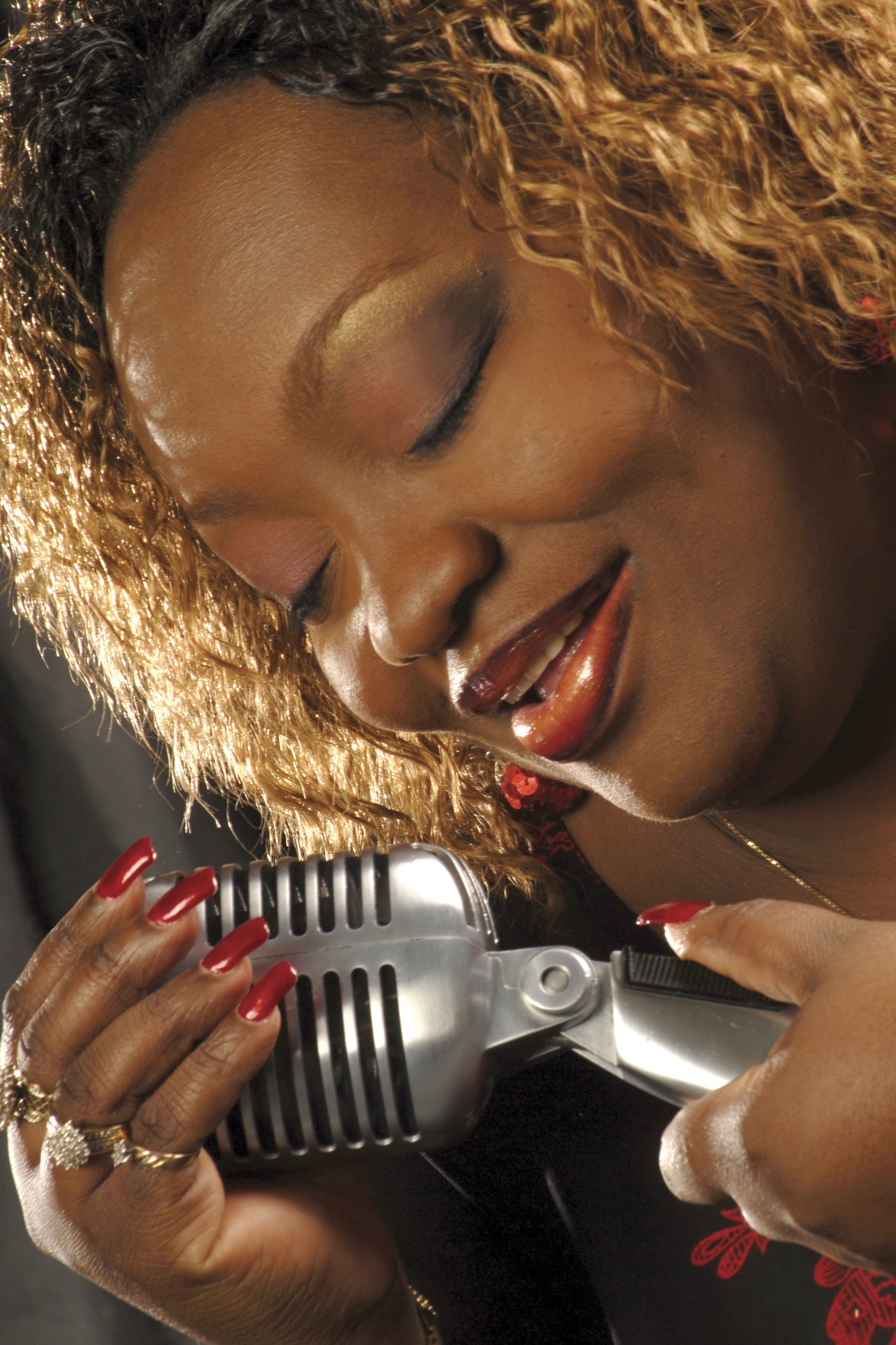
Sharrie Williams

Sharrie Williams (born January 3, 1965) is an American blues/soul/gospel singer-songwriter.

== History ==
Sharrie Williams grew up in the Daniel Heights Projects of Saginaw, Michigan, United States. She began singing in the church choir at the age of six, and by the time she was 12, she had begun touring and recording with the Greater Williams Temple church choir. Under the choir directorship of Hubert J. Williams, Williams performed and recorded with Shirley Caesar, The Winans, Dr. Mattie Moss Clark, and the Reverend James Cleveland.

In 1993, she toured with Snap Productions in a presentation of Michael Matthews’ gospel stage production, I Need A Man.

In 1996, she began singing with the house band at a club in Saginaw named Wise Guys. That house band quickly evolved into Sharrie Williams & The Wiseguys, and she met and later married the owner of Wise Guys, Norman "Pops" Crawford in 1998.

Sharrie Williams & The Wiseguys began appearing regularly at renowned Chicago blues clubs The Kingston Mines and Buddy Guy's Legends. 1998 saw Sharrie Williams & The Wiseguys on their way to Europe, starting with performances in Germany. Williams released her first CD in 2001 under her own Faith Records label, Sharrie Williams Live at Wise Guys. The live recording caught the attention of the Detroit Music Awards Committee, which earned her a nomination for their Best Blues Album of the Year award. By the end of 2003, Sharrie Williams & The Wiseguys had successfully toured France, Italy, The Netherlands, Spain, Africa, Sweden, Switzerland, Canada, and Great Britain.

In April 2004, Williams released Hard Drivin’ Woman on the German label, Crosscut Records. Williams followed up with Live at Bay-Car (2007), recorded live at the festival in Grande Synthe, France also on the Crosscut label. Studio albums I'm Here to Stay (2007), and Out of the Dark (2011), were released on the Canadian Electro-Fi Records label. Out of the Dark went on to win Blues Album of the Year Award from the Académie du Jazz.

Williams was nominated for a Blues Music Award in the 'Soul Blues Female Artist of the Year' category in 2012 and in 2009, and was nominated for a Blues Music Award in the 'Traditional Blues Female Artist of the Year' category in 2008. JAZZed magazine named Sharrie Williams the top 'World Artist' for 2014.

Williams has collaborated and appeared with Buddy Guy, Koko Taylor, Ruth Brown, Mavis Staples, Van Morrison, Dizzy Gillespie, Otis Clay, Larry McCray, Sugar Blue, Bobby Bland, Walter Trout, and Johnnie Taylor. Her influences include Koko Taylor, Etta James, Tina Turner, Patti LaBelle, Aretha Franklin, and Billie Holiday.

== Discography ==
=== As principal artist ===
- 2001 Live at Wiseguys (Faith Records)
- 2004 Hard Drivin' Woman (Crosscut Records)
- 2007 Live at Bay-Car Blues Festival (Crosscut)
- 2007 I'm Here To Stay (Electro-Fi)
- 2011 Out of The Dark (Electro-Fi)

=== Collaborations ===
- 2005 Otis Clay In The House - Live at Lucerne Vol.7 (Crosscut)
