= Diana Braithwaite =

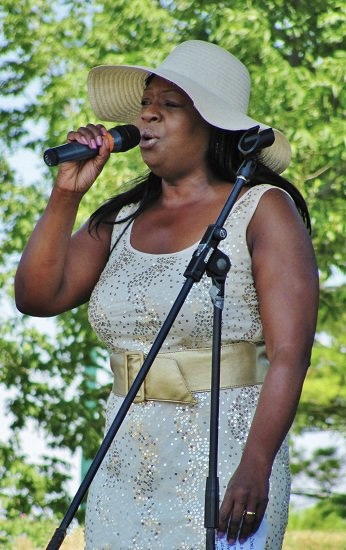
- Diana Braithwaite, May 2014

Background information
- Born: Toronto, Ontario, Canada
- Genres: Electric blues, country, jazz
- Occupation(s): Singer, songwriter, screenwriter
- Years active: 1990s–present
- Labels: Various including Electro-Fi Records
- Website: hotblues.ca

Diana Braithwaite is a Canadian electric blues singer, songwriter and screenwriter. She is a multiple Maple Blues Award winner. More recently she has teamed up with Chris Whiteley and they have been acclaimed as "blues icons" by the Toronto Star, and collectively have won nine Maple Blues Awards and had six Juno Award nominations. Although they are little known in the United States, Diana Braithwaite and Chris Whiteley are mainstays of the Canadian blues scene.

== Life and career ==
Braithwaite is a Black Canadian and a descendant of the Wellington County, Ontario, pioneers. Her ancestors escaped slavery in America through the Underground Railroad, and lived in the first African-Canadian pioneer settlement in Ontario. She was born and grew up in Toronto, as the second youngest of six children of Bob and Rella Braithwaite. She began performing professionally as a singer-songwriter in her teenage years, and opened for John Lee Hooker in Toronto, before touring as Albert Collins's opening act. In 1999, Braithwaite performed at Lilith Fair. In the same year, she released her debut album, In This Time.

Her solo shows have seen her share the stage with Mel Brown, T-Model Ford, and Jeff Healey, and she issued a single in the UK and Europe entitled, "Rollin' and Tumblin'".

Braithwaite performs with multi-instrumentalist Chris Whiteley. The duo recorded live at BBC Radio in London, England, with Bob Hall. Braithwaite and Whiteley have often worked together over the years, and in 2007 they released the album Morning Sun, a collection of original songs penned in a musical styling reminiscent of the 1930s and 1940s. It was issued by Electro-Fi Records.

They then toured North America, Europe, and the UK. Night Bird Blues (2009) had a five-week promotional tour in the UK, Russia, and Europe. The album peaked at number 2 on XM Satellite Radio. The follow-up release, Deltaphonic, reached number 1 on the same network. They performed at the Great British R & B Festival in Colne, Lancashire, England, in 2011, and the Monaghan Harvest Blues Festival in Ireland, plus the Hudson River Park Blues Festival in New York City, and had appearances on National Public Radio.

Their fifth joint album, Blues Stories, was released by Big City Blues Records in 2014. It contained a mixture of original songs and cover versions of older numbers.

== Awards ==
Braithwaite and Whiteley were named "Songwriter of the Year" at the 13th Maple Blues Awards.

Braithwaite is also the winner of the African-American Women in the Arts Award.

== Films ==
Braithwaite's film, Underground to Canada, aired on national television. Race to Freedom: The Underground Railroad, a 1994 film produced by Atlantis Films was nominated for a CableACE Award. Her songs, "Bad Luck Man" and "Blame It on the Bourbon", were featured on the soundtrack Gracie, which won a Gemini Award for Best Short Drama. Survivors was nominated for a Gemini Award and won the Golden Sheaf Award for 'best musical score'.

== Family ==
Her mother, Rella Braithwaite (née Aylestock), has written a number of books on African-Canadian history.

== See also ==
- Canadian blues
- List of electric blues musicians

== Discography ==
=== Albums ===
Year	Title	Record label	Credited to
1991	In This Time	Aural Tradition Records	Diana Braithwaite
2007	Morning Sun	Electro-Fi Records	Diana Braithwaite & Chris Whiteley
2009	Night Bird Blues	Electro-Fi Records	Diana Braithwaite & Chris Whiteley
2010	Deltaphonic	Electro-Fi Records	Diana Braithwaite & Chris Whiteley
2013	Scrap Metal Blues	Electro-Fi Records	Diana Braithwaite & Chris Whiteley
2014	Blues Stories	Big City Blues Records	Diana Braithwaite & Chris Whiteley
2016	Blues Country	Big City Blues Records	Diana Braithwaite & Chris Whiteley
2018	I Was Telling Him About You	Download only	Diana Braithwaite & Chris Whiteley
