= West Coast House Party =

Studio album by Kid Ramos
- Released: 2000
- Recorded: February 2000
- Genre: West Coast blues, jump blues
- Label: Evidence
- Producer: Kid Ramos

Kid Ramos chronology
Kid Ramos (1999)	West Coast House Party (2000)	Greasy Kid Stuff (2001)

West Coast House Party is an album by the American musician Kid Ramos, released in 2000. It was nominated for a W. C. Handy Award for best contemporary blues album. Ramos's third solo album, West Coast House Party was released through Evidence Music. Ramos supported it with a North American tour.

== Production ==
The album was recorded over two days in February 2000. Junior Watson, Clarence "Gatemouth" Brown, Duke Robillard, and Charlie Baty were among the many guest musicians who contributed to the recording sessions. Stephen Hodges played drums. Janiva Magness contributed backing vocals; her husband wrote "Happy Hour". Kim Wilson sang and played harmonica on "Real Gone Lover". "Love Don't Love Nobody" is a cover of the Roy Brown song. "House Party" was written by Amos Milburn. Ramos included a short history of jump blues in the album liner notes.

== Critical reception ==
Professional ratings
Review scores
Source	Rating
AllMusic	4/5 stars
The Austin Chronicle	2/5 stars
The Penguin Guide to Blues Recordings	3.5/4 stars
The Philadelphia Inquirer	4/4 stars
Pittsburgh Post-Gazette	3/4 stars

The Pittsburgh Post-Gazette praised the "swinging, danceable tracks that infuse new life into a classic blues style." The Austin Chronicle concluded that "everyone seems to be having a good time, playing and singing enthusiastically, and they're technically competent artists, but only the 76-year-old Brown is an original stylist." The Fort Worth Star-Telegram labeled the songs "danceable delights," and advised to "forget the new Brian Setzer and buy this instead." The Philadelphia Inquirer deemed the album "a delicious slab of greasy, horn-drenched jump-blues and R&B." The Times noted the return to "jump blues and boogies." The Virginian-Pilot said, "although no virtuoso, the Kid is adept at all styles, playing throughout the session with taste, economy and verve."

AllMusic called the album "a consistently exciting and joyously well-performed disc of upbeat jump blues, played with a one-take intensity that's contagious."

== Track listing ==
No.	Title	Length
1.	"Strollin' with Bone (Part 1)"
2.	"'Lizabeth"
3.	"Guitar Player"
4.	"Talking That Talk"
5.	"House Party"
6.	"Where Were You"
7.	"Love Don't Love Nobody"
8.	"Welcome Blues"
9.	"Bring It Home to Me"
10.	"Wipe Your Tears"
11.	"Happy Hour"
12.	"Real Gone Lover"
13.	"Silly Dilly Woman"
14.	"One Bar Shot"
15.	"One Mo' Peep"
16.	"Strollin' with Bone (Part 2)"
