= Route 666 (film) =

2001 film by William Wesley

- Directed by: William Wesley
- Written by: Scott Fivelson; Thomas Weber; William Wesley
- Produced by: Cami Winikoff; Terence M. O'Keefe; William Wesley
- Starring: Lou Diamond Phillips; Lori Petty; Steven Williams
- Cinematography: Philip Lee
- Edited by: Howard Flaer
- Music by: Terry Plumeri
- Distributed by: Lions Gate Entertainment
- Release dates: October 22, 2001 (Los Angeles); October 30, 2001 (United States)
- Running time: 86 minutes
- Country: United States
- Language: English
- Budget: $2,300,000 (estimated)

Route 666 is a 2001 action horror film directed by William Wesley and starring Lou Diamond Phillips, Lori Petty, Steven Williams, L.Q. Jones, Dale Midkiff, Alex McArthur, and Mercedes Colon. In the film, government agents are besieged by the ghosts of a massacred chain gang while driving down a desert highway.

== Plot ==
At a bar in Arizona, Fred "Rabbit" Smith is handcuffed by Federal Marshals Jack La Roca and Stephanie, assigned to bring Rabbit to Los Angeles to testify against mobster Benny "The Buzzsaw" Buffalino. Rabbit is being hunted by hitmen contracted by Benny and led by Sergei. Jack calls for a car driven by four other marshals to pick them up before Sergei's men arrive. Marshals Nick, Mary, P.T., and Joe kill all of the assassins but Sergei. The group departs for Los Angeles.

Jack learns that highway U.S. Route 666, exists next to Route 66, leading more quickly to the California border. Route 666 was condemned after a prison road crew accident. Hearing the story, Jack has flashbacks of four prisoners digging a hole surrounded by law enforcement.

The marshals reach a deserted tourist attraction bordering Route 666. As Jack considers using the road, he experiences more flashbacks and tells Stephanie that he was born nearby and his mother died when he was six; he hardly knew his father.

A county sheriff's deputy, Gil, sees the marshals go down Route 666 and requests backup. His father, Sheriff Conaway, tells him to leave the road, but Gil pulls the vehicles over. Jack and P.T. confront him, and Gil tells them the road is restricted. When Jack shows his badge, Gil leaves. Rabbit and the marshals spot a cemetery. Jack and Stephanie find Jack's father, John La Roca's grave. P.T. finds three others: Miles Hackman, Frank Slater, and Steven Pikowski, infamous murderers from the 1960s. La Roca was a bank robber who quit after getting married and having Jack. La Roca later robbed a bank for his family, but was caught and thrown in prison with the murderers.

Mary and Nick leave Joe to watch Rabbit while they go into the Suburban and have sex. Sergei appears and shoots at Rabbit and Joe, who kills Sergei. The undead corpses of Slater, La Roca, Pikowski, and Hackman appear and kill Joe.

Nick falls asleep in one car and is killed by Slater. The rest of the group goes to check on Nick while Rabbit is handcuffed to a pole. Pikowski attacks him, but Rabbit escapes. Rabbit realizes that the zombies can only travel on the road and concrete/cement and appear from underground. Jack spots a telephone booth and dials 911, connecting with Sheriff Conaway. Jack gives him the number of the Los Angeles Marshal’s office and tells him to request backup.

Jack has another flashback and sees his father, Slater, Hackman, and Pikowski working on a road. Hackman attempts to escape while John avoids the conflict. The escape fails, and an unseen police officer makes them dig a hole. In the present, Sheriff Conaway and his deputies, Tim and Gil, approach. Jack and Rabbit hide in the bathroom stall while Conaway and his officers hold the others at gunpoint. Conaway kills Mary in order to make P.T. tell him where Jack and Rabbit are.

Jack captures Gil and drives away before handcuffing Gil to the truck. Gil begs Jack not to stay on the road, stating the zombies will kill them. The four zombies arrive and kill Gil. Jack returns to the others. Conaway goes to the truck, thinking Gil is in it, and P.T. fights Tim, who kills P.T. before Rabbit kills Tim. Jack restrains Conaway to the SUV.

Jack has a final flashback. The previously unseen officer is Sheriff Conaway. Though La Roca did not assist the attempted escape, he is thrown into the hole dug by the others. Conaway and his men shoot the convicts in their legs, then bury the four men alive. After Conaway and his thugs learn about the zombies' return, they kill anyone who sets foot on the road to cover up their crimes.

Jack assaults Conaway, who begs him not to be in the road. The zombies arrive, pinning Jack down. When Jack tells John that he is his son, John kills the other zombies.

John gives Jack his dog tag before crossing into Heaven, lifting the curse on Route 666. Conaway emerges from the SUV and tries to shoot the others, but Jack, Steph, and Rabbit shoot him, and is killed by a ghost road roller. Jack, Steph and Rabbit, then walk to Los Angeles.

== Cast ==
- Lou Diamond Phillips as Deputy U.S. Marshal Jack La Roca
- Lori Petty as Deputy U.S. Marshal Stephanie "Steph"
- Dale Midkiff as Deputy U.S. Marshal P.T.
- Alex McArthur as Deputy U.S. Marshal Nick
- Mercedes Colon as Deputy U.S. Marshal Mary
- Rob Roy Fitzgerald as Deputy U.S. Marshal Joe
- Steven Williams as Fred "Rabbit" Smith
- L.Q. Jones as Sheriff Bob Conaway
- Adam Vernier as Deputy Gil Conaway
- Chester E. Tripp as Deputy Tim Conaway
- Dick Miller as The Bartender
- Gary Farmer as Shaman
- Anne Lockhart as The Radio Dispatcher
- Rhino Michaels as John La Roca
- Gary Roberts as Steven "Pickaxe" Pikowski
- Peewee Piemonte as Miles "Jackhammer" Hackman
- Michael Chance as Frank "Sledgehammer" Slater
- Sven-Ole Thorsen as Sergei, Russian Hitman
- Michael R. Long as Hitman #1
- John Cade as Hitman #2
- Chuck Hicks as Prison Guard #1
- Stephen R. Hudis as Prison Guard #2
- Nick Plantico as Jeep Victim (uncredited)

== Soundtrack ==
The film soundtrack included the track "I'm Walkin'" performed by Lightnin' Willie & the Poorboys.

== See also ==
- List of ghost films
