= Bobby Dean Blackburn =

- Born: Robert Arlen Winston Blackburn
- Origin: Toronto, Ontario, Canada
- Genres: Blues, Funk, Soul, R&B, Jazz, Rock
- Years active: since 1959
- Label: Electro-Fi Records

Robert (alias Bobby Dean) Blackburn (born 1940) is a Canadian blues and rock ‘n’ roll musician. Blackburn is known as a major contributor to Toronto’s bustling Yonge Street in the blues heyday of the 1950s and 60s.

== History ==
Bobby Dean Blackburn was born in Toronto, Canada in 1941, and got his start in 1956 as the lead singer of Bobby Dean and the Gems who played regularly at the Zanzibar a Go Go club (now known as the Zanzibar Tavern) and Club Bluenote on Yonge Street in Toronto, Canada. His contributions to live music at Club Bluenote are commemorated in the plaque erected at the intersection of Yonge and Elm St. He has shared the stage with esteemed performers including Bo Diddley, Rick James, Taj Mahal, Jimmy Smith, and Paul Butterfield.

Robbie Robertson of The Band mentions Bobby Dean and The Gems in his 2016 autobiography Testimony. When speaking of the very early days of rock ‘n’ roll in Toronto, when both Blackburn and Robertson were trying to break into the scene, Robbie says, “I liked a group called the Gems, featuring Bobby Blackburn on vocals, one of the only young Black R&B singers in Toronto.”

Blackburn released his first studio album, Don’t Ask … Don’t Tell (Electro-Fi Records), in 2010. He was inducted into the Mississauga Music Walk of Fame in 2016. In 2024, he was nominated for the Maple Blues: Blues With a Feeling Award for lifetime achievement.

Bobby Dean Blackburn is the father of four musical sons, three of whom are core members of the twice JUNO-nominated Blackburn Brothers blues band.

His family legacy of Black activism and resilience reaches back to his great grandfather Elias Earls who escaped slavery in Kentucky and settled in Owen Sound, Canada at the northern terminus of the Underground Railroad in the 1800s. Descendants of those who came to Canada through the Underground Railroad and settled in Owen Sound mark Emancipation Day annually at the longest running emancipation celebration in North America, the Owen Sound Emancipation Festival, established in 1862.

Blackburn continues to perform blues, r&b, and gospel across Canada.

== Personal life ==
Blackburn was born in Canada to a black father and a biracial mother. One of his ancestors Elias Earls escaped from slavery in Kentucky via the Underground Railroad.

== Discography ==
Don't Ask... Don't Tell (2010, Electro-Fi Records)

== Awards ==
| Year | Award | Result | Reference |
|---|---|---|---|
| 2016 | Mississauga Music Walk of Fame Induction | Won | |
| 2020 | Ontario Black History Society Addie Aylestock Award | Won | |
| 2024 | Maple Blues Award, Blues With a Feeling (Lifetime Achievement) | Nominated | |
