= Raphael Wressnig =

- Born: October 14, 1979 (age 46); Graz, Austria
- Genres: Jazz; blues; funk
- Occupations: Organist, songwriter, producer
- Instrument: Hammond Organ
- Website: www.raphaelwressnig.com

Raphael Wressnig (born October 14, 1979 in Graz, Austria) is a jazz, blues, funk organist, songwriter and producer. He recorded 17 albums of his own, as well as appearing on some 35 others as a guest. In 2013 and 2015 he received a nomination for "best organ player of the year" by Down Beat magazine.

== Discography ==
- MANIC ORGANIC (2002)
- IN BETWEEN (2004)
- MOSQUITO BITE (2006) w/Enrico Crivellaro
- BOOM BELLO! (2006)
- CUT A LITTLE DEEPER ON THE FUNK (2007)
- DON'T BE AFRAID TO GROOVE (2008) w/Alex Schultz
- LIVE AT THE OFF FESTIVAL (2009) w/Enrico Crivellaro
- PARTY FACTOR (2010)
- TRUE BLUE (2011)
- SOUL GIFT (2012) w/Alex Schultz
- SOUL GUMBO (2014)
- THE SOUL CONNECTION (2016) w/Igor Prado
- CAPTURED LIVE (2017)
- CHICKEN BURRITO (2018) w/Alex Schultz
- Santa Likes To Boogaloo! (7" single) (2020) w/Igor Prado
- GROOVE & GOOD TIMES (2021) w/Igor Prado
- ORGAN GRINDER (digital single) (2022)
- LIVE: MORE GROOVE, MORE GOOD TIMES (2023) w/Igor Prado
- SOULFUL CHRISTMAS (With A Funky Twist) (2023) w/Alex Schultz
- COMMITTED (2025)
