= Johnny Laws =

American Chicago blues musician

- Born: January 12, 1943; Chicago, Illinois, United States
- Died: March 28, 2021 (aged 78)
- Genres: Chicago blues, electric blues
- Occupations: Guitarist, singer, songwriter
- Instruments: Guitar, vocals
- Years active: Mid-1960s–present
- Labels: Wolf Records, Electro-Fi Records

Johnny Laws (January 12, 1943 – March 28, 2021) was an American Chicago blues guitarist, singer and songwriter. A regular performer for over half a century in Chicago's South Side clubs, Laws released two albums, including Burnin' in My Soul, of which Blues & Rhythm magazine in November 1999 noted, "It's a real shame that Johnny Laws has been unjustly ignored in the past... This is an enjoyable CD... Full marks to those folks at Electro-Fi."

His version of McKinley Mitchell's "End of the Rainbow" demonstrated his versatility and vocal range.

In an April 1999 editorial leader, the Toronto Star remarked that "South Side Chicago fave Johnny Laws... [is] winning plaudits for his seductive, soul-drenched blues."

== Life and career ==
Laws was born in Chicago, Illinois, and remained there all his life. He played and performed on the South Side of Chicago from the mid-1960s, remaining largely a local cult favorite for decades. He learned his Chicago blues craft mainly from listening to Jimmy Reed and Buster Benton. His aching falsetto voice and vast repertoire gained much local acclaim. His style ranged from soul to postwar blues to, occasionally, country music. In addition to a regular weekend slot at the Cuddle Inn, Laws was a frequent performer at the annual Chicago Blues Festival, including a set in 2000. Laws was featured in a 1993 issue of Living Blues magazine.

Laws released his debut album, My Little Girl, for Wolf Records in 1995. The album contained a couple of blues standards, but most of the songs were written by Laws.

His second album, Blues Burnin' in My Soul, was released on Electro-Fi Records in 1999, containing cover versions of Junior Wells's song "Little by Little"; "Steal Away", by Jimmy Hughes; "Honest I Do" and "Ain't That Lovin' You Baby", by Jimmy Reed; and "Sadie", written and originally recorded by Hound Dog Taylor. The autumn 1999 issue of Juke Blues stated that "Johnny Laws has a smooth, silky voice, at times almost a whisper, then rising into a falsetto, and falling back again into gentle expressiveness... His appeal is in a delivery that seems so deceptively effortless".

Laws died on March 28, 2021, at the age of 78.

== Discography ==
=== Albums ===
Year	Title	Record label
1995	My Little Girl	Wolf Records
1999	Blues Burnin' in My Soul	Electro-Fi Records

== See also ==
- List of Chicago blues musicians
- List of electric blues musicians
