= Zanzibar Tavern =

Adult entertainment nightclub in Toronto, Ontario, Canada

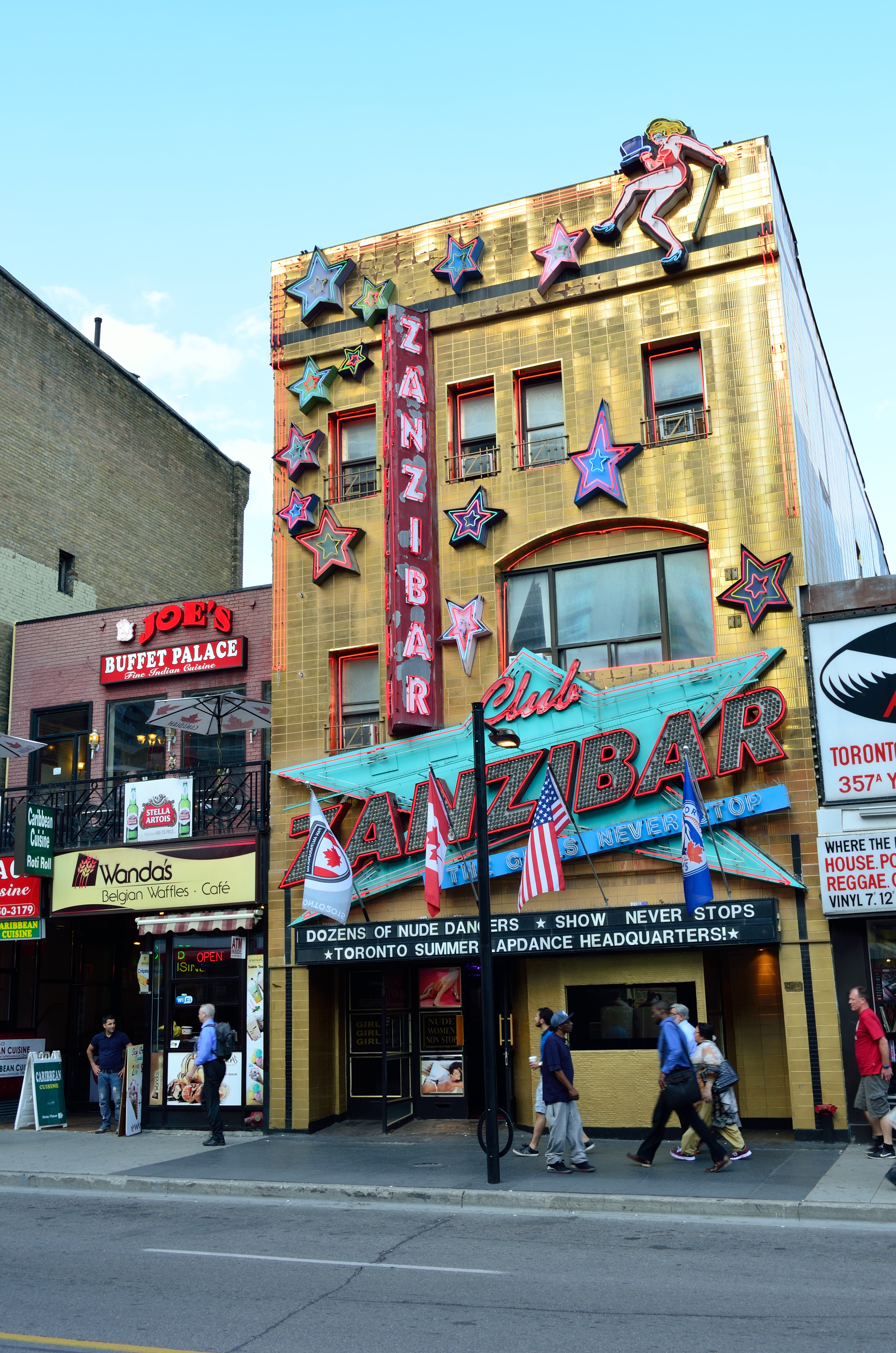
- Zanzibar Tavern in 2015
- Interactive map of Zanzibar Tavern
- Address: 359 Yonge Street; Toronto, Ontario; Canada
- Coordinates: 43.65814°N 79.3815°W
- Owner: Cooper family
- Operator: Allen Cooper
- Type: Strip club (previously restaurant and live-music venue)

Construction
- Built: 1895
- Opened: 1951 (as Zanzibar Tavern)
- Architects: Burke and Horwood

The Zanzibar Tavern is an adult entertainment nightclub and local landmark on Yonge Street in Toronto, Ontario, Canada. Opened in 1951 as a restaurant and live-entertainment venue, it was acquired by David Cooper and a family member around 1960 and subsequently developed into a prominent live-music club before gradually becoming a strip club. It became a longtime fixture of Toronto's Yonge Street strip.

The building occupied by Zanzibar dates from 1895 and was originally constructed for an undertaking business. On August 16, 2026, the Zanzibar was extensively damaged by a three-alarm fire. Its roof collapsed and the interior of the building was gutted, although no injuries were reported.

== History ==
=== Building and early uses ===
The three-storey building at 359 Yonge Street was constructed in 1895 for undertakers John Young and Alexander Millard. Designed by the Toronto architectural firm Burke and Horwood, it contained the firm's undertaking business as well as residential quarters. Architectural drawings of the building were subsequently published in the Canadian Architect and Builder in 1899.

Young and Millard's undertaking business remained associated with the property into the early 20th century. During the following decades, the building housed a succession of residential and commercial tenants, including a piano business, photographic studio and cafe.

The Rosticceria Tavern opened at the property in 1947. It operated as a restaurant and dining lounge serving American and French cuisine and included an entertainment area called the Elixir Room. A 1950 City of Toronto Archives photograph shows the Rosticceria Tavern occupying the ground floor at 359 Yonge Street alongside Hunter's Studio.

The Rosticceria closed for renovations in 1951 and the premises reopened as the Zanzibar Tavern on November 15 of that year. Zanzibar was initially promoted as a restaurant and live-entertainment venue, advertising itself as "Toronto's Finest Dining Room" and offering lunch, dinner and post-theatre meals alongside live singers and musicians.

=== David Cooper and live music ===
David Cooper was born to Jewish parents Harry and Bessie, who ran a business in Kensington Market. When he was 18, he operated his own shop on the Danforth, where he met his future wife, Annette.

Around 1960, Cooper and a family member acquired the Zanzibar. Cooper's son Allen later said his parents had started operating the club in 1960, while historical directory research places Cooper's purchase in 1961.

Under Cooper, Zanzibar became one of the live-music venues that formed Toronto's Yonge Street entertainment strip. It featured jazz, blues, rhythm and blues and rock musicians, as well as jam sessions that attracted both local performers and visiting musicians.

By 1965, Zanzibar had a large dance floor and continuous live entertainment and had introduced go-go dancers who performed alongside the bands under multicoloured lighting. Cooper initially employed three regular go-go dancers. By 1968, the club reportedly had six dancers, including four performing topless while wearing pasties.

The house band during part of this period included singer and organist Bobby Dean Blackburn, whose group performed rhythm and blues, rock and jazz in afternoon sessions. In 1967, local newspapers dubbed the Yonge Street strip "Psychedelic Avenue" as Zanzibar competed with neighbouring establishments in a "war of the watts". Cooper described creating a "Twenty-first Century total environment", incorporating stroboscopic lighting, mannequins and closed-circuit cameras that projected images of the dance floor onto the walls.

=== Adult entertainment ===
The introduction of go-go dancing was followed by an increasing emphasis on topless and burlesque entertainment. By 1973 the establishment was known as the Zanzibar Circus Tavern, with circus-themed signs and an additional downstairs entertainment space called the Circus Cellar.

Live music continued alongside the adult entertainment during the 1970s. By the 1980s, however, adult entertainment had become the Zanzibar's principal business and it had developed into a full-time strip club. Burlesque performer Annie Ample appeared at the Zanzibar during the 1980s and described it as her favourite venue.

In 2001, the exterior underwent a $300,000 Las Vegas-inspired renovation that included gold-glazed tiles and extensive illuminated signage. In 2006, David Cooper's son Allen Cooper left his legal practice to take over operation of the Zanzibar.

The establishment suffered serious damage to its facade in June 2010 when black bloc protesters vandalized businesses along Yonge Street during the 2010 G-20 Toronto summit protests. The club received nearly $6,000 in compensation.

Later that year, the club attracted attention after a librarian from nearby Ryerson University photographed dancers and wait staff while they were on breaks on the club's rooftop. The photographs were subsequently published by Torontoist. Cooper said the women believed their privacy had been violated.

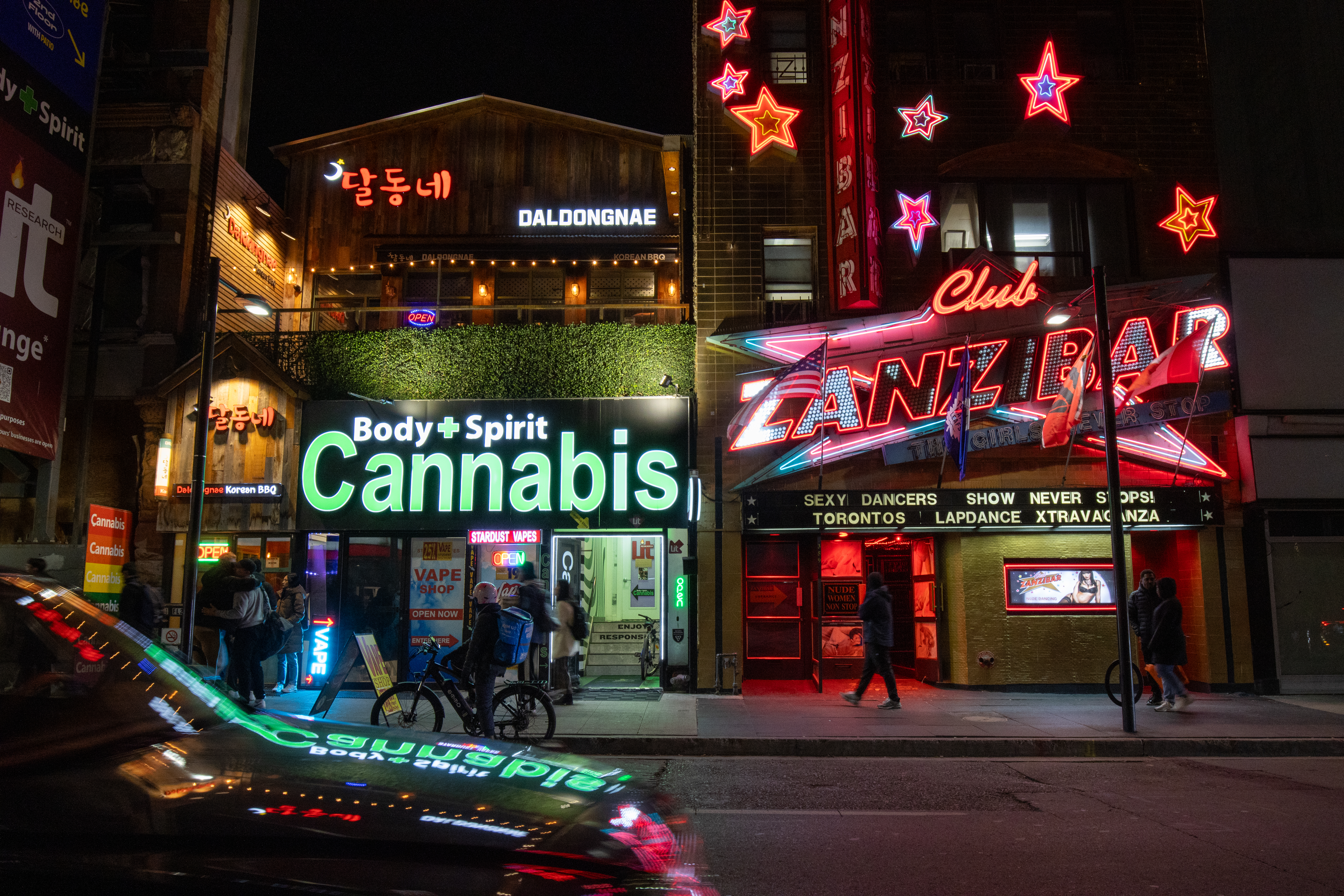
Zanzibar Tavern in November 2023

In 2017, Zanzibar received a notice of violation for advertising on a 78-inch LED television facing Yonge Street at ground level. Cooper argued that Zanzibar had advertised in its front window for decades and that a 2010 sign bylaw prohibiting storefront video advertising should not apply retroactively.

David Cooper died in 2019 at age 84. The tavern remained owned and operated by the Cooper family.

In 2021, Zanzibar partnered with Maggie's Toronto Sex Workers Action Project to operate a low-barrier COVID-19 vaccination clinic.

=== 2026 fire ===
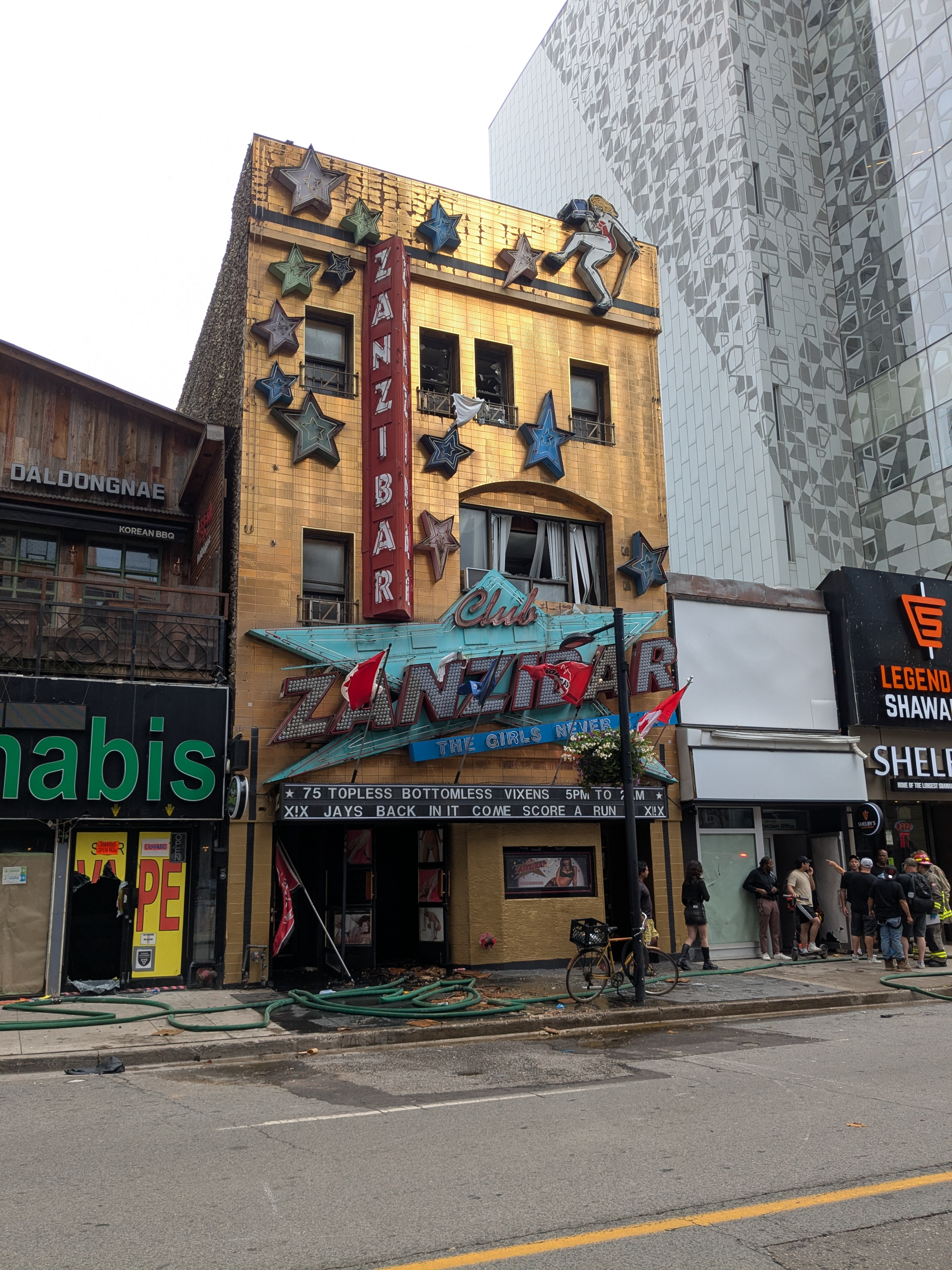
Zanzibar building in the afternoon after the 2026 fire

Shortly after 6 a.m. on August 16, 2026, Toronto Fire Services responded to reports of heavy smoke coming from the Zanzibar building at 359 Yonge Street, near Elm Street. Upon arrival, firefighters encountered dense black smoke and visible flames at roof level, prompting an upgrade to a three-alarm response.

Crews initially entered the structure but were later forced to withdraw as conditions rapidly worsened, continuing suppression efforts from outside the building. The fire was brought largely under control by mid-morning, though smoke continued to linger in the surrounding area.

Toronto Fire Chief Jim Jessop described the blaze as deep-seated and confirmed that it caused significant structural damage. During the incident, part of the roof collapsed. By the afternoon, a firefighter at the scene confirmed that the roof had collapsed and that the interior of the building had been gutted.

No one was inside the building at the time the fire broke out, and no injuries were reported. Jessop noted that the close proximity of neighbouring structures complicated firefighting efforts, though adjacent buildings were ultimately spared.

Allen Cooper stated that the club sustained "a fair bit of damage" and expressed devastation on behalf of staff and management. He estimated the Zanzibar employed around 30 regular staff and hosted between 100 and 200 dancers weekly, adding that he hoped to rebuild and reopen the venue "bigger and better".

Toronto Fire's investigations unit was assigned to determine the cause of the blaze. Officials indicated there were no immediate signs of suspicious circumstances.

The fire led to the closure of Yonge Street in both directions between Gerrard Street East and Edward Street, as well as a portion of nearby Gerrard Street. The Toronto Metropolitan University Student Learning Centre was temporarily closed during the emergency response and reopened later that morning at approximately 11 a.m.

== Popular culture ==
The Zanzibar has appeared in films including The Incredible Hulk. It also appeared in episodes of Degrassi: The Next Generation.

The club has also figured in litigation, including a case involving a man who sued his wife, a former Zanzibar dancer, alleging that she had knowingly infected him with HIV.

== See also ==
- List of strip clubs
- Metro Theatre (Toronto)
