= Rella Braithwaite =

Canadian author (1923–2019)

Rella A. Braithwaite
- Born: January 29, 1923; Lebanon, Ontario, Canada
- Died: July 23, 2019 (aged 96)
- Spouse: Bob Braithwaite
- Children: Diana Braithwaite

Rella Aylestock Braithwaite (January 29, 1923 – July 23, 2019) was a Canadian author.

She was born in Mapleton, Ontario, a descendant of Black pioneers who settled in the Queen's Bush area. Her ancestors escaped slavery in America through the Underground Railroad, and lived in the first African-Canadian pioneer settlement in Ontario. Braithwaite was educated in Listowel, Ontario. In 1946, she and her husband Bob settled in the Toronto suburb of Scarborough Township; she served on the local school board. She wrote a column on Black history for the Contrast newspaper. In 1975, Braithwaite published The Black Woman in Canada on outstanding Canadian Black women. She also helped the Ministry of Education in Ontario develop a Black Studies guide for use in the classroom.

Her daughter is singer Diana Braithwaite.
