= The Mannish Boys =

Los Angeles blues band

- Origin: Los Angeles, California, United States
- Genre: Blues
- Years active: 2004–present
- Label: Delta Groove Productions
- Members: Bobby Jones; Johnny Dyer; Randy Chortkoff; Franck Goldwasser (Paris Slim); Kirk Fletcher; Willie J. Campbell; Jimi Bott; Sugaray Rayford
- Past members: Finis Tasby; Kid Ramos; Leon Blue; Tom Leavey; Ronnie James Weber; June Core; Richard Innes
- Website: TheMannishBoys.com

The Mannish Boys is an American blues band based in Los Angeles. They play classic blues in West Coast, Texas and Chicago styles.

Founded by bandleader Randy Chortkoff, the band is named after the song "Mannish Boy" by Muddy Waters.

Led by vocalist Finis Tasby, the band consists of all-star veteran members of the West Coast blues scene. The band debuted from Delta Groove Productions in 2004 with the album That Represent Man. The members on the debut CD were Finis Tasby (vocals), Kirk Fletcher (guitar), Franck Goldwasser (guitar), Leon Blue (piano), Tom Leavey (originally on bass guitar), Ronnie James Weber (bass) and June Core (drums). The CD featured guests including Roy Gaines, Paul Oscher, and Mickey Champion. They made appearances at festivals in the U.S., Canada, and also in Europe.

Bobby Jones, a blues and soul vocalist from Chicago came on board as a special guest on Big Plans (2007), and became an official member soon after.

The Mannish Boys Lowdown Feelin' was nominated in the 8th Annual Independent Music Awards for 'Blues Album of the Year'.

Their rendition of the song "Mannish Boy" was featured during the credits at the end of the 2007 romantic comedy movie, What Love Is.

In 2013, Double Dynamite won the Blues Music Award in the 'Traditional Blues Album' category, and the group was also nominated in the 'Band' category. They were nominated in the 'Band of the Year' category again in 2014.

== Discography ==
- 2004: That Represent Man (Delta Groove Productions)
- 2005: Live & In Demand (Delta Groove Productions)
- 2007: Big Plans (Delta Groove Productions)
- 2008: Lowdown Feelin' (Delta Groove Productions)
- 2010: Shake For Me (Delta Groove Productions)
- 2012: Double Dynamite (Delta Groove Productions)
- 2014: Wrapped Up And Ready (Delta Groove Productions)
