= Leon Blue =

American pianist (born 1931)

Leon Blue (born September 19, 1931) is an American pianist. He has played with Ike & Tina Turner, Lowell Fulson, Albert Collins, B.B. King, Albert King, Roy Milton, Little Joe Blue, and many others. Blue also recorded as a member of the Manish Boys.

== Life and career ==
Leon Blue was born the second of four children in Wichita Falls, Texas on September 19, 1931. At the age of 11, Blue began taking piano lessons with the local piano instructor Miss grimes. After hearing the song "Honky Tonk Train Blues" by Meade Lux Lewis, Blues was inspired to play boogie-woogie, which he learned by ear. By the age of 15, Blue was playing gigs with local blues musicians "Big Daddy" Pat and Charles Buck. While still in high school, Blue operated a shoeshine stand at the Trailways bus station. The bus station was across from the Miller Brothers Ballroom, where Blue met Western swing musician Bob Wills. They formed a friendship and Blue played with him every time he came into town.

After graduating from Booker T. Washington High School in 1949, Blue attended Bishop College for two years on a football and baseball scholarship, before he was drafted by the U.S. Army during the Korean War. He played alongside Ernie Banks with the black baseball team Black Spudders in Wichita Falls. Due to his athletics abilities and musicianship, he was a member of the Special Services.

After Blue was discharged from the army, he moved to Los Angeles to live with his sister and played local gigs. His first road gig was with Lowell Fulson, and he spent the next few years working on and off with Roy Milton, Big Jim Wynn, and the T-Bone Walker Band.

Blue's big break came when bandleader Ike Turner saw him around Los Angeles and asked him to join his band, the Kings of Rhythm. After Blue did a month-long gig in Alaska, he joined Turner in Oklahoma City and played his first gig with him in Norman, Oklahoma. Blue played with Turner from 1965 to 1978. "He was the greatest. If you didn't make rehearsal, you didn't make the gig. He had a dress code...It was a professional show all the way," said Blue. Turner also paid well. "He'd pay you $250 per show. If you played more than one show a night, you got paid double." As a member of the Ike & Tina Turner Revue, Blue travelled all over the world. While the revue had a residency in Las Vegas, he met Elvis Presley who was performing at the same hotel. Blue tried cocaine once, but it affected his sexual performance and so he decided not to do drugs, which led to his nickname "Country Bumpkin."

After his tenure with Turner, Blue worked with Albert King and Albert Collins. He played with Collins until his death in 1993. Blue played with B.B. King on the road and in the studio, particularly in 2004. He stated that King was his favorite guy to work with. "B.B. was a good guy and started you off at $3,500 a week. if you were off, he paid $1,750 week."

In 2004, Blue was featured on the album That Represent Man as a member of the Mannish Boys. He played with the group for a few years. In the last twenty years, Blue has played blues festivals and performed on the Legendary Rhythm & Blues Cruise.

In 2012, Blue was inducted into the Oklahoma Blues Hall of Fame.

In 2015, Blue appeared in TV One's Unsung documentary, "The Story of Ike Turner".

Blue lives and works in Las Vegas. In 2019, Blue turned down an offer to play with Eric Clapton because he was too cheap.

== Discography ==
=== Singles ===
- 1966: Lowell Fulsom, Leon Blue & Band – "Stop And Think" (Movin' Records MR 128)

=== Album credits ===
- 1991: Harmonica Fats & The Bernie Pearl Blues Band – I Had To Get Nasty (Bee Bump Records)
- 1993: Albert King – Rainin' In California (Wolf Records)
- 2003: Phillip Walker – Live In Paris (Gilkey Records)
- 2004: The Mannish Boys – That Represent Man (Delta Groove Productions, Inc.)
- 2005: The Mannish Boys – Live & In Demand (Delta Groove Productions, Inc.)
- 2007: The Mannish Boys – Big Plans (Delta Groove Productions, Inc.)
