= Harmonica Shah =

American singer

- Also known as: Seward Daward Shah
- Born: Thaddeus Louis Hall; March 31, 1946 (age 80); Oakland, California, United States
- Genres: Detroit blues, electric blues
- Occupations: Harmonicist, singer, songwriter
- Instruments: Harmonica, vocals
- Years active: 1970s–present
- Labels: Blue Suit, South Side, Electro-Fi

Seward Daward Shah, known as Harmonica Shah (born March 31, 1946) is an American Detroit and electric blues harmonicist and singer. His playing was influenced by Junior Wells, Jimmy Reed, Little Walter, Lazy Lester, and Little Sonny.

== Biography ==
Born Thaddeus Louis Hall, in Oakland, California, Shah also spent time in Somerville, Texas, with his blues harmonica and guitar playing grandfather, Sam Dawson. Dawson had recorded for both Alan Lomax and Duke Records. His mother, a beautician, encouraged him to be a salesman for Jet magazine in the latter part of the 1950s. This allowed Shah access to Oakland's bars and clubs, where he heard musicians such as Lowell Fulson, Jimmy McCracklin, Juke Boy Bonner and Big Mama Thornton.

Shah told Living Blues magazine that his grandfather's passion for the blues inspired him. "Well see I picked it up from him, he'd be out in the fields singin' all that (sings in a slow moan) 'Tell me how long, whoa, tell me how long it's been since you've been away from home' Well, that's raw! That's a big damn difference from 'Good Golly Miss Molly'".

He moved to Detroit in 1967, and worked for Ford Motors for fifteen years. Shah bought himself a cheap harmonica in 1976 and, while operating as a taxicab driver, Shah was introduced to local blues jam sessions. "Hell, that was it, no turning back then", Shah recalled.

Over the years, Shah has played alongside Bobo Jenkins, Eddie Kirkland, The Butler Twins and Willie D. Warren. His debut album, Motor City Mojo was released by Blue Suit Records in 2000. Deep Detroit the follow-up album features Detroit rock turned blues guitarist Howard Glazer.

His 2006 album, Listen at Me Good, was recorded in Toronto, and included contributions from the Blues Music Award winners Mel Brown on guitar, and Willie "Big Eyes" Smith playing the drums, along with Julian Fauth on piano.

He has toured across the United States, as well as in Europe, Russia, Japan and Australia. Closer to his roots, Shah still occasionally performs for free at John's Carpet House in East Detroit. He legally changed his birth name to Seward Shah.

Shah's more recent release was the 2009 album, If All You Have Is a Hammer, on his current record label, Electro-Fi Records.

== Discography ==
=== Albums ===
- Motor City Mojo (2000) – Blue Suit Records 114
- Deep Detroit (2001) – South Side Records 4
- Tell It to Your Landlord (2003) – Electro-Fi Records 3373
- Listen at Me Good (2006) – Electro-Fi Records 3393
- If All You Have Is a Hammer (2009) – Electro-Fi Records 3413
- Live at the Cove (2011) – Electro-Fi Records 3422
- Havin' Nothin' Don't Bother Me (2013) – Electro-Fi Records 3436
- If You Live To Get Old, You Will Understand (2015) – Electro-Fi Records 3447
- Ain't Gonna Worry About Tomorrow (2020) - Electro-Fi Records 3460

=== Compilation albums ===
- Hastings Street Grease Vol. 1 (1998) – Blue Suit Records
- Hastings Street Grease Vol. 2 (1999) – Blue Suit Records

== See also ==
- List of Detroit blues musicians
