= Morgan Davis =

Canadian blues singer-songwriter and guitarist

Morgan Davis is a Canadian blues singer, guitarist, and songwriter.

He was born and spent his childhood in Detroit, Michigan, before relocating to Toronto, Ontario, Canada. He moved to Halifax, Nova Scotia, in 2001.

His song "Why'd You Lie" was a hit for Colin James and featured on James' 1988 debut album. "Reefer Smokin' Man" was described as a "blues cult classic". Davis' principal major label release, Morgan Davis, on Stony Plain Records, was produced by Colin Linden. Davis was the recipient of multiple awards, including a Juno Award, for his 2003 release, Painkiller, on Electro-Fi Records.

== Awards ==
- 2005 Maple Blues Award, Songwriter of the Year
- 2004 JUNO Award, Blues Album of the Year: Painkiller
- 2004 Maple Blues Award, Recording of the Year: Painkiller
- 2004 Maple Blues Award, Male Vocalist of the Year
- 2004 Maple Blues Award, SOCAN Songwriter of the Year
- 2004 Maple Blues Award, Producer of the Year (with Alec Fraser): Painkiller
- 2000 Toronto Blues Society, Acoustic Artist of the Year
- 1999 Maple Blues Award, Producer of the Year: Blues Medicine
- 1999 Maple Blues Award, SOCAN Songwriter of the Year
- 1996 Toronto Blues Society, Blues with a Feeling Award
- 1995 Jazz Report, Blues Band of the Year
- 1994 Jazz Report, Blues Artist of the Year

== Discography ==
- 2014 I Got My Own (Electro-Fi)
- 2011 Drive My Blues Away (Electro-Fi)
- 2007 At Home in Nova Scotia (Deep Cove)
- 2003 Painkiller (Electro-Fi)
- 2003 Hogtown Years (Independent)
- 1999 Blues Medicine (Electro-Fi)
- 1994 Morgan Davis Live (Independent)
- 1990 Morgan Davis (Stony Plain)
- 1982 I'm Ready to Play! (Bullhead)
