= Chris James and Patrick Rynn =

American musical duo

- Born: Chris James: North Carolina, United States; Patrick Rynn: Toledo, Ohio
- Genres: Electric blues Chicago blues
- Occupations: Singers, guitarist, bassist, songwriters
- Years active: 1990–present
- Labels: Earwig Music Company, Vizztone
- Website: chrisjamesandpatrickrynn.com

Chris James and Patrick Rynn are an American electric blues and Chicago blues duo, comprising James on lead guitar and vocals and Rynn on bass guitar and backing vocals. They first met in 1990 in Chicago. Their debut album, Stop and Think About It, was nominated for a 2009 Blues Music Award. "Mister Coffee", a track from the album, was nominated for a Blues Blast Award as Best Blues Song and won third place in the Independent Music Awards. Their 2010 follow-up was Gonna Boogie Anyway. Rynn has been nominated for a Blues Music Award as 'Best Blues Bassist' for seven consecutive years.

== Life and career ==
Chris James' love of the blues was inspired by his stepfather's taste in music. He was able to play blues piano by the age of 11. Chuck Berry was an influence, along with Jay McShann's "Confessin' The Blues," a cover version of which appeared on the duo's debut album. He joined Tomcat Courtney's backing band when he was 13, initially playing the harmonica and later bass and then rhythm guitar. He made his recording debut on Roger Belloni's album The Lemon Grove Tapes. He later joined Detroit Junior's backing ensemble before meeting Patrick Rynn and persuading him to play bass.

Patrick Rynn is from Toledo, Ohio. He was classically trained on bass from an early age and was first introduced to blues at age 16 by Tenor saxophonist Floyd "Candy" Johnson. It was not until two years later after hearing Elmore James' version of "Dust My Broom" that he began to pursue blues. In 1989, Rynn met Junior Wells and after that meeting was invited to Chicago. He moved there in 1990, and shortly after he met Chris James. James and Rynn began a friendship and musical collaboration that has led to an almost 30-year career together. Work in Chicago led them to join Sam Lay's backing band, where they stayed for five years and were part of the recording of Sam Lay Blues Band Live (1996). They later backed Lay on Rhythm Room Blues (2001). In 1994 in Woodland Park, Colorado, they met harmonicist Rob Stone. Stone soon moved to Chicago, joining James and Rynn in Lay's "Chicago Blues Band". James and Rynn later collaborated with Stone to form Rob Stone & the C-Notes, who recorded their debut album, No Worries, in 1998 and then Just My Luck in 2003. Further backing and recording work ensued. Both James and Rynn then were leaders of the band named "The Blue Four", who backed Jody Williams until 2004.

Their 2008 debut album, Stop and Think About It, was nominated for a 2009 Blues Music Award. Gonna Boogie Anyway (2010) saw guest appearances by the pianists David Maxwell and Henry Gray; harmonica players Bob Corritore and Rob Stone, guitarist Jeff Stone, and on two tracks, drummer Sam Lay. The album's track listing included cover versions of songs written by Bo Diddley, Jimmy Reed, and Robert Lockwood, Jr. James and Rynn later played on Rob Stone's album Back Around Here (2010).

Barrelhouse Stomp, which featured pianists Henry Gray, Arron Moore, and David Maxwell, was recorded between 2009 and 2011. James and Rynn separately contributed guest guitar and bass guitar work on Bob Corritore's albums Harmonica Blues (2010), Long Term friends in the Blues (2012), and Knockin' Around These Blues by both John Primer and Corritore (2013). In 2012, James and Rynn performed at the Topanga Canyon Blues Festival.

On Trouble Don't Last (2015) James and Rynn were joined by Rob Stone and Aki Kumar on harmonica, and June Core on drums. It is the duo's first release on Vizztone. It was recorded in a studio in Tempe, Arizona inside two days.

== Discography ==
=== Albums ===
Year	Title	Record label
2008	Stop and Think About It	Earwig Music Company
2010	Gonna Boogie Anyway	Earwig Music Company
2011	Barrelhouse Stomp	Earwig Music Company
2015	Trouble Don't Last	Vizztone

== See also ==
- List of blues musicians
