= Curley Bridges =

American singer-songwriter

- Born: Curley Wilson Bridges; February 7, 1934; Fuquay-Varina, North Carolina, United States
- Died: November 27, 2014 (aged 80) Barrie, Ontario, Canada
- Genres: Electric blues, rock and roll, rhythm and blues
- Occupations: Singer, songwriter, pianist, organist
- Instruments: Vocals, piano, organ
- Years active: 1950s–2014
- Label: Electro-Fi Records

Curley Wilson Bridges (February 7, 1934 – November 27, 2014) was an American electric blues, rock and roll, and rhythm and blues singer, pianist and songwriter.

== Life and career ==
Bridges was born in Fuquay-Varina, North Carolina. His father, Gleason Bridges who befriended Fats Waller, was a farmer and part-time musician, and his mother, Ophelia, played the organ at their church. Bridges saw Joe Turner and Louis Jordan performing in nearby Raleigh, North Carolina, giving him early inspiration, and he sang at church. Following his conscription into the U.S. Army at the age of 19, Bridges heard Albert Ammons, Pete Johnson and Piano Red playing the piano and was determined to master the instrument. After leaving the army on medical grounds, Bridges moved back to Washington, D.C., his home since childhood, and worked as a cook.

Bridges often lingered backstage at the Howard Theatre, where he met and befriended Billie Holiday. In 1953, he and the trumpet player Frank Motley, Jr., formed the Motley Crew. Bridges performed with this group until 1966; he was the lead vocalist and played the piano and, on occasion, the trombone or drums. In 1954, they recorded an upbeat version of the song "Hound Dog", which was renamed "New Hound Dog" and issued by Big Town Records, billed as by Frank "Dual Trumpeter" Motley & His Crew (with vocal by Curley Bridges) (Big Town 116). The track was arranged by Bridges. Several singles followed, including "A Prayer of Love" (1961), "Are You Satisfied" (1964), "Crying All Alone," "Honey Hush," "Tennessee Waltz," "Everybody Wants a Flattop," "Any Other Way," and "Rock and Roll Gotta Beat," which were issued on various American and Canadian record labels. The outfit played across North America over the years, including taking part in a United Service Organizations (USO Show) in 1959. In 1961, Bridges received a royalty check for $62.20, which he claimed to be the only royalty payment he received until the turn of the millennium. The following year Bridges and Motley contributed to Jerry Lee Lewis's album Rockin' with Jerry Lee Lewis.

By 1966, the band had relocated to Toronto. Bridges left the group later that year. He recruited King Herbert and Frank Pelly from his former band, and they performed as the Rounders in Northern Ontario.

In 1968, Bridges played the electric organ on the album Jackie Shane Live! Bridges then fronted another band, Bridge Crossing, which collaborated with Frank Motley to record Chip Dip (1972). He continued to perform before and after moving to Barrie, Central Ontario, in 1981. He and other local musicians spent time as the house band at the Ruanne's nightclub in Barrie, led by Gerry Markman, and Bridges performed as a solo act and with the Fig Leaf Jazz Band.

He appeared in 1997 at Toronto's Harbourfront Soul 'n' Blues Festival. In 1999, Bridges recorded his first solo album for the Electro-Fi Records label, Keys to the Blues. It contained his cover versions of songs such as "Honey Hush", "Reconsider Baby", "I'm Tore Down", "Rock Me Baby", "Thank You Pretty Baby", "Every Day I Have the Blues" and "Since I Met You Baby". His second album, Mr. Rock N Soul, was released in October 2001, and included Bridges version of Fats Domino's "My Girl Josephine". Pat Carey played saxophone on the album. Curley Bridges Live at the Silver Dollar Room was issued in 2009 to celebrate his 75th birthday.

In August 2005, Bridges performed at the Edmonton's Labatt Blues Festival.

In 2011, he won the Excellence in the Arts Award at the Barrie Arts Awards. Bridges performed to a sell-out crowd in March 2014, to celebrate his 80th birthday.

Bridges died in the Hospice Simcoe in Barrie, from cancer on November 27, 2014, aged 80. His remains were donated to the University of Toronto for medical research.

== Solo discography ==
=== Albums ===
Year	Title	Record label
1999	Keys to the Blues	Electro-Fi Records
2001	Mr. Rock N Soul	Electro-Fi Records
2009	Curley Bridges Live at the Silver Dollar Room	Electro-Fi Records
2010	Electro-Fi Records Presents Blues Piano-Rama	Electro-Fi Records
