= Enrico Crivellaro =

Italian blues musician

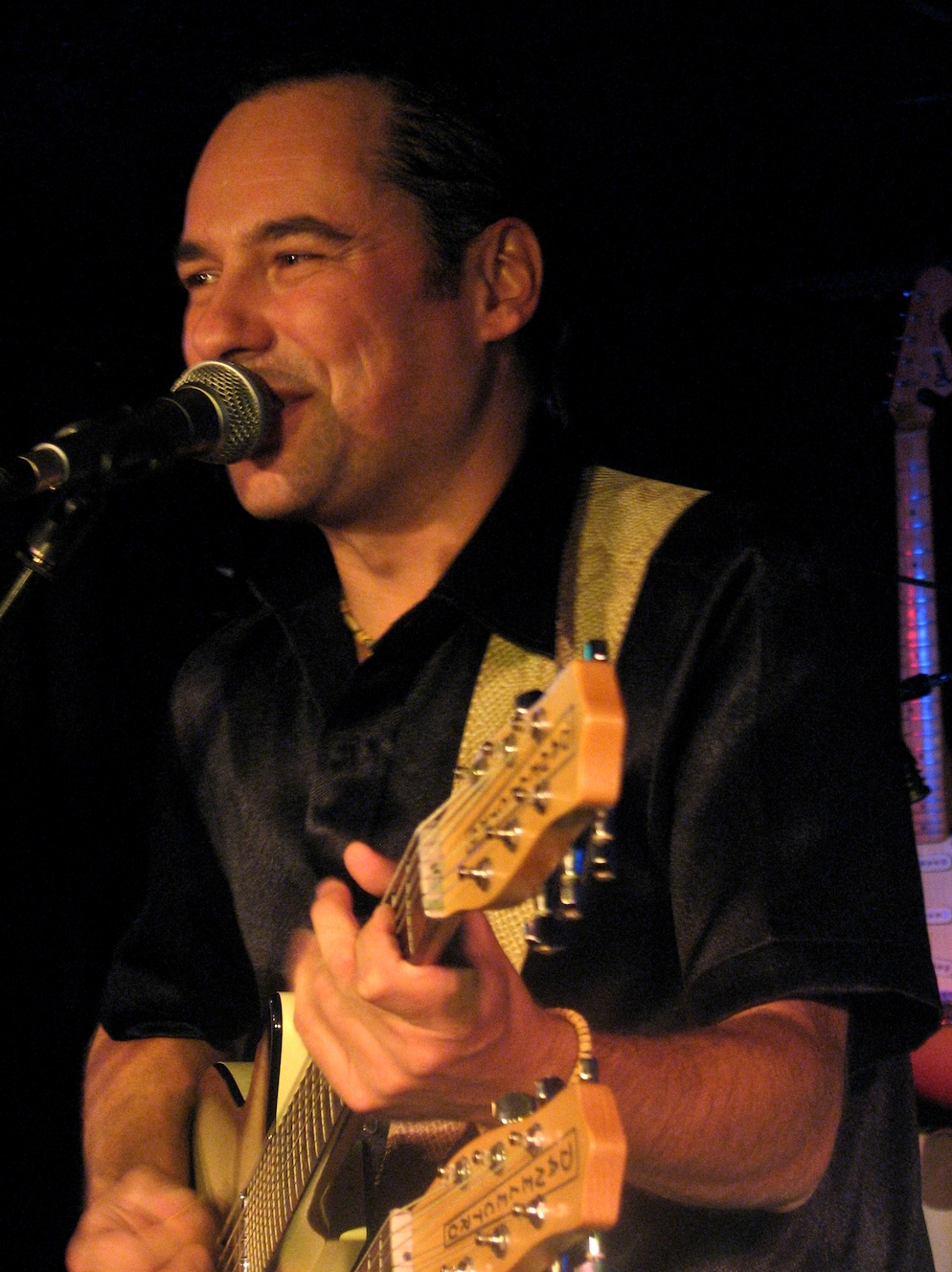
- Enrico Crivellaro at the NiX BBBlues Club

Background information
- Born: Padua, Italy
- Genres: Blues
- Occupation: Musician
- Instrument: Guitar
- Years active: 1997–present
- Labels: Electro-Fi
- Website: www.enricocrivellaro.com

Enrico Crivellaro (born in Padua, Italy) is an Italian blues musician.

== Awards ==
- "Best Swing Guitarist – International" (2002), Swing Awards (USA)
- "Best Italian Blues Guitarist" (2003), Blues and Blues awards (Italy)
- "Best Contemporary Blues Guitarist – International" (2004), Thropees France Blues (France)

== Discography ==
Year	Album	Band	Label
1997	Down At The Juke	Jason Ricci Band	North Magnolia Music Company; Oxford, Mississippi
1998	Takin’ Chances	James Harman Band	Cannonball Records; Chanhassen, Minnesota
1999	My Bad Luck Soul	Janiva Magness Band	Blues Leaf Records; Deal, New Jersey
2000	“Friday Night Blues Revue” Friday Night Live	KPCC 89.3 FM	Pacific Blues Recording Company; Burbank, California
2001	Passport to Australia	Royal Crown Revue	RCR Records; Los Angeles, California
2002	So Lowdown Tour 2002	Lester Butler Tribute Band	CRS; Wageningen, Netherlands
2003	Lonesome Moon Trance	James Harman Band	Pacific Blues Records; Los Angeles, California
2003	Blues Ignited	David Rotundo	Stone Pillar Productions; Toronto, Ontario, Canada
2003	Key To My Kingdom	Enrico Crivellaro	Electro-Fi Records; Toronto, Ontario, Canada,
2005	What My Blues Are All About	Finis Tasby	Electro-Fi Records; Toronto, Ontario, Canada
2006	Mosquito Bite	Enrico Crivellaro & Raphael Wressnig Organ Trio	ZYX Music/Koch Entertainment; Merenberg, Germany
2009	Live At The Off Festival (DVD/CD)	Enrico Crivellaro & Raphael Wressnig Organ Combo	ZZYX Music/Koch Entertainment; Merenberg, Germany
2009	Mojo Zone	Enrico Crivellaro & Band	Electro-Fi Records; Toronto, Ontario, Canada
