= Camille Bloom =

American singer-songwriter

Camille Bloom (born November 2, 1975) is an internationally touring American musician & singer / songwriter, endorsed by Gibson Guitars. Since 2003 she has released four studio albums, the last of which, Never Out Of Time, was released in November 2011. She is now a music teacher and still continues to sing her heart out at school events.

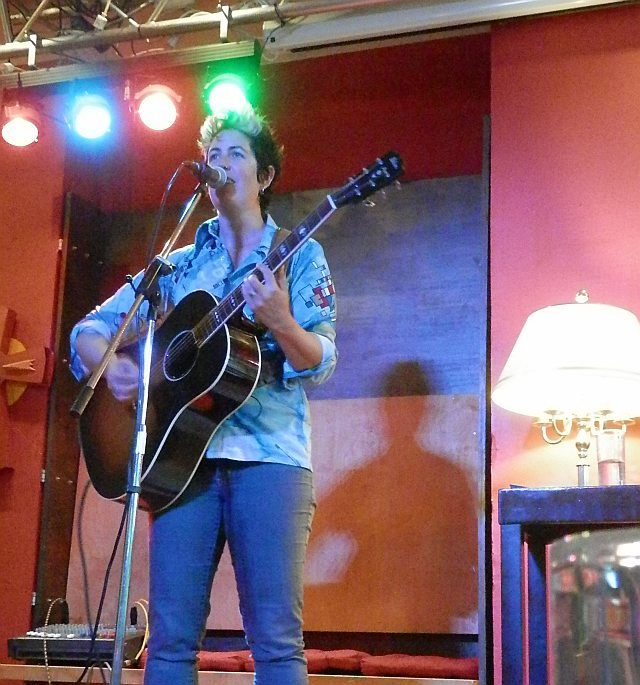
Camille Bloom

== Personal life ==
Camille Bloom was born in Bremerton, Washington. Today she is based in Luxembourg, Luxembourg. Camille spent the first ten years of her childhood in Lake Chelan before moving to Spokane, Washington in 1985. She was an athlete growing up, and was selected for the Eastern Washington All Star Team in Basketball. After graduating Eastern Washington University in Secondary English Education, Camille re-located to Seattle where she taught high school for 5 years, as well as coached the Head Girls' Basketball team. After several years of playing music on the side while teaching, Camille transitioned into becoming a full-time musician. She has since toured 9 countries, released 4 full-length recordings and several EPs – and performed with artists such as Smashmouth, Metric, Sugarcult, Mark Olson, Shawn Mullins, The Weepies, Mike McCready.

== Career ==
Camille Bloom published her first Solo studio album Within Me in 2003. The physical CD was sold out by 2005 – but is still available for download. It is a guitar and percussion based album which includes calm and thought provoking songs (like Jimmy or Heart Loses Balance) but also faster (Painted On Smile) or rhythmic changing (Damage) songs.

In 2004 she published an EP, Stripped Down – which was a 5-song acoustic album that had several licensing placements in indie films.

Her second full album, Say Goodbye To Pretty, was released in 2006. It was produced by Paul Kimble (Radiohead, David Gray, Grant Lee Buffalo). This album received great reviews and airplay in the Northwest. The title song, Pretty, deals with pressures to conform to societal standards of beauty. Camille decided to forge her own identity and "say goodbye to pretty" rather than trying to be the "perfect" musician.

The third album, Ten Thousand Miles, was recorded and released in 2008. In contrast to the first albums it was recorded Live in one session as an album and live DVD in the Columbia City Theatre in Seattle. The songs feature her full band – The Recovery – and a new instrumental addition of a cellist. This album also received great reviews and radio play.

In 2010 she won the "best Indie Singer-Songwriter at Ladylake Music Awards 2010". She also had songs licensed for use in over 21 shows on Major Networks stations.

Her second EP, Sneak, was published in early 2011. Camille used this album to convey acoustic versions of her latest material as a sneak peek at the upcoming full band album. She used the money from the selling of this EP to help cover recording costs.

Never Out Of Time is the latest album and was released on Tuesday, November 8, 2011. It was realized due to the contributions of her fans, who helped her to raise nearly Fifteen thousand dollars through contributions and pre-sales. The album ranges from pop, to rock, to folk – and even makes a foray into hip hop with a bonus track called Teeny Car. It was produced by Martin Feveyear who is known for his work with the likes of R.E.M., Rosie Thomas, Brandi Carlile, Presidents of the United States, and many more. Like the previous full-length albums, it was recorded with her band The Recovery, at this time with these musicians:

- Camille Bloom: lead vocals and acoustic guitar
- Michael Cotta: Drums and percussion
- Jim Watkins: Bass
- Danny Godinez: Lead guitar
- Jessika Kitzmann: Cello
- Gaelen Billingsley: Back up Vocals

== Discography ==
Albums

- Your Only Warning EP (2001)
- Within Me (2003)
- Stripped Down EP (2004)
- Say Goodbye To Pretty (2006)
- Ten Thousand Miles Album and DVD (2008)
- Sneak EP (2011)
- Never Out Of Time (2011)
- Big dreams (2015)
- Pieces Of Me (2016)
