= Rusty Zinn =

American singer-songwriter

- Born: April 3, 1970 (age 55); Long Beach, California, United States
- Genres: Electric blues, reggae
- Occupation(s): Guitarist, singer-songwriter
- Instrument(s): Guitar, vocals
- Years active: 1980s–present
- Labels: Black Top, Alligator, Bad Daddy Records, 9 Above Records
- Website: www.rustyreggae.com

Rusty Zinn (born April 3, 1970 in Long Beach, California, United States) is an American electric blues and reggae guitarist and singer-songwriter. Zinn released six albums between 1996 and 2009, on Black Top, Alligator, Bad Daddy, and 9 Above Records. He has worked with Mark Hummel, Kim Wilson, Larry Taylor, and Sly Dunbar.

== Biography ==
Zinn was raised in Northern California, and was introduced to music via both his mother's and brother's record collections. He bought blues recordings himself, intrigued by guitar players such as Robert Lockwood, Jr., Eddie Taylor, and Jimmy Rogers. Having practised the drums as a youngster, Zinn purchased his first guitar at the age of seventeen, and then witnessed Luther Tucker perform in concert with Rogers. Within twelve months, Tucker invited Zinn onstage and gave him some guitar playing advice. By the late 1980s, Zinn was playing in several Bay Area bands, and had backed both Rogers and Snooky Pryor.

A spell in Mark Hummel's backing band The Blues Survivors followed, and he later met Kim Wilson at the 1992 San Francisco Blues Festival. Subsequently, Zinn joined Wilson's band, alongside the former Canned Heat bassist, Larry Taylor, and played on Wilson's 1993 album Tigerman. He also toured, and played on Wilson's 1994 effort, That's Life.

In 1996, Zinn released his solo debut album, Sittin' & Waitin' , on Black Top Records, which saw Wilson act as both accompanist and record producer. It earned Zinn a Blues Music Award nomination as 'Best New Blues Artist'. Confessin' was issued by Zinn in 1999, and then The Chill (2000), featuring Elvin Bishop on slide guitar. Zinn's more recent issues included Zinfidelity, Vol. 1 (2005) and Reggaeblue (2007). The latter fused blues, reggae and soul stylings.

In 2009, Zinn released Manifestation, which was recorded in Jamaica, and included contributions from Sly Dunbar, Robbie Lynn, Boris Gardiner and Scully Simms.

== Discography ==
Album title	Record label	Year of release
Sitting' & Waiting'	Black Top Records	1996
Confessin'	Black Top Records	1999
The Chill	Alligator Records	2000
Zinfidelity, Vol. 1	Bad Daddy Records	2005
Reggaeblue	Bad Daddy Records	2007
Manifestation	9 Above Records	2009
The Reggae Soul of Rusty Zinn	RockBeat Records	2015
