= Johnny Dyer =

American blues musician and singer (1938–2014)

- Born: December 7, 1938; Rolling Fork, Mississippi, United States
- Died: November 11, 2014 (aged 75) San Dimas, California, United States
- Genres: Electric blues
- Occupations: Harmonicist, singer, songwriter
- Instruments: Harmonica, vocals
- Years active: 1950s–2014

Johnny Dyer (December 7, 1938 – November 11, 2014) was an American electric blues harmonicist and singer. He made numerous recordings, both as a solo performer and with other musicians. He was nominated for a Blues Music Award,

== Biography ==
Dyer grew up in Rolling Fork, Mississippi, and learned to play the harmonica from the age of seven. His initial inspiration came from hearing Little Walter on radio station from Nashville, Tennessee, and by his teenage years he was playing acoustic harmonica and had formed his own band. He started playing amplified harmonica in the early 1950s, when he first performed alongside Smokey Wilson.

Dyer relocated to Los Angeles, California, in January 1958, where he met George "Harmonica" Smith. Together they played concerts with a "father and son" billing. Dyer commented on that time stating, "Smith was the hottest thing around and the blues was really swinging! He taught me a lot. Everybody loved George." Following this Dyer set up his own combo, Johnny Dyer and the Blue Notes, and played with Jimmy Reed, J. B. Hutto, and Jimmy Rogers.

Dyer left the music industry in the 1960s. Resurfacing in the 1980s, he found work with other harmonica players, such as Shakey Jake Harris, Harmonica Fats, and Rod Piazza. Dyer released a couple of singles, including "Overdose of Love" and, in 1983, issued the album Johnny Dyer and the LA Jukes album. The Dutch record label Black Magic featured Dyer on the album Hard Times: L.A. Blues Anthology compilation album.

Dyer later collaborated with the guitarist Rick Holmstrom, and together they issued two albums for Black Top Records: Listen Up (1994) and Shake It! (1995). Listen Up included Dyer's cover version of the blues standard "Driftin' Blues". The album, Jukin', released in 1996, was a reissue of Dyer's debut LP with additional tracks. It contained Dyer's version of "Baby What You Want Me to Do".

He appeared on the bill at the Long Beach Blues Festival in 2000, where he sang alongside James Cotton. Over the years he was a featured performer on Mark Hummel's annual Blues Harmonica Blowout tours.

Dyer received a Blues Music Award nomination in 2004, in the 'Blues Song Of The Year' category, for the track "Hard Times Won." He has also spent time playing with The Mannish Boys, and has appeared on a number of their album releases.

His final album was Rolling Fork Revisited (2004), recorded with Mark Hummel. The album contained reworkings of songs by another Rolling Fork native, Muddy Waters.

Dyer died at home in San Dimas, California, on November 11, 2014, at the age of 75.

== Discography ==
=== Albums ===
Album title	Record label	Year of release
Johnny Dyer and the LA Dukes	Murray Brothers	1983
Listen Up	Black Top Records	1994
Shake It!	Black Top Records	1995
Jukin'	Blind Pig Records	1996
Rolling Fork Revisited	Mountain Top Productions	2004

== See also ==
- List of electric blues musicians
- List of harmonica blues musicians
