= Gary Primich =

American songwriter

Background information
- Born: Gary Alan Primich; April 20, 1958; Chicago, Illinois, United States
- Died: September 23, 2007 (aged 49); Austin, Texas, United States
- Genres: Electric blues, contemporary blues
- Occupations: Harmonicist, singer, guitarist, songwriter
- Instruments: Vocals, harmonica, guitar
- Years active: Mid 1980s–2007
- Label: Various

Gary Primich (April 20, 1958 – September 23, 2007) was an American blues harmonica player, singer, guitarist and songwriter. He is best known for his 1995 album, Mr. Freeze.

== Biography ==
Gary Alan Primich was born in Chicago, Illinois, but grew up in nearby Hobart, Indiana, where he attended Hobart High School. In 1984, after he graduated with a Bachelor's degree from Indiana University, Primich relocated to Austin, Texas.

While working at the University of Texas, he started playing along with other musicians in local clubs. In 1987, he met Jimmy Carl Black, and they formed the Mannish Boys. Their debut album, A L'il Dab'll Do Ya was issued on the Amazing Records label, and although Black then left the band, Primich stayed with the Mannish Boys for another album, Satellite Rock. In 1991 Primich released his eponymous solo debut album, and My Pleasure followed the next year. Amazing Records then folded, and Primich was contracted to the Flying Fish Records label releasing Travelin' Mood (1994) and Mr. Freeze (1995). Mr. Freeze was named as one of the 20 best blues albums of the 1990s by the Chicago newspaper, Newcity.

Constant touring allowed Primich to expand his fan base, and by 2000, he had a recording contract with the Texas Music Group. He issued Dog House Music (2002) and then Ridin' the Darkhorse (2006). Primich also recorded with Steve James, Omar & the Howlers, John "Juke" Logan, Marcia Ball, Ruthie Foster, Mike Morgan and the Crawl, Nick Curran, Doyle Bramhall and Jimmie Vaughan.

In addition to his performance albums, in 1985 Primich released an instructional double CD, Blues Harmonica: The Blues And Beyond. In June 1999, at the Montgomery Theater in San Jose, California, Primich undertook a performance and series of workshops with Howard Levy, Magic Dick, Gary Smith, Lee Oskar, Jerry Portnoy, and Andy Santana. He was inducted in the Austin Music Hall of Fame.

In September 2007, Primich died at his home in Austin, at the age of 49, of acute heroin intoxication. In 2015 the Killer Blues Project placed a headstone for Gary Primich at Restvale Cemetery in Alsip, Illinois.

== Discography ==
- Gary Primich (1991, Amazing)
- My Pleasure (1992, Amazing)
- Hot Harp Blues (1993, Amazing)
- Travelin' Mood (1994, Flying Fish)
- Mr. Freeze (1995, Flying Fish)
- Company Man (1997, Black Top)
- Botheration (1999, Black Top)
- Dog House Music (2002, Antone's/Texas Music Group)
- Ridin' the Darkhorse (2006, Electro-Fi)
- Just a Little Bit More (2012, Old Pal Records) - with Omar Dykes

== See also ==
- List of electric blues musicians
- List of harmonicists
