= Kid Ramos =

American songwriter

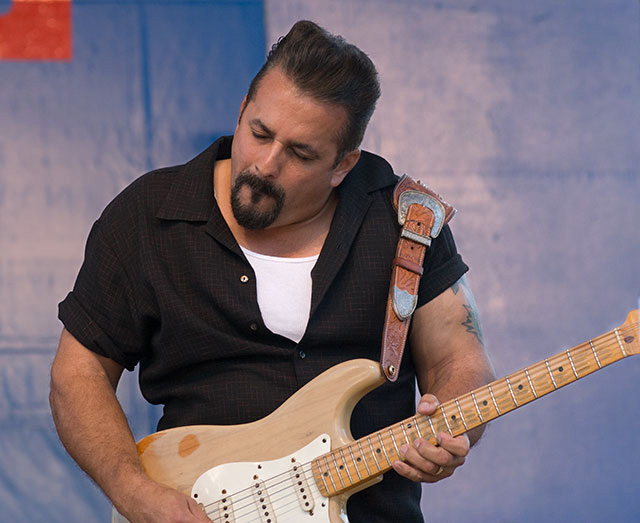
- Kid Ramos performing at the 2008 San Francisco Blues Festival.

Background information
- Born: David Ramos; January 13, 1959 (age 67); Fullerton, California, United States
- Genres: Electric blues, blues rock
- Occupations: Guitarist, singer, songwriter
- Instruments: Guitar, vocals
- Years active: 1980–present
- Labels: Black Top, Evidence

Kid Ramos (born January 13, 1959) is an American electric blues and blues rock guitarist, singer and songwriter. Ramos has released four solo albums since 1995 on Black Top and Evidence Records. He has worked with James Harman, Roomful of Blues, the Big Rhythm Combo, The Fabulous Thunderbirds, The Mannish Boys, Bobby Jones and Los Fabulocos.

== Life and career ==
David Ramos was born in Fullerton, California, United States, with both of his parents being professional opera singers. After playing at the parties of friends and at local nightclubs in his teenage years, he turned fully professional when joining James Harman's band in 1980. He stayed playing his guitar for Harman until 1988, when he briefly helped out with Roomful of Blues. However, at this point, Ramos took a break from music to raise a family, and worked as a water delivery man.

In 1994, Ramos joined forces with Lynwood Slim to form the Big Rhythm Combo. Ramos' debut solo album, Two Hands One Heart, was released the following year. Ramos had joined The Fabulous Thunderbirds in 1993, following an invitation from their singer, Kim Wilson. As well as regularly recording and appearing with them up to 2002, Ramos also continued to release his own albums, with Greasy Kid Stuff (2001) being his most recent.

Ramos appeared at the 2005 Edmonton's Labatt Blues Festival, playing along with the Mannish Boys. He also formed the roots quartet, Los Fabulocos, who released their debut album in 2008. In 2009, Ramos backed Bobby Jones at the Notodden Blues Festival.

In August 2012, Ramos was diagnosed with Ewing's sarcoma, a rare form of cancer, and underwent chemotherapy treatment the following month. He was expected to require radiotherapy, surgery and further chemotherapy during the course of the next twelve months. A medical appeal was launched to assist with the costs of his treatment. Kid Ramos received the Orange County Music Awards Lifetime Achievement Award on March 7, 2014. At the event he announced that he had completed his treatment and recovered from the cancer.

== Discography ==
| Year | Title | Record label |
|---|---|---|
| 1995 | Two Hands One Heart | Black Top |
| 1999 | Kid Ramos | Evidence |
| 2000 | West Coast House Party | Evidence |
| 2001 | Greasy Kid Stuff | Evidence |
| 2018 | Old School | Rip Cat |
| 2025 | Strange Things Happening | Nola Blue |
