= Mickey Champion =

American blues singer (1925–2014)

- Also known as: Miss Mickey Champion
- Born: Mildred Sallier; April 9, 1925; Lake Charles, Louisiana, US
- Died: November 24, 2014 (aged 89) Los Angeles, California
- Genres: Blues, R&B
- Occupations: Singer
- Instruments: Vocals
- Years active: 1950s–2014
- Labels: RPM Records; Aladdin Records; Tondef Records

Mickey Champion (born Mildred Sallier April 9, 1925 – November 24, 2014) was an American blues singer. With a career spanning over five decades, she is best remembered for her powerful vocals, and for guesting alongside other prominent musical acts.

== Biography ==
Champion was born in Lake Charles, Louisiana. She was raised by her aunts and had her first experience as a singer at Lake Charles Christian Methodist Episcopal Church, where her grandfather was a bishop. Admired for the quality and intensity of her religious singing, she became part of a vocal trio, and while in high school was heard and praised by bandleader Louis Jordan. However, Champion, upon her family's insistence, was required to turn down an offer by Jordan to join his troupe. Shortly after graduating from high school, Champion married her first husband, Norman Champion, and in 1945, the couple moved to Los Angeles. Originally working as Little Mickey Champion, she soon led an active career in the cities bustling nightclub scene.

The marriage between Mickey and Norman Champion was brief and soon ended in divorce. As her notoriety for her powerful vocalizing without the use of any microphones grew, Champion expanded her performing outside Los Angeles alongside other musical acts such as T-Bone Walker, Little Esther Phillips, Billie Holiday, Duke Ellington, Ray Charles, and Jackie Wilson in the late 1940s and early 1950s. Among her collaborators was Roy Milton, who Champion married, recorded several sides with in the mid-1950s, and stayed with until Milton's death in 1983. In addition, Champion recorded four singles, along with several demos.

In the 1960s, Champion withdrew from touring to focus on her family, but still performed in nightclubs on weekends. After a long hiatus, she returned to recording, producing two albums I am Your Loving Legend! and What You Want both on Tondef Records.

== Death ==
Champion suffered several strokes before dying on November 24, 2014, in Los Angeles.

== Discography ==
- 1999 I'm Your Living Legend (Tondef)
- 1999 Live at the Living Room (R&M Sound)
- 2002 What You Want (Tondef)
