= Kenny "Blues Boss" Wayne =

American songwriter (born 1944)

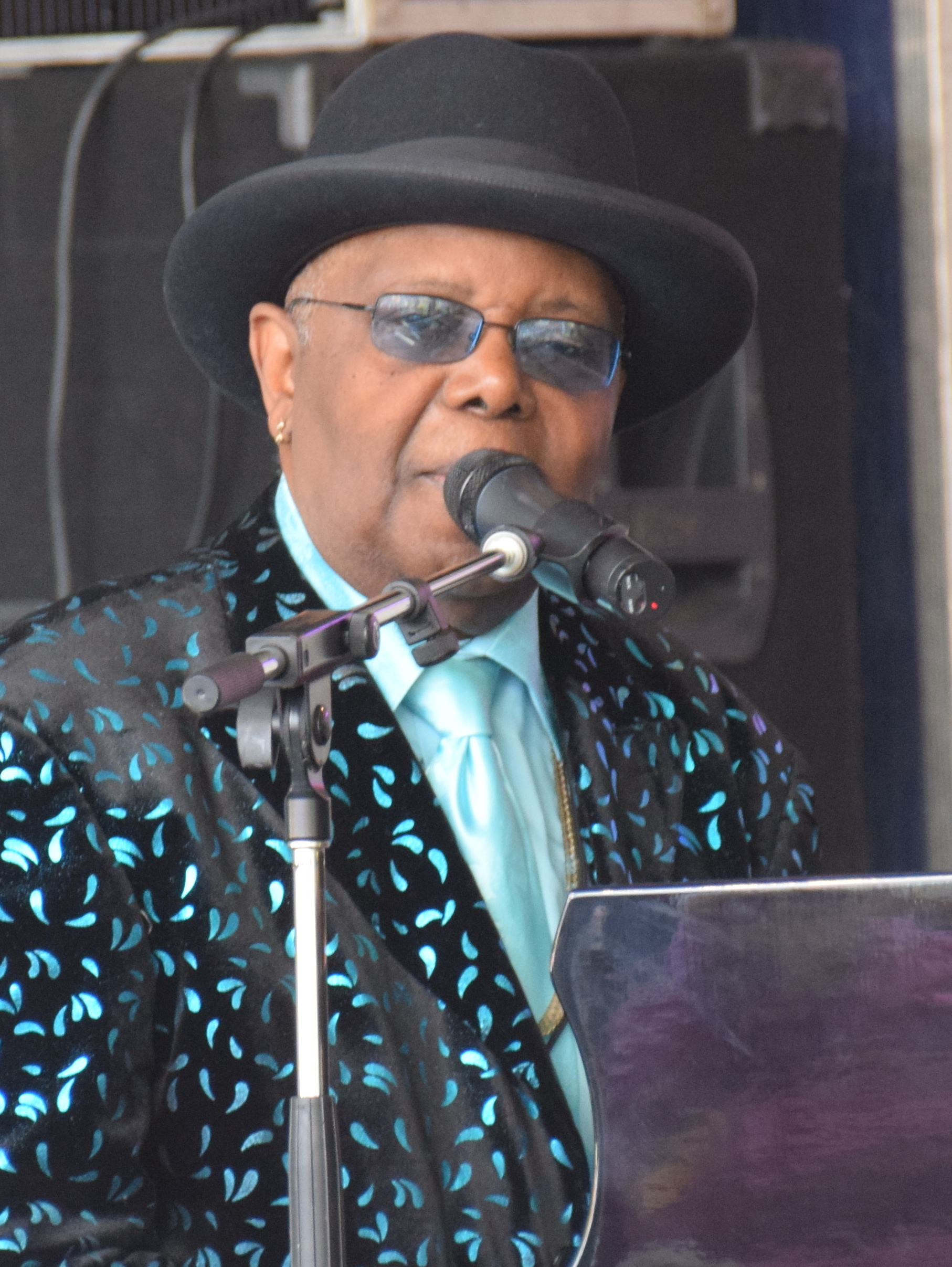
- Wayne at the Richmond Folk Festival in 2018

Background information
- Born: Kenneth Wayne Spruell; November 13, 1944 (age 81); Spokane, Washington, United States
- Genres: Blues, boogie-woogie, jazz
- Occupations: Pianist, singer, songwriter
- Instruments: Piano, vocals
- Years active: 1962–present
- Label: Various
- Website: Official website

Kenny "Blues Boss" Wayne (born Kenneth Wayne Spruell, November 13, 1944) is an American blues, boogie-woogie and jazz pianist, singer and songwriter. Music journalist, Jeff Johnson, writing in the Chicago Sun-Times stated, "There's no boogie-woogie-blues piano man out there today who pounds the 88's with the conviction of Kenny "Blues Boss" Wayne."

== Biography ==
Wayne was born in 1944 in Spokane, Washington, but he relocated with his family to San Francisco, California at an early age. His parents alternatively advised for and against the blues, but his mother's influence led Wayne to be influenced early by Nat King Cole, Little Willie John, and Fats Domino. The family moved in turn to New Orleans, Los Angeles and Compton, California. While he was growing up, Wayne drew further inspiration from The Three Sounds, George Shearing, Erroll Garner, Cal Tjader, Mongo Santamaría, Ray Charles, Charles Brown, Floyd Dixon, Big Joe Turner, and Jimmy Reed.

Based in Los Angeles during the 1960s and 1970s, Wayne was utilised as a sideman by various pop and rock musicians. In the 1980s Wayne relocated again to Vancouver, British Columbia. "Blues Boss" (his nickname was acquired from the title of Amos Milburn's comeback album with Motown Records) undertook a tour of Europe in 1994. Wayne dedicated his debut album to his parents, and 2002 heralded the issue of 88th & Jump Street, followed by Blues Carry Me Home (2003) and Let It Loose (2005).

His festival appearances have included Edmonton's Labatt Blues Festival (2004), Koktebel Jazz Festival (2006), Southside Shuffle in Port Credit, Ontario (2015), and the Montreal Jazz Festival (2023).

In May 2008, Wayne issued his album, Can't Stop Now. Wayne's release, Rollin' with the Blues Boss (2014), included guest contributions from Diunna Greenleaf and Eric Bibb. Wayne's 2016 release, Jumpin' & Boppin' featured guitarist Duke Robillard.

== Juno Awards ==
Nominated in 1997 for 'Best Blues/Gospel Album,' and in 1999 and 2003 for 'Best Blues Album,' Wayne was presented with a Juno Award in 2006 for Let It Loose.

== Discography ==
=== Solo ===
- Alive & Lose (1995) - Blue Roots
- Blues Boss Boogie (1998) - Real Blues
- 88th & Jump Street (2002) - Electro-Fi
- Blues Carry Me Home (2002) - Isabel
- Let It Loose (2005) - Electro Fi
- Can't Stop Now (2008) - Electro-Fi
- An Old Rock on a Roll (2011) - Stony Plain
- Rollin' with the Blues Boss (2014) - Stony Plain
- Jumpin' & Boppin' (2016) - Stony Plain
- Inspired By The Blues (2018) - Stony Plain
- Go, Just Do It! (2020) - Stony Plain

=== Compilations ===
- Electro-Fi records presents Piano-Rama (2010) - Electro-Fi
- Big City Back Country Blues (2017) - Brandon Isaak Music

=== Compilation inclusions ===
- Saturday Night Blues: 20 Years (2006) - CBC

== See also ==
- List of boogie woogie musicians
- List of people from Spokane, Washington
