= Fruteland Jackson =

American singer

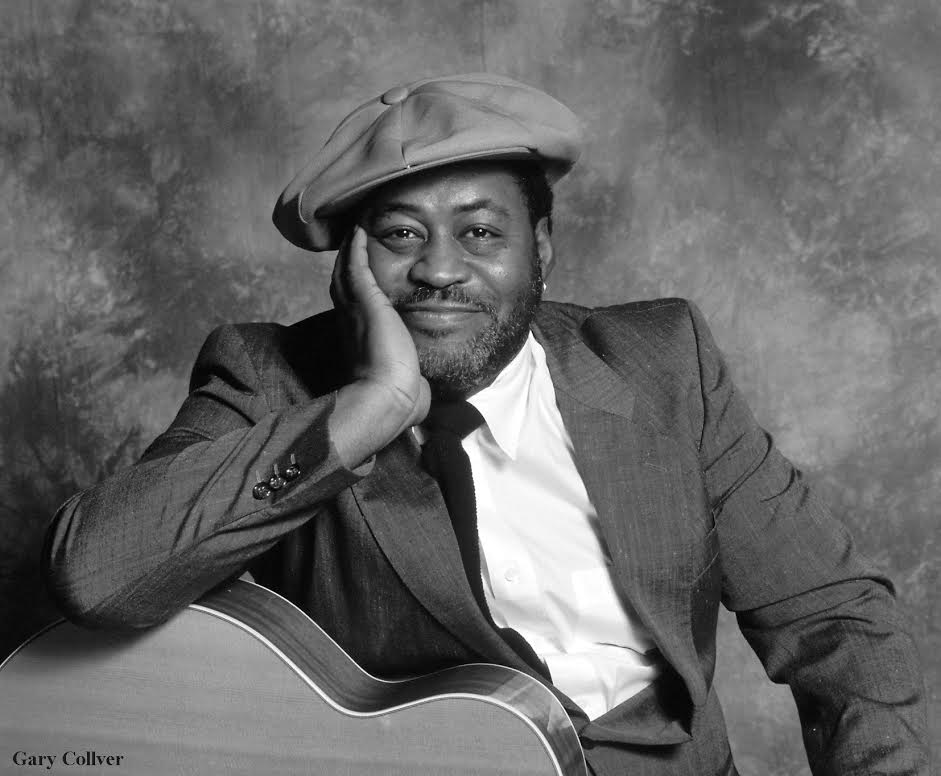

Background information
- Born: June 9, 1953 (age 72); Doddsville, Mississippi, United States
- Genres: Electric blues, blues
- Occupation(s): Guitarist, singer, songwriter, educator
- Instrument(s): Guitar, vocals
- Years active: Mid 1980s–present
- Labels: Electro-Fi Records
- Website: http://www.fruteland.com/

Fruteland Jackson (born June 9, 1953) is an American electric blues guitarist, singer and songwriter. Henry Townsend stated, "My respect for Fruteland Jackson is very high. He and my boy Alvin Youngblood Hart is the future sound of true acoustic blues." He has also worked with children to raise awareness of blues music and has been honored for his work in that field, including in 1997 being granted a W. C. Handy Award for "Keeping the Blues Alive" in Education.

Since 2000, Jackson has released three albums.

== Life and career ==
Jackson was born in Doddsville, Mississippi, the son of an insurance underwriter, and he relocated with his family to Chicago in the 1960s to secure better employment and education outlooks. His father was employed by North Carolina Mutual Insurance Company, and his mother worked as a nurse at Chicago's Cook County Hospital. He received his first guitar from his uncle when aged 12, and played in high school band before receiving further education at Roosevelt University. Jackson got married and worked as a private investigator then for the Illinois Department of Human Rights. By the mid 1980s, Jackson had relocated to Biloxi, Mississippi. His wholesale seafood business, Camel Seafood Company, was destroyed by Hurricane Elena, and Jackson immersed himself in blues music, inspired by the work of William R. Ferris. He learned the music of Johnny Shines, Howlin' Wolf, Muddy Waters and the earlier Robert Johnson songs, with the view of working as an educator, activist and musician.

Jackson appeared at the Chicago Blues Festival and Boundary Waters Blues Festival, as well as working in schools across the United States. He perfected two presentation styles to educate children about blues music, and he was known as Mr. Fruteland by those who he taught. Jackson worked with the Blues Foundation to create a teaching program called "All About the Blues". In 1996 the Illinois Arts Council granted him their Folk/Ethnic Heritage Award. The Blues Foundation followed by naming Jackson as a recipient of their 'Keeping the Blues Alive Award.

In 1999, he published the educational book, Guitar Roots: Delta Blues – The roots of great guitar playing. He has also penned a one-act play entitled, The Life and Times of Robert Johnson.

Also in 1999, Jackson was signed to a recording contract by Electro-Fi Records. I Claim Nothing But the Blues (2000), was followed by Blues 2.0 (2003). The latter was nominated for a W. C. Handy Award, and the magazine, Blues Revue named it "one of the finest blues albums of this young decade." Tell Me What You Say was Jackson's next album release in 2006. The latest recording from Jackson was Good As Your Last Dollar (2019).

He remains based in Chicago.

== Discography ==
Year	Title	Record label
2000	I Claim Nothing But the Blues	Electro-Fi Records
2003	Blues 2.0	Electro-Fi Records
2006	Tell Me What You Say	Electro-Fi Records
2019	Good As Your Last Dollar	Electro-Fi Records

== See also ==
- List of electric blues musicians
- List of blues musicians
