= Finis Tasby =

American singer

- Born: February 1, 1939; Nevada, Texas, United States
- Died: November 2, 2014 (aged 75)
- Genres: Blues
- Instrument(s): Vocals, bass guitar, drums
- Years active: Late 1950s–2012

Finis Tasby (February 1, 1939 – November 2, 2014) was a Los Angeles based blues singer and frontman for the group The Mannish Boys.

== Background and career ==
There is some confusion over his birth details, depending on which source is referenced. One year quoted is 1939, and that he was born on February 1, in Dallas Texas United States. Another states that he was born in 1940 in Dallas, Texas.

=== Early years: 1950s and 1960s ===
While in his teens, he played drums for a local band called The Blues Blasters. In the early 1960s he had moved over to bass guitar. He became a member of a local group called The Thunderbirds, playing bass as well as contributing backup vocals. Later he would work with Z.Z. Hill, Clarence Carter and Lowell Fulson. He also worked with Freddie King when he toured in the region.

=== 1970s onwards ===
In 1971, he was in Beaumont, Texas, working with Joe Simon and Z.Z. Hill. In 1973, he moved to Los Angeles and worked the blues clubs there. He started a group in LA and opened for artists including B.B. King and Percy Mayfield. In 1981, he appeared in the Burt Reynolds film Sharkeys Machine, where he performed the song "After Hours". In the late 1990s, Tasby began an association with Rand Chortkoff who produced his album, Jump Children. That association would lead to Tasby being the front man for The Mannish Boys which was creation of Chortkoff. The Mannish Boys were nominated numerous times for blues awards. The group's album Double Dynamite received the Traditional blues album of the year award. In 2005, he appeared at the Topanga Canyon Blues Festival in Topanga, California. In 2006, he came to Australia and appeared with guitarist Enrico Crivellaro at the Australian Blues Music Festival.

During his career he worked as an automobile mechanic at various stages. He suffered an injury to his hand in the late 1970s which caused him to give up playing bass, for a time. He did return to playing bass on occasion in the early & mid 2000's at several Southern California clubs such as Martini Blues.

In December 2012, he suffered a stroke. Tasby died in November 2014 as a result, aged 75.

== Recordings ==
Among the singles he recorded in were "Get Drunk and Be Somebody" which was released in 1978, and "Blues Mechanic" which was released on Ace Records. In 1995 he released his debut album, People Don't Care, which was not a commercial success. The album had legs, and potential with the movie "The Babysitter" using 4 songs off the album in that movie starring Alicia Silverstone. And a CD release party at the Hollywood House of Blues as well as a featured night at Universal City Walk's BB Kings Club. The album had guest artists including Lowell Fulson, Mick Taylor, Elvin Bishop and Vernon Reed. In 1998 he released Jump Children. This album did better and had guitarists Kid Ramos and Rick Holmstrom, bassist Larry Taylor and drummer Richard Innes. In 2005 he released What My Blues are All About.

== Discography ==
=== Singles ===
- "Get Drunk and Be Somebody" / "Just a Kiss" – Big Town 724 (1978)
- "Find Something Else To Do" / "To Many People (In The Street)" – Watts City Records – WC1014 (1987)

=== Albums ===
==== 33rpm LPs ====
- Blues Mechanic – Ace Records Ltd. – Ch 122 (1984)

==== Cassettes ====
- People Don't Care – Shanachie Records 9007 (1995)
- A Tribute to John Lee Hooker – Kon-Kord Records 6617 (2002)

==== Compact discs ====
- People Don't Care – Shanachie Records SHCD 9007 (1995)
- Jump Children! – Evidence ECD 26097 – (1998)
- A Tribute to John Lee Hooker – Kon-Kord Records 6617 (2002)
- What My Blues are All About – Electro-Fi Records 3390 (2005)

==== Collaborations ====
- Ruff Kutt Blues Band – That's When The Blues Begins; featuring Zac Harmon, Finis Tasby and Anson Funderburgh – Vizztone VTRK 2013 – (2013), CD Baby / Ruff Kutt 5638083035 – (2013)
