= List of electric blues musicians =

The following is a list of electric blues musicians. The electric blues is a type of blues music distinguished by the amplification of the guitar, the bass guitar, and/or the harmonica and other instruments. Electric blues is performed in several regional subgenres, such as Chicago blues, Texas blues, Delta blues and Memphis blues. Most interpretations of electric blues have a solemn tone through the common uses of the minor pentatonic scale, slow backing, and extended soloing periods, that extend through all subgenres.

== A ==
- C. C. Adcock – Born 1971 in Lafayette, Louisiana, Adcock combines zydeco and electric blues music to create his own unique sound. He has performed with artists including Bo Diddley, Buckwheat Zydeco, and Paul "Lil' Buck" Sinegal.
- Luther Allison – (August 17, 1939 – August 12, 1997) Born in Widener, Arkansas, and then moving to Chicago as a teen, Allison was a major force on the Chicago blues scene. Predominantly an electric guitarist and also a singer, Allison released many albums for Alligator Records.
- Linsey Alexander – Born July 23, 1942, Holly Springs, Mississippi, and moved to Chicago in 1959. Songwriter/singer/guitarist Alexander has been a fixture of Chicago blues for more than two decades and is known for his own electric blues style influenced by soul, R&B, and funk. His first internationally released CD was named "Blues CD of the Year".
- James Armstrong – Born April 22, 1957, Los Angeles, California, Armstrong has, to date, released three albums on HighTone Records and another three on Catfood Records.

== B ==
- Chico Banks – (March 7, 1962 – December 4, 2008) Born in Chicago, Banks released one album in 1997 on Evidence Records, and played with plenty of other blues musicians, before his death at the age of 46.
- Barrelhouse Chuck – (July 10, 1958 – December 12, 2016) Chicago blues and electric blues pianist, keyboardist, singer, and songwriter.
- Johnnie Bassett – (October 9, 1935 – August 4, 2012) Born in Marianna, Florida, Bassett, was a guitarist and vocalist who did session work for Fortune Records in the 1950s. He enjoyed a renewed career in the 1990s, and released six albums since 1994. Johnnie Bassett died from complications of liver cancer.
- Chris Beard – Born August 29, 1957, in Rochester, New York, Beard has released four albums to date, the first one of which was nominated for a Blues Music Award.
- Adolphus Bell – (June 5, 1944 – October 28, 2013) Born in Birmingham, Alabama, Bell was best known as a one-man band. He performed in a professional capacity for five decades and released two albums on the Music Maker label.
- Carey Bell – (November 14, 1936 – May 6, 2007) Born in Macon, Mississippi, as Carey Bell Harrington, Carey is an acoustic and electric harmonica blues and Chicago blues multi-instrumentalist, performing on bass guitar, guitar, drums and harmonica and vocals. He has released several albums for labels like Alligator Records and Delmark Records.
- Lurrie Bell – Born December 13, 1958, in Chicago, Illinois, guitarist and vocalist Bell is the son of blues harp player Carey Bell. Like his father, he is a Chicago blues musician who performs on electric guitar. He has recorded numerous albums, most of which have been for Delmark Records.
- Tab Benoit – Born November 16, 1967, in Baton Rouge, Louisiana, Benoit plays swamp blues on electric guitar. He is also a singer and songwriter. He has released at least fourteen albums to date.
- Duffy Bishop – Born in Redding, California, Bishop is a singer and songwriter. She is in the Cascade Blues Association and Washington Blues Society Halls of Fame, and has been given a Lifetime Achievement Award by both bodies. In a career spanning over forty years, Bishop has also been a costume designer and an actress in musical theatre. To date she and her band have released seven albums.
- Bobby "Blue" Bland – (January 27, 1930 – June 23, 2013) Born in Rosemark, Tennessee, as Robert Calvin Bland, he was an American singer of blues and soul. He was an original member of the Beale Streeters, and was sometimes referred to as the "Lion of the Blues". Along with such artists as Sam Cooke, Ray Charles, and Junior Parker, Bland developed a sound that mixed gospel with the blues and R&B.
- Little Joe Blue – (September 23, 1934 – April 22, 1990) Born in Vicksburg, Mississippi, United States, he was an American singer and guitarist. His musical style was often compared to B. B. King.
- Blues Boy Willie – Born November 28, 1946, in Memphis, Texas, he is an electric and soul blues singer, musician, and songwriter. He has released ten albums and a string of singles in a long career, including work which appeared in the US Billboard R&B albums chart.
- Juke Boy Bonner – (March 22, 1932 – June 29, 1978) Born in Bellville, Texas, as Weldon Bonner, Bonner was a Texas blues and West Coast blues guitarist and blues harp player as well as a vocalist. Though based primarily in Texas for most of his career, he did work in the 1950s in Oakland, California, and recorded there for Irma Records. Like so many of the early blues musicians, Bonner was forced to work in a meat processing plant in his later career just to make ends meet. He performed in both acoustic and electric blues environments.
- Boston Blackie – (November 6, 1943 – July 11, 1993). Stage name of Benjamin Joe "Bennie" Houston, born and raised in Alabama who established himself as a guitarist and singer on Chicago's West Side. He was shot dead by fellow musician Tail Dragger Jones.
- Pat Boyack – Born June 26, 1967, in Price, Utah, Boyack is a contemporary blues guitarist who performs modern electric blues and blues-rock. He has released at least four albums since 1994 for both the Doc Blues and Bullseye Blues record labels.
- Eddie Boyd – (November 25, 1914 – July 13, 1994) Born in Stovall, Mississippi, Boyd was a piano blues pianist, singer-songwriter and a fixture of the Chicago blues scene, touring Europe with Buddy Guy in 1965. Though he performed electric and acoustic Chicago blues, Boyd left the United States and lived abroad due to racial discrimination. He recorded for labels like Love Records and Decca Records.
- Diana Braithwaite – Born in Toronto, Ontario, Canada, Braithwaite is a Black Canadian electric blues singer, songwriter and screenwriter. She is a multiple Maple Blues Award winner. More recently she has teamed up with Chris Whiteley and they have been acclaimed as "blues icons" by the Toronto Star, and collectively have won nine Maple Blues Awards and had six Juno Award nominations. Although they are little known in the United States, Diana Braithwaite and Chris Whiteley are mainstays of the Canadian blues scene.
- Doyle Bramhall – (February 17, 1949 – November 12, 2011) Bramhall was strictly a Texas blues musician, a talented guitarist, drummer and singer who worked with Stevie Ray Vaughan and his brother Jimmie Vaughan. His son, Doyle Bramhall II is also a blues musician. He has released several solo albums.
- Billy Branch – Born October 3, 1951, in Great Lakes, Illinois, blues harp player and vocalist Branch is a harmonica blues performer who plays electric Chicago blues. He leads his own band, "The Sons of Blues" and has released several albums for labels such as Evidence Records and Alligator Records.
- Curley Bridges – (February 7, 1934 – November 27, 2014) Born in Fuquay-Varina, North Carolina, United States, Bridges spent most of his adult life living in Canada. He recorded four albums for Electro-Fi Records before his death in 2014, aged 80.
- John Brim – (April 10, 1922 – October 1, 2003) Born in Hopkinsville, Kentucky, Brim was an acoustic and electric Chicago blues guitarist, harmonica player and singer who performed regularly with his wife Grace on drums. He recorded for Fortune Records and Chess Records among others.
- Ronnie Baker Brooks – Born Rodney Dion Baker in Chicago, Illinois on January 23, 1967, is a blues singer and guitarist. His father, blues guitarist Lonnie Brooks, was a strong musical influence on Ronnie, as were Buddy Guy, Junior Wells and other Chicago blues luminaries who jammed at the Brookses' home while Ronnie was growing up. Wayne Baker Brooks is Ronnie's brother; the three Brookses often appear as guests in each other's shows.
- Clarence "Gatemouth" Brown – (April 18, 1924 – September 10, 2005) Born in Vinton, Louisiana, Brown was one of the regulars of the Texas blues scene. A multi-instrumentalist, he performed on guitar, harmonica, mandolin, bass guitar, violin and sang. Brown was the first artist to record for Peacock Records, and his style of play was influential on burgeoning talent in Texas. Later in his career he moved more away from acoustic modes of play in favor of electric blues, often fusing in his sound elements of calypso and zydeco.
- J. T. Brown – (April 2, 1918 – November 24, 1969) Born in Mississippi, Brown was an electric and acoustic Chicago blues tenor saxophonist and singer. He performed with musicians like Washboard Sam and Eddie Boyd, and backed other artists like Elmore James.
- Bob Brozman – (March 8, 1954 – April 23, 2013) Brozman was a slide guitarist who performs in various blues music mediums, including electric blues, country blues and some traditional folk music. He recorded at least fifteen albums for labels including Kicking Mule, and has worked with a variety of musicians performing not just in the blues medium.
- Nora Jean Bruso – Born June 21, 1956, in Greenwood, Mississippi, Bruso has released two solo albums to date and been nominated for several Blues Music Awards.
- Michael Burks – (July 30, 1957 – May 6, 2012) was a Milwaukee born blues guitarist who recorded for Alligator Records.
- Jimmy Burns – Born February 27, 1943, in Dublin, Mississippi. American soul blues and electric blues guitarist, singer-songwriter. Although he was born in the Mississippi Delta, Burns has spent nearly all his life in Chicago. His elder brother, Eddie "Guitar" Burns, was a Detroit blues musician.
- Cedric Burnside – Born August 26, 1978 is an electric blues drummer, guitarist, singer and songwriter. He is the son of blues drummer Calvin Jackson and grandson of blues singer, songwriter, and guitarist R. L. Burnside.
- Aron Burton – (June 15, 1938 – February 29, 2016) Burton played with Albert Collins, Freddie King and Champion Jack Dupree, and released a number of solo albums, including Good Blues to You (1999, Delmark).
- George "Wild Child" Butler – (October 1, 1936 – March 1, 2005) Birn in Hernando, Mississippi, George Butler was an electric guitarist, blues harp player and vocalist performing Chicago blues. He recorded in the 1960s and 1970s for various labels like Mercury Records with nominal success. In the 1980s he moved to Canada and continued recording and performing, his last album being for APO Records in 2001.
- The Butler Twins – American Detroit blues and electric blues duo of the twin brothers Clarence (January 21, 1942 – December 22, 2003) and Curtis Butler (January 21, 1942 – April 9, 2004). Longtime semi-professional performers in the local blues scene in Detroit, they gained international recognition following the recording of three albums in the late 1990s.
- Paul Butterfield – (December 17, 1942 – May 4, 1987) Born in Chicago, Illinois, Butterfield was an amplified harmonica blues blues harp player, guitarist, vocalist and flautist who performed blues-rock and Chicago blues. He recorded for a variety of labels during his career, including Bearsville Records and Elektra Records, among many others.

== C ==
- Chris Cain – (born November 19, 1955) is a guitarist.
- Goree Carter – (December 31, 1930 – December 29, 1990) Born in Houston, Texas, he was a Texas Blues singer, songwriter and guitarist, known for "Rock Awhile", a 1949 single considered a contender for the "first rock and roll record" title.
- Albert Castiglia – Born August 12, 1969, in New York City, is an electric blues singer, songwriter and guitarist. After working for Junior Wells and Sandra Hall, Castiglia has released eleven solo albums to date.
- Grady Champion – (born October 10, 1969) is an American electric blues harmonicist, singer, guitarist and songwriter. He has released ten albums to date.
- Good Rockin' Charles – (March 4, 1933 – May 17, 1989) Born Henry Lee Bester in Tuscaloosa, Alabama, Charles released one album in his lifetime, and is best known for his work with Johnny "Man" Young, Otis "Big Smokey" Smothers, Arthur "Big Boy" Spires and Jimmy Rogers.
- Laura Chavez – (born April 3, 1982) is an American blues, soul, and rhythm and blues guitarist, songwriter and record producer. She has worked with many other musicians, including Deborah Coleman, Candye Kane, Dani Wilde, The Mannish Boys, Mike Ledbetter, Monster Mike Welch, Vanessa Collier, Casey Hensley and Whitney Shay. In 2021, she was nominated for the 42nd Blues Music Awards in the category 'Instrumentalist – Guitar'.
- Chicago Blues All-Stars – American blues band based in Chicago and formed in 2007.
- W. C. Clark – (November 16, 1939 – March 2, 2024) Clark was one of the originators of blues in the city of Austin. A soul music singer and electric Texas blues guitarist, he had his start performing with T.D. Bell. He also can be seen performing onstage with Stevie Ray Vaughan for a 1980s episode of Austin City Limits. Following a tragic car wreck in 1997 that resulted in the death of his fiancée and drummer, Clark slowed down on touring and recording.
- William Clarke – (March 29, 1951 – November 2, 1996) Born in Inglewood, California, harmonica blues player and singer William Clarke was an electric Chicago blues musician. He performed for a variety of labels, such as Alligator Records, Watch Dog and Rivera.
- Eddy Clearwater – (January 10, 1935 – June 1, 2018) Clearwater moved to Chicago at the age of fifteen. He was a modern electric rhythm and blues and Chicago blues guitarist and singer, and has recorded numerous solo albums for Rounder Records, Delmark Records, and many other labels.
- Climax Blues Band – Formed in 1968 and based in Stafford, England, this band performs blues-rock in the Chicago blues vein. In their later years, they have also ventured into the arena of soft rock, roots rock and pop rock. The band has released numerous albums for labels like Sire Records and Warner Bros. Records, among others.
- Michael Coleman – (June 24, 1956 – November 2, 2014) Coleman played with James Cotton, Eddy Clearwater, Syl Johnson, and John Primer. From 1995, he released five albums, including issues on Delmark Records.
- Albert Collins – (October 1, 1932 – November 24, 1993) Born in Leona, Texas, Collins was one of the true greats of the Texas blues scene. An original songwriter, as well as an accomplished guitarist and singer, Collins performed with some of the best musicians the state of Texas had to offer. He released many recordings over his career, and enjoyed renewed appreciation for his art during the blues revival of the 1960s.
- Eli Cook – Born April 24, 1986, in Nelson County, Virginia, United States, Cook has released six albums before his 30th birthday.
- Johnny Copeland – (March 27, 1937 – June 3, 1997) Born in Haynesville, Louisiana, Copeland was both an acoustic and electric Texas blues guitarist and vocalist who only enjoyed real success late in his career during the 1990s. He recorded numerous solo albums, many for Rounder Records.
- Shemekia Copeland – Born April 10, 1979, in Harlem, New York, Copeland is a soul-blues singer who is backed by an electric blues band. She is the daughter of Johnny Copeland (the Texas blues guitarist) and has released nine solo albums.
- Sean Costello – (April 16, 1979 – April 15, 2008), from Atlanta, Georgia, was a blues guitarist and singer, whose early records were remarkably faithful to the original Chicago blues. His music later developed a strong soul influence, though his death at the age of 28 cut his career short.
- James Cotton – (July 1, 1935 – March 16, 2017) Cotton was a harmonica blues player and singer who got his start performing the Delta blues, later moving to Chicago and performing Chicago blues. Performing both in acoustic and electric settings, Cotton recorded dozens of albums for labels such as Alligator Records and Verve. He also led his own James Cotton Blues Band.
- Pee Wee Crayton – (December 18, 1914 – June 25, 1985) Born in Rockdale, Texas, Crayton was a frequent member of the Texas blues scene. Both an acoustic and electric blues guitarist and singer, he also performed rhythm and blues and West Coast blues when moving to Los Angeles, California in 1935. He recorded at least nine albums over his career, in addition to collaborations with other artists. Among the labels he worked for were Crown Records and Charly Records, among others.
- Arthur "Big Boy" Crudup – (August 24, 1905 – March 28, 1974) Born in Forest, Mississippi, Crudup was a guitarist and singer that began his career performing Delta blues. He later moved to Chicago, where he continued performing Delta blues and also Chicago blues, both in acoustic and electric environments. It was not until the blues revival of the 1960s that Crudup received widespread appreciation from audiences, performing until his death.
- Eddie Cusic – (January 4, 1926 – August 11, 2015) Born in Leland, Mississippi, Cusic was an African American, Mississippi blues guitarist, singer, and songwriter. In 1998, he released the album, I Want to Boogie.

== D ==
- Larry Dale – (January 7, 1923 – May 19, 2010) Born in Wharton, Texas, Dale was an R&B guitarist and occasional singer active in the 1950s and 1960s. He performed in New York City with a band that included Champion Jack Dupree and Mickey Baker. He was an exponent of East Coast blues, and released several recordings for Grover Records.
- Lester Davenport – (January 16, 1932 – March 17, 2009) Davenport was an electric Chicago blues harmonica player and vocalist. He was also sometimes called "Mad Dog" Davenport. He recorded his first album in 1991 for Earwig Music Company, and then in 2002 released I Smell a Rat for Delmark Records.
- Debbie Davies – Born August 22, 1952, in Los Angeles, California, Davies is a modern electric blues guitarist and singer who has performed for a variety of bands. She has also done some solo work and worked with John Mayall, recording at least nine albums. Her current record label is Telarc.
- James "Thunderbird" Davis – (November 10, 1938 – January 24, 1992) Born in Prichard, Alabama, United States, Davis recorded several singles for Duke Records in the early 1960s, enjoying moderate success with "Blue Monday" (1963). Dropping from public attention, his career was revived in 1989 with the release of his album, Check Out Time.
- Larry Davis – (December 4, 1936 – April 19, 1994) Born in Kansas City, Missouri, but raised in Little Rock, Arkansas, Davis was an acoustic and electric Texas blues and soul blues musician who was greatly influenced by Albert King. He recorded often with Fenton Robinson. He released albums for many labels, including Bullseye Blues, Duke Records, and many others.
- Maxwell Street Jimmy Davis – (March 2, 1925 – December 28, 1995) Born in Tippo, Mississippi, Davis played with John Lee Hooker, recorded an album for Elektra Records in the mid 1960s, and remained a regular street musician on Maxwell Street, Chicago, for over 40 years.
- Jimmy Dawkins – (October 24, 1936 – April 10, 2013) Dawkins was a guitarist and vocalist and a fixture of the modern electric Chicago blues scene. His first album was Fast Fingers, recorded in 1969 for Delmark Records, for whom he recorded several others. He has also worked for the Earwig Music label, among others.
- Ardie Dean – Born in 1955 in Humboldt, Iowa, Dean is a drummer, audio engineer and record producer. In a varied career spanning fifty years, Dean has been the musical director, and record producer for the Music Maker Relief Foundation since 1994.
- Bo Diddley – (December 30, 1928 – June 2, 2008) Born in McComb, Mississippi, Bo Diddley was a guitarist, vocalist and songwriter and was universally recognized as one of the founding fathers of rock and roll music and a pioneering figure in electric Chicago blues and rhythm and blues. He had a long career that began in the 1950s and continued nearly until his death. He recorded well over thirty albums for labels like Checker Records, Chess Records and Atlantic Records, among others.
- Willie Dixon – (July 1, 1915 – January 29, 1992) Born in Vicksburg, Mississippi, double-bassist, singer–songwriter, record producer and guitarist Dixon was a key figure on the acoustic and electric Chicago blues scene. He was heavily involved in helping start the careers of artists such as Bo Diddley and Muddy Waters. He recorded for numerous labels. He also performed jump blues and would sometimes sing jive.
- Lefty Dizz – (April 29, 1937 – September 7, 1993) Born Walter Williams in Osceola, Arkansas, and before his four-year tour of duty in the U.S. Air Force ended in 1956, Lefty began to play the guitar. When he returned to Chicago later that year, he came under the tutelage of Lacy Gibson and Earl Hooker. In 1958, Lefty joined Sonny Thompson's road band, playing rhythm 'n' blues throughout the country. During a gig in Seattle, a left-handed teenage guitarist named Jimi Hendrix, hung out with, and was influenced by, Lefty Dizz. In 1960, Lefty moved to Detroit, where he remained for four years, working with Junior Cannady and John Lee Hooker. From 1964 to 1971, Lefty worked with Junior Wells, during which time they toured the U.S., Canada, Africa, Europe, Southeast Asia, the Fiji Islands and Indonesia. Lefty then joined Hound Dog Taylor and the Houserockers, performing extensively until Hound Dog's passing in late 1975. He then formed his own band, Lefty Dizz and Shock Treatment. His most well-known compositions include "Bad Avenue", "I Found Out", If I Could Just Get My Hands on What I Got My Eyes On", Funny Acting Woman", "Somebody Stole My Christmas" and "Ain't It Nice to be Loved". Lefty Dizz died from esophageal cancer on September 7, 1993, at age 56, in Chicago.
- Little Arthur Duncan – (February 5, 1934 – August 20, 2008) Moved to Chicago in 1950 and accompanied Earl Hooker in the 1950s. He released three solo albums.
- Johnny Dyer – (December 7, 1938 – November 11, 2014) Born in Rolling Fork, Mississippi, Dyer released five albums.

== E ==
- Robert Ealey – (December 6, 1925 – March 8, 2001) was an electric blues singer, who performed Texas blues. Among other releases, he recorded a couple of albums for Black Top Records in the 1990s, having earlier formed a duo with U.P. Wilson.
- Ronnie Earl – (born March 10, 1953) Born Ronald Earl Horvath in Queens, New York, electric blues guitarist. Earl toured with Roomful of Blues before forming The Broadcasters in 1988, and has recorded and/or appeared on over 50 albums.
- Scott Ellison – (born February 13, 1954), electric blues guitarist, singer and songwriter. From starting working in music in the 1970s, Ellison has released 13 albums since his Chains of Love (1993) debut. Ellison has also written songs which have appeared in television programs and films including Sister Sister, Santa Barbara, Nashville, Buffy the Vampire Slayer, Joan of Arcadia, Saving Grace, and Justified, plus Reindeer Games, Feast of Love and Home Front.

== F ==
- The Fabulous Thunderbirds – Formed in 1974 in Austin, Texas, by Jimmie Vaughan and others, this group played the gambit of music. They perform blues-rock, Texas blues and rock and roll. Vaughan left the group in 1990.
- Richard Ray Farrell – Born 1956 in Niagara Falls, New York, Farrell has released ten albums in his own name to date, and has toured widely over a career that started in the mid-1970s.
- Cool John Ferguson – (December 3, 1953 – August 12, 2025) Born in Beaufort, South Carolina, United States, Ferguson released five albums under his own name and played on countless others. He was the Director of Creative Development for the Music Maker Relief Foundation.
- Samantha Fish - Born January 30, 1989, in Kansas City, Kansas, Fish is an American singer-songwriter and guitarist. While often cited as a blues artist, Fish's albums and live shows feature multiple genres, including rock, country, funk, bluegrass and ballads. In 2011, Fish recorded Runaway which won a 2012 Blues Music Award for Best New Artist.
- Kirk Fletcher – Born December 23, 1975, in Bellflower, California, Fletcher has released four studio albums and one live album. In addition, he has variously been a member of the Fabulous Thunderbirds and the Mannish Boys, plus supplied backing for Joe Bonamassa and Eros Ramazzotti. Fletcher has been nominated for four Blues Music Awards and was a 2015 British Blues Awards nominee.
- Billy Flynn – Born August 11, 1956, in Wisconsin, Flynn has recorded with The Legendary Blues Band and Mississippi Heat and released five solo albums.
- Sue Foley – Born March 29, 1968, in Ottawa, Ontario, Foley is a contemporary electric blues guitarist and singer who also performs roots rock. She has been compared to the likes of Bonnie Raitt by critics, and currently lives in Austin, Texas. She has released numerous albums for Ruf Records.
- Damon Fowler – Born in Brandon, Florida, Fowler has released eight albums to date, with three of them on Blind Pig Records.
- Carol Fran – (October 23, 1933 – September 1, 2021) Fran was a pianist and singer who performed various musical styles including soul-blues, swamp blues, and modern electric blues. She released four solo albums since 1992, her last in 2000 was in collaboration with Clarence Hollimon for JSP Records.
- Dany Franchi – Born 3 February 1990 in Genoa, Italy. Franchi has recorded three albums to date, with the first two crediting his backing band. His third studio album, Problem Child (2018), peaked at number 4 in the Billboard Top Blues Albums Chart.
- Guitar Pete Franklin – (January 16, 1928 – July 31, 1975) Born in Indianapolis, Indiana, Franklin was an African American blues singer, guitarist, pianist and songwriter. His best known track was "Guitar Pete's Blues". Franklin variously worked with a number of fellow blues musicians including St. Louis Jimmy Oden, Jazz Gillum, John Brim, Sunnyland Slim, and Tampa Red. A versatile and accomplished musician, Franklin was able to adapt to electric blues, and provided backing to many musicians.
- Denny Freeman – (August 7, 1944 – April 25, 2021) Born in Orlando, Florida, Freeman was a Texas blues electric guitarist and pianist better known for his collaborations with Jimmie Vaughan and his songwriting for the Vaughan Brothers.
- Lowell Fulson – (March 31, 1921 – March 6, 1999) Born in Tulsa, Oklahoma, Fulson was an innovator who performed guitar and sang in a variety of blues-based genres, particularly soul-blues, electric Texas blues and West Coast blues, as well as Urban blues. He performed with musicians like Alger "Texas" Alexander, and also had a long recording career releasing many solo albums.

== G ==
- Grady Gaines – (May 14, 1934 – January 29, 2021) Gaines was an electric Texas blues and jazz blues tenor saxophonist who recorded with Little Richard in the 1950s. He also backed other musicians such as Clarence Hollimon, Joe Medwick and James Brown. He released a few records for Black Top Records.
- Roy Gaines – (August 12, 1937 – August 11, 2021) Gaines was a protege of T-Bone Walker, he regularly played clubs throughout the Houston area before relocating to Los Angeles. He joined Roy Milton's band, followed by supporting Chuck Willis. His debut album, Gaineling (1982) was followed several others.
- Rory Gallagher – (March 2, 1948 – June 14, 1995) in County Donegal, Ireland, was both influenced by acoustic blues musicians including Willie Dixon, and Ledbelly, but as an extremely talented self-taught guitarist, was famous for his 1961 Fender Stratocaster. His strongest electric influences being Chicago blues artists, including Muddy Waters, and B.B. King. Preferring his own power trios, with an exception of five years with a keyboardist, he formed first Taste in 1968–1970, and from 1970 to 1995 after played only with his own band, recording on several different labels until his early death at age 47 from an infection sustained after a liver transplant.
- Lacy Gibson – (May 1, 1936 – April 11, 2011) American Chicago blues guitarist, singer and songwriter. He notably recorded the songs "My Love Is Real" and "Switchy Titchy" and in a long and varied career worked with Buddy Guy and Son Seals.
- Dennis Gruenling – Born in New Jersey, Gruenling is an American electric blues harmonicist, songwriter, record producer and radio DJ. He has released seven albums since 1999, with his most recent being 2016's Ready or Not. His contributions to other musician's albums has included stints playing the harmonica, audio engineering and mixing, production and album sleeve artwork. Gruenling has also been employed for over a decade as a DJ on WFDU college radio.
- Buddy Guy – (born July 30, 1936, Lettsworth, Louisiana). Acoustic and electric guitarist and an accomplished singer, one of the most recognizable artists of the Chicago blues. He has recorded numerous albums for Chess Records, Vanguard Records, Silvertone Records and other labels.
- Steve Guyger – (born September 12, 1952) Chicago blues harmonica player, singer, and songwriter. He has recorded five albums since 1997, having previously backed Jimmy Rogers for almost fifteen years.

== H ==
- Terry Hanck – (born 1944) is an American electric blues saxophonist, singer, songwriter and record producer, who won a Blues Music Award in 2015 in the 'Instrumentalist – Horn' category. Previously Hanck earned both a Blues Music Award and a Living Blues Award for 'Best Horn' in 2012, and was nominated for the latter prize in the 'Best Song' category. In May 2015, he won the International Songwriting Competition for his soul ballad, "I Keep On Holding On."
- Pat Hare – (December 20, 1930 – September 26, 1980) Born in Cherry Valley, Arkansas, he was a Memphis blues guitarist, who recorded with Howlin' Wolf, James Cotton, Muddy Waters, Bobby Bland and other artists.
- Harmonica Slim – (December 21, 1934 – June 16, 1984), was an American blues harmonicist, singer and songwriter.
- Slim Harpo – (January 11, 1924 – January 31, 1970) Born in Lobdell, Louisiana, Harpo is one of the best known blues neck-rack harmonica players from his era despite having begun his career as a guitarist. He played everything from Louisiana blues, swamp blues, electric blues and harmonica blues, and was also a singer.
- Casey Hensley – American female blues, swing, and rock and roll singer, songwriter and record producer. To date, Hensley has released two albums including her 2017 debut issue, Live.
- Matt Hill is an American electric blues singer, guitarist and songwriter. To date, Hill has released two albums, and he has also gained a reputation for his energetic live performances. Hill won a Blues Music Award in May 2011, in the category of 'Best New Artist Debut' for his first album, On the Floor.
- Z. Z. Hill – (September 30, 1935 – April 27, 1984), was an American blues singer best known for his recordings in the 1970s and early 1980s, including his 1982 album for Malaco Records, Down Home, which stayed on the Billboard soul album chart for nearly two years. The track "Down Home Blues" has been called the best-known blues song of the 1980s.
- Smokey Hogg – (January 27, 1914 – May 1, 1960) Born in Westconnie, Texas, Hogg began his career as a rhythm and blues musician. An acoustic and electric guitarist, singer and pianist, Hogg performed with musicians in Texas like Black Ace.
- Rick Holmstrom – (born May 30, 1965, Fairbanks, Alaska, United States), Holmstrom has released six albums since 1996, and previously worked with William Clarke and Rod Piazza.
- John Lee Hooker – (August 22, 1912 – June 21, 2001) Born in Clarksdale, Mississippi, Hooker was an acoustic and electric guitarist and singer who was perhaps the most well known exponent of the Delta blues sound, though he also performed Detroit blues.
- Ellis Hooks – (born 1974, Bay Minette, Alabama), has released six albums to date.
- Jay Hooks – (born November 12, 1967) American Texas blues and electric blues guitarist, singer and songwriter. After gaining national exposure playing in Lavelle White's backing ensemble, Hooks has released three albums to date, appeared on German television and undertaken various tours, including one in Europe.
- Lightnin' Hopkins – (March 15, 1912 – January 30, 1982) Born Sam Hopkins in Centerville, Texas, Hopkins was an acoustic and electric guitarist and a major exponent of Texas blues. During his late career he performed mostly on electric guitar, though in the same manner that he would perform on an acoustic one. Like John Lee Hooker, Hopkins is one of the better known blues musicians of history.
- Joe "Guitar" Hughes – (September 29, 1937 – May 20, 2003) Born in Houston, Texas. One of the unsung heroes of the Texas blues scene, Hughes was an acoustic and electric guitarist and vocalist. He performed with Bobby "Blue" Bland in the 1960s and released a series of solo albums in the late 1980s and 1990s for labels like Black Top Records and Double Trouble Records.
- Long John Hunter – (July 13, 1931 – January 4, 2016) He released three albums on Alligator Records in the 1990s. His dinal release, Looking for a Party was issued by Blue Express in October 2009.
- Steve Hunter – (born June 14, 1948) performed as rock guitarist with Lou Reed and Alice Cooper and later transformed into an electronic blues guitarist with his 2013 release of The Manhattan Blues Project.

== I ==
- Ironing Board Sam – (born July 17, 1939). Born in Rock Hill, South Carolina, this keyboardist, singer and songwriter has released a small number of singles and albums. Despite having several lows in his musical career, it has spanned over fifty years, and he released a new album in 2012.
- Daniel Ivankovich – (Chicago Slim) (born November 23, 1963). Founding member of the Chicago Blues All-Stars. He has performed and recorded with many Chicago blues musicians, including Otis Rush, Magic Slim and Junior Wells. He is also an orthopedic surgeon and a co-founder and medical director of OnePatient-Global Health Initiative, an organization that provides medical care to the poor in Chicago and abroad.

== J ==
- Fruteland Jackson – (born June 9, 1953) Born in Sunflower County, Mississippi, Jackson is an American electric blues guitarist, singer and songwriter. Henry Townsend stated, "My respect for Fruteland Jackson is very high. He and my boy Alvin Youngblood Hart is the future sound of true acoustic blues." He has also worked with children to raise awareness of blues music and has been honored for his work in that field, including in 1997 being granted a W. C. Handy Award for "Keeping the Blues Alive" in Education.
- Vasti Jackson – (born October 20, 1959) is an American electric blues guitarist, singer, songwriter and record producer. At the 59th Annual Grammy Awards, Jackson's album, The Soul of Jimmie Rodgers was nominated in the Best Traditional Blues Album category.
- Chris James and Patrick Rynn – are an American electric blues and Chicago blues duo, comprising Chris James on lead guitar and vocals and Patrick Rynn on bass guitar. The twosome first met in 1990 in Chicago, Illinois, United States. Their debut album, Stop and Think About It, was nominated for a 2009 Blues Music Award.
- Elmore James – (January 27, 1918 – May 24, 1963) Born in Richland, Mississippi, James was a slide guitarist on acoustic and electric guitars and also a singer. He performed both Delta blues and Chicago blues, though he is most well known for the latter. His technique influenced a generation of guitarists that followed.
- Bobo Jenkins – (January 7, 1916 – August 14, 1984) Born in Forkland, Alabama, Jenkins was an electric blues guitarist and songwriter, who later owned his own recording studio and record label in Detroit.
- Big Jack Johnson – (July 30, 1940 – March 14, 2011) was an American electric blues musician, one of the "present-day exponents of an edgier, electrified version of the raw, uncut Delta blues sound." He was also one of a small number of blues musicians to play mandolin, winning a W. C. Handy Award in 2003 for best acoustic blues album.
- Luther "Guitar Junior" Johnson – (April 11, 1939 – December 25, 2022) was a Chicago blues electric guitarist who is better known for his long stints working with Muddy Waters in the 1970s. In 1980 he began doing solo work, though his debut album was released in 1976 for Evidence Records. He also recorded for Telarc and Bullseye Blues.
- Jeremiah Johnson – (born 1972, St. Louis, Missouri), he is a blues singer, guitarist and songwriter. His music blends elements of St. Louis blues, southern rock, and country.
- Luther "Georgia Boy" Johnson – (August 30, 1934 – March 18, 1976) Born in Davisboro, Georgia, he was also known as "Snake" or "Snake Boy", and was otherwise billed as both Luther King and Little Luther (under the latter he recorded for Chess Records in the 1960s). His birth name was Lucius Brinson Johnson.
- Willie Johnson – (March 4, 1923 – February 26, 1995) Born in Senatobia, Mississippi, he was a Memphis blues guitarist, known for his early use of distortion and power chords in 1951.
- Andrew "Jr. Boy" Jones – (born October 16, 1948) Born in Dallas, Texas, Jones is a guitarist, singer and songwriter, whose recorded work has been released on five albums. In 1995, he was also part of the ensemble that garnered a Blues Music Award as the 'Band of the Year'.
- Calvin "Fuzz" Jones – (June 9, 1926 – August 9, 2010) Born in Greenwood, Mississippi, Jones played electric bass guitar and backed Muddy Waters. He also played with Mississippi Heat and the Legendary Blues Band.
- Johnny "Yard Dog" Jones – (June 21, 1941 – September 16, 2015) was a Chicago blues and soul blues guitarist and vocalist, who recorded Ain't Gonna Worry, a W.C. Handy Award winner for best new male blues artist in 1997.
- Tail Dragger Jones – (September 30, 1940 – September 4, 2023). American Chicago blues singer who performed since the 1960s and released four albums. Jones gained a certain notoriety in 1993, after being convicted of second-degree murder for the killing of fellow blues musician, Boston Blackie.
- Tutu Jones – (born September 9, 1966, Dallas, Texas) is electric blues and soul blues guitarist, singer and songwriter, who has released five albums since 1994.

== K ==
- Harrison Kennedy – Born March 9, 1942, in Hamilton, Ontario, Canada, Kennedy is a Black Canadian electric blues, R&B, and soul blues, singer-songwriter and multi-instrumentalist. He is best known for being the lead vocalist on the Chairmen of the Board song, "Chairman of the Board", but has had a varied solo career since the mid-1970s. He was awarded the 2016 "Blues Album of the Year" Juno Award for his release, This Is From Here. It was Kennedy's sixth nomination for that Award. He is also a Blues Music Award, and multiple Maple Blues Award nominee.
- King Biscuit Boy (March 9, 1944 – January 5, 2003) Canadian blues musician. He was the first Canadian blues artist to chart on the Billboard Hot 100 in the US. He played guitar and sang, but he was most noted for his harmonica playing. His stage name, given to him by Ronnie Hawkins, was taken from the King Biscuit Time, an early American blues broadcast.
- Eddie King (April 21, 1938 – March 14, 2012). Guitarist, singer-songwriter.
- Freddie King – (September 3, 1934 – December 28, 1976) Born in Gilmer, Texas, King was an electric rhythm and blues and Texas blues guitarist who performed with a long list of blues greats throughout his career. He recorded extensively in the 1960s for King Records.
- Little Jimmy King – (December 4, 1964 – July 21, 2002) released three albums in the 1990s before his death aged 37.
- Eddie Kirkland – (August 16, 1923 – February 27, 2011) American electric blues guitarist, harmonicist, singer-songwriter. He performed with artists including John Lee Hooker and many others. He had an extensive recording career with over ten solo albums.
- Bob Kirkpatrick – Born January 10, 1934, in Haynesville, Louisiana, he later settled in Dallas, Texas, and has released three albums to date.
- Alexis Korner – (April 19, 1928 – January 1, 1984) Born in Paris, France Korner spent most of his career in England, and was a major exponent of British blues and blues-rock. A guitarist and vocalist, he released dozens of recordings in his career.
- Smokin' Joe Kubek – (November 30, 1956 – October 11, 2015) Kubek was an electric blues guitarist and vocalist in the Texas blues tradition. His band, "The Smokin' Joe Kubek Band", released their debut album in 1991 for Bullseye Blues titled Steppin' Out Texas Style. He first had his start backing other musicians including Freddie King. Kubek released other albums with his band and also undertook some solo work.

== L ==
- Pierre Lacocque – (born October 13, 1952) is a Chicago-based blues harmonica player, composer, songwriter, and bandleader of Mississippi Heat, who has released many albums, the most recent six of which are on Delmark Records.
- Ernie Lancaster – (November 30, 1953 – July 17, 2014) was a Florida-based guitarist who released two albums in his lifetime, and backed James Brown in Europe in 1993.
- Lady Bianca – (born August 8, 1953, Kansas City, Missouri) is an electric blues singer, who has worked as a session singer, depicted Billie Holiday on stage, and since 1995 has released eight solo albums.
- Johnny Laws – (January 12, 1943 – March 28, 2021) was an American Chicago blues guitarist, singer and songwriter. A regular performer for over half a century in Chicago's South Side clubs, Laws released two albums, including Burnin' in My Soul, which caused Blues & Rhythm magazine in November 1999 to note "It's a real shame that Johnny Laws has been unjustly ignored in the past... This is an enjoyable CD... Full marks to those folks at Electro-Fi."
- Calvin Leavy – (April 20, 1940 – June 6, 2010) was a soul blues and electric blues singer and guitarist. He had a hit single in 1970, when his song "Cummins Prison Farm", peaked at number 40 on the US Billboard R&B chart, and stayed in the chart for five weeks.
- Frankie Lee – (April 29, 1941 – April 24, 2015) was an American soul blues and electric blues singer and songwriter, who released six albums.
- Lovie Lee – (March 17, 1909 – May 23, 1997) Chicago blues pianist who worked with Muddy Waters and recorded an album, Good Candy, which was released on the Earwig label.
- Barry Levenson – American electric blues and Chicago blues guitarist, singer-songwriter and record producer. He has released five albums in his own name.
- Papa Lightfoot – (March 2, 1924 – November 28, 1971) Born in Natchez, Mississippi, Lightfoot was a blues harp player and singer who did recordings for Sultan Records, Aladdin Records and Excello Records. He was not well known until the blues revival of the 1960s.
- Hip Linkchain – (November 10, 1936 – February 13, 1989). Guitarist, singer and songwriter.
- John "Juke" Logan – (September 11, 1946 – August 30, 2013) was an electric blues harmonica player, musician, singer, pianist and songwriter. He is best known for his harmonica playing on the theme music for television programs (Home Improvement and Roseanne) and films (Crossroads and La Bamba). In addition to playing on many other musicians' work, Logan released four solo albums, and wrote songs for Poco, John Mayall and Gary Primich.
- Hamilton Loomis – (born November 1, 1975) is a guitarist, singer, songwriter, and record producer. One of his eight albums released to date, Ain't Just Temporary, peaked at number 7 in the Billboard Top Blues Albums Chart in September 2007.
- Joe Hill Louis – (September 23, 1921 – August 5, 1957) Born as Lester Hill in Raines, Tennessee, he was a Memphis blues singer, guitarist, harmonica player and one-man band, who experimented with overdriven electric guitar distortion as well as vocal rapping in 1950.
- Louisiana Red – (March 23, 1932 – February 25, 2012), was an American blues guitarist, harmonica player, and singer, who recorded more than 50 albums. He was best known for his song "Sweet Blood Call".
- Karen Lovely – (born November 23, 1959) American electric blues singer and songwriter. Lovely has released five albums to date, with her most recent being Fish Outta Water (2017). She was a nominee at the 2016 Blues Music Awards as "Contemporary Blues Female Artist of the Year".
- Trudy Lynn – (born August 9, 1947) is an American electric blues and soul blues singer and songwriter, whose recorded work has been released on twelve studio albums, one live album, and four compilation albums.

== M ==
- Clara McDaniel – (born November 26, 1948) is an American blues singer and songwriter.
- Lonnie Mack – (July 18, 1941 – April 21, 2016), Mack performed as an electric guitarist and singer. He is widely considered to be the founder of the blues rock guitar genre, with his 1963 hits, "Memphis" and "Wham!", but also received critical acclaim as one of the best of the early blue-eyed soul singers.
- Janiva Magness – (born January 30, 1957, Detroit, Michigan), Magness was named the B.B. King Entertainer of the Year in 2009, becoming only the second woman, after Koko Taylor, to be so honored. She has released 15 albums to date.
- Taj Mahal – (born May 17, 1942, New York City), Taj Mahal performs on guitar, harmonica and banjo and also sings. Mahal explores a variety of genres which he fuses into his music, including zydeco. He performs in both acoustic and electric settings, depending on the material.
- Big Joe Maher (born c. 1953) is an American electric blues drummer, singer-songwriter. His backing band are known as the Dynaflows.
- Lisa Mann – American electric blues bassist, singer-songwriter. In 2015 and 2016, she won a Blues Music Award.
- Johnny Mars – (born December 7, 1942) is an electric blues harmonica player, singer, and songwriter.
- Johnnie Marshall – (born June 2, 1961) American guitarist, singer-songwriter. Discovered by Johnny Rawls in the mid 1990s, Marshall has released three albums on JSP Records and continues as a live performer to the present day.
- Krissy Matthews – (born May 25, 1992) British-Norwegian blues rock singer-songwriter and guitarist. He had released three albums by the age of 18. His most recent and fifth album, Scenes From a Moving Window, was released by Promise Records in 2015.
- John Mayall – (29 November 1933 – 22 July 2024) was an English blues and rock musician, songwriter and producer. In the 1960s, he formed John Mayall & the Bluesbreakers, a band that has counted among its members some of the most famous blues and blues rock musicians. A singer, guitarist, harmonica player, and keyboardist, he had a career that spanned nearly seven decades, remaining an active musician until his death aged 90. Mayall has often been referred to as the "godfather of the British blues", and was inducted into the Rock and Roll Hall of Fame in the musical influence category in 2024.
- Pete Mayes – (March 21, 1938 – December 16, 2008) Born in Double Bayou, Texas. He performed for over fifty years, and was awarded a W.C. Handy Award for 'comeback album of the year' in 1998.
- Earring George Mayweather – (September 27, 1928 – February 12, 1995) Born in Montgomery, Alabama, United States. Although he only recorded a single solo album, Mayweather's harmonica work appeared on recordings by J. B. Hutto and Eddie Taylor.
- Gerry McAvoy – (born December 19, 1951, Belfast, County Antrim, Northern Ireland) is a Northern Irish blues bass guitarist, who played from 1970 to 1995 with fellow Irish bluesman Rory Gallagher's band, usually consisting of power trios. After Gallagher's early death, he joined Nine Below Zero, based in London, England.
- Jerry McCain – (June 18, 1930 – March 28, 2012), was an American electric blues musician, best known as a harmonica player.
- Cash McCall – (January 28, 1941 – April 20, 2019) American electric blues guitarist, singer and songwriter. He was best known for his 1966 R&B hit "When You Wake Up". Over his long career, his musical style evolved from gospel music to soul music to the blues.
- Kevin McKendree – (born April 27, 1969, Nuremberg, Germany) American electric blues pianist, keyboardist, guitarist, singer, and songwriter. In addition to his lengthy and varied career as a session musician, McKendree has released two solo albums.
- Kid Memphis – (born December 7, 1971, Memphis, Tennessee), is an American electric blues guitarist and singer. He has a record released on Vizztone and one on Retrofonic.
- Michael Messer – (born 28 February 1956, Middlesex, England) is an English singer-songwriter, guitarist and record producer. He, along with Steve Phillips and Bob Greenwood, is noteworthy for his ability to combine acoustic National steel guitar, as well as slide guitar, into his playing style. The American magazine, Spirit, listed Messer as one of the greatest slide guitarists alongside Duane Allman and Ry Cooder.
- Floyd Miles – (April 13, 1943 – January 25, 2018) Electric blues and soul blues guitarist, singer and songwriter. He released four solo albums.
- Luke "Long Gone" Miles – (May 8, 1925 – November 22, 1987) Texas and electric blues singer-songwriter.
- Biscuit Miller – (born December 30, 1961, South Side, Chicago, Illinois, United States) is an American bassist, singer and songwriter. He writes most of his own material, and has released three albums to date. In 2012 and 2017, Miller won a Blues Music Award.
- Little Milton – (September 7, 1934 – August 4, 2005) Born in Inverness, Mississippi, Little Milton (born Milton Campbell) performed everything from soul-blues to outright boogie-woogie and rhythm and blues. A guitarist and singer, he released countless albums over a long career.
- R.J. Mischo – (born March 18, 1960) Harmonicist, singer-songwriter, and record producer. To date he has released eleven albums on a number of labels, and his music has been aired on independent film scores, television commercials, and documentaries on the Discovery Channel. Mischo has contributed to a couple of Mel Bay harmonica instruction books. In addition, he was listed in that author's The Encyclopedia of Harmonica.
- McKinley Mitchell – (December 25, 1934 – January 18, 1986) Born in Jackson, Mississippi, Mitchell was a Chicago-based soul-blues and rhythm and blues singer who started out performing Gospel music. He recorded singles for Boxer Records, Chess Records (with Willie Dixon), and a variety of other labels. In his later career he returned to Mississippi and recorded "I Won't Be Back for More" in 1984.
- Johnny B. Moore – (born January 24, 1950, Clarksdale, Mississippi) Chicago and electric blues guitarist and singer, who has released nine albums since 1993.
- Mike Morgan – (born November 30, 1959) Morgan is bandleader of "Mike Morgan & the Crawl", a Texas blues band. He is a guitarist and blues harp player, and has released a series of albums for Black Top and Severn Records.
- Big Bill Morganfield – William Morganfield (born June 19, 1956) Son of blues legend Muddy Waters. He came to music relatively late in life, recording his first album 1997. He has since recorded six additional albums, and is a recipient of the 2000 W. C. Handy Award for best new artist.
- Nick Moss – (born December 15, 1969) Guitarist, bassist, harmonica player and singer.
- Mr. Bo – (April 7, 1932 – September 19, 1995) Born in Indianola, Mississippi, Mr. Bo was a Detroit-based guitarist, singer and songwriter. Primarily working as a live performer in Detroit for four decades, his co-written song, "If Trouble Was Money", was later recorded by both Charlie Musselwhite and Albert Collins.
- Bobby Murray – (June 9, 1953 – April 30, 2026) Born in Nagoya, Japan, Murray played in Etta James' backing band for 20 years, performed on three Grammy Award winning recordings with James and B. B. King, and released three solo albums. In 2011, the Detroit Blues Society granted him their Lifetime Achievement Award.

== N ==
- John Németh – (born March 10, 1975) Electric blues and soul harmonicist, singer, and songwriter. He has received two Blues Music Awards for Soul Blues Male Artist in 2014 and Soul Blues Album in 2015. He has recorded nine solo albums since 2002, having also backed Junior Watson, Anson Funderburgh and Elvin Bishop.
- Sugar Ray Norcia – (born Raymond Alan Norcia, June 6, 1954, Stonington, Connecticut) is an electric and soul blues singer and harmonica player. He is best known for his work with his backing band, The Bluetones, with whom he has released seven albums since 1980.
- Darrell Nulisch – (born September 14, 1952, in Dallas) Singer and harmonica player, has worked with Anson Funderburgh and Ronnie Earl as well as issuing several solo albums.

== O ==
- Andrew Odom (December 15, 1936 – December 23, 1991). Chicago blues and electric blues singer and songwriter.
- Omar & the Howlers – Formed in the early 1980s in Austin, Texas, and led by guitarist Omar Kent Dykes, the group performs electric Texas blues, rock and roll and blues-rock. The band is especially popular in Europe. The group has released at least sixteen albums for labels like Columbia Records, Watermelon Records and Black Top Records. Dykes has also had a successful career as a solo artist.
- Jay Owens (September 6, 1947 – November 26, 2005) Owens a blind electric blues and soul blues guitarist, singer and songwriter.

== P ==
- Sista Monica Parker – (born Monica C. Parker, April 27, 1956 – October 9, 2014) Singer-songwriter and record producer from Gary, Indiana, who released eleven albums.
- Neal Pattman – (January 10, 1926 – May 4, 2005) Harmonicist from Madison County, Georgia, who found fame late in life.
- Gary Primich – (April 20, 1958 – September 23, 2007) Harmonicist, guitarist and songwriter, who was born in Chicago but subsequently relocated to Texas.
- Tom Principato – (born 1952) Singer, guitarist, and songwriter from Washington, D.C., who has released over 20 albums.

== R ==
- Bobby Radcliff – born Robert Radcliff Ewan, September 22, 1951, Washington, D.C., is an American blues guitarist and singer. Radcliff is an active guitarist. Radcliff was raised in Bethesda, Maryland.
- Kid Ramos – Born January 13, 1959, in Fullerton, California American electric blues rock guitarist, who has performed with James Harman and The Fabulous Thunderbirds, as well as releasing five solo albums since 1995.
- Sugaray Rayford – (born February 13, 1969) is an American soul blues singer and songwriter. He has released five albums to date and been granted three Blues Music Awards. Rayford's latest album, Somebody Save Me, was nominated for a Grammy Award in the Best Contemporary Blues Album category.
- Robert Bradley's Blackwater Surprise – Robert Bradley, frontman – born February 2, 1950, in Evergreen, Alabama. Inspired by The Blind Boys of Alabama, Bradley's sound is somewhere between blues, soul, and alternative rock. Bradley has also appeared in an HBO movie and appeared in performances with musician friend Kid Rock.
- Sherman Robertson – (October 27, 1948 – January 28, 2021) was a guitarist, songwriter and singer who recorded two albums in the 1990s for Atlantic/Code Blue Records.
- Duke Robillard – Born October 4, 1948, in Woonsocket, Rhode Island, Robillard is a founding member of Roomful of Blues. An electric guitarist, he has performed jazz blues and swing music in addition to his contemporary blues sound. He has released dozens of albums for labels like Stony Plain Records, Rounder Records and Virgin Records.
- Fenton Robinson – (September 23, 1935 – November 25, 1997) Born in Minter City, Mississippi, Robinson performed everything from soul blues and Texas blues to what he is most remembered for, the Chicago blues. He was discovered by Bobby Bland, who soon got him recording for Duke Records. A guitarist and singer, Robinson played both acoustic and electric guitar. He appeared on "Texas Flood" by Larry Davis in 1958. In the 1960s he moved to Chicago, where he later recorded extensively for Alligator Records.
- Tad Robinson – Born June 24, 1956, in New York City, Robinson is a soul-blues singer and blues harp player, singing much in the vein of Robert Cray or Joe Cocker. He has released seven solo albums, two for Delmark Records and five for Severn Records.
- Mighty Mo Rodgers – Born July 24, 1942, in East Chicago, Indiana, is an American electric blues musician, singer, songwriter, and record producer, who has released seven albums to date.
- Sonny Rodgers – (December 4, 1939 – May 7, 1990) was an American guitarist, singer and songwriter. He won a W.C. Handy Award for his release "Cadillac Baby" b/w "Big Leg Woman", which the Blues Foundation deemed to the 'Blues Single of 1990'. His subsequent debut album, They Call Me the Cat Daddy, was acclaimed but coincided with his early death in May 1990, just prior to embarking on a UK tour.
- Arlen Roth – Born October 30, 1952, in The Bronx, New York, is an American electric blues guitarist whose debut album, Guitarist, was voted Best Instrumental Album at Montreux in 1978, and he has performed with Paul Butterfield, Duane Eddy, John Prine, Simon & Garfunkel, John Sebastian, Phoebe Snow and many more. In 2016, he was voted into the New York Blues Hall of Fame and was voted in the Top 100 most influential guitarists by Vintage Guitar magazine.
- Freddie Roulette – (May 3, 1939 – December 24, 2022)) Electric blues guitarist and singer. He was best known as an exponent of the lap steel guitar. He was a member of the band Daphne Blue and collaborated with Earl Hooker, Charlie Musselwhite, Henry Kaiser, and Harvey Mandel. He also released several solo albums.

== S ==
- Johnny Sansone – Born September 27, 1957, in West Orange, New Jersey, Sansone has released eleven albums to date, and is a Blues Music Award winner for his song, "The Lord Is Waiting and The Devil Is Too".
- E.C. Scott – (born September 14, 1951 or late 1950s) is an American electric blues, soul blues, gospel and soul singer, songwriter, record producer and television host.
- Preston Shannon – (October 23, 1947 – January 22, 2018) was an American electric blues and soul blues guitarist, singer and songwriter. Among the songs he wrote are "Beale Street Boogaloo" and "Midnight in Memphis".
- Whitney Shay (born September 16, 1985) is an American blues, soul, and rhythm and blues singer and songwriter. To date, Shay has released three albums including her 2012 debut issue, Soul Tonic.
- Roscoe Shelton – (August 22, 1931 – July 27, 2002) Born in Lynchburg, Tennessee Blues and R&B singer, best remembered for his 1965 R&B Hit, "Strain on My Heart".
- Lonnie Shields – Born April 17, 1956, in West Helena, Arkansas, Shields has released seven albums to date.
- Frankie Lee Sims – (April 30, 1917 – May 10, 1970) Electric Texas blues guitarist.
- Matthew Skoller – Born August 3, 1962, in Canton, New York, Skoller is a Chicago blues harmonicist, singer, songwriter, and record producer. He has released five albums, as well as recording his harmonica playing on other musicians work.
- Guitar Slim – (December 10, 1926 – February 7, 1959) Born in Greenwood, Mississippi, he was a New Orleans blues singer and guitarist, known for "The Things That I Used to Do" from 1953, which contributed to the development of rock and roll as well as soul music.
- Drink Small – Born January 28, 1933, in Bishopville, South Carolina Known as the "Blues Doctor".
- Barkin' Bill Smith (August 18, 1928 – April 24, 2000) Born in Mississippi, Smith lived in Detroit and St. Louis before he moved to his final home in Chicago. Smith was a Chicago blues singer who undertook solo work and also sang for electric blues bands such as Dave Specter & the Bluebirds. He received his name from Homesick James Williamson in the 1950s, but did not record his own album until 1991 for Delmark Records with Dave Specter, and then a follow-up release in 1994 titled Gotcha!.
- George "Harmonica" Smith – (April 22, 1924 – October 2, 1983) Born in Helena, Arkansas Harmonica blues blues harp player and singer and exponent of West Coast blues, spending most of his career in Los Angeles, California. Playing harmonica on an amplified microphone as well as in acoustic settings, he released a number of albums under his own name.
- J.P. Soars – (born 1969) in Anaheim, California Singer, guitarist, songwriter and record producer. In 2021, he was nominated for a Blues Music Award in the 'Contemporary Blues Male Artist' category.
- Angela Strehli – (born November 22, 1945) Singer-songwriter and Texas blues historian.
- Bob Stroger – (born December 27, 1930) Stroger has worked since the 1960s. He has backed Eddie King, Otis Rush and Sunnyland Slim and released two solo albums. In 2011, he was granted a Blues Music Award.
- Percy Strother – (July 23, 1946 – May 29, 2005) American electric blues guitarist, singer and songwriter. After a tragic start in life, from the mid 1970s, Strother went on to become a mainstay of the Minneapolis blues scene.

== T ==
- Tarheel Slim – (September 24, 1924 – August 21, 1977) Born in Wilson, North Carolina, as Alden Bunn, Tarheel Slim was a guitarist and singer. Early in his career he was an exponent of Piedmont blues, rhythm and blues and East Coast blues. Later in his career he began performing in these styles on electric guitar.
- Demetria Taylor – (born February 28, 1973). Singer and songwriter, the daughter of the underneath named musician.
- Eddie Taylor – (January 29, 1923 – December 25, 1985). Electric blues guitarist and singer.
- Eddie Taylor Jr. – (March 27, 1972 – March 8, 2019). Chicago blues and electric blues guitarist, singer and songwriter. Son of the above.
- Susan Tedeschi – (November 9, 1970) Born in Boston, Massachusetts, Tedeschi is a contemporary blues guitarist and singer who began singing at age four. She has released at least six albums to date, her latest two for the Verve Records label.
- Ron Thompson – (July 5, 1953 – February 15, 2020) Born in Oakland, California, Thompson released seven albums on labels including Blind Pig. He worked with Little Joe Blue, John Lee Hooker, Lowell Fulson, Etta James and Big Mama Thornton.
- Lil' Dave Thompson – (May 21, 1969 – February 14, 2010) was an electric blues guitarist, singer and songwriter. He is best known for his tracks "She Didn't Say Goodbye" and "I Got the Blues".
- Andrew Tibbs – (February 2, 1929 – May 5, 1991) was an electric blues and urban blues singer and songwriter. He is best known for his controversial 1947 recording "Bilbo Is Dead", a song relating to the demise of Theodore G. Bilbo.
- Teeny Tucker – (January 22, 1958) Born in Dayton, Ohio, the daughter of Tommy Tucker, she has released six albums to date and been nominated twice for a Blues Music Award.

== V ==
- Stevie Ray Vaughan – (October 3, 1954 – August 27, 1990) Born in Dallas, Texas, Vaughan was a major force on the Texas blues scene and a talented blues-rock guitarist and singer. He was leader of the band Stevie Ray Vaughan and Double Trouble, formerly known as Triple Threat. He recorded many albums for Epic Records, and was one of the more popular blues musicians of the modern era.

== W ==
- Victor Wainwright – Born February 4, 1981 in Savannah, Georgia, Wainwright is an electric blues and boogie-woogie singer, songwriter, and pianist. In 2014, Wainwright won the 'Pinetop Perkins Piano Player of the Year' award at the Blues Music Awards for the second consecutive year.
- Joe Louis Walker – (December 25, 1949 – April 30, 2025) Born in San Francisco, California, Walker was best known as an electric blues guitarist, singer, songwriter and record producer. His knowledge of blues history was revealed by his use of older material and playing styles.
- Johnny "Big Moose" Walker – (June 27, 1927 – November 27, 1999) Born in Stoneville, Mississippi, as John Mayon Walker, he worked with many blues musicians including Ike Turner, Sonny Boy Williamson II, Lowell Fulson, Choker Campbell, Elmore James, Earl Hooker, Muddy Waters, Otis Spann, Sunnyland Slim, Jimmy Dawkins, and Son Seals.
- Seth Walker – Born 1972 in North Carolina, he has released 10 albums to date, including Leap of Faith (2009) which peaked at number 2 in the US Billboard Top Blues Album chart.
- T-Bone Walker – (May 28, 1910 – March 16, 1975) Born in Linden, Texas, as Aaron Thibeaux Walker, T-Bone Walker is easily one of the most well known artists of Texas blues. An acoustic and electric guitarist, Walker recorded a slew of albums for record labels like Capitol Records, Imperial Records, Brunswick Records, and many others.
- Baby Boy Warren – (August 13, 1919 – July 1, 1977) Born in Lake Providence, Louisiana, as Robert Warren, but raised in Memphis, guitarist and singer Warren was a stalwart of the Detroit blues scene. He released some solo albums and worked also as a backup artist for people like Sonny Boy Williamson.
- Muddy Waters – (April 4, 1913 – April 30, 1983) Born in Rolling Fork, Mississippi, as McKinley Morganfield, slide guitarist Waters began his career playing the Delta blues. However, he is most known as a Chicago blues musician.
- Johnny "Guitar" Watson – (February 3, 1935 – May 17, 1996) Born in Houston, Texas, Watson had his beginnings performing Texas blues, a tradition he embraced until his death in 1996 while touring in Japan. He also performed rhythm and blues and funk music, and released well over twenty albums for various record labels.
- Carl Weathersby – (February 24, 1953 – August 9, 2024) was an American electric blues vocalist, guitarist, and songwriter. He worked with Albert King and Billy Branch, among others, and had a career as a solo artist. He was nominated for the W. C. Handy Award for Best New Blues Artist in 1997.
- Monster Mike Welch – Born June 11, 1979, in Boston, Massachusetts, Welch is an American electric blues guitarist, singer and songwriter. He was nominated for a Blues Music Award in 2017 and 2018. Welch has released seven albums to date, and is a member of Sugar Ray & the Bluetones.
- Valerie Wellington – (November 14, 1959 – January 2, 1993). Born in Chicago, Wellington was a trained classical opera singer, who successfully turned to recording Chicago electric blues material.
- Albert White – Born December 1, 1942, Atlanta, Georgia, is a guitarist, singer and songwriter. He has released two albums in his own name, although his musical career started in the late 1950s, when he played in Piano Red's then ensemble, later known as Dr. Feelgood & the Interns.
- Lavelle White – Born July 3, 1929, in Amite City, Louisiana, White recorded for Duke Records in the 1950s and early 1960s, before issuing a comeback album in 1994 on Antone's Records.
- Lynn White – Born August 6, 1953, Mobile, Alabama, White is a soul blues singer and songwriter. Between 1978 and 2006, she released fourteen albums, three compilation albums, and numerous singles.
- Lester Williams – (June 24, 1920 – November 13, 1990) was a Texas blues and electric blues guitarist, singer and songwriter. He is best known for his song "Winter Time Blues" and "I Can't Lose with the Stuff I Use".
- Big Daddy Wilson – Born August 19, 1960, Edenton, North Carolina, Wilson is an electric and soul blues singer and songwriter. Most of his solo recordings have been released by the German record label, Ruf Records. To date, Wilson has appeared on more than a dozen albums.
- Roger "Hurricane" Wilson – Born July 27, 1953, in Newark, New Jersey, Wilson has released over a dozen albums. In addition he is an advisory board member of the Georgia Music Industry Association, and an International Blues Challenge judge.
- Smokey Wilson – (July 11, 1936 – September 8, 2015) spent most of his career performing West Coast blues and Juke Joint blues in Los Angeles, California. He has recorded at least eleven albums for record labels such as P-Vine Records, Bullseye Blues and Texmuse Records. His career got off to a late start, with international recognition eluding him until the 1990s.
- U.P. Wilson – (September 4, 1934 – September 22, 2004) Born in Caddo Parish, Shreveport, Louisiana, Wilson was an electric blues guitarist and singer who performed Texas blues. He recorded three albums for JSP Records, the first being Boogie Boy: Return of the Texas Tornado.

== Y ==
- Zora Young – Born January 21, 1948, in West Point, Mississippi, Zora Young is a forebear of the Chicago blues scene, being an accomplished soul-blues and Gospel blues singer who has performed with everyone from B.B. King to Buddy Guy and Albert King. She has toured Europe several times and has released many albums for labels such as Delmark Records, Deluge and Black Lightning.

== Z ==
- Tommy Z – Born in Hamburg, New York, Tommy Z is a guitarist, singer, songwriter, record producer and audio engineer, who has released three albums to date. His 2016 album, Blizzard of Blues, debuted at number 8 in the Billboard Billboard Top Blues Albums Chart.
- Rusty Zinn – Born April 3, 1970, in Long Beach, California, Zinn is a West Coast electric blues and reggae guitarist and singer-songwriter. Zinn released six albums between 1996 and 2009, on Black Top, Alligator, Bad Daddy, and 9 Above Records. He has worked with Mark Hummel, Kim Wilson, Larry Taylor, and Sly Dunbar.

== See also ==
- Lists of musicians
