= Damon Fowler =

American songwriter (born 1979)

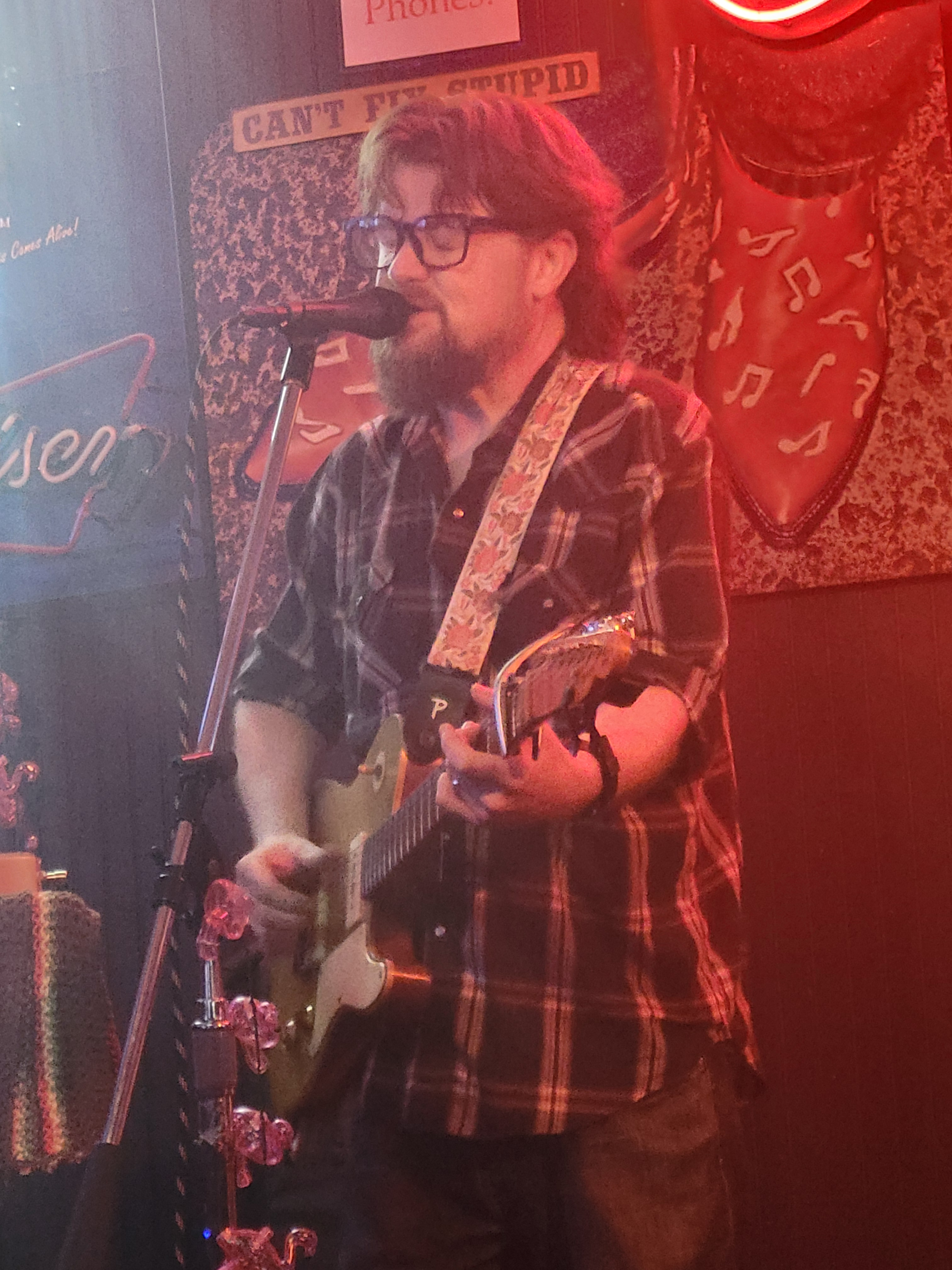
- Damon Fowler playing the Buckingham Blues Bar in Fort Myers, Florida

Background information
- Born: March 16, 1979 (age 47); Brandon, Florida, United States
- Genres: Electric blues, blues rock, soul blues
- Occupations: Singer, guitarist, and songwriter
- Instruments: Vocals, guitar
- Years active: 1990s–present
- Labels: Blind Pig Records, Landslide Records
- Website: damonfowler.com

Damon Fowler (born March 16, 1979) is an American electric blues and blues rock singer, guitarist, and songwriter. Allmusic noted that "his sound is blues based, but there are hints of country, swamp rock, R&B, and swing in his playing and song writing."

== Early life ==
Fowler was born in Brandon, Florida, United States. His first association with the guitar began at the age of twelve, and by experience has expanded his skills and range to include playing acoustic, electric, lap steel, and dobro, incorporating slide techniques.

In his teenage years, Fowler played at small clubs in the Tampa Bay Area. With a growing local reputation, he began to appear as a support act, both on other musicians tours and at music festivals.

== Early recordings ==
Fowler's self released debut album, Riverview Drive (1999), was produced by Rick Derringer, who also played on the album. All nine tracks were written by Fowler.

His next two albums, credited to the Damon Fowler Group, Roots and Branches (2000) and the live album, Skipper's Smokehouse 8/15/03 & 9/7/03 (2003), were also self-released, and were produced by fellow Florida native Greg Marchak.

== Blind Pig Records ==
In March 2007, Blind Pig Records announced the signing of Fowler to a three record deal. His first release with Blind Pig was the largely blues based album, Sugar Shack (2009), produced by Scott Cable. On Sugar Shack, Fowler covers Merle Haggard ("Tonight the Bottle Let Me Down"), Billy Joe Shaver ("I'm Just an Old Chunk Of Coal") & The Amazing Rhythm Aces ("Third Rate Romance"), as well as rerecording his own "Sugar Lee" from Roots and Branches.

Billboard commented that "Fowler may be so skillful that he prefers pickin' tasty to larger-than-life guitar heroics. Fowler wrote nine of the 12 tunes on the album, and his original material is solid." Fowler also performed at Memphis in May in 2009. Following the release of Devil Got His Way two years later, Allmusic remarked that "Fowler's creative lap steel work is what sets him apart from the rest." Devil Got His Way featured a cover of Chuck Prophet's "After the Rain" and Leon Russell's "Tight Rope",

Following an impromptu jam session in July 2011 in Florida, Fowler teamed up with Victor Wainwright, J.P. Soars, Chuck Riley and Chris Peet to form what was to be known as Southern Hospitality. Their first gig was supporting Buddy Guy in August the same year at the Heritage Music Blues Fest in Wheeling, West Virginia. Their debut album, Easy Livin', (2013) was produced by Tab Benoit, and released by Blind Pig Records. It peaked at No. 9 on the US Billboard Top Blues Album chart.

Tab Benoit produced Sounds of Home, which was recorded in Houma, Louisiana, and released on January 21, 2014. The album featured "Old Fools, Bar Stools, and Me", which has gone on to become a staple of Fowler's live sets, as well as covers of Elvis Costello's "Alison", Johnny Winter's "TV Mama" and the African-American slave spiritual, hymn and protest song "I Shall Not Be Moved". In February 2014, Fowler appeared at the Blast Furnace Blues Festival in Bethlehem, Pennsylvania.

== Fowler's Garage ==
With the demise of Blind Pig Records, Fowler self-released Damon Fowler Live 2015. Later that year, he joined Butch Trucks and the Freight Train Band. Following Trucks' death, Fowler was invited to join Dickey Betts Band as the slide guitar player on the 2018 Tour.

In July 2018, He released The Whiskey Bayou Session on Tab Benoit's Whiskey Bayou Records. The Whiskey Bayou Session featured covers of Little Walter's "Up the Line", Johnny Nash's "Hold Me Tight" and the traditional gospel and jazz standard "Just a Closer Walk with Thee".

During the COVID-19 pandemic, Fowler began performing "Fowler's Garage" livestream concerts on his Facebook page and the "Gig Stories" series on his YouTube channel, where he talks with other blues musicians about life on the road.

== Landslide Records ==
On March 26, 2021, Fowler released Alafia Moon, his first album for Landslide Records. The album cover was created by Flournoy Holmes, whose album covers include The Allman Brothers Band's Eat a Peach, as well as albums by Christopher Cross, Charlie Daniels, Ted Nugent, Kansas and many others. It debuted at #1 on the Billboard Blues Chart and was nominated for a Blues Music Award. Shortly afterwards, Big Top Brewing Company, based out of Sarasota, Florida, released "Fowler's IPA" in Fowler's honor. The hazy blood orange hibiscus IPA was released on June 27, to coincide with Fowler playing the brewery as part of its Blues & Brews Sunday concert residency.

His second release for Landslide, credited to Damon Fowler & Friends, was a live album recorded at the Palladium at St. Petersburg. Released on January 20, 2023, the friends on this recording include guests Jason Ricci on harmonica, Dan Signor on keyboards and Eddie Wright on guitar, along with his regular road band, drummer Justin Headley and bassist Chuck Riley.

His third album with Landslide records, Barnyard Smile came out on June 7, 2024. It includes a cover of Bo Diddley's "Road Runner" and Porter Wagoner's "Misery Loves Company". A second album with Southern Hospitality, entitled Yard Sale, came out on December 13, 2024. Fowler wrote or cowrote seven of the eleven tracks on Yard Sale, and sings lead vocals on three.

Other artists Fowler has worked with over the years includes: Gregg Allman, Jeff Beck, Junior Brown, Chris Duarte, Little Feat, Delbert McClinton, George Thorogood, Robin Trower, Jimmie Vaughan, Johnny Winter, Edgar Winter and the Radiators.

== Discography ==
=== Albums ===
Year	Title	Record label(s)	US Top Blues Albums Chart
1999	Riverview Drive	Self released	
2000	Roots and Branches (The Damon Fowler Group)	Self released	
2003	Live at Skipper's Smokehouse (The Damon Fowler Group)	Self released	
2009	Sugar Shack	Blind Pig	12
2011	Devil Got His Way	Blind Pig	
2011	Easy Livin' (with Southern Hospitality)	Blind Pig	9
2014	Sounds of Home	Blind Pig	12
2015	Damon Fowler Live 2015	Self Released	
2018	The Whiskey Bayou Session	Whiskey Bayou Records	
2021	Alafia Moon	Landslide Records	1
2023	Live At The Palladium (Damon Fowler & Friends)	Landslide Records	
2024	Barnyard Smile	Landslide Records	4
2024	Yard Sale (with Southern Hospitality)	Soho Records	

== See also ==
- List of blues rock musicians
- List of soul-blues musicians
- List of electric blues musicians
