= Johnny "Yard Dog" Jones =

American blues musician

- Born: John Junia Jones Jr. June 21, 1941; Crawfordsville, Arkansas, United States
- Died: September 15, 2015 (aged 74) Decatur, Illinois, United States
- Genres: Detroit blues, Chicago blues, soul blues
- Occupation(s): Singer, guitarist, harmonica player, songwriter
- Instrument(s): Lead guitar, harmonica, vocals
- Years active: 1960s–2015
- Labels: Earwig

Johnny "Yard Dog" Jones (June 21, 1941 – September 15, 2015) was an American Chicago blues and soul blues singer, guitarist, harmonica player, and songwriter. He won a W.C. Handy Award in 1998.

Jones played in clubs and on the blues circuit for many years before recording his debut album at the age of 55.

== Life and career ==
John Junia Jones Jr. was born on a cotton plantation in Crawfordsville, Arkansas. He relocated with his family to East St. Louis, Illinois, in 1945. Influenced by Robert Johnson and T-Bone Walker, Jones stated that when he was in his early teens he was given harmonica lessons by Little Walter. At the age of 18, he moved to Chicago and was further inspired by the gospel music recordings of O. V. Wright, Johnnie Taylor and the Spirit of Memphis Quartet. He played the guitar in several gospel groups for over a decade. He adopted the nickname Yard Dog to help him gain more exposure.

Having been trained as a welder, Jones moved to Detroit, Michigan, where he became established as a musician in the local blues scene. In his early days he often performed with Bobo Jenkins. In 1991, he recorded his debut tracks for a Blues Factory compilation album, which also included work by the Butler Twins.

Jones moved back to Chicago, where he was spotted playing by an executive of the Earwig Music Company. His debut album, Ain't Gonna Worry, was released by Earwig in 1996. The Allmusic journalist Scott Yanow noted, "At the age of 55, Johnny Yard Dog Jones finally had the opportunity to lead his first record date in 1996. His singing is likable and full of emotion as he explores a set of music that emphasizes 1950s-style Chicago blues, along with occasional soul ballads". The album contained contributions from Johnny B. Moore and Detroit Junior. It was chosen in a Living Blues critics poll as the Best New Blues Album (Contemporary) in 1996. Jones won a W.C. Handy Award for Best New Blues Artist in 1998.

Jones played at the 1997 Chicago Blues Festival and, with Aron Burton, at the 16th Pocono Blues Festival.

Jones died in Decatur, Illinois, on September 15, 2015, aged 74.

== Discography ==
=== Albums ===
Year	Title	Record label
1996	Ain't Gonna Worry	Earwig

== See also ==
- List of Chicago blues musicians
- List of soul-blues musicians
