= Trudy Lynn =

American actress, singer, dancer (born 1947)

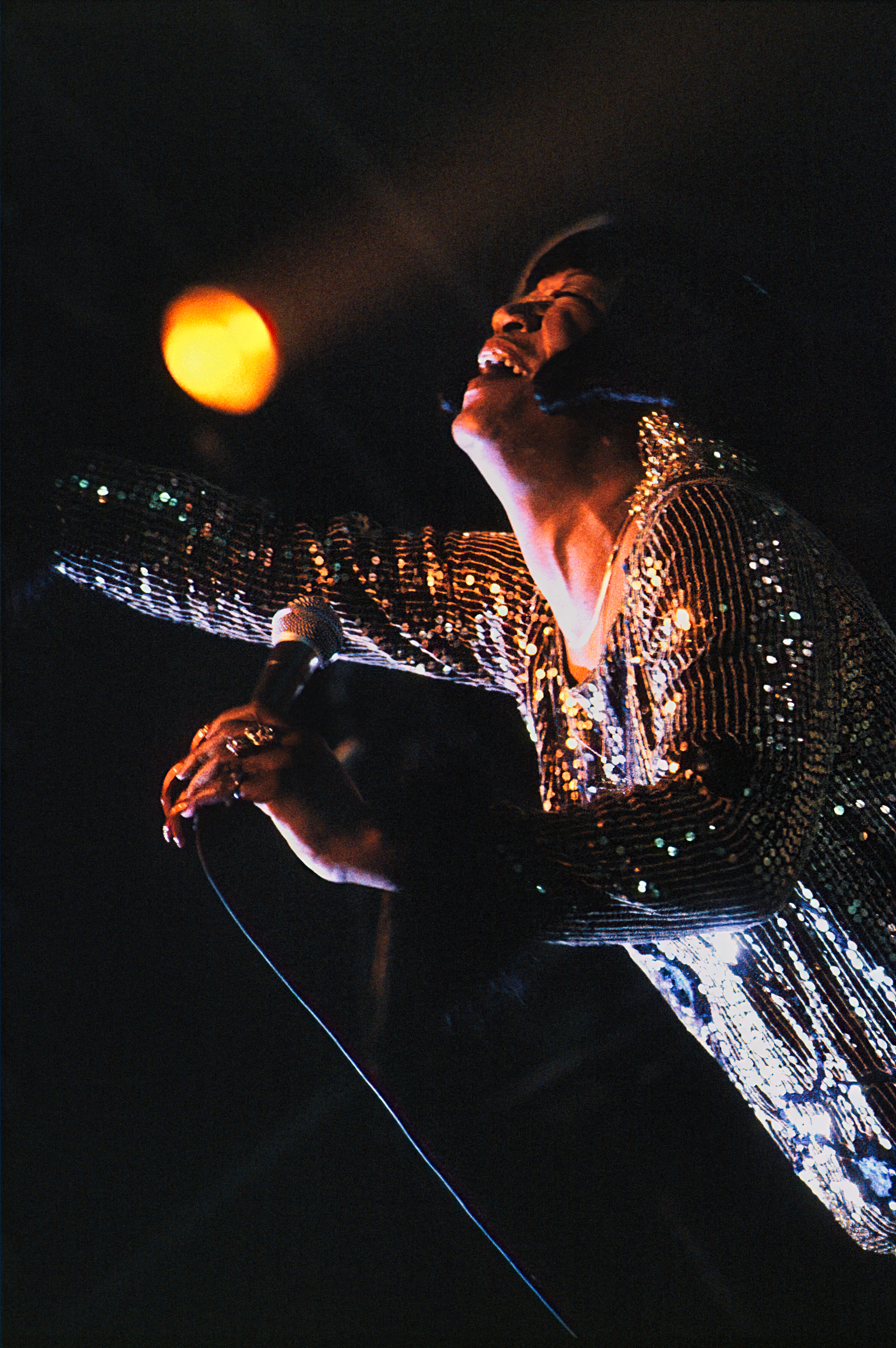
- Lynn in concert at Bagneux, Hauts-de-Seine, Paris, France, at the Bagneux Blues festival of November 1991

Background information
- Born: Lee Audrey Nelms; August 9, 1947 (age 79); Houston, Texas, United States
- Genres: Electric blues, soul blues, soul, R&B
- Occupations: Singer, songwriter
- Instrument: Vocals
- Years active: Mid 1960s–present
- Labels: Nola Blue Records, Ichiban, Ruf, Jus Blues, Isabel, Sawdust Alley, Connor Ray Music

Trudy Lynn (born August 9, 1947) is an American electric blues and soul blues singer and songwriter, whose recorded work has been released on twelve studio albums, one live album, and four compilation albums.

The AllMusic journalist, Alex Henderson, noted that "Lynn isn't one to hold back emotionally; like Koko Taylor and Etta James, she screams, shouts, testifies and gets her points across in a highly convincing way".

== Biography ==
She was born Lee Audrey Nelms in the Fifth Ward, Houston, Texas, United States.

Her professional singing career began in the mid-1960s, when she sang with the guitarist Albert Collins and then later, Clarence Green. Use of her stage name of Trudy Lynn was in place when she performed with the Rhythmaires in the late 1960s. Her early work was in the rhythm and blues genre, and she once opened for Ike & Tina Turner. In the 1970s, Lynn expanded her performing base from clubs in Houston, to regional work and then overseas.

Lynn's recording career did not start until 1989, when Ichiban Records released the first of five albums she recorded for them. Her debut, Trudy Sings the Blues, included her cover version of "Ball 'n' Chain". It reached No. 76 in the US Billboard R&B albums chart. The following year, Come to Mama also peaked at No. 76 in the same chart. A mixture of southern soul and blues, her early albums were produced by Buzz Amato. Her 1999 release, U Don't Know What Time It Is, issued by Ruf Records, was short of double entendres in the lyrics, which had been a trademark up to that time. The album included keyboards input from Lucky Peterson, with Bernard Allison on guitar. Her live album, Blues Power: Trudy's Blues (2004), had guitar work by Carl Weathersby.

One of her most recent outputs was I'm Still Here, released in May 2006. It was recorded with the Calvin Owens Blues Orchestra. I'm Still Here was nominated for a Blues Music Award in 2007 in the 'Best Soul Blues Album' category. Lynn herself was nominated as 'Best Soul Blues Artist'. In 2014, Lynn was nominated for a Blues Music Award in the 'Koko Taylor Award (Traditional Blues Female)' category. Her album, Royal Oaks Blues Cafe, reached number one in the Billboard Top Blues Albums Chart in September 2014.

== Festival work ==
At the Chicago Blues Festival, one newspaper journalist described her as "enthralling", whilst in her home town at the Juneteenth Blues Festival, she was described as the 'Blues Artist of the Year.' Lynn appeared at the Notodden Blues Festival in both 1999 and 2009, and with Little Milton at the San Francisco Blues Festival in 2001. In 2014, she performed at the Lucerne Blues Festival.

== Discography ==
=== Studio albums ===
Year	Title	Record label
1989	Trudy Sings the Blues	Ichiban Records
1990	Come to Mama	Ichiban Records
1991	The Woman in Me	Ichiban Records
1993	I'll Run Your Hurt Away	Ichiban Records
1994	24 Hour Woman	Ichiban Records
1999	U Don't Know What Time It Is	Ruf Records
2002	Memories of You	Jus Blues Records
2006	I'm Still Here	Sawdust Alley Records
2013	Royal Oaks Blues Café feat. Steve Krase	Connor Ray Music
2015	Everything Comes with a Price	Connor Ray Music
2016	I'll Sing the Blues for You	Connor Ray Music
2018	Blues Keep Knockin'	Connor Ray Music
2022	Golden Girl	Nola Blue Records

=== Live albums ===
Year	Title	Record label
2004	Blues Power: Trudy's Blues	Isabel Records

=== Compilation albums ===
Year	Title	Record label
1995	The First Lady of Soul	Ichiban Records
1996	Here Comes Trudy!: The Best of Trudy Lynn	Japan only – import
1998	Retrospectives	Ichiban Records
2002	American Roots: Blues	Ichiban Records

== See also ==
- List of electric blues musicians
- List of soul-blues musicians
