= Calvin Leavy =

American singer

- Born: Calvin James Leavy; April 20, 1940; Scott, Pulaski County, Arkansas, United States
- Died: June 6, 2010 (aged 70) Pine Bluff, Arkansas, United States
- Genres: Soul blues, electric blues
- Occupations: Singer, guitarist
- Instruments: Vocals, guitar
- Years active: Mid-1950s–1990

Calvin Leavy (April 20, 1940 – June 6, 2010) was an American soul-blues and electric blues singer and guitarist. He had a hit single in 1970, when "Cummins Prison Farm" peaked at number 40 on the US Billboard R&B chart and stayed on the chart for five weeks. Locally, it was number one on the chart of radio station WDIA, based in Memphis, Tennessee.

Later in his life, Leavy became the first person indicted under the 1989 Arkansas "drug kingpin law". He died in prison.

== Biography ==
Calvin James Leavy was born in Scott, Pulaski County, Arkansas, the youngest son of fifteen children. As a child he sang in his church choir. By adolescence, he was singing with various gospel ensembles in Little Rock. He formed the Leavy Brothers Band in 1954, and they were popular locally, before relocating to Fresno, California. By the end of 1968, they had moved back to Little Rock and were playing at local clubs. Through this work, Leavy was offered recording time at E&M Studios in Little Rock. The group recorded a cover version of "Tennessee Waltz" and the song "Cummins Prison Farm", written by Bill Cole. Leavy used the prison experiences of one of his brothers to expand the lyrical content. It was originally issued by Soul Beat Records and was subsequently distributed nationally by Blue Fox Records, that label's first release. "Cummins Prison Farm" reached number 40 on the Billboard R&B chart. Recorded in one take, it was one of 27 blues-based songs that reached the R&B chart in 1970.

Leavy recorded further singles for Aquarian, Soul Beat, Downtown and Messenger Records. These included "Nothing but Your Love", "Give Me a Love (That I Can Feel)" and "Goin’ to the Dogs Pt. 1". The band also made some recordings for the Arkansas Bicentennial Blues Project, which are archived at the University of Arkansas at Little Rock. They also appeared in 1977 at the Beale Street Music Festival, before disbanding. Forming Calvin Leavy and the Professionals, he and his new band remained popular locally. They recorded "Is It Worth All (That I'm Going Through)", "Big Four", "What Kind of Love", "Free from Cummins Prison Farm", and "If Life Last Luck Is Bound to Change". Further national chart success eluded him, but he maintained a strong fan base in the South, and his records often appeared on local jukeboxes.

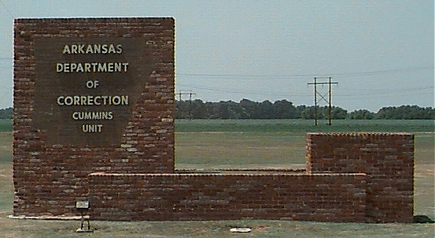
Cummins Prison, the inspiration for Leavy's only national hit record and later his residence

In 1991, Leavy was charged with making payments to an undercover police officer and was convicted of multiple drug-related offences in July 1992. He was sentenced to life plus twenty-five years. His imprisonment started at Cummins Prison. By 2004, his sentence was commuted to seventy-five years.

Leavy died in June 2010, at the age of 70, in the Jefferson Regional Medical Center in Pine Bluff, Arkansas. He would have been eligible for parole in eighteen months.

== Discography ==
=== Compilation albums ===
Year	Title	Record label
2000	The Best of Calvin Leavy	TAM
2003	Cummins Prison Farm	P-Vine

== See also ==
- List of electric blues musicians
- List of soul-blues musicians
