= Tutu Jones =

American guitarist, singer and songwriter

- Born: John Jones Jr. September 9, 1966 (age 60); Dallas, Texas, United States
- Genres: Electric blues, soul blues, country blues
- Occupations: Guitarist, singer, songwriter
- Instruments: Guitar, vocals, drums
- Years active: 1970s–present
- Labels: JSP, Rounder, Doc Blues, CD Baby
- Website: http://www.tutujones.com/bio.html

Tutu Jones (born September 9, 1966) is an American electric blues and soul blues guitarist, singer and songwriter. He has cited Freddie King and Z. Z. Hill as influences on his playing style. Since 1994, Jones has released five albums.

== Life and career ==
John Jones Jr. was born in Dallas, Texas, United States, the son of a Dallas-based R&B guitarist, Johnny B. Jones. Through his father's work, he was introduced to house guests such as Freddie King, L. C. Clark, Ernie Johnson and Little Joe Blue. Jones began playing the guitar by the age of five, by which time he had acquired his nickname Tutu from his father.

He began his career in adolescence, as a drummer, graduating from backing his uncles Barefoot Miller and L. C. Clark (the latter in 1976) to working with Z. Z. Hill and R. L. Burnside.

Meanwhile, working on his own guitar playing, by 1989 Jones had moved on to fronting his own bands. This led to the recording of his debut album, I'm For Real, on JSP Records in 1994. It was nominated for a W. C. Handy Award. Blues Texas Soul followed two years later, and Staying Power in 1998.

A live album, Tutu Jones Live, was issued in 2005 by Doc Blues Records. A journalist at the Austin Chronicle then stated, "bluesmen are traditionalists, but Jones learns how to mesh soulful wails with syrupy blues that are as sweaty live as they are in quiet studios."

His album Inside Out was released by CD Baby in 2009.

== Discography ==
Year	Title	Record label
1994	I'm For Real	JSP
1996	Texas Blues Soul	Rounder
1998	Staying Power	Rounder
2005	Tutu Jones Live	Doc Blues
2009	Inside Out	CD Baby

== See also ==
- List of country blues musicians
- List of electric blues musicians
- List of soul-blues musicians
- List of Texas blues musicians
