= Andrew "Jr. Boy" Jones =

American guitarist, singer and songwriter

- Born: Andrew Bennie Jones, Jr. October 16, 1948 (age 77); Dallas, Texas, United States
- Genres: Texas blues, electric blues, soul-blues
- Occupation(s): Guitarist, singer, songwriter
- Instrument: Guitar
- Years active: Late 1960s–present
- Labels: JSP, Rounder, Galexc, 43rd Big Idea, Electro-Fi

Andrew "Jr. Boy" Jones (né Andrew Bennie Jones, Jr.; born October 16, 1948) is an American Texas blues guitarist, singer and songwriter, whose recorded work has been released on five albums. In 1995, he was also part of the ensemble that garnered a Blues Music Award as the 'Band of the Year'.

One commentator noted that Jones' 1997 album, I Need Time, "showcases his crafty songwriting, great guitar playing, and powerful singing."

== Biography ==
Andrew Bennie Jones, Jr., was born in Dallas, Texas, to Andrew Bennie Jones, Sr. (1918–2010), and Gladys Scott Booker (maiden; 1917–2007). Gladys, in the 1940s, had been a singer with big bands that included the Southern Swingsters led by Adolphus Sneed (1915–2009), a saxophonist. But Gladys stopped when Andrew was born. Jones acquired his moniker from his grandmother. Jones learned to play the guitar at a young age, and he joined Freddie King's backing band, the Thunderbirds, at the age of seventeen and toured with them for a couple of years. In 1967, Jones became part of Bobby Patterson's backing band, the Mustangs, playing on a number of Patterson's single releases. By the early 1970s, Jones had regular work in Dallas backing many musicians, plus he was tutored further in his guitar playing by Cornell Dupree.

In 1973, Jones re-joined King's backing ensemble, and played with him until King died in 1976. The latter part of the decade saw Jones create a soul group known as the Creators, who signed a recording contract with RCA Records. Penned by Jones, their 1979 single, "Blame It on Me", was more successful on the Northern soul circuit in the UK than in his home country. He worked locally in the early 1980s, primarily backing R.L. Griffin and Hal Harris, before finding regular work with Johnnie Taylor until 1985. In late 1987, he went to California joining Bobby Bland's drummer, Tony Coleman, and B.B. King's bassist, Russell Jackson, and played as the Silent Partners, who backed Katie Webster both in concert and on her Swamp Boogie Queen (1988) album. The trio became session musicians working with Charlie Musselwhite, with whom Jones remained until 1996. Jones toured the world in this period, and played on three Musselwhite albums; Ace of Harps (1990), Signature (1991), and In My Time (1993).

In 1997, Jones issued his debut solo album, I Need Time, via JSP Records. This was followed the year after by Watch What You Say (Rounder Records), although that label association soon finished. However, following Watch What You Say's release, Jones was nominated for a Blues Music Award for 'Best New Blues Artist'. A live album, Jr. Boy Live was released in 2006 and Gettin' Real, a more recent release appeared on the independent record label, Electro-Fi Records in 2009.

He recently opined his frustration of not being more widely recognised. "I’d have to say that I’ve been close to certain things all my life. Been right there [where the action was]. Maybe, there have been some bad decisions on my part. Maybe, I haven't sucked up enough or to the right people."

== Discography ==
Year	Title	Record label
1997	I Need Time	JSP Records
1998	Watch What You Say	Rounder Records
2001	Mr Domestic	Galexc Records
2006	Jr. Boy Live	43rd Big Idea Records
2009	Gettin' Real	Electro-Fi Records
2012	I Know What It's Like	43rd Big Idea Records
2013	Ready To Play	Grounds For Thought Records

== See also ==
- List of Texas blues musicians
- List of electric blues musicians
- List of soul-blues musicians
