= Jay Owens (musician) =

American singer

- Born: Isaac Jerome Owens; September 6, 1947; Lake City, Florida, United States
- Died: November 26, 2005 (aged 58) Orlando, Florida, United States
- Genres: Electric blues, soul blues
- Occupations: Guitarist, singer, songwriter
- Instruments: Guitar, vocals
- Years active: 1960s–2005
- Labels: Atlantic, EastWest

Jay Owens (September 6, 1947 – November 26, 2005) was a blind African-American electric blues and soul blues guitarist, singer and songwriter.

== Life and career ==
Isaac Jerome Owens was born in Lake City, Florida, United States. His mother was a minister in a local church, where Owens first learned to sing. He learned to appreciate blues from an uncle of his. Having obtained his first guitar, Owens was playing music professionally by the time he left high school.

Owens played alongside his friend, Johnny Kay, in the 1970s and 1980s, leading a succession of bands playing in the Tampa Bay and St. Petersberg area of Florida. In such a role he supported many other musicians such as O. V. Wright, Al Green, Stevie Wonder, Donny Hathaway, Aaron Neville and Little Milton.

Mike Vernon produced Owens' debut solo album, The Blues Soul of Jay Owens, which was released on Atlantic Records in 1993, and featured Pete Wingfield playing keyboards It won Living Blues magazine's 'Best Blues Album' and 'Best Debut Album' awards. In 1995, EastWest issued Movin' On, which included contributions as before from Vernon and Wingfield, while Dave Bronze played bass guitar on the collection.

He was also a prolific songwriter, and his songs have been recorded by Jim Leverton ("Only Human"), James Booker ("1-2-3" and "One Hell of a Nerve"), and K. T. Oslin ("Come On-A My House").

In 1997, Owens moved to Orlando, Florida after spending twenty years in New York City.

Owens died at his home in Orlando, at the age of 58, from complications of diabetes in November 2005.

== Discography ==
Year	Title	Record label
1993	The Blues Soul of Jay Owens	Atlantic
1995	Movin' On	EastWest

== See also ==
- List of electric blues musicians
- List of soul-blues musicians
