= Johnny Rawls =

American singer

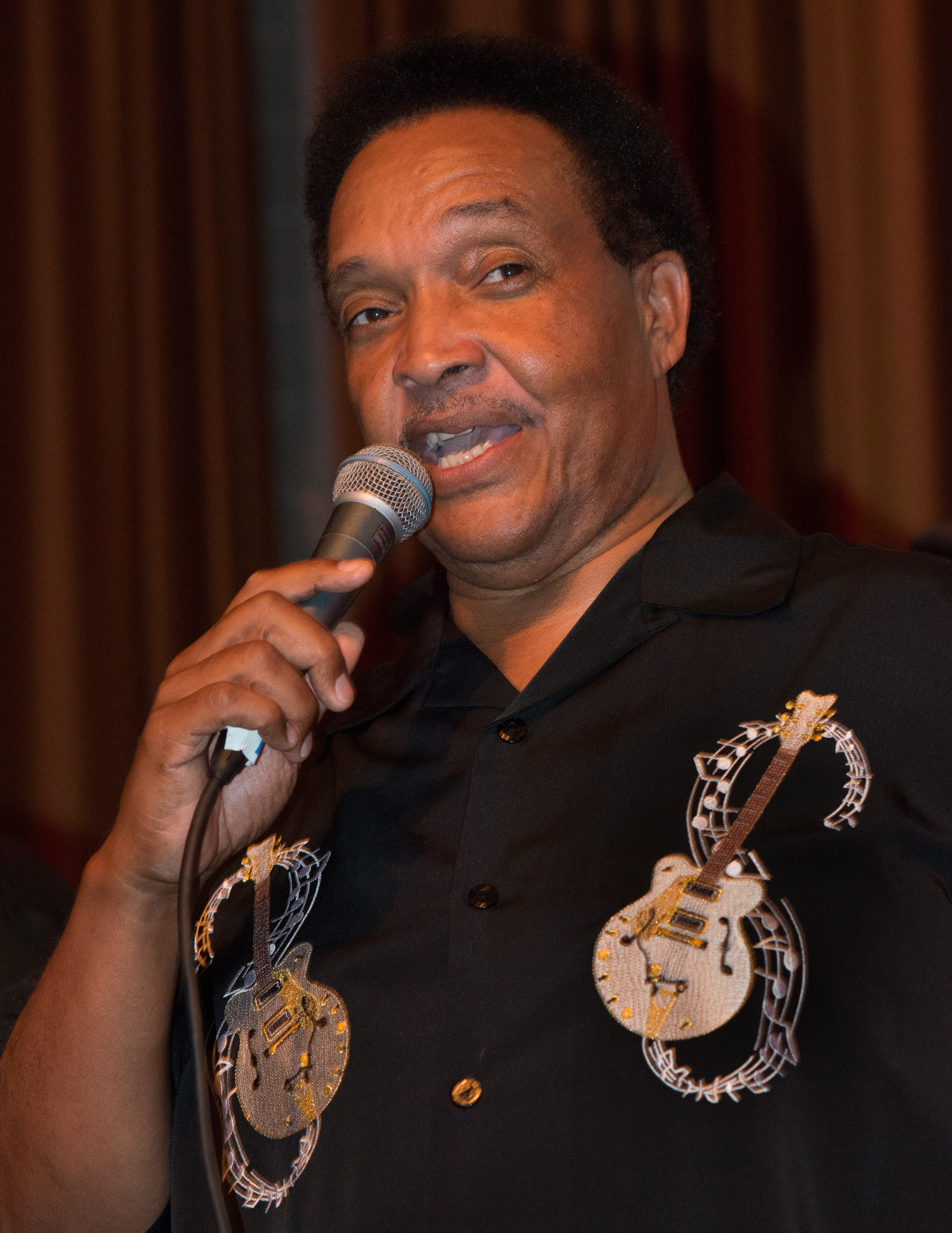
- Rawls in 2015

Background information
- Born: September 10, 1951 (age 75); Hattiesburg, Mississippi, U.S.
- Origin: Purvis, Mississippi
- Genre: Soul blues
- Occupations: Singer, guitarist, arranger, songwriter, record producer
- Instruments: Guitar, vocals
- Years active: 1970s–present
- Labels: Catfood Records, various
- Website: www.johnnyrawlsblues.com

Johnny Rawls (born September 10, 1951) is an American soul blues singer, guitarist, arranger, songwriter, and record producer. He was influenced by the deep soul and gospel music of the 1960s, as performed by O. V. Wright, James Carr, and Z. Z. Hill, although his styling, production and lyrics are more contemporary in nature.

Rawls has released more than 20 albums under his name. He has been nominated many times for a Blues Music Award, and at the 40th Blues Music Awards ceremony, Rawls' album, I'm Still Around, was named as the 'Soul Blues Album of the Year'.

== Life and career ==
Rawls was born in Hattiesburg, Mississippi. (Note: Some sources cite Columbia, Mississippi, as Rawls' birthplace.) He was taught the rudiments of guitar playing by his blind grandfather, and also played the saxophone and clarinet in high school in Purvis, Mississippi. Having mastered guitar playing by his mid teens, Rawls' schoolteacher arranged for him to back musicians who were touring through Mississippi, such as Z. Z. Hill and Joe Tex. In the mid 1970s, Rawls joined O. V. Wright's backing band, became his music director and played together with Wright until the latter's death in 1980. The band then continued billed as the Ace of Spades Band for another 13 years, and toured and performed with other musicians over this time span. These included B.B. King, Little Milton, Bobby Bland, Little Johnny Taylor, and Blues Boy Willie. The band included the guitarist L.C. Luckett, and he and Rawls jointly released two albums including the 1994 album, Can't Sleep at Night, on Rooster Blues.Rawls also produced and played guitars on Willie Cobbs 1995 album ‘Down To Earth’.

His debut solo album, Here We Go, was released on JSP in 1996. The Allmusic journalist, Thom Owens, noted, "Rawls has a powerful, soulful voice which can make mediocre material sound convincing." Rawls also worked as an arranger and record producer for JSP. Further JSP releases included Louisiana Woman (1997), My Turn to Win (1999), and Put Your Trust in Me (2001), although by the time the latter was issued, Rawls had set up his own label, Deep South Soul. Rawls appeared on the cover of the Living Blues magazine in April 2002, where he was described as "a soul-blues renaissance man". The 2005 release No Boundaries, on Catfood Records increased his profile.

His 2006 album Heart & Soul, was nominated for a Blues Music Award for 'Best Soul Blues Album of the Year'. In the same year, the West Coast Blues Hall of Fame named him 'Best Vocalist'. Rawls has performed several times at the Chicago Blues Festival and regularly at music festivals each year in the US and Canada. He has toured Europe on many occasions as well as in Japan and Australia. Red Cadillac (2008), Ace of Spades (2010) and Memphis Still Got Soul (2012) all won the Critics Choice Award for Best Album of the Year in Living Blues. He has also been honored, along with Little Milton and Tyrone Davis, with a Blues Trail Marker in Hattiesburg. The title song of Rawls 2009 album, Ace of Spades, was a tribute to his one time mentor, O. V. Wright. The album also garnered Rawls with his first Blues Music Award for 'Best Soul Blues Album of the Year'.

Rawls album Memphis Still Got Soul, was released in April 2011, his fourth album for Catfood Records. It was nominated for 2012 Blues Music Award for Soul Album of the Year, the title song for Song of the Year and Rawls for Male Soul Artist of the Year, his third nomination in that category. With a further reference to Wright, the album's track listing included Rawls cover of the song "Blind, Crippled and Crazy", which was originally associated with Wright. His 2012 release, Soul Survivor, included another Wright song, "Eight Men Four Women". It was nominated for Soul Blues Album of the Year and Rawls was again nominated for Male Soul Artist of the Year at the 2013 Blues Music Awards. His 2013 release on Catfood Records, Remembering O.V., a tribute to O.V. Wright, featured Otis Clay as a special guest. Remembering O. V. was nominated for 2014 Soul Album of the Year and Rawls for Male Soul Artist of the Year, his 11th and 12th Blues Music Awards nominations.

In 2019, Rawls moved to Ohio's Third Street Cigar Records and since recorded four albums for the label, including I Miss Otis Clay (2019), Where Have All The Soul Men Gone (2020) and Going Back To Mississippi (2022). At the 40th Blues Music Awards ceremony in 2019, Rawls' first album for Third Street, I'm Still Around (2018), was named as the 'Soul Blues Album of the Year'.

As a songwriter he is credited on more than 100 recordings. Rawls undertook co-production duties on all of his albums issued on Catfood Records, as well as on Barbara Carr's Keep The Fire Burning.

== Discography ==
=== Albums ===
| Year | Title | Record label | Notes |
|---|---|---|---|
| 1989 | You're The One | Touch | with L C Luckett |
| 1994 | Can't Sleep at Night | Rooster Blues | with L C Luckett |
| 1995 | Down to Earth | Rooster Blues | with Willie Cobbs |
| 1996 | Here We Go | JSP Records | |
| 1997 | Louisiana Woman | JSP Records | |
| 1999 | My Turn to Win | JSP Records | |
| 2001 | Put Your Trust in Me | JSP Records | |
| 2002 | Lucky Man | Deep South Soul | |
| 2002 | Get Up & Go | JSP Records | Compilation album |
| 2004 | Partners & Friends | Rock House Records | with Roy Roberts |
| 2004 | Live in Montana | Deep South Soul | Live album |
| 2005 | No Boundaries | Topcat Records/Catfood Records | |
| 2006 | Heart & Soul | Deep South Soul | |
| 2008 | Red Cadillac | Catfood Records | |
| 2009 | Ace of Spades | Catfood Records | |
| 2011 | Memphis Still Got Soul | Catfood Records | |
| 2012 | Soul Survivor | Catfood Records | |
| 2013 | Remembering O. V. | Catfood Records | with special guest Otis Clay |
| 2014 | Soul Brothers | Catfood Records | with Otis Clay |
| 2016 | Tiger in a Cage | Catfood Records | |
| 2018 | I'm Still Around | Third Street Cigar Records | |
| 2019 | I Miss Otis Clay | Third Street Cigar Records | |
| 2020 | Where Have All The Soul Men Gone | Third Street Cigar Records | |
| 2020 | Live in Europe | Continental Blue Heaven | Live album |
| 2021 | Best of Johnny Rawls Vol. 1 | Catfood Records | Compilation album |
| 2022 | Going Back To Mississippi | Third Street Cigar Records | |
| 2023 | Walking Heart Attack | Catfood Records | |
| 2025 | Make Them Dance | Catfood Records | |
| 2026 | Tribute to Soul | Third Street Cigar Records | with Dave Keller |

== See also ==
- List of soul-blues musicians
