= Albert Castiglia =

American singer-songwriter

- Born: August 12, 1969 (age 56); New York City, United States
- Genres: Electric blues
- Occupations: Singer, songwriter, guitarist
- Instruments: Guitar, vocals
- Years active: 1990–present
- Label: Various including Ruf Records
- Website: Official website

Albert Castiglia (born August 12, 1969) is an American blues singer, songwriter and guitarist. Castiglia has variously worked alongside Junior Wells, Sandra Hall, Aron Burton, Pinetop Perkins, Melvin Taylor, Sugar Blue, Phil Guy, Ronnie Earl, Billy Boy Arnold, Ronnie Baker Brooks, John Primer, Lurrie Bell, Jerry Portnoy, Larry McCray, Eddy Clearwater and Otis Clay.

AllMusic noted that "Castiglia combines hardcore blues with soul, rock, and country flavors for a sound that will appeal to rockers and blues purists alike." His vocal style has been compared to that of Van Morrison.

== Life and career ==
Castiglia (pronounced "ka-steel-ya") was born in New York City, United States, to a Cuban mother and an Italian father. He moved with his family to Miami, Florida, when he was five years old and commenced learning the guitar seven years later.

Castiglia joined the Miami Blues Authority in 1990 and was named the 'best blues guitarist in Miami' by the Miami New Times in 1997. Following a college education, Castiglia worked for four years for the state of Florida as a social services investigator. Discovered singing by Junior Wells in 1996, he joined his touring band and worked as Wells' lead guitarist until the latter's death in 1998. By now living in Chicago, Illinois, Castiglia found work with Sandra Hall and toured with himself until the end of the century. In 2002, Castiglia joined David Shelley in the Alligator Alley Allstars, a "blues and roots super group" at Alligator Alley, a "Native Florida" restaurant and live music venue (named for the nearby swamp highway).

His first solo work, Burn, was self-released in 2004, followed in 2006 with The Bittersweet Sessions, where he collaborated with Graham Wood Drout. The New Jersey–based Blues Leaf Records then issued Castiglia's 2006 album, A Stone's Throw. It contained his versions of the Junior Wells song, "Hoodoo Man Blues" and The Shadows' "The Rise and Fall of Flingle Bunt". In April 2008, These Are the Days was released, which included Castiglia's tribute to his former employer Junior Wells called "Godfather of the Blues", as well as cover versions of Bob Dylan's "Catfish", Nappy Brown's "Night Time Is the Right Time", Fenton Robinson's "Somebody Loan Me a Dime", and Little Willie John's track "Need Your Love So Bad". These Are the Days saw Castiglia get a nomination for a Blues Music Award for his self-penned song, "Bad Year Blues." He continued to tour and supported both ZZ Top and Elvin Bishop.

Keepin On (2010), recorded in Dover, New Jersey, featured five tracks written by Castiglia, plus covers of songs by John Lee Hooker ("Goin' Upstairs"), Mack Rice ("Cadillac Assembly Line"), T-Bone Walker ("My Baby is Now On My Mind"), Peter Green ("I Could Not Ask for More"), Robert Nighthawk ("Murderin' Blues") and Bob Dylan ("Till I Fell In Love With You"). Living the Dream (2012), included contributions on Hammond B3 organ and piano from John Ginty. Roots Music Report bestowed him with the Top Blues Album Award for 2011 and 2012. In December 2013, Castiglia performed at the Bradenton Blues Festival.

In March 2014, Castiglia signed a recording contract with Ruf Records. His seventh album in all and his first on Ruf Records was Solid Ground, which was recorded in Glen Ridge, New Jersey. It contained the Lefty Dizz-penned track "Bad Avenue", Castiglia's version of the blues standard, "Goin' Down Slow", and a cover of the Rolling Stones, "Sway". Solid Ground peaked at number 10 in the US Billboard Top Blues Albums chart.

In 2015, Castiglia made a guest appearance on John Ginty's albums, Bad News Travels and the subsequent Bad News Travels (Live).

In May 2020, Castiglia won a Blues Music Award in the 'Blues Rock Album of the Year' category for his album, Masterpiece. In 2023, he won two Blues Music Awards as 'Blues Rock Artist of the Year' and 'Blues Rock Album of the Year' for I Got Love.

== Discography ==
=== Albums ===
Year	Title	Record label
2002	Burn	Self-released
2006	The Bittersweet Sessions	Self released
2006	A Stone's Throw	Blues Leaf Records
2008	These Are the Days	Blues Leaf Records
2010	Keepin On	Blues Leaf Records
2012	Living the Dream	Blues Leaf Records
2014	Solid Ground	Ruf Records
2015	Blues Caravan 2014	Ruf Records
2016	Big Dog	Ruf Records
2017	Up All Night	Ruf Records
2019	Masterpiece	Gulf Coast Records/Select-O-Hits
2020	Wild And Free	Gulf Coast Records
2022	I Got Love	Gulf Coast Records
2024	Righteous Souls	Gulf Coast Records
2026	Grits & Glory	Gulf Coast Records

== See also ==
- List of electric blues musicians
