= Lynn White =

Lynn White may refer to:

- Lynn Townsend White Jr., American historian of technology and college president
- Lynn White (musician), American soul blues singer and songwriter
