= Preston Shannon =

American singer

- Born: October 23, 1947; Olive Branch, Mississippi, United States
- Origin: Memphis, Tennessee, United States
- Died: January 22, 2018 (aged 70) Memphis, Tennessee, U.S.
- Genres: Electric blues, soul blues
- Occupation(s): Guitarist, singer, songwriter
- Instrument(s): Guitar, vocals
- Years active: 1980s–2018
- Website: Official website

Preston Shannon (October 23, 1947 – January 22, 2018) was an American electric blues and soul blues guitarist, singer and songwriter.

AllMusic noted that "Shannon's specialty is a blend of Southern-fried soul and blues, and his albums and live shows – always with a horn section – are an eclectic mix of danceable, grooving tunes and slow, soulful ballads". Among the songs he wrote are "Beale Street Boogaloo" and "Midnight in Memphis".

== Life and career ==
He was born in Olive Branch, Mississippi, and relocated with his family to nearby Memphis, Tennessee, at the age of eight. Despite initial misgiving from his Pentecostal parents, Shannon developed an interest in the blues and played part-time with several local bands, while his daytime occupation was with a hardware firm. He began a full-time musical career when he secured a spot in Shirley Brown's backing ensemble.

In 1993, his own Preston Shannon Band played at the Long Beach Blues Festival in Long Beach, California. After being spotted leading his own band in Memphis' Beale Street clubs, he signed to Rounder Records subsidiary, Bullseye Blues, and released his debut solo effort, Break the Ice in 1994. After this followed the Willie Mitchell produced efforts, Midnight in Memphis (1996) and All in Time (1999). However, with no immediate follow-up available, Preston lost momentum. After moving to Title Tunes, he released Be with Me Tonight (2006).

Shannon played at Memphis in May in both 2008 and 2011. In February 2012, Shannon appeared on season two of The Voice, singing "In the Midnight Hour".

He was a regular performer at B.B. King's Blues Club in Memphis. Shannon's final studio recorded album was Dust My Broom (2014).

== Death ==
Preston died of cancer on January 22, 2018, in Memphis, Tennessee, at the age of 70.

== Discography ==
=== Albums ===
Year	Title	Record label
1994	Break the Ice	Bullseye Blues
1996	Midnight in Memphis	Bullseye Blues
1999	All in Time	Bullseye Blues
2006	Be with Me Tonight	Title Tunes
2011	Goin' Back to Memphis	Continental Blue Heaven
2014	Dust My Broom	Continental Blue Heaven

=== Singles ===
Year	Title	Record label
1999	"Tired of the Ghetto Bringing Me Down"	Bullseye Blues

== See also ==
- List of electric blues musicians
- List of soul-blues musicians
