= L.V. Johnson =

American blues guitarist, singer and songwriter (1946–1994)

- Born: December 25, 1946; Chicago, Illinois, United States
- Died: November 22, 1994 (aged 47); Chicago, Illinois, United States
- Genres: Chicago blues, electric blues, soul-blues, soul, rhythm and blues
- Occupations: Guitarist, singer, songwriter
- Instruments: Guitar, vocals
- Years active: Mid 1960s–1994
- Label: Various

L.V. Johnson (December 25, 1946 – November 22, 1994) was an American Chicago blues and soul-blues guitarist, singer and songwriter. He is best known for his renditions of "Don't Cha Mess with My Money, My Honey or My Woman" and "Recipe". He worked with the Soul Children, the Bar-Keys and Johnnie Taylor. Songs he wrote were recorded by Tyrone Davis, Bobby Bland and the Dells. He was the nephew of Elmore James.

== Biography ==
Johnson was born in Chicago, Illinois, and learned to play the guitar from B.B. King.

He was employed by Stax Records as a session musician and played on recordings by the Bar-Kays, Johnnie Taylor, and the Soul Children. His songs "Are You Serious" and "True Love Is Hard to Find" were hit singles for Tyrone Davis. His song "Country Love" was recorded by Bobby Bland. The Dells reached the Billboard chart with their version of Johnson's "Give Your Baby a Standing Ovation".

Johnson was Davis's accompanist until embarking on a modest solo career in the early 1980s. He recorded for ICA, Phono, and Ichiban Records, but without much commercial success. He was also a co-owner of a steakhouse and nightclub in Chicago.

Johnson died of undisclosed causes in Chicago in November 1994, at the age of 47.

His 1981 song "I Don't Really Care" was sampled by J. Dilla on "Airworks" on Dilla's 2006 album, Donuts. The same track was sampled by Madlib and used in "Chittlins & Pepsi" by Strong Arm Steady (featuring Planet Asia), on Strong Arm Steady's 2010 album, In Search of Stoney Jackson.

== Discography ==
=== Albums ===
- We Belong Together (Phono Records, 1981)
- All Night Party (Sunnyview Records, 1986)
- I Really Don't Care (1987)
- Cold & Mean (Ichiban, 1989)
- I Got the Touch (Ichiban, 1991)
- Unclassified (Ichiban, 1992)

== See also ==
- List of Chicago blues musicians
- List of soul-blues musicians
- List of soul musicians
