= Michael Coleman (blues musician) =

American songwriter

- Born: June 24, 1956; Chicago, Illinois, United States
- Died: November 2, 2014 (aged 58)
- Genres: Chicago blues, electric blues, soul blues, funk, soul
- Occupations: Musician, singer, songwriter
- Instruments: Guitar, vocals
- Years active: Mid 1970s–2014
- Label: Delmark

Michael Coleman (June 24, 1956 – November 2, 2014) was a Chicago blues guitarist, singer, and songwriter. He was voted one of the top 50 bluesmen in the world by Guitar World magazine. He released five solo albums and worked with James Cotton, Aron Burton, Junior Wells, John Primer and Malik Yusef.

== Biography ==
Coleman was born in 1956 in Chicago, Illinois. He began his musical career at a young age, playing alongside his father, Cleother "Baldhead Pete" Williams. As a teenager he played with the Top 40 showband Midnight Sun and with the blues musicians Aron Burton and Johnny Dollar on Chicago's North Side. In 1975 he became a full-time professional musician. He toured Europe with Eddy Clearwater four years later. This led to work for James Cotton, in whose band Coleman played for almost ten years. Coleman backed Cotton on three albums, including Live from Chicago: Mr. Superharp Himself, released by Alligator Records.

Coleman backed Junior Wells, Buster Benton, and Jimmy Dawkins and also worked with Syl Johnson in the 1980s. He embarked on a solo career in the early 1990s. His 1987 song "Woman Loves a Woman" contained a controversial lyric, in which he confessed he was in love with a woman, but "She's in love with a woman too". Coleman formed the Backbreakers as his backing ensemble in 1991. His album Shake Your Booty was released by the Austrian label Wolf Records in 1995.

His U.S. debut album was Do Your Thing!, issued by Delmark Records in 2000. It featured a mixture of material encompassing blues, soul and funk, with cover versions of songs previously recorded by Jimmy Reed, Otis Redding and Isaac Hayes. It was noted that the quality of his guitar playing compensated for a lightweight vocal accompaniment.

In 2006, Coleman led a group of Delmark musicians on the album Blues Brunch at the Mart.

Coleman was overweight and had diabetes, which severely affected his health. His doctor advised a change in lifestyle, and Coleman subsequently lost 150 pounds. He started his 2010 Chicago Blues Tour by performing at Rosa's Lounge in Chicago.

Coleman died in November 2014, aged 58.

== Discography ==
=== Albums ===
Year	Title	Record label
1990	Back Breaking Blues (Chicago Blues Sessions Vol. 18)	Wolf (Austria)
1995	Self-Rising Blues	SAAR (Italy)
1995	Shake Your Booty	Wolf Records (Austria)
1997	You Can't Take What I Got	SAAR (Italy)
2000	Do Your Thing!	Delmark
2002	Chicago Blues Festival 1991	Black & Blue
2006	Blues Brunch at the Mart	Delmark
2008	Harmony Mill	Minefield

=== Selected work with other musicians ===
- High Compression, James Cotton (1984)
- Live from Chicago Mr. Superharp Himself, James Cotton (1986)
- Harp Attack!, James Cotton (1990)
- Poor Man Blues, John Primer (1991)
- The Great Chicago Fire: A Cold Day in Hell, Malik Yusef (2003)
- "Wouldn't You Like to Ride", Malik Yusef (2005)

== See also ==
- List of Chicago blues musicians
- List of electric blues musicians
- List of soul-blues musicians
