= Drink Small =

American blues guitarist, singer, and songwriter

- Also known as: The Blues Doctor
- Born: January 28, 1933 (age 93); Bishopville, South Carolina, U.S.
- Origin: Columbia, South Carolina, U.S.
- Genres: Electric blues, soul blues, gospel
- Occupations: Musician, singer, songwriter
- Instruments: Guitar, keyboards, vocals
- Years active: 1955–present
- Labels: Ichiban, Mapleshade, Southland, others

Drink Small (born January 28, 1933) is an American soul blues and electric blues guitarist, pianist, singer, and songwriter. He is known as The Blues Doctor and has been influenced by a variety of musical styles including gospel and country music.

== Early life ==
Drink Small (his real name) was born in Bishopville, South Carolina into a family of singers and musicians, who were also sharecroppers working in cotton fields. His mother was Alice "Missie" Small and his father was Arthur Jackson; they never married. There is no story or significance behind his name. He attended a two-room schoolhouse as a child. He taught himself to play the guitar around the age of six or seven, originally learning on his uncle's one-string guitar. He made a guitar as a child, cutting up an old inner tube for strings. Also at an early age, he learned to play an old pump organ that was in his home.

At the age of eight, he was thrown from and caught under the moving wheel of a mule-drawn wagon and suffered a severe back injury. He wore a makeshift body cast for weeks, which ended his days picking cotton and helped turn him towards his musical path by listening to the radio and learning to play the songs on the guitar. Later in his youth he organized a local gospel group, the Six Stars. During high school he sang in the school glee club and with a quartet, as well as in his church. Around this time he also began to perform with a professional gospel group, the Golden Five.

== Career ==
After high school, he attended the Denmark Area Trade School in South Carolina, studying barbering. On weekends when he returned home from school, he and the Golden Five would perform at house parties. He found playing music at night and cutting hair all day to be difficult, so he quit barbering and began to play music full time. In 1955, he moved to Columbia, South Carolina to play guitar with gospel group The Spiritualaires. That group's performances included a show at the Apollo Theater in Harlem and an appearance on the Shirley Caesar Caravan television show. The group toured with singer Sam Cooke as well as The Staple Singers and The Harmonizing Four. Sister Rosetta Tharpe once invited Small to be her permanent guitar player.

His first recording was a single with The Spiritualaires in 1956, on Vee-Jay Records.

Small had eclectic musical influences, including Tennessee Ernie Ford, Merle Travis, John Lee Hooker, Fats Domino and the blues guitarist and singer Blind Boy Fuller. He also watched diverse musical shows on television, including Soul Train and The Lawrence Welk Show from which he drew musical inspiration. His musical style has been described as "drawn from the Piedmont blues tradition but also includes gospel, rhythm and blues, boogie-woogie, and Delta and Chicago style of blues".

He was considered one of the best guitarists in gospel music in the 1950s, before he turned his attention to secular music later in that decade. His transition to playing the blues full-time was aided by his fan base from the gospel music world. In 1959, he recorded the single "I Love You Alberta", released by Sharp Records.

With a mastery of multiple styles of music, a basso profondo blues voice, and a charismatic stage presence that includes telling bawdy stories and jokes onstage, in the 1960s he began to gain a following with college students in the Carolinas. He performed his blues at almost every institution of higher learning in South Carolina, along with frequent appearances at nightclubs, roadhouses, and blues clubs throughout the state.

Over the course of his long career, Small wrote hundreds of songs and recorded occasionally for small record labels, issuing six albums between 1990 and 2008. He started his own record label, Bishopville Records, in the 1970s. He recorded dirty blues tracks, such as "Tittie Man" and "Baby, Leave Your Panties Home", and more righteous songs, such as "The Lord Been Good to Me".

Small has toured nationally and internationally, including performances at well-known festivals such as the Chicago Blues Festival and the King Biscuit Blues Festival, as well as at three international World's fairs. He was the opening act for Little Milton, Bobby "Blue" Bland, and Koko Taylor, and was once on the same bill as Furry Lewis and Johnny Shines. Small performed at the 2005 New Orleans Jazz & Heritage Festival and at the first Julius Daniels Memorial Blues Festival in Denmark, South Carolina, in October 2010. In 2009, Small was the closing act of the first Pee Dee Blues Bash, held in Florence, South Carolina.

In February 2010, Small was one of several South Carolina musicians featured in the episode "Juke Joints and Honky Tonks" of the television documentary series Carolina Stories.

As of 2015, he was featured weekly on Blues Moon Radio, broadcast on WUSC-FM from Columbia, South Carolina.

== Personal life ==
He is married to Andrina Small.

His favorite guitar is named Geraldine.

He moved to Columbia, South Carolina in 1955, bringing his mother with him. Although he toured across the U.S. and in Europe, Small has a fear of flying and preferred to perform close to home, where he cared for his mother. She died in 1988.

He never made enough money solely from his music career, so he required outside income. He sometimes sold fishing worms out of his backyard between musical gigs. He was quoted as saying "Rich people got the blues because they are trying to keep the money, poor people got the blues because they are trying to get some money, and Drink Small got the blues because I ain't got no money."

His well-known brief, pithy rhymes and life aphorisms have been called "Drinkisms".

He lost his eyesight in 2014.

== Discography ==
=== Albums ===
Year	Title	Record label
1970s	Drink Small	Southland
1976	I Know My Blues Are Different	Southland (Select-O-Hits)
1988 (re-released in 2006)	Blues Doctor: Live & Outrageous!	Erwin
1990	The Blues Doctor	Ichiban
1991	Round Two	Ichiban
1994	Electric Blues Doctor Live	Mapleshade
2003	Does It All	Bishopville
2008	Tryin' to Survive at 75	Bishopville
2010	Hallelujah Boogaloo	Music Maker

=== Singles ===
Year	Title	Record label
unknown	"Atlanta Georgia is a Little New York, part 1" / "Atlanta Georgia is a Little New York, part 2"	Bishopville
1959	"I Love You Alberta" / "Cold Cold Rain"	Sharp
1987	"I'm Gonna Shag My Blues Away" / "I'm In Love with a Grandma"	Bishopville
1990	"Tittie Man" / "Rub My Belly"	Ichiban

== Awards and honors ==
- Small's 1988 album Blues Doctor: Live & Outrageous was nominated for a W.C. Handy Award
- 1990: Jean Laney Harris Folk Heritage Award, which represents South Carolina's highest honor for lifetime achievement in the traditional arts
- July 1992: featured on the cover of Living Blues magazine
- 1999: inducted into the South Carolina Music and Entertainment Hall of Fame
- 2001: inducted into the South Carolina Black Hall of Fame
- 2012: his song "Living in a BBQ World" was named as the official song of the South Carolina Festival of Discovery
- 2013: Bobby "Blue" Bland Ambassador for the Blues Award from the Jus' Blues Foundation
- 2015: National Heritage Fellowship awarded by the National Endowment for the Arts, which is the United States government's highest honor in the folk and traditional arts
- 2015: Mayor Stephen K. Benjamin proclaimed July 30, 2015 as "Drink Small Day" in Columbia, South Carolina, which has become an annual celebration
- 2018: Small's likeness was featured on a mural in the Five Points neighborhood of Columbia, South Carolina
- 2023: Drink Small Day celebrated February 4, 2023 at the South Carolina State Museum to commemorate Small's 90th birthday; the musician performed at the event

== See also ==
- List of electric blues musicians
- List of soul-blues musicians
