= Larry Hamilton (musician) =

American singer

- Born: Larry James Hamilton; March 23, 1951; Galveston, Texas, United States
- Origin: Gretna, Louisiana, United States
- Died: December 28, 2011 (aged 60)
- Genres: New Orleans blues, rhythm and blues, soul blues
- Occupations: Singer, songwriter
- Instruments: Vocals, bass guitar
- Years active: 1965–present

Larry James Hamilton (March 23, 1951 – December 28, 2011) was an American New Orleans blues, rhythm-and-blues and soul blues singer and songwriter. He was a professional musician since the mid-1960s, but his solo debut album was released only in 1997.

== Biography ==
Hamilton was born in Galveston, Texas, United States and brought up in New Orleans, Louisiana. He learned to play drums and piano and to sing by the age of nine and had written his first song by the age of 12. Three years later, in 1965, he began his professional career as lead singer with David Batiste and the Gladiators. His career there lasted until the mid-1970s, during which time he toured with Curtis Mayfield, Bettye Swann, Jackie Wilson, Percy Sledge, David Ruffin, Major Lance, Z. Z. Hill and Al Green. In his own name, Hamilton recorded two singles on Malaco Records, "Gossip" backed with "Keep the News to Yourself" (1971), and "My Mind Keeps Playing Tricks on Me" backed with "Ain't Nothing Like That Funky Music".

His songwriting credits include "Get on Your Job", recorded by Etta James; "Feel Like Dynamite" and "Let Us Be", recorded by King Floyd; "She's Taking My Part", recorded by Irma Thomas; and "The Feeling", recorded by Albert King. He also wrote songs for Oliver Morgan ("I Love Rhythm and Blues"); Jean Knight ("Save the Last Kiss for Me"); and Johnny Adams ("More Than One Way").

Hamilton met Allen Toussaint in the late 1970s and accompanied his group on tour. In 1996, Toussaint signed Hamilton to his NYNO Records label, releasing Larry Hamilton in 1997. Hamilton's second album, Love Is?, was released in September 2006.

Hamilton died in December 2011, aged 60.

== Discography ==
Album title	Record label	Year of release
Larry Hamilton	Valley Entertainment	1997
Love Is?	LJH Records	2006

== See also ==
- List of New Orleans blues musicians
- New Orleans rhythm and blues
