= Krissy Matthews =

British-Norwegian musician (born 25 May 1992)

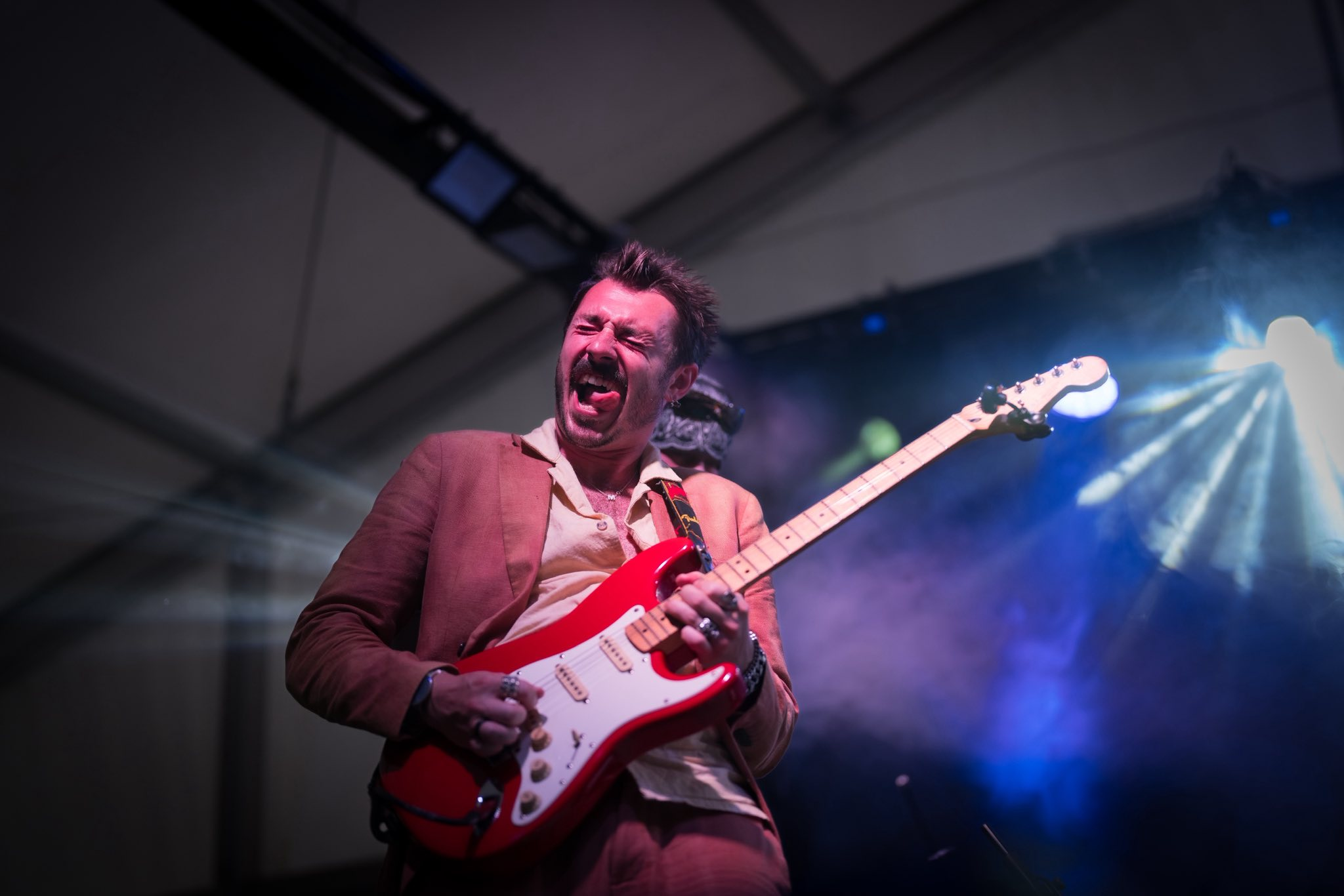
- Matthews in 2025

Background information
- Born: 25 May 1992 (age 34); Oxford, UK
- Origin: Oxford, UK
- Genres: Electric blues, blues rock
- Occupations: Singer-songwriter, guitarist
- Instruments: Vocals, guitar
- Years active: 2004–present
- Label: Ruf Records
- Website: Official website

Krissy Matthews (born 25 May 1992) is a British-Norwegian blues rock singer-songwriter and guitarist. He had released three albums by the age of 18. His most recent and eleventh album, Rock and Roll Soldier, was released by Ruf Records in April 2026.

== Discography ==
=== Albums ===
Year	Title	Record label
2006	Blues Boy	Via Music
2007	No Age Limit	Self release
2009	Allen in Reverse	Mammi Productions
2011	Hit the Rock	Big Lake Records
2015	Scenes From a Moving Window	Promise Records
2017	Live at Freak Valley	Rock Freaks
2019	Monster In Me	MIG
2021	Pizza Man Blues	Ruf Records
2022	Live at Rockpalast 2019	MIG
2024	Krissy Matthews and Friends	Ruf Records
2026	Rock and Roll Soldier	Ruf Records

== See also ==
- List of electric blues musicians
