= The Butler Twins =

American blues duo

- Born: Clarence C. Butler; Curtis Butler Jr. January 21, 1942; Killen, Alabama, United States
- Died: Clarence Butler: December 22, 2003 (aged 61); Hamtramck, Michigan, U.S. Curtis Butler: April 9, 2004 (aged 62); Hamtramck, Michigan, U.S.
- Genres: Detroit blues, electric blues
- Instruments: Guitar, harmonica, vocals
- Years active: Early 1960s–2003
- Label: JSP Records

The Butler Twins were an American Detroit blues and electric blues duo of the twin brothers Clarence (January 21, 1942 – December 22, 2003) and Curtis Butler (January 21, 1942 – April 9, 2004). Longtime semiprofessional performers in the local blues scene in Detroit, they gained international recognition following the recording of three albums in the late 1990s. Their best-known track was "The Butler's Boogie".

== Biography ==
Clarence and Curtis Butler were born seconds apart, in Killen, and grew up in nearby Florence, Alabama. Their father, Willie "Butch" Butler, was noteworthy as a local guitar player, and with his harmonica playing partner, Raymond Edwards, both proved useful tutors. By the age of seven the twins were proficient enough musicians to win a talent contest, and played in the abandoned house where W. C. Handy once lived. They were in the middle of a family of sixteen siblings, and the twins put together their first musical ensemble at the age of 14, and two years later started to tour the Southern United States.

They relocated to Detroit in 1960 and worked in automobile assembly plants. By night they were part of the local nightclub scene. Clarence Butler supplied harmonica and vocals, while Curtis Butler played rhythm guitar, and they sat in with other musicians, until the local blues scene faded away in the late 1960s. In the early 1980s, with the Butler Twins still in residence, they were lauded as blues survivors.

JSP Records, based in London, issued two albums by the Butler Twins: Not Gonna Worry About Tomorrow (May 1995) and Pursue Your Dreams (May 1996). The relative success led to tours across the United States, Canada and Europe. The Twins, as they became known among blues fans, became more famous overseas than in their own country. In 2000, the Detroit Music Awards gave the Outstanding Blues Writer award to Clarence Butler.

The Butler Twins were granted Music Achiever status by the Alabama Music Hall of Fame.

Clarence Butler died after a heart attack on December 22, 2003, in Hamtramck, Michigan. Curtis Butler died just over three months later, on April 9, 2004.

== Discography ==
- Not Gonna Worry About Tomorrow (1995), JSP
- Pursue Your Dreams (1996), JSP
- The Butler's Boogie (2000), live album, Orchard

== See also ==
- List of Detroit blues musicians
- List of electric blues musicians
