= Matt Hill (musician) =

American singer

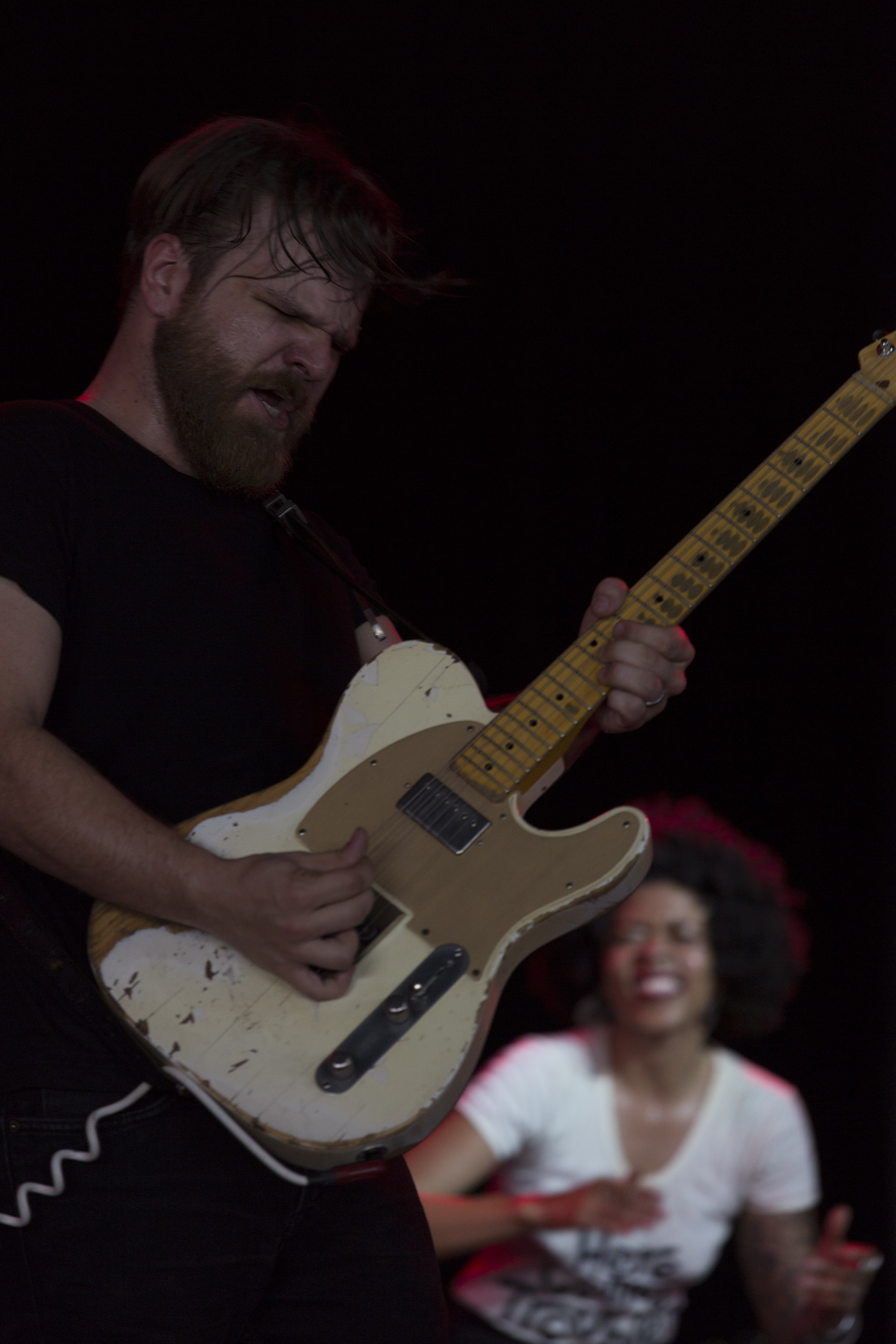
- April 2015

Background information
- Born: June 17, 1985 (age 41); Rocky Mount, North Carolina, United States
- Genres: Electric blues, rock and roll
- Occupations: Singer, guitarist, songwriter
- Instruments: Electric guitar, bass guitar, lap steel guitar, vocals
- Years active: 2000s–present

Matt Hill (born June 17, 1985) is an American electric blues singer, guitarist and songwriter. To date, Hill has released two albums, and he has also gained a reputation for his energetic live performances.

Hill won a Blues Music Award in May 2011, in the category of 'Best New Artist Debut' for his first album, On the Floor.

== Life and musical career ==
Hill was born in Rocky Mount, North Carolina, United States. Originally inspired by his uncle's listening choice of Creedence Clearwater Revival, Hill had learned to play the guitar by his mid-teens. He met the drummer Chuck Cotton at a local blues gig, and impressed by the fact that Cotton had played alongside Bob Margolin, they jointly started a band, which ended up competing at the 2005 International Blues Challenge in Memphis, Tennessee.

After playing in another couple of bands, Hill joined Margolin on tour, which saw Hill meet fellow blues musicians including Carey Bell, Hubert Sumlin, Pinetop Perkins and Nappy Brown. Along with his playing experience, Hill slowly nurtured a raucous on-stage presence, partly inspired by Howlin' Wolf, Jerry Lee Lewis and Nappy Brown. Hill commented "I've been obsessed with Jerry Lee since I was a kid, and when I saw Nappy Brown crawlin' around, taking his clothes off, well I thought, this is for me!"

Matt Hill's 2010 debut album was entitled On the Floor, partly attributable to his stage antics. The collection, produced by Margolin and Dave Gross, contained eleven Hill originals among the 14 tracks. AllMusic noted that "Why the F*ck (Do You Think I Cuss)," written by Margolin, had "Hill's screaming vocals and a thick twang-heavy bass solo make it the album's stand-out track". In May 2011, it garnered Hill the 'Best New Artist Debut' gong at the Blues Music Awards. Hill was later nominated in two categories at the Blues Blast Music Awards in Chicago, Illinois.

In 2011, he married the singer Nikki Hill, and they relocated to St. Louis, Missouri. His follow-up album, Tappin' That Thang, was issued on May 29, 2012. Months after the release of Tappin' That Thang, Hill began playing alongside his wife and singer Nikki Hill.

In October 2014, Matt Hill and the Deep Fryed Two's last performance was at the Daytona Blues Festival. In October and November that same year, Hill toured Western Europe with his wife.

== Discography ==
Year	Title	Record label	Accreditation
2010	On the Floor	Deep Fryed Records / Vizztone Records	Matt Hill
2012	Tappin' That Thang	Deep Fryed Records / Vizztone Records	Matt Hill and the Deep Fryed Two

== See also ==
- List of electric blues musicians
