= Lynn White (musician) =

American singer

- Born: August 6, 1953 (age 72); Mobile, Alabama, United States
- Genres: Soul blues, electric blues
- Occupation(s): Singer, songwriter
- Instrument: Vocals
- Years active: Late 1970–Late 1990s
- Labels: Various including Waylo Records

Lynn White (born August 6, 1953) is an American soul blues singer and songwriter. Between 1978 and 2006, she released fourteen albums, three compilation albums, and numerous singles. Her best known song is "I Don't Ever Wanna See Your Face Again" (1982). White had a subtle dulcet voice when compared to her contemporaries harsher tones.

== Life and career ==
White was born in Mobile, Alabama, United States. She started singing in her local church aged six, and launched her professional career in the late 1970s. In her teens, White had a part-time job at a record store and sang along to whatever record was playing. She was promoted to become the store manager when its owner, Ike Darby, realised her singing potential. Her debut single was 1978's "Pains In My Heart" on Darby Records. "I Didn't Make My Move Too Soon" followed, before recording her debut album, Am I Too Much Woman For You, basically a collection of her single releases to that point, which was issued in 1981. White's 1982 single "I Don't Ever Wanna See Your Face Again" was heard by the record producer Willie Mitchell, and he reissued the cut on his own Waylo Records. Her next album, Blues in My Bedroom, was released the same year on Waylo, and she remained with that label for the rest of the 1980s. White released seven albums on Waylo, including Love & Happiness, which contained the modern sounding, mid-tempo number, "See You Later, Bye".

In 1990, White moved on and formed her own label which issued The New Me that year. At her creative peak in the early to mid-1990s, she started to write some of her material, such as "Draw The Line" on The New Me. Further independent albums such as Home Girl (1991) and Cheatin' (1993) ensued, with White getting executive producer credits on the latter. Her 12" single, "I Don't Know Why", became a notable track on the UK modern soul scene. White's work during this period was an influence on Syleena Johnson, and White cut a duet with Willie Clayton, a medley of "Slow and Easy" / "Take Me to the Mountain". In September 1994, White supported Little Milton in concert in Chicago, Illinois. Two further low key albums were issued in the mid to late-1990s, before White seemingly stopped recording and performing.

Two compilation discs, 1996's At Her Best and 2001's More of the Best, contained selections of her most popular work.

== Personal life ==
She became married to Ike Darby and, in 1987, they relocated to Memphis, Tennessee. Darby died on September 6, 1988.

== Discography ==
=== Albums ===
Year	Title	Record label
1981	Am I Too Much Woman For You	Darby Records
1982	Blues in My Bedroom	Waylo Records
1985	Sorry	Waylo Records
1985	Slow & Easy	Waylo Records
1987	Success	Waylo Records
1987	Yes I'm Ready	Waylo Records
1987	That's How Strong My Love Is	Panarecord International
1989	Love & Happiness	Waylo Records
1990	Blues	Waylo Records
1990	The New Me	S.O.H. Distributors Network
1991	Home Girl	Creative Funk Records
1993	Cheatin'	S.O.H. Distributors Network
1995	Take Your Time	MMS Records
1998	Touching Me	BLT Records

=== Compilation albums ===
Year	Title	Record label
1996	At Her Best	Blues Works
2001	More of the Best	Blues Works
2006	Greatest Hits	Blues Works

== See also ==
- List of soul-blues musicians
- List of electric blues musicians
