= List of soul-blues musicians =

The following is a list of soul blues musicians.

- Johnny Adams
- Peggy Scott-Adams
- Kip Anderson
- James Armstrong
- Reneé Austin
- L.V. Banks
- Jo Jo Benson
- Buster Benton
- Bobby Bland
- Blues Boy Willie
- Ronnie Baker Brooks
- Michael Burks
- Jimmy Burns
- Barbara Carr
- Annika Chambers
- Otis Clay
- Willie Clayton
- Gary B.B. Coleman
- Michael Coleman
- Shemekia Copeland
- Larry Davis
- Johnny Drummer
- Carol Fran
- Frank Frost
- Earl Gaines
- Sandra Hall
- Larry Hamilton
- Ted Hawkins
- Z. Z. Hill
- The Holmes Brothers
- Ellis Hooks
- Etta James
- George Ezra
- L.V. Johnson
- Andrew "Jr. Boy" Jones
- Johnny "Yard Dog" Jones
- Tutu Jones
- Albert King
- B.B. King
- Little Jimmy King
- Eddie Kirkland
- Denise LaSalle
- Benny Latimore
- Calvin Leavy
- Bonnie Lee
- Frankie Lee
- Trudy Lynn
- J.J. Malone
- Jimmy McCracklin
- Little Milton
- McKinley Mitchell
- Willie Mitchell
- Sugar Ray Norcia
- Darrell Nulisch
- Jay Owens
- Junior Parker
- Ann Peebles
- Johnny Rawls
- A.C. Reed
- Tad Robinson
- Bobby Rush
- Oliver Sain
- Marvin Sease
- Preston Shannon
- Drink Small
- Alexis P. Suter
- Johnnie Taylor
- Koko Taylor
- Little Johnny Taylor
- Ike Turner
- Robert Ward
- Walter "Wolfman" Washington
- Lavelle White
- Lynn White
- Lee "Shot" Williams
- Big Daddy Wilson
- Zora Young

== See also ==
- List of gospel blues musicians
