= Sandra Hall =

American singer

- Also known as: Atlanta's "Empress of the Blues"
- Born: September 5, 1951 (age 74); Oakland City, Atlanta, Georgia, United States
- Genres: Blues, soul blues
- Occupations: Singer, songwriter
- Instrument: Vocals
- Years active: 1960s-present
- Label: Various including Ichiban
- Website: facebook.com/sandrahallblues/

Sandra L. Hall (born September 5, 1951) is an American blues and soul blues singer and songwriter. She has been billed as Atlanta's "Empress of the Blues" Hall is an Honorary Member of the Atlanta Blues Society. To date she has released five albums, including three on Ichiban Records.

== Life and career ==
Hall was born in Oakland City, Atlanta, Georgia, United States. After singing from the age of four at a nearby church, Hall formed a duo with her sister, Barbara, called the Soul Sisters. She later formed the Exotics, singing and dancing particularly at the Royal Peacock Club, one of the premier Atlanta nightclubs. The Exotics opened for several touring acts at that venue, including Otis Redding, Joe Tex and the Temptations. By the late 1960s, Hall had trained as a nurse, supplementing her income by working variously as a singer, go-go dancer and stripper. She also raised her daughter during this time.

She continued singing in a semi-professional vein, while working full-time as a nurse. She developed her stage act to include a risque repertoire which was ripe with innuendo. Her better known songs included "Big Long Slidin' Thing ," "One Drop Will Do You," and "Pump Up Your Love". Hall's live work came to the attention of Ichiban Records and, in 1995, they released her debut solo album, Showin' Off. The same year she appeared at the Sarasota Blues Fest. Hall continued to work largely around Atlanta, but her recording exposure led her on tours in Europe, which included her performing at the Montreux Jazz Festival. Her second album, One Drop Will Do You, was issued in 1997. The Allmusic journalist, Alex Henderson, noted that One Drop Will Do You "isn't an innovative or groundbreaking album, but it's certainly a very satisfying and inspired one".

In 2001, she self-released Miss Red Riding Hood. Hall performed at the W.C. Handy Blues and Barbecue Festival in 2005. As well as continuing to perform and record, she befriended Shemekia Copeland and gave guidance in her early career, and Hall regularly visits schools teaching blues culture and singing styles. Hall continues to perform at Blind Willie's in Atlanta. In 2011, Hall appeared at the Julius Daniels Memorial Blues Festival.

== Discography ==
=== Albums ===
Year	Title	Record label	Notes
1995	Showin' Off	Ichiban	
1997	One Drop Will Do You	Ichiban	
2001	Miss Red Riding Hood	Self-released	
2002	American Roots : Blues	Ichiban	Compilation album
2007	Red Bone Woman	Slang Records	Sandra Hall & Gnola Blues Band

== See also ==
- Music of Atlanta
- List of blues musicians
- List of soul-blues musicians
