= Spirit of Memphis Quartet =

The Spirit of Memphis Quartet was one of the great gospel quartets of the 1950s.
