= JSP Records =

British record label

- Founded: 1978
- Founder: John Stedman
- Genre: Blues, jazz
- Country of origin: UK
- Location: London, England
- Official website: www.jsprecords.com

JSP Records is a British record label, founded in 1978 by John Stedman (John Stedman Promotions), releasing recordings by blues musicians such as Professor Longhair, Buddy Guy, Jimmy Witherspoon, Louisiana Red, Deitra Farr, Charlie Sayles, Eddie "Cleanhead" Vinson, Kansas City Red, Eddie Taylor, and Big John Wrencher. The label is based in London, England.

JSP now predominantly releases remastered CDs of public domain jazz and blues recordings. In the case of old Paramount recordings (including those by Charley Patton and Blind Blake), the original records were made from shellac which made them susceptible to damage. JSP's releases from this material are remastered versions.

Their release of Louis Armstrong's Hot Fives & Sevens is often considered to be one of the most essential jazz releases available.

The label has an extensive catalog of original recordings, but their recording program continues to this day, with Lucky Peterson, Johnnie Marshall, Randy McAllister, and other contemporary artists.

Concerts have also been promoted at concert halls such as The New London Theatre, The Collegiate Theatre and at the 100 Club. Several American musicians were brought to the UK for concerts and tours, including rhythm and blues artists such as Roy Brown, Jimmy McCracklin, Bob Kirkpatrick, Charles Brown and Professor Longhair. Some musicians 'discovered' by JSP have since moved to larger labels, for example Larry Garner, Guitar Shorty, Chris Beard, Lil' Dave Thompson, Tutu Jones and Andrew "Jr. Boy" Jones.

== See also ==
- Lists of record labels
