= Soul blues =

Style of blues music

- Stylistic origins: Electric blues; soul; rhythm and blues
- Cultural origins: 1950s, United States

Soul blues is a style of blues music developed in the late 1960s and early 1970s that combines elements of soul music and urban contemporary music.

== Origin ==
American singers and musicians who grew up listening to the electric blues by artists such as Muddy Waters, Jimmy Reed, and Elmore James, and soul singers such as Sam Cooke, Ray Charles and Otis Redding fused blues and soul music. Bobby Bland was one of the pioneers of this style.

== See also ==
- List of soul-blues musicians
- Soul music
- Blues
- R&B
- Gospel music
- Doo wop
- Funk
