= John Primer =

American singer and guitarist (born 1945)

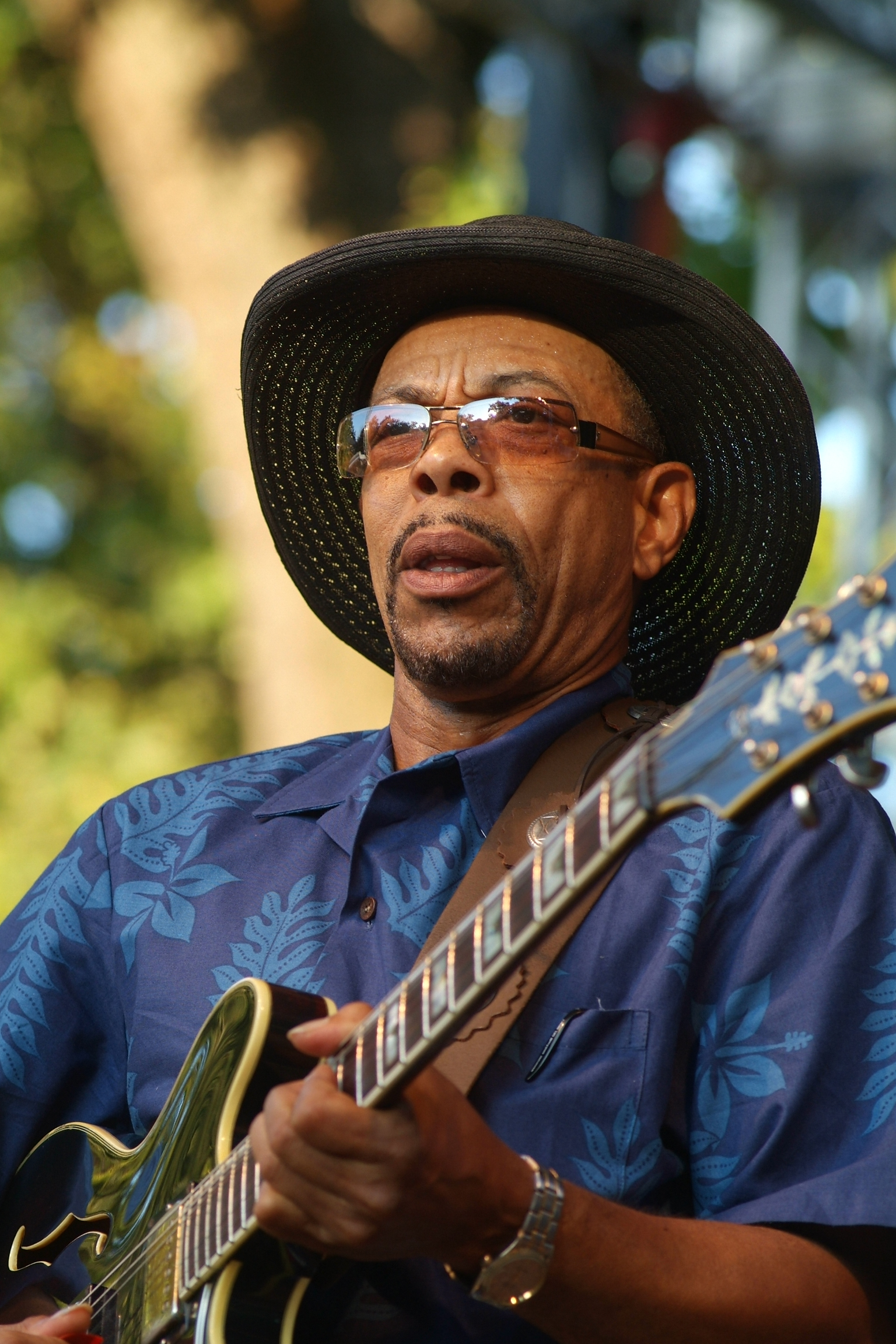

Background information
- Born: March 5, 1945 (age 81); Camden, Mississippi, U.S.
- Genres: Chicago blues, soul-blues, electric blues
- Occupations: Singer, guitarist, songwriter
- Instruments: Vocals, guitar
- Years active: 1960s-present
- Label: Blues House Productions
- Website: johnprimerblues.com

John Primer (born March 5, 1945, Camden, Mississippi, United States) is an American Chicago blues and electric blues singer and guitarist who played behind Junior Wells in the house band at Theresa's Lounge and as a member of the bands of Willie Dixon, Muddy Waters and Magic Slim before launching an award-winning career as a front man, carrying forward the traditional Windy City sound into the 21st century.

== Biography ==
=== Childhood ===
Born into a family of Mississippi sharecroppers, Primer grew up imbued with a strong work ethic from his forebears and in a farming community that was deeply involved in the blues tradition, singing work songs in the field during the week and spirituals in church on Sundays. Living on the Mansell Plantation in rural Madison County, he lived in a shack with no running water and a leaking roof with his large, extended family. He shared a bed with cousins, and lost his father at age 22 after a truck accident when he was four years old.

He fell in love with the blues in infancy when his father and an elder cousin played guitar and sang at night after a hard day in the fields. His mother subsequently moved to Chicago in order to secure a job and support her family. She promised to bring John and his sister to the big city when they reached age 18, leaving them with family. Depressed and lonely, young Primer frequently went into the neighboring woods, where he cried his troubles away and began singing the blues in solitude. He eventually built himself a diddley bow on the side of his grandmother's house out of broom wire, two nails and a brick and began accompanying himself as he sang, eventually playing for dimes and quarters in his schoolyard. After listening to Jimmy Reed, Little Milton, B.B. King, Albert King and Muddy Waters on his grandmother's record player, his biggest dream was to play alongside Muddy Waters one day.

=== Early years in Chicago ===
Setting his sights on his dream and with a Harmony guitar in hand, Primer relocated to Chicago in 1963 when he reached 18, just as his mother had promised. He eventually started learning his trade by playing for tips at the legendary Maxwell Street market alongside blues superstars and raw beginners like himself. He eventually landed his first regular gig, joining with Pat Rushing—one of the most iconic performers in the neighborhood—to form The Maintainers and play on Sundays. The band eventually started booking gigs in small bars and clubs on the city's West Side, most prominently The Bow Tie, Lover's Lounge and The Place. In 1968, he left Rushing to join the soul/R&B group, The Brotherhood Band, where he served as front man and began developing the unique singing style he is known for today.

=== Sideman with the greats ===
In 1974, he started playing seven nights a week as a member of the house band at Theresa's, the South Side club, learning how to play slide guitar from bandmate and former Muddy sideman Sammy Lawhorn and backing harmonica player Junior Wells, who regularly fronted the unit when off the road, as well as Magic Sam, James Cotton, Magic Slim and others. After seeing him in action at Theresa's, Willie Dixon invited Primer to join his Chicago Blues All-Stars in 1979, touring with him internationally for a year, during which he honed his skills as a slide guitarist, vocalist and songwriter.

Primer's childhood dream came true in 1980, when Muddy Waters formed a new band after the departure of his old unit, which rebranded themselves as the Legendary Blues Band. In addition to serving as Waters' guitarist, he immediately assumed responsibilities as Muddy's bandleader and opening act. Primer held the position until Waters' passing in 1983, during which he received additional training on the six-string and Muddy instilled in him the importance of maintaining the old-school blues tradition. His lengthy recording career as a sideman began as a member of the Waters band in 1980 with Blues Deluxe, a compilation recorded live by radio station WXRT-FM at Navy Pier. He recorded with Muddy and the Rolling Stones at Buddy Guy's Checkerboard Lounge in 1981, a concert that was eventually released as an award-winning DVD. He began sitting in at jams at the Checkerboard in that era, eventually spent two decades as the band leader for Monday night jams, where he began passing on his skills to a younger group of musicians. He maintained the position until 2001, when the original nightclub closed its doors for the final time.

Following Waters' death, Primer also joined Magic Slim's band, The Teardrops, eventually becoming its band leader and teaming on rhythm guitar with Slim's bassist brother, Nick Holt, to create what became as known as the "lump de lump" cadence pattern that became dominant in the Chicago blues sound. During the 13 years Primer spent at Slim's side, the band won contemporary album of the year honors in the Blues Music Awards on three occasions and received two nominations as band of the year.

=== Solo career ===
Primer made his recording debut as front man with Poor Man's Blues for Wolf Records, the Austria-based label that was also Magic Slim's longtime home. Stuff You Got to Watch on Earwig Records followed in 1991 with a lineup that included Holt on bass and Mervyn "Harmonica" Hinds on harmonica and The Real Deal on Code Blue/Atlantic four years later with backing from harp player Billy Branch, bassist Johnny B. Gayden and keyboard player David Maxwell, among others. The CD earned him a 1997 W.C. Handy Award nomination for traditional album of the year. In 2007, the composer, producer and author Larry Hoffman was commissioned by the Chicago Sinfonietta Orchestra to compose "Three Songs for Bluesman and Orchestra", an orchestral setting of three songs by Primer, who sang and improvised, fronting the orchestra under the direction of Paul Freeman. The work premiered at the Dominican University on May 11, 2008, and was repeated the next evening at Chicago's Symphony Center. Primer has subsequently enjoyed an enduring relationship with Wolf Records as well as his own Blues House Productions imprint, which was founded in 2008. Primer is a 2017 inductee into the Chicago Blues Hall of Fame, a lifetime achievement award nominee from the Mississippi Valley Blues Society and the Pennsylvania Blues Society. His musicianship and recordings have earned two Grammy Award nominations and dozens of awards and nominations from Blues Music Awards, Blues Blast Music Awards and Living Blues magazine.

== Discography ==
=== Albums ===
Album title	Record label	Accreditation	Year of release
Poor Man's Blues	Wolf Records	John Primer	1991
Stuff You Got to Watch	Earwig	John Primer	1991
The Real Deal	Code Blue/Eastwest	John Primer	1995
Code Blue Sampler	Code Blue	Various Artists	1996
Cold Blooded Blues Man	Wolf Records	John Primer	1997
Keep on Lovin’ the Blues	Code Blue	John Primer	1997
Essential Chicago Blues	House of Blues	Various Artists	1997
Livin’ in the House of Blues: Roadhouse Blues	House of Blues	Various Artists	1997
Blues Behind Closed Doors	Wolf Records	John Primer	1998
It’s a Blues Life	Wolf Records	John Primer	1998
A Chicago Blues Tour	Big Chicago Records	Various Artists	1998
From West Helena to Chicago: Chicago Blues Session Vol. 8	Wolf Records	Various Artists	1998
Hound Dog Taylor: A Tribute	Alligator Records	Various Artists	1998
Teardrops Blues Jam: Chicago Blues Session Vol. 9	Wolf Records	Magic Slim & the Teardrops	1998
The Best of Slide Guitar	Wolf Records	Various Artists	1998
Easy Baby	Wolf Records	John Primer & the Teardrops	1999
Earwig 20th Anniversary Collection	Earwig	Various Artists	1999
Knockin’ at Your Door	Telarc	John Primer	2000
Blues for a Rotten Afternoon	Telarc	Various Artists	2000
Lucerne Blues Festival 2000	Lucerne Blues Festival	Various Artists	2000
Mile by Blues Mile	Lakeshore Records	Various Artists	2000
Telarc's Got More Blues	Telarc	Various Artists	2000
Blues Is a Feeling	Delmark Records	Jesse Thomas with John Primer & Jodie Christian	2001
Hooked on Blues: I Have to Stop	Wolf Records	Various Artists	2001
All Right	Blues Special Records	John Primer	2002
Blue Steel: A Tribute to Elmore James	Wolf Records	John Primer	2003
Wolf Records 20th Anniversary Collection	Wolf Records	Various Artists	2003
44 Blues Guitar Killers	Wolf Records	Various Artists	2006
All Original	Blues House Productions	John Primer	2008
Chicago Blues a Living History	Raisin' Music	Billy Boy Arnold, Billy Branch, Carlos Johnson, John Primer, Lurrie Bell	2011
Chicago Blues a Living History: The (R)evolution Continues	Raisin' Music	Billy Boy Arnold, Billy Branch, Carlos Johnson, John Primer, Lurrie Bell	2011
Blues on Solid Ground	Blues House Productions	John Primer	2012
Knockin’ Around These Blues	Delta Groove	John Primer and Bob Corritore	2013
You Can Make It If You Try	Wolf Records	John Primer & the Teardrops	2014
Muddy Waters 100	Raisin' Music	Multiple Artists	2015
Classic Chicago Blues: Live & Unreleased	Wolf Records	Bonnie Lee, Nick Holt, Earl Howell & John Primer	2015
That Will Never Do	Wolf Records	John Primer	2016
Chicago Blues a Living History: Live at Aulnay All Blues	Raisin' Music	Billy Boy Arnold, Billy Branch, Carlos Johnson, John Primer, Lurrie Bell	2017
Ain't Nothing You Can Do!	Delta Groove	John Primer and Bob Corritore	2017
The Soul of a Blues Man	Delta Groove	John Primer with The Real Deal Blues Band & special guest Billy Flynn	2019
The Gypsy Woman Told Me	SWMAF Records/VizzTone	John Primer and Bob Corritore	2020
Hard Times	Blues House Productions	John Primer	2022
Teardrops for Magic Slim: Live at Rosa's Lounge	Blues House Productions	John Primer	2023
Crawlin' Kingsnake	SWMAF Records/VizzTone	John Primer and Bob Corritore	2024
Slow Blues	Wolf Records	Magic Slim and John Primer	2024
Grown in Mississippi	Blue House Productions	John Primer	2025

=== Guest/sideman ===
Album title	Record label	Accreditation	Year of release
Blues Deluxe	XRT Records	Various Artists (Muddy Waters Band)	1980
Feel So Good	Isabel Records	Andrew “Big Voice” Odom	1982
The Blues Is Alright	Isabel Records	Little Milton	1982
Million Dollar Secret	Rooster Blues	Valerie Wellington	1984
Chicago Blues Session Vol. 3	Wolf Records	Magic Slim & the Teardrops	1986
Take Me Back	Blind Pig Records	James Cotton Band	1987
Chicago Blues Session Vol. 4	Wolf Records	Alabama Jr. Pettis & the Teardrops	1987
Chicago Blues Session Vol. 14	Wolf Records	A.C. Reed & Golden "Big" Wheeler	1987
Magic Slim Live	Plymouth House	Magic Slim & the Teardrops	1989
Gravel Road	Blind Pig Records	Magic Slim & the Teardrops	1989
John Littlejohn’s Blues Party: Chicago Blues Session Vol. 13	Wolf Records	John Littlejohn featuring Willie Kent & Tail Dragger	1980
Daddy, When Is Mama Comin’ Home	Earwig	Big Jack Johnson	1991
When the Blues Hit You	Earwig	Lester Davenport	1992
Tell My Story Movin’	Earwig	Louis Myers	1992
Big Boy	Wolf Records	Dana Gillespie & Joachim Palden with Magic Slim & the Teardrops	1992
Call Me	Wolf Records	Vance Kelly	1994
Living the Blues	Gitanes/Verve	James Cotton	1994
The Rising Sun Collection	Just a Memory	Big Mama Thornton	1994
The Trail of Tears	Wolf Records	Eddie Vaan Shaw	1994
A Tribute to Magic Sam	King Records (Japan)	Various Artists	1994
Blues Fest: Modern Blues of the ‘90s	Rhino Records	Various Artists	1995
Earwig 16th Anniversary Sampler	Earwig	Various Artists	1995
Joyriding in the Subway	Wolf Records	Vance Kelly	1995
My Little Girl	Wolf Records	Johnny Laws	1995
Big Sixteen	Ace	Big Joe Louis & His Blues Kings	1996
The Blues Is Nothing But Good News: Chicago Blues Sessions Vol. 20	Wolf Records	Eddie Shaw & the Wolf Gang	1996
Chicago Blues Harmonica	Wolf Records	Various Artists	1996
The King of Chicago’s West Side Blues: Chicago Blues Sessions Vol. 21	Wolf Records	Willie Kent & His Gents	1996
911 Blues	Wolf Records	Johnny B. Moore	1997
Spider in My Stew	Wolf Records	Magic Slim & the Teardrops	1998
Chicago Blues Session Vol. 1	Wolf Records	Boston Blackie & Otis "Big Smokey" Smothers	1998
Chicago Blues Session Vol. 4	Wolf Records	Alabama Jr. Pettis & the Teardrops	1998
I’m Good: Chicago Blues Session Vol. 7	Wolf Records	Bonnie Lee	1998
Chicago Blues Session Vol. 12	Wolf Records	John Brim & Pinetop Perkins	1998
Highway Is My Home	Wolf Records	Magic Slim & the Teardrops	1998
Come Back to Me Baby	Wolf Records	Little Mack Simmons	1998
Let Me Be Your Teddy Bear	Wolf Records	L.V. Banks	1998
Chicago Blues Session Vol. 22	Wolf Records	Hubert Sumlin & Billy Branch	1998
Teardrop	Wolf Records	Magic Slim & the Teardrops	1998
Chicago Bound	Wolf Records	Jimmy Rogers & Big Moose Walker	1998
Chicago’s Finest Blues Ladies	Wolf Records	Various Artists	1998
Chicago’s Hottest Guitars: Chicago Blues Session Vol. 25	Wolf Records	Phil Guy & Lurrie Bell	1998
Morning Rain: Chicago Blues Session Vol. 26	Wolf Records	Eddie Vaan Shaw	1998
You Better Watch Yourself	Wolf Records	Nick Holt	1998
Ramblin’ Man	House of Blues	Big Daddy Kinsey	1999
This Stuff Just Kills Me	Wolf Records	Jerry “Boogie” McCain	2000
Shoulder to the Wind	Tongue 'N Groove	The Matthew Skoller Band	2000
In the Pocket: A Taste of Blues Harmonica	Telarc	Various Artists	2001
Killer Diller	Delmark Records	Shirley Johnson	2002
Waiting for You	Gig Records	Nick Clemons Band	2003
Chicago’s Best West & South Side Blues Singers Vol. 2	Wolf Records	Various Artists	2004
They Were in This House	AV Records	Larry Taylor	2004
44 Blues	Wolf Records	Magic Slim & the Teardrops	2005
Sassy Mama	Just a Memory	Big Mama Thornton	2005
These Blue Nights	Wolf Records	Dana Gillespie	2006
The Essential Magic Slim	Blind Pig Records	Magic Slim & the Teardrops	2007
Rough Dried Woman	Wolf Records	Magic Slim & the Teardrops	2009
Let’s Live It Up	Delmark Records	Mississippi Heat	2010
Joined at the Hip	Telarc	Pinetop Perkins & Willie “Big Eyes” Smith	2010
Four Aces and a Harp	Swississippi Records	Swississippi Chris Harper	2010
Let’s Live It Up	Delmark Records	Mississippi Heat with special guests John Primer & Carl Weathersby	2010
The Blues Sessions	Earwig	Tim Woods	2010
The Life I Love	Delmark Records	Willie Buck	2010
Checkerboard Lounge: Live Chicago 1981	Eagle Vision	Muddy Waters & Rolling Stones	2012
Tin Pan Alley	Wolf Records	Magic Slim & the Teardrops	2012
Magic Blues: The Blues of the Magic Man	Wolf Records	Magic Slim & the Teardrops	2013
Daddy Told Me	Wolf Records	Shawn Holt & the Teardrops	2013
Gotta Keep Rollin’	Marquis/VizzTone	Rob Stone	2014
Pure Magic	Wolf Records	Magic Slim & the Teardrops	2014
Live on the Road	Wolf Records	Magic Slim & the Teardrops	2015
Do the Hip Shake Baby	VizzTone	Bob Corritore	2019
Porch Sessions	VizzTone	Tony Holiday	2019

== Awards and honors ==
John Primer has received numerous awards and honors throughout his career.

- 1987—W.C. Handy Award honoree for best traditional blues album of the year for Magic Slim & the Teardrops' Chicago Blues Sessions Vol. 3
- 1990—W.C. Handy Award winner for band of the year as a member of Magic Slim & the Teardrops
- 1991—W.C. Handy Award winner for band of the year as a member of Magic Slim & the Teardrops
- 1997—W.C. Handy Award nominee for traditional blues album of the year -- The Real Deal
- 1997—Awarded the Theresa Needham Blues Award by the Theresa Needham Blues Center for outstanding service to the blues community
- 2009—Grammy nominee for best traditional blues album -- Chicago Blues a Living History
- 2009—Blues Blast Music Awards honoree in best traditional blues album category -- Chicago Blues a Living History
- 2009—Blues Blast Music Awards nominee in best traditional blues album category -- All Original
- 2009—Blewzzy Award for best blues CD of the year -- All Original
- 2009—Blues Blast Music Awards nominee for male artist of the year
- 2010—Honored as male blues artist of the year by Living Blues magazine
- 2010—Blues Music Awards nominee for traditional male blues artist of the year
- 2010—Guitarist on Pinetop Perkins and Willie "Big Eyes" Smith's best traditional blues Grammy-winning Joined at the Hip album
- 2010—Blues Music Awards nominee for traditional blues album of the year -- All Original
- 2012—Blues Blast Music Awards nominee for traditional blues album of the year -- Chicago Blues a Living History: The (R)evolution Continues
- 2012—Blues Music Awards nominee for traditional male blues artist of the year
- 2012—Blues Music Awards honoree for traditional blues album of the year -- Chicago Blues a Living History: The (R)evolution Continues
- 2012—Blues Music Awards nominee for blues album of the year -- Chicago Blues a Living History: The (R)evolution Continues
- 2013—Blues Music Awards nominee for traditional male blues artist of the year
- 2013—Blues Music Awards nominee for acoustic blues album of the year -- Blues on Solid Ground
- 2013—Lifetime achievement award honoree from the Mississippi Valley Blues Society
- 2013—Lifetime achievement award honoree from the Pennsylvania Blues Society
- 2013—Blues Music Awards DVD of the year honoree, Live at the Checkerboard Lounge, included John in action with Muddy Waters and the Rolling Stones
- 2014—Blues Blast Music Awards nominee for traditional blues album of the year -- Knockin' Around These Blues with Bob Corritore
- 2014—Blues Music Awards nominee for traditional male blues artist of the year
- 2015—Blues Music Awards nominee for traditional male blues artist of the year
- 2015—Grammy nominee for best blues album -- Muddy Waters 100
- 2016—Blues Music Awards honoree as traditional male blues artist of the year
- 2017—Blues Blast Music Awards nominee for traditional blues album of the year -- Ain't Nothing You Can Do with Bob Corritore
- 2017—Blues Music Awards nominee for traditional male blues artist of the year
- 2017—Inducted as a legendary blues artist into the Chicago Blues Hall of Fame
- 2018—Blues Music Awards nominee for traditional male blues artist of the year
- 2019—Blues Blast Music Awards honoree as male blues artist of the year
- 2019—Blues Blast Music Awards honoree for soul blues album of the year -- The Soul of a Blues Man
- 2019—Living Blues Awards nominee for most outstanding musician (guitar)
- 2020—Blues Blast Music Awards nominee for traditional blues album of the year -- The Gypsy Woman Told Me with Bob Corritore
- 2020—Blues Music Awards nominee for traditional male blues artist of the year
- 2020—Living Blues Awards nominee for blues artist of the year
- 2021—Living Blues Awards honoree as traditional male blues artist of the year
- 2023—Inducted into the Blues Hall of Fame
- 2023—Blues Music Awards album of the year nominee for Hard Times
- 2023—Blues Music Awards traditional album of the year nominee for Hard Times
- 2023—Blues Music Awards honoree for traditional blues male artist of the year
- 2023—Living Blues Awards nominee for Hard Times for male artist of the year
- 2023—Living Blues Awards nominee for most outstanding musician (guitar)
- 2023—Living Blues Awards album of the year nominee for Hard Times
- 2024--Grammy traditional blues nominee for Teardrops for Magic Slim: Live at Rosa's Lounge

== Filmography ==
- 2005 – Live at B.L.U.E.S (Chicago)
- 2012 – Live at the Checkerboard Lounge: Live Chicago 1981 (with Muddy Waters & the Rolling Stones)
