= The Real Deal (John Primer album) =

Studio album by John Primer
- Released: 1995
- Genre: Chicago blues
- Label: Code Blue/East West
- Producer: Mike Vernon

John Primer chronology
| Stuff You Got to Watch (1991) | The Real Deal (1995) | Cold Blooded Blues Man (1997) |

The Real Deal is an album by the American musician John Primer, released in 1995. Primer supported the album with a North American tour. He subsequently named his backing band the Real Deal. The Real Deal was nominated for a W. C. Handy Award for best "Traditional Blues Album".

== Production ==
The album was produced by Mike Vernon, who had signed Primer to his label. Vernon thought that Primer came closest of the contemporary blues musicians to the sound of 1950s and 1960s Chicago blues. Billy Branch contributed on harmonica; David Maxwell played piano. "Good Understanding" is a cover of the Willie Dixon song. "Come Back Baby" is a cover of Ray Charles's version of the tune. Primer played slide guitar on "I Called My Baby".

== Critical reception ==
Professional ratings
Review scores
| Source | Rating |
|---|---|
| AllMusic | 4.5/5 stars |
| The Buffalo News | 3/5 stars |
| Chicago Tribune | 3.5/4 stars |
| The Indianapolis Star | 3.5/4 stars |
| MusicHound Blues: The Essential Album Guide | 2/5 stars |
| Pittsburgh Post-Gazette | 3.5/4 stars |
| Springfield News-Leader | 3/5 stars |

The Indianapolis Star praised the "simple four-piece band that shuffles, boogies, rocks and wails its way through a strong slate of songs." Stereo Review wrote that Primer's "assertive voice and buoyant guitar are propelled in just the right groove" by his backing band. The Chicago Tribune noted the "tough, no-nonsense swagger of his classic Chicago blues sound," writing that "Primer never wastes a note, never seems particularly eager to show off."

The Springfield News-Leader determined that the album "smoothly blends contemporary and traditional blues." The Richmond Times-Dispatch concluded that "the extensive guitar technique and emotive vocals are shadowed and embellished by Primer's band." The Pittsburgh Post-Gazette said that Primer's "gritty vocals and stinging guitar carry the genuine trademark of this swaggering Chicago music."

AllMusic called the album "long on intensity and devoid of pretension."

== Track listing ==
| No. | Title | Length |
|---|---|---|
| 1. | "Stop Draggin' That Chain Around" |
| 2. | "Tomorrow Might Not Be the Same" |
| 3. | "Still in Love with You" |
| 4. | "Blind Man Blues" |
| 5. | "How Long Will You Be Mine" |
| 6. | "Good Understanding" |
| 7. | "Come Back Baby" |
| 8. | "Cryin' for Your Love" |
| 9. | "Bad Blood" |
| 10. | "I Called My Baby" |
| 11. | "She Won't Gimme No Lovin'" |
| 12. | "Tired and Worried" |
