= Willie James Lyons =

American musician (1938–1980)

- Born: December 5, 1938; Alabama, United States
- Died: December 26, 1980 (aged 42) Chicago, Illinois, United States
- Genres: Chicago blues, electric blues
- Occupations: Guitarist, singer, songwriter
- Instruments: Guitar, vocals
- Years active: Late 1950s–1980

Willie James Lyons (December 5, 1938 – December 26, 1980) was an American Chicago blues guitarist, singer and songwriter. He worked primarily in the West Side of Chicago from the late 1950s up to his death. Lyons was an accompanist to many musicians who included Luther Allison, Jimmy Dawkins and Bobby Rush. A noted performer in his own right, Lyons work was influenced by B.B. King and Freddie King, T-Bone Walker and Lowell Fulson. His only solo album was Chicago Woman, recorded in France in 1979.

== Biography ==
Lyons was born in Alabama, United States. He was, according to the 1940 United States census, living in Aliceville, Alabama, with his parent, brother, and sister.

Details of his early life are sketchy, but he had relocated to Chicago, Illinois, by the mid-1950s. In 1971, Willie Kent took up residence at Ma Bea's Lounge in West Madison, Chicago. The house band became known as Sugar Bear and the Beehives, headed by Kent (the Sugar Bear) with guitarist Willie James Lyons and drummer Robert Plunkett. For the next six years, this troupe backed visiting musicians, such as Fenton Robinson, Hubert Sumlin, Eddy Clearwater, Jimmy Johnson, Carey Bell, Buster Benton, John Littlejohn, Casey Jones, and Mighty Joe Young. The house band's proficient playing led to their recording a live album in October 1975 at Ma Bea's, billed as Ghetto.

In the 1970s, Lacy Gibson also played alongside Lyons at the Poinciana on the West Side. In October 1977, Lyons played on Robert "Big Mojo" Elem's album, Mojo Boogie.

In December 1979, Lyons played guitar on Johnny "Big Moose" Walker's album, Going Home Tomorrow. He also appeared on Lefty Dizz's album, Somebody Stole My Christmas. The latter was recorded ten days after Walker's album, but not released until 1980. Lyons solo album, Chicago Woman, was recorded between December 1, and 22, 1979, at the Decca Studio, in Paris, France. The participants on the recording were Lyons on vocals and guitar, Johnny "Big Moose" Walker playing piano with Jimmy Johnson on second guitar, Robert "Big Mojo" Elem on bass guitar, and Odie Payne playing the drums. All three of these albums were released on the French record label, Isabel Records. Chicago Woman included Lyons re-working of Lowell Fulson's song "Reconsider Baby", in addition to covering other blues standards such as "Little Red Rooster" and "Hoochie Coochie Man" and "Rock Me Baby". However, Chicago Woman incorporated three of Lyons own compositions; "I've Got Trouble on My Mind", "Groovin' In Paris", plus the title track.

Lyons died on December 26, 1980, in Chicago at the age of 42. An obituary for him appeared in Living Blues magazine (issue No. 50) in early 1981. In 2018 the Killer Blues Headstone Project placed the headstone for Willie James Lyons at Restvale Cemetery in Alsip, Illinois.

== Discography ==
| Year | Title | Record label | Notes |
|---|---|---|---|
| 1975 | Ghetto | MCM Records | live album with one side by Willie Kent; reissued on CD in 1998 by Storyville Records |
| 1979 | Chicago Woman | Isabel Records | |

== See also ==
- List of Chicago blues musicians
