= Travelling Light =

Travelling Light or variations may refer to:

== Music ==
=== Albums ===
- Travelling Light (Lesley Garrett album), 2001
- Traveling Light (Courtney Jaye album), 2005
- Travelin' Light (Shirley Scott & Kenny Burrell album), 1964
- Travelin' Light (Shirley Horn album), 1965
- Travelin' Light (Zora Young album), 1992
- Trav'lin' Light (Jimmy Giuffre 3 album), 1958
- Trav'lin' Light (Anita O'Day album), 1961
- Trav'lin' Light (Queen Latifah album), 2007

=== Songs ===
- "Travelling Light", song by The Fireman from the 2008 album Electric Arguments
- "Travelling Light", song by Tindersticks from Tindersticks
- "Travellin' Light" (Cliff Richard song), 1959 song by Cliff Richard and the Shadows
- "Travelin' Light" (J. J. Cale song), 1976
- "Trav'lin' Light" (song), first recorded by Billie Holiday in 1942 with Paul Whiteman, later covered by several musicians
- "Travelin' Light", a song by Dierks Bentley featuring Brandi Carlile which was included on his 2018 album The Mountain

== Films ==
- Travelling Light (1959 film), a 1959 British naturist documentary
- Travelling Light (2003 film), Australian film directed by Kathryn Millard
- Traveling Light (1944 film), French title Le Voyageur sans bagage, a French film directed by Jean Anouilh
- Traveling Light (2022 film), an American film directed by Bernard Rose

== Other uses ==
- Travelling Light, 2012 play by Nicholas Wright
- Travelling Light (short story collection), 1987 book by Tove Jansson
