= Restless Feeling =

1998 blues album by Carl Weathersby

Studio album by Carl Weathersby
- Released: 1998
- Recorded: May 11–15, 1998
- Studio: Dockside Studios
- Genre: Jazz
- Label: Evidence Records
- Producer: John Snyder

Carl Weathersby chronology
Looking Out My Window (1997)	Restless Feeling (1998)	Come to Papa (2000)

Professional ratings
Review scores
Source	Rating
The Penguin Guide to Blues Recordings	3/4 stars

Restless Feeling is a blues album by Carl Weathersby. It was released in 1998 on the Evidence Records label. It was produced by John Snyder and recorded May 11–15, 1998 at Dockside Studios in Maurice, Louisiana.

== Track listing ==
1. "Matchbox Holds My Clothes" (Albert King) - 5:00
2. "A Real Mutha Fuh Ya" (Johnny "Guitar" Watson) - 6:23
3. "It's You That I Want" (Rico McFarland) - 4:44
4. "Restless Feeling" (Carl Weathersby) - 4:44
5. "Woman Song" (Carl Weathersby) - 4:02
6. "Wheel Of Fortune" (Steve Nails/Victor Palmer/Alan Wiley) - 4:00
7. "We All Wanna Boogie" (Allen Toussaint) - 4:07
8. "Meadville, Mississippi" (Carl Weathersby) - 3:47
9. "Everything I Do" (Carl Weathersby) - 3:50
10. "Rhymes" (Al Green/Mabon Hodges) - 3:22
11. "Tired Of Being Alone" (Rico McFarland/Mike Gray) - 4:32
12. "Glory Be" (Sam Hopkins/Clarence Lewis/Morgan Robinson) - 4:16
13. "She's Gone" (Rico McFarland) - 4:09

== Personnel ==
- Carl Weathersby - vocals, electric & acoustic guitar
- Rico McFarland - electric & acoustic guitar, lead vocal on "Tired Of Being Alone", background vocals
- David Torkanowsky - Hammond B-3 organ, piano, keyboards
- Dave Smith - bass
- Steve Potts - drums
- Juanita Brooks - background vocals
