= Bonnie Lee =

American singer

- Also known as: Bonnie Lee Murray; Bonnie "Bombshell" Lane "Sweetheart of the Blues"
- Born: Jessie Lee Frealls; June 11, 1931; Bunkie, Louisiana, U.S.
- Died: September 7, 2006 (aged 75) Chicago, Illinois, U.S.
- Genres: Chicago blues, soul-blues
- Occupation: Singer
- Instrument: Vocals
- Years active: Late 1950s–2006
- Label: Various

Bonnie Lee (June 11, 1931 – September 7, 2006) was an American Chicago blues singer known as "The Sweetheart of the Blues". She is best remembered for her lengthy working relationships with Sunnyland Slim and Willie Kent. David Whiteis, who interviewed Lee in researching his book Chicago Blues: Portraits and Stories, stated, "she was one of the last of her genre, the big-voiced woman blues singer fronting a Chicago band."

== Biography ==
She was born Jessie Lee Frealls in Bunkie, Louisiana, and raised in Beaumont, Texas.

She learned to play the piano as a child. Her mother refused to let her join the gospel singer Lillian Glinn on tour. She later toured with the Famous Georgia Minstrels, meeting Clarence "Gatemouth" Brown and Big Mama Thornton.

In 1958 she moved to Chicago and chose the stage name Bonnie Lee, working as both a dancer and singer. Two years later she signed a recording contract with J. Mayo Williams's Ebony Records. Williams insisted on billing her as Bonnie "Bombshell" Lane on her first single, "Sad and Evil Woman". She disliked the name. After the single failed to sell, she returned to Chicago jazz and blues nightclubs. She was later billed as Bonnie Lee Murray, using the surname of her husband at the time.

In 1967 Lee first appeared on a bill with the pianist Sunnyland Slim, and their working arrangement included residencies at several Chicago clubs. At the end of the 1970s, she recorded further singles, released by AIrway Records (owned by Slim Records). She suffered from poor health at that time but then enjoyed a long professional partnership with Willie Kent. Backed by Willie Kent and the Gents, she became a regular performer at B.L.U.E.S., a noted Chicago blues club, for many years. There she sang her most famous numbers, "I’m Good" and "Need Your Love So Bad."

In 1982, performing with Zora Young and Big Time Sarah as Blues with the Girls, she toured Europe, and they recorded an album in Paris. In 1992 Lee performed on Magic Slim's album 44 Blues, with John Primer. Her album Sweetheart of the Blues was released under her own name by Delmark Records in 1995, and three years later another collection, I'm Good, was issued.

Lee died on September 7, 2006, at the age of 75, after years of poor health. In 2013 the Killer Blues Project placed a headstone for Bonnie Lee Murry at Restvale Cemetery in Alsip, Illinois.

== Partial discography ==
Year	Title	Label
1995	Sweetheart of the Blues	Delmark
1998	I'm Good: Chicago Blues Session, Volume 7	Wolf Records

== See also ==
- List of Chicago blues musicians
