= Checkerboard Lounge =

South side Chicago blues club

Coordinates: 41.816435°N 87.615211°W

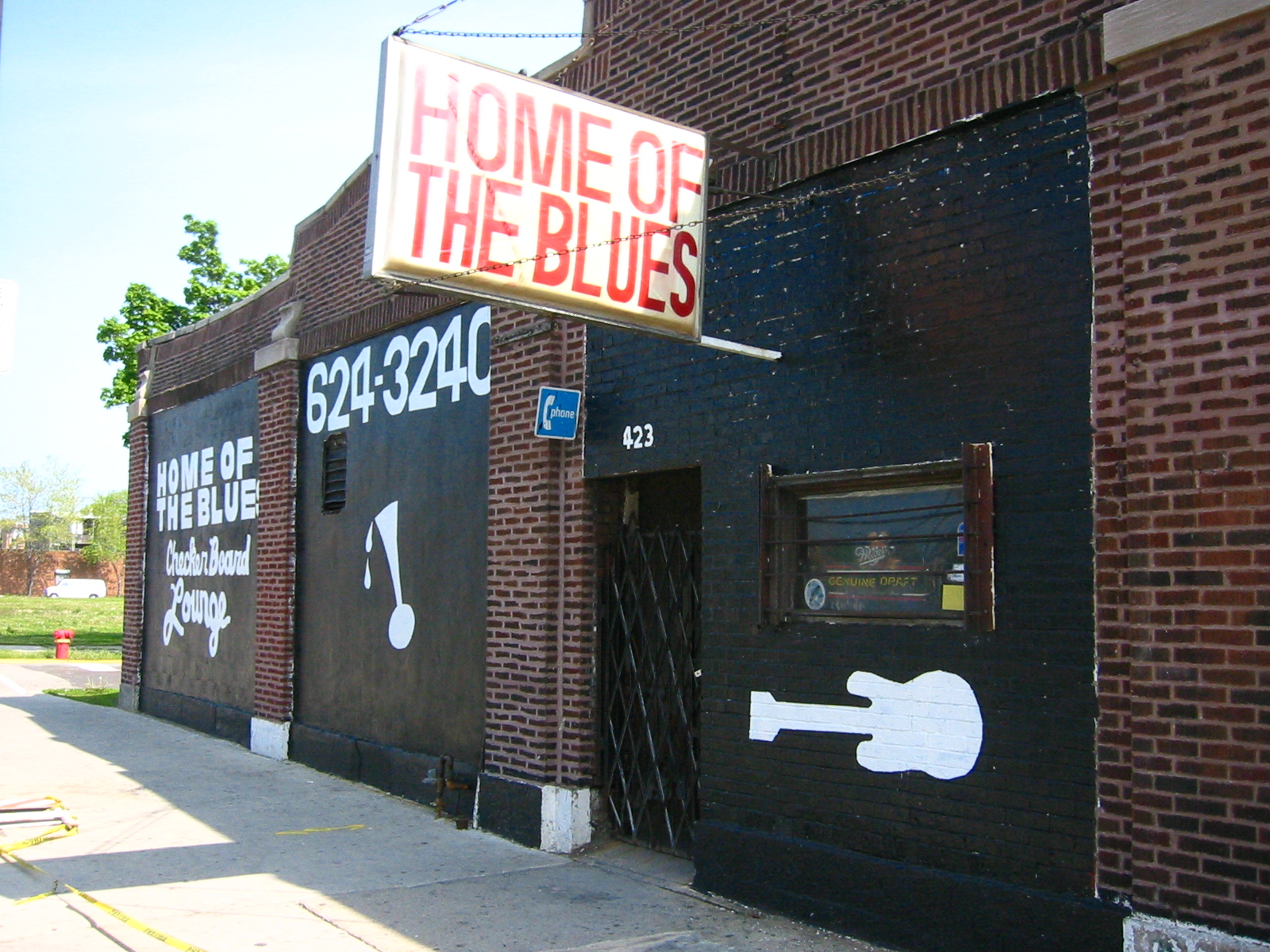
Exterior of the club in 2003

The Checkerboard Lounge was a blues club on the South Side of Chicago, Illinois, established in 1972 at 423 E. 43rd St. by L.C. Thurman and Buddy Guy. In 1985, Guy left the partnership and later established Buddy Guy's Legends in Chicago's South Loop neighborhood.

The club hosted musical acts including Lefty Dizz, Stevie Ray Vaughan, Eric Clapton, Magic Slim, Vance Kelly, Muddy Waters, the Rolling Stones, James Cotton, Little Johnny Christian and the Chicago Playboys, Scotty and the Rib Tips, Jerry Lucky Lee and the Groove Machine, Willie Buck, Joe Carter, Dave Myers, James Cotton, John Primer, and Chuck Berry. The Rolling Stones video and album Live at the Checkerboard Lounge, Chicago 1981 included the Stones performing with Muddy Waters, Buddy Guy, Junior Wells, and members of Muddy Waters' band.

In 2003, the Checkerboard Lounge, in danger of closing due to structural issues with the building, moved to a newly renovated building at 5201 S. Harper Court in Hyde Park. The club experienced declining attendance and it closed its doors in 2015, after the death of L.C. Thurman.
