= Carl Weathersby =

American musician (1953–2024)

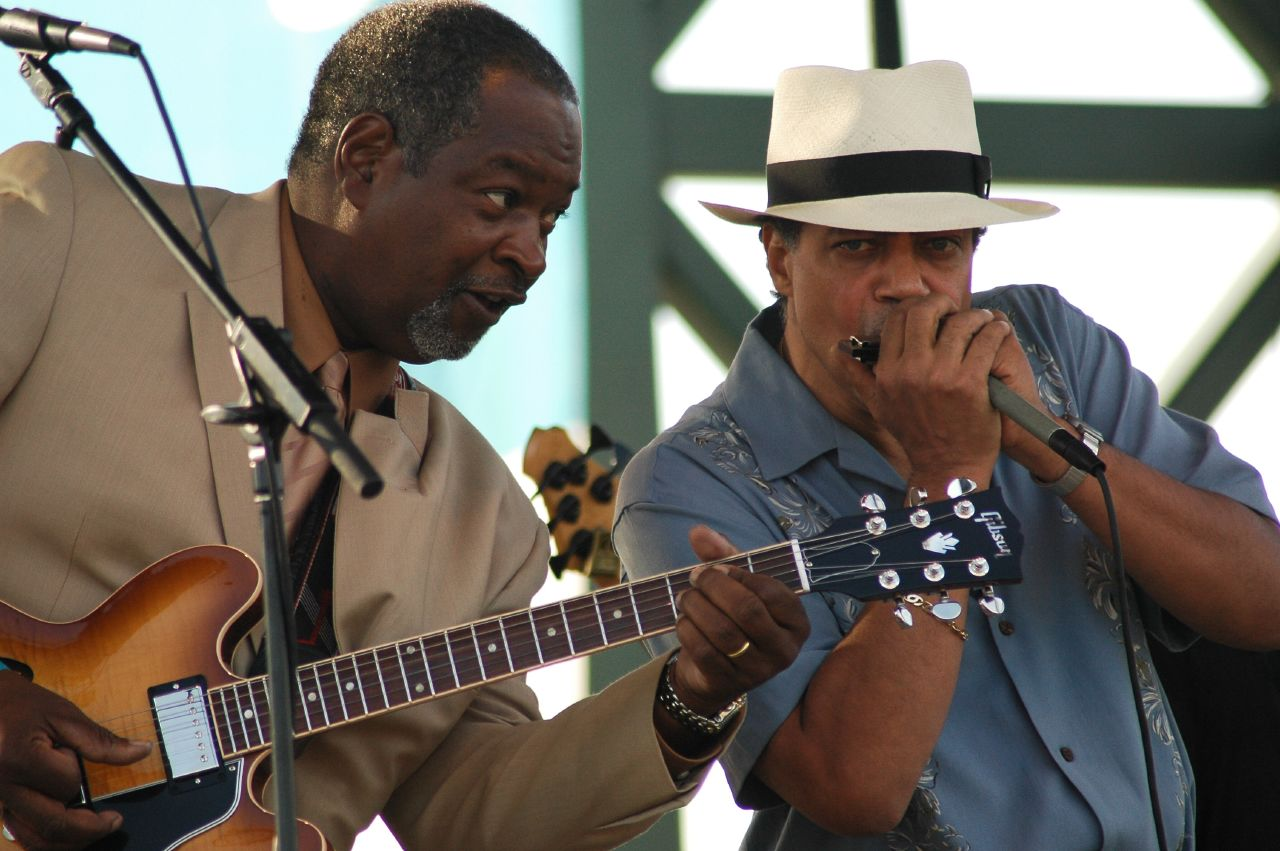
- Weathersby and Billy Branch at the Arkansas Blues and Heritage Festival, 2005

Background information
- Born: Carlton Weathersby; February 24, 1953; Jackson, Mississippi, U.S.
- Died: August 9, 2024 (aged 71)
- Genres: Electric blues
- Occupation(s): Singer, guitarist, songwriter
- Instrument: Guitar
- Years active: 1970s–2024
- Website: www.carlweathersby.org

Carlton Weathersby (February 24, 1953 – August 9, 2024) was an American electric blues vocalist, guitarist, and songwriter. He worked with Albert King and Billy Branch, among others, and had a career as a solo artist. He was nominated for the W. C. Handy Award for Best New Blues Artist in 1997.

== Biography ==
Weathersby was born in Jackson, Mississippi on February 24, 1953. He spent his early years in Meadville, Mississippi, a place he still considered home, although when he was aged eight, his family moved to East Chicago, Indiana.

=== Pre-musician years (1953–1979) ===
As a teenager, Weathersby began to learn to play the guitar. One day, after practicing "Cross Cut Saw" many times through, he decided to show his father. After he finished playing it, his father's friend, a man Weathersby knew as Albert, the diesel mechanic, said, "Man, that ain't the way that song goes, that ain't the way I played it." The mechanic turned out to be Albert King, who then showed Weathersby how to play it. Despite Weathersby's mistake, King was impressed and eventually hired Weathersby to play rhythm guitar with him on tour.

However, his career as musician started many years later. Before then, Weathersby worked many jobs, ranging from steel mill worker to prison guard to police officer. He also served in the U.S. Army from 1971 to 1977, during the Vietnam War.

=== Collaborative years (1979–1995) ===
After the Vietnam War, Weathersby began playing rhythm guitar with Albert King on short road trips from 1979 to 1981, but the experience solidified Weathersby's identity as a blues musician.

He then started filling in for the guitarist Carlos Johnson, of the Sons of Blues, who Weathersby described as "a pretty shaky guy, you know. He could show up just as easy as he couldn't show up..." Eventually the band hired Weathersby as their full-time guitarist, a position he held for the next fifteen years.

=== Solo years (1995–2024) ===
His position as guitarist for the Sons of Blues earned him a name among the blues fans of Chicago, it also left him feeling discontented.

Because of his growing popularity, Evidence Records released Weathersby's first album, Don't Lay Your Blues on Me, in 1996, and his subsequent albums, up to Best of Carl Weathersby. His only live album, In the House, was recorded at the Lucerne Blues Festival in Switzerland, when he was joined by the harmonica player and past bandmate Billy Branch. In The House was released under the CrossCut record label. Weathersby has since self produced the album, Hold On.

He performed as the headline artist twice a week at the Kingston Mines in Chicago, Illinois.

Weathersby died on August 9, 2024, at the age of 71.

== Discography ==
=== Solo albums ===
- 1996: Don't Lay Your Blues on Me (Evidence)
- 1997: Looking Out My Window (Evidence)
- 1998: Restless Feeling (Evidence)
- 2000: Come to Papa (Evidence)
- 2003: Best of Carl Weathersby (Evidence)
- 2004: In the House: Live at Lucerne Vol. 5 (CrossCut)
- 2005: Hold On, Louisiana (Red Hot)
- 2009: I'm Still Standing Here (Magnolia)
- 2019: ‘'Live at Rosa’s Lounge'’ (Bearpath Records)

=== As sideman/guest ===
- 1985: Billy Branch & the Sons of Blues, Romancing the Blue Stone (Black & Blue)
- 1985: Buster Benton, Blues at the Top (Evidence)
- 1989: Robert Covington, Blues in the Night (Evidence)
- 1992: Billy Branch & the Sons of Blues, Mississippi Flashback (GBW)
- 1994: Hubert Sumlin & Billy Branch, Chicago Blues Session, Vol. 22 (Wolf)
- 1994: Carey Bell, Deep Down (Alligator)
- 1994: George Gruntz, Beyond Another Wall: Live in China (TCB)
- 1995: Billy Branch, The Blues Keep Following Me Around (Verve)
- 1996: Jayne Cortez & the Firespitters, Taking the Blues Back Home (Verve)
- 1996: Billy Branch, Satisfy Me (Verve)
- 1999: Mississippi Heat, Handyman (Van Der Linden)
- 2001: Rico McFarland, Tired of Being Alone (Evidence)
- 2002: Buster Benton, Blues Reference: Blues and Trouble (Black & Blue)
- 2002: Mississippi Heat, Footprints on the Ceiling (CrossCut)
- 2003: The Sons of Blues, Blues Reference: As the Years Go Passing By (Black & Blue)
- 2004: Trudy Lynn, Blues Power: Trudy's Blues (Isabel)
- 2004: Charles Wilson, If Heartaches Were Nickels (Delmark)
- 2004: Nora Jean Bruso, Going Back to Mississippi (Severn)
- 2004: Sam Cockrell & the Groove, I'm in the Business (Boom Boom)
- 2005: Mississippi Heat, Glad You're Mine (CrossCut)
- 2005: Biscuit Miller, Come Together
- 2005: Little Milton, Think of Me (Telarc)
- 2008: Mississippi Heat, "Hattiesburg Blues" (Delmark)
- 2005: Bernard Allison, Larry McCray, Carl Weathersby, Lucky Peterson, Triple Fret JSP
- 2010: Mississippi Heat, John Primer, Carl Weathersby, Let's Live It Up! (Delmark)

== See also ==
- List of blues musicians
