= School District 126 =

School District 126 may refer to:

- Alsip, Hazelgreen, Oak Lawn School District 126
- Zion-Benton Township High School District 126
