= Ain't It Nice =

Studio album by Willie Kent
- Released: 1991
- Genre: Blues, Chicago blues
- Label: Delmark
- Producer: Bob Koester, Steve Wagner

Willie Kent chronology
I'm What You Need (1989)	Ain't It Nice (1991)	King of Chicago's West Side Blues (1991)

Ain't It Nice is an album by the American musician Willie Kent, released in 1991. He supported it with a North American tour. The writer Jeffery Renard Allen used "Feel So Good" as the first track on the CD that was included with his book of poetry Harbors and Spirits.

== Production ==
The album was produced by Bob Koester and Steve Wagner. Kent was backed by his band, the Gents, which included Lester Davenport on harmonica. Bonnie Lee sang on "I'm Good". "Worry Worry" is a version of the song made famous by B. B. King.

== Critical reception ==
Professional ratings
Review scores
Source	Rating
All Music Guide to the Blues	4/5 stars
The Buffalo News	3/5 stars
Chicago Tribune	3.5/4 stars
The Grove Press Guide to the Blues on CD	3/5 stars
MusicHound Blues: The Essential Album Guide	3/5 stars
The North County Blade-Citizen	3/4 stars
The Penguin Guide to Blues Recordings	3.5/4 stars
The Rolling Stone Jazz and Blues Album Guide	3.5/5 stars

The Chicago Tribune said, "Kent and his Gents are a classic-period electric Chicago blues band, with the occasional more modern touch-here an electric organ, there high-life rhythms, a couple of two-chord settings-and, most important, with a wonderfully infectious swing." The Washington Post noted that Kent "has a ... rough hewn voice and bellowing delivery that makes nearly everything he sings sound convincing." The North County Blade-Citizen stated that "Kent's vocals, the real driving force here, are powerful and emotive." The Buffalo News called Kent "a journeyman in the best sense, a strong songwriter and emotive vocalist, whose craftsmanship has been honed by three decades of experience." The Ann Arbor News listed Ain't It Nice among the five best blues albums of 1991.

== Track listing ==
No.	Title	Length
1.	"Memory of You"
2.	"Check It Out"
3.	"Worry Worry"
4.	"One More Mile"
5.	"Ain't It Nice"
6.	"What You Doin' to Me"
7.	"I'm Good"
8.	"Ma Bea's"
9.	"Coming Home"
10.	"Feel So Good"
11.	"Stranded"
