= Valerie Wellington =

American singer

- Born: Valerie Eileen Hall; November 14, 1959; Chicago, Illinois, United States
- Died: January 2, 1993 (aged 33) Maywood, Illinois
- Genres: Chicago blues, electric blues
- Occupations: Singer, actress
- Instrument: Vocals
- Years active: Late 1970s–1992
- Label: Flying Fish

Valerie Wellington (November 14, 1959 – January 2, 1993) was an American singer who, in her short career, switched from singing opera to singing Chicago blues and electric blues. On her 1984 album, Million Dollar Secret, she worked with Sunnyland Slim, Billy Branch, and Magic Slim. She also worked with Lee "Shot" Williams.

== Biography ==
She was born Valerie Eileen Hall in Chicago, Illinois. She was trained as an opera singer and graduated from the American Conservatory of Music, but in 1982 she took up singing the blues in Chicago clubs. She also worked in theater, playing roles portraying earlier blues singers, such as Ma Rainey and Bessie Smith. Her opera training enabled her to project her voice to theater audiences. She appeared at the 1984 San Francisco Blues Festival, on a bill with Marcia Ball and Katie Webster.

Her recorded work blended a traditional vaudeville approach with a contemporary Chicago blues format. Wellington made few recordings, but her voice was used in advertisements on television and radio. Her recording of "Whole Lotta Shakin' Goin' On" was used on the soundtrack of the 1989 film Great Balls of Fire!, in which she briefly appeared, depicting Big Maybelle. In the same year, she toured Japan with Carlos Johnson.

Wellington died of a cerebral aneurysm in Maywood, Illinois, in January 1993, at the age of 33. She was interred at the Restvale Cemetery, in Alsip, Illinois.

Million Dollar Secret was reissued by Rooster Blues in 1995.

== Discography ==
Year	Title	Record label
1984	Million Dollar Secret	Flying Fish
1991	Life in the Big City	GBW (Japan)

== See also ==
- List of Chicago blues musicians
- List of electric blues musicians
