= Buddy Scott =

Blues guitarist

Buddy Scott, 1993

Kenneth "Buddy" Scott (January 9, 1935 – February 5, 1994) was an American blues guitarist.

Scott was born in Goodman, Mississippi, United States and came from a family of Chicago blues musicians. Both of his brothers, vocalist Howard and guitarist Walter, played locally, and his son is Kenneth "Hollywood" Scott. He learned to play guitar from his mother and from Reggie Boyd. He was born in Mississippi but moved to Chicago when he was seven, and joined the doo-wop group the Masqueraders. His brothers formed a group, the Scott Brothers, Buddy formed a group called Scotty and the Rib Tips and recorded several singles late in the 1960s. They played locally in Chicago blues establishments for over a generation.

Scott signed a recording contract with Verve in 1993, and released his debut major-label release, Bad Avenue, that year, but died of stomach cancer in Chicago, Illinois, not long after the album's release. In 2017 the Killer Blues Headstone Project placed the headstone for Kenneth Scott at Restvale Cemetery in Alsip, Illinois.
