= Walked All Night Long =

Studio album by Louisiana Red and Lefty Dizz
- Length: 15:58
- Language: English
- Label: Fat Possum Records
- Producer: Kent Cooper; Heiner Stadler

Walked All Night Long is an album recorded by blues artists Louisiana Red and Lefty Dizz in 1976, and released on CD in 1997. The CD contains 15 tracks, 10 of which are original tracks written or co-written by Louisiana Red. Red handles all the lead vocals, as well as guitar and harmonica. Dizz plays lead guitar. Kyril Bromley plays piano on tracks 7, 13 & 15.

Professional ratings
Review scores
Source	Rating
The Penguin Guide to Blues Recordings	3/4 stars
AllMusic	4/5 stars

== Track listing ==
1. "First Degree" – 3:20 - Louisiana Red & Kent Cooper
2. "Bring My Machine Gun" – 4:40 - Louisiana Red
3. "King Bee" – 2:33 - James Moore (Slim Harpo)
4. "Stole From Me" – 2:53 – Kent Cooper
5. "Too Poor To Die" – 2:54 – Louisiana Red
6. "Walked All Night Long" – 2:35 – Louisiana Red
7. "Cold White Sheet" – 6:08 – Louisiana Red & Kent Cooper
8. "Pinetop" – 4:43 – Louisiana Red
9. "Going Train Blues" – 4:50 – Kent Cooper & Don Johnson
10. "I'll Pay The Price" – 3:11 – Kent Cooper
11. "Going Down Georgia" – 3:16 – Louisiana Red
12. "Ever Heard A Churchbell Sound" – 3:39 – Traditional
13. "Mary" – 4:57 – Louisiana Red
14. "Got A Gal With A Dog Won't Bark" – 3:18 – Louisiana Red
15. "The Whole World" – 4:41 – Louisiana Red & Kent Cooper
