= Restvale Cemetery =

Cemetery in Alsip, Cook County, Illinois, US

Coordinates: 41°40′47″N 87°45′02″W

- Interactive map of Restvale Cemetery

Details
- Established: 1927
- Location: 11700 S. Laramie Ave, Alsip, Illinois
- Country: United States
- Type: Historically Black

Restvale Cemetery is in Alsip, Illinois, United States, a suburb southwest of the city of Chicago. A number of Chicago blues musicians, educators, and notable people are buried there.

Restvale and Burr Oak were the last two historically black cemeteries to open in the area; both had their first burials in 1927.

The cemetery is owned by Willie Carter, who through the company Cemecare also co-owns the Burr Oak and the Cedar Park cemeteries.

== Notable interments ==
- John Henry Barbee (1905–1964), blues singer, guitarist
- David Barksdale (1947–1974), leader of the Black Disciples street gang
- Doctor Clayton (1898–1947), blues songwriter and singer
- Nathaniel "Sweetwater" Clifton (1926–1990), professional basketball player
- Lee Cooper (1924–1964), blues guitarist
- Kermit Dial (1908–1982), professional Negro League baseball player
- William Ezell (1892–1963), blues, jazz, ragtime and boogie-woogie pianist and occasional singer
- Jazz Gillum (1904–1966), blues harmonica player
- Arvella Gray (1906–1980), blues, folk and gospel singer and guitarist
- Hip Linkchain (1936–1989), Chicago blues guitarist, singer and songwriter
- Earl Hooker (1929–1970), blues guitarist
- Big Walter "Shakey" Horton (1918–1981), blues harmonica player
- J. B. Hutto (1926–1983), blues guitarist
- Little Johnny Jones (1924–1964), blues pianist and singer
- Moody Jones (1908–1988), Chicago blues musician
- Sammy Lawhorn (1935–1990), Chicago blues guitarist
- Bonnie Lee (1931–2006), Chicago blues singer
- Cripple Clarence Lofton (died 1957), boogie-woogie pianist and singer
- Willie James Lyons (1938–1980), blues guitarist, singer and songwriter
- Samuel "Magic Sam" Maghett (1936–1969), blues musician
- Charles "Papa Charlie" McCoy (1909–1950), blues musician
- Kansas Joe McCoy (1905–1950), blues musician
- Romeo Nelson (1902–1974), boogie-woogie pianist
- James Burke "St. Louis Jimmy" Oden (1903–1977), blues musician, composer
- Archie Pate (1886–1936), professional Negro League baseball player
- Gary Primich (1958–2007), blues musician
- Bobby Robinson (1903–2002), professional Negro League baseball player
- Buddy Scott (1935–1994), blues guitarist
- Charlie Segar (dates unknown), blues pianist and singer, the first to record the blues standard, "Key to the Highway" (1940)
- Pinetop Smith (1904–1929), boogie-woogie pianist
- Willie "Big Eyes" Smith (1936–2011), Grammy Award-winning musician and vocalist
- Freddie Spruell (1893–1956), Delta blues guitarist and singer
- Eddie Taylor (1923–1985), blues guitarist, songwriter
- Theodore Roosevelt "Hound Dog" Taylor (1915–1975), blues musician
- George Washington Thomas (1883–1937), songwriter
- Luther Tucker (1936–1993), blues guitarist
- Washboard Doc 1911–1988), blues musician
- Muddy Waters (1913–1983), blues musician
- Johnny "Daddy Stove Pipe" Watson (1867–1963), blues musician
- Valerie Wellington (1959–1993), actress, opera singer, blues singer
- Tom Williams (1894–1937) Negro leagues pitcher, Chicago American Giants

== See also ==
- List of United States cemeteries
