= Big Time Sarah =

American singer (1953 - 2015)

- Born: Sarah Streeter; January 31, 1953; Coldwater, Mississippi, United States
- Died: June 13, 2015 (aged 62) near Chicago, Illinois, United States
- Genres: Blues
- Occupation: Vocalist
- Years active: 1970s–2015
- Labels: Delmark
- Formerly of: Sunnyland Slim

Sarah Streeter (January 31, 1953 – June 13, 2015), better known by her stage name Big Time Sarah, was an American blues singer.

== Biography ==
She was born in Coldwater, Mississippi, and raised in Chicago, where she sang in gospel choirs in South Chicago churches. At age 14, she began singing blues at the Morgan's Lounge Club, and in the 1970s she played with musicians such as Magic Slim, Buddy Guy, The Aces, Junior Wells, Johnny Bernard, and Erwin Helfer.

Her experience playing with Sunnyland Slim led to her first solo release, a single released on his label, Airway Records. Teamed with Zora Young and Bonnie Lee in 'Blues with the Girls', Sarah toured Europe in 1982 and recorded an album in Paris, France. From 1989, she performed with a group called The BTS Express. From 1993 to 2015, she recorded for Delmark Records.

== Death ==
Big Time Sarah died on June 13, 2015, aged 62, from heart complications in a Chicago-area nursing home.

== Discography ==
Studio albums

Year	Title	Label
1985	Undecided	Blues R&B Recording
1993	Lay It on 'em Girls	Delmark (Big Time Sarah & the BTS Express)
1996	Blues in the Year One-D-One	Delmark (Big Time Sarah & the BTS Express)
2001	A Million of You	Delmark

Compilation albums

Year	Title	Label
1982	Blues with the Girls	Epm Musique
2001	Long Tall Daddy with Sunnyland Slim	Arcola Records
