= Little Victor =

American singer

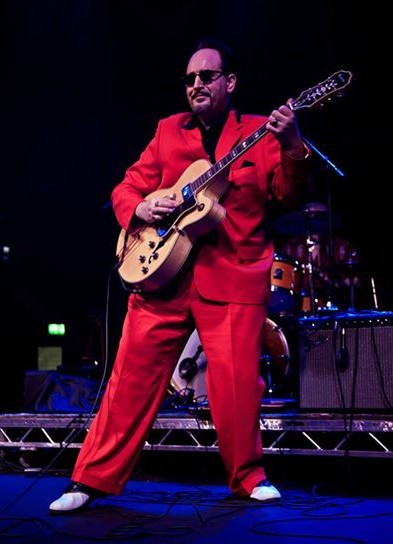
- Little Victor in 2015 at Sun Records 63rd Birthday Bash at The O2 Arena in London, England

Background information
- Also known as: Victor Mac, The Beale Street Blues Bopper, DJ Mojo Man
- Born: Victor F. Macoggi; January 31, 1967 (age 59); Rome, Italy
- Origin: West Memphis, Arkansas
- Genres: Blues, roots, rock and roll, americana, rhythm and blues, alternative
- Occupations: Guitarist, harmonicist, singer, record producer, performer, disc jockey, entertainer
- Instruments: Guitar, harmonica, drums, human voice
- Years active: 1981–present
- Labels: Ruf Records (former) Witchcraft Records (former) Wild Records USA (former) El Toro Records ( former) Bluestown Records (former) Rhythm Bomb Records and Rockstar Records UK Music Group (current)
- Website: littlevictormusic.com

Victor Mac (born Victor Macoggi on January 31, 1967) who is better known as Little Victor, The Beale Street Blues Bopper, and also DJ Mojo Man, is an Italian-American blues and roots singer, guitarist and harmonica player, as well as a record collector, musicologist, entertainer, disc jockey and record producer. He is best known for his association with Louisiana Red, on the albums Back To The Black Bayou and Memphis Mojo.

== Biography ==
Son of an Italian mother and an American serviceman who was constantly on the move, Victor also leads a wanderer's life on both sides of the Atlantic. He was born in Rome, Italy. and he grew up in many different places. He lived in West Memphis, Arkansas, Austin, Texas, Memphis, Tennessee, and Louisiana. He also spent several years in Italy, France, Germany, and Spain, before moving to the UK in 2014. He speaks fluent English, French, Italian and Spanish, He started to sing at the age of 14 - in 1981 - hence the nickname of "Little" Victor. His first band mostly featured songs from the Sun Records vaults. At 16 he started to play harmonica inspired by Jimmy Reed and the following year first picked up the guitar. He played for tips on Beale Street in Memphis six days a week with Uncle Ben Perry, the "King of Handy Park." This association is why Little Victor is also known as The Beale Street Blues Bopper. He sang, played and recorded with many different roots, rock and blues bands in the 1980s and early 1990s. He also did some recordings with Alex Chilton and Hubert Sumlin, before releasing Cuttin' Out (1994). In 1999, Little Victor was involved in the production of a film documentary on R.L. Burnside entitled, A Day with...R.L. Burnside, a collaboration with Sophie Kay which also spawned two albums together.

His association with his blues hero Louisiana Red, produced the albums Back To The Black Bayou (2009) and Memphis Mojo (2011). Victor's own effort, Boogie All Night, was issued by El Toro Records, in between those collaborations, whilst in 2013 he produced and played on Pig Fat's Shadow of the Night. In 2015, Little Victor toured Canada with the harmonica player Harpdog Brown and, in 2016, he produced and played on Brown's Travelin' with the Blues recorded in California with Charlie Musselwhite, Big Jon Atkinson, Rusty Zinn, Carl Sonny Leyland and Jimmy Morello.

The music journalist Johnny Whiteside, writing in the Los Angeles Times, described Little Victor's style of music:

'Little Victor (is) an untamed maverick whose raw, primitive sounds are the utter antithesis of the contemporary blues model. The offbeat singer-guitarist... eschews the genre’s prevalent trend for streamlined six-string virtuosity in favor of wild shouting, stabbing guitar and heavy, almost hypnotic, rhythmic repetition... He can effortlessly switch from shadowy, primitive low blues to the polished, uptown Beale Street-style R&B... to wild, wicked boogies, and all of it is put across with expressive, soul-deep conviction.'

In 2017, he started to work as a freelance consultant and producer for the Rockstar Records UK Group. He produced various albums that were released by Rhythm Bomb Records such as The Blues of Little Walter by Mo Al Jaz & Friends and Jelly Roll Shuffle by the Jelly Roll Men. He also worked on a series of anthologies of obscure 1950s blues and rhythm and blues, for the Koko-Mojo label.

In 2018, Victor released Deluxe Lo-Fi, recorded over an eight-year period with various musicians, including the Downhome Kings, Kim Wilson, Big Jon Atkinson, Rusty Zinn, Carl Sonny Leyland, Steve Lucky and Harpdog Brown. The songs, mostly Little Victor's original compositions, display a wide range of styles. In an interview with the Good New Music blog, Victor said, 'The whole point here and the ‘concept’ of this album is about songs captured on old magnetic tape with vintage tube equipment at great vintage studios... the last two songs were recorded at a ‘modern’ state-of-the-art studio in Hollywood by the great Jeff ‘Mox’ Moxley but both songs were bounced through a vintage tube desk on magnetic tape, so the outcome sounds just like the other songs and has the same ‘vibe’ and feel.'

Deluxe Lo-Fi was voted 2018 "Album Of The Year" in the UK by The Blues Lounge and in Scandinavia by BluesNews magazine.

In January 2020, Little Victor formed the Mighty Lo-Fi Kings, a new band with Rob Glazebrook, in which both play guitar and share vocals. Orlando Shearer pays bass and Nick Simonon the drums. The band regularly performed at Peggy Sue's Music Bar in Leigh-on-Sea and the Black Lion in Brighton, until the COVID lockdown, in March 2020, ended live music.

In 2023, Little Victor, with fellow American blues singer and guitarist Son Jack Jnr, formed The Two Bad Jims, a band playing the North Mississippi Hill country blues and boogie of R. L. Burnside. The band, which also features Nick Simonon on drums, took their name from Burnside's 1994 album, Two Bad Jim. In 2024, the band released Over The Hill - A Tribute To RL Burnside, an album of Burnside covers, on Thunder Town Music.

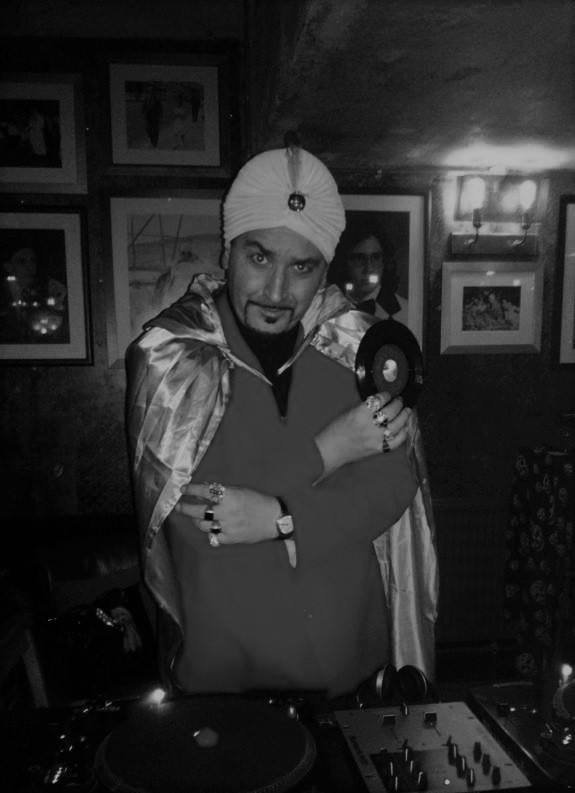
The Mojo Man

== Selected discography ==
=== As artist ===
Year	Title	Credit(s)	Record label
1994	Cuttin' Out	Little Victor	Blue Jay Records
1996	Space Shuffle	Little Victor	Blue Jay Records
2000	Cookin' with Gas	Little Victor & Sophie Kay	Blue Rabbit Records
2001	Just Rockin' The Blues	Little Victor & Sophie Kay	Blue Rabbit Records
2007	Blues Shakedown (EP)	Little Victor	Witchcraft Records
2008	Back to the Black Bayou	Louisiana Red & Little Victor's Juke Joint	Bluestown Records
2009	Let's Get High	Little Victor	Wild Records
2009	Back to the Black Bayou	Louisiana Red & Little Victor's Juke Joint	Ruf Records
2011	Boogie All Night	Little Victor	El Toro Records
2011	Memphis Mojo	Louisiana Red & Little Victor's Juke Joint	Ruf Records
2018	Deluxe Lo-Fi	Little Victor	Rhythm Bomb Records

=== As band member/producer ===
- Ras Smaila - Black Man's Blues (2000) (Dixiefrog)
- Sophie Kay - Rengaines (2003) (Jano Records)
- Simon Boyer - Let There Be Blues (2006) (Shuffle Records)
- David Evans - Needy Times (2007) (Inside Memphis)
- Tav Falco's Panther Burns - Conjurations: Seance for Deranged Lovers (2011) (Stag-O-Lee)
- Louisiana Red & Little Victor's Juke Joint - Back to the Black Bayou (2008 Bluestown / 2009 Ruf)
- Jo' Buddy & Downhome King III - Everything's Gonna Be Alright (2010) (Ram Bam Records)
- Little Victor - Boogie All Night (2011) (El Toro Records)
- Louisiana Red & Little Victor's Juke Joint - Memphis Mojo (2011) (Ruf Records)
- Pig Fat - Shadow of the Night (2013) (Pig Fat Records)
- Harpdog Brown - Travelin' With The Blues (2016) (Doghouse Records)
- Mo Al Jaz & Friends - The Blues of Little Walter (2017) (Chest/Rhythm Bomb Records)
- Dexter Shaw & The Wolftones - Dexin' (2017) (Rhythm Bomb Records)
- Egidio "Juke" Ingala & The Jacknives - Switcharoo (2017) (Rhythm Bomb Records)
- The Jelly Roll Men - Jelly Roll Shuffle (2017) (Rhythm Bomb Records)
- The Two Bad Jims - Over the Hill (2017) (Thunder Town Music)

=== The Mojo Man presents (CDs) ===
- Various - Cheap Old Wine & Wiskey (2017) (Koko-Mojo Records)
- Various - Bad Hangover (2017) (Koko-Mojo Records)
- Various - You're Too Bad (2018) (Koko-Mojo Records)
- Various - Burning Frets (2018) (Koko-Mojo Records)
- Various - Love Shock (2018) (Koko-Mojo Records)
- Various - Fool Mule (2018) (Koko-Mojo Records)
- Various - Burning Frets (2018) (Koko-Mojo Records)
- Various - Don't Mess With Me Baby (2018) (Koko-Mojo Records)
- Various - Cat Scratchin' (2018) (Koko-Mojo Records)
- Various - Do You Mean It? (2019) (Koko-Mojo Records)
- Various - I Ain't Gonna Hush (2019) (Koko-Mojo Records)
- Various - Take A Trip (2019) (Koko-Mojo Records)
- Various - Sputnik Dance (2019) (Koko-Mojo Records)
- Various - Motorvatin' Vol.1 (2019) (Koko-Mojo Records)
- Various - Motorvatin' Vol.2 (2019) (Koko-Mojo Records)
- Various - Sugar Jump (2019) (Koko-Mojo Records)
- Various - Dapper Dan (2019) (Koko-Mojo Records)
- Various - Wild Life (2019) (Koko-Mojo Records)
- Various - Voodoo Lou (2019) (Koko-Mojo Records)
- Various - Holy Smoke (2019) (Koko-Mojo Records)
- Various - It's A Man Down There (2019) (Koko-Mojo Records)
- Various - Crockroach Run (2019) (Koko-Mojo Records)
- Various - Work With It (2019) (Koko-Mojo Records)
- Various - Black Halloween (2019) (Koko-Mojo Records)
- Various - Blink Before Christmas (2019) (Koko-Mojo Records)
- Various - Popcorn Blues Party Vol.1 (2019) (Koko-Mojo Records)
- Various - Popcorn Blues Party Vol.2 (2019) (Koko-Mojo Records)
- Various - Popcorn Blues Party Vol.3 (2019) (Koko-Mojo Records)

=== The Mojo Man presents (Vinyl EPs) ===
- Andre Williams - Don't Touch (2018) (Koko-Mojo Records)
- Johnny "Guitar" Watson - Gangsters & Lovers (2018) (Koko-Mojo Records)
- Joe Tex - Cuttin' (2018) (Koko-Mojo Records)
- Gene & Eunice (2018) (Koko-Mojo Records)
- Larry Williams (2018) (Koko-Mojo Records)

=== The Mojo Man presents (Vinyl LPs) ===
- Various - Too Much Booze (2018) (Koko-Mojo Records)
- Various - Bad Hangover (2018) (Koko-Mojo Records)
- Various - Walking Girl (2019) (Koko-Mojo Records)
- Various - Back Fire (2019) (Koko-Mojo Records)

== Awards ==
- 2009: Grand Prix du Disque (France) Louisiana Red & Little Victor's Juke Joint - Back to the Black Bayou
- 2009: German Record Critics' Award (Germany) Louisiana Red & Little Victor's Juke Joint - Back to the Black Bayou
- 2010: Blues Music Awards (USA) : Nominations for "Blues Album of the Year" and "Traditional Blues Album of the Year"
- 2011: Jimi Awards (USA) Louisiana Red & Little Victor's Juke Joint - Memphis Mojo for Best Live Album of the Year
- 2016: Maple Blues Awards (Canada) : Nomination for "Recording/Producer of the Year"
- 2018: Blues Lounge Radio Show Awards: Best Album award for Deluxe Lo-Fi
- 2019: Blues Lounge Radio Show Awards: Hall of Fame Inductee
