= Louisiana Red =

American blues singer-songwriter and musician (1932–2012)

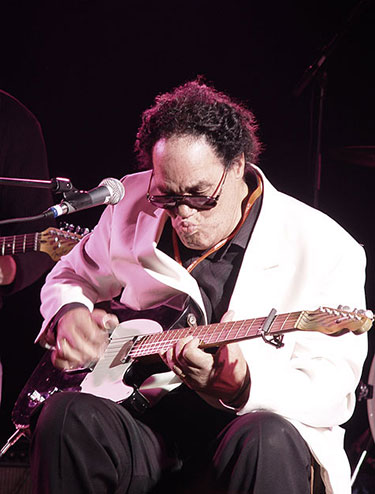
- Louisiana Red performing in Denmark

Background information
- Born: Iverson Minter; March 23, 1932; Bessemer, Alabama, U.S.
- Died: February 25, 2012 (aged 79) Hanover, Germany
- Genres: Blues
- Occupations: Singer; songwriter; musician
- Instruments: Vocals; guitar; harmonica
- Years active: 1949–2012
- Labels: Chess; Atlantic; Earwig Music; Roulette; Ruf; JSP
- Spouse: Ealase Minter (m. 1963; died 1973) Odetta Holmes (m. 1977 div. 1983) Dora Minter (m. 1984)
- Website: Official website

Iverson Minter (March 23, 1932 – February 25, 2012), known professionally as Louisiana Red, was an American blues guitarist, harmonica player, and singer, who recorded more than 50 albums. A master of slide guitar, he played both traditional acoustic and urban electric styles, with lyrics both honest and often remarkably personal. His career includes collaborations with artists as Muddy Waters, John Lee Hooker, Eric Burdon, and others.

== Early life ==
Born March 23, 1932, in Bessemer, Alabama, Minter lost his parents early in life; his mother died of pneumonia shortly after his birth, and his father was lynched by the Ku Klux Klan in 1937, prompting an aunt to place him in an orphanage. He later lived with his grandmother and an uncle in Pittsburgh.

At sixteen, Minter lied about his age and joined the U.S. Army, serving in Korea during the Korean War. Minter was assigned to a labor battalion and spent his evenings belting out the blues at the service club.

== Career ==
=== Early career ===
His first album, Lowdown Back Porch Blues, was recorded in New York City with Tommy Tucker and released in 1963. His second album, Seventh Son, was released later the same year. Louisiana Red released the single "I'm Too Poor to Die" for the Glover label in 1964. It peaked at number 117 on the Billboard Hot 100 and number 30 on the Cashbox chart. (Billboard did not publish an R&B chart in 1964.)

He maintained a busy recording and performing schedule through the 1960s and 1970s, working in sessions for Chess, Checker, Atlas, Glover, Roulette, L&R and Tomato, amongst others.

=== Later career ===
Like many other blues musicians, Minter long struggled to make a living in his native country, so in the early 1980s he moved to Germany where, to his delight, he found audiences far more receptive to his elemental sound. He lived in Hanover, Germany, from 1983.

In 1994, Louisiana Red fused the blues with the urban Greek music of the bouzouki player Stelios Vamvakaris, on the album Blues Meets Rembetika. He continued to tour, including regular returns to the United States, until his death. In 2011, Louisiana Red released the album Memphis Mojo, to broad public acclaim.

== Personal life ==
Minter married a woman named Ealase in 1963. Together they raised three children. Ealase died of cancer in 1973.

His second marriage was to folk singer and civil rights activist Odetta in 1977. Minter separated from her in 1983 to pursue his career in Germany.

In 1984 he married Dora, a German-Ghanaian woman who acted as his manager later in life. Minter adopted Dora’s two sons and together they resided in Hanover, Germany.

== Death ==
English slide guitarist Michael Messer noted on February 25, 2012, "I am very sorry to be bringer of such sad news that my dear friend, Louisiana Red, died this morning. He had a stroke on Monday and had been in a coma." He died in Hanover, aged 79.

== Filmography ==
He appeared in the films Rockpalast (1976), Comeback (1982), Ballhaus Barmbek (1988), Red and Blues (2005) and Family Meeting (2008).

In 2005, Louisiana Red, became the central figure in the documentary film 'Red and Blues' directed by the German-Finnish filmmaker Susanna Salonen. The documentary chronicles Louisiana Red's life touring across Germany, providing an intimate look into his experiences as an elderly African-American blues artist residing in Europe.

== Discography ==
=== Albums ===
- Lowdown Back Porch Blues (1963, Roulette)
- Seventh Son (1963, Carnival) [this is a 1972 reissue of Lowdown Back Porch Blues with Glover single 3002 added]
- Shouts the Blues (1970, Forum Circle) [this is a 1970 reissue of Lowdown Back Porch Blues with the last two tracks deleted]
- Louisiana Red Sings the Blues (1972, Atlantic)
- Sweet Blood Call (1975, Blue Labor)
- Dead Stray Dog (1976, Blue Labor)
- New York Blues (1979, L+R)
- Reality Blues (1980, L+R)
- High Voltage Blues, with Sugar Blue (1980, Black Panther)
- Midnight Rambler (1982, Tomato/Rhino)
- Blues for Ida B (1982, JSP)
- Boy from Black Bayou (1983, L+R)
- Blues from the Heart (1983, JSP)
- Anti Nuclear Blues (1983, L+R)
- Bluesman (1984, JSP)
- Back to the Road Again (1984, MMG)
- My Life, with Carey Bell (1984, L+R)
- World on Fire (1985, MMG)
- Brothers in Blues (1985, CMA)
- Back to the Roots (1987, CMA)
- Last Mohican of the Blues (1992, Polton)
- Ashland Avenue Blues (1992, Schubert)
- Always Played the Blues (1994, JSP)
- Louisiana Red (1994, Forum)
- Blues Meets Rembetika (1994, Distazi)
- Sittin' Here Wonderin' (1995, Earwig Music)
- Sugar Hips (1995, CMA)
- Rising Sun Collection (1996, JAMR)
- I Hear the Train Coming (1997, Chrisly)
- Over My Head (1997, Chrisly)
- Walked All Night Long with Lefty Dizz, originally recorded in 1976 (1997, Blues Alliance)
- Rip Off Blues (1998, Chrisly)
- Winter & Summer Sessions (1998, Blues Factory)
- Driftin' (1999, Earwig Music)
- Millennium Blues (1999, Earwig Music)
- Sings Deep Blues (2001, P-Vine)
- A Different Shade of Red (2002, Severn)
- No Turn on Red (2005, Hightone)
- Hot Sauce (2005, Red Lightnin')
- Back to the Black Bayou, with Kim Wilson and Little Victor (2008, Bluestown)
- You Got to Move, with David Maxwell (2009, Blu Max/Vizztone)
- Memphis Mojo, with Little Victor (2011, Ruf)
- When My Mama Was Living (2012, Labor Records; recorded 1975)

=== Live albums ===
- Live & Well (1976, Ornament)
- King Bee, with Sugar Blue (1978, Orchid)
- Red, Funk and Blue, with Sugar Blue (1978, Black Panther)
- Live in Montreux (2000, Labor)
- Live at 55, with Carey Bell (1994, Enja)
- Bad Case of the Blues, with Carey Bell (2004, Mojo Tone)
- Live at Painted Sky (2008, Paul Productions)
- Red Funk 'n Blue: The Complete 1978 Recordings [with Sugar Blue] (2021, JSP Records)

=== Compilation albums ===
- Anthologie du Blues, vol. 11 (Roulette)
- Blues Classics (1983, L+R)
- Pretty Woman (1991, Blues Beacon)
- The Best of Louisiana Red (1995, Evidence)
- The Blues Spectrum of Louisiana Red, with Sugar Blue (1998, JSP)
- The Sky Is Crying (2014, Wolf Records)

=== Guest appearances (selected) ===
- Carey Bell, Brought Up the Hard Way
- Eric Burdon, Comeback
- Kent Cooper, The Blues and Other Songs
- Bob Corritore, Harmonica Blues
- Champion Jack Dupree, After All
- John Lee Hooker, Down Child
- Albert King, Blues Guitar Killers, with Johnny Winter and Rory Gallagher
- Albert King, Live
- Brownie McGhee, Rainy Day
- Roswell Rudd, Blown Bone
- Johnny Shines, Too Wet to Plow
- Sunnyland Slim, Decoration Day
- Roosevelt Sykes, Boogie & Blues
- Roosevelt Sykes, Music Is My Business
- Wentus Blues Band, Family Album

=== Various artists (selected) ===
- The Paul Jones Rhythm & Blues Show – The American Guests (JSP CD210)
- The Paul Jones Rhythm & Blues Show – The American Guests, vol. 3 (JSP CD235)
- Chicago Blues, vol. 2
- Earwig 16. Ann. Sampler (1995, Earwig Music)
- Earwig 20. Ann. Sampler (2000, Earwig Music)
- American Folk Blues Festival (1980, 1983, L+R)
- The 1. Blues Sampler (1980, L+R)
- Blues Legends – Blues Giants (1993, Castle Communications)
- Live at Boston Blues Festival, vol. 2 (2007, Blues Trust)
- Family Meeting, Wentus Blues Band with Mick Taylor and Lazy Lester (2008, Ruf)
- Blues Wire Birthday Tour (Greece, 2007)
- Houserockin' and Blues Shoutin – Rhythm Room 15 Year Anniversary Album (2006, Blue Witch Records)

== Awards ==
- W. C. Handy Award for Best Traditional Blues Male Artist, 1983
- Lifetime Achievement Award, Blues Trust Productions, 2006
- Grand Prix du Disque (Blues) for Back to the Black Bayou, 2009
- German Record Critics Award (2nd quarter) for Best New Release (Blues), 2009
- Bluesnews Poll for Back to the Black Bayou, 2009
- Blues Music Award for Acoustic Album of the Year (You Got to Move), 2010
