= Vance Kelly =

American musician (born 1954)

Vance Kelly (born January 24, 1954) is an American soul blues singer and guitarist who has performed regularly at various music venues in the Chicago area, chief among them being the 1815, Checkerboard Lounge, Rosa's Lounge, Kingston Mines, Buddy Guy's Legends, and B.L.U.E.S.

A music journalist noted of Kelly, "Like Primer, he combines an enquiring eye for a song with a moderately conservative taste in sound, producing music that lives by the principles of classic Chicago bar blues yet is not enslaved by the past".

== Early life ==
Kelly was born in the Near West Side community area of Chicago. His father was a gospel musician, and his uncle, LeRoy McCauley, was a part-time blues musician.

Kelly's own interest in and talent for performing music were on display at an early age; he was playing guitar by the age of seven, despite never having had a formal lesson. Then, at the age of 10, Kelly performed blues for the first time at a Chicago school. As a teenager, he sat in at various clubs on Chicago's South Side and later appeared both as a solo artist and as a sideman in those clubs, backing such artists as the West-Side singer Mary Lane when he was 15. It was during this time that Kelly developed his unique "ringing" guitar sound, which raised his profile among members of Chicago's blues community.

== Early career ==
Kelly experimented with disco music during the late 1970s, but he had rekindled his interest in blues music by the end of the decade. Major influences on Kelly's playing style during this stage of his musical development included B.B. King, Muddy Waters, and Johnny Christian.

In 1987, Kelly was invited to become a member of saxophonist A.C. Reed's Sparkplugs. Kelly's tenure with this group influenced his vocal style, while allowing him to refine his guitar skills, and provided him with road experience.

After playing with Reed's band for three years, however, Kelly decided to strike out on his own. One reason for this decision was his eagerness to cultivate his own style, which has come to be characterized as a mixture of electric blues, R&B, funk, and disco. Kelly's urge to leave Reed's band also stemmed from his desire to adapt his blues playing to the perceived tastes of a particular audience. With regard to the latter point, Kelly has said, "If the older folks come in, I want to take them back to the Delta blues. When the middle-aged folks come in, they just want to hear regular-type blues. If a younger crowd comes in, they want to hear up-to-date type blues."

== Rise to prominence ==
Kelly formed the Backstreet Blues Band soon after he ended his tenure with Reed, and signed a recording contract with the Vienna, Austria-based Wolf Records International in 1992. Members of Kelly's band included John Primer on guitar; David Honeyboy on harmonica; Eddie Shaw on the saxophone; Erskine Johnson on the keyboard; and Johnny Reed playing bass.

In 1994, Kelly and his band had a breakthrough when his debut album, Call Me, earned critical acclaim and introduced Kelly to audiences beyond the Chicago area. The album went on to win the Best Album of 1994 (New Recording) as well as the Living Blues Award for Best Contemporary Blues Album in 1995.

The following year, Kelly released Joyriding in the Subway, which featured assistance on lyrics and vocals by Vivian Kelly, Vance Kelly's daughter. As with Kelly's debut outing, Joyriding in the Subway also included the guitarwork of John Primer, bass playing of Johnny Reed, and keyboard music of Erskine Johnson. Critics largely praised the album and noted its "stylistic breadth," citing influences on the songs such as A.C. Reed, Tyrone Davis, and Little Milton.

== Recent activities ==
Kelly has worked steadily since these two hit releases of the 1990s, producing a string of well-received albums that showcased his signature mix of blues, soul, and funk styles. He continues to record with the Backstreet Blues Band, most recently releasing the album Bluebird in October 2008. He has also played at a number of blues gatherings, including the annual Chicago Blues Festival. Between 1999 and 2002, Kelly took part in three separate European concert tours.

While Kelly remains relatively unknown outside of the Chicago blues community, his fanbase is loyal and has expanded considerably over the years. His daughter, Vivian Kelly, is a blues musician in her own right who released her debut album, Hit Me Up, on October 10, 2006.

A musical documentary, Someplace Else, made by film makers Kai-Duc Luong and Avisheh Mohsenin, portraying Kelly and featuring a number of his trademark songs, was released in 2008 and played at international film festivals such as the Hawaii International Film Festival, Los Angeles Asian Pacific Film Festival and Rhode Island International Film Festival.

== Discography ==
- Call Me – 1994
- Joyriding in the Subway – 1995
- Hands Off! – 1998
- What Three Old Ladies Can Do – 2000
- Live at Lee's Unleaded Blues – 2003
- Nobody Has the Power – 2005
- Bluebird – 2008
- How Can I Miss You, When You Won't Leave – 2018
