= Zora Young =

American blues singer (born 1948)

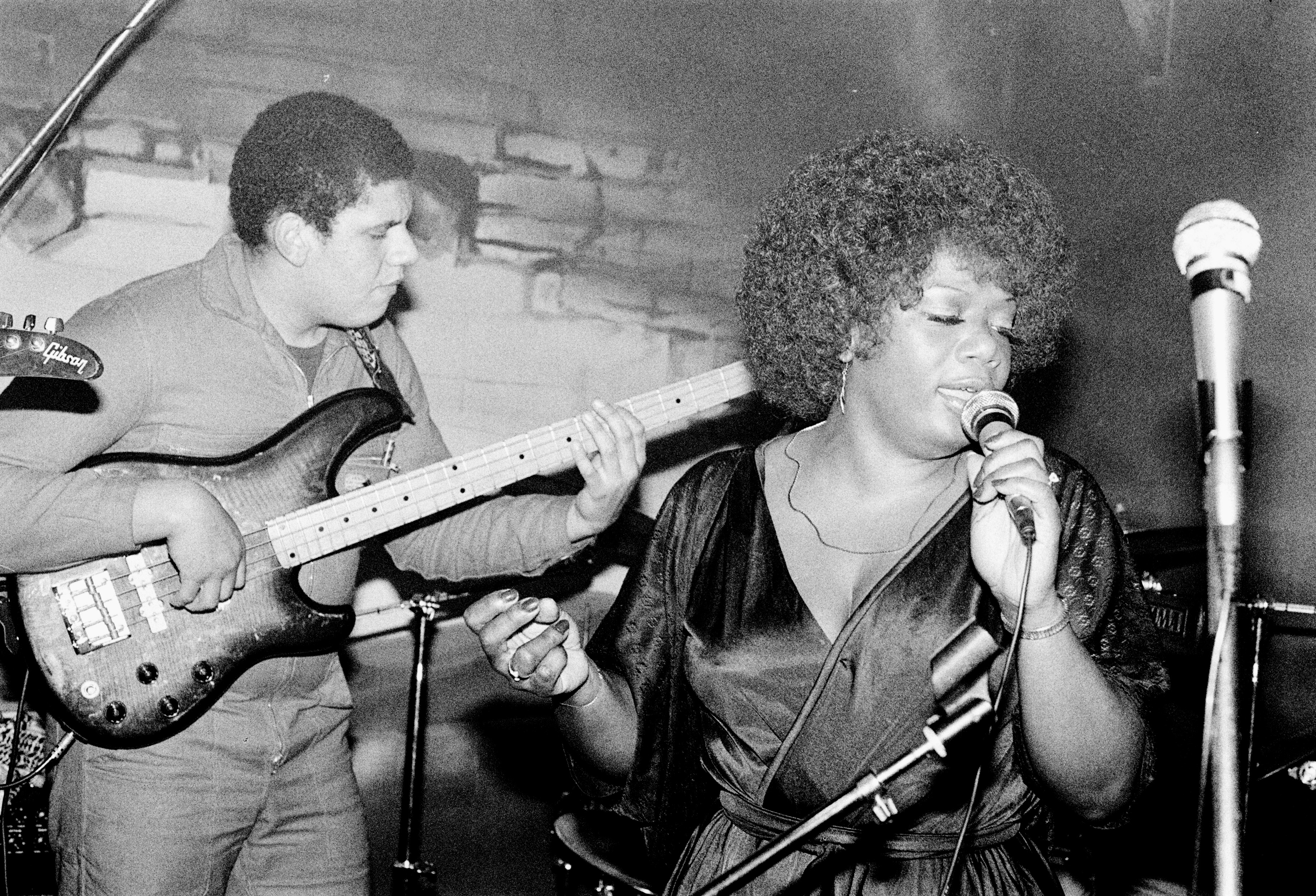
- Young in 1982

Background information
- Born: Zora Young; January 21, 1948 (age 77); West Point, Mississippi, United States
- Genres: Blues
- Occupation(s): Musician, singer
- Instrument: Vocals
- Years active: Late 1960s–present
- Labels: Delmark; Deluge; Airway
- Website: ZoraYoungMusic.com

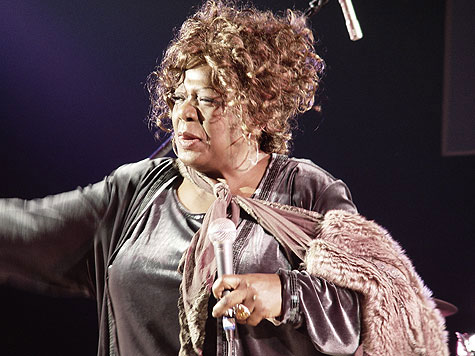
Young in 2007

Zora Young (born January 21, 1948, West Point, Mississippi, United States) is an American blues singer. She is distantly related to Howlin' Wolf.

Young's family moved to Chicago when she was seven. She began singing gospel music at the Greater Harvest Baptist Church. As an adult she began singing blues and R&B. Over the course of her career, she has performed with Junior Wells, Jimmy Dawkins, Bobby Rush, Buddy Guy, Albert King, Professor Eddie Lusk, and B. B. King. Among those she has collaborated with on record are Willie Dixon, Sunnyland Slim, Mississippi Heat, Paul deLay, and Maurice John Vaughn.

In 1982, she toured Europe with Bonnie Lee and Big Time Sarah, billed as "Blues with the Girls", and recorded an album in Paris. She was later cast in the role of Bessie Smith in the stage show The Heart of the Blues. By 1991 she had recorded the album Travelin' Light, with the Canadian guitarist Colin Linden.

Young has toured Europe more than thirty times and has made appearances in Turkey and Taiwan. She was the featured performer at the Chicago Blues Festival six times.

In 2014, she was nominated for a Blues Music Award in the category 'Traditional Blues Female' (known as the Koko Taylor Award). Her latest album, Friday Night (2016), featured Little Mike and the Tornadoes.

== Discography ==
- Travelin' Light (Deluge Records, 1992)
- Learned My Lesson (Delmark Records, 2000)
- Tore Up from the Floor Up (Delmark, 2005)
- Sunnyland (Airway, 2009)
- The French Connection (Delmark, 2009)
- Friday Night (Elrob Records, 2016)
