= Live at the Checkerboard Lounge, Chicago 1981 =

Video by the Rolling Stones and Muddy Waters
- Released: 10 July 2012
- Recorded: 22 November 1981
- Venue: Checkerboard Lounge, Chicago, United States
- Genre: Rock, blues
- Length: 90:00 (DVD)
- Label: Eagle Vision

The Rolling Stones chronology
L.A. Friday (Live 1975) (2012)	Live at the Checkerboard Lounge, Chicago 1981 (2012)	Live at the Tokyo Dome (2012)

Professional ratings
Review scores
Source	Rating
AllMusic	4/5 stars
Jam!	3.5/5 stars
PopMatters	9/10
Uncut	7/10

Live at the Checkerboard Lounge, Chicago 1981 is a concert video and live album by American blues musician Muddy Waters and members of the English rock band the Rolling Stones. It was recorded on 22 November 1981 by David Hewitt on the Record Plant Black Truck, mixed by Bob Clearmountain, and released on 10 July 2012.

The Checkerboard Lounge was a blues club in Bronzeville, on the South Side of Chicago, which was established in 1972 by Buddy Guy and L.C. Thurman.

== Track listing ==
=== CD ===
1. Introductions – 1:44
2. "You Don't Have to Go" – 5:43
3. "Baby Please Don't Go" – 11:00
4. "Hoochie Coochie Man" – 4:18
5. "Long Distance Call" – 4:49
6. "Mannish Boy" – 10:25
7. "Got My Mojo Workin'" – 3:18
8. "Next Time You See Me" – 11:00
9. "One Eyed Woman" – 9:44
10. "Clouds in My Heart" – 6:22
11. "Champagne and Reefer" – 6:58

=== DVD ===
1. "Sweet Little Angel"
2. "Flip Flop And Fly"
3. Muddy Waters Introduction
4. "You Don’t Have To Go"
5. "Country Boy"
6. "Baby Please Don’t Go"
7. "Hoochie Coochie Man"
8. "Long Distance Call"
9. "Mannish Boy"
10. "Got My Mojo Working"
11. "Next Time You See Me"
12. "One Eyed Woman"
13. "Baby Please Don’t Go (Instrumental)"
14. "Clouds in My Heart"
15. "Champagne and Reefer"

== Personnel ==
Muddy Waters and His Band

- Muddy Waters – vocals, guitar
- Rick Kreher – guitar
- John Primer – guitar
- Lovie Lee – piano
- Earnest Johnson – bass
- Ray Allison – drums
- George "Mojo" Buford – harmonica

Guests

- Mick Jagger – lead vocals
- Keith Richards – guitar
- Ronnie Wood – guitar
- Ian Stewart – piano
- Buddy Guy – vocals, guitar
- Lefty Dizz – vocals, guitar
- Junior Wells – vocals, harmonica
- Nick Charles – bass

== Charts ==
=== DVD charts ===
Chart (2012)	Peak position
Australian Music DVDs Chart	5
Austrian Music DVDs Chart	1
Belgian (Flanders) Music DVDs Chart	6
Belgian (Wallonia) Music DVDs Chart	5
Dutch Music DVDs Chart	2
Swedish DVDs Chart	2
Swiss Music DVDs Chart	3
UK Music Video Chart	6

=== Album charts ===
Chart (2012)	Peak position
Dutch Albums Chart	34
French Albums Chart	189
German Albums Chart	36
US Blues Albums Chart	15

2017 chart performance for Live at the Checkerboard Lounge, Chicago 1981
Chart (2017)	Peak position
Belgian Albums (Ultratop Flanders)	191

2022 chart performance for Live at the Checkerboard Lounge, Chicago 1981
Chart (2022)	Peak position
Belgian Albums (Ultratop Wallonia)	199
German Albums (Offizielle Top 100)	21
