= Lefty Dizz =

American blues guitarist and singer (1937–1993)

- Born: Walter Williams; April 29, 1937; Osceola, Arkansas, United States
- Died: September 7, 1993 (aged 56) Chicago, Illinois, United States
- Genres: Chicago blues, electric blues
- Occupations: Guitarist, singer
- Instrument: Guitar
- Years active: Late 1950s–1993
- Labels: Isabel, JSP, Black & Blue, Wolf

Lefty Dizz (April 29, 1937 – September 7, 1993) was an American Chicago blues guitarist and singer whose recorded work was released on eight albums.

As well as fronting his own band, he worked with Junior Wells, J. B. Lenoir and Hound Dog Taylor. One commentator noted that "for wild-ass showmen in blues history ... one would certainly have to go a far piece to beat Lefty Dizz". He favoured a right-handed Fender Stratocaster, which he played left-handed, hence the first part of his stage name. The derivation of the second part of his stage name is uncertain. According to one source, the name came from his playing the trumpet in the style of Dizzy Gillespie; another source says that Ted Harvey, the drummer for Hound Dog Taylor & the HouseRockers, gave him the nickname in reference to his "playing jazz in the alley".

He was reputedly the brother of blues musician Johnny Dollar.

== Biography ==
He was born Walter Williams in Osceola, Arkansas. He learned the rudiments of guitar playing while serving for four years in the United States Air Force. Unlike other left-handed players who restrung their instruments to mirror the conventional string order, Dizz played a right-handed guitar upside down, thereby reversing the order of the strings. After his discharge in 1956, he moved first to Detroit and then to Chicago, where he settled permanently. In Chicago he played under the guidance of Lacy Gibson and Earl Hooker. He was proficient enough to join Sonny Thompson's band in 1958. He also worked with Junior Cannady and John Lee Hooker. In a major career move in 1964, he became a member of Junior Wells's backing ensemble. They toured around the world until 1971, when Dizz joined Hound Dog Taylor and the HouseRockers. He remained a member of that band until Taylor's death in 1975. He then formed the band Shock Treatment, and with this ensemble he further developed his flamboyant performing act, which included raunchy jokes as well as his showy but skillful guitar playing. His pleasant, jocular character was complemented by his intelligence; he received a degree in economics from Southern Illinois University.

Dizz performed at Chicago clubs, such as the Kingston Mines, B.L.U.E.S. and the Checkerboard Lounge, and toured internationally. His playing was witnessed by members of the Rolling Stones and Foghat. He played on the recording of Live at the Checkerboard Lounge, Chicago 1981 with Muddy Waters and Rolling Stones Mick Jagger, Keith Richards and Ron Wood. His studio recordings did not capture the essence of his live performances.

Dizz died of effects of esophageal cancer on September 7, 1993, at the age of 56.

== Discography ==
Year	Title	Record label
1979	Somebody Stole My Christmas	Isabel Records
1979	Lefty Dizz feat. Big Moose Walker	Black & Blue Records
1982	Lefty Dizz and Shock Treatment Live in Chicago	Independent
1982	Lefty Dizz and Shock Treatment Live at the Kingston Mines, Volume 1	Independent
1983	Lefty Dizz and Shock Treatment Live at the Kingston Mines, Volume 2	Independent
1985	Bad Avenue feat. T-Bone Pegues	Xalapeno Musicworks
1995	Ain't It Nice to Be Loved	JSP Records
2002	Walked All Night Long with Louisiana Red – originally recorded in 1976	The Blues Alliance
2007	The Healer, Carlos Johnson & Lefty Dizz	Wolf Records

== See also ==
- List of Chicago blues musicians
- List of electric blues musicians
- List of musicians who play left-handed

== Bibliography ==
- The Penguin Guide to Blues Recordings
