= Come to Papa (album) =

Come To Papa

Studio album by Carl Weathersby
- Released: 2000
- Recorded: December 1999
- Genre: blues
- Label: Evidence Records
- Producer: John Snyder

Professional ratings
Review scores
Source	Rating
The Penguin Guide to Blues Recordings	4/4 stars

Come To Papa is a blues album by Carl Weathersby. It was released in 2000 on the Evidence Records. It was produced by John Snyder and recorded December 18–21, 1999 at Sounds Unreel in Memphis, Tennessee.

== Track listing ==
- 01. "Come To Papa" (Willie Mitchell/Earl Randle) - 4:36
- 02. "Leap Of Faith" (Gary Nicholson/Glen Clark) - 4:03
- 03. "Love, Lead Us Home" (Tommy Malone/Pat McLaughlin/Johnny Ray Allen/Kenneth Blevins) - 5:03
- 04. "You Better Think About It" (Rico McFarland) - 5:05
- 05. "(I Feel Like) Breakin' Up Somebody's Home" (Al Jackson, Jr./Timothy Matthews) - 4:39
- 06. "Walking The Back Streets And Cryin'" (Sandy Jones) - 6:56
- 07. "My Baby" (Carl Weathersby) - 4:56
- 08. "Floodin' In California" (Albert King) - 3:48
- 09. "A Good Man Is Hard To Find" (Steven Washington Lucky Peterson) - 4:41
- 10. "Help Me Somebody" (Jon Cleary) - 5:46
- 11. "Danger All About" (Carl Weathersby) - 4:37
- 12. "Drifting Blues" (Johnny Moore/Edward Williams/Charles Brown) - 7:28

== Personnel ==
- Carl Weathersby - vocals, guitar
- Lucky Peterson - Hammond B-3 organ, Wurlitzer piano, clavinet
- Rico McFarland - rhythm guitar
- Willie Weeks - bass
- Steve Potts - drums
- The Memphis Horns (Wayne Jackson & Andrew Love) - horns
- Ann Peebles - vocal on "Come To Papa"
- John Carlyle - background vocal on "My Baby"
- Harold Chandler - background vocal on "My Baby"
