= David Maxwell (musician) =

American songwriter (1943–2015)

- Born: March 10, 1943; Waltham, Massachusetts, United States
- Died: February 13, 2015 (aged 71) Boston, Massachusetts, United States
- Genres: Blues
- Occupations: Pianist, songwriter, singer
- Years active: 1960s–2015

David Maxwell (March 10, 1943 – February 13, 2015) was an American blues pianist, songwriter, and singer.

Over his lengthy career, Maxwell variously worked with Louisiana Red, Muddy Waters, Skip James, Bonnie Raitt, John Lee Hooker, James Cotton, Levon Helm, Buddy Guy, Jimmy Rogers, Charlie Musselwhite, Johnny Adams, Ronnie Earl, Freddie King and Hubert Sumlin. He also released a number of albums under his own name. Maxwell was nominated for a Blues Music Award in 2015 in the category Pinetop Perkins Piano Player, which was ultimately won by Marcia Ball.

== Biography ==
Maxwell was born in Waltham, Massachusetts. He was educated at the University of Rochester and Eastman School of Music. he became friends with Alan "Blind Owl" Wilson in high school, and they played together at several local engagements. Maxwell became part of the local blues scene in Boston in the late 1960s, having been initially inspired by the piano stylings of Otis Spann, Sunnyland Slim, Pinetop Perkins, Big Maceo Merriweather, Ray Charles and Memphis Slim. He also met and befriended Spann about this time.

In the early part of the 1970s, Maxwell came to the attention of the guitarist Freddie King and supplied his piano accompaniment for a couple of years. He worked backing Bonnie Raitt in 1974 and 1975 and James Cotton from 1977 to 1979. In the 1980s he returned to Boston and formed David Maxwell and the Blues Wizards. He toured and recorded with Otis Rush in the 1990s, having built up his reputation by further interim work with other musicians, including John Lee Hooker, Jimmy Rogers, Paul Oscher, Hubert Sumlin, Bob Margolin, John Primer and Ronnie Earl (from 1990 to 1992). Maxwell played on Cotton's 1997 Grammy Award–winning album Deep in the Blues. Maxwell earlier performed on the soundtrack to the film Fried Green Tomatoes (1991).

Maxwell debut solo album, Maximum Blues Piano, released by in Tone-Cool Records in 1997, included backing by Ronnie Earl and Duke Levine on guitar. In a review of the largely instrumental album, AllMusic noted that "Echoes of all of his influences can be heard throughout the tracks, including Pete Johnson on "Down at A.J.'s Place," and Otis Spann on "Deep Into It." His follow-up recording, Max Attack (2003), was re-released on 95 North Records in 2005. Maxwell appeared at the Ottawa Bluesfest in 2009.

Collaborative work with Louisiana Red and Otis Spann resulted in You Got to Move (2009) and Conversations in Blue (2010), respectively. Maxwell won Blues Music Awards in the category Best Acoustic Album for both of these recordings and was nominated for another in 2015 in the category Pinetop Perkins Piano Player. His final recording, Blues in Other Colors (2012), received acclaim for the fusion of traditional blues using non-Western instruments, along with elements of world music.

== Death ==
Maxwell died in Massachusetts General Hospital from prostate cancer in February 2015, aged 71.

== Discography ==
=== Albums ===
Year	Title	Record label
1997	Maximum Blues Piano	Tone-Cool Records
2003	Max Attack	Blue Max Records
2005	Max Attack (reissue)	95 North Records
2009	You Got to Move, with Louisiana Red	Blue Max Records
2010	Conversations in Blue, with Otis Spann	Circumstantial Productions
2012	Blues in Other Colors	Shining Stone Records
