= Alsip, Hazelgreen, Oak Lawn School District 126 =

School district in Illinois, United States

Coordinates: 41.676°N 87.731°W

Address
- 11900 South Kostner Avenue Alsip, Illinois, 60803; United States

District information
- Type: Public
- Grades: PreK–8
- NCES District ID: 1703480

Students and staff
- Students: 1,566

Other information
- Website: www.dist126.org

Alsip, Hazelgreen, Oak Lawn School District 126 is a school district headquartered in Alsip, Illinois, in the Chicago metropolitan area. The district headquarters, the Powers Wassberg Lehman Administrative Center, are within Prairie Junior High School.

The district serves all or portions of Alsip and Oak Lawn.

== Schools ==
- Prairie Junior High School
- Elementary schools:
  - Hazelgreen Elementary School
  - Lane Elementary School
  - Stony Creek Elementary School
