= Travelin' Light (Zora Young album) =

Studio album by Zora Young
- Released: 1992
- Recorded: September 1991
- Studio: Tundra
- Genre: Blues
- Label: Deluge
- Producer: Randy Labbe

Zora Young chronology
Stumbling Blocks and Stepping Stones (1983)	Travelin' Light (1992)	Learned My Lesson (2000)

Travelin' Light is an album by the American musician Zora Young. Young supported the album by playing shows with her band, the Blues Posse.

== Production ==
The album was produced by Randy Labbe. Young wrote the majority of its songs, many of which address the concerns of her female listeners. Pinetop Perkins played piano. Colin Linden played guitar. The album contains covers of "Key to the Highway" and "Queen Bee". "Stumbling Blocks and Stepping Stones" is a new version of a song Young had previously recorded.

== Critical reception ==
Professional ratings
Review scores
Source	Rating
AllMusic	4/5 stars
The Buffalo News	3.5/5 stars
The Encyclopedia of Popular Music	3/5 stars
The Penguin Guide to Blues Recordings	3/4 stars

The Edmonton Journal wrote that Young "infuses Chicago style blues with conviction, gospel influences and dead on timing," and called the songs "really pungent poetic gems not without her own sense of wit." The Washington Post determined that "in addition to her commanding and heartfelt vocals, Young contributes a series of songs to the album that have a decidedly personal and sometimes defiant edge."

AllMusic wrote: "With the focus on Young's brassy original material, this is one modern blues album that's a winner all the way."

== Track listing ==
No.	Title	Length
1.	"Daughter of a Son-of-a-Gun"
2.	"Travelin' Light"
3.	"Girlfriend"
4.	"Queen Bee"
5.	"Key to the Highway"
6.	"Stumbling Blocks and Stepping Stones"
7.	"Country Girl Returns"
8.	"Football Widow"
9.	"Brain Damage"
10.	"Dirty Mama Jama"
