= Willie Kent =

Willie Kent (February 24, 1936 – March 2, 2006) was an American Chicago blues singer, bassist and songwriter.

== Career ==
Kent was born in Inverness, Sunflower County, Mississippi. Although he had played the bass guitar in Chicago's clubs since the 1950s, Kent worked full-time in careers other than music until he was over 50 years of age. Following heart surgery, he stopped work as a truck driver, and formed a band. In 1971, Kent took up residence at Ma Bea's Lounge in West Madison, Chicago. The house band became known as Sugar Bear and the Beehives, headed by Kent (the Sugar Bear) with guitarist Willie James Lyons and drummer Robert Plunkett. For the next six years, this troupe backed visiting musicians, such as Fenton Robinson, Hubert Sumlin, Eddy Clearwater, Jimmy Johnson, Carey Bell, Buster Benton, John Littlejohn, Casey Jones, and Mighty Joe Young. The house band's proficient playing led to their recording a live album in October 1975 at Ma Bea's, billed as Ghetto.

Kent continued to play live shows, even after being diagnosed with colon cancer in early 2005. He died in Englewood, Illinois in March 2006.

== Discography ==
- 1975 – Ghetto (Storyville Records)
- 1989 – I'm What You Need (Big Boy Records)
- 1991 – Ain't It Nice (Delmark Records)
- 1991 – King of Chicago's West Side Blues (Wolf Records)
- 1993 – Live at B.L.U.E.S. in Chicago (Wolf Records)
- 1994 – Too Hurt to Cry (Delmark Records)
- 1995 – Blues and Trouble (Isabel Records)
- 1996 – Long Way to Ol' Miss (Delmark Records)
- 1998 – Everybody Needs Somebody (Wolf Records)
- 1998 – Make Room for the Blues (Delmark Records)
- 1998 – Who's Been Talking with Lil' Ed Williams (Earwig Music Company)
- 2001 – Comin' Alive! (Blue Chicago Records)

== Awards and honors ==
- W.C. Handy Awards: Best Blues Instrumentalist, Bass 1995, 1997, 1998, 1999, 2000, 2001, 2002, 2003, 2004, and 2005
- Critics' Choice: Most Outstanding Blues Musician, Bass from Living Blues magazine (1995, 1996, 1997, 1998, 1999, 2001)
- Readers' Choice: Album of the Year 2001 from Soul Bag magazine, France, for Comin' Alive
- Critics' Choice: Album of the Year 2001 from Soul Bag magazine, France, for Comin' Alive
- France Blues Award: Best Blues Musician, Bass for the years 2002, 2003
- Chicago's Album of the Year 1998: for Make Room for the Blues
- Library of Congress' Best Blues Recording of the Year 1991: for Ain't It Nice
