= Carlos Johnson (blues musician) =

American blues guitarist and singer (born 1948)

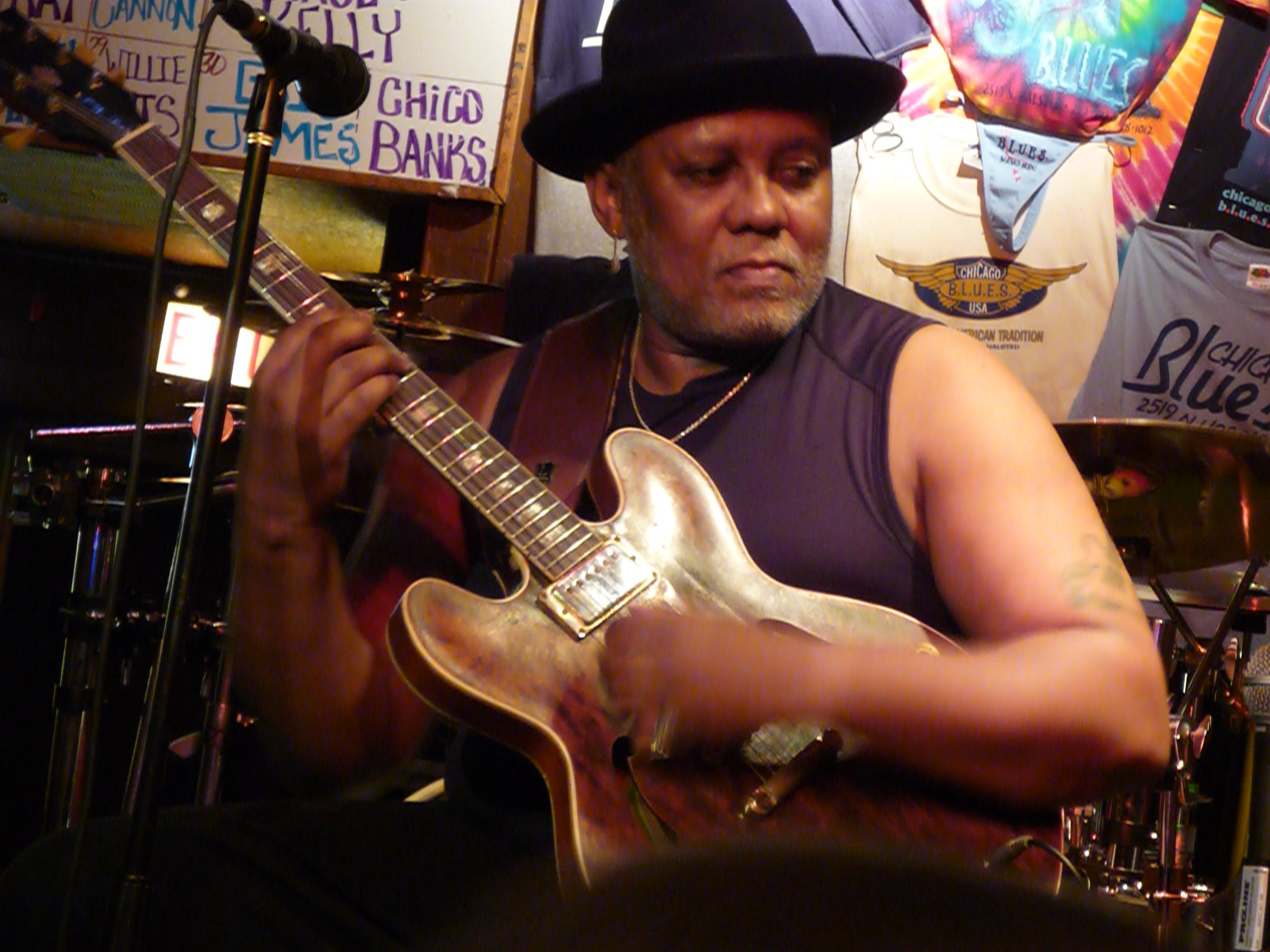
- Carlos Johnson (2008)

Background information
- Born: January 17, 1948 (age 77); Chicago, Illinois, United States
- Genres: Blues
- Occupation(s): Guitarist, singer
- Instrument(s): Guitar, vocals
- Years active: 1970s–present
- Labels: Blues Special, Mr. Kelly's, P-Vine

Carlos Johnson (born January 17, 1953) is an American blues guitarist and singer. He is left-handed, but plays a right-handed instrument upside-down like players such as Otis Rush, Albert King, and Jimi Hendrix. Johnson is known for his aggressive playing which has attracted audiences in Chicago blue scene since the 1970s. He has played on recordings of notable musicians including Billy Branch & The Sons of Blues and Son Seals.

== Biography ==
Johnson was born in Chicago, Illinois, United States. In 1989, he made his first tour to Japan with Valerie Wellington, and caught attention of the Japanese blues fans. He revisited the country in 2004 as a supporting guitarist for Otis Rush who became unable to play the guitar due to the stroke he suffered earlier that year. These concerts helped him build a fan base in Japan.

Though he has been active since the 1970s, he had to wait until 2000 to release an album under his own name. That year saw the release of his debut CD My Name Is Carlos Johnson recorded in Buenos Aires, Argentina from local Blues Special label. He was featured on Billy Branch 's CD Billy Branch & The Sons of Blues featuring Carlos Johnson released in 2002. Johnson also made an album as a duo with Branch titled Don't Mess with the Bluesmen in 2004. Another CD In and Out from Mr. Kelly's Records followed the same year. In 2007, he released a live album Live at B.L.U.E.S. on Halsted recorded in Chicago.

He toured Japan as a solo artist in 2007 and 2009.

== Discography ==
- 2001: My Name is Carlos Johnson (Blues Special Records)
- 2004: Don't Mess with the Bluesmen (P-Vine) (duo with Billy Branch)
- 2004: In And Out (Mr. Kelly's)
- 2007: Live At B.L.U.E.S. on Halsted (P-Vine)
- 2009: Encore! Live At B.L.U.E.S. On Halsted (P-Vine)

== Filmography ==
- 2008: Live At B.L.U.E.S. On Halsted (P-Vine)
