= Billy Branch =

American harmonica player (born 1951)

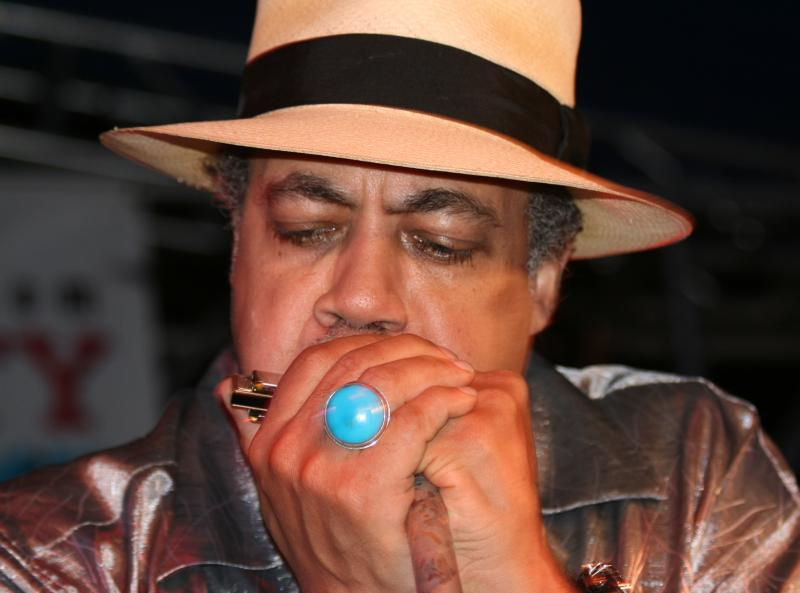
- Branch at the Legendary Rhythm and Blues Cruise, 2008

Background information
- Born: William Earl Branch; October 3, 1951 (age 74); Great Lakes, Illinois, U.S.
- Genres: Chicago blues
- Occupation: Musician
- Instrument: Harmonica
- Years active: 1970s–present

William Earl Branch (born October 3, 1951) is an American blues harmonica player of Chicago blues. He is a three-time Grammy nominee, a retired two-term governor of the Chicago Grammy Chapter, an Emmy Award winner, and a winner of the Addy Award. In addition, he has received numerous humanitarian and music awards.

== Early life and career ==
Branch was born at the Great Lakes Naval Hospital in North Chicago, Illinois, United States. His family moved from Chicago to Los Angeles when he was five years old. At ten years of age he bought his first harmonica at a Los Angeles Woolworth store. He immediately began playing simple tunes and melodies. After that initial purchase, Billy was never without a harmonica. In 1969 he moved back to Chicago to attend the University of Illinois. eventually he graduated from UIC with a Bachelor of Science degree in Political Science University of Illinois at Chicago.

In August 1969, Branch attended the first Chicago Blues Festival, which was produced by Willie Dixon. Six years later, after graduating from the University of Illinois, he was touring with the Chicago Blues All-Stars, led by Dixon. Branch soon took the place of Carey Bell, Dixon's long time Harp player, when Bell left the All-Stars to form his own band.

In the 1970s, Branch founded his own group, the Sons of Blues, with Lurrie Bell (the son of Carey Bell) on guitar and Freddie Dixon (the son of Willie Dixon) on bass guitar. They recorded for Alligator Records and, after a change in personnel, for Red Beans Records. The new band consisted of Carlos Johnson on guitar and J. W. Williams on vocals and bass guitar. Branch has also recorded for Verve Records and Evidence Records.

Since then, Branch has played on over 250 different recordings, including 12 under his own name. He has recorded with Willie Dixon, Keb Mo, Johnny Winter, Lou Rawls, Koko Taylor, Eddy Clearwater, Honeyboy Edwards, Syl Johnson, Lurrie Bell, Ronnie Baker Brooks, and Taj Mahal. He has received three Grammy nominations (losing one nomination to B.B. King and Eric Clapton). He served two consecutive terms on the Grammy Board of Governors and currently is chairman of the Grammy Blues Committee. He has won multiple Blues Music Awards, an Emmy Award, an Addy Award, two Chicago Music Awards, and numerous humanitarian and achievement awards. The 2007 Chicago Blues Festival honored the 30th anniversary of Billy Branch and the Sons of Blues. Likewise, in 2017 the Chicago Blues Fest celebrated the 40th anniversary of Billy Branch and the SOBs.

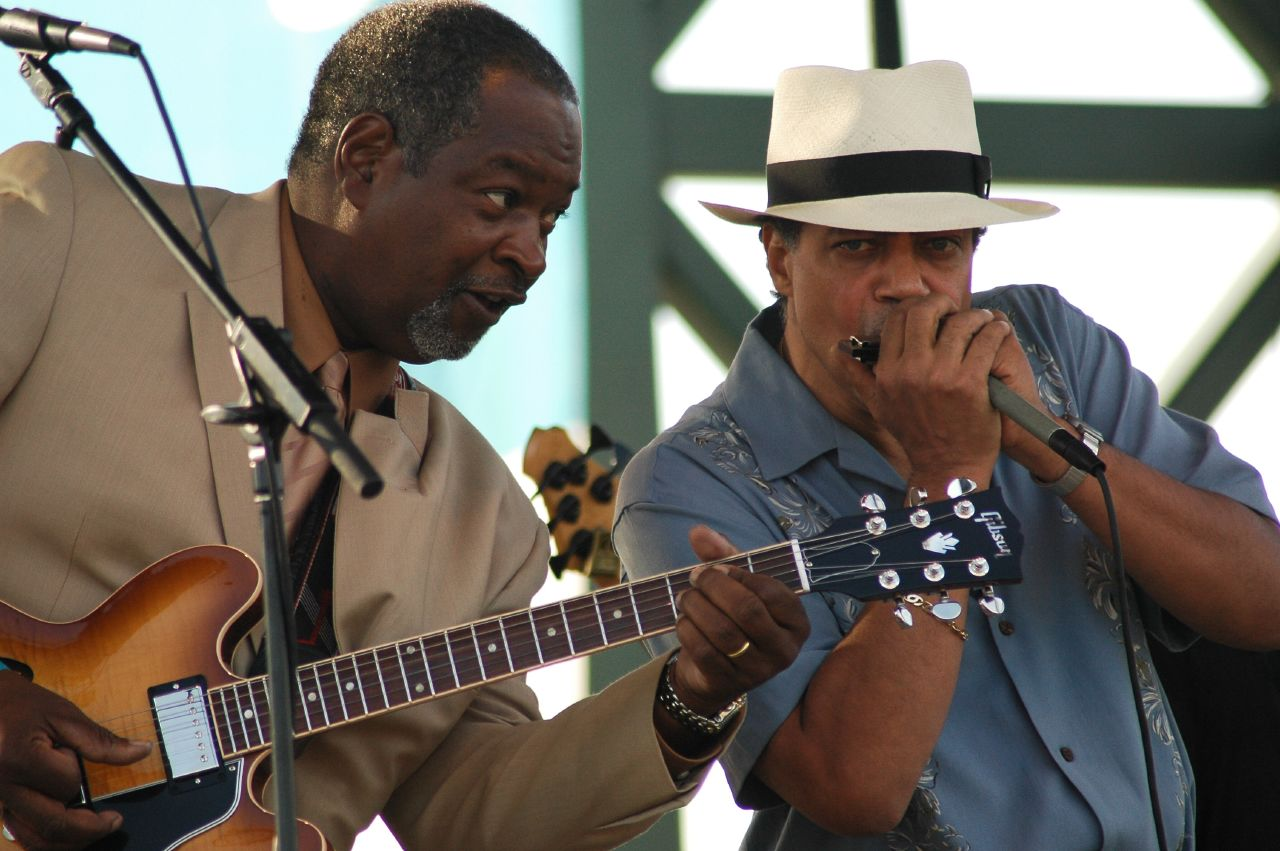
Carl Weathersby and Branch at the Arkansas Blues and Heritage Festival

Branch annually appears at major festivals around the world, including the Montreux Blues Festival, the North Sea Blues Festival, the Cognac Blues Festivals and Long Beach Blues Festival, the Chicago Blues Festival, the San Francisco Blues Festival and the North Sea Jazz Festival.

The current lineup of the Sons of Blues consists of Branch (harmonica and vocals), Andrew "Blaze" Thomas (drums and vocals), Sumito Ariyoshi (keyboards and vocals), Marvin Little (bass and vocals), and Giles Corey (guitar and vocals).

His 2019 recording, Roots and Branches: The Songs of Little Walter, was chosen as a 'Favorite Blues Album' by AllMusic.

He can also be seen in several Playing for Change music clips.

== See also ==
- List of Chicago blues musicians
- List of electric blues musicians
- List of harmonica blues musicians
