= Alsip, Illinois =

- Village
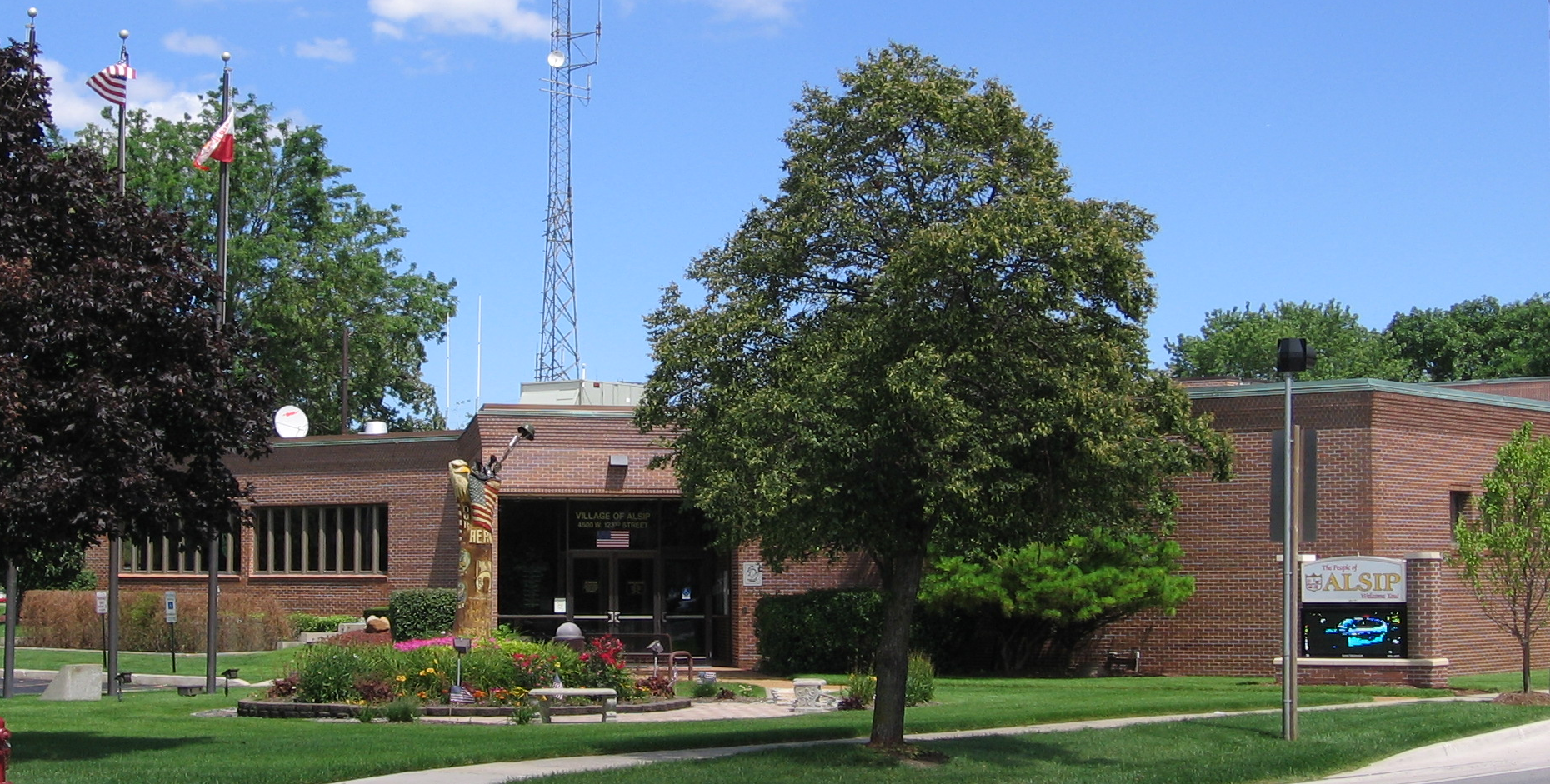
- Alsip Village Hall

- Flag Seal
- Interactive map of Alsip, Illinois
- Location within Greater Chicago Location within Illinois Location within the United States
- Coordinates: 41°40′14″N 87°43′56″W
- Country: United States
- State: Illinois
- County: Cook
- Township: Worth
- Incorporated: 1927

Government
  - Type: Mayor–council
  - Mayor: John D. Ryan

Area
  - Total: 6.63 sq mi (17.16 km^{2})
  - Land: 6.53 sq mi (16.90 km^{2})
  - Water: 0.10 sq mi (0.26 km^{2}) 1.54%

Population (2020)
  - Total: 19,063
  - Density: 2,921.4/sq mi (1,127.97/km^{2})

Standard of living (2007-11)
  - Per capita income: $25,286
  - Median home value: $202,100
- ZIP code(s): 60803
- Area code(s): 708/464
- Geocode: 01010
- FIPS code: 17-01010
- Website: villageofalsip.org

Alsip is a village in Cook County, Illinois, United States. The population was 19,063 at the 2020 census. It is a south suburb of the Chicago metropolitan area.

Alsip was settled in the 1830s by German and Dutch farmers. The village is named after Frank Alsip, the owner of a brickyard that opened there in 1885. The village began to grow after the Tri-State Tollway was built there in 1959.

== Geography ==
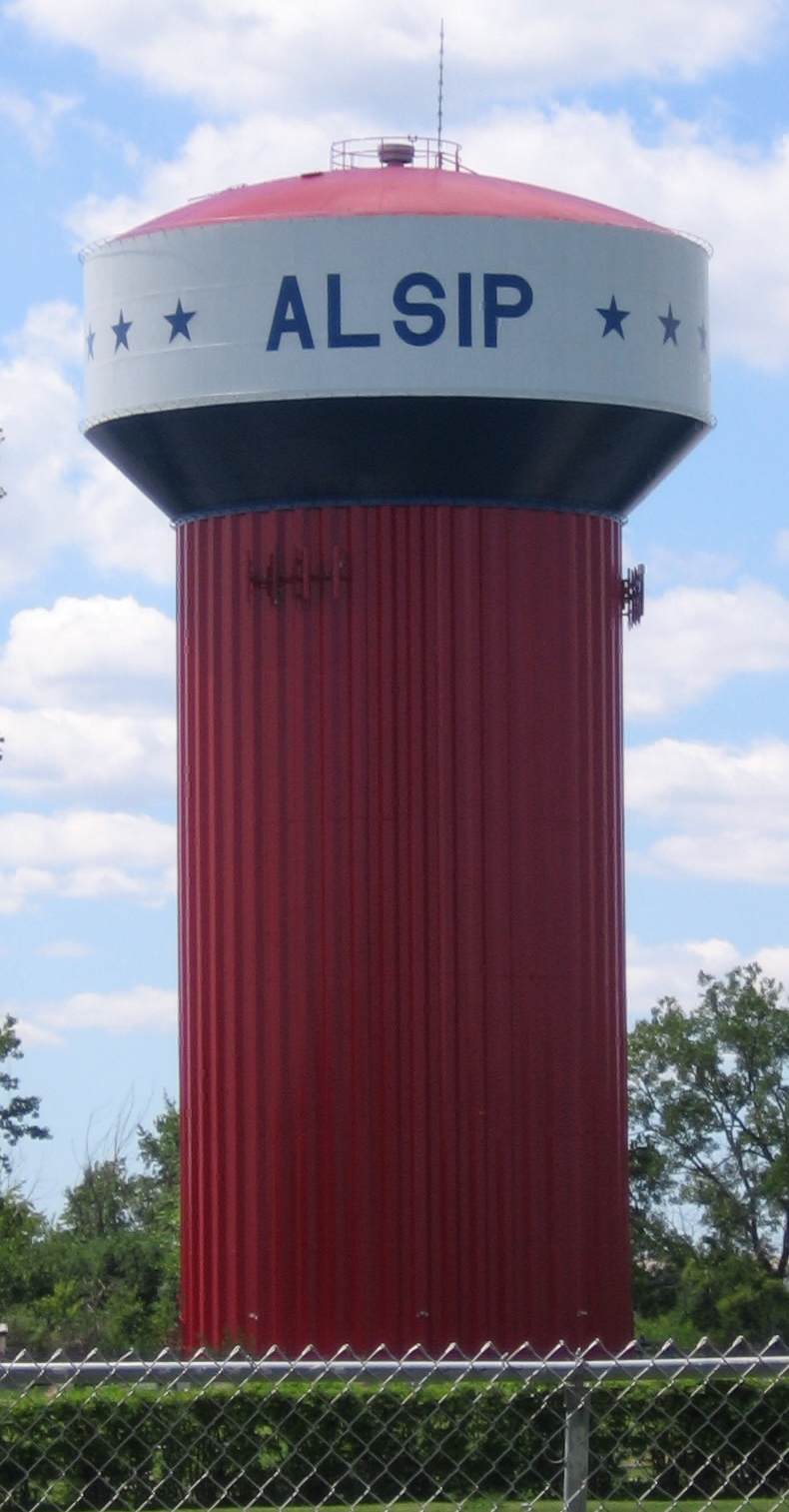
One of two water towers with dark red color and fluted shafts, visible to travelers on I-294

Alsip is located at 41°40′14″N 87°43′56″W (41.670433, -87.732199).

According to the 2021 census gazetteer files, Alsip has an area of 6.63 square miles (17.17 km^{2}), of which 6.53 square miles (16.91 km^{2}) (or 98.49%) is land and 0.10 square miles (0.26 km^{2}) (or 1.51%) is water.

Alsip is bordered to the west by the villages of Worth and Palos Heights. To the south is Crestwood. Oak Lawn lies to the north. Merrionette Park, Blue Island, and Robbins lie to the east (north-south, respectively). The Mount Greenwood neighborhood of Chicago lies to the north and east.

Most of the town lies to the north of the Cal-Sag Channel. However, Chippewa Ridge subdivision, which was built upon the former Alsip Nursery, lies southwest of the Cal-Sag. In conjunction with the Illinois Department of Natural Resources and the Water Reclamation District of Chicago, the village operates a boat launch on the canal, permitting inland access to Lake Michigan.

The Alsip area is home to two predominantly African-American cemeteries, Burr Oak and Restvale cemeteries, which are the resting places of many Chicago blues musicians (including Muddy Waters, Willie Dixon and Dinah Washington), athletes (Jimmie Crutchfield), and other celebrities. Emmett Till, whose murder in Mississippi at age 14 in 1955 was an important moment in the Civil Rights Movement, is buried at Burr Oak. In 2004, that cemetery was covered in the national media when the murder investigation was re-opened, and Till's body was exhumed.

Six years later, on July 9, 2010, Cook County Sheriff Tom Dart alleged that four workers at Burr Oak cemetery dug up more than 200 graves, dumped the bodies into unmarked mass graves, and resold the plots to unsuspecting members of the public. The three men and one woman were charged and convicted with one count each of dismembering a human body.

== Demographics ==
Historical population
| Census | Pop. | Note | %± |
|---|---|---|---|
| 1930 | 327 | | — |
| 1940 | 541 | | 65.4% |
| 1950 | 1,228 | | 127.0% |
| 1960 | 3,770 | | 207.0% |
| 1970 | 11,608 | | 207.9% |
| 1980 | 17,134 | | 47.6% |
| 1990 | 18,227 | | 6.4% |
| 2000 | 19,725 | | 8.2% |
| 2010 | 19,277 | | −2.3% |
| 2020 | 19,063 | | −1.1% |
U.S. Decennial Census; 2010 2020

=== Racial and ethnic composition ===
Alsip village, Illinois – Racial and ethnic composition Note: the US Census treats Hispanic/Latino as an ethnic category. This table excludes Latinos from the racial categories and assigns them to a separate category. Hispanics/Latinos may be of any race.
| Race / Ethnicity (NH = Non-Hispanic) | Pop 2000 | Pop 2010 | Pop 2020 | % 2000 | % 2010 | % 2020 |
|---|---|---|---|---|---|---|
| White alone (NH) | 15,122 | 11,272 | 8,895 | 76.66% | 58.47% | 46.66% |
| Black or African American alone (NH) | 1,982 | 3,451 | 4,235 | 10.05% | 17.90% | 22.22% |
| Native American or Alaska Native alone (NH) | 25 | 18 | 8 | 0.13% | 0.09% | 0.04% |
| Asian alone (NH) | 411 | 434 | 359 | 2.08% | 2.25% | 1.88% |
| Pacific Islander alone (NH) | 5 | 5 | 8 | 0.03% | 0.03% | 0.04% |
| Other race alone (NH) | 33 | 26 | 50 | 0.17% | 0.13% | 0.26% |
| Mixed race or Multiracial (NH) | 420 | 229 | 452 | 2.13% | 1.19% | 2.37% |
| Hispanic or Latino (any race) | 1,727 | 3,842 | 5,056 | 8.76% | 19.93% | 26.52% |
| Total | 19,725 | 19,277 | 19,063 | 100.00% | 100.00% | 100.00% |

=== 2020 census ===
As of the 2020 census, Alsip had a population of 19,063. The population density was 2,877.43 inhabitants per square mile (1,110.98/km^{2}).

100.0% of residents lived in urban areas, while 0.0% lived in rural areas.

The median age was 39.4 years. 21.5% of residents were under the age of 18 and 16.3% of residents were 65 years of age or older. For every 100 females there were 90.4 males, and for every 100 females age 18 and over there were 87.9 males age 18 and over.

There were 7,692 households in Alsip, including 4,455 family households, of which 28.5% had children under the age of 18 living in them. Of all households, 38.9% were married-couple households, 19.9% were households with a male householder and no spouse or partner present, and 34.5% were households with a female householder and no spouse or partner present. About 33.1% of all households were made up of individuals and 14.5% had someone living alone who was 65 years of age or older.

There were 8,016 housing units, of which 4.0% were vacant. The homeowner vacancy rate was 1.4% and the rental vacancy rate was 4.9%.

=== 2000 census ===
The top five non-African American, non-Hispanic ancestries reported in Alsip as of the 2000 census were Irish (17.1%), German (14.0%), Polish (9.7%), Italian (4.8%) and English (3.5%).

=== Income and poverty ===
The median income for a household in the village was $58,768, and the median income for a family was $72,444. Males had a median income of $48,254 versus $36,313 for females. The per capita income for the village was $30,308. About 7.7% of families and 7.7% of the population were below the poverty line, including 4.0% of those under age 18 and 11.3% of those age 65 or over.

The municipal logo for the Village of Alsip; it denotes the importance of industry and education, as well as transportation and community unity.

== Government ==
Most of Alsip is in Illinois's 1st congressional district; the portion north of 115th Street, and the city block northeast of 119th Street and Lawndale Avenue, are in the 3rd district.

Policy-making and legislative authority are vested in the governing Village Board consisting of the Village President, often referred to as the Mayor, and six Trustees, and a Village Clerk. The Village Clerk is an ex officio member of the Board and does not vote. All Board members are elected at large. All Board members serve four-year terms, with the Village President, the Village Clerk, and three Trustees elected usually on the first Tuesday in April following Presidential election year, while the other three Trustees are usually elected on the first Tuesday in April two years later. Beginning with those elected in the April 4, 2017 election, no person may hold the office of Village President, Village Clerk, or Village Trustee for more than three consecutive four-year terms.

The current Village government, as of May 2019 (with the year their term ends):

- Mayor: John D. Ryan (2021)
- Clerk: Susan M. Petzel (2021)
- Trustee: Richard S. Dalzell (2023)
- Trustee: Christine L. McLawhorn (2023)
- Trustee: Christopher W. Murphy (2023)
- Trustee: Michael J. Zielinski (2021)
- Trustee: Monica M. Juarez (2021)
- Trustee: Catalina Nava-Esparza (2021) (Elected to a two-year term to fill the remaining term of Trustee who resigned)

Each trustee and the mayor serve on one or more committees or commissions which oversee government functions. The individual assignments are available at the village website.

There are also a finance director who helps guide the government on fiduciary matters and a law firm that serves as the village attorneys to guide the government on legal matters.

=== Mayors ===
- Gustave Termunde (1927–33)
- Leonard Holmberg (1933–36)
- John Benck (1936–56)
- John J. Alsterda (1956–61)
- Raymond L. Termunde (1961–73)
- Arnold A. Andrews (1973–2005)
- Patrick E. Kitching (2005–2016)
- John D. Ryan (2017–Present)

== Education ==
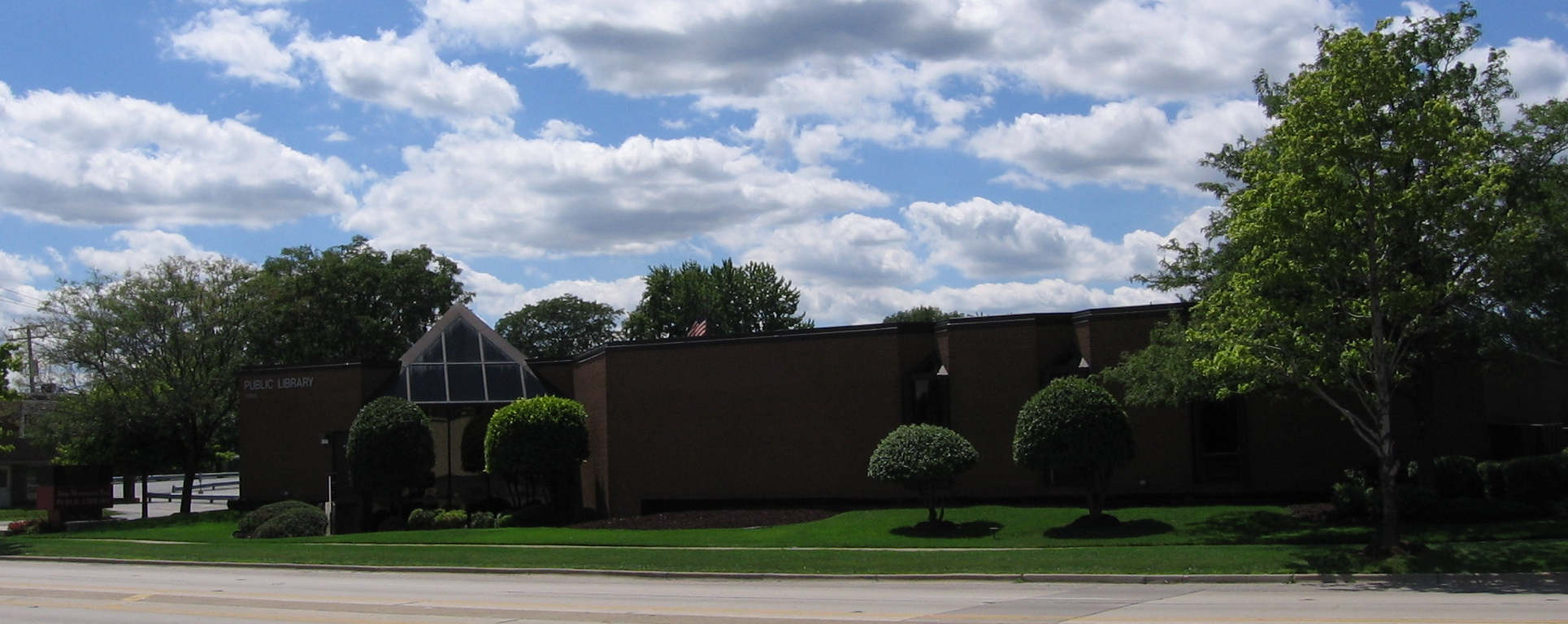
The public library district combines the municipalities of Alsip and neighboring Merrionette Park, though the library is located in Alsip on Pulaski Road.

Elementary school districts

- Alsip-Hazelgreen-Oaklawn School District 126
  - Prairie Junior High School in Alsip
- Atwood Heights School District 125
  - Lawn Manor Elementary School in Oak Lawn
  - Meadow Lane Intermediate School in Alsip
  - Hamlin Junior High School in Alsip
- Cook County School District 130

Secondary School District

- Community High School District 218

Community college

- Moraine Valley Community College

Private schools

- Marist High School, a coed Catholic school in Chicago affiliated with the Marist Brothers
- Brother Rice High School, an all-male Catholic school in Chicago affiliated with the Congregation of Christian Brothers
- Mother McAuley Liberal Arts High School, an all-female Catholic school in Chicago affiliated with the Sisters of Mercy
- Chicago Christian High School

== Business and industry ==
Alsip is home to the international headquarters of Griffith Laboratories.

One of the two Chicago area Coca-Cola bottling plants is located in Alsip.

Alsip is home to Alsip MiniMill, a producer of corrugating medium using Old Corrugated Containers (OCC) as the primary raw material.

== Transportation ==
Pace provides bus service on routes 383 and 385 connecting Alsip to destinations across the Southland.
