= Topsy Turvy (Guitar Shorty album) =

Studio album by Guitar Shorty
- Released: 1993
- Genre: Blues; Blues rock
- Length: 50:08
- Label: Black Top

Guitar Shorty chronology
My Way or the Highway (1991)	Topsy Turvy (1993)	Get Wise to Yourself (1995)

Professional ratings
Review scores
Source	Rating
AllMusic	4.5/5 stars

Topsy Turvy is the second studio album released by blues guitarist Guitar Shorty. The album was released in 1993 on CD by the label Black Top. The tracks "I'm So Glad I Met You", "Mean Husband Blues", "The Bottom Line" and "Hard Life" would later appear on Shorty's compilation album, The Best of Guitar Shorty, in 2006.

Recorded in the U.S., unlike his previous album, My Way or the Highway, the album shows that "it [is] clear that Guitar Shorty was back to stay stateside." AllMusic praises the album, calling it "more impressive than My Way or the Highway... thanks to superior production values and a better handle on his past."

== Track listing ==
1. "I'm So Glad I Met You" (Fran, Kearney) — 4:16
2. "I Just Can't Run Away from the Blues" (Fran, Kearney, Scott) — 4:25
3. "Mean Husband Blues" (Kearney, Pembroke) — 3:53
4. "The Bottom Line" (George Jackson, Wilie Mitchell, Earl Randle) — 3:52
5. "I Never Thought" (Kearney) — 2:36
6. "Hard Life" (Kearney) — 5:17
7. "Jody" (Kent Barker, Don Davis, James Skeet Wilson) — 4:43
8. "It All Went Down the Drain" (Earl King) — 4:49
9. "How Long Can It Last?" (Kearney) — 3:13
10. "Old Time Sake" (Kearney) — 4:16
11. "You Confuse Me" (Kearney) — 2:46
12. "More Than You'll Ever Know" (Al Kooper) — 6:02

== Personnel ==
- David Torkanowsky — organ
- Ernest Youngblood, Jr. — saxophone
- Clarence Hollimon, Derek O'Brien — guitar
- Guitar Shorty — guitar, vocals
- Mark "Kaz" Kazanoff — saxophone
- Sarah Brown, Lee Allen Zeno — bass
- Herman "Roscoe" Ernest III, George Rains — drums, percussion
- Floyd Domino — piano
- Carol Fran — vocals
- The Kamikaze Horns — horns
- Michael Mordecai — trombone
- Keith Winking — trumpet
