= Long Beach Blues Festival =

Music festival in California, US, 1980–2009

- Long Beach Blues Festival Logo (2007)
- Genre: Blues
- Dates: 2 days on Labor Day Weekend
- Locations: Long Beach, California, United States
- Years active: 1980 – 2009
- Website: http://www.jazzandblues.org/

The Long Beach Blues Festival, in Long Beach, California, United States, was established fully in 1980, and was one of the largest blues festivals and was the second oldest on the West Coast (first being the San Francisco Blues Festival). It was held on Saturday and Sunday of Labor Day weekend. For many years it was held on the athletic field on the California State University, Long Beach campus. The 2009 festival, the 30th annual, was held at Rainbow Lagoon in downtown Long Beach. The Festival went on hiatus in 2010, and has not been held since.

The festival was organized and used as a fundraiser by KKJZ, a publicly supported radio station on the CSULB campus broadcasting blues and jazz in Southern California.

== History ==
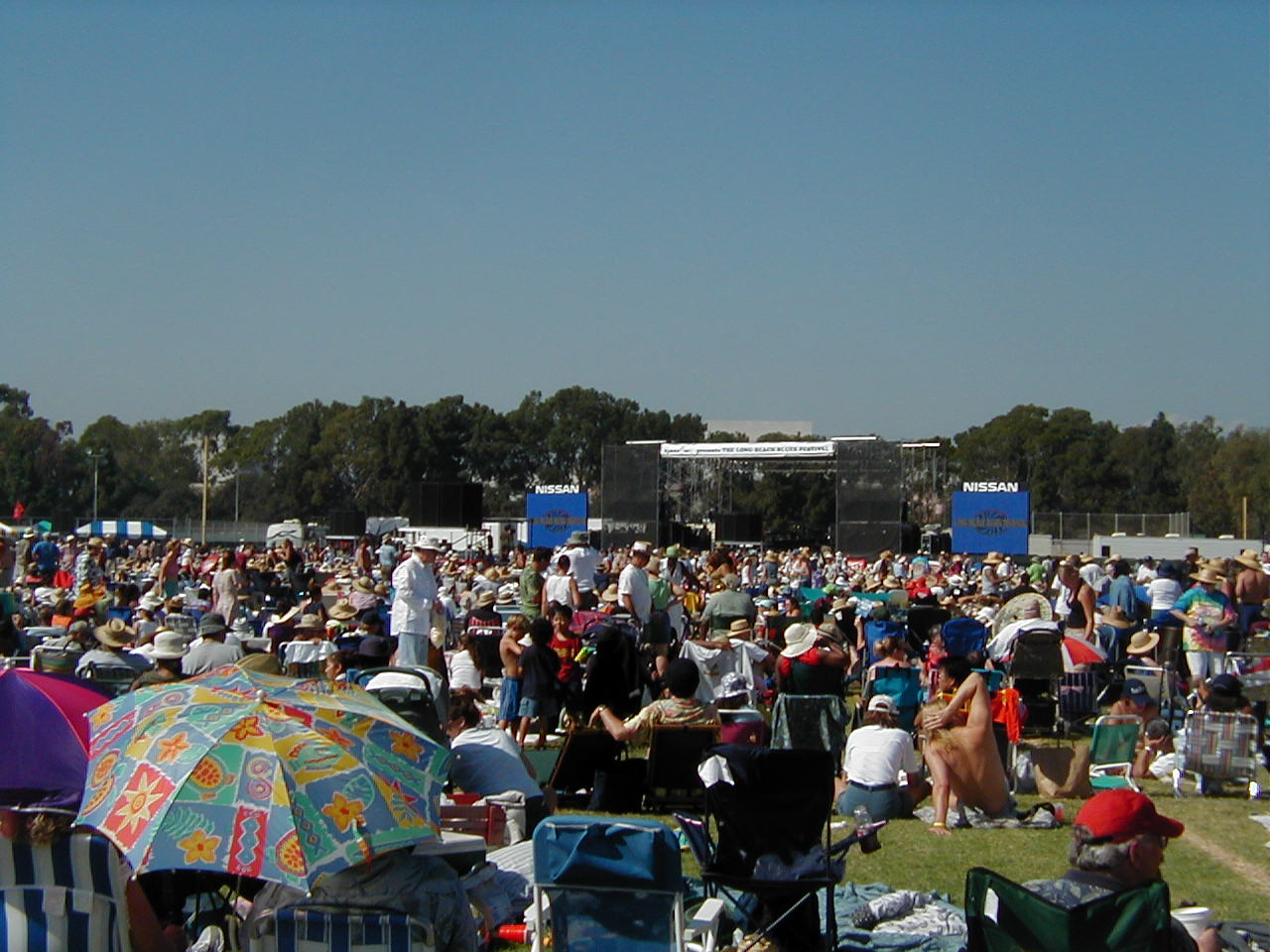
The former Festival Site at CSULB campus (2003)

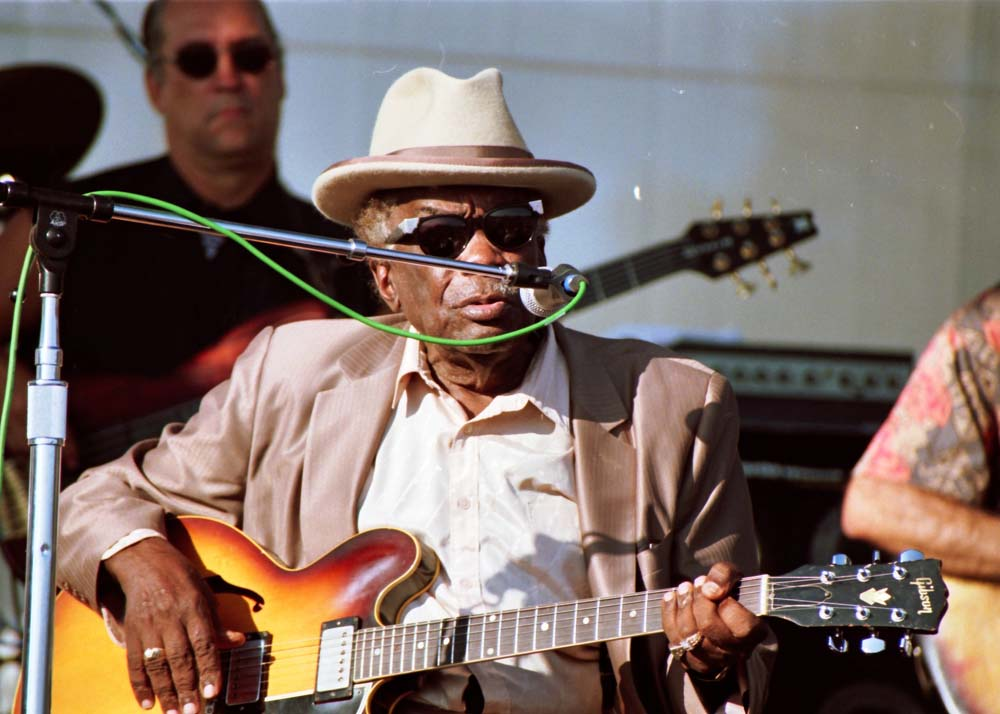
John Lee Hooker performing at the Long Beach Blues Festival, California, August 31, 1997

The Festival was set up in 1980 by jazz radio station KLON (later renamed to KKJZ) in Long Beach, California under the direction of Bernie Pearl, who was the host of a blues program "Nothing But The Blues" on KLON at the time. The first Festival was a one-day event titled the "KLON Blues & Gospel Festival" held at Veterans Stadium in Long Beach, drawing only a small crowd of 700, resulting in a loss of $7,000 for the radio station. The Festival grew larger each year, becoming a major fund raising event for KLON. From 1996 through 2000, KLON expanded the event to 3 days utilizing the entire Labor Day weekend. It went back to the 2-day event in 2001 because CSULB wanted Labor Day to clean up the field for their use in the new school semester. The Festival venue for the second Fest and thereafter was the North Athletic Field at Cal State University, Long Beach (CSULB), with the exception of 1992 which was held at Shoreline Aquatic Park in downtown Long Beach, and at Rainbow Lagoon in downtown Long Beach beginning in 2008 and 2009.

In 2010, the Blues Festival went on hiatus because of economic conditions and was replaced with a one-day 'Blues Bash', held at the Carpenter Performing Arts Center on the CSULB campus.

== Past festival lineups ==
- 1980: The Chambers Brothers, William Clarke Band, Pee Wee Crayton, Prince Dixon, Margie Evans, Lowell Fulson, C.C. Griffin, Blind Joe Hill, Hollywood Fats Band, Cleo Kennedy, Lee King Band, Doug MacLeod Band, Night Owls, George Smith, Finis Tasby, Big Joe Turner, Phillip Walker, Smokey Wilson
- 1981: Clifton Chenier, Albert Collins, Pee Wee Crayton, Margie Evans, Blind Joe Hill, George Smith, Eddie "Cleanhead" Vinson, Smokey Wilson
- 1982: Clarence "Gatemouth" Brown, Robert Cray, Johnny Littlejohn, Little Milton, Mighty Flyers with Rod Piazza, Johnny Otis Show, Esther Phillips, George Smith, Taj Mahal
- 1983: Bobby "Blue" Bland, Clifton Chenier, Johnny Copeland, Willie Dixon, Albert King, Jimmy McCracklin, Sonny Rhodes, Freddie Roulette, Koko Taylor
- 1984: Elvin Bishop, James Cotton, Pee Wee Crayton, Buddy Guy & Jr. Wells Band, John Lee Hooker, Etta James, B.B. King, Denise LaSalle, Brownie McGhee, Son Seals, Big Joe Turner, Jimmy Witherspoon
- 1985: Roomful of Blues, Otis Rush, Jimmy Smith, Lee Allen, Eddie "Cleanhead" Vinson, Linda Hopkins, Bo Diddley, The Blasters, Albert Collins, Papa John Creach, Joe Liggins & The Honeydrippers, Cash McCall Band, Charlie Musselwhite
- 1986: Big Twist and the Mellow Fellows, Guitar Showdown with Johnny Copeland, Buddy Guy & Matt "Guitar" Murphy, Super Harmonica Jam with James Cotton, Rod Piazza & Jr. Wells, Hank Crawford, Jimmy Johnson, Albert King, Robert Lockwood, Jr. & Pinetop Perkins, Little Milton, Rockin' Dopsie with Katie Webster, Koko Taylor
- 1987: Lonnie Brooks, Clarence "Gatemouth" Brown, Cephas & Wiggins, Jeannie & Jimmy Cheatham & The Sweet Baby Blues Band, Robert Cray, Snooks Eaglin, Etta James, B.B. King, Tony Matthews, Johnny Otis Show, Phillip Walker, Katie Webster
- 1988: Johnny Adams, Bobby "Blue" Bland, Ruth Brown, Albert Collins, James Cotton, Albert King, Kinsey Report with Big Daddy Kinsey, Lil' Ed & The Blues Imperials, Staple Singers, Johnnie Taylor, Walter "Wolfman" Washington
- 1989: Bobby "Blue" Bland, Charles Brown, Solomon Burke, Ronnie Earl & The Broadcasters, The Fabulous Thunderbirds, Grady Gaines & The Upsetters, Buddy Guy, John Hammond, John Lee Hooker, Johnny Shines, Terrance Simien & The Mallet Playboys, Koko Taylor
- 1990: Anson Funderburgh & The Rockets featuring Sam Myers, Ruth Brown, Albert Collins, Bo Diddley, Roy Gaines, Harmonica Fats (pseudonym for Harvey Blackston; 1927–2000) with the Bernie Pearl Blues Band, Etta James, Little Milton, Lonnie Mack, Yank Rachell, Otis Rush, Johnny Winter
- 1991: Blues Brothers Band with Steve Cropper, Donald "Duck" Dunn and Matt "Guitar" Murphy, Robert Cray Band with the Memphis Horns, Five Blind Boys of Alabama, John Lee Hooker, B. B. King, Big Jay McNeely with the Rocket 88's, Jay McShann & Jimmy Witherspoon, Koko Taylor
- 1992: Chuck Berry, James Brown, David Honeyboy Edwards, Ruth Brown, Mighty Clouds of Joy, Popa Chubby, Snooky Pryor with Johnny Nicholas, Hubert Sumlin, Irma Thomas & The Professionals, Joe Louis Walker
- 1993: Preston Shannon Band, King Biscuit Time with Robert Lockwood, Jr., Pinetop Perkins and host "Sunshine" Sonny Payne, Rufus Thomas, Tribute To Robert Johnson with John Hammond, Rory Block, Lonnie Pitchford and Kevin Moore (Keb' Mo'), James Cotton, John Lee Hooker, Five Blind Boys of Alabama, Charlie Musselwhite, Denise LaSalle, Little Milton, Tribute To Muddy Waters with Jimmy Rogers, Willie Smith, Calvin "Fuzz" Jones, Luther "Guitar Junior" Johnson, Carey Bell, Pinetop Perkins and Big Daddy Kinsey
- 1994: All-star Chess Records Tribute with Billy Boy Arnold, Bo Diddley, Lowell Fulson, Johnnie Johnson, Sam Lay, Dave Myers, Jimmy Rogers and Hubert Sumlin, Jr. Wells, Staple Singers, Buddy Guy, Robert Cray Band, Jeff Healey Band, Blues Pioneers (Homesick James, Jack Owens & Bud Spires, Jesse Thomas), Ladies Sing The Blues (Barbara Morrison, Diamond Teeth Mary, Big Time Sarah, Dj Gary "The Wagman" Wagner served as emcee
- 1995: Buddy Guy, Otis Rush, Dr. John, The Fabulous Thunderbirds, Charles Brown, Fat Possum Juke Joint Caravan with Paul "Wine" Jones, Junior Kimbrough and Dave Thompson, Booker T & The MGs, with the Memphis Horns featuring Eddie Floyd & Mavis Staples, Floyd Dixon, Johnny Otis Show featuring Linda Hopkins, Lowell Fulson & Big Jay McNeely, Jay McShann & Jimmy Witherspoon, Brownie McGhee, Rufus Thomas, DJ Gary "The Wagman" Wagner served as emcee
- 1996: Asleep at the Wheel, Marcia Ball, Lou Ann Barton, Bobby Bland, Clarence "Gatemouth" Brown, Charles Brown, Texas Johnny Brown, W. C. Clark, Johnny Copeland with Shemekia Copeland, Floyd Dixon, Anson Funderburgh & The Rockets featuring Sam Myers, Lowell Fulson, Roy Gaines, Cal & Clarence Green, Guitar Shorty, Carol Fran & Clarence Hollimon, Joe Hughes, Little Richard with Grady Gaines and the Upsetters, Long John Hunter, Smokin' Joe Kubek with Bnois King, Pete Mayes, Jimmy "T99" Nelson, Henry Qualls with Hash Brown, Sonny Rhodes, Angela Strehli, Texas Tornados, DJ Gary "The Wagman" Wagner served as emcee
- 1997: Buddy Guy, James Cotton, Son Seals, Otis Clay, John Lee Hooker, Koko Taylor, Otis Rush, Snooky Pryor, Soul Stirrers, Chuck Berry, Ike Turner's Rhythm & Blues Revue, Bo Diddley, Joe Louis Walker, Chess All-stars featuring Hubert Sumlin, Billy Boy Arnold, Jimmy Rogers, and Johnnie Johnson, DJ Gary "The Wagman" Wagner served as emcee
- 1998: Sing It! (Marcia Ball, Irma Thomas & Tracy Nelson), Lou Ann Barton, Blues Brothers Band featuring Eddie Floyd & Wilson Pickett, Lonnie Brooks, Roomful of Blues featuring Duke Robillard, Curtis Salgado & Ronnie Earl, Robben Ford, Dixie Hummingbirds, the Yardbirds, The Splinter Group feat. Peter Green, John Mayall's Bluesbreakers, British Blues Reunion featuring Mick Taylor, Kim Simmonds, Peter Green & Keith Emerson, James Harman, Taj Mahal, Jimmie Vaughan, DJ Gary "The Wagman" Wagner served as emcee
- 1999: Guitar Shorty with Sonny Rhodes, Koko Taylor And Her Blues Machine, The Fabulous Thunderbirds with Smokey Wilson, Clarence "Gatemouth" Brown, Buddy Guy, Clarence Carter, Johnny Rawls with Roy Gaines, Little Milton with Bobby Rush, Al Green, Bobby "Blue" Bland, Harpmasters Jam with Snooky Pryor, Carey Bell, Billy Boy Arnold and Sugar Blue, Joe Louis Walker with Jimmy Thackery and Billy Branch, Ruth Brown, Charlie Musselwhite, John Lee Hooker, DJ Gary "The Wagman" Wagner served as emcee
- 2000: Bo Diddley with Billy Boy Arnold, George Thorogood & The Destroyers, Son Seals with Sugar Blue, Lonestar Shootout: Lonnie Brooks, Long John Hunter, and Phillip Walker, Bernard Allison, Etta James, Bobby Womack, Charles Wright & The Watts 103rd Street Rhythm Band, Jimmy Dawkins, Carl Weathersby with Melvin Taylor, Mavis Staples with the Staple Singers Band, The Allman Brothers Band, Robert Cray Band, Harpmasters Jam II with Rod Piazza, James Cotton, Johnny Dyer, Charlie Musselwhite, Billy Branch, and the Mighty Flyers, DJ Gary "The Wagman" Wagner served as emcee
- 2001: James Harman, Koko Taylor, Guitar Shorty, Jimmie Vaughan, Lucky Peterson, Solomon Burke, Bobby "Blue" Bland, Percy Sledge, Howard Tate, Little Milton
- 2002: Arthur Adams, Otis Rush, Ben E. King, The Ohio Players, Jeff Healey, Robert Cray Band, Mable John, Roy Gaines, Tyrone Davis, Ike Turner & The Kings Of Rhythm, Dr. John, Etta James
- 2003: King Brothers, Pinetop Perkins, Bob Margolin, Carey Bell, Hubert Sumlin, Charlie Musselwhite, Keb' Mo', The Neville Brothers, Billy Preston, Irma Thomas & The Professionals, Joe Louis Walker, Joe Cocker, Al Green
- 2004: Macy Gray, Jimmie Vaughan with Lou Ann Barton, Jimmy Dawkins with Billy Boy Arnold, Rod Piazza with James Cotton, Buddy Guy, Leon Russell, Little Milton with Dave Alvin, Solomon Burke, Clarence Carter
- 2005: Etta James, Los Lobos, Howard Tate, Bobby Rush, Cafe R&B, The Black Crowes, Bobby Bland, Guitar Shorty, Johnny Rawls, Otis Clay.
- 2006: War, Joe Cocker, Rickie Lee Jones, Jerry "The Iceman" Butler, Luther "Guitar Junior" Johnson, Bettye LaVette, Lucky Peterson, The Mannish Boys, Kenny Neal, Billy Branch, Carl Weathersby, The Campbell Brothers
- 2007: Buddy Guy, Dr. John, Taj Mahal & The Phantom Blues Band, Koko Taylor & Her Blues Machine, Jackie Payne/Steve Edmonson Band, The Delgado Brothers, Little Richard, Jimmy Reed Highway, Robert Cray Band, Irma Thomas & The Professionals, The Honeydripper Allstars, and Harry Manx & Kevin Breit
- 2008: Chuck Berry, John Mayall, Pinetop Perkins, The Dirty Dozen Brass Band, Roy Rogers and the Delta Rhythm Kings, Roy Young, Taj Mahal Trio, Booker T. Jones, Charlie Musselwhite, Eddie Floyd, Joe Louis Walker and Ana Popović
- 2009: Kenny Wayne Shepherd, Funky Meters, Johnny Winter, Bettye LaVette, Homemade Jamz Blues Band, Hill Country Revue, Bobby Womack, Mavis Staples, The Blind Boys of Alabama, Sonny Landreth, Diunna Greenleaf, Andy Walo Trio
- 2010: Keb' Mo', John Cleary, Guitar Shorty, Arthur Adams

== See also ==
- List of blues festivals
- List of folk festivals
