= Soul Sensation! =

Studio album by Carol Fran and Clarence Hollimon
- Released: 1992
- Genre: Blues
- Label: Black Top
- Producer: Hammond Scott

Carol Fran and Clarence Hollimon chronology
Soul Sensation! (1992)	See There! (1994)

Soul Sensation! is the debut album by the American musical duo Carol Fran and Clarence Hollimon, released in 1992. Their friend Grady Gaines helped them sign a contract with Black Top Records. The duo supported the album with a North American tour.

== Production ==
The album was produced by Hammond Scott. George Porter Jr. played bass on the majority of the tracks. "I'll Make Your Life Sunshine" and "Mother's Love" were written by Earl King. "I Had a Talk with My Man" is a cover of the Mitty Collier song. Hollimon sings on "Box with the Hole in the Middle"; his "Gristle" is an instrumental. "This Little Light" and "Bring It On Home to Me / Old Folks Jam" are duets with James "Thunderbird" Davis, the last recordings the musician made before his 1992 death.

== Critical reception ==
Professional ratings
Review scores
Source	Rating
All Music Guide to Soul	4/5 stars
Chicago Tribune	3/4 stars
DownBeat	3.5/5 stars
The Grove Press Guide to the Blues on CD	3/5 stars
MusicHound Blues: The Essential Album Guide	4/5 stars
The Press of Atlantic City	3/4 stars

The Chicago Tribune said that the duo "strut their stuff on this rollicking collection that encompasses sizzling blues and classy lounge fare." The Press of Atlantic City stated that "this is three o'clock in the morning stuff". The Asbury Park Press opined that the album "explores blues, jazz, R&B and zydeco without finding a home in any of them." The Boston Globe praised "Hollimon's fine guitar work and Fran's powerhouse singing." The Staten Island Advance called Soul Sensation! "one of the most entertaining and satisfying blues releases of the year."

== Track listing ==
No.	Title	Length
1.	"Golden Girl"
2.	"Push – Pull"
3.	"I'll Make Your Life Sunshine"
4.	"Blues for Carol"
5.	"Box with the Hole in the Middle"
6.	"My Happiness"
7.	"I Needs to Be Be'd With"
8.	"Anytime, Anyplace, Anywhere"
9.	"Forgive Me, but My Heart Is Broken"
10.	"Bring It On Home to Me / Old Folks Jam"
11.	"I Had a Talk with My Man"
12.	"Gristle"
13.	"Mother's Love"
14.	"Tin-Tin-dé-O"
15.	"This Little Light"
