= Get Wise to Yourself =

Studio album by Guitar Shorty
- Released: 1995
- Recorded: August – September 1995
- Genre: Blues; Blues rock
- Length: 54:29
- Label: Black Top
- Producer: Hammond Scott; Nauman S. Scott

Guitar Shorty chronology
| Topsy Turvy (1993) | Get Wise to Yourself (1995) | Billie Jean Blues (1996) |

Get Wise to Yourself is the third studio album released by blues guitarist Guitar Shorty. The album was recorded during August and September 1995 and released later that year on CD by the label Black Top. The tracks "I'm the Clean up Man" and "Hard to Stay Above the Ground" appeared on Shorty's compilation album, The Best of Guitar Shorty, in 2006.

== Track listing ==
1. "I'm the Clean up Man" (Kearney, Scott) — 3:46
2. "You Better Get Wise to Yourself" (Jones, Swamp Dogg) — 5:32
3. "I Don't Know Why" (Mitchell, Randle) — 5:29
4. "You Don't Treat Me Right" (Kearney) — 2:45
5. "My Baby Loves to Do the Bump" (Kearney) — 4:25
6. "Hard to Stay Above the Ground" (Kearney, Scott) — 5:41
7. "You Left Me Dreaming" (Kazanoff, Kearney, Scott, Zeno) — 4:26
8. "She's Built, She's Built to Kill" (Swamp Dogg) — 3:42
9. "A Fool Who Wants to Stay" (Kazanoff) — 4:10
10. "The Blues Done Got Me" (Kearney) — 5:33
11. "Ways of Man" (Reynolds, Tate) — 3:34
12. "Smells Good" (Kearney) — 6:43

== Personnel ==
- Sammy Berfect — organ (hammond)
- Ernest Youngblood, Jr. — saxophone (tenor)
- Guitar Shorty — guitar, vocals
- Mark "Kaz" Kazanoff — saxophone (baritone, tenor), associate producer
- Raymond Weber — percussion, drums
- Riley Osborne — piano
- Charles Elam III, Phillip Manuel — vocals (background)
- Steve Howard — trumpet, flugelhorn
- Mark Mullins — trombone
- Ward Smith — saxophone (alto, baritone, tenor)
- Lee Allen Zeno — bass, associate producer

Production:

- Matt Coby, Jay Gallagher — assistant engineers
- David Farrell, Steve Reynolds — engineers, editing, mixing, sequencing
- Patricia Gorman, Lisa Labo — production assistants
- Rick Olivier — photography
- Hammond Scott — producer, editing, mixing, sequencing
- Nauman S. Scott — executive producer
- Diane Wanek — design
- Heather West — production coordination

== Reception ==
Professional ratings
Review scores
| Source | Rating |
|---|---|
| Allmusic | 3/5 stars |

While the most of AllMusic review of the album makes more mention of Shorty's live show, it does praise the album, saying that it "is one of his best recorded efforts ... that shows his abilities off in the best light."
