= The Best of Guitar Shorty =

Compilation album by Guitar Shorty
- Released: June 20, 2006
- Genre: Blues, blues rock
- Label: Shout! Factory
- Producer: Derek Dressler; Jeff Palo

Guitar Shorty chronology
Watch Your Back (2004)	The Best of Guitar Shorty (2006)	We the People (2006)

The Best of Guitar Shorty is the first true compilation album released by blues guitarist Guitar Shorty; 1996's Billie Jean Blues was more of a live album. The album was released on June 20, 2006 on CD by the label Shout! Factory. The album comprises tracks from My Way or the Highway (1991), Topsy Turvy (1993), Get Wise to Yourself (1995), and Roll Over, Baby (1998).

== Track listing ==
1. "Go Wild!" (Jackson, Rhodes, Wolf) — 3:05
2. "You Better Get Wise to Yourself" (Jones, Swamp Dogg) — 5:35
3. "I Want to Report a Crime" (Williams) — 4:08
4. "Hard to Stay Above the Ground" (Kearney, Scott) — 5:43
5. "Hard Life" (Kearney) — 5:19
6. "I'm So Glad I Met You" (Fran, Kearney) — 4:17
7. "Maybe She'll Miss Me" (Barnhill, Rice) — 4:30
8. "I'm the Clean Up Man" — 3:46
9. "The Bottom Line" — 3:53
10. "No Educated Woman" — 6:05
11. "I Wonder Who's Sleeping in My Bed" — 7:06
12. "Red Hot Mama" — 3:25
13. "Mean Husband Blues" — 3:56
14. "Hey Joe" (Roberts) — 7:07

== Personnel ==
- Guitar Shorty — guitar, vocals
- Howard Deere, Glenn Letsch, Dan Quinton, Lee Allen Zeno — bass
- Otis Grand, Chris Hayes, Clarence Hollimon — guitar
- Herman V. Ernest III, Shannon Powell, Danny Pucillo Quartet, Daniel Strittmatter — drums, percussion
- Riley Osborne — piano
- Tony Ashton, Sammy Berfect, Jim Pugh, Dwayne Smith, David Torkanowsky — organ
- Peter Beck, Ward Smith, Ernest Youngblood Jr. — saxophone (alto, tenor)
- Carol Fran, Charles Elam III, Phillip Manuel — vocals
- Mike Hobart, Mark "Kaz" Kazanoff — saxophone (baritone)
- Michael Mordecai, Mark Mullins, Rick Trolsen — trombones
- Jamil Sharif, Gary Slechta, Keith Winking — trumpets

Production:

- Bill Dahl — liner notes
- Derek Dressler — compilation producer
- James Fraher — cover photo
- Emily Johnson — artwork, package supervision
- Jeff Palo — producer
- Randy Perry — remastering
- Julee Stover — editorial supervision

== Reception ==
Professional ratings
Review scores
Source	Rating
Allmusic	3.5/5 stars

AllMusic stated that "Guitar Shorty on disc is a poor substitute, but he still generates tremendous energy." Reviewer Steve Leggett comments that "Shorty is a guitar player's guitar player, and this collection makes for a nice introduction to his studio style."
