= Dresses Too Short =

Studio album by Bobby Radcliff
- Released: 1989
- Genre: Blues
- Label: Black Top
- Producer: Hammond Scott

Bobby Radcliff chronology
Early in the Morning (1985)	Dresses Too Short (1989)	Universal Blues (1991)

Dresses Too Short is the second album by the American musician Bobby Radcliff, released in 1989. He supported it with a North American tour.

== Production ==
The album was produced by Hammond Scott. Radcliff was influenced primarily by Elvis Presley and Magic Sam, who was a mentor to him in the 1960s. Ronnie Earl played guitar on some of the tracks. Mark "Kaz" Kazanoff and Ron Levy contributed on saxophone and piano, respectively. "Going Home Tomorrow" is a cover of the Fats Domino song. "Keep Loving Me Baby" is a version of the Otis Rush song.

== Critical reception ==
Professional ratings
Review scores
Source	Rating
All Music Guide to the Blues	5/5 stars
DownBeat	5/5 stars
The Encyclopedia of Popular Music	3/5 stars
The Grove Press Guide to the Blues on CD	4/5 stars
MusicHound Blues: The Essential Album Guide	4/5 stars
The Rolling Stone Jazz & Blues Album Guide	2.5/5 stars

The St. Petersburg Times said that Radcliff's "colorful tenor packs a soulful wallop, while his electric guitar solos snarl and squeal with a robust intensity that rarely sacrifices flash for substance." The Washington Post called him "one of the most volatile and distinctive blues guitarists working today." The Chicago Tribune noted that he has "a penchant for clusters of rapid-fire notes that give his playing a kind of jittery, pentup-emotion-unleashed quality."

The Press of Atlantic City labeled Ratcliff "without a doubt ... this year's most original sounding guitar soloist." The Boston Globe admired the "slyly inventive and unorthodox playing style". The Rolling Stone Jazz & Blues Album Guide deemed the album his "flashiest but least satisfying release".

== Track listing ==
No.	Title	Length
1.	"Ugh!"
2.	"Bonehead"
3.	"Stick Around"
4.	"You Haven't Hurt Me"
5.	"Going Home Tomorrow"
6.	"Next Woman I Marry"
7.	"Dresses Too Short"
8.	"Keep Loving Me Baby"
9.	"Alimony Blues"
10.	"Hard Road to Travel"
11.	"Kool and the Gang"
