= Lover's Plea =

Studio album by W. C. Clark
- Released: 1998
- Recorded: December 1997
- Studio: Pedernales
- Genre: Blues
- Label: Black Top
- Producer: Hammond Scott, Mark "Kaz" Kazanoff

W. C. Clark chronology
Texas Soul (1995)	Lover's Plea (1998)	From Austin with Soul (2002)

Lover's Plea is an album by the American musician W. C. Clark, released in 1998. It was his third album for Black Top Records. Clark supported the album with a North American tour. The album was nominated for a W. C. Handy Award for "Soul Blues Album" of the year.

== Production ==
The album was coproduced by Mark "Kaz" Kazanoff. Clark was backed by Double Trouble on several tracks; the Kamikaze Horns appeared on a few. "Are You Here, Are You There?" is about Clark's late fiancée, who died in an accident when Clark lost control of his tour van; his drummer was also killed. "Pretty Little Mama" is dedicated to Clark's daughter. "I'm Hooked on You" is a cover of the Al Green song. "Sunshine Lady" employed a gospel choir.

== Critical reception ==
Professional ratings
Review scores
Source	Rating
AllMusic	4/5 stars
Los Angeles Times	A
Pittsburgh Post-Gazette	3.5/4 stars
The Tampa Tribune	3/4 stars

The Pittsburgh Post-Gazette wrote that "sensuous falsettos and gritty stylings melt into a rich, soulful voice with hints of Al Green and O.V. Wright... It's just the right blend of elegance and grit for this album, a rumination about the joys and sorrows of love." The Advocate noted that "soul meets the blues in the Austin, Texas-bred, horns-blessed sound." The Chicago Tribune called the album "a perfect 7-10 split of tough, shuffling Lone Star blues and punchy Stax-style soul driven home with taut, tart fretwork and molasses rich vocals."

The Age concluded that, "like Albert King, Clark is a gifted crooner and, like Syl Johnson, he can inject his material with the strongest whiskey-toned voice around." The Daily Herald said: "A bright but sly guitar player himself, Clark laces his playing smoothly through his songs so the feeling isn't tromped, merely accented with a punch." The Los Angeles Times determined that "Clark's voice mesmerizes on songs about girls that made him happy and those that did not—the blues in a nutshell."

AllMusic wrote that "Clark's vocals here are nothing short of eloquent while his guitar stings and stabs with the best of them."

== Track listing ==
No.	Title	Length
1.	"Changing My Life with Your Love"
2.	"Lover's Plea"
3.	"Lonely No More"
4.	"Someday"
5.	"Pretty Little Mama"
6.	"Are You Here, Are You There?"
7.	"Everywhere I Go"
8.	"Sunshine Lady"
9.	"I'm Hooked on You"
10.	"Why I Got the Blues"
11.	"Do You Mean It?"
12.	"That's a Good Idea"
