= Working Girl Blues =

Studio album by Phillip Walker
- Released: 1995
- Genre: Blues
- Label: Black Top
- Producer: Hammond Scott

Phillip Walker chronology
| Big Blues from Texas (1992) | Working Girl Blues (1995) | I Got a Sweet Tooth (1998) |

Working Girl Blues is an album by the American musician Phillip Walker, released in 1995. It was his first album for an American label in seven years. Walker supported the album with a North American tour. Working Girl Blues was a hit on blues radio formats.

== Production ==
Produced by Hammond Scott, the album was recorded with two different bands, in New Orleans and in Los Angeles. It combined regional musical influences from Louisiana, California, and Texas. Walker employed a horn section on some songs.

The title track was written by Jimmy Johnson in the 1960s. "The Hustle Is On" is a cover of the T-Bone Walker song. "Hello, My Darling" is a remake of Walker's 1959 debut single.

== Critical reception ==
Professional ratings
Review scores
| Source | Rating |
|---|---|
| AllMusic | 4/5 stars |
| Chicago Tribune | 3/4 stars |
| The Encyclopedia of Popular Music | 3/5 stars |
| MusicHound Blues: The Essential Album Guide | 4/5 stars |

The Edmonton Journal praised the "beautifully crafted" songs that twist "through R&B, swing, blues and country blues, with a zydeco number thrown in for good measure." The New York Times deemed the album "excellent," and noted that Walker "is part of the Texas and Louisiana school of blues."

Guitar Player determined that Walker's "quick bends and slow, plaintive releases tread the elusive middle ground between big Texas blues and West Coast cool." The Los Angeles Times stated that Working Girl Blues "reaffirms his place as a first-rate bluesman in styles ranging from shuffles and stomps to zydeco and ballads."

AllMusic wrote that "Walker remains in fine form on this recent set, a mix of remakes of past triumphs ... and fresh explorations."

== Track listing ==
| No. | Title | Length |
|---|---|---|
| 1. | "Special Built Woman" |
| 2. | "Hey, Hey Baby's Gone" |
| 3. | "Working Girl Blues" |
| 4. | "Bad Luck" |
| 5. | "Brother, Go Ahead and Take Her" |
| 6. | "Thanks a Lot (For the Offer)" |
| 7. | "Beatrice, Beatrice" |
| 8. | "The Hustle Is On" |
| 9. | "Hurry Back Home" |
| 10. | "A Thing Called the Blues" |
| 11. | "I Got a Problem" |
| 12. | "How Long Must I Wait?" |
| 13. | "Hello, My Darling" |
| 14. | "My Baby's Gonna Wash Me Down" |
