= The Andy T Band =

American blues band

The Andy T Band (formerly The Andy T – Nick Nixon Band) is an American blues band from Nashville, Tennessee, United States, led by Andy "T" Talamantez, originally with James "Nick" Nixon. The group formed in 2011 and is signed to the San Francisco-based Blind Pig Records. In 2017, the band renamed itself The Andy T Band, after their lead singer, Nick Nixon, left due to health issues; he died in 2018. "Alabama Mike" Benjamin has since taken the lead singer spot.

== Members ==
=== Andy T ===
Guitarist Andy "T" Talamantez, a Southern California native, was first influenced by the sounds of English rock and blues musician Eric Clapton during his teenage years. Falling in love with the blues, Andy listened and learned from the styles and works of musicians like Peter Green and B.B. King, among others. He performed in various bands in and around Los Angeles until 1996, when he was picked up by Smokey Wilson to perform with him on his first tour. In 1998, Andy also began playing alongside Texan blues musician Guitar Shorty. During Andy's seven years on the road with Smokey and Shorty, he not only developed his own distinct playing style, but also learned how to get a crowd on their feet. He remembers that "the biggest lesson I learned from Smokey and Shorty was the importance of putting on a good show, because they were great showmen". Smokey Wilson and the Andy T Band album released Ready to Roll in 2003. Andy relocated to Nashville, Tennessee in 2008.

=== Nick Nixon ===
James "Nick" Nixon was a Nashville native who sang throughout his childhood, in church, high school performances, and opera. He remembered: "I had to actually learn how to sing 'wrong' after that, when I decided I wanted to sing rock and blues". An active participant in the Jefferson Street blues scene of the 1960s and 1970s, Nixon befriended and performed with Jimi Hendrix. Nixon and his band, Past, Present and Future, were signed to Chess Records in 1974. In the 1960s, he also sang lead vocals in an racially integrated band, the R&B group King James and the Sceptres, as well as with the New Imperials, but his longest gig was teaching music for Nashville's Parks and Recreation Department, which he did for 35 years before teaming up with Andy T.

Nixon died in 2018, aged 76.

== History ==
Andy T and Nixon met at the Nashville Blues Society's regular Sunday night jam, where Andy was leading the house band. The two performers were immediately impressed and struck by their stagemate's talent, with Andy saying of the vocalist, "The first time Nick sang next to me on stage I got goose bumps. Nick sings like I'd like to able to sing". Nixon has appreciation of Andy to match, saying of the team's first record, Drink Drank Drunk, released in 2013, "I just had a feeling it was going to do real good". Andy T and the Nick Nixon Band then stuck to "getting to the bottom of what the blues is all about." The band collaborated with several musicians on their sophomore album, Livin' It Up, which featured Ron Jones on saxophone, as well as Larry Van Loon on the piano.

== Discography ==
- Drink Drank Drunk, 2013
- Livin' It Up, 2014
- Numbers Man, 2015
- Double Strike, 2017
