= Gary Wagner =

Gary Wagner may refer to:

- Gary Wagner, member of Dance or Die
- Gary Wagner (baseball) (1940–2026), American Major League Baseball pitcher
- Gary Wagner (DJ) (born 1950), American disc jockey and radio personality
