= Roll Over, Baby =

Studio album by Guitar Shorty
- Released: August 11, 1998
- Recorded: April – May 1998
- Genre: Blues; Blues rock
- Length: 55:42
- Label: Black Top
- Producer: Hammond Scott; Nauman S. Scott

Guitar Shorty chronology
Blues Is All Right (1996)	Roll Over, Baby (1998)	I Go Wild! (2001)

Roll Over, Baby is the fifth studio album released by blues guitarist, Guitar Shorty. The album was recorded in April and May 1998 and released later that year in August on CD by Black Top.

== Track listing ==
1. "I Want to Report a Crime" (Williams) — 4:06
2. "Roll over, Baby" (Williams) — 4:48
3. "Sugar Wugar" (Kearney, Scott) — 4:46
4. "You're a Troublemaker" (Kearney, Scott) — 5:21
5. "Don't Mess With My Woman" (Kearney) — 4:36
6. "Me and You Last Night" (Williams) — 3:20
7. "Let's Get Close" (Kearney) — 3:10
8. "I Wonder Who's Sleeping in My Bed" (Kearney) — 7:04
9. "The Porkchop Song" (Williams) — 2:46
10. "I'm Going Back to Houston" (Kearney) — 4:16
11. "Hard Time Woman" (Alexander, Kearney) — 4:14
12. "Hey Joe" (Roberts) — 7:15

== Personnel ==
- David Torkanowsky — piano, organ (hammond)
- Ernest Youngblood, Jr. — saxophone (tenor)
- Guitar Shorty — guitar, vocals
- Mark "Kaz" Kazanoff — saxophone (baritone, tenor)
- Kenneth Blevins, Shannon Powell, Danny Pucillo Quartet — percussion, drums
- Jamil Sharif, Gary Slechta — trumpets
- Rick Trolsen — trombone
- Lee Allen Zeno — bass, associate producer

Production:

- David Farrell, Steve Reynolds — engineers, editing, mixing, sequencing
- Blake Thompson — production assistant
- Rick Olivier — photography
- Hammond Scott — producer, editing, mixing, sequencing
- Nauman S. Scott — executive producer
- Diane Wanek — design
- Heather West — production coordination

== Reception ==
Professional ratings
Review scores
Source	Rating
AllMusic	4.5/5 stars

AllMusic says that "Guitar Shorty keeps it lean, mean and direct on this outing" and that the album "showcases the guitarist's wide-ranging chops and skills."
