= The Man from M.A.R.S. =

The Man from M.A.R.S. may mean:

- The Man from M.A.R.S. (1922 film), a silent science fiction film
- "The Man from M.A.R.S." (cartoon), a Taz-Mania cartoon
- The Man from Mars, a 1946 Polish film
- The Man from Mars (album), an album by Smokey Wilson

== See also ==
- Martian
