= I Go Wild! =

Studio album by Guitar Shorty
- Released: October 23, 2001
- Recorded: April 2001
- Genre: Blues; Blues rock
- Label: Evidence
- Producer: Brian Brinkerhoff; Scott Mathews

Guitar Shorty chronology
Roll Over, Baby (1998)	I Go Wild! (2001)	Watch Your Back (2004)

I Go Wild! is the sixth studio album released by blues guitarist Guitar Shorty. The album was recorded in April 2001 and released later that year on October 23 on CD by the label Evidence. The album contains mainly covers of other blues songs.

The tracks "Maybe She'll Miss Me" and "Go Wild!" would later appear on Shorty's compilation album, The Best of Guitar Shorty, in 2006.

== Track listing ==
1. "Loosen Up" (Isaac Hayes, David Porter) — 3:39
2. "Coffee and Cigarettes" (Hewitt, Truitt) — 4:36
3. "Maybe She'll Miss Me" (Barnhill, Rice) — 4:28
4. "If You Can't Lie No Better" (Delbert McClinton, Nicholson) — 3:48
5. "Just Warming Up" (Matthews, Pugh) — 4:45
6. "Go Wild!" (Johnson, Rhodes, Wolf) — 3:05
7. "Don't Stop (I Just Started)" (Fraser, Miller) — 3:43
8. "One and Only Man" (Jim Capaldi, Steve Winwood) — 4:47
9. "Life With You" (Rice) — 4:01
10. "Lesson in Love" (Cain, Neall, Vallance, Varnes) — 5:08
11. "Put It All in There" (Dixon) — 5:00
12. "In the Morning" (Mathews, Pugh) — 4:13
13. "The Netherlands" (Kearney) — 6:13

== Personnel ==
- Guitar Shorty — guitar, vocals
- Howard Deere, Glenn Letsch — bass
- Terry "Big T" de Rouen — guitar
- Scott Mathews — drums, guitar (rhythm), keyboards, saxophone, producer
- Jim Pugh — organ (hammond)

Production:

- Robert Barclay, Markus Cuff — photography
- Brian Brinkerhoff — producer
- Tom Carr — mastering
- Holly Harris — liner notes

== Reception ==
Professional ratings
Review scores
Source	Rating
Allmusic	3/5 stars
The Penguin Guide to Blues Recordings	2.5/4 stars

Allmusic says that the songs "provide matching passion and rambunctiousness" and that "one of the strong points ... is Shorty's ability to translate the exhilaration and acrobatics (literally) of his live show into the studio." The Penguin Guide to Blues Recordings says that the length of the tracks is more restricted on this album than in the past, but this "has the adverse effect of making him play at full throttle almost all the time."
