= Bobby Radcliff =

American singer

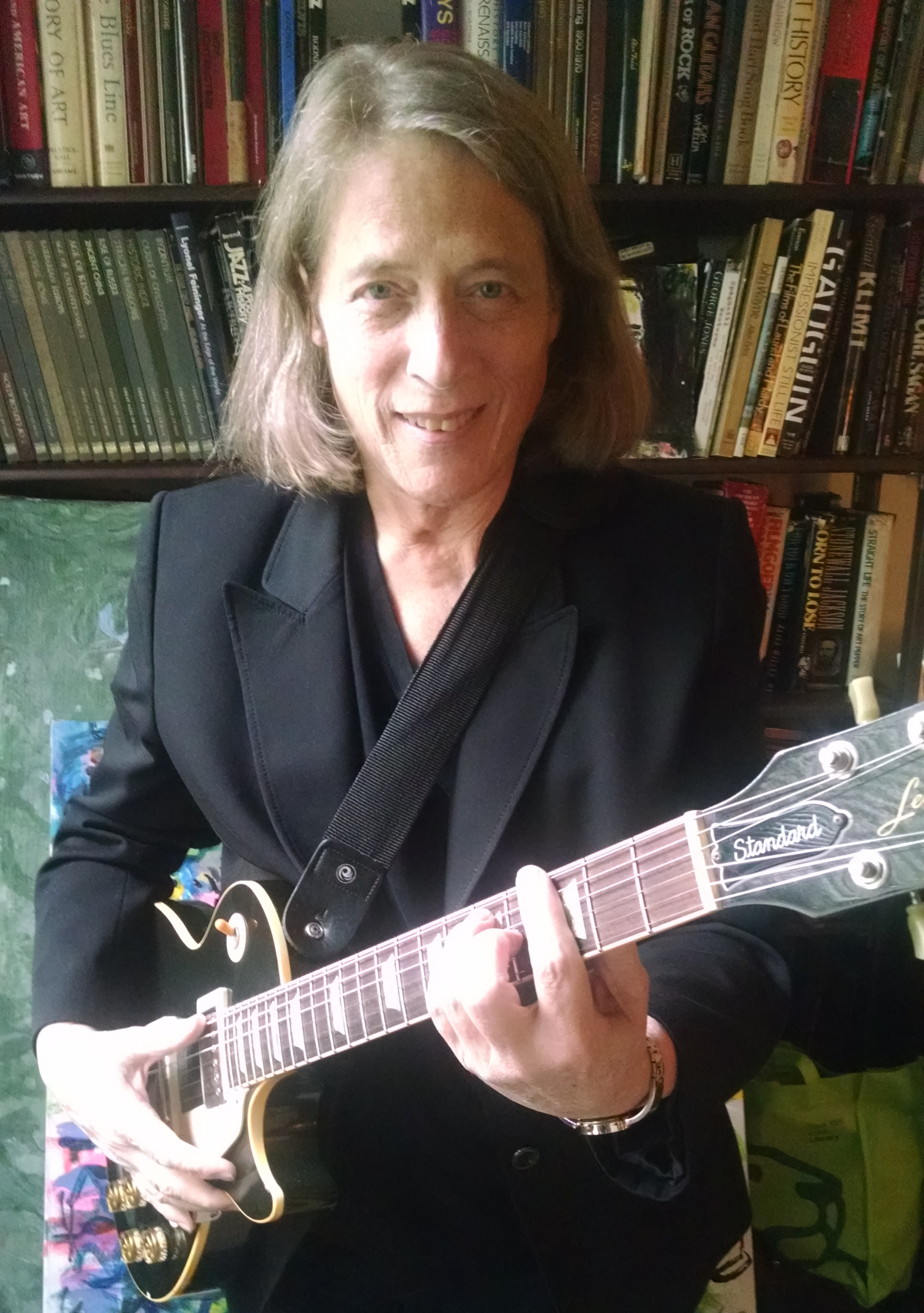
- Bobby Radcliff, June 2016

Background information
- Born: Robert Radcliff Ewan; September 22, 1951 (age 75); Washington, D.C., United States
- Genres: Blues, rhythm and blues, jazz
- Occupation: Musician
- Instruments: Guitar, vocals
- Years active: 1964–present
- Labels: A-Okay, Black Top, Rollo, Krellno
- Website: www.bobbyradcliffblues.com

Bobby Radcliff (born Robert Radcliff Ewan, September 22, 1951) is an American blues guitarist, singer and songwriter. Radcliff was raised in Bethesda, Maryland and started playing guitar in his early teens.

He is known for his work in "The Yarbs", under bandleader Chris Pestalozzi. The band played cover songs, standards, and originals, crossing many genres, with an emphasis on original compositions and blues. In 1968, Radcliff also joined "The Northside Blues Band", alongside Brett Littlehales (harmonica), Guy Dorsey (keyboard), William Bowman (bass), and Van Holmead (drums).

== Musical inspirations ==
Radcliff's inspirations include Butterfield Blues Band (Paul Butterfield, Mike Bloomfield, and Elvin Bishop), but also draws from country guitarist James Burton (from Ricky Nelson's band), Kenneth "Thumbs" Carllile (from Jimmy Dickens band), Don Rich (from Buck Owen's Band), Steve Cropper, Slim Harpo, Howlin' Wolf, Muddy Waters, The Ventures, and many others. He was also influenced by the Rolling Stones, Eric Clapton, and many other British Blues Bands. Radcliff met many blues musicians during this period, such as Freddy King and Buddy Guy (1968).

== Early career and influences ==
Radcliff was born in Washington, D.C., United States. A seminal moment in Radcliff's musical development came when he attended the Ann Arbor Blues Festival in 1969. It was there he saw Magic Sam for the first time. This performance inspired Radcliff to form his band – a trio he modeled after Sam's band. Radcliff was so inspired by Magic Sam that he soon boarded a bus to Chicago, venturing to meet his newfound guitar idol. Radcliff arrived in Chicago only to learn Magic Sam had suffered a major heart attack and was in Cook County Hospital. Radcliff sat by his bedside until Sam woke up. He explained that he had seen him at the Ann Arbor Festival and Sam was receptive to young Radcliff's pilgrimage to meet him.

After Sam recovered, he invited Radcliff back to his home at 1513 South Harding Street, in the heart of Chicago's West Side. Sam introduced Radcliff to the West Side Chicago blues scene at such venues as The Alex Club (1815 Roosevelt Road) and the L & A Lounge on Pulaski (where Sam was a part-time bartender when he couldn't get enough work as a musician). They also went to The Key Largo where Otis Rush often performed and The Flash Lounge where Sam introduced Radcliff to Eddy Clearwater.

Some of the other musicians that Sam introduced Radcliff to in Chicago include: Mighty Joe Young (guitar), Ernie Gatewood (who also sometimes played bass for Magic Sam), Otis Rush, Jimmy Dawkins, Mac Thompson (bass), Letha Jones (widow of pianist Johnny Jones), and many other musicians. Radcliff often witnessed Sam performing with the above-mentioned musicians and many others.

Over the next six months, Radcliff visited Sam several times, staying with Sam's family in Chicago. Sam died in December 1969 at the age of 32 from a heart attack. Radcliff and Dick Waterman attended Sam's funeral together.

By this time, Radcliff's style was infused with Magic Sam's unique sound. Writer Dave Hussong Vintage Guitar Magazine (1990) touches on Radcliff's expansive musical range as a vocalist, instrumentalist, and live performer:

"Unencumbered by style restrictions, Radcliff brings a sense of intensity and conviction, both instrumentally and vocally (the latter being an area where many 90's interpreters fall face down) that puts his, and this, live performance into a very special league of its own."

== Move to New York ==
In 1977, he relocated to New York, where he took a day job in a bookstore. He performed most evenings and was one of the house musicians at the Lone Star Cafe and at Tramps, working with Kinky Friedman, Bernard Purdie, Otis Rush, Lowell Fulson, and Big Jay Mc Neeley, amongst many others. Radcliff's own band played at many clubs, including CBGBs. Radcliff's band was one of the few Blues bands playing there, as his songwriting and style continued to flourish.

During this time, there were many chance meetings at his shows, including when John Belushi saw Radcliff play at the Lone Star Café with Kinky Friedman in the late 1970s. John then recruited Radcliff for guitar lessons. During this time, he regularly saw Belushi. Subsequently, Belushi invited Radcliff to perform in the very first Blues Brothers show, featuring Belushi and Roomful of Blues.

In 1984, he recorded Early in the Morning, his first 33 RPM album, and by 1987 he began recording and performing full-time. Between 1989– and 1998, Radcliff released five albums on the Black Top Record label: Dresses Too Short, Universal Blues, There's a Cold Grave in Your Way, Live at The Rynborn and Live at Tipitina's. He toured extensively all over the world, performing at many premiere American and European festivals including the Berlin Jazz Festival, The Peer Festival in Belgium, The Byron Bay Blues Festival in Australia, the Warrnambool Festival in Australia, the Harvest Blues Festival in Ireland, the Lugano Blues Festival in Switzerland, the Lucerne Blues Festival in Switzerland, the Malmitalo Festival in Finland, The Aguas Blues Festival in Aguascalientes Mexico, the Granada Jazz and Blues Festival in Spain, the San Remo Blues Festival in Italy, and the Café Volga Festival in Japan. Radcliff performed at many other festivals, including tours with Earl King, where Radcliff played under his own name and also as Earl's backing band.

In addition to the above-mentioned festivals, Radcliff toured Europe and the United States extensively with the "Blacktop Artists Tours" that included Robert Ward, Snooks Eaglin, Ronnie Earl, Anson Funderburgh, Clarence Holliman, and James "Thunderbird" Davis. In 1990, Radcliff received a New York Music Award from a K-Rock radio station for "Best Blues Artist". That year, he also received a five-star review from the October issue of DownBeat for Dresses Too Short.

Guitar Player 's April 1990 issue did an extensive interview of Radcliff, praising his style, and Dresses Too Short on many levels.

In the early 1990s, Radcliff underwent hand surgery, which put his career on hold for quite a few years. After making a full recovery, Radcliff returned with the release of Natural Ball in 2005 via CD Baby/Rollo Records.

== Discography ==
- Early in the Morning (A-Okay, 1985)
- Dresses Too Short (Black Top, 1989)
- Universal Blues (Black Top, 1991)
- There's a Cold Grave in Your Way (Black Top 1994)
- Live at the Rynborn (Black Top 1997)
- Natural Ball (Rollo Records, 2004)
- Freaking Me Out (Krellno Records 2011)
- Absolute Hell (Krellno Records 2016)
