= Otis Grand =

American blues musician (1950–2023)

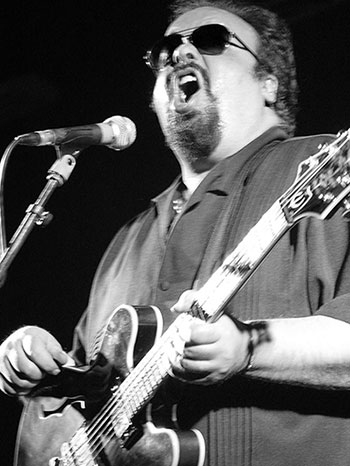
- Grand at Djurs Blues Festival, Denmark

Background information
- Born: Fred Bishti; February 14, 1950; Beirut, Lebanon
- Died: June 2023 (aged 73)
- Genres: Blues
- Occupation(s): Guitarist, singer, songwriter
- Instrument(s): Guitar, vocals
- Years active: Early 1980s–2023
- Labels: Sequel, various
- Website: Official website

Fred Bishti (February 14, 1950 – June 2023), known professionally as Otis Grand, was a Lebanese-born American blues musician, best known for his album, Perfume & Grime (1996) and his exciting live performances. He was honoured with the Presidential Medal for Arts by the Republic of Lebanon in 2009.

== Biography ==
Grand was born in Beirut, Lebanon. Otis Grand spent much of his life in the United States. He played with local blues musicians at Eli's Mile High Club in Oakland, California, and made contacts that would later prove useful; such as Joe Louis Walker who produced his debut album, Always Hot (1988). He later cited his early influences as being B.B. King, Otis Rush, Johnny Otis and T-Bone Walker. By the late 1980s, Grand was based in the UK where he and his Dance Kings became a popular nightclub act. He was voted 'Best UK Blues Guitarist' seven years running (1990–1996) by the British Blues Connection magazine. In 1991, Grand co-starred with his backing band and Guitar Shorty, on the My Way or the Highway album.

Joe Louis Walker also played on Grand's next album, He Knows the Blues (1992) alongside Calvin Owens, Alfred "Pee Wee" Ellis, and the singer Jimmy Nelson. The album was nominated for a W.C. Handy Award. Nothing Else Matters (1994) involved Curtis Salgado, Sugar Ray Norcia, and Kim Wilson, whilst Walker and Salgado returned for Perfume & Grime (1996) which also utilised Luther Allison and Darrell Nulisch.

In 1997, Grand guested on Joe Louis Walker's album, Great Guitars. In March 2009, Grand appeared on stage at the Arts Centre in Cranleigh, Surrey, England.

In addition to living in Lebanon and the United States, Grand lived in France and resided for much of his later life in Croydon, England.

His death was announced on June 9, 2023, via British live music promoter Pete Feenstra's Twitter account.

== Discography ==
- 1988: Always Hot (Indigo; Sanctuary)
- 1991: My Way or the Highway (JSP) with Guitar Shorty
- 1992: He Knows the Blues (Sequel; Volt)
- 1993: Big Blues From Texas (JSP) with Phillip Walker
- 1994: The Return of Honk! (JSP) with Joe Houston
- 1994: Nothing Else Matters (Sequel; Sanctuary)
- 1996: Perfume & Grime (Sequel; Sanctuary) with Darrell Nulisch and Curtis Salgado
- 1998: Grand Union (Blueside; Valley Entertainment) with Anson Funderburgh and Debbie Davies
- 2002: Guitar Brothers (JSP) with Joe Louis Walker
- 2007: Hipster Blues (Bliss Street)
- 2012: Blues '65 (Main Gate) with Sugar Ray & The Bluetones
- 2023: Live At Burnley Blues Festival / Collaborations & Rarities (JSP) 2-CD
