= Watch Your Back =

Studio album by Guitar Shorty
- Released: April 27, 2004
- Genre: Blues, blues rock
- Label: Alligator
- Producer: Brian Brinkerhoff; Jesse Harms

Guitar Shorty chronology
I Go Wild! (2001)	Watch Your Back (2004)	The Best of Guitar Shorty (2006)

Watch Your Back is the sixth studio album released by blues guitarist Guitar Shorty (David Kearney). The album was released on April 27, 2004 on CD by the label Alligator Records. It has been called a "welcome return for old fans and a perfect introduction for those new to Shorty's long career."

== Track listing ==
1. "Old School" (Jesse Harms) — 3:59
2. "Story of My Life" (Jesse Harms, Truitt) — 3:13
3. "I'm Gonna Leave You" (Truitt) — 5:44
4. "What She Don't Know" (Truitt) — 3:16
5. "I've Been Working" (Van Morrison) — 4:33
6. "Get Busy" (Jesse Harms) — 3:41
7. "Let My Guitar Do the Talking" (Jesse Harms, O'Keefe) — 4:50
8. "It Ain't the Fall That Kills You" (Jesse Harms) — 5:11
9. "A Little Less Conversation" (Davis, Strange) — 4:04
10. "Right Tool for the Job" (Truitt) — 3:44

== Personnel ==
- Guitar Shorty — guitar, vocals
- Sweet William Bouchard — bass
- Electric Vic Johnson — guitar (rhythm)
- Alvino Bennett — drums, percussion
- Jesse Harms — piano, producer, engineer, mixing

Production:

- Dan Monick — photography
- Brian Brinkerhoff — producer
- Dan Stout — mastering
- Marc Lipkin — liner notes
- Kevin Niemiec — design

== Reception ==
Professional ratings
Review scores
Source	Rating
Allmusic	4/5 stars
The Penguin Guide to Blues Recordings	3/4 stars

Allmusic calls the album Shorty's "most fiery and gutsy album yet, a tough and uncompromising slab of steely playing, no-nonsense singing, and solid songs." Reviewer Hal Horowitz says that he "rips into these ten tracks sounding like he's young, hungry, and ready to explode."

== Charts ==
Chart (2004)	Peak position
US Top Blues Albums (Billboard)	11
