= Phillip Walker (musician) =

American electric blues guitarist (1937–2010)

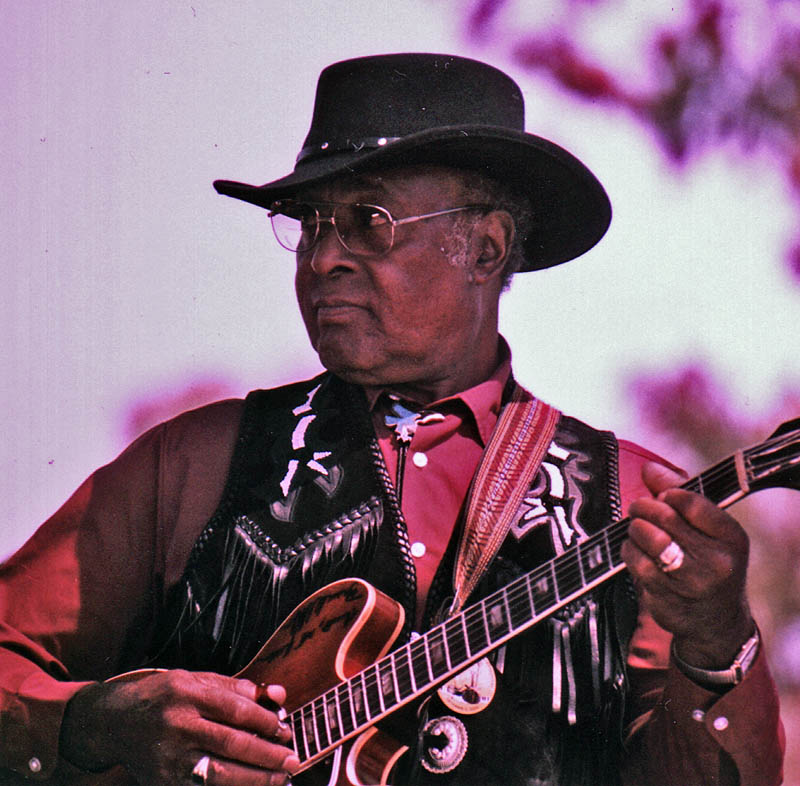
- Phillip Walker at the Long Beach Blues Festival, 2000

Background information
- Born: February 11, 1937; Welsh, Louisiana, United States
- Died: July 22, 2010 (aged 73) Palm Springs, California, U.S.
- Genres: Electric blues
- Occupation: Musician
- Instruments: Vocals, guitar
- Years active: 1953–2010
- Website: Phillipwalker.com

Phillip Walker (February 11, 1937 – July 22, 2010) was an American electric blues guitarist, most noted for his 1959 hit single, "Hello My Darling", produced by J. R. Fulbright. Although Walker continued playing throughout his life, he recorded more sparsely.

== Life and career ==
Walker grew up in Texas and learned to play guitar in his teens in Houston. He worked with Lonesome Sundown and Lonnie Brooks, and briefly joined Clifton Chenier's band in the 1950s. By the 1960s he was in a R&B band in Los Angeles with his wife Ina, who used the stage name Bea Bopp. His album Bottom of the Top was released by Playboy in 1973. Further albums were released on Black Top, Hightone, JSP, Joliet, and Rounder Records.

Walker was also known for his variety of styles and the changes he would often make for each album. Not until 1969 did he begin to record more regularly, when he joined with the record producer, Bruce Bromberg.

He appeared on show 237 of the WoodSongs Old-Time Radio Hour in 2002 when Live at Biscuits & Blues had just been released.

Walker's final studio release is Going Back Home (2007) on Delta Groove Productions.

== Death ==
On July 22, 2010, Delta Groove Productions issued an email statement regarding Walker's death: "It is with deepest sorrow that we report on the sudden and unexpected passing of legendary blues guitarist Phillip Walker. He died of apparent heart failure at 4:30 AM, early Thursday morning, July 22, 2010. He was 73 years old." In 2013 the Killer Blues Headstone Project placed a headstone for Phillip Walker at Evergreen Cemetery in Los Angeles.

== Discography ==
- 1973 Bottom of the Top (Playboy)
- 1977 Someday You'll Have These Blues (Joliet)
- 1980 The Blues Show! Live at Pit Inn (Yupiteru)
- 1982 From L.A. to L.A. (Rounder)
- 1984 Tough As I Want to Be (Rounder)
- 1988 Blues (Hightone)
- 1994 Big Blues from Texas (JSP)
- 1995 Working Girl Blues (Black Top)
- 1998 I Got a Sweet Tooth (Black Top)
- 1999 Lone Star Shootout with Lonnie Brooks and Long John Hunter (Alligator)
- 2002 Live at Biscuits & Blues (M.C.)
- 2007 Going Back Home (Delta Groove Productions)
