= Billie Jean Blues =

Compilation album by Guitar Shorty
- Released: August 27, 1996
- Genres: blues blues-rock
- Length: 58:59
- Label: Collectables

Guitar Shorty chronology
Get Wise to Yourself (1995)	Billie Jean Blues (1996)	Blues Is All Right (1996)

Professional ratings
Review scores
Source	Rating
Allmusic	3/5 stars
The Penguin Guide to Blues Recordings	2/4 stars

Billie Jean Blues is the first compilation album released by the blues guitarist Guitar Shorty. The album was on CD by the label Collectables on August 27, 1996, the same day as the compilation album Blues Is All Right. The album was produced by Swamp Dogg at several club sessions. The Penguin Guide to Blues Recordings says that "most of the club performances are over-extended, some self-defeatingly.

A reworked version of "Hey Joe" would later appear on Shorty's other compilation album, The Best of Guitar Shorty, in 2006.

== Track listing ==
1. "Shorty's Theme" (Kearney) — 7:36
2. "Hey Joe" (Billy Roberts) — 5:57
3. "Whole Lot of Loving" (Kearney) — 10:25
4. "Papa's Got a Brand New Bag" (James Brown) — 5:17
5. "Shorty's Theme, No. 2" (Kearney) — 11:19
6. "Billie Jean Blues" (Kearney) — 2:11
7. "We Don't Give a Shit & The Blues Is Alright" (Kearney / Little Milton) — 16:14

== Personnel ==
- Guitar Shorty — guitar, vocals
- Mark Marymont — liner notes
