= James "Thunderbird" Davis =

American guitarist and singer-songwriter (1938–1992)

- Born: James Louis Huston; November 10, 1938; Prichard, Alabama, U.S.
- Died: January 24, 1992 (aged 53) Saint Paul, Minnesota, U.S.
- Genres: Texas blues, electric blues
- Occupations: Guitarist, singer, songwriter
- Instruments: Guitar, human voice
- Years active: Late 1950s–1992
- Labels: Duke, Black Top

James Louis Huston, better known as James "Thunderbird" Davis (November 10, 1938 – January 24, 1992), was an American Texas blues and electric blues guitarist, singer and songwriter. He recorded several singles for Duke Records in the early 1960s, achieving moderate success with "Blue Monday" (1963). He dropped out of public attention until his career was revived in 1989 with the release of his album Check Out Time. Davis died on stage in 1992, at the age of 53.

== Biography ==
Davis was born in Prichard, Alabama, United States. He performed as a gospel singer in Alabama and came to the attention of Guitar Slim in 1957. Davis opened for Slim and was also a member of his backing band. Slim gave Davis his nickname after a drinking session which put Davis in a hospital, suffering the effects of Thunderbird wine, which Davis vowed to never touch again. Following Slim's death in 1959, Davis worked in the bands of Nappy Brown and Lloyd Lambert.

In 1961, Davis signed a recording contract with Don Robey's Duke Records, based in Houston. Initially, Robey used Davis as a demo singer for Bobby Bland, before Davis himself recorded several sides which were released as singles. Both "Blue Monday" (1963) and "Your Turn to Cry" (1964) were lauded critically, but none of his releases with Duke were commercially successful outside the Deep South. Davis left Duke in 1966. He continued to perform, as an opening act for Joe Tex, O. V. Wright, Muddy Waters and B.B. King. Lack of recognition led to his withdrawal from the music industry for almost 20 years.

In 1988, Davis was located in Houma, Louisiana, by Hammond Scott, a co-founder of Black Top Records. Many at the time thought that Davis had died. This reawakening led Davis to record his debut album, Check Out Time, in 1989, containing cover versions of songs originally recorded by Bobby Bland, James Carr, and Wynonie Harris, plus a number of Davis's own compositions, some dating back to the 1960s. The collection had a stellar backing band, including the guitarists Anson Funderburgh and Clarence Hollimon and the saxophonist Grady Gaines, who were named on the record sleeve as the Black Top All-Stars. A re-recording of a song he wrote, "Your Turn to Cry", recalled Davis's 1964 glory days. Billboard called Check Out Time the "blues comeback of the year."

In 1990, Davis was the guest vocalist on several tracks of the Hubert Sumlin album Healing Feeling.

In January 1992, two months before he was to record his second album, Davis collapsed and died of a heart attack on stage, halfway through a set at the Blues Saloon in Saint Paul, Minnesota. He was 53 years old.

== Discography ==
=== Singles ===
| A-side | B-side | Record label | Year of release |
|---|---|---|---|
| "What Else Is There to Do" | "Come to the Rock and Roll" | Duke Records | 1961 |
| "I'm Gonna Tell It on You" | "My Precious Darling" | Duke Records | 1962 |
| "Blue Monday" | "Sing" | Duke Records | 1963 |
| "Your Turn to Cry" | "Chains Around My Heart" | Duke Records | 1964 |
| "Ain't It Great" | "Bad Dream" | Duke Records | 1965 |

=== Albums ===
| Year | Title | Record label |
|---|---|---|
| 1989 | Check Out Time | Black Top Records |

== See also ==
- List of Texas blues musicians
- List of electric blues musicians
