= Margie Evans =

American blues singer and songwriter (1939–2021)

- Born: Marjorie Ann Johnson; July 17, 1939; Shreveport, Louisiana, United States
- Died: March 19, 2021 (aged 81)
- Genres: Blues
- Occupations: Singer, songwriter
- Instrument: Vocals
- Years active: 1960s–present
- Labels: Various including United Artists, ICA and L & R Records

Margie Evans (born Marjorie Ann Johnson; July 17, 1939 – March 19, 2021) was an American blues and gospel singer and songwriter. She started recording in the late 1960s and continued to record for five decades. She secured two hit singles on the US Billboard R&B chart. She has variously worked with Johnny Otis, Bobby Bland, T-Bone Walker, Big Joe Turner, Lowell Fulson, Joe Liggins, Lloyd Glenn, Willie Dixon, Al Bell, and Monk Higgins.

Her main influences were Bessie Smith, Ma Rainey, Big Maybelle and Big Mama Thornton.

In addition to her musicianship, Evans was noted as a motivational speaker and rights activist, as well as a promoter of the legacy of blues music.

== Life and career ==
Marjorie Ann Johnson was born in Shreveport, Louisiana, United States, in 1939. Raised as a devout church goer, Evans' early exposure to music was via gospel. In 1958, she moved to Los Angeles. She initially sang as a backing vocalist with Billy Ward between 1958 and 1964, before joining the Ron Marshall Orchestra between 1964 and 1969. She then successfully auditioned to join Johnny Otis Band. During her four-year stay there, she performed on The Johnny Otis Show Live at Monterey and Cuttin' Up albums. In addition to her recording and performing duties, Evans used her influence to help set up the Southern California Blues Society to help promote the art form through education and sponsorship.

Evans commenced her solo career in 1973, and found almost immediate chart success. Her track "Good Feeling" (United Artists 246) entered the R&B chart on June 30, 1973 for four weeks, reaching number 55. However, it was another four years before "Good Thing Queen – Part 1" (ICA 002) entered the same chart listing on July 9, 1977 for eight weeks, peaking at number 47. In 1975 she supplied backing vocals on Donald Byrd's album, Stepping into Tomorrow.

Also sandwiched between these hits, in November 1975, Evans appeared on German television filmed at the Berlin-based Jazz Tage concert with Johnny "Guitar" Watson, Bo Diddley and James Booker. Using Bobby Bland as her record producer and part-time song writing partner, Evans co-wrote the song "Soon As the Weather Breaks", which reached number 76 (R&B) for Bland in 1980.

In 1980, Evans performed at the San Francisco Blues Festival and Long Beach Blues Festival, repeating the feat at the latter a year later. Her touring saw Evans take part in the American Folk Blues Festivals in 1981, 1982 and 1985. In 1983, Evans was granted the Keepin' the Blues Alive Award by the Blues Foundation.

Performing into the early 1990s, Evans toured the United States, Canada and Europe, as well as appearing with Jay McShann at the Toronto Jazz Festival. In the same decade, Evans continued her welfare work, by helping to organise the 5-4 Optimist Club for children from the South Central Los Angeles district. Her 1996 album, Drowning in the Sea of Love was her last solo output. She recorded three albums with the Swiss blues singer Philipp Fankhauser in 1989, 1994 and 2016 respectively. In 2015 and 2016, Evans returned to the stage, guesting with Fankhauser in front of sold out venues throughout Switzerland.

She died on March 19, 2021, aged 81.

== Discography ==
=== Albums ===
Year	Title	Record label	Producer
1982	Mistreated Woman	L & R Records	Horst Lippmann and Margie Evans
1983	Another Blues Day	L & R Records	Horst Lippmann
1990	Too Late Rising Sun	Marvic Music Co.	François Love and Margie Evans
1996	Blues Classics	L & R Records	Horst Lippmann
1996	Drowning in the Sea of Love	Terra Nova Records	Robert Susz

=== Singles ===
Year	Title	Record label	Producer
1973	"Twenty Nine Ways"	Yambo Records	Willie Dixon
1973	"When I Make Love"	Yambo Records	Willie Dixon
1973	"Good Feeling"	United Artists	Monk Higgins
1977	"Good Thing Queen Part I"	ICA Recording Group	Monk Higgins
1979	"You Are To Me"	ICA Recording Group	Monk Higgins and Al Bell

=== Collaborations and compilation albums ===
Year	Title	Artist	Record label	Producer	Vocals on
1969	Cuttin' Up	Johnny Otis Show	Epic	Johnny Otis	Three tracks
1970	Live at Monterey!	Johnny Otis Show	Epic	Johnny Otis	One track
1981	American Folk Blues Festival	Various Artists	L & R Records	Horst Lippmann and Fritz Rau	Four tracks
1982	American Folk Blues Festival	Various Artists	L & R Records	Horst Lippmann and Fritz Rau	Three tracks
1982	American Folk Blues Festival	Various Artists	Amiga Records	Horst Lippmann and Fritz Rau	One track
1985	American Folk Blues Festival	Various Artists	L & R Records	Horst Lippmann and Fritz Rau	One track
1985	We Shall Walk Through The Valley in Peace	Rickey Grundy & Williams Family	L & R Records	Horst Lippmann and Margie Evans	Eight tracks
1989	Blues for the Lady	Philipp Fankhauser	Funk House Blues Prod.	Philipp Fankhauser	Four tracks
1994	Thun – San Francisco	Philipp Fankhauser	Funk House Blues Prod.	Philipp Fankhauser and H. Raymondaz	Three tracks
2016	Unplugged – Live at Mühle Hunziken	Philipp Fankhauser	Funk House Blues Prod.	Marco Jencarelli	Nine tracks

=== Music catalogue / compositions ===
Title	BMI Work #	Composer	Publisher
"Another Margie's Boogie"	# 47034	Margie Evans	
"Blue Blue Blues"	# 127657	Margie Evans, Cash McCall	
"Chilly Waters"	# 207852	Margie Evans, Cash McCall	
"Come To Me"	# 232686	Margie Evans, Cash McCall	
"Don't Throw No Stones At Me"	# 329426	Margie Evans, Cash McCall	
"European Holiday"	# 385217	Margie Evans, Cash McCall	
"Giving Up The Street For Love"	# 477042	Margie Evans, Robert Calvin Bland	
"God The First Good Thing Man"	# 485627	Margie Evans, Virginia P. Bland, Frank Lucas	Alvert Music, Bridgeport Music Inc.
"Going Away Blues"	# 487607	Margie Evans, David Clark	
"Good Thing Queen"	# 485627	Margie Evans, Virginia P. Bland, Frank Lucas	Alvert Music, Bridgeport Music Inc..
"Hurry Sundown"	# 599375	Margie Evans, Cash McCall	
"I Got The Restless Blues"	# 625566	Margie Evans	
"I'll Be There"	# 636988	Margie Evans, Cash McCall	
"I'm On My Way"	# 663001	Margie Evans, Virginia P. Bland, Isbell Alvertis	Alvert Music, Bridgeport Music Inc..
"I've Been Buked"	# 681815	Margie Evans	
"ICA Special"	# 699154	Margie Evans, Virginia P. Bland	Alvert Music, Bridgeport Music Inc..
"It Ain't Nothing But Common Sense"	# 734905	Margie Evans	
"It's A Shame"	# 734905	Margie Evans, Cash McCall	
"Let The Telephone Ring"	# 861502	Margie Evans, Cash McCall	
"Loser"	# 908825	Margie Evans, Cash McCall	

All information from the database of BMI.com

== See also ==
- List of blues musicians
