= Carol Fran =

American blues singer, pianist, and songwriter (1933–2021)

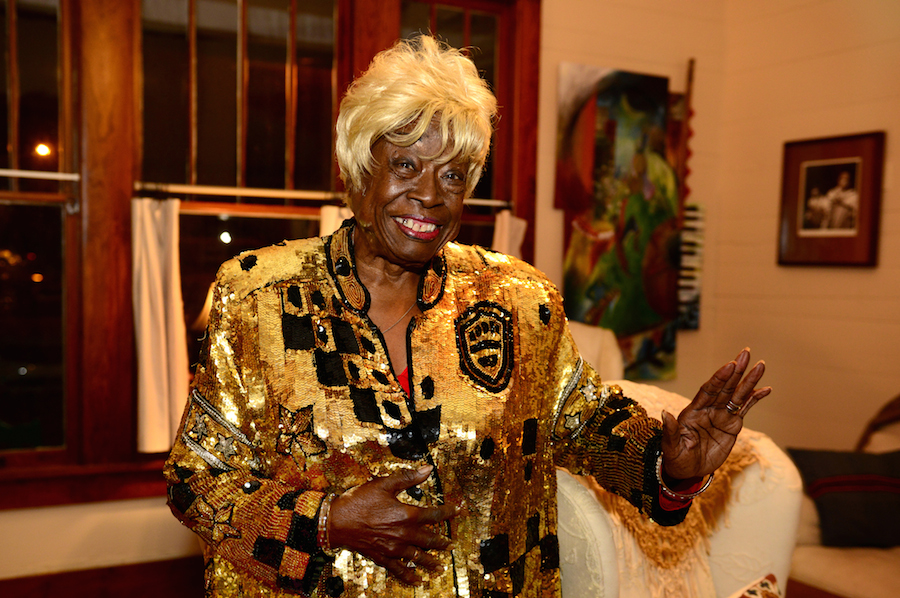
- Fran in 2014

Background information
- Born: Carol Augustus Anthony; October 23, 1933; Lafayette, Louisiana, U.S.
- Died: September 1, 2021 (aged 87) Lafayette, Louisiana, U.S.
- Genres: Electric blues, soul blues, swamp pop
- Occupations: Singer, pianist, songwriter
- Instruments: Vocals, piano
- Years active: Mid 1950s–2021
- Labels: Excello, Lyric, Port, Roulette, Black Top, JSP, others
- Formerly of: Guitar Slim, Nappy Brown, Lee Dorsey, Joe Tex, Clarence Hollimon, Guitar Shorty
- Spouse: Clarence Hollimon

Carol Fran (born Carol Augustus Anthony; October 23, 1933 – September 1, 2021) was an American soul blues singer, pianist, and songwriter, best known for her string of single releases in the 1950s and 1960s, and her later musical association with her husband, Clarence Hollimon. She released six albums since 1992 including four as a duo with Hollimon.

== Biography ==
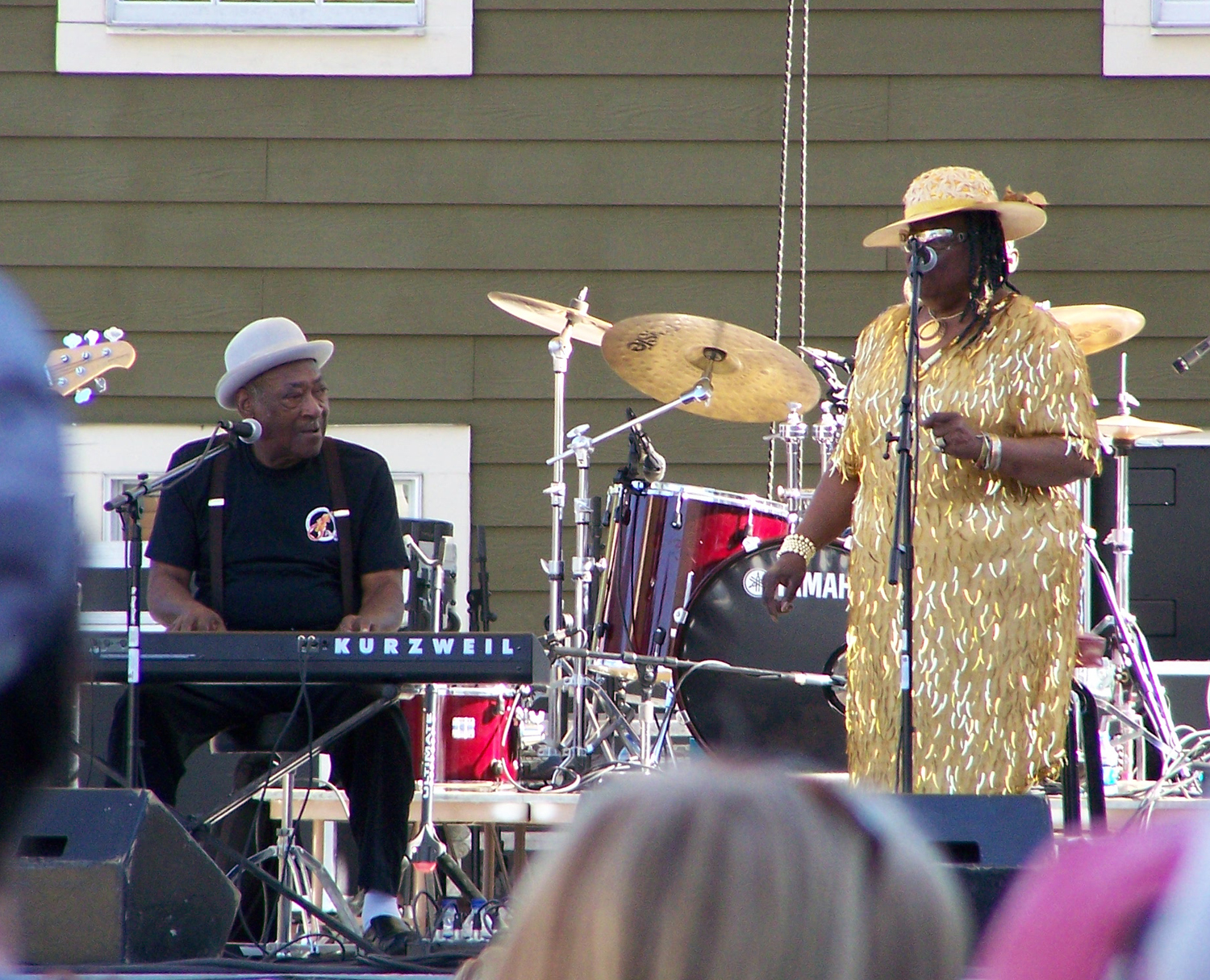
Henry Gray and guest Carol Fran playing at the Festival International in Lafayette, Louisiana on April 24, 2010

Carol Augustus Anthony was born in Lafayette, Louisiana. Commencing her jump blues singing career with Don Conway, she subsequently relocated to New Orleans. There she married a saxophone player, Bob Francois, which allowed a simple abbreviation to arrive at her stage name of Carol Fran. Establishing a musical presence around Bourbon Street, New Orleans, Fran also undertook a tour of Mexico. Her debut single was "Emmitt Lee", recorded in 1957 and released by Excello Records. Three more singles ensued, but lack of success saw Fran singing with Guitar Slim, and after his death in 1959, she then sang alongside Nappy Brown, Lee Dorsey, and Joe Tex.

Lyric Records then offered a recording contract to Fran. Her next offerings were a swamp pop version of "The Great Pretender" (1962) and a cover version of "Crying in the Chapel" (1964). Despite a subsequent reissue of the latter on Josie Records, her momentum was stalled by Elvis Presley's release of his own version. Her follow-up, "You Can't Stop Me," was enhanced by an arrangement by Sammy Lowe, whilst the Bobby Darin penned "A World Without You", also failed to find sufficient buyers. After another effort, "Any Day Love Walks In," she returned to the concert circuit.

In 1967, she signed to Roulette Records and issued a version of Brook Benton's "So Close." Success still eluded her and many recordings remained unreleased. Downhearted she concentrated on performing in clubs back in Louisiana. In 1982, Fran met the session guitarist Clarence Hollimon, and they went on to marry a year later and relocated to Texas. After appearing together in concert, Black Top Records released their 1992 album Soul Sensation! Elsewhere, in 1993, Fran contributed to Guitar Shorty's album, Topsy Turvy. In 1996, Fran and Hollimon appeared at the Long Beach Blues Festival.

See There! (1994) was her next album release, before another collaboration with Hollimon saw the issue of It's About Time (2000). However, Hollimon died the same year, and Fran moved back to Lafayette. She recorded her first solo effort Fran-tastic in New Orleans in October 2001 which was released the following year.

She appeared in the 2015 documentary film I Am the Blues.

Fran was a recipient of the 2013 National Heritage Fellowship awarded by the National Endowment for the Arts, which is the highest honor in the folk and traditional arts in the United States.

In 2020, Carol Fran released her first newly recorded album in 18 years titled All Of My Life: The Saint Agnes Sessions. This was an LP only release by Jazz Foundation of America. In the same year, her documentary film Carol Fran: Tous Les Jours C'est Pas La Même, Every Day Is Not The Same was released by Coulee Productions.

Fran died from post-COVID-19 complications at Ochsner Lafayette General Medical Center in Lafayette, Louisiana, on September 1, 2021, aged 87.

== Discography ==
=== Albums ===
Year	Title	Record label
1992	Soul Sensation! with Clarence Hollimon	Black Top
1994	See There! with Clarence Hollimon	Black Top
1995	Women in (E)motion with Clarence Hollimon	Tradition & Moderne
2000	It's About Time with Clarence Hollimon	JSP
2002	Fran-tastic	Sound of New Orleans
2020	All Of My Life: The Saint Agnes Sessions [LP]	Jazz Foundation of America

=== Compilation albums ===
Year	Title	Record label (and notes)
2005	The Complete Cala, Port and Roulette Recordings	Stateside (with Bettye LaVette)
2005	Our New Orleans: A Benefit Album for the Gulf Coast	Nonesuch (one track - "Tou' Les Jours Ç'est Pas la Même")

== See also ==
- List of electric blues musicians
- List of soul-blues musicians
