= Gary Wagner (DJ) =

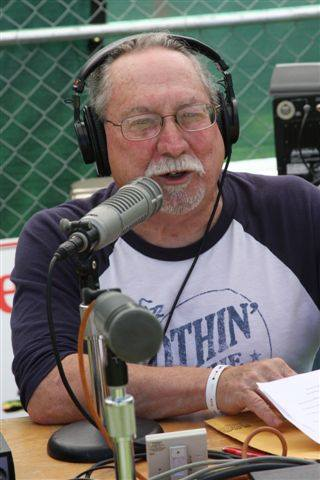
- Gary "The Wagman" Wagner

Background information
- Also known as: The Wagman
- Born: July 8, 1950 (age 76)
- Occupation: DJ
- Years active: 1965–present

Gary "The Wagman" Wagner (born July 8, 1950) is an American disc jockey, radio personality and host of the radio show Nothin’ But The Blues on radio station KKJZ 88.1 in Long Beach, California. The show is broadcast every Saturday from 2:00 PM until 6:00 PM, and Sunday from 2:00 PM until 7:00 PM PST. KKJZ (88.1 MHz FM, KJAZZ) is a non-commercial public radio station in Southern California broadcasting from the campus of California State University, Long Beach.

== Career ==
Wagner entered radio broadcasting in 1965 at the age of 15 by volunteering at station KASK in Ontario, California. While still in school he also worked at local stations KSPC, KACE, and KREL. After graduating Chaffey High School in Ontario, he got a job doing the all-night shift for KYMS in Santa Ana, California. 18 months later he was working at Los Angeles radio station KNAC in 1969 when he was called into the U.S. Army and served in Vietnam. While there, he worked at a 50,000 watt radio facility used by the Army for tactical purposes.

Upon returning from Vietnam, Wagner moved to Illinois and worked at several radio stations there including WTAO, WJKL, WROC, and WYFE. In 1979, while working at the progressive rock radio station WJKL in Elgin, he interviewed musician Muddy Waters and became a fan of the musical genre of American blues.

In 1992, Wagner was brought to Long Beach radio station KLON, now KKJZ, to host Nothin’ But the Blues. In 2001 he resigned over a dispute with KLON station management about fundraising practices. He returned as host of the show in 2009 when management of the radio station was taken over by Global Jazz.

From 2006 until 2011, Wagner was an instructor in Radio Broadcasting and faculty adviser for Long Beach City College radio station KCTY. He was thanked in 2011 by the college for his role in building the student radio station.

In 2012, the station's management Global Jazz cut a full day from the blues program. During his 2012 summer pledge drive, Wagner successfully led an on-air revolt to bring back the Saturday show. Listeners overwhelmingly stepped up to demonstrate their commitment to the blues, and the additional day of blues programming was reinstated.

He is a member of the Blues Foundation.

== Radio show style ==
Wagner personally selects each song played on each show, and does not use a pre-programmed computerized playlist. The show follows a free-form radio style that highlights his knowledge of early blues, contemporary blues, blues rock, and independent blues artists. In addition to being broadcast from Long Beach, California, Nothin' But The Blues is streamed online. In 1979, while working for WJKL in Elgin, Illinois, Wagner had a career changing opportunity to meet Muddy Waters, a seminal figure in blues music. The seed of his dedication to the blues genre was set.

== Long Beach Blues Festival ==
Wagner served as the host and emcee of the Long Beach Blues Festival from 1994 through 2000. The festival was created by Bernie Pearl as a fundraiser for KLON. It attracted tens of thousands of attendees over Labor Day weekend on the campus of California State University in Long Beach. As emcee, Wagner worked with most of the prominent American blues artists of those years, including Buddy Guy, Etta James, and John Lee Hooker.

== Recognition ==
Wagner is a successful fundraiser for non-profit radio. He is listed in Who's Who in Los Angeles Radio. He is also included in State of the Blues, a photographic essay of blues artists by Jeff Dunas. In 2011 Wagner was honored by Long Beach City College for his role in building the student radio station KCTYFM.ORG. On November 4, 2014, the Blues Foundation announced Wagner as the winner of the 'Keeping the Blues Alive Award' in the category of public radio. The KBAs are awarded by a select panel of blues professionals to those working actively to promote and document the music. Wagner was voted among the top five local radio personalities in Los Angeles for two consecutive years in a Los Angeles Times readers' poll.
