= We the People (Guitar Shorty album) =

Studio album by Guitar Shorty
- Released: August 15, 2006
- Genre: Blues, blues rock
- Label: Alligator
- Producer: Jerry "Wyzard" Seay; Brian Brinkerhoff

Guitar Shorty chronology
The Best of Guitar Shorty (2006)	We the People (2006)	Bare Knuckle (2010)

We the People is the seventh studio album by blues guitarist Guitar Shorty, released on compact disc on August 15, 2006. It was Shorty's second album with the Alligator Records label.

The album has been called "a timeless and completely current blues record." Reviewer Steve Leggett comments that "Shorty is a guitar player's guitar player, and this collection makes for a nice introduction to his studio style."

== Track listing ==
1. "We the People" (Guitar Shorty, Harms) — 4:20
2. "What Good Is Life?" ( Wyzard, Green, Guitar Shorty) — 4:04
3. "I Got Your Number" (Bob Halligan, Jr.) — 3:53
4. "Runaway Train" (Tommy McCoy) — 4:59
5. "Down That Road Again" (Guitar Shorty, Harms, Ross) — 4:57
6. "Fine Cadillac" (Grimaldi) — 5:51
7. "Can't Get Enough" (Wyzard) — 4:24
8. "A Hurt So Old" (Halligan) — 3:56
9. "Who Needs It?" (Williams) — 3:22
10. "Blues in My Blood" (Merv Goldsworthy) — 3:12
11. "Cost of Livin'" (Guitar Shorty, Wyzard) — 4:10
12. "Sonic Boom" (Harms) — 3:13

== Personnel ==
- Guitar Shorty — guitar, vocals
- Jake Andrews — rhythm guitar
- Alvino Bennett — drums
- Wyzard — bass, acoustic guitar
- John Thomas — keyboards

Production:

- James Bennett — assistant engineer
- Brian Brinkerhoff — producer
- Jerry "Wyzard" Seay - producer
- Larry Goetz — engineer, mixing
- Bruce Iglauer — mastering
- Dan Monick — photography
- Kevin Niemiec — package design
- Dan Stout — mastering
- Michael Trossman — logo

== Reception ==
Professional ratings
Review scores
Source	Rating
Allmusic	3.5/5 stars

AllMusic says that Shorty "radiates tremendous energy" and that "his guitar playing is rich, deep, and heavy as plutonium on these tracks." Reviewer Steve Leggett that the album has a nice balance between "hard rocking party numbers, straight out blues pieces, and strong political statement."

== Charts ==
Chart (2006)	Peak position
US Top Blues Albums (Billboard)	12
