= My Way or the Highway (Guitar Shorty album) =

Studio album by Guitar Shorty
- Released: 1991
- Genre: blues blues rock
- Length: 52:07
- Label: JSP
- Producer: Otis Grand

Guitar Shorty chronology
My Way or the Highway (1991)	Topsy Turvy (1993)

My Way or the Highway is the first major studio album released by blues guitarist Guitar Shorty (David Kearney), even though he had been in the business since the 1950s. The album is credited to "Guitar Shorty & The Otis Grand Blues Band"; it was at the behest and producing of Grand that Shorty made the record.

It was first released in 1991 on CD by the label JSP and was subsequently re-released in 1999 and 2005. Also, the tracks "Red Hot Mama" and "No Educated Woman" would later appear on Shorty's compilation album, The Best of Guitar Shorty, in 2006.

== Track listing ==
1. "No Educated Woman" (Kearney) — 6:03
2. "You Gave Me the Blues Baby" (Kearney) — 5:46
3. "Shorty Jumps In" (Grand, Kearney) — 6:14
4. "Down Through the Years" (Kearney) — 5:32
5. "Red Hot Mama" (Kearney) — 3:23
6. "Hot and Saucy, Short and Grand" (Grand, Kearney) — 6:39
7. "It's Too Late" (Kearney) — 11:30
8. "Kick Out" (Grand, Kearney) — 6:41
9. "My Way or the Highway" (Kearney) — 5:57

== Personnel ==
Band:

- Tony Ashton — organ (Hammond)
- Peter Beck — saxophone (alto, tenor)
- Buzz Brown — harmonica
- Otis Grand — guitar, producer
- Guitar Shorty — guitar, vocals
- Mike Hobart — saxophone (baritone)
- Dan Quinton — bass
- Daniel Strittmatter — drums

Production:

- Martin Atkinson — mixing
- Norman Darwen, John Stedman — liner notes

== Reception ==
Professional ratings
Review scores
Source	Rating
Allmusic	4/5 stars
The Penguin Guide to Blues Recordings	3/4 stars

Allmusic proclaims that the "acrobatic guitarist informed everyone he was alive and lively with this one." Shorty's playing is greatly enhanced by Grand; The Penguin Guide to Blues Recordings comments that they both perform well due to the "diversity of the material."
