= Smokey Wilson =

American singer

- Born: Robert Lee Wilson; July 11, 1936; Glen Allan, Mississippi, United States
- Died: September 8, 2015 (aged 79) Los Angeles, California, United States
- Genres: West Coast blues, Juke Joint blues
- Occupation(s): Guitarist, singer, songwriter
- Instrument(s): Guitar, vocals
- Years active: 1970s-2015
- Labels: P-Vine Records, various

Robert Lee "Smokey" Wilson (July 11, 1936 – September 8, 2015) was an American West Coast blues guitarist. He spent most of his career performing West Coast blues and juke joint blues in Los Angeles, California. He recorded a number of albums for record labels such as P-Vine Records, Bullseye Blues and Texmuse Records. His career got off to a late start, with international recognition eluding him until the 1990s.

== Biography ==
Wilson was born in Glen Allan, Mississippi, and raised in Lake Village, Arkansas, He played alongside Roosevelt "Booba" Barnes, Big Jack Johnson, and Frank Frost, before his move to Los Angeles in 1970. He opened the Pioneer Club in Watts, where he was the frontman of the house band. He also In booked blues musicians to perform at the club, including Big Joe Turner, Percy Mayfield, Pee Wee Crayton and Albert Collins. His down-to-earth guitar playing was typical of his Mississippi Delta background. "I bring the cotton-field with me," he said, "and I got the juke-joint inside."

Wilson released two albums on Big Town Records in the 1970s. His 1983 album, 88th Street Blues, for the Murray Brothers label (later reissued by Blind Pig Records) had contributions from Rod Piazza (harmonica and record producer) and Hollywood Fats (rhythm guitar). Wilson performed at the Long Beach Blues Festival in 1980, 1981 and 1999; having earlier appeared at the San Francisco Blues Festival in 1978.

Smoke n' Fire (1993) and The Real Deal (1995) followed, as Wilson's reputation began to grow as he reached his sixtieth year.

Whilst Wilson's years of residency at the Pioneer Club did little to secure nationwide recognition, he appeared on the PBS special Three Generation of Blues, with Robert Cray and John Lee Hooker. He also appeared in various television commercials, including UPN's "The Watcher," and FOX's "Divas", plus in a music video made by Babyface.

Wilson died in his sleep on September 8, 2015, in Los Angeles, California.

== Discography ==
- Blowin' Smoke (1977), Big Town; reissued on CD by P-Vine
- Sings the Blues (1978), Big Town; reissued on CD by P-Vine
- 88th Street Blues (1983); reissued in 1995 by Blind Pig
- With the William Clarke Band (1990), Black Magic
- Smoke n' Fire (1993), Bullseye Blues
- The Real Deal (1995), Bullseye Blues
- The Man from Mars (1997), Bullseye Blues
- Smokey Stack Lightnin' (1995), Vivid Sound; recorded in Japan
- Push (1999), previously unreleased Big Town recordings, P-Vine
- Ready to Roll (2003), with the Andy T Band, Marble

== See also ==
- List of electric blues musicians
