= The Real Deal (Smokey Wilson album) =

Studio album by Smokey Wilson
- Released: 1995
- Studio: Sunnyside
- Genre: Blues
- Label: Bullesye Blues
- Producer: Ron Levy

Smokey Wilson chronology
Smoke n' Fire (1993)	The Real Deal (1995)	The Man from Mars (1997)

The Real Deal is an album by the American musician Smokey Wilson, released in 1995. Wilson supported the album with a North American tour. It was nominated for a W. C. Handy Award for best traditional blues album.

== Production ==
The album was produced by Ron Levy. It includes covers of Eddie Taylor's "Bad Boy" and Muddy Waters's "Feel Like Going Home". Wilson wrote the remaining nine songs; he was primarily influenced by the styles of Mississippi blues musicians. Preston Shannon played rhythm guitar on The Real Deal.

== Critical reception ==
Professional ratings
Review scores
Source	Rating
AllMusic	4/5 stars
DownBeat	4/5 stars
The Encyclopedia of Popular Music	2/5 stars
MusicHound Blues: The Essential Album Guide	3.5/5 stars
The Penguin Guide to Blues Recordings	3/4 stars

The Chicago Tribune wrote that "Wilson brings a gruff, slashing Mississippi-bred attack to his uncompromising brand of contemporary blues." The Age stated: "Fronting a sturdy, rhythm section, Wilson brandishes a guitar that eases from West Coast panache to stinging, Mississippi Delta grit."

The Anchorage Daily News determined that, "at their best, his songs achieve a slow, coruscating effect enlivened by bright, sparsely picked notes on his guitar." The Boston Herald opined that the album's acoustic tracks "positively reek of the Mississippi juke joints in which the Los Angeles-based Wilson learned his trade from the masters."

AllMusic deemed the album "electric juke-joint nirvana." MusicHound Blues: The Essential Album Guide praised the "joyous, defiant" "Not Pickin' Your Cotton".

== Track listing ==
No.	Title	Length
1.	"Son of a ... Blues Player"
2.	"House in Hollywood"
3.	"Bad Boy"
4.	"Sittin' in Jackson"
5.	"Feel Like Going Home"
6.	"Rat Takin' Your Cheese"
7.	"In My Life"
8.	"Not Pickin' Your Cotton"
9.	"I Wanna Do It to You Baby"
10.	"When You Got Somebody"
11.	"Can't Make It Without You"
