= Blues Is All Right =

Studio album by Guitar Shorty
- Released: August 27, 1996
- Genre: blues blues rock
- Length: 68:48
- Label: Collectables
- Producer: Swamp Dogg

Guitar Shorty chronology
Billie Jean Blues (1996)	Blues Is All Right (1996)	Roll Over, Baby (1998)

Professional ratings
Review scores
Source	Rating
Allmusic	3/5 stars
The Penguin Guide to Blues Recordings	2.5/4 stars

Blues Is All Right is a studio album released by the blues guitarist Guitar Shorty (David Kearney). The album was released on CD by the label Collectables on August 27, 1996, the same day as the compilation album Billie Jean Blues. The album was produced by Swamp Dogg at several studios. The Penguin Guide to Blues Recordings says that this album is the superior of it and Billie Jean Blues due to more varied material.

== Track listing ==
1. "Introduction/The Blues Is All Right" (Kearney) — 12:19
2. "The Thrill Is Gone" (Rick Darnell, Roy Hawkins) — 8:45
3. "History of Jody" (Kearney) — 13:24
4. "How Blue Can You Get?" (Kearney) — 10:39
5. "Never Make Your Move Too Soon" (Kearney) — 10:21
6. "How Come My Dog Don't Bark (When You Come Around)" (Kearney) — 5:20
7. "Bump the Donkey" (Kearney) — 5:27
8. "Hard Life" (Kearney) — 2:33

== Personnel ==
- Guitar Shorty — guitar, vocals
- Mark Marymont — liner notes
