= The Man from Mars (album) =

Studio album by Smokey Wilson
- Released: 1997
- Genre: Blues, R&B
- Label: Bullseye Blues
- Producer: Ron Levy

Smokey Wilson chronology
The Real Deal (1995)	The Man from Mars (1997)	Push (1999)

The Man from Mars is an album by the American musician Smokey Wilson, released in 1997. Wilson supported the album with a North American tour. The Man from Mars was nominated for a W. C. Handy Award for best contemporary blues album.

== Production ==
The album was produced by Ron Levy, who used a rhythm section of Dallas musicians. Wilson wrote eight of its songs. "Louise" was written by Howlin' Wolf, one of Wilson's primary influences; "44 Blues" is a cover of Wolf's version of the standard. "Easy Baby" was written by Magic Sam. "Something Inside of Me" is a cover of the Elmore James song. "Thanks for Making Me a Star" is about staying humble after becoming famous.

== Critical reception ==
Professional ratings
Review scores
Source	Rating
AllMusic	3/5 stars
Edmonton Journal	3.5/5 stars
The Indianapolis Star	3/4 stars
Los Angeles Daily News	3/4 stars
MusicHound Blues: The Essential Album Guide	3/5 stars
The Penguin Guide to Blues Recordings	3/4 stars

The Los Angeles Daily News wrote that the album "recalls the grit of a '50s juke joint... Wilson's slash and burn guitaring is a breath of fresh air at a time when a generation of tepid teen players are being taken seriously as blues musicians." The Washington Post stated that "thick, punchy horn riffs dominate nearly every song and force Wilson to sharpen the edge on his lead-guitar licks and to pump up his hollering vocals to make himself felt." The Edmonton Journal praised the "shuffles and honky tonk ballads and roaring r'n'b horn workouts."

Guitar Player said that Wilson's "stinging tone, swift vibrato and staccato blasts travel from string-strangling '50s blues to R&B-driven '70s rock." The Record determined that Wilson's "incendiary slide-guitar work carries on the Elmore James tradition, while his gravel-voiced singing recalls Howlin' Wolf and Tyrone Davis." The Indianapolis Star noted that "the juke-joint atmosphere Wilson embraced while cutting his teeth in the profession is evident."

AllMusic wrote that "Levy keeps Wilson's guitar tone at sting and bite level 10 and his vocals right up front and toasty, surrounding him with a solid rhythm section and spare horn stabs."

== Track listing ==
No.	Title	Length
1.	"Thanks for Making Me a Star"
2.	"Something Inside of Me"
3.	"The Man from Mars"
4.	"44 Blues"
5.	"Louise"
6.	"Too Drunk to Drive"
7.	"You Don't Drink What I Drink"
8.	"Black Widow"
9.	"Just Like a Mountain"
10.	"Don't Want to Tangle with Me"
11.	"Doctor Blues"
12.	"Easy Baby"
