= KKJZ =

- Long Beach, California; United States
- Broadcast area: Greater Los Angeles
- Frequency: 88.1 MHz (HD Radio)
- Branding: KJazz 88.1

Programming
- Format: Jazz; blues
- Subchannels: HD2: Jazz "Bebop Channel"; HD3: College radio "22 West Radio"

Ownership
- Owner: California State University, Long Beach Research Foundation
- Operator: Global Jazz, Inc.

History
- First air date: January 3, 1950
- Former call signs: KLON (1950–2002)
- Call sign meaning: Jazz

Technical information
- Licensing authority: FCC
- Facility ID: 8197
- Class: B
- ERP: 30,000 watts (directional)
- HAAT: 137 meters (449 ft)
- Transmitter coordinates: 33°47′58″N 118°9′43″W

Links
- Public license information: Public file; LMS
- Webcast: Listen live; Listen live (HD2); Listen live (HD3)
- Website: kkjz.org; 22westmedia.com (HD3)

KKJZ (88.1 FM, "KJazz 88.1") is a non-commercial public radio station in Southern California. The station is the #1 full-time jazz and blues station in the United States.

The California State University, Long Beach Research Foundation owns the non-commercial broadcast license for KKJZ; as a public radio station, it is funded by contributions from listener-members and other donors. Global Jazz, Inc. programs and manages the radio station, under the direction of the CSULB Research Foundation.

The station's antenna is located on the top of Signal Hill in the Long Beach area. KKJZ is also available through the internet on www.jazzandblues.org streaming audio and on the station's mobile apps.

== HD programming ==
KKJZ-HD1 (HD Radio) is a simulcast of the analog signal, which bills itself as "America's Jazz and Blues Station"; the format features the best in straight-ahead jazz, Latin jazz, and blues with artists such as Miles Davis, B.B. King, Diana Krall, Herbie Hancock, Ella Fitzgerald, Cal Tjader, Sergio Mendes, and Dave Brubeck.

KKJZ-HD2 is "The Bebop Channel".

KKJZ-HD3 is known as "22 West Radio", a station run and programmed by the students and faculty at California State University Long Beach.

== History ==
On January 3, 1950, the station began broadcasting with the call letters 'KLON' and was owned by the Long Beach Unified School District. The station has been broadcasting jazz since 1981, when it was transferred to CSULB. The station changed its call sign to 'KKJZ' in July 2002. Prior to its Southern California location, the call letters KKJZ belonged to "Smooth Jazz 106.7" in Portland, Oregon.

The station had been broadcasting with 6,500 watts ERP, but in December 2004 the station upgraded its transmitter to 30,000 watts as well as an HD Radio digital signal. The station began broadcasting with 30,000 watts full-time on March 14, 2005.

The owner of KKJZ's non-commercial broadcast license, the California State University, Long Beach Research Foundation, has contracted with Global Jazz, Inc., to program and manage the station. This agreement became effective on April 21, 2007. Prior to that date the management and programming were performed by Pacific Public Radio, an organization created by the CSULB Foundation.

K-Jazz logo used until 2011.

The Arbitron ratings in 2008 indicated KKJZ had the most listeners of all jazz stations in the United States and the fifth-highest number of listeners of public radio in the country.

On May 2, 2011, five time GRAMMY nominee pianist David Benoit made his debut as a morning host on the station.

== Music events ==
Long-time jazz disc jockey Chuck Niles (aka "Bebop Charlie") is the only jazz disc jockey to have a star on the Hollywood Walk of Fame. Horace Silver, Louie Bellson, and Bob Florence ("Bebop Charlie", "Nilestones"), and others have written tunes for “Carlitos Niles”. Chuck Niles was a DJ for KKJZ from 1990 until he died in 2004. Niles also appeared in small parts in several films.

KJAZZ is the official emergency broadcast station for the City of Long Beach.

== See also ==
- Campus radio
- List of college radio stations in the United States
- List of jazz radio stations in the United States
