= Grady Gaines =

American saxophonist (1934–2021)

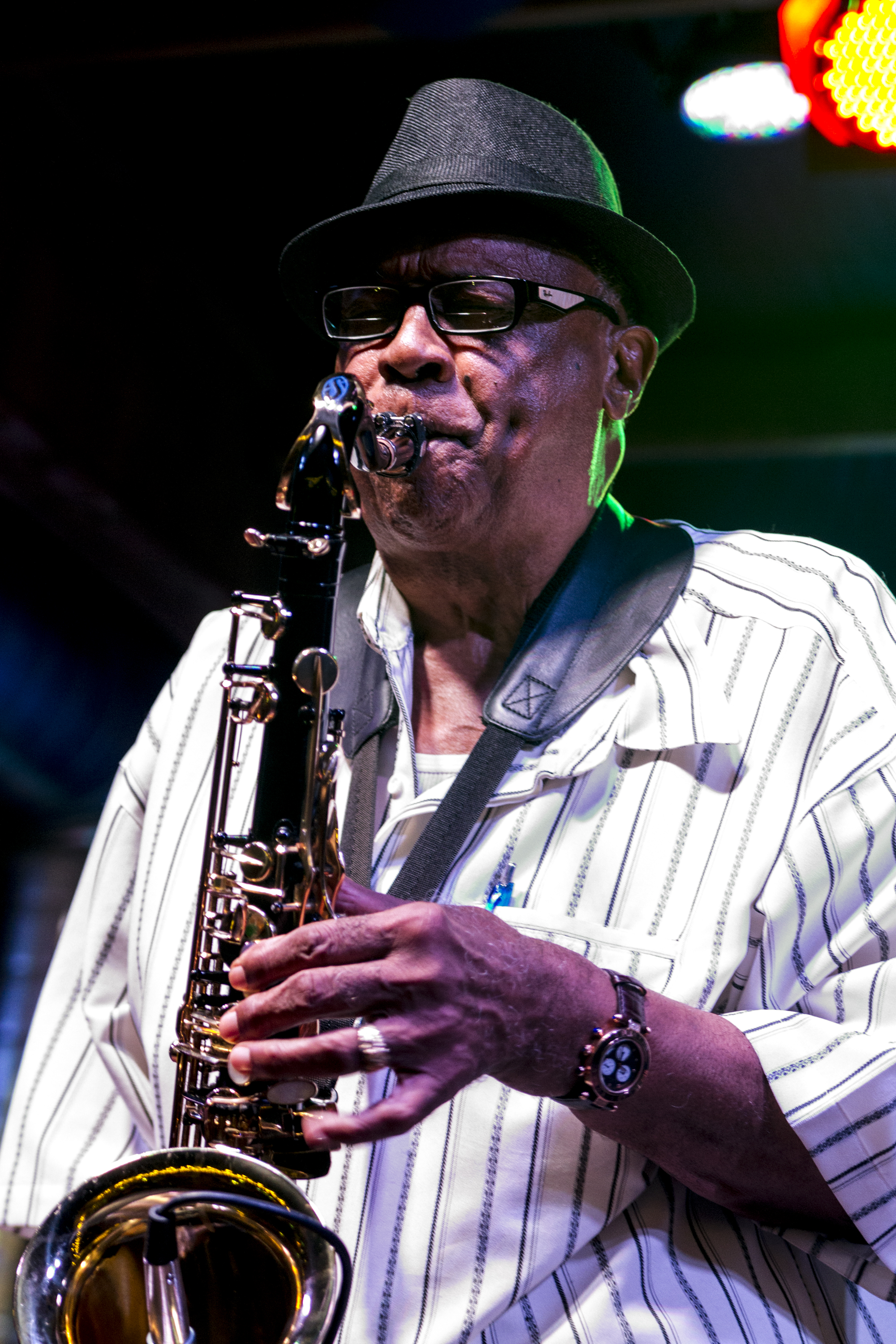
- Gaines performing in 2014
- Born: May 14, 1934; Waskom, Texas, U.S.
- Died: January 29, 2021 (aged 86)
- Occupation: Saxophonist
- Known for: The Upsetters, The Texas Upsetters
- Spouse: Nell Gaines
- Relatives: Roy Gaines (brother)
- Musical career
- Genres: Texas blues, electric blues
- Instrument: Tenor saxophone
- Years active: Early 1950s–2021
- Label: Black Top
- Website: Official website

Grady Gaines (May 14, 1934 – January 29, 2021) was an American electric blues, Texas blues and jazz blues tenor saxophonist, who performed and recorded with Little Richard in the 1950s. He backed other musicians such as Dee Clark, Little Willie John, Sam Cooke, James Brown, Jackie Wilson, and Joe Tex. He released three albums.

== Early life ==
Gaines was born on May 14, 1934, in Waskom, Texas. Gaines's brother was Roy. In 1943, Gaines family moved to Houston, Texas. Gaines grew up in the Fifth Ward, a racially segregated neighborhood of Houston, Texas. Gaines attended E. L. Smith Junior High School.

== Career ==
Gaines was playing his saxophone at The Whispering Pines.

Gaines worked as a session musician for Peacock Records. He played on Big Walter Price's "Pack Fair and Square" and Clarence "Gatemouth" Brown's "Dirty Work at the Crossroads," before joining Little Richard's fledgling backing band, the Upsetters, as its leader in 1955. Gaines recorded infrequently, but he played on Richard's "Keep a Knockin'" and "Ooh! My Soul."

The Upsetters carried on after Richard "retired" in 1957. They toured with Dee Clark, Little Willie John, James Brown, Jackie Wilson, and Joe Tex. The band recorded for Vee-Jay Records in 1958 backing Clark. Gaines also led Sam Cooke's backing band until Cooke's death. Several recording sessions followed for Gaines and his band for various labels, including Vee-Jay, Gee and Fire.

Once the Upsetters disbanded, Grady toured with Millie Jackson and Curtis Mayfield. He stopped playing in 1980.

In 1980, Gaines became a transportation manager for Holiday Inn and later Sheraton.

In 1985, Gaines re-formed a band, The Texas Upsetters, and played concerts in Houston before recording Full Gain (1988), Horn of Plenty (1992), and Jump Start (2002).

Gaines performed in 1989 and 1996 at the Long Beach Blues Festival. As of January 2013, he continued to perform with the Texas Upsetters for private parties and wedding receptions and for public events, such as the Big Easy Social & Pleasure Club in Houston's Rice Village neighborhood.

== Discography ==
- Full Gain (1988), Black Top Records
- Horn of Plenty (1992), Black Top
- Jump Start (2002), Gulf Coast Entertainment

== Awards ==
- 1993 Blues Artist of the Year. Houston Juneteenth Festival.
- 2001 Local Musician of the Year. Houston Press.

== Personal life ==
Gaines' wife was Nell Gaines, they remained married until his death in 2021.

Gaines' brother Roy went on to play guitar on Bobby Bland's 1955 hit single "It's My Life Baby".

== See also ==
- List of Texas blues musicians
- List of electric blues musicians
