= W. C. Clark =

American singer-songwriter (1939–2024)

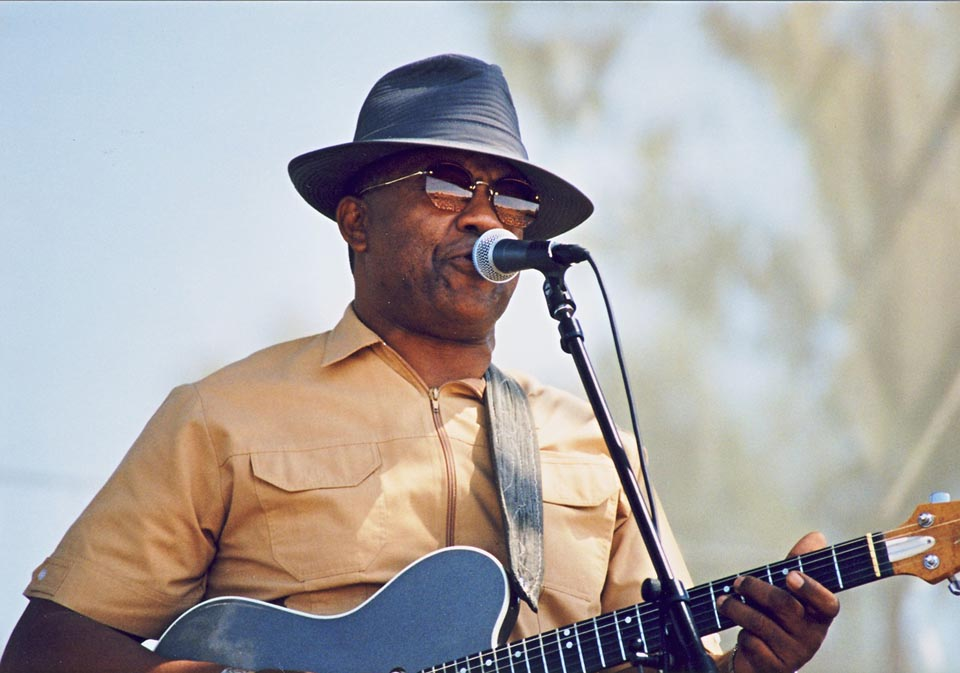
- W. C. Clark in 1996

Background information
- Also known as: Godfather of Austin Blues
- Born: Wesley Curley Clark; November 16, 1939; Austin, Texas. U.S.
- Died: March 2, 2024 (aged 84)
- Genres: Blues, R&B
- Occupations: Musician, singer
- Instruments: Guitar, vocals
- Years active: 1970–2024
- Labels: Black Top Records; Alligator Records
- Formerly of: Triple Threat Revue; W. C. Clark Blues Revue
- Website: wcclark.com

Wesley Curley Clark (November 16, 1939 – March 2, 2024) was an American blues musician. He is known as the "Godfather of Austin Blues" for his influence on the Austin, Texas, blues scene since the late 1960s.

== Biography ==
Wesley Curley Clark was born and raised in Austin, Texas, where he sang gospel music in the choir as a young boy. In the early 1950s, at age 14, he learned the guitar, and later experimented with blues and jazz on the bass guitar.

By the early 1960s, he began attracting the attention of Texas blues performers such as Big Joe Turner, Albert Collins and Little Johnny Taylor.

In the late 1960s, he joined the Joe Tex's R&B band and left Austin, where he thought that the R&B scene had died. However, during a tour with the band back in Austin, Clark sat in on bass with younger Austin locals Jimmie Vaughan and Paul Ray at an East Austin club. After the session playing with Vaughan and Ray, Clark changed his mind about Austin.

Clark left Joe Tex two weeks later and moved back to Austin, where he remained to guide and inspire numerous Austin musicians and lay the foundation of the prolific Austin blues and rock scene of the 1970s and beyond. He formed several bands with various names, which included as members Jimmie Vaughan and Angela Strehli.

In 1975, Clark formed the W. C. Clark Blues Revue. Through the 1980s, the band played venues with international greats such as James Brown, B.B. King, Albert King, Freddy King, Sam and Dave, Elvin Bishop and Bobby Blue Bland.

From late September 1977 to May 1978, Clark played in an Austin blues quintet named Triple Threat Revue, with Stevie Ray Vaughan and Lou Ann Barton.

In the early 1980s, Clark had taught future rock prodigy brothers Charlie Sexton and Will Sexton how to play guitar while they were young.

In 1990, Clark appeared on the PBS music television program Austin City Limits with his group W. C. Clark Blues Revue, from a show taped on October 10, 1989, in celebration of his 50th birthday, along with Stevie Ray Vaughan, Jimmie Vaughan and Kim Wilson of The Fabulous Thunderbirds, Lou Ann Barton, Angela Strehli and his former protégé Will Sexton.

In March 1997, on the eve of Austin's South by Southwest music festival, as Clark and his band were returning from a show in Milwaukee, their van, driven by Clark, veered off the highway and down a steep embankment near Sherman, Texas, injuring his arm and killing his fiancée Brenda Jasek and his drummer Pedro Alcoser Jr. The album Lover's Plea followed, containing the single "Are You Here, Are You There?", in memory of Jasek.

In 2016, he appeared with his song "Rough Edges" on the album Texas Blues Voices by Italian harmonica player and Grammy Nominee Fabrizio Poggi.

Clark died on March 2, 2024, at age 84. He had been in hospice care since February 2024.

== Discography ==
- 1987 Something for Everybody (Drippin' DR-1001) (LP; under the name W.C. Clark Blues Revue)
- 1994 Heart Of Gold (Black Top BT-1103)
- 1995 Texas Soul (Black Top BT-1131)
- 1998 Lover's Plea (Black Top BT-1145)
- 2002 From Austin With Soul (Alligator ALCD 4884)
- 2004 Deep In The Heart (Alligator ALCD 4897)
- 2011 Were You There (self released)
- 2018 W. C. Clark (self released)

== See also ==
- Music of Austin
