= Mark "Kaz" Kazanoff =

American jazz musician

Mark "Kaz" Kazanoff (born October 14, 1949, Northampton, Massachusetts, United States) is an American jazz and blues saxophonist, arranger, and record producer living in Austin, Texas.

Kazanoff has been nominated for multiple awards in the category of Horn Instrumentals, including an Austin Music Award in 1988, a Grammy Award for Delbert McClinton's Live from Austin in 1989, numerous Blues Music Awards, and a Blues Foundation Award in 2016.

Living in Chicago in his early twenties, Kazanoff was influenced by and played with jazz and blues musicians Big Walter Horton, Little Walter, James Cotton, Magic Sam, Hound Dog Taylor, Muddy Waters and Otis Rush.

He joined the house band of Austin blues venue Antones in 1982, where he has performed for 35 years. Kazanoff continues to play with local Texas musicians including Jimmie Vaughan, Marcia Ball, WC Clark, Red Young, Miss Lavelle White, and Anson Funderburgh.

In 2016, Kazanoff produced and played tenor sax on R&B singer Ina Forsman's self-titled debut album. Other productions include Australian blues artist Fiona Boyes' Lucky 13 in 2006, WC Clark's Deep in the Heart in 2004, and Pat Boyack's record Voices from the Street, also in 2004.

In 1997, Kazanoff started a three-piece horn section, the Texas Horns, with Al Gomez and John Mills. In 2015, the Texas Horns released their first album, Blues Gotta Holda Me, on the Vizztone Label. Described as "a horn-driven, blues-drenched celebration," the album includes WC Clark, Marcia Ball, Johnny Nicholas, Danny Levin, and Anson Funderburgh. The Texas Horns have performed with American bands such as the Allman Brothers, and are featured at international festivals including The Ottawa Bluesfest, where they have been house band for over 15 years. His current band, The Recuperators, includes guitarist Derek O'Brien and keyboard/vocalist Nick Connolly.
