= Clarence Hollimon =

American guitarist (1937–2000)

- Born: Milton Howard Clarence Hollimon; October 24, 1937; Fifth Ward, Houston, Texas, US
- Died: April 23, 2000 (aged 62) Houston, Texas, US
- Genres: Blues; jazz
- Instrument: Guitar
- Labels: Duke; Peacock; Black Top; JSP
- Spouse: Carol Fran (m. 1983)

Milton "Gristle" Howard Clarence Hollimon (October 24, 1937 – April 23, 2000) was an American guitarist.

== Biography ==
Hollimon was born in Fifth Ward, Houston, on October 24, 1937. He dropped out of Wheatley High School to play full time for Bill Harvey's Orchestra. He had worked as a session musician for Duke and Peacock Records, until 1962, when he moved to New York City to work as a session musician for Scepter Records.

He returned to Houston the following year and resumed work with Duke and Peacock. He also began working with Arnett Cobb while continuing to work independently. In the late 1970s and early 1980s, his music would slow due to substance abuse.

In 1983, he married fellow blues musician Carol Fran, whom he previously met at the Dew Drop Inn in 1958. They billed themselves as Fran and Hollimon, releasing four albums together. They also performed at the 1996 Summer Olympics opening ceremony. He was also featured on Lavelle White's albums in his later life. He died on April 23, 2000, in his home in Houston, aged 62.

== Discography ==
All releases were with Carol Fran.

- Soul Sensation! (Black Top; 1992)
- Women In (E)motion Festival (Tradition & Moderne; 1994)
- See There! (Black Top; 1994)
- It's About Time (JSP; 2000)
