= Lee Allen Zeno =

American bassist (1954–2026)

Lee Allen Zeno (October 6, 1954 – May 3, 2026) was an American bassist.

== Life and career ==
Zeno was born in Carencro Louisiana, on October 6, 1954. He was the longtime bassist for Buckwheat Zydeco. He was also a session musician, contributing to the works of Bobby Rush, Irma Thomas and The Neville Brothers.

As early as 1980 Lee Allen Zeno has studio credits with Buckwheat Zydeco, Solomon Burke, Charlie Rich, Marcia Ball, Tracy Nelson, Kenny Neal, Bobby Rush, Irma Thomas, the Neville Brothers and Boozoo Chavis. He has earned credits on more than 73 singles, albums etc. Zenos bass playing helped Buckwheat and his son (Buckwheat Zydeco Jr.) both become Grammy Winners. He also helped Buckwheat Zydeco become to date the only zydeco band to win an Emmy.

He earned two Grammy Awards. His first was at the 52nd Annual Grammy Awards for his contribution to the Buckwheat Zydeco album Lay Your Burden Down. At the 66th Annual Grammy Awards, he won the Best Regional Roots Music Album for his work on the Buckwheat Zydeco Jr. album New Beginnings. He also was nominated during the 64th Annual Grammy Awards for his contribution to the Corey Ledet album Corey Ledet Zydeco.

Zeno is also credited with contributing to "A Tribute to the King of Zydeco," which won a Grammy at the 68th Grammy awards.

Zeno died from leukemia on May 3, 2026, at the age of 71.
