= Guitar Shorty =

American blues guitarist (1934–2022)

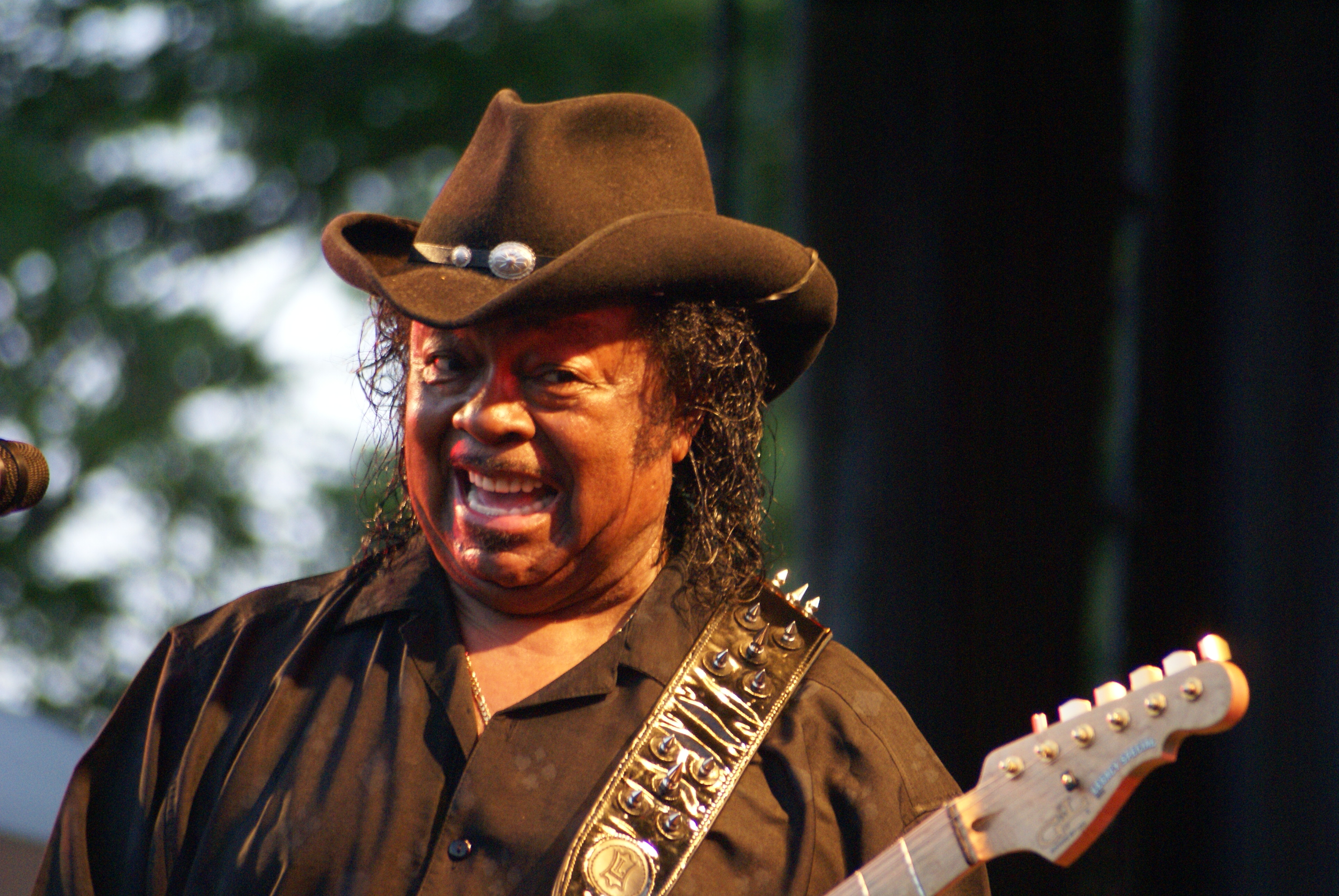
- Guitar Shorty at the 2008 Ottawa Bluesfest

Background information
- Born: David William Kearney; September 8, 1934; Houston, Texas, or Loughman, Florida, U.S.
- Died: April 20, 2022 (aged 87) Los Angeles, California, U.S.
- Genres: Blues
- Occupation: Musician
- Instrument: Guitar
- Years active: 1950s–2022
- Labels: Black Top, Alligator
- Website: http://www.guitarshorty.com

David William Kearney (September 8, 1934 – April 20, 2022), known as Guitar Shorty, was an American blues guitarist, singer, and songwriter. He was known for his explosive guitar style and wild stage antics. Credited with influencing both Jimi Hendrix and Buddy Guy, Guitar Shorty recorded and toured from the 1950s until the 2020s. In 2017, Billboard magazine said, "his galvanizing guitar work defines modern, top-of-the-line blues-rock. His vocals remain as forceful as ever. Righteous shuffles...blistering, sinuous guitar solos."

== History ==
Shorty was born in either Houston, Texas, or Loughman, Florida. He grew up mainly in Kissimmee, Florida. He was taught by his uncle to play the guitar at an early age, and began leading a band not long after. During his time in Tampa Bay, Florida, at age 16 he received his nickname, Guitar Shorty, when it mysteriously showed up on the marquee of the club he was playing as 'The Walter Johnson Band featuring Guitar Shorty.' He steadily began to garner accolades from his peers and, soon after, he joined the Ray Charles Band for a year. He recorded his first single in 1957, "You Don't Treat Me Right", for the Cobra label under the direction of Willie Dixon, after Dixon saw him playing with the Walter Johnson Orchestra.

While in New Orleans, Shorty also fronted his own band which played regularly at the Dew Drop Inn where he was joined by special guests such as T-Bone Walker, Big Joe Turner and Little Richard. Not one to stay in one place long, Shorty next moved to the West Coast at 19 to play with Sam Cooke. He played up and down the west coast and Canada until he met his future wife, Marsha or Marcia, in Seattle, Washington. Marsha was the step-sister of Jimi Hendrix. Hendrix was so enthralled with Shorty's playing, he went AWOL several times from his Army base to see him perform. Shorty introduced Hendrix to the wah pedal and loaned him one when Hendrix could not afford to buy his own. Shorty married Marsha in 1962 and they separated in 1970.

Shorty gigged steadily through the late 1950s and 1960s. During the 1970s, he worked as a mechanic, playing music at nights and on weekends. He again became a full-time musician in 1975, struggling at times to make ends meet. In 1976 he made an appearance on Chuck Barris' Gong Show, winning first prize for performing the song, "They Call Me Guitar Shorty", while balanced on his head.

In 2002, he was featured on the Bo Diddley tribute album Hey Bo Diddley – A Tribute!, performing the song "Don't Let It Go (Hold On To What You Got)". He joined Alligator Records in 2004. His album that year, Watch Your Back and his 2006 album We the People both charted on the Billboard Top Blues Albums at numbers eleven and twelve, respectively. Billboard said of We The People, "it's difficult to imagine that he ever tracks a better album than this one."

On May 10, 2016, his touring van and trailer was stolen with most of his instruments and gear. An online fundraiser and several benefit concerts were organized, by his guitar player Crazy Tomes, in Los Angeles to help him with the financial losses, including a special performance with The Chambers Brothers.

Guitar Shorty released his album Trying To Find My Way Back in 2019, produced by Jerry "Swamp Dogg" Williams and Larry "MoogStar" Clemon. He also played lead guitar on Crazy Tomes' single "Livin' on Memories", released in 2020. He continued to tour with his band of many years that included Crazy Tomes (guitar and vocals), Malcolm Lukens (keyboards), Wadada Khufu (bass) and Dan Gerass (drums).

He died on April 20, 2022, in Los Angeles, at the age of 87. He appears in the 2024 documentary film Swamp Dogg Gets His Pool Painted, which was in production at the time of Guitar Shorty's death.

== Discography ==
- On the Rampage (Olive Branch, 1989)
- My Way or the Highway (JSP, 1991)
- Topsy Turvy (Black Top, 1993)
- Get Wise to Yourself (Black Top, 1995)
- Billie Jean Blues (Collectables, August 27, 1996)
- The Blues Is All Right (Collectables, August 27, 1996)
- Roll Over, Baby (Black Top, 1998)
- I Go Wild! (Evidence, 2001)
- Watch Your Back (Alligator, 2004)
- The Best of Guitar Shorty: The Long and Short of It (Shout! Factory, June 2006)
- We the People (Alligator, August 2006)
- Bare Knuckle (Alligator, March 2010)
- How Blue Can You Get (Janblues, December 2010) reissue of The Blues Is All Right
- Trying To Find My Way Back (S.D.E.G./Essential Media Group, 2019) [2CD]
