= Black Top Records =

Black Top Records was an American, New Orleans, Louisiana-based independent record label, founded in 1981 by brothers Nauman S. Scott, III and Hammond Scott. The label specialized in blues and R&B music. The first release was "Talk To You By Hand" by Anson Funderburgh & the Rockets. The artist roster included Earl King, Snooks Eaglin, Lee Rocker, Guitar Shorty, and Robert Ward, among others.

== History ==
The label started out primarily as a blues label, and soon stretched out to New Orleans R&B and American roots music. Black Top especially excelled in discovering obscure talents. Many of the label's artists such as Robert Ward, Carol Fran, Clarence Hollimon, and W. C. Clark were either relatively unknown, or had been away from record contracts and/or the music industry for many years. The label used a variety of musicians on its recordings, including many from the New Orleans music community. Examples include George Porter Jr., David Torkanowsky, Herman V. Ernest III, and Sammy Berfect; Black Top also often hired the members of the Antone's house band from Austin, Texas, including Mark "Kaz" Kazanoff on saxophone. Pianist and organist Nick Connolly, also based in Austin, was another musician who recorded several sessions. Although Black Top concentrated on recording new material for the most part, it also handled some vintage reissues from artists such as Earl Hooker and Hollywood Fats.

Initially, its catalog was distributed by Rounder Records. When the contract ended in the mid-nineties, Passport Music took over distribution for a brief period of time; Chicago blues label Alligator Records distributed the Black Top catalog after that.

After releasing well over 100 albums, the label closed in 1999. Nauman Scott died in 2002. Hammond Scott sold the rights of the catalog, and some releases were reissued on labels such as Varèse Sarabande, Fuel 2000, and Shout! Factory. In 2006, P-Vine Records in Japan acquired the worldwide rights to them.

== Artists ==
- Solomon Burke
- Earl King
- Anson Funderburgh & The Rockets (featuring Sam Myers)
- Mike Morgan and the Crawl
- Maria Muldaur
- Snooks Eaglin
- James Harman Band
- Guitar Shorty
- Hollywood Fats Band
- Rod Piazza & The Mighty Flyers
- Nappy Brown
- James "Thunderbird" Davis
- W. C. Clark
- Gary Primich
- Omar & the Howlers
- Lee Rocker's Big Blue
- Lynn August
- Joe "Guitar" Hughes
- Bill Kirchen
- Johnny Dyer
- Rick Holmstrom
- The Cold Cuts
- Ronnie Earl & The Broadcasters
- Bobby Radcliff
- Al Copley
- Grady Gaines
- Ron Levy's Wild Kingdom
- Bobby Parker
- The Neville Brothers
- Earl Gaines
- Robert Ealey
- Big Joe and the Dynaflows
- Carol Fran & Clarence Hollimon
- Robert Ward
- Tommy Ridgley

== See also ==
- List of record labels
