= Briggs Farm Blues Festival =

- Genre: Blues
- Dates: Annually
- Locations: Nescopeck, Pennsylvania, U.S.
- Years active: 1998–present
- Founders: Richard Briggs
- Website: www.briggsfarm.com

Briggs Farm Blues Festival is an annual blues music festival that takes place in Nescopeck, Pennsylvania, in the Northeast Pennsylvania. since the summer of 1998. The festival is hosted every July on the farmland owned by the Briggs family.

Briggs Farm offers concertgoers a weekend of blues, camping, southern-style barbequed food, and an informal atmosphere. In 2014, more than 6,000 people attended the festival.

== History ==
The Briggs Farm Blues Festival was initiated in 1998 by Richard Briggs on a farm which had been in his family since 1768. After working as a TV producer later in life, Richard decided to use his skills to produce a blues festival. Since then the festival has grown and expanded each year, and draws attendees from all over the United States and around the world gathering to hear Delta-style blues.

In 2015 the festival presented mainly blues-rock on the main stage. The Back Porch stage presented a mix of local, regional and national blues musicians.

In 2026, members of the Briggs family, who established and operate the festival, were announced as inductees into the Luzerne County Arts & Entertainment Hall of Fame.

== Camping ==
Many attendees at the Briggs Farm Blues Festival stay in the campground which is set up near the main stage, at the edge of cornfields, or in a wooded area. The campground accommodates RVs, trailers, and tents. Camping allows people to stay throughout the weekend and to meet other blues music enthusiasts.

== Program ==
- 1998 – Big Jack Johnson, BC & The Blues Crew, Frank Grace and the Detonators, Sting Ray's Blues Band, Krypton City Blues Revue
- 1999 – E.C. Scott, Lonnie Shields, Tom Larsen, Melissa Reaves, Little Red Rooster, Frank Grace & The Detonators
- 2000 – Johnny Rawls, Melissa Reaves, Harper, Peter Tork
- 2001 – Eddie Kirkland, Eddie King, Blind Mississippi Morris, B. C. & The Blues Crew, The Midnight Blues
- 2002 – Phil Guy, Osee Anderson, Dave Riley, Deb Callahan, Lonnie Shields, Harper, Sting Ray
- 2003 – Lil’Dave Thompson, Mary Taylor, Tom Larsen, Clarence Spady, Christine Santelli, Magic Red & The VooDoo Tribe
- 2004 – Sonny Rhodes, Joanna Connor, Harper, Clarence Spady, Wolfe, Little Budd
- 2005 – Big Jack Johnson, Terry "Harmonica" Bean, Dave Riley, Kelly Richey, Clarence Spady, Krypton City Blues Revue, Nate Myers & The Aces, Sarah Ayers Band, Magic Red & The VooDoo Tribe
- 2006 – Sam “Bluzman” Taylor, Sharrie Williams, Lightnin’ Malcolm, Collin John Band, Cornlickers, Deb Callahan, Christopher Dean Band
- 2007 – Big Jack Johnson, Alexis P. Suter Band, Harper, Lonnie Shields, “Big T.” Williams, Paul Mark & The Van Dorens, Lefty Williams
- 2008 – Big George Brock, Nora Jean Bruso, Johnny Rawls, Clarence Spady, Bobby Kyle, Colin John & Michael Hill, Kelly Richey, Sarah Ayers Band, Lonnie Shields, Bret Alexander, Mikey Jr., Mark Armstrong
- 2009 – Louisiana Red, Joey Gilmore, Teeny Tucker, Johnny Drummer & The Starliters, Alexis P. Suter, Tom Larsen, Scott Weis Band, BC & Company, Lonnie Shields, Nate Myers, Mitch Ivanoff
- 2010 – Louisiana Red, David "Honeyboy" Edwards, Mississippi Heat, Mac Arnold, John Primer, Moreland & Arbuckle, Clarence Spady, Harper, Deb Callahan, Lonnie Shields, Terry "Harmonica" Bean
- 2011 – Andrew "Jr. Boy" Jones, Eddie Shaw & the Wolf Gang, Teeny Tucker, Alexis P. Suter Band, James Armstrong, Terry "Harmonica" Bean, Jimmy "Duck" Holmes, Lonnie Shields, Eli Cook
- 2012 – Jesse Loewy
