= Boundary Waters Blues Festival =

- Genre: Blues
- Dates: Weekend before Labor Day weekend
- Coordinates: 47°55′52″N 91°48′11″W
- Years active: 2001-present
- Founders: Michael Jankovec and Deb Pettit

Boundary Waters Blues Festival is a blues music festival in St. Louis County, Minnesota, United States. It was established in 2001 by Michael Jankovec—host of a blues radio show in Ely, Minnesota—and Deb Pettit and Doug Brown of Timber Wolf Lodge. Jankovec continues to run the festival, which occurs on the weekend before the Labor Day weekend. The official host of the event is Boundary Waters Radio.

Since its conception the Boundary Waters Blues Festival has showcased over 30 different blues acts, including Little Milton, Bobby Rush, Ronnie Baker Brooks, Reneé Austin, Larry McCray, Ernie Lancaster, Floyd Miles, George "Mojo" Buford, Jimmy D. Lane, Peach, Chris Beard, Kelly Richey, Big Walter Smith, Rita Chiarelli, Fruteland Jackson, Diunna Greenleaf, Rico McFarland, and Johnny Rawls.
