= Bayou Lightning =

Studio album by Lonnie Brooks
- Released: 1979
- Genre: Blues
- Label: Alligator

Lonnie Brooks chronology
| Living Chicago Blues, Vol. 3 (1978) | Bayou Lightning (1979) | Turn On the Night (1981) |

Bayou Lightning is an album by the American musician Lonnie Brooks, released in 1979. It is considered to be his commercial breakthrough. The album won the Grand Prix du Disque Award in 1980. Brooks supported it with a North American tour. His son Ronnie Baker Brooks recreated the album cover art for his 2025 album, Blues in My DNA.

== Production ==
Brooks was influenced primarily by B. B. King. He dubbed his music "voodoo blues", due to its combination of Louisiana and Chicago influences. Casey Jones played drums during the recording sessions. Billy Branch played harmonica on "Alimony". "In the Dark" is a cover of the Junior Parker song. "I Ain't Superstitious" was written by Willie Dixon. "Figure Head" is about a money-hungry woman. The protagonist of "Voodoo Daddy" fears that his future father-in-law may put a hex on him.

== Critical reception ==
Professional ratings
Review scores
| Source | Rating |
|---|---|
| All Music Guide to the Blues | 5/5 stars |
| Robert Christgau | B− |
| DownBeat | 4.5/5 stars |
| The Encyclopedia of Popular Music | 3/5 stars |
| The Grove Press Guide to the Blues on CD | 4/5 stars |
| MusicHound Blues: The Essential Album Guide | 3/5 stars |
| The Penguin Guide to Blues Recordings | 3/4 stars |
| The Rolling Stone Jazz & Blues Album Guide | 3.5/5 stars |

The Bay State Banner said that "Brooks plays a fluid, sharp guitar, influenced by the sound of fellow Louisianans like Slim Harpo, [and] is also capable of working in the harsh, chomping urban genre." The Lincoln Journal Star called the album "an outstanding effort by a versatile blues performer." The Houston Post noted that "it's easy enough to hear his bayou roots, but there's also a hard dose of Chicago-style energy and fire here". The Herald-Times concluded that "what sets Brooks apart from most of the other bluesmen is his jazzy toying with tempo." Robert Christgau labeled Brooks "a thoughtful guitarist, intermittently clever composer, and competent shouter".

In 1991, the Chicago Tribune listed Bayou Lightning among ten "essential" Alligator Records albums.

== Track listing ==
Side A

1. "Voodoo Daddy"
2. "Figure Head"
3. "Watchdog"
4. "Breakfast in Bed"
5. "In the Dark"

Side B

1. "Worked Up Woman"
2. "Alimony"
3. "Watch What You Got"
4. "I Ain't Superstitious"
5. "You Know What My Body Needs"
