= King Biscuit =

King Biscuit may refer to:

- King Biscuit Blues Festival, an annual, multi-day blues festival, held in Helena, Arkansas, United States
  - Arkansas Blues and Heritage Festival, the name of the festival from 2005 to 2010
- King Biscuit Boy or Richard Alfred Newell (1944–2003), Canadian blues musician
- King Biscuit Flower Hour, a rock and roll radio show by King Biscuit Entertainment
- King Biscuit Time, a blues radio show broadcast from Helena, Arkansas on KFFA
- King Biscuit Time (musician), a solo project by Scottish musician Steve Mason
