= Lonnie Brooks =

American blues singer and guitarist (1933–2017)

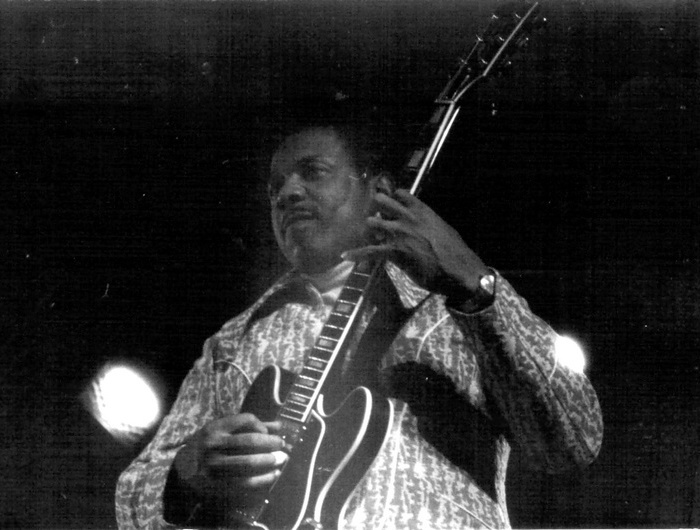
- Lonnie Brooks, in France, December 1975

Background information
- Born: Lee Baker, Jr. December 18, 1933; Dubuisson, St. Landry Parish, Louisiana, U.S.
- Died: April 1, 2017 (aged 83) Chicago, Illinois
- Genres: Chicago blues, electric blues
- Occupations: Musician, singer
- Instruments: Vocals, electric guitar
- Years active: 1953–2017
- Labels: Alligator, Delmark, Evidence, Goldband, Capitol, Black & Blue, Black Top

Lonnie Brooks (born Lee Baker Jr., December 18, 1933 – April 1, 2017) was an American blues singer and guitarist. The musicologist Robert Palmer, writing in Rolling Stone, stated, "His music is witty, soulful and ferociously energetic, brimming with novel harmonic turnarounds, committed vocals and simply astonishing guitar work." Jon Pareles, a music critic for the New York Times, wrote, "He sings in a rowdy baritone, sliding and rasping in songs that celebrate lust, fulfilled and unfulfilled; his guitar solos are pointed and unhurried, with a tone that slices cleanly across the beat. Wearing a cowboy hat, he looks like the embodiment of a good-time bluesman." Howard Reich, a music critic for the Chicago Tribune, wrote, "...the music that thundered from Brooks' instrument and voice...shook the room. His sound was so huge and delivery so ferocious as to make everything alongside him seem a little smaller."

== Career ==
Brooks was born in Dubuisson, St. Landry Parish, Louisiana. He learned to play blues from his banjo-picking grandfather but did not think about a career in music until he moved to Port Arthur, Texas, in the early 1950s. There he heard live performances by Clarence "Gatemouth" Brown, T-Bone Walker, B.B. King, Long John Hunter and others and began to think about making money from music. Clifton Chenier heard Brooks strumming his guitar on his front porch in Port Arthur and offered him a job in his touring band.

Embarking on a solo career, he began calling himself Guitar Jr. and signed with the Goldband label, based in Lake Charles, Louisiana. His singles for the label included the regional hit "Family Rules", which remains a favorite of the swamp pop idiom in southern Louisiana and southeast Texas. Other Goldband singles included "Made in the Shade" and "The Crawl" (both of which were later recorded by the Fabulous Thunderbirds).

In 1960, he moved to Chicago, Illinois, where he adopted the stage name Lonnie Brooks (Luther "Guitar Junior" Johnson was already using the name Guitar Junior there). Brooks found regular work in clubs on the West Side of Chicago, in nearby Gary and East Chicago, Indiana, and occasionally in the Rush Street entertainment area on Chicago's North Side. He recorded numerous singles for various labels, including Chess, Chirrup, Mercury, Midas and USA Records, receiving some local radio airplay. He also supported other artists on record and in live performances, including Jimmy Reed. In 1961, he played guitar on the double album Jimmy Reed at Carnegie Hall.

In 1969, he recorded his first album, Broke an’ Hungry, for Capitol Records. It was produced by Wayne Shuler, son of Eddie Shuler, who had founded Goldband Records in Louisiana.

In 1974, Brooks participated in a multi-artist tour of Europe and recorded an album, Sweet Home Chicago, for the French label Black & Blue. When he returned to Chicago, he began playing regularly at Pepper’s Hideout on the South Side. There he attracted the attention of Bruce Iglauer, the head of the fledgling Alligator Records, who had previously seen him at the Avenue Lounge on the city’s West Side.

In 1978, Iglauer included four of Brooks’s songs (including three originals) in the anthology series Living Chicago Blues, released by Alligator. Brooks signed a contract with the label, which released his album Bayou Lightning the following year. The album won the Grand Prix du Disque Award from the 1980 Montreux Jazz Festival. While in Montreux, Brooks befriended the country music star Roy Clark, who arranged for him to appear on the country music television program Hee Haw.

After that time, Brooks recorded exclusively for Alligator, releasing seven albums in his own name and contributing to shared recordings and compilation appearances. His style, sometimes described as "voodoo blues", included elements of Chicago blues, Louisiana blues, swamp pop and rhythm and blues. Other labels issued pre-1978 recordings by Brooks and compilations of his singles.

Following the release of Bayou Lightning, Brooks began touring in the U.S. and also returned to Europe. A 1982 trip to Germany resulted in an hour-long live performance on German television. His next album, Hot Shot, was released in 1983. His album Wound Up Tight, released in 1986, featured his most famous fan, Johnny Winter, on guitar. Rolling Stone took notice of the album, running a six-page feature on Brooks. In 1987, BBC Radio broadcast an hour-long live performance by him. By this time, his teenage son Ronnie Baker Brooks was touring with the band. He made his recording debut on his father's album Live from Chicago—Bayou Lightning Strikes.

Brooks’s 1991 release, Satisfaction Guaranteed, received much coverage in the press, including features and articles in the Washington Post, the Village Voice, the Chicago Tribune, the Los Angeles Times, Guitar World, Living Blues, Blues Revue, and other publications.

Brooks went on a national concert tour with B.B. King, Buddy Guy, Koko Taylor, Junior Wells and Eric Johnson in the summer of 1993. Eric Clapton, performing in Chicago as part of his "From the Cradle" tour, honored Brooks by inviting the bluesman on stage for an impromptu jam at the blues club Buddy Guy's Legends.

In 1996, Brooks released Roadhouse Rules. The album was produced in Memphis by Jim Gaines, who also produced recordings by Luther Allison, Stevie Ray Vaughan and Santana. Ronnie Baker Brooks also played on this album. With fellow Gulf Coast blues veterans Long John Hunter and Phillip Walker (both of whom he had known and played with in the 1950s in Port Arthur), Brooks released Lone Star Shootout in 1999.

Brooks continued to tour in the United States and Europe. His sons, Ronnie Baker Brooks and Wayne Baker Brooks, are also full-time blues musicians, fronting their own bands and touring extensively in the United States and abroad. Wayne Baker Brooks also played in his father's band. The Brookses are frequent guest performers at each other's shows and have booked appearances as the Brooks Family.

Besides his live and recorded performances, Brooks appeared in the films Blues Brothers 2000 and The Express: The Ernie Davis Story and in two UK television commercials for Heineken beer. His song "Eyeballin'" was used in the film Forever LuLu. "Got Lucky Last Night", featuring Johnny Winter, was used in the film Masters of Menace.

Brooks was an influence on the soul artist Reggie Sears.

== Death ==
Brooks died in Chicago, Illinois, United States, on April 1, 2017, at the age of 83.

== Author ==
Brooks co-authored the 1998 book Blues for Dummies, with Wayne Baker Brooks and the music historian, guitarist, and songwriter Cub Koda. As of 2018, it is still in print.

== Discography ==
- Broke an' Hungry, as Guitar Jr. (Capitol, 1969)
- Sweet Home Chicago (Black & Blue, 1975; reissued by Evidence, 1994)
- Living Chicago Blues, Vol. 3 (Alligator, 1978)
- Bayou Lightning (Alligator, 1979)
- Blues Deluxe (Alligator/WXRT, 1980)
- Turn On the Night (Alligator, 1981)
- Hot Shot (Alligator, 1983)
- The Crawl, as Guitar Jr. (Goldband singles collected/reissued by Charly, 1984)
- Live at Pepper’s 1968 (Black Magic, 1985; reissued by Black Top, 1996)
- Wound Up Tight (Alligator, 1986)
- Live from Chicago: Bayou Lightning Strikes (Alligator, 1988)
- Satisfaction Guaranteed (Alligator, 1991)
- Let’s Talk It Over (1977 sessions released by Delmark, 1993)
- Roadhouse Rules (Alligator, 1996)
- Deluxe Edition (Alligator, 1997) compilation
- Lone Star Shootout, with Long John Hunter and Phillip Walker (Alligator, 1999)

== See also ==
- Blues Hall of Fame
- List of blues musicians
- Excello Records
- Long Beach Blues Festival
- San Francisco Blues Festival
- Chicago Blues Festival
- The Express: The Ernie Davis Story, "The Ernie Davie Story" as "Lonnie Brooks"
- Blues Brothers 2000 as himself "Lonnie Brooks"
- Hee Haw TV show as himself "Lonnie Brooks"
- Soul Train as himself "Lonnie Brooks" performing song "The Flip"
