= Nora Jean Bruso =

American singer

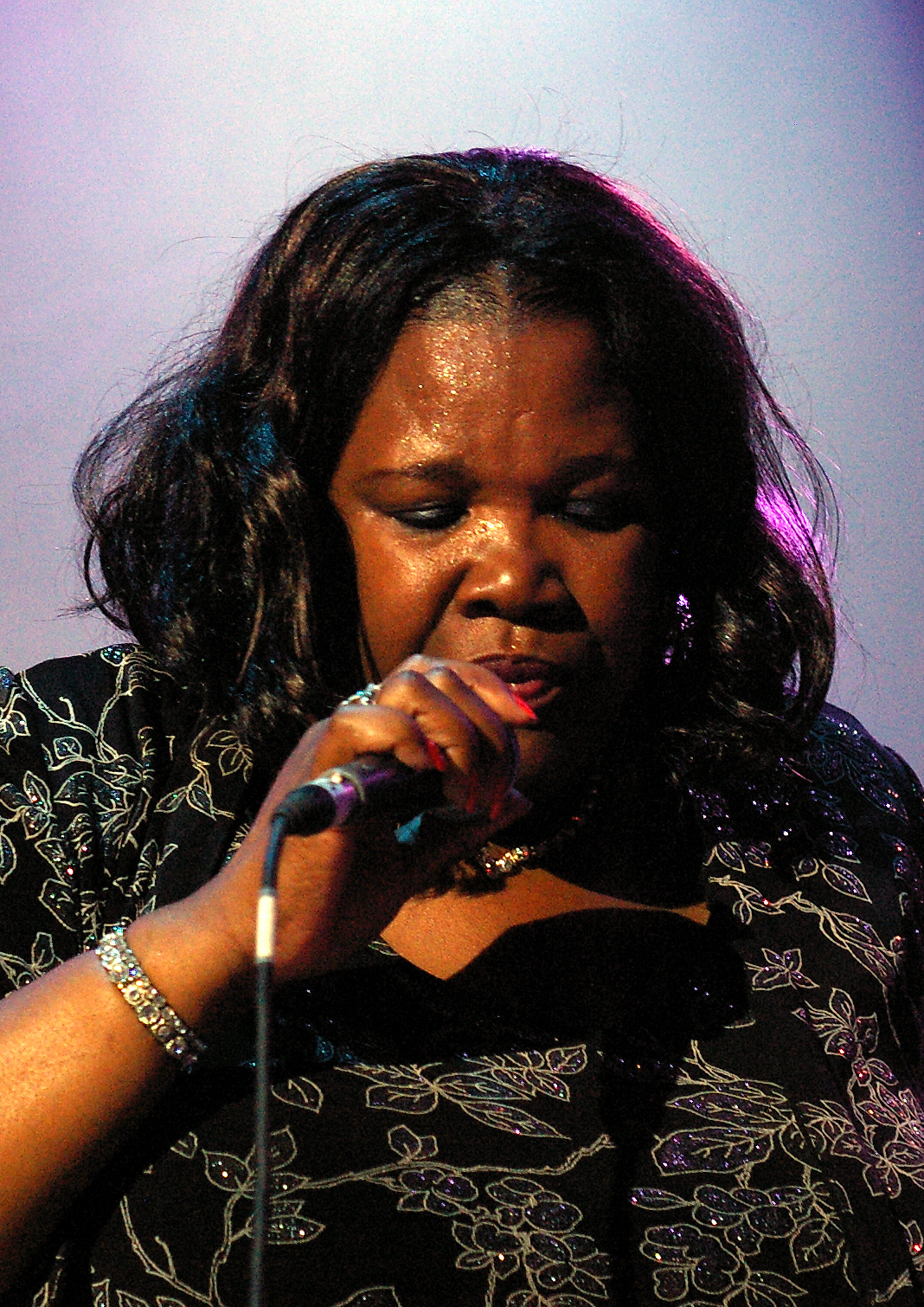
- Nora Jean Bruso, in 2010

Background information
- Also known as: Nora Jean Wallace; Nora Jean
- Born: Elnora Jean Wallace; June 21, 1956 (age 70); Greenwood, Mississippi, United States
- Genres: Chicago blues, electric blues
- Occupations: Singer, songwriter
- Years active: 1970s–present
- Labels: Red Hurricane Records, Severn Records

Nora Jean Wallace (formerly Bruso) (born June 21, 1956) is an American Chicago and electric blues singer and songwriter. She has penned over 700 songs, and worked with Carl Weathersby and Dave Specter.

Fellow blues singer, Koko Taylor once commented, "Nora Jean sounds just like I did when I was her age. She is one of the new upcoming women that's singing the real blues. I know she is going to make it." Bruso was named one of the ten great women in Chicago blues by Chicago's Museum of Science and Industry. She has been nominated various times for a Blues Music Award.

== Life and career ==
Elnora Jean Wallace was born in Greenwood, Leflore County, Mississippi, United States, to a musical family, the seventh of 16 children of a Mississippi sharecropper.

Nora won the West Tallahatchie High School Talent Show for singing, and began to perform in other schools in her local area. In 1976, she relocated to Chicago, Illinois when she was 19 years old, and began singing with a group called Scottie and the Oasis. In 1982, Scottie died but she continued performing with other ensembles and three years later joined Jimmy Dawkins' band. Bruso recorded her debut single, "Untrue Lover" on Dawkins' own Leric label. In 1985, she contributed vocals on one track of Dawkin's Feel the Blues release, billed as Nora Jean Wallace. Dawkins band, including Bruso, appeared at the Chicago Blues Festival in 1989. Bruso also participated on Kant Sheck Dees Bluze (1991), another Dawkins release, this time on Earwig Records.

In 1992, she left the music industry to raise her two sons, but almost a decade later was tempted back into a recording studio following the promptings of Billy Flynn, another member of Dawkins' backing band. Bruso supplied four vocal tracks for Blues and Love (2002) and, the same year, appeared as a backing singer with Dawkins again at the Chicago Blues Festival. She met and married Mark Bruso in 2002. Later that year she recorded Nora Jean Bruso Sings the Blues, which was released in 2003 by Red Hurricane Records. Bruso performed again at the 2003 Chicago Blues Festival, this time under her own name, and toured in Europe.

In 2004, she was nominated for two W.C. Handy Awards (now known as Blues Music Awards), as 'Best New Artist' and 'Best Traditional Female Artist'. The same year, after having signed a recording contract with Severn Records, she released Going Back to Mississippi. This was more of a commercial success reaching number five on Living Blues radio chart and number one on XM satellite radio. In June 2004, she returned and performed on the main stage at the Chicago Blues Festival with her own band. Her ensemble at that time included Carl Weathersby (guitar), Bruce Beglin (bass) and Brian Lupo (guitar). These musicians, among others, played on Going Back to Mississippi.

Her live appearances continued and included the King Biscuit Blues Festival, Rawa Blues Festival, Notodden Blues Festival (2005), Briggs Farm Blues Festival (2008), Cape May Jazz Festival and Pocono Blues Festival. She appeared again at the Chicago Blues Festival in 2011. In 2011, the Chicago Sun-Times noted that her collaboration with Little Bobby for the latter's album, Good Blues, "... helped push Nora Jean to her seventh Blues Music Award nomination for 'Best Traditional Female Blues Performer'."

In June 2014, she appeared with Lurrie Bell's Chicago Blues Band in Pyla-sur-Mer, France. In July 2015, she performed at the Kingston Mines club in Chicago.

Bruso is currently based in La Porte, Indiana. In 2020, she released her latest album, Blues Woman.

== Discography ==
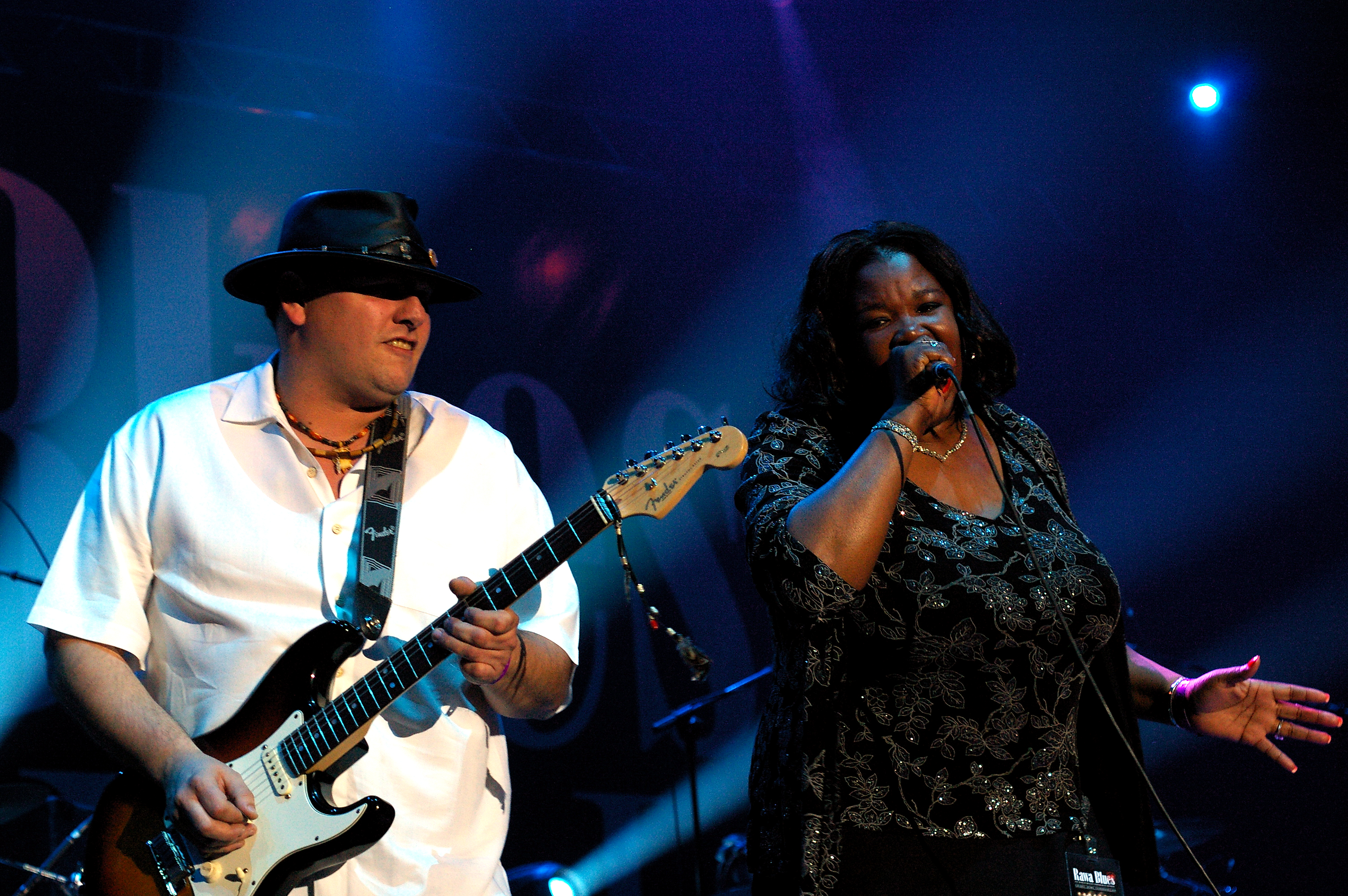

=== Solo albums ===
Year	Title	Record label
2003	Nora Jean Bruso Sings the Blues	Red Hurricane Records
2004	Going Back to Mississippi	Severn Records
2020	Blues Woman	Severn Records
