= Sarasota Blues Fest =

Music festival in Sarasota, Florida

The Sarasota Blues Fest was an annual music festival held at Ed Smith Stadium in Sarasota, Florida. In addition to all day live entertainment, the festival has vendors selling a wide array of food, drink and crafts.

== History ==
The Sarasota Blues Fest was started in 1991 by the Sarasota Blues Society. They went bankrupt in 1992. Concert producer Barbara Strauss took over the Sarasota Blues Fest in 1993. The festival is now incorporated by Strauss's company, Sovereign Ventures, Inc. The festival was originally held at the Sarasota County Fairgrounds but moved to Ed Smith Stadium Complex in 2006. In 2011 The Sarasota Blues Fest and all rights to the name and property was purchased by ExtremeTix Inc., a Houston-based Ticketing Solutions and Event Services company.

== Charity ==
Partial proceeds from the event go to a charity. Past recipients of donations have included United Cerebral Palsy, Police Athletic League Sailor Circus Capital Campaign, United Way, Florida Center for Child and Family Development & All Faiths Food Bank.

== Past performers ==
- 1993 - Pinetop Perkins, James Cotton, Derek Trucks, Chris Anderson
- 1994 - Gregg Allman & Friends, Junior Wells, Michael Farris, Twinkle, Lil' Ed & The Blues Emperials
- 1995 - Buddy Guy, Chris Duarte, Sandra Hall, Josh Smith
- 1996 - Dr. John, Tab Benoit, Lady Bianca, Lucky Peterson, Floyd Miles, Sean Chambers
- 1997 - The Fabulous Thunderbirds, Bobby "Blue" Bland, Tinsley Ellis, Bill Wharton "The Sauce Boss"
- 1998 - Jimmie Vaughan, Gregg Allman, Derek Trucks, Bernard Allison, Mary Cutrofello
- 1999 - Booker T & the MG's, Deborah Coleman, Henry "Son" Seals, Bryan Lee, Steven Seagal w/Dickey Betts & Lee Sklyr
- 2000 - Gregg Allman & Friends, Lonnie Brooks, E.C. Scott, Walter Trout & The Free Radicals
- 2001 - Delbert McClinton, Clarence "Gatemouth" Brown, Hubert Sumlin, Liz Manville Greeson, Walter Smith
- 2002 - Jeff Healey Band, Little Milton, Eric Sardinas, Kelly Richie Band, Gibbs Brothers
- 2003 - Solomon Burke, John Mayall & the Bluesbreakers, Coco Montoya, Eric Steckel Band, Delta Moon
- 2004 - Ike Turner & Kings of Rhythm, Radiators, Larry McCray, Nick Curran & The Nitelifes, Robin Thrush
- 2005 - Delbert McClinton, Shemekia Copeland, Sonny Landreth, The Lee Boys, Reggie Sears
- 2006 - Gregg Allman, Magic Slim and the Teardrops, Maria Muldaur, Devon Allman, Jamie Eubanks
- 2007 - Buddy Guy, Oteil and the Peacemakers, Zac Harmon, Mighty Lester, Conrad Oberg
- 2008 - Bobby Rush, Bob Margolin & Diunna Greenleaf, JJ Grey & MOFRO, Jason Ricci, Wyatt Garey
- 2009 - Little Feat, Duke Robillard, Larry McCray, Bruce Katz, Floyd Miles, Mojo Myles, Fogts Junior Allstars
- 2010 - Elvin Bishop Band, Trombone Shorty & Orleans Avenue, Tommy Castro, Moreland & Arbuckle, Jake Haldenwang
- 2011 - Los Lobos Band, Ryan Shaw, Shaun Murphy, Lightnin' Malcolm, Selwyn Birchwood Band, Mike Imbasciani with special guest Alex Shaw
- 2012 - Delbert McClinton, Ana Popović, Curtis Salgado, Paul Thorn, Royal Southern Brotherhood, Pett Crow.
