= There Comes a Time =

There Comes a Time may refer to:

- There Comes a Time (album), a 1976 album by Gil Evans
- There Comes a Time, a 1980 album by Tommy Snyder
- "There Comes a Time", a 1959 song by Jack Scott from What Am I Living For, later covered by The Kestrels
- "There Comes a Time", a 1965 song by Eartha Kitt
- "There Comes a Time", a 1973 song by Daliah Lavi from Let The Love Grow
- "There Comes a Time", a 1997 song by Luther Allison from Reckless
- "There Comes a Time", a 2004 song by Marc Moulin from Entertainment
- "There Comes a Time", a 2008 song by Celine Dion from My Love: Essential Collection
- "There Comes a Time", a 2011 song by Graham Colton from Pacific Coast Eyes
- "There Comes a Time", a 2015 song by The Honeydrips from In The City
- "There Comes a Time (Back to Life)", a 2017 song by Mono Inc. from Together Till the End
