= Luther Allison =

American blues guitarist (1939–1997)

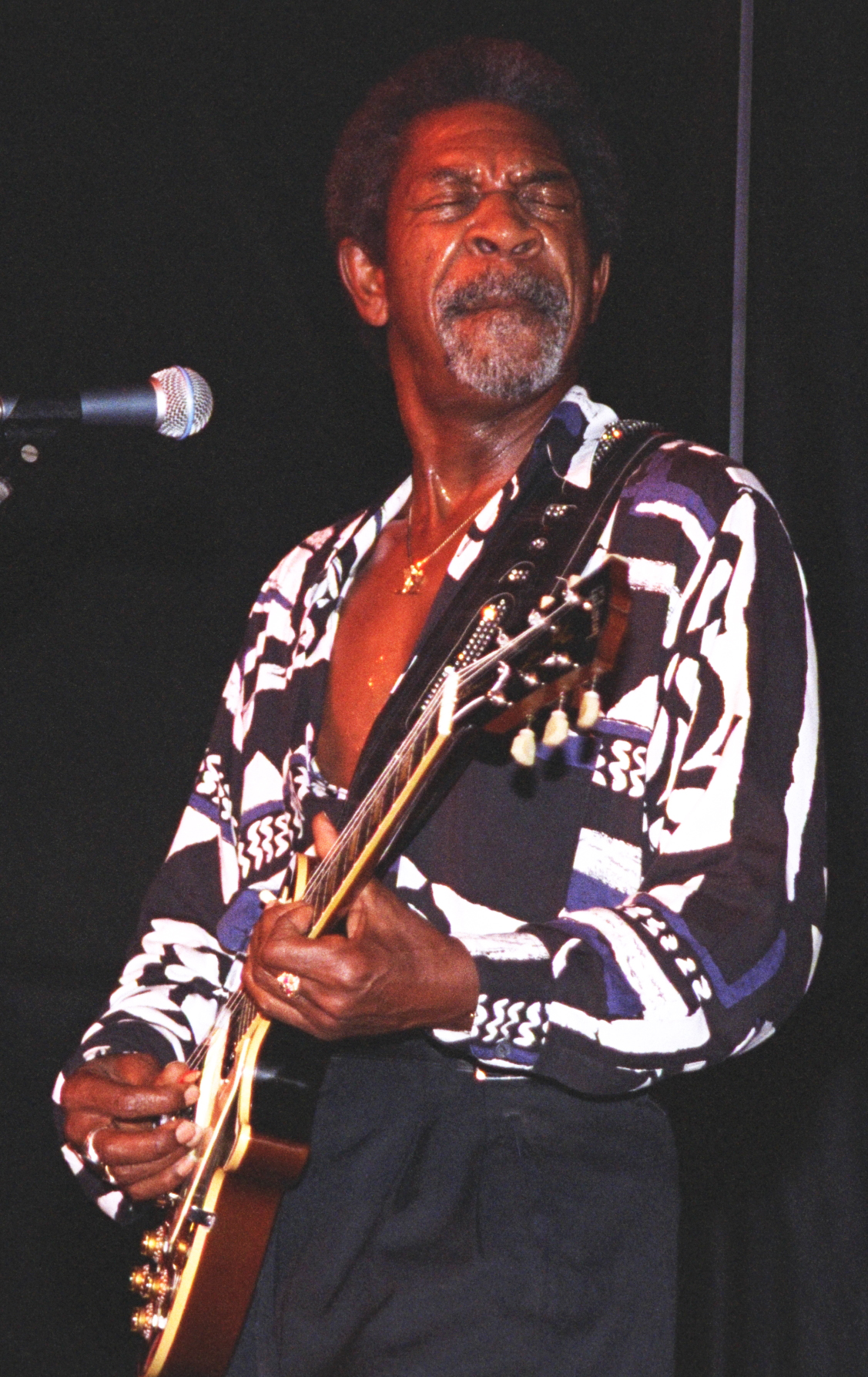
- Allison in 1996

Background information
- Born: Luther Sylvester Allison; August 17, 1939; Widener, Arkansas, U.S.
- Died: August 12, 1997 (aged 57) Madison, Wisconsin, U.S.
- Genres: Blues; Chicago blues; electric blues
- Occupation: Musician
- Instruments: Vocals; guitar
- Years active: 1957–1997
- Labels: Delmark; Motown; Ruf; Alligator; Rumble; Blind Pig

Luther Sylvester Allison (August 17, 1939 – August 12, 1997) was an American blues singer-songwriter and guitarist. He was born in Widener, Arkansas, although some accounts suggest his actual place of birth was Mayflower, Arkansas. Allison was interested in music as a child and during the late 1940s he toured in a family gospel group called The Southern Travellers. He moved with his family to Chicago in 1951 and attended Farragut High School where he was classmates with Muddy Waters' son. He taught himself guitar and began listening to blues extensively. Three years later he dropped out of school and began hanging around outside blues nightclubs with the hopes of being invited to perform. Allison played with the bands of Howlin' Wolf and Freddie King, taking over King's band when King toured nationally. He worked with Jimmy Dawkins, Magic Sam and Otis Rush, and also backed James Cotton. Chicago Reader has called him "the Jimi Hendrix of blues guitar".

== Biography ==
=== Early life ===
Luther Sylvester Allison was born on August 18, 1939, in Widener, Arkansas, the fourteenth of 15 children. His family moved to Chicago when he was 12, in search of better opportunities. Several of Allison's siblings sang in a gospel group called the Southern Travellers. One of his older brothers, Ollie, soon began working as a guitarist on Chicago's booming South Side blues scene. Seeking to emulate his brother, Luther took up the guitar himself. By the middle of his teens, Allison was good enough to sit in with his brother's band on club dates.

=== Career ===
From 1954, Allison jammed with his brother's band, the Ollie Lee Allison Band. By 1957, he had formed a band with Ollie and another brother, Grant Allison, initially called The Rolling Stones, later changed to The Four Jivers, and they performed at clubs in Chicago.

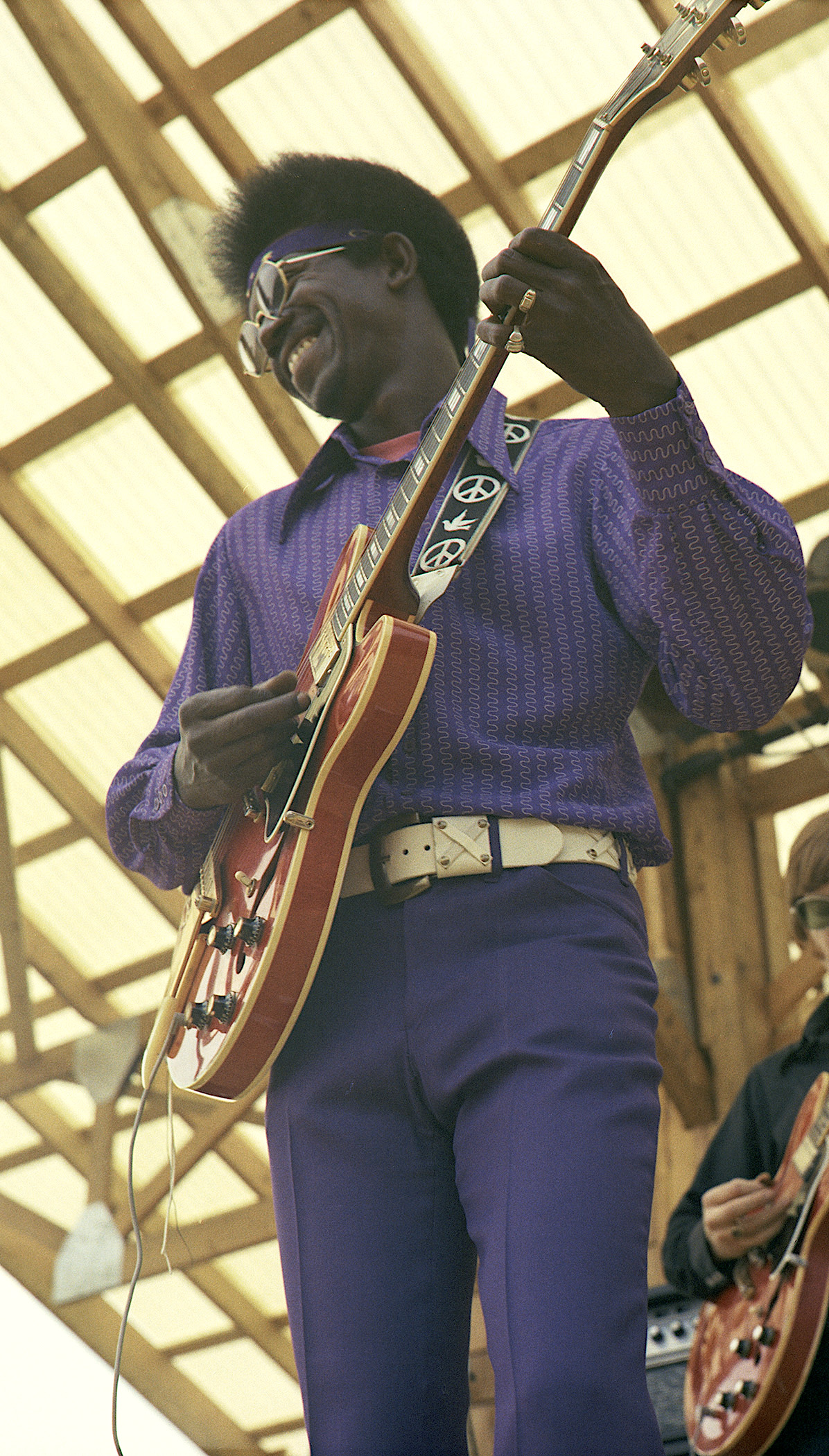
Luther Allison at the 1970 Ann Arbor Blues Festival.

Allison's big break came in 1957, when Howlin' Wolf invited him to the stage. The same year he worked briefly with Jimmy Dawkins, playing in local clubs. Freddie King took Allison under his wing, and after King got a record deal, Allison took over his gig in the house band of a club on Chicago's West Side. He worked the club circuit in the late 1950s and early 1960s. During this period, Allison moved to California for a year where he worked with Shakey Jake Harris and Sunnyland Slim. He recorded his first single in 1965. He signed a recording contract with Delmark Records in 1967 and released his debut album, Love Me Mama, the following year. He performed a well-received set at the 1969 Ann Arbor Blues Festival and as a result was asked to perform there in each of the next three years. He toured nationwide. In 1972, he signed with Motown Records, becoming one of the label's very few blues artists. In the mid-1970s he toured Europe. He moved to France in 1977.

Allison was known for his powerful concert performances, lengthy soulful guitar solos and crowd walking with his Gibson Les Paul. He lived briefly during this period in Peoria, Illinois, where he signed with Rumble Records, releasing two live recordings, Gonna Be a Live One in Here Tonight!, produced by Bill Knight, and Power Wire Blues, produced by George Faber and Jeffrey P. Hess. Allison played the bar circuit in the United States during this period and spent eight months of the year in Europe at high-profile venues, including the Montreux Jazz Festival. In 1992, he performed with the French rock and roll star Johnny Hallyday in 18 shows in Paris, also playing during the intermission.

Allison's manager and European agent, Thomas Ruf, founded Ruf Records in 1994. Signing with Ruf Records, Allison launched a comeback in association with Alligator Records. Alligator founder Bruce Iglauer convinced Allison to return to the United States. The album Soul Fixin' Man was recorded and released in 1994, and Allison toured the United States and Canada. He won four W. C. Handy Awards in 1994. With the James Solberg Band backing him, nonstop touring and the release of Blue Streak (featuring the song "Cherry Red Wine"), Allison earned more Handy Awards and gained wider recognition. He won several Living Blues Awards and was featured on the covers of blues publications.

=== Illness and death ===
During his tour in the summer of 1997, Allison checked into a hospital on July 10, 1997 for dizziness and loss of coordination. It was discovered that he had a tumor on his lung that had metastasized to his brain. He began radiation therapy on July 16, which lasted until August 1. In and out of a coma, Allison died on August 12, 1997, five days before his 58th birthday, in Madison, Wisconsin. His final album, Reckless, had was released just five months prior.

His son Bernard Allison, at one time a member of his band, is now a solo recording artist. Bernard, the youngest of nine siblings, was exposed to all kinds of music by his father. The younger Allison made his first venture into the music business at age 13, when he performed on a live album with his father.

Allison was posthumously inducted into the Blues Hall of Fame in 1998. In 2000, the Chicago Sun-Times called him "the Bruce Springsteen of the blues". He was a strong influence on many young blues guitarists, such as Chris Beard and Reggie Sears.

Allison is buried at Washington Memory Gardens Cemetery in Homewood, Illinois.

== Discography ==
=== Studio and live albums ===
Year	Title	Label	Number	Notes
1969	Love Me Mama	Delmark	625	
1972	Bad News Is Coming	Motown/Gordy	964	
1974	Luther's Blues	Motown/Gordy	967	
1976	Night Life	Motown/Gordy	974	
1977	Love Me Papa	Black & Blue	33.524	Reissued as Estudio Eldorado 524 (Brazil) and Evidence CD 26015 (U.S.)
1979	Gonna Be a Live One in Here Tonight!	Rumble	1001	Recorded live in Peoria, Illinois, on April 18–19, 1979; reissued as South Side Safari, Red Lightnin' 0036
1979	Power Wire Blues	Rumble	1004	Part 2 of the Peoria concert; reissued 1985 as Charly 1105
1979	Live in Paris	Paris Album/Buda	2-28501	Recorded in Paris, La Chapelle Des Lombards, 1979; also issued as Ruf 1354, Free Bird 209/FLY06, Pläne 88295, Platinum 161354
1979	Live	Blue Silver	3001/3321	Part 2 of the 1979 Paris concert; also on Blue Sky/Buda
1980	Time	Paris Album/Buda	2-28505	
1984	Let's Have a Natural Ball	JSP	1077	
1984	Life Is a Bitch	Encore!/Melodie	131	Blind Pig 2287 (1987) in the U.S., retitled Serious
1985	Here I Come	Encore!/Melodie	133	
1987	Rich Man	Ruf	8001	Also RFR 1005, Charly CRB 1227, Orbis BLU NC 044 (plus 3 bonus tracks)
1991	More from Berlin	East West	LACD 1991-2	Live, 1989
1992	Hand Me Down My Moonshine	Inak/Ruf	1047	Acoustic
1992	Bercy 92 (Johnny Hallyday)	Philips	514 400	Electric guitar on one title; recorded live at the Palais Omnisports de Paris-Bercy
1994	Soul Fixin' Man	Alligator	4820	Ruf 1021 in Europe, retitled Bad Love
1995	Blue Streak	Alligator	4834	Ruf 7712 in Europe
1996	Live ’89: Let's Try It Again	Ruf	1028	Recorded in Berlin, May 1989
1996	Live in Montreux: Where Have You Been?	Ruf	1008	Recorded 1976–1994
1997	Reckless	Alligator	4849	Ruf 1012 in Europe
1999	Live in Chicago	Alligator	4869	Ruf 1042 in Europe, recorded 1995–1997, 2-disc set
1999	Standing at the Crossroad	Black & Blue	421.1	Recorded 1977 in Paris; also Night & Day 210, Blues Reference
2002	Pay It Forward	Ruf	1060	Recorded 1984–1994
2007	Underground	Ruf	1132	Recorded c. 1958
2009	Songs from the Road	Ruf	1157	CD and DVD recorded in Montreal, 1997

=== Compilations ===
Year	Title	Label	Number	Notes
1995	Sweet Home Chicago	Charly	BM-37	
1996	The Motown Years, 1972–1976	Motown/Universal		

=== Video ===
Year	Title	Label	Number	Notes
1998	Live in Paradise	Ruf	VHS	Recorded on La Reunion Island, April 1997; also released on DVD (2001)
2009	Songs from the Road	Ruf	1157	CD and DVD recorded in Montreal, 1997

== See also ==
- List of blues musicians
- List of Chicago blues musicians
- List of electric blues musicians
- List of guitarists by genre
- List of notable brain tumor patients
