= Diunna Greenleaf =

American blues singer and songwriter (born 1957)

- Born: Diunna Fay Greenleaf; October 6, 1957 (age 69); Houston, Texas, United States
- Genre: Texas blues
- Occupations: Singer, songwriter
- Instrument: Vocals
- Years active: Late 1990s-present
- Labels: Little Village Foundation, CD Baby
- Website: diunna.com

Diunna Greenleaf (born October 6, 1957) is an American blues singer and songwriter.

At the 2014 Blues Music Awards, Greenleaf won the Koko Taylor Award (Traditional Blues Female), beating fellow nominees Teeny Tucker, Lavelle White, Trudy Lynn, and Zora Young.

== Life and career ==
Diunna Fay Greenleaf was born in Houston, Texas, United States. Her parents, Ben and Mary Ella Greenleaf (née Travis), were religiously devout and involved in gospel music. Her early musical influences included Sam Cooke, Sister Rosetta Tharpe, Koko Taylor, and Aretha Franklin. Before her musical career, Greenleaf obtained a degree in Mass Communications at the Prairie View A&M University.

Greenleaf and her backing band, Blue Mercy, have performed on the international stage for a number of years. In 2005, they took part and triumphed at the International Blues Challenge in Memphis, Tennessee.

She was President of the Houston Blues Society for three years, becoming the first woman to undertake that role. Greenleaf initiated the now annual Houston Blues Society Founders Day, and continues to support the Blues in Schools Program. She was also one of the founders of the Friends of Blues Montgomery County.

She performed as a backing vocalist for Pinetop Perkins, on his segment of the Grammy Award winning album, Last of the Great Mississippi Delta Bluesmen: Live in Dallas (2007). The same year Greenleaf and Blue Mercy issued their debut studio album, Cotton Field to Coffee House.

In 2008 at the Blues Music Awards, Greenleaf won the 'Best New Artist Debut' award for Cotton Field to Coffee House. At the same ceremony the following year, she was nominated for the 'Koko Taylor Award (Traditional Blues Female)'. In 2012, Greenleaf was nominated again for the 'Koko Taylor Award', and in the 'Traditional Blues Album' category for Trying to Hold On. The album included fourteen songs, of which Greenleaf wrote ten and co-wrote another. The album was recorded in Tempe, Arizona.

Kenny "Blues Boss" Wayne's Rollin' with the Blues Boss (2014), included guest vocal contributions from Greenleaf and Eric Bibb. Greenleaf also appeared as a guest singer on Japanese jump blues band Bloodest Saxophone's Texas Queens 5 released by Dialtone Records in 2019.

== Festivals ==
Greenleaf has performed at many music festivals. These include the Blues to Bop Festival in Lugano, Switzerland, the Montreal International Jazz Festival (2009), the Bern Jazz Festival, the Arkansas Blues and Heritage Festival (2007), Boundary Waters Blues Festival, Sarasota Blues Fest (2008), Notodden Blues Festival (2008), Long Beach Blues Festival (2009), the DC Blues Festival (2010), the Tinner Hill Blues Festival (2012), the Bikes Blues and BBQ (2014), and the Houston Blues and Jazz Festival (2022).

== Discography ==
=== Albums ===
Year	Title	Record label	Credits
2004	Crazy But Live in Houston	CD Baby	Diunna Greenleaf and Blue Mercy
2007	Cotton Field to Coffee House	CD Baby	Diunna Greenleaf and Blue Mercy
2011	Trying to Hold On	CD Baby	Diunna Greenleaf
2022	I Ain't Playin'	Little Village Foundation	Diunna Greenleaf

== See also ==
- List of Texas blues musicians
- List of blues musicians
