= Childe Harold (bar) =

Washington D. C. saloon

Coordinates: 38.91163°N 77.04512°W

Childe Harold was a saloon and entertainment venue located in Washington, D.C.'s Dupont Circle. It was first opened by Bill Heard Jr. in 1967 and began hosting live music during the 1970s, becoming one of the first nightspot places in Dupont Circle.

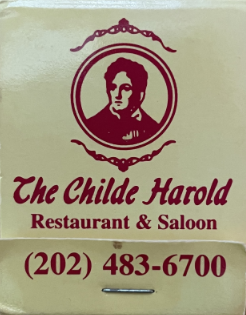
Matchbook from The Childe Harold restaurant, circa 1970s

The Childe Harold was named after the poem Childe Harold's Pilgrimage by Lord Byron. It featured a basement and main level, where the music was performed. It is known to have hosted The Ramones, Al Jarreau, Son Seals, Larry Coryell, Bonnie Raitt, Emmylou Harris, Root Boy Slim, and Bruce Springsteen. Springsteen's 1973 contract, detailing his time spent at Childe Harold, was hung on the wall of the venue, displaying that he was paid $750 for three nights of performances. In 1981 the venue ended live music performances, citing the increasing cost of musical acts, and the upstairs became an upscale restaurant. The venue was known for a diverse crowd "from jocks to hippies". Childe Harold was forced to close in 2007 after leasing agreements could not be reached.
