= Teeny Tucker =

American singer (born 1958)

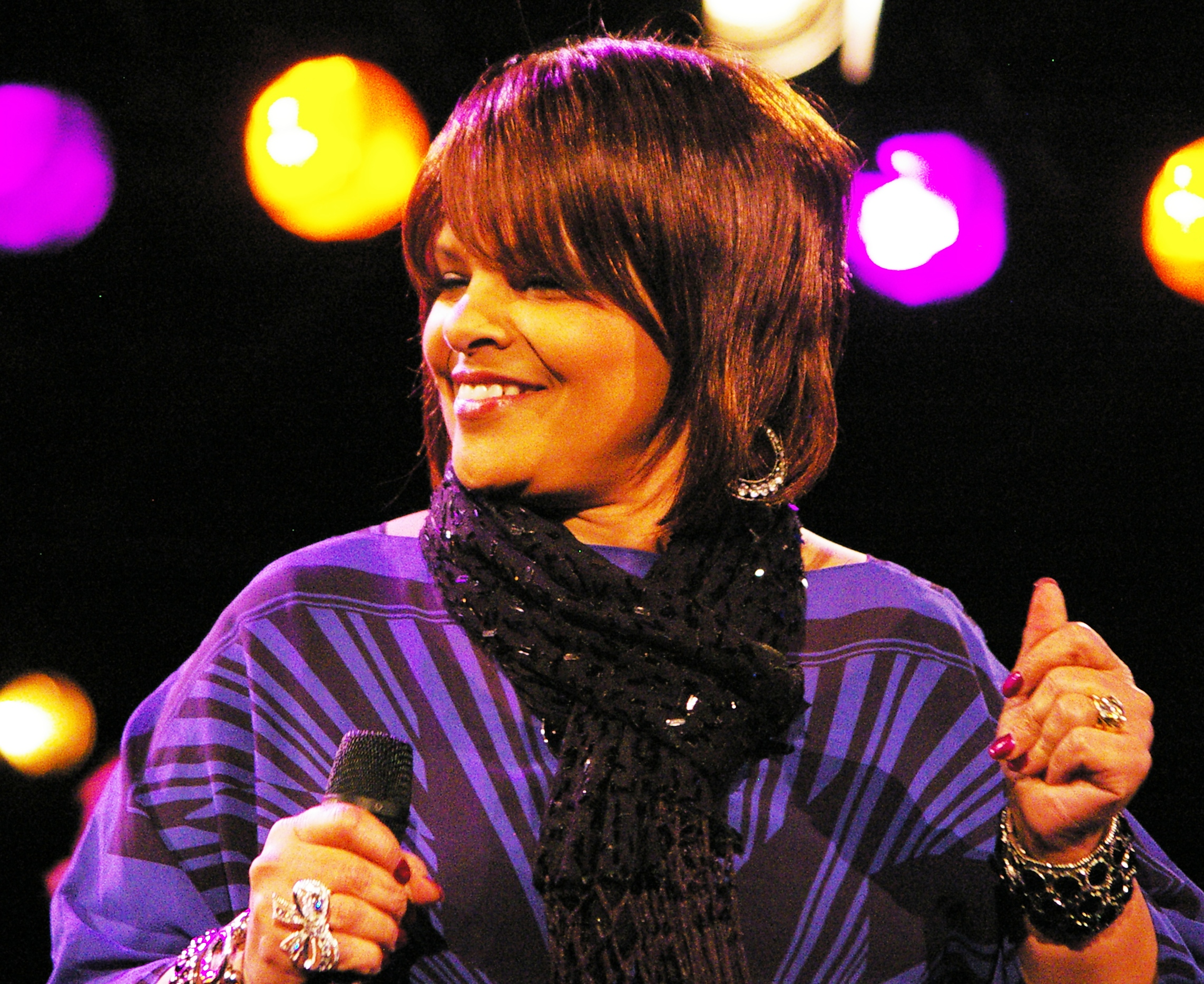
- 2011 Jazzweek Burghausen

Background information
- Also known as: Regina B. Westbrook
- Born: Regina B. Higginbotham; January 22, 1958 (age 68); Dayton, Ohio, United States
- Genres: Electric blues, new blues
- Occupations: Singer, songwriter
- Years active: 1996–present
- Label: Various including CD Baby
- Website: teenytucker.com

Regina B. Higginbotham (born January 22, 1958) known professionally as Teeny Tucker is an American electric blues and new blues singer and songwriter. She is the daughter of the late blues musician Tommy Tucker. AllMusic noted that "Teeny Tucker is among a growing number of female blues belters taking different paths to stardom or wider recognition, but she's one of the very best..." She has released six albums to date.

She has variously appeared on the same bill with B.B. King, Koko Taylor, Etta James, Buddy Guy, the Holmes Brothers, Robert Cray, Keb' Mo', Deanna Bogart, Kenny Neal, Bobby Rush, and John Mayall.

== Life and career ==
Teeny Tucker was born in Dayton, Ohio, United States. She sang in her local church choir. Her father, a blues performer best known for his 1964 hit song, "Hi-Heel Sneakers," died tragically at the age of 42 in January 1982, on his daughter's 24th birthday.

Tucker first performed professionally in November 1996. Her debut album, Tommy's Girl, was issued in 2000. She composed eight of the 11 tracks on her 2003 album, First Class Woman, which had airplay on XM Satellite Radio, Music Choice and various other blues radio stations across the United States. Tucker has twice been a top three finalist in the International Blues Challenge. In 2008, Tucker performed at the Monterey Bay Blues Festival.

Two Big M's (2008) peaked at number six on the Living Blues chart, and was nominated for the best self-produced CD by the Blues Foundation. Keep the Blues Alive (2010) contained more of Tucker's own compositions.

In 2009 and 2011, Tucker performed at the Briggs Farm Blues Festival. In 2010, Tucker, now officially named Regina B. Westbrook, was residing in Columbus, Ohio. In February 2011, Tucker was selected as the 2011 Federal Carter G. Woodson Award winner. In September 2011, Tucker sang at the Blast Furnace Blues Festival.

At the 2014 Blues Music Awards, Diunna Greenleaf won the Koko Taylor Award (Traditional Blues Female), beating fellow nominees Tucker, Lavelle White, Trudy Lynn, and Zora Young. Tucker also performed live at the event. In February that year, Tucker gave a talk on "Women In The Blues," part of the Penn State Forum Speaker Series at Pennsylvania State University. In August 2015, Tucker performed at the Riverside Bluesfest in St. Marys, Ohio.

== Awards and nominations ==
- Monterey Bay 2010 Blues Artist of the Year.
- 2012 and 2014 Blues Music Award "Koko Taylor Award" nominee.
- 2008, 2011 and 2013 Blues Blast "Artist of the Year" nominee.
- 2014 Living Blues magazine "Artist of the Year" nominee.

== Discography ==
=== Albums ===
Year	Title	Record label
2000	Tommy's Girl	Self issued
2003	First Class Woman	Hot Rod Records
2008	Two Big M's	CD Baby/Teebo
2010	Keep the Blues Alive	Teebo
2013	Voodoo To Do You	CD Baby
2018	Put On Your Red Dress Baby	TeBo Records
