= Alexis P. Suter =

American singer-songwriter

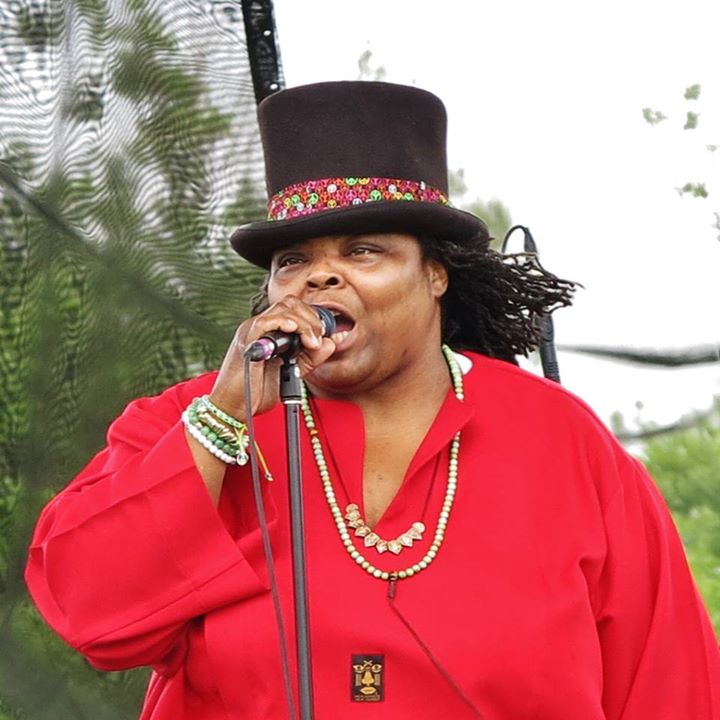
- Suter performing at the 2013 Waterfront Blues Festival

Background information
- Born: February 15, 1963 (age 63); Brooklyn, New York City, U.S.
- Genres: Blues, soul blues
- Occupations: Singer, songwriter
- Instrument: Vocals
- Years active: 1990–present
- Labels: Hipbone Records, others

Alexis P. Suter (born February 15, 1963) is an American blues, and soul blues singer and songwriter, best known for her nomination in the 'Koko Taylor Award' category at the 33rd Blues Music Awards in 2015. She and her backing band have released six albums to date.

== Life and career ==
Alexis P. Suter is the youngest daughter of Carrie and Albert Suter, and was born in Brooklyn, New York City, United States. She began singing in church at the age of four, and met the Mills Brothers and saw them perform in concert five years later. Her interest in music developed at school where she learned to play the sousaphone, and expanded her knowledge of gospel music when attending different churches in her neighborhood. She was also influenced by the work of Ruth Brown, whom she heard on her family's radio. Suter also credited her mother as a source of musical inspiration, given that she had previously provided backing vocals for Mahalia Jackson, Sister Rosetta Tharpe, Harry Belafonte, Mavis Staples and Dionne Warwick amongst others.

Suter released her debut single in 1990, "Slam Me Baby", recorded in a house music setting, which led her to become the first African American woman to be signed to Epic/Sony Records. Years later the track was used on the Live & Remastered compilation album. She later signed with Hipbone Records, releasing Shuga Fix, her debut album in 2005. The same year she and her backing band caught the attention of Levon Helm, who invited them to open for him at his Midnight Rambles in Woodstock, New York.

In 2008, her third album, Just Another Fool, was released by Hipbone Records. It included a guest appearance on piano by Ted Kooshian. Suter has been a guest on The Artie Lange Show and Imus in the Morning, and with her band has opened for artists including Bo Diddley, Dickey Betts, B.B. King, Coco Montoya, Etta James, Buddy Guy, Allen Toussaint, and Emmylou Harris. B.B. King stated "It's a rare thing to share the stage with great talent like that young lady".

Suter was nominated for Soul Blues Female Artist in the 33rd Blues Music Awards, universally recognized as the highest honor given to Blues artists.

On June 11, 2014, John Ginty recorded his Bad News Travels Live DVD, which included a guest performance from Suter.

Her five piece musical ensemble, released their sixth effort, Love the Way You Roll, in August 2014. It contained two cover versions: firstly of Big Mama Thornton's "You Don't Move Me No More" and also Slim Harpo's "Shake Your Hips". The band currently comprises Alexis P. Suter (lead vocals), Ray Grappone (drums), Michael Louis (guitar), Tom Terry (bass guitar) plus Vicki Bell (backing vocals).

Suter and her band have appeared at music festivals including Springing the Blues, Briggs Farm Blues Festival (2007, 2009, and 2011), Musikfest (2011), and Blast Furnace Blues Festival (2012),

In 2015, Suter was nominated in the 'Koko Taylor Award' category at the 36th Blues Music Awards. Ruthie Foster won the title. Suter was again nominated in 2017, this time in the Contemporary Blues Female Artist category in the 38th Blues Music Awards.

== Discography ==
=== Albums ===
Year	Title	Record label
2005	Shuga Fix	Hipbone Records
2006	Alexis P Suter Band Live at the Midnight Ramble	Levon Helm Records
2008	Just Another Fool	Hipbone Records
2009	Live at the Turning Point	Festivalink.net
2011	Two Sides	Hipbone Records
2014	Love the Way You Roll	American Showplace Music
2016	All For Loving You	American Showplace Music
2025	Just Stay High	Nola Blue Records
