= Roadhouse Rules =

Studio album by Lonnie Brooks
- Released: 1996
- Genre: Blues, R&B
- Label: Alligator
- Producer: Jim Gaines

Lonnie Brooks chronology
Let’s Talk It Over (1993)	Roadhouse Rules (1996)	Deluxe Edition (1997)

Roadhouse Rules is an album by the American musician Lonnie Brooks, released in 1996. It was his seventh album for Alligator Records. The album peaked at No. 15 on the Billboard Blues Albums chart. Brooks supported it with a North American tour.

== Production ==
Recorded mostly in Memphis with studio musicians, the album was produced by Jim Gaines. Brooks wrote seven of its songs; he made a point of paying attention to what his blues contemporaries were doing on their albums. It marked the first time that Brooks included an acoustic blues song on an album. Brooks used a Gibson ES-355 on most of the tracks. Sugar Blue played harmonica on "Roll of the Tumbling Dice". The Memphis Horns played on "Too Little, Too Late". "Hoodoo She Do" was written by Brooks's son Ronnie Baker Brooks, who also played guitar on Roadhouse Rules.

== Critical reception ==
Professional ratings
Review scores
Source	Rating
AllMusic	3/5 stars
The Encyclopedia of Popular Music	3/5 stars
MusicHound Blues: The Essential Album Guide	4.5/5 stars
The Penguin Guide to Blues Recordings	3/4 stars
Pittsburgh Post-Gazette	3/4 stars

The St. Louis Post-Dispatch noted the "tough rhythms, deep-from-the-gut singing and guitar riffs to burn, the smell of Chicago permeating the tracks." The Pittsburgh Post-Gazette said that, "blessed with a set of 62-year-old pipes full of finely aged soul and grit, Brooks moves easily from torchy ballads to the sharp edge of hard-rocking blues." The Chicago Tribune wrote that "Brooks pours out a torrent of straight blues, funk, rock and soul rippling with unassailable chops and conviction."

The Wisconsin State Journal called the album "a stirring statement that spans rocking guitar gumbo ('Hoodoo She Do'), soulfully gutty balladry ('Too Little, Too Late') and everything in between." The Press of Atlantic City considered it one of the best blues albums of 1996, concluding that "Brooks moves from modern to retro modes with ease and smarts." The Boston Globe determined that "too many songs fall into woman-done-me-wrong lingo."

AllMusic wrote that "the music on Roadhouse Rules is generally unrelenting in its ferocity, blues-oriented but also quite open to the influences of Stax-type soul and rock."

== Track listing ==
No.	Title	Length
1.	"Hoodoo She Do"
2.	"Backbone Man"
3.	"Too Little, Too Late"
4.	"Stranger in My House"
5.	"I Need a Friend"
6.	"Evil Twin"
7.	"Roll of the Tumbling Dice"
8.	"One Track Train"
9.	"Before You Go"
10.	"Get Through to You"
11.	"It's Your World"
12.	"Treat Me Like Your Dog"
13.	"Stake My Claim"
14.	"Rockin' Red Rooster"
