= Serious (Luther Allison album) =

Studio album by Luther Allison
- Released: 1987
- Genre: Blues
- Length: 45:57
- Label: Blind Pig
- Producer: Michael Carras

Luther Allison chronology
Here I Come (1985)	Serious (1987)	Soul Fixin' Man (1994)

Serious is an album by American blues guitarist Luther Allison, released in 1987 on the Blind Pig label.

Professional ratings
Review scores
Source	Rating
Allmusic	link

== Track listing ==
All songs by Luther Allison, unless otherwise noted.

1. "Backtrack" - 2:51
2. "Life Is a Bitch" - 3:39
3. "Reaching Out" (Allison, Michael Carras) - 4:55
4. "Parking Lot" - 2:39
5. "Serious" - 5:06
6. "Just Memories" (Allison, Carras) - 6:00
7. "Should I Wait?" - 3:17
8. "Show Me a Reason" - 7:12
9. "Let's Try It Again" - 6:47
10. "We're On the Road" - 3:48

== Personnel ==
- Luther Allison - vocals, guitar, slide guitar
- Samy Ateba - percussion
- Michael Carras - keyboards
- Jacques Higelin - piano
- Frank "Fast Frank" Rabasté - guitar, backing vocals
- Mario Satterfield - fretless bass
- Jimi Schutte - drums, backing vocals
- Jean-Pierre Solves - saxophone
- Jean Louis Chautemps - saxophone
- Alain Hatot - saxophone
- Freddy Hovsepian - trumpet
- Tony Russo - trumpet
