= Soul Fixin' Man =

Studio album by Luther Allison
- Released: 1994
- Genre: Blues
- Label: Alligator
- Producer: Jim Gaines

Luther Allison chronology
Serious (1987)	Soul Fixin' Man (1994)	Blue Streak (1994)

Soul Fixin' Man is an album by American blues guitarist Luther Allison, released in 1994 by Alligator Records. It is also known as Bad Love. Some editions have a different track listing.

== Critical reception ==
Professional ratings
Review scores
Source	Rating
AllMusic	4.5/5 stars
Music Week	3/5 stars
The Penguin Guide to Blues Recordings	3.5/4 stars

Scott Yanow wrote on AllMusic, "A powerful player whose intensity on this set sometimes borders on rock (although remaining quite grounded in blues), Luther Allison (who contributed eight of the dozen songs) displays the large amount of musical growth he had experienced since the mid-'70s. Joined by his quintet, the Memphis Horns, and (on "Freedom") a choir, Allison is heard throughout in top form."

== Track listing ==
1. "Bad Love" (Luther Allison, James Solberg) - 6:23
2. "I Want to Know" (Ron Badger, Sugar Pie DeSanto, Robert Geddins) - 4:52
3. "Soul Fixin' Man" (Allison, Solberg) - 3:07
4. "Middle of the Road" (Allison) - 4:55
5. "She Was Born That Way" (Bob Johnson, Sam Mosley) - 4:38
6. "Give It All" (Allison) - 3:56
7. "You Been Teasin' Me" (Allison, Solberg) - 3:01
8. "Nobody but You" (Allison, Solberg) - 4:30
9. "Put Your Money Where Your Mouth Is" (Allison, Solberg) - 6:28
10. "The Things I Used to Do" (Guitar Slim) - 3:18
11. "Love String" (Johnson, Mosley) - 3:53
12. "Freedom" (Allison, Michael Carras, Oscar Brown, Jr., Frank "Fast Frank" Rabaste) - 4:47

== Personnel ==
- Luther Allison - vocals, guitar
- Kpe Lee - percussion
- James Robinson - drums
- David Smith - bass guitar
- James Solberg - guitar
- Ernest Williamson - keyboards
- Wayne Jackson - trombone, trumpet
- Andrew Love - saxophone
- Jacqueline Johnson - backing vocals
- Another Blessed Creation Choir - chorus
