= Eric Steckel =

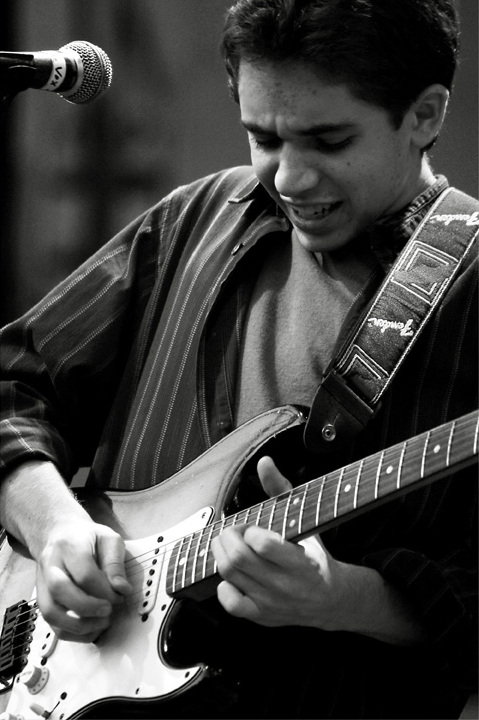
- Steckel in 2007

Background information
- Born: 1990 (age 35–36); Lehigh County, Pennsylvania, U.S.
- Genres: Blues, blues rock
- Occupations: Singer, guitarist, songwriter, record producer
- Instruments: Vocals, guitar, piano
- Years active: 2002–present
- Label: Various
- Website: Official website

Eric Steckel (born 1990) is an American blues singer, guitarist, songwriter, and record producer. To date, Steckel has released 12 albums, and toured worldwide sharing the billing with Steve Vai, Gregg Allman, Johnny Winter, John Mayall, Ray Charles, Larry Carlton, Robben Ford, and others. In March 2024, Steckel was voted number 55 in Total Guitar magazine's list of "The 100 Greatest Blues Guitarists of All Time". In 2021, Steckel was named one of "10 Future Blues Stars” by Guitar Player.

== Career ==
Steckel was born in Lehigh County, Pennsylvania. A young talent on the guitar, Steckel recorded his debut album, A Few Degrees Warmer (2002), at the age of 11. The collection contained three tracks written, or co-written, by Steckel. A year later he became the youngest musician to perform with John Mayall & the Bluesbreakers, having been invited to play with them on stage, following his own appearance in the 2003 Sarasota Blues Fest. In 2004, Steckel joined John Mayall and his ensemble on tour in Scandinavia. The following year, Steckel recorded with Mayall in Los Angeles, providing guitar work on one track on the latter's Road Dogs album Steckel's next own album, High Action, followed.

Steckel then issued several studio and live albums, including Feels Like Home (2008), where he employed the percussionist Duane Trucks on drums. The album's overall sound evoked the feel of 1970s southern rock. In addition, Steckel toured widely particularly throughout Europe, where he supported Johnny Winter at the Paradiso in Amsterdam, performed at the Tegelen Bluesrock Festival and shared the bill at the Pistoia Blues Festival with Gregg Allman. He also in May 2010 performed at the Café Wilhelmina in Eindhoven, and played on a number of occasions at Musikfest. In 2012, he recorded the studio album, Dismantle The Sun. It was promoted by Steckel's first UK tour, and the album contained seven tracks co-written by him plus his version of the Mel London penned "Sugar Sweet" (as originally recorded by Muddy Waters), which incorporated blues harmonica from Steve Guyger. In 2015, Steckel made his first transatlantic studio album, when Black Gold was jointly recorded in Nashville, Tennessee and Amsterdam, Netherlands.

His 2018 release, Polyphonic Prayer saw the emergence of what Steckel considers his 'bluesmetal' era, with more up to date guitar and production styles. It saw Steckel tackle every instrument on the album, apart from the drums. Grandview Drive (2020) took the 'bluesmetal' sound onwards, and included full Steckel production credits, before the COVID-19 pandemic curtailed activities for many. Steckel has been featured in Premier Guitar, Guitar Player, Guitarist, Guitar World, Classic Rock, The Morning Call, The Intelligencer, The Philadelphia Inquirer, Times Herald-Record, Sarasota Herald-Tribune, and The Florida Times-Union. International press includes a feature in the Haagsche Courant. He has appeared on NBC 10, Comcast CN8, SNN6, and Reuters TV.

In March 2022, Steckel took his Los Angeles-based rhythm section to Steve Lukather's Steakhouse Studio in North Hollywood for an impromptu live session. Using zero autotune, samples, overdubs or re-takes, Steckel and his band performed a live set of original material, which was captured on tape and video. The Steakhouse Sessions: Vol. 1 (released September 22) is Steckel's latest release on his own Bluzmtl Records label. Later the same year, Steckel undertook his first tour of the UK for eight years. He commented "I've been on the road since I was 12 years old and there’s no place on Earth I'd rather be than on stage. I am beyond thrilled to be finally returning to the stage in Spring 2022". In April and May that year he performed across parts of Europe, and recommenced those activities in September and October.

== Discography ==
=== Albums ===
Year	Title	Record label
2002	A Few Degrees Warmer	Muttlee Records
2004	High Action	Me & My Blues Records
2006	Havanna	CD Baby
2006	Live at Havanna	Me & My Blues Records
2007	Early Pickin'	CD Baby
2008	Feels Like Home	Me & My Blues Records
2010	Milestone	Eric Steckel Music
2012	Dismantle the Sun	Eric Steckel Music
2015	Black Gold	Eric Steckel Music
2018	Polyphonic Prayer	Eric Steckel Music
2020	Grandview Drive	Eric Steckel Music
2022	The Steakhouse Sessions: Vol. 1	Bluzmtl Records
2023	The Steakhouse Sessions: Vol. 2	Bluzmtl Records
2026	Sandstorm	P&C SPV Recordings
