= Terry "Harmonica" Bean =

American songwriter

- Born: Terry Wayne Bean; January 26, 1961 (age 64); Pontotoc, Mississippi, United States
- Genres: Hill country blues
- Occupation(s): Harmonicist, guitarist, songwriter
- Instrument(s): Harmonica, guitar
- Years active: 1980s–present
- Labels: Mud Creek Studio, Wolf Records

Terry Wayne "Harmonica" Bean (born January 26, 1961) is an American blues harmonicist, guitarist and songwriter. He has released seven albums since 2001, and appeared in three film documentaries charting present day blues experiences.

Bean has dedicated himself to promoting older blues stylings, such as Delta blues and Hill country blues. "What's stimulating to me," he said, "is people hearing the blues played like they used to hear it."

== Biography ==
Bean was born in Pontotoc, Mississippi, United States, where he has remained living to date. His father, Eddie Bean, was a blues guitarist who played in an electric blues band, and encouraged his son to play both harmonica and guitar. A sharecropper, he also enlisted his twenty four children in assisting in picking cotton to earn a living. Terry Bean played for his school and in American Legion baseball, before two traffic accidents meant that his competitive career finished in his early twenties. In 1988, Bean saw Robert Lockwood, Jr. play at a music festival in Greenville, Mississippi, and this experience inspired Bean to perform regularly in and around Greensville for the next few years. Bean became more versatile, appearing as a one-man band, accompanist or band leader and he variously worked with T-Model Ford, Asie Payton and Lonnie Pitchford.

Bean's first solo recording, Here I Am Baby, was released in 2001. This has been followed by six more albums, using a variety of musical ensemble settings.

He plays both harmonica and guitar, occasionally at the same time, and has performed at blues festivals, and in juke joints, to supplement his regular income gained from working in a furniture factory in Pontotoc. Playing solo, or with his own blues ensemble, Bean also made an appearance as himself in the 2008 documentary film, M For Mississippi, making mention of his daytime employment. Four years later Bean had a part in the film's follow-up, We Juke Up In Here, where he notes the decline in the number of performance outlets, such as juke joints. Bean has been a regular performer at the Briggs Farm Blues Festival in Pennsylvania, appearing in 2005, 2010 and 2011.

Bean played harmonica on T-Model Ford's 2008 album, Jack Daniel Time.

In 2011, Bean toured Italy, played in concert in France in March 2013, and made a more comprehensive European tour in 2013, whilst sticking to performing in a traditional blues style. His most recent album, Catfish Blues, was issued by the Austrian-based Wolf Records in March 2014. One music journalist commented "On Catfish Blues, Terry "Harmonica" Bean delivers a pitch perfect hill country experience that can be enjoyed from the smoky haze of the barroom to the quiet desks of the archives."

He also was on the bill of the Muddy Roots Festival in August 2014. From 2014 to 2015, Bean appeared in the television series, Moonshine & Mojo Hands.

== Discography ==
=== Albums ===
Year of release	Album title	Record label
2001	Here I Am Baby	Mud Creek Studio
2001	Jus Messin Roun	Mud Creek Studio
2002	Rockin in the Dirty South	Mud Creek Studio
2007	Two Sides of the Blues	CD Baby
2010	Hill Country Blues With The Big Sound	RightCoast
2014	Catfish Blues	Wolf Records
2016	Rock This House Tonight: Live At Right Coast	CD Baby

== Filmography ==
- M For Mississippi (2008)
- We Juke Up In Here (2012)
- Moonshine & Mojo Hands (2014-5, TV)
- ReMastered: Devil at the Crossroads (2019, Netflix)

== See also ==
- List of harmonica blues musicians
