= Ernie Lancaster =

American songwriter

- Born: Ernest Ray Lancaster; November 30, 1953; Georgia, United States
- Origin: Florida, United States
- Died: July 17, 2014 (aged 60) Mount Dora, Florida, United States
- Genres: Electric blues, blues rock
- Occupation(s): Guitarist, songwriter
- Instrument: Guitar
- Years active: 1970s–2014
- Labels: Ichiban, Rip Bang
- Website: Official website

Ernie Lancaster (November 30, 1953 – July 17, 2014) was an American electric blues and blues rock guitarist and songwriter. He released two solo albums. Lancaster had the ability to vary his style between strict blues, and rock, jazz, soul and pop.

He cited his influences as Roy Buchanan, Stevie Ray Vaughan and John Lee Hooker.

== Life and career ==
Ernest Ray Lancaster was born in Georgia, United States. He later grew up in South Carolina before relocating with his family to Mount Dora, Florida. He formed his own band while at school, which eventually played at Stetson University and on television in Orlando. After dropping out of college, and getting married at age 19, he was a founding member of the Sex Change Band in the mid-1970s. As the backing outfit for Root Boy Slim, the band was a fixture in the mid-Atlantic blues and rock scene, and favored a mix of Memphis-style boogie rock/blues. They recorded an album for Warner Bros. Records in 1978, their first of six records. In 1989, Lancaster played on the Pee Wee, Fred and Maceo album recorded by the JB Horns.

Lancaster's guitar work appeared on numerous albums in the 1980s and 1990s, before he released his debut solo album. That was Ernestly, an all instrumental affair, which was released on Ichiban Records in 1991. Other musicians Lancaster supplied guitar playing for included Rufus Thomas, Reverend Billy C. Wirtz, Kenny Neal, Noble Watts and Lucky Peterson. The latter musician was heavily involved in playing the Hammond organ on Lancaster's first album, with a co-starring credit noted on the album's sleeve. The AllMusic journalist, Alex Henderson, noted that "Although not stunning, Ernestly provides some gritty and unpretentious fun."

In 1993, Lancaster played guitar in James Brown's backing band, during their European tour.

Lancaster's second album, Lightnin' Alley, which comprised self composed tracks (in a similar vein to his first album) was issued in May 2008. He also appeared at the Boundary Waters Blues Festival.

Lancaster died from pancreatic cancer, at his home in Mount Dora, Florida, in July 2014, aged 60.

== Discography ==
Year	Title	Record label
1991	Ernestly	Ichiban
2008	Lightnin' Alley	Rip Bang

== See also ==
- List of electric blues musicians
- List of soul-blues musicians
