= Blue Streak (album) =

Studio album by Luther Allison
- Released: September 5, 1995
- Genre: Blues
- Length: 53:25
- Label: Alligator
- Producer: Jim Gaines, Luther Allison, James Solberg

Luther Allison chronology
| Soul Fixin' Man (1994) | Blue Streak (1995) | Time (1995) |

Professional ratings
Review scores
| Source | Rating |
|---|---|
| AllMusic | 4/5 stars |
| The Penguin Guide to Blues Recordings | 4/4 stars |

Blue Streak is an album by American blues guitarist Luther Allison, released in 1995 by Alligator Records. Guitar World magazine named it one of the top guitar records of 1995. The album enabled Allison to win five W. C. Handy Awards in 1996, including Contemporary Blues Album for Blue Streak and Blues Song for "Cherry Red Wine".

== Track listing ==
1. "All the King's Horses" (Allison, Solberg) – 5:36
2. "What Have I Done Wrong?" (Maghett, Magic Sam) – 4:48
3. "Big City" (Allison, Solberg) – 5:24
4. "Move from the Hood" (Allison, Solberg) – 3:41
5. "What's Going On in My Home?" (Allison, Solberg) – 4:06
6. "I Believe in Me" (Allison, Solberg) – 4:36
7. "Cherry Red Wine" (Allison) – 4:21
8. "Walking Papers" (Allison, Solberg) – 4:28
9. "Think With Your Heart" (Allison, Allison, Solberg) – 4:57
10. "You Don't Know" (Allison, Solberg) – 2:47
11. "Should I Wait?" (Allison) – 5:04
12. "Midnight Creeper" (Allison) – 3:37

== Personnel ==
- Luther Allison – vocals, guitar
- James Solberg – guitar
- Ernest Williamson – keyboards
- Dave Smith – bass
- Steve Potts – drums
- Mike Vlahakis – keyboards
- Ken Faltinson – bass
- Robb Stupka – drums
- Bruce McCabe – piano
- Charlie Bingham – rhythm guitar
- The Memphis Horns – horn section
- Jacqueline Johnson – background vocals
- Jacqueline Reddick – background vocals

== Chart positions ==
| Year | Chart | Position |
|---|---|---|
| 1995 | Billboard Top Blues Albums | 9 |
