= Floyd Miles =

American drummer (1943–2018)

- Born: April 13, 1943; Daytona Beach, Florida, U.S.
- Died: January 25, 2018 (aged 74)
- Genres: Electric blues, soul blues
- Occupations: Guitarist, singer, songwriter
- Instruments: Guitar, vocals, drums
- Years active: 1960s–2018
- Labels: Ichiban Records, Kingsnake Records, Beloved Records, Rock House Records
- Website: http://www.floydmiles.com

Floyd Miles (April 13, 1943 – January 25, 2018) was an American electric blues and soul blues guitarist, singer and songwriter. He released four solo albums from 1992 onwards.

== Life and career ==
Miles was born and raised in Daytona Beach, Florida, growing up as the youngest of eleven children. He left home at the age of 15.

His musical career really started when playing with The Universals, a soul band which were locally popular in the early 1960s. At the time Miles was a singing drummer for the band, and he befriended both Gregg and Duane Allman, who lived nearby and jammed with the band.

After playing drums and singing with several other local groups, Miles founded his own band, which backed musicians such as Arthur Conley, Erma Franklin, Curtis Mayfield, Eddie Floyd and Percy Sledge. Through his friendship of the Allmans, Miles moved on to supply guitar backing for Clarence Carter. He later performed with the London Symphony Orchestra.

His debut solo album was Crazy Man (1992), which included musical assistance from Gregg Allman and Dickey Betts. Goin' Back to Daytona was released in 1994. Miles gained greater national prominence when he played on tour with the ensemble Gregg Allman & Friends.

His third album, Mountain to Climb (1999), was released by Beloved Records. His last recording, Another Man Will, produced by Roy Roberts, was released in 2002. Miles performed at the Boundary Waters Blues Festival and, in 1996 and 2009, at the Sarasota Blues Fest.

== Death ==
Miles died on January 25, 2018, at the age of 74.

== Discography ==
Year	Title	Record label
1992	Crazy Man	Ichiban
1996	Goin' Back to Daytona	Kingsnake
1999	Mountain to Climb	Beloved
2002	Another Man Will	Rock House

== See also ==
- List of electric blues musicians
- List of soul-blues musicians
