= Lonnie Shields =

American singer-songwriter

- Born: Lonnie Thomas Shields Jr. April 17, 1956 (age 69); West Helena, Arkansas, United States
- Genres: Electric blues
- Occupation(s): Singer, songwriter, guitarist
- Instrument(s): Guitar, vocals
- Years active: Mid 1980s–present
- Labels: Rooster Blues, JSP Records, various
- Website: Official website

Lonnie Shields (born April 17, 1956) is an American electric blues singer, songwriter, and guitarist. His primary influence was B.B. King. He has released seven albums to date, and one publication described his music as "bewitching, funk-influenced variations on the oldest country blues".

== Life and career ==
Lonnie Thomas Shields Jr. was born in West Helena, Arkansas, United States, with his local church being a focus for family life. Due to its similar musical heritage, West Helena is often considered an extension of the Mississippi Delta. He started his music career by playing funk and soul as a teenager in a local group called the Checkmates. This was before his friend and mentor, Sam Carr, based in Lula, Mississippi, showed Shields the rudiments of Delta blues. The twosome played together in the Unforgettable Blues Band, and took guidance from Frank Frost and Big Jack Johnson. Shields later played live with all three of them when performing with the Jelly Roll Kings.

In 1986, Shields appeared at the King Biscuit Blues Festival in his hometown, and was invited to record a single, "Cheatin' Woman" (1988) for the Rooster Blues label. He thus became the first artist from the Delta that Rooster Blues signed, following their relocation in 1986 to Clarksdale, Mississippi. Lonnie Pitchford and Shields helped in the construction of the new recording studio facilities. That initial recording led to him issuing his debut album, Portrait, on Rooster Blues in 1993, which achieved notable critical acclaim, being cited as one of the best debut albums of that year. In addition, Portrait won the Living Blues Critics' Poll as Best Album. The album had contributions from Carr, Frost and Johnson, as well as other Delta musicians including Lucky Peterson (guitar), Eddie Shaw (guitar and saxophone) and Jim O'Neal (producer). Shields then appeared at various festivals throughout the Northeast.

Tired of Waiting (1996) followed, before Shields released Blues Is on Fire the following year, each appearing on the London based record label, JSP Records. Both albums were produced by Johnny Rawls. In 1998, Shields was filmed at the 100 Club in London, England, which was issued as a video with the title of The Blues Soul of Lonnie Shields.

In 2000, Midnight Delight was released by Rooster Blues. With a growing fan base, Shields toured across the United States, Canada and Europe. His recording career stalled at this point and it was not until 2008 that his next effort, Keeper of the Blues, was released. The title was inspired by the nickname acquired by Shields, being among the somewhat younger generation of Mississippi blues men keeping the music alive. In 2012, Shields self-released his 'Cause the World Ain't Been Good to You album, which was described as a fusion of blues, R&B and gospel. All proceeds were donated to the Child Life Department at the Children's Hospital of Philadelphia, which provides support to children in dire medical circumstances.

In April 2014, Shields appeared in Rock Hall, Maryland, as part of the MainstayBlues series. In October the same year, Shields performed once again at the King Biscuit Blues Festival.

He appeared again at the Briggs Farm Blues Festival in July 2016, where he not only played but sold his own Delta-style barbecue food.

Shields has a home in Media, Pennsylvania.

== Discography ==
=== Albums ===
Year	Title	Record label
1992	Portrait	Rooster Blues
1996	Tired of Waiting	JSP Records
1997	Blues Is on Fire	JSP Records
2000	Midnight Delight	Rooster Blues
2008	Keeper of the Blues	Greater Planet
2012	'Cause the World Ain't Been Good to You	CD Baby
2017	Çode Blue	New Mellenium Records
