= Root Boy Slim =

American musician (1944-1993)

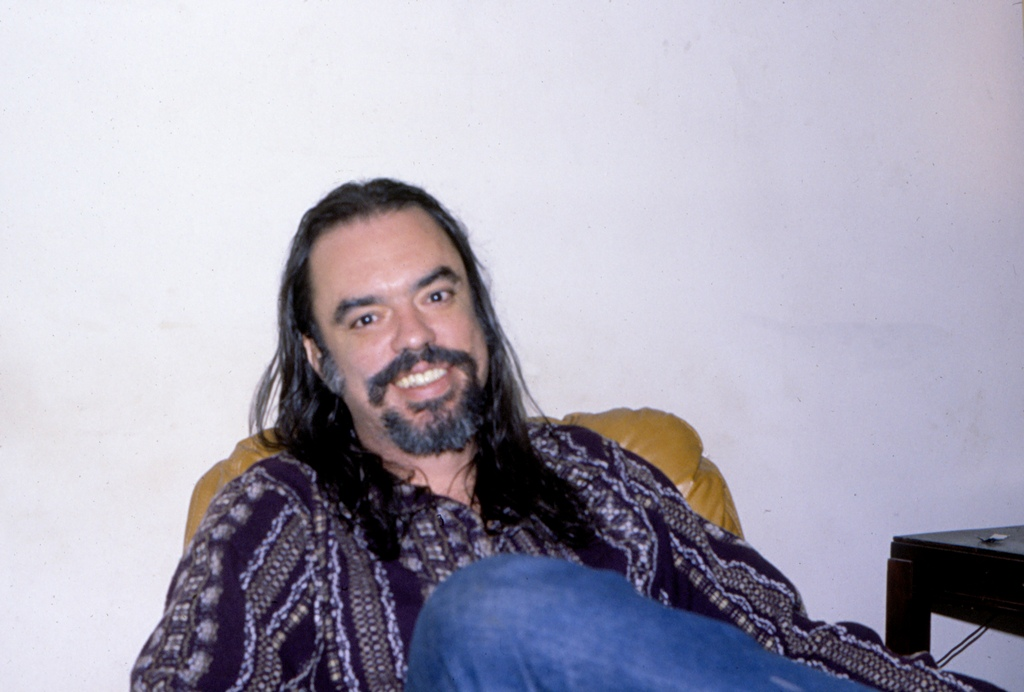
- Root Boy Slim relaxing in his Takoma Park, Maryland home in 1980

Background information
- Also known as: The Duke of Puke
- Born: Foster MacKenzie III; July 9, 1944; Asheville, North Carolina, U.S.
- Origin: Takoma Park, Maryland, U.S.
- Died: June 8, 1993 (aged 48) Orlando, Florida, U.S.
- Genres: Alternative rock, Southern rock, blues rock, punk blues
- Occupations: Musician, songwriter
- Instruments: Vocals, guitar
- Years active: 1978–1993
- Labels: Warner Bros.; IRS; Congressional; King Snake; Ichiban; Naked Language

Foster MacKenzie III (July 9, 1944 – June 8, 1993), known professionally as Root Boy Slim, was an American musician and songwriter.

He was born in Asheville, North Carolina but raised in Washington, D.C.'s Maryland suburbs. He was an exceptionally bright child with parents who were able to afford a series of costly prep schools, and he attended Yale University. He returned to Maryland upon receiving his bachelor's degree and was diagnosed with schizophrenia following an LSD-induced psychotic episode. In the 1970s, he formed his own alternative rock band (including musicians such as tenor saxophonist Ron Holloway) and an ensemble titled Crying Out Loud. Mackenzie's group was ultimately billed as Root Boy Slim and the Sex Change Band and The Rootettes. The band cultivated a dedicated fan base, largely confined to the Washington metropolitan area.

MacKenzie died in his sleep in his home in Orlando, Florida at age 48 and is buried in Fletcher, North Carolina. He was inducted into the Washington Area Music Association Hall of Fame in 2004.

== Background ==
MacKenzie was an intelligent yet incorrigible youth, who was asked to leave several private D.C.-area prep schools, including Sidwell Friends School. He finally found his niche at Saint James School in Hagerstown, Maryland, a boarding school, where along with his studies, he played varsity football. He was accepted to and attended Yale University, majoring in American studies and black history, and graduated in 1967. He was a member of the Delta Kappa Epsilon fraternity, where his fraternity brothers included future President George W. Bush. MacKenzie was a year older than Bush.

While at Yale, MacKenzie formed a band with classmate and fraternity brother Bob Greenlee, who was captain of Yale's football team. The band was named Prince La La and the Midnight Creepers. MacKenzie's growing dislike of authority and inner inclination to play pranks and his love of shock value expanded. Band members wore ermine capes and silver lamé hot pants and boasted that they were never invited for return engagements. The year after MacKenzie and Greenlee graduated, they returned to the DKE house during Yale's homecoming. Bush, who since their departure had become president of DKE, threw them out and banned them from the house.

After graduation, MacKenzie drove an ice cream truck in Washington, D.C. One day he suffered a psychotic break after a particularly high dose of LSD, and he climbed over the White House fence. The United States Secret Service apprehended him as he ran up the White House lawn. He told the officers he was "looking for the center of the universe." They hauled him off to St. Elizabeths Hospital, the largest long-term mental hospital that serves Washington, D.C. That incident led to a diagnosis of schizophrenia, for which MacKenzie was medicated for the rest of his life.

== Sex Change Band ==
Mackenzie adopted the stage name of Root Boy Slim, and formed a blues rock band, which he dubbed "Root Boy Slim and the Sex Change Band." His backup singers were called the Rootettes. The band members were stridently different than most club fare. Root Boy was fat, had greasy hair, and almost always seemed to be in a drug- or alcohol-induced stupor. The band was a fixture in the mid-Atlantic blues/rock scene, and favored a mix of Memphis-style boogie rock/blues.

Root Boy and company traveled the club circuit, until a self-produced recording caught the ear of some A&R representatives at Warner Bros. Records. That song was called "Xmas At K-Mart" and it landed the band a $250,000 contract with Warner Bros. That tune and the follow-up LP demonstrated Root and the band's penchant for writing tunes relating to pop culture.

"This band satisfies the first requirement of rock and roll comedy—they play their simplified Little Feat funk well enough to make fun of it. Inspirational Verse: 'Hey look out buddy/Get off my wig/Oops I didn't realize/You was quite so big.'"

— Review of Root Boy Slim & the Sex Change Band Featuring the Rootettes in Christgau's Record Guide: Rock Albums of the Seventies (1981)

Their most famous recording was "Boogie 'Til You Puke" from the debut album Root Boy Slim and the Sex Change Band with the Rootettes (Warner Bros. Records, 1978), which was produced by Gary Katz, best known as the producer of Steely Dan recordings from 1972 through 1980. Katz later said that Root Boy Slim and the Sex Change Band with the Rootettes was his favorite of the dozens of albums he had produced over the course of his career, and one of the few that he ever listens to. The debut album also featured the songs "I Used To Be a Radical", "I'm Not Too Old For You", and "(You Broke My) Mood Ring." Most of the songs were written by MacKenzie, guitarist Ernie Lancaster, and bassist Bob Greenlee. The lyrics often satirized society and mixed in autobiographical elements from MacKenzie's storied life. Warner mismarketed the LP, and the band found themselves without a label—but not without having had a European tour, in which Root Boy became enamored with his forefathers' homeland: Scotland.

The band also performed the song "Boogie 'Til You Puke" in the Party Doll Lounge on 42nd St in New York in Mr. Mike's Mondo Video (1979), a satire of the Italian produced exploitation "shockumentary" Mondo Cane (1962). The film was produced and directed by Michael O'Donoghue, the famed Saturday Night Live head writer, and also featured appearances from Dan Aykroyd, Bill Murray, Laraine Newman, Gilda Radner, and Sid Vicious among others.

During the same year, the band played a date at the Varsity Grill's Back Room in College Park, Maryland, which was one of the main bars popular with students at the University of Maryland, College Park. A riot broke out in the bar and outside on U.S. Route 1, which later led the College Park City Council to ban the band from future engagements in College Park. The ban was lifted in 1980, and Root Boy and crew triumphantly returned in a concert in the university's Ritchie Coliseum.

Miles Copeland III signed the band to his Illegal Records label, which was a spin-off from I.R.S. Records, and released their second LP, Zoom, on I.R.S. in the US, with distribution on Illegal Records in the UK. Despite the use of strong marketing efforts, the LP was just as commercially unsuccessful as the previous one, with the band being dropped by the label. Despite their disappointment, Root Boy Slim And The Sex Change Band continued playing the bar circuit along the Atlantic seaboard and released four more LPs: Dog Secrets on Congressional Records, Don't Let This Happen to You and Left for Dead for Kingsnake Records, and Root Six on Naked Language Records.

Eventually, most of the original band members went their separate ways, reuniting mostly for recording projects. For nightclub performances, Root Boy was backed by a series of other bands, including Ron Holloway and Cryin' Out Loud, New Hope for the Criminally Insane, Capital Offense (featuring Wayne Tomlinson, Tommy Lepson, Timm Biery, Ron Holloway and Dominic Vigliotti), Barbecue Juiceheads, and the Humans.

Root Boy Slim and the Sex Change Band's fifth anniversary took place in 1982 at the PsycheDelly in Bethesda, Maryland, and featured home movies of Root Boy, who wore an orange and white checkered 7-Eleven clerk's shirt and a white 10-gallon cowboy hat throughout the concert. The band's 10th anniversary concert took place at The Roxy, a club in downtown Washington. A line formed hours prior to that show and the club's three levels were standing room only. By the time the fourth set began, there were at least 25 musicians on the stage who had recorded or played clubs with Root Boy during his career. That show was also the debut of "Rich White Republican," a biting satiric attack on Republicans that prophesied the eventual election of George H.W. Bush to the White House. The band sold bumper stickers that read "Root Boy Slim owes me money."

== Death ==
On June 8, 1993, MacKenzie died in his sleep in his home in Orlando, Florida. After his death, the Washington Area Music Association held a memorial concert at The Bayou on K Street in Georgetown. Root Boy fans traveled from as far away as California to pay homage to "The Lenny Bruce of the Blues."

Slim's final resting place is in a grave beside his father's in Calvary Church Cemetery on Hendersonville Road in Fletcher, North Carolina, just south of Asheville. His grave is in the cemetery's northwest corner.

== Discography ==
- Root Boy Slim and the Sex Change Band with the Rootettes (Warner Bros. Records, 1978)
- Zoom (I.R.S. Records 1979)
- Dog Secrets (Congressional Records, 1983)
- Don't Let This Happen to You (Kingsnake, 1986)
- Left for Dead (Kingsnake, 1987)
- Root 6 (Ichiban Records, 1991)

== Sex Change Band members ==
- Bob "Rattlesnake Rattles" Greenlee - Bass
- Ernie "Sex Ray" Lancaster - Guitar
- Ron Holloway - Tenor saxophone
- Winston Kelly - Hammond B-3 organ, keyboards
- Walt Andrews - "Cosmo Creek" Steel guitar
- Tommy Ruger - Drums
- Cherie Grasso (Rootette) - Background vocals
- Marina "Mikki" Lee Jonne (Rootette) - Background vocals
- Kathe "Special K" Russell (Rootette) - Background vocals
- Albert "Kung Fu Shorty" Bashor - Drums
- Dick Bangham (Rootette) - Background vocals, trombone
- Marshall Keys - Alto saxophone

== Band members (post Sex Change Band) ==
- Ron Holloway - Tenor saxophone
- Tommy Lepson - Keyboards
- Steuart Smith - Guitar
- Jim Hanson - Bass
- Steve Dennis - Drums
- Elliot Jagoda - Bass
- Ray Tilkens - Guitar
- Dan Hovey - Guitar
- Wayne Tomlinson - Guitar
- Dominic Vigliotti - Bass.
- Timm Biery - Drums
- Deanna Bogart - Tenor saxophone
- Scott Ambush - Bass
- Paul Reed Smith - Guitar
- Torro Gamble – Drums
- Brandon Finley - Drums
- Brent Mingle - Bass
- Tyrone Brunson (musician) - Bass
- Jim Orr - Keyboards
- Johnny Castle - Bass
- Reverend Billy C. Wirtz - Hammond B-3 Organ, keyboards
- Scott Hymes - keyboards
- John Zidar - Drums
- Rex Wilson - Drums
- John Lee - Drums
- Mary Taylor (Rootette) - Background vocals
- Tammy Whynot (Rootette) - Background vocals
