= Reckless (Luther Allison album) =

Studio album by Luther Allison
- Released: March 25, 1997
- Genre: Blues
- Length: 65:18
- Label: Alligator
- Producer: Jim Gaines

Luther Allison chronology
| Live in Montreux (1996) | Reckless (1997) | Live in Chicago (1999) |

Reckless is an album by the American blues guitarist and singer Luther Allison, released in 1997.

== Critical reception ==
Professional ratings
Review scores
| Source | Rating |
|---|---|
| AllMusic | 3/5 stars |
| The Penguin Guide to Blues Recordings | 3/4 stars |
| Uncut | 3/5 stars |

Cub Koda, for AllMusic, stated: "Luther's third album for Alligator finds the 50-something bluesman truly at the peak of his powers. His superb guitar playing has never been more focused, and his singing shows a fervent shouter in full command ... The production by Jim Gaines delivers a modern-sounding album that stays firmly in the blues tradition while giving full vent to Luther's penchant for blending soul, rock and funk grooves into his musical stew."

== Track listing ==
All tracks composed by Luther Allison and James Solberg; except where indicated

1. "Low Down and Dirty" (Bernard Allison) - 3:45
2. "You Can Run but You Can't Hide" (Paul Butterfield, Henry Glover) - 3:32
3. "Living in the House of the Blues" (Jerry Williams) - 5:32
4. "You Can, You Can" - 3:42
5. "Will It Ever Change?" - 5:09
6. "Just As I Am" (Sandy Carroll)- 4:55
7. "There Comes a Time" - 4:12
8. "Drowning at the Bottom" - 3:54
9. "Playin' a Losin' Game" (B. Allison, L. Allison) - 5:30
10. "It's a Blues Thing" - 5:40
11. "Cancel My Check" - 4:19
12. "Pain in the Streets" - 4:43
13. "You're Gonna Make Me Cry" (Deadric Malone) - 6:13
14. "I'm Back" - 4:12

== Personnel ==
Musicians

- Luther Allison – guitar, vocals
- Lloyd Allison – drums
- Kurt Clayton – electric piano
- Ken Faltinson – bass
- Marla Glen – harmonica
- Willie Hayes – drums
- Wayne Jackson – trombone, trumpet
- Darin James – drums
- Andrew Love – tenor saxophone
- Steve Potts – drums
- Dave Smith – bass
- James Solberg – guitar
- Rick Steff – organ, piano
- Mike Vlahakis – organ, piano

Production

- Produced by Jim Gaines

== Chart positions ==
| Year | Chart | Position |
|---|---|---|
| 1997 | Billboard Top Blues Albums | 12 |
