= Blind Mississippi Morris =

American blues musician (born 1955)

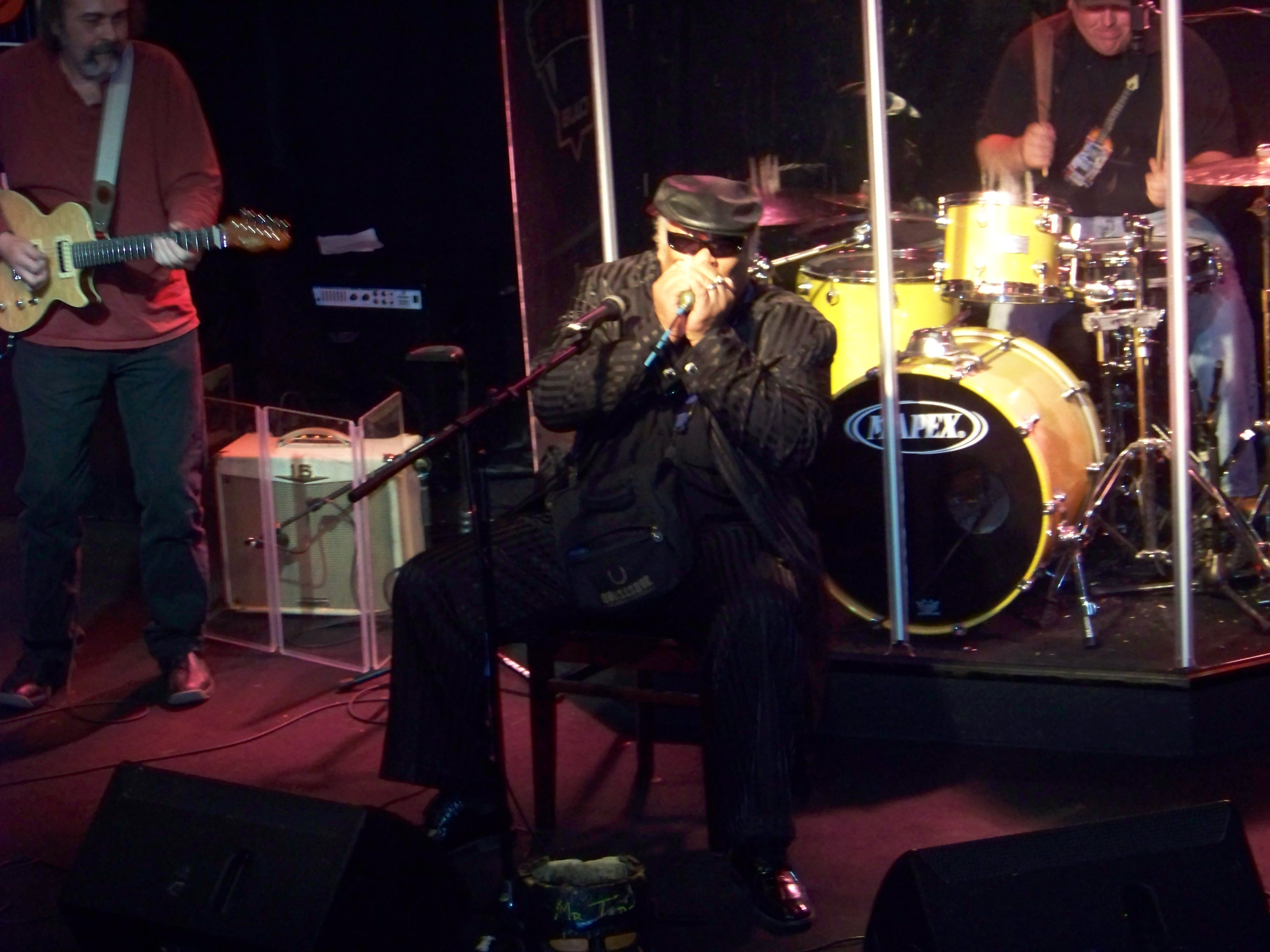
- Blind Mississippi Morris on Beale Street in Memphis, Tennessee

Background information
- Born: Morris Cummings; April 6, 1955 (age 70); Clarksdale, Mississippi, United States
- Genres: Blues, blues rock
- Occupations: Musician, singer
- Instruments: Vocals, harmonica, guitar
- Years active: Late 1970s–present
- Labels: Icehouse Records
- Website: myspace.com/blindmississippimorris

Blind Mississippi Morris (born Morris Cummings; April 6, 1955 in Clarksdale, Mississippi, United States) is an American blues musician.

== Life and career ==
Cummings became blind at the age of four, a victim of congenital glaucoma. Morris became a solo blues performer on Beale Street, and his current backing band is called the Pocket Rockets.

Morris comes from a musical background; his cousins, Robert and Mary Diggs, led the Memphis Sheiks, while his aunt, Mary Tanner, played with the Harps of Melody. Morris is also a cousin of Willie Dixon. He was named as one of the 10 best harmonica players in the world by Bluzharp magazine.

== Discography ==
Year	Title	Record label	Billing
1995	You Know I Like That	Icehouse Records	Blind Mississippi Morris
1998	Bad to Worse	Boogie Barbecue Music	The Pocket Rockets featuring Blind Mississippi Morris
1999	Back Porch Blues	Mempho	Blind Mississippi Morris and Brad Webb
2003	Along the Blues Highway	Animated Music/Varèse Sarabande Records	Chris Thomas King, Blind Mississippi Morris

== See also ==
- List of blues musicians
