= Lefty Williams (musician) =

American guitarist

Lefty Williams (born Jason Cochise Williams) is a one-armed guitar player from Marietta, Georgia. He was born on August 21, 1974, with an incomplete right arm. He performs original southern rock and blues music throughout the United States of America. He also works internationally to assist other disabled persons who want to play the guitar, customizing picks and consulting on technical issues in playing that are confronted by those with only one arm.

Lefty has played guitar since childhood and played guitar in various bands during his teenage years. His first solo project was Nothing Simple (2000–2004). The subsequent Lefty Williams Band released three albums, Big Plans (2005) and Snake Oil (2009), and "All In" (EP). "All In" was recorded at Tree Sound Studios. The first two albums were recorded by John Keane and Snake Oil was nominated by the Homegrown Music Network for "2009 Album of the Year." Lefty won in the category of Best Rock Male at the 2015 Georgia Music Awards.

In 2016 Lefty stopped touring on a full-time basis and opened Williams AV & Security. He designed and installed custom high-end electronics systems, including home theaters, whole house audio, computer networks, and smart home automation systems.

In 2024 Lefty won a Danny Award, recognizing his accomplishments as a disabled musician. In that same year, he co-founded the band Iron Rain, in which he performs as a guitarist and lead vocalist.
