= Chris Beard (singer) =

American songwriter (born 1957)

- Also known as: Prince of the Blues
- Born: August 29, 1957 (age 68); Rochester, New York, U.S.
- Genres: Electric blues
- Occupations: Singer, guitarist, songwriter
- Instruments: Guitar, vocals
- Years active: 1970s–present
- Labels: JSP, NorthernBlues, Electro Glide, Destin Records
- Website: chrisbeardmusic.com

Chris Beard (born August 29, 1957) is an American electric blues singer, guitarist, and songwriter. He has released six albums as of 2023, the first of which was nominated for a Blues Music Award. He is dubbed the 'Prince of the Blues'.

== Life and career ==
Beard was born in Rochester, New York, United States, the son of Joe Beard, a local blues musician. Inspired by Buddy Guy and Matt Murphy, Beard quickly graduated from learning to play the guitar to performing with a local rhythm and blues group by his mid-teens. He played alongside his father before forming his own group after his graduation. Beard played in the blues clubs around his home state for almost twenty years.

Beard's debut album was Barwalkin', issued by JSP in June 1997. Produced by Johnny Rawls, it garnered Beard a nomination for a Blues Music Award for 'Best New Blues Artist'. In 1999, Blues Beat magazine gave Beard the Muddy Waters Award as the 'New Talent of the Year'. A further album, Born to Play the Blues, followed in April 2001, and then Live Wire (2005). Referring to the latter, the AllMusic journalist, Chris Nickson, stated "Beard cements his stature with this record, and sets himself up to take a place among the contemporary blues guitar greats.

Beard has appeared at the Boundary Waters Blues Festival.

In August 2010, Beard released Who I Am and What I Do on Electro Glide Records. The album contained three tracks Beard co-wrote with Ronnie Baker Brooks.

== Discography ==
Year	Title	Record label
1997	Barwalkin'	JSP
2001	Born to Play the Blues	JSP
2005	Live Wire	NorthernBlues
2010	Who I Am and What I Do	Electro Glide
2015	Eye of the Witch	Destin Records
2023	Pass It On Down	Blue Heart Records

== See also ==
- List of electric blues musicians
