= Ronnie Baker Brooks =

American blues guitarist, singer and songwriter

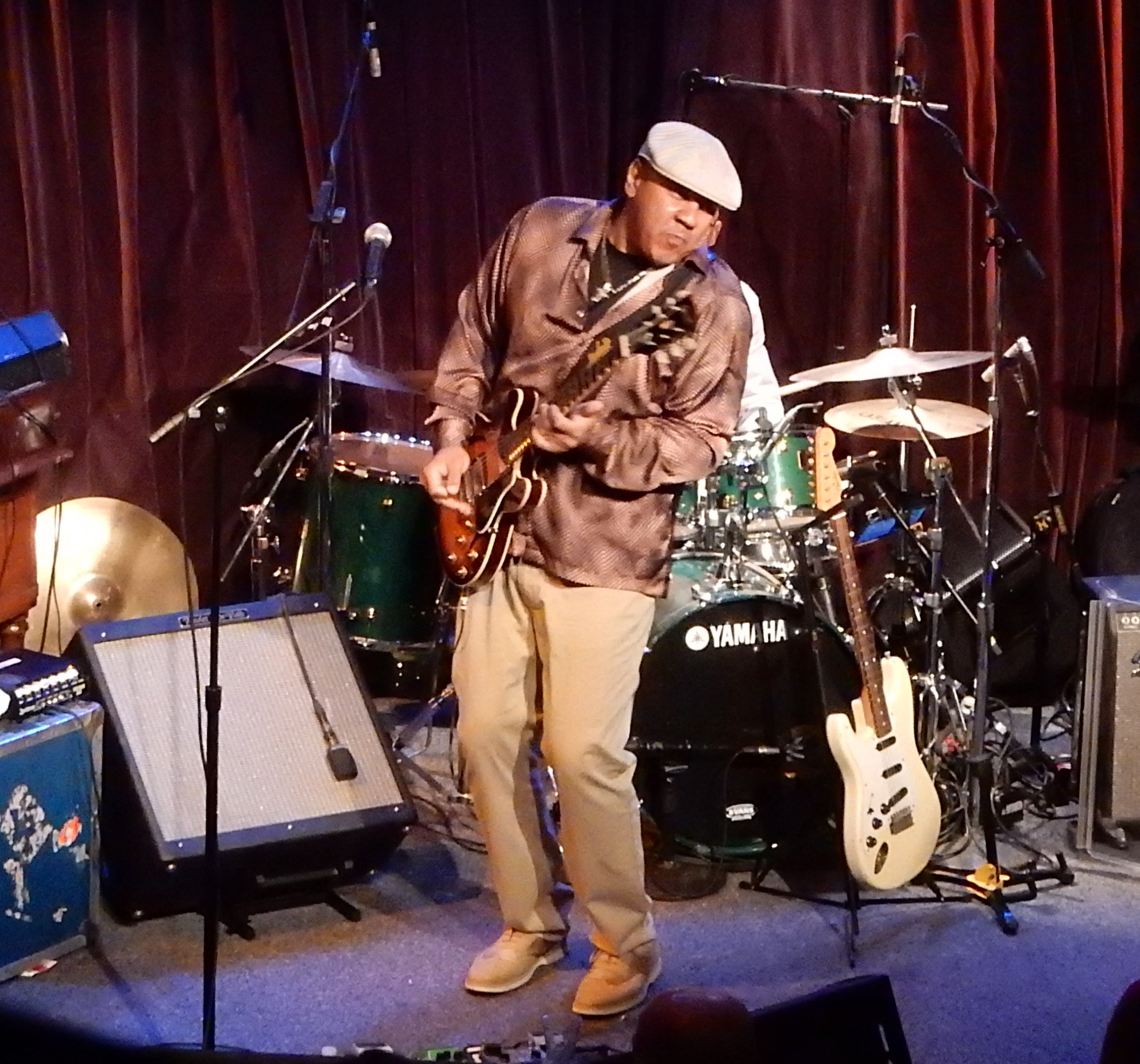

Background information
- Birth name: Rodney Dion Baker
- Born: January 23, 1967 (age 58); Chicago, Illinois, United States
- Genres: Chicago blues, soul blues, electric blues
- Occupation(s): Guitarist, singer, songwriter
- Instrument(s): Guitar, vocals
- Years active: 1970s–present
- Labels: Watchdog Records, Provogue, Alligator
- Website: http://www.ronniebakerbrooks.com

Ronnie Baker Brooks (born January 23, 1967) is an American Chicago blues and soul blues guitarist, singer and songwriter. He was a respected club performer in Chicago, even before recording three solo albums for Watchdog Records. The son of fellow Chicago blues musician Lonnie Brooks, he is the brother of another blues guitarist, Wayne Baker Brooks.

AllMusic journalist, Andy Whitman, described Brooks as "... a better than average soul singer, a fine blues interpreter, and a monster guitarist with an ample supply of technique and passion."

== Life and career ==
He was born Rodney Dion Baker in Chicago, Illinois, United States.

At the age of nine, he first appeared on stage playing guitar alongside his father. In 1985, he graduated from Hales Franciscan High School. He learned to play bass guitar and joined his father's band in 1986. He played guitar on his father's live album, Live from Chicago: Bayou Lightning Strikes, released by Alligator Records in 1988. He was then part of Alligator Records' 20th Anniversary Tour, performing alongside Koko Taylor, Elvin Bishop, and Lil' Ed Williams.

By 1998, Brooks was pursuing a solo career. His debut album, Golddigger, was released the same year by the Watchdog label. It was produced by Janet Jackson. He was nominated for a Blues Music Award in 2000 for Best New Artist. His second album, Take Me Witcha, was released in May 2001.

Brooks next album was The Torch (2006). The Boston Herald described it as "ferocious and unrelenting, The Torch may be the year's best blues album." The album included contributions from Lonnie Brooks, Eddy Clearwater, Jimmy Johnson, Willie Kent, and Al Kapone and was produced by Jellybean Johnson. From 2007 to 2010, Brooks toured with band members Carlton Armstrong, C.J. Anthony Tucker, and Steve Nixon, to support The Torch. On occasions when his younger brother, Wayne Baker Brooks, joined him and his father on stage, they were billed as the Brooks Family Band.

Brooks played at the Notodden Blues Festival in 2007 and at Memphis in May and the Musikfest in 2009. In August 2010, he co-wrote three tracks with Chris Beard for the latter's Who I Am and What I Do, released by Electro Glide Records.

In 2012, the blues journalist David Brais declared Brooks "blues royalty", stating that "his particular style of Chicago blues has been performed on stages around the world. It honors the true torch bearers of this unique sound which includes Willie Dixon, Buddy Guy, B.B. King, Luther Allison and his father."

Times Have Changed was released in January 2017.

His latest album Blues in My DNA, was released on October 11, 2024. It was his Alligator Records debut. He won a Blues Music Award for 'Song of the Year' for that album's title track, along with two further such awards for 'Contemporary Blues Album of the Year' and, in his own name, as the 'Contemporary Blues Male Artist of the Year'.

Brooks lives in Dolton, Illinois, and when he is not touring, he is a regular performer at the Odyssey East Lounge on Chicago's South Side.

== Discography ==
Year	Title	Record label
1998	Golddigger	Watchdog Records
2001	Take Me Witcha	Watchdog Records
2006	The Torch	Watchdog Records
2017	Times Have Changed	Provogue
2024	Blues in My DNA	Alligator

== See also ==
- List of Chicago blues musicians
- List of electric blues musicians
