= Kelly Richey =

American singer (born 1962)

- Born: November 30, 1962 (age 63); Lexington, Kentucky, U.S.
- Genres: Blues
- Instrument: Guitar
- Years active: 1986–present
- Label: Sweet Lucy
- Website: KellyRichey.com

Kelly Richey (born November 30, 1962) is an American blues rock guitarist, singer and composer based out of Cincinnati, Ohio.

== Early life ==
Kelly Richey was born and raised in Lexington, Kentucky, United States, in a conservative Christian household that avoided rock music. Her first instrument was the piano. Her second instrument was a drum kit that her neighbor let her take home. After a couple of months of playing drums in her bedroom, her father offered to buy her anything she wanted; she chose the guitar. She started learning guitar at age 15; she reached a point where she was practicing 12 hours a day.

== Career ==
Kelly Richey joined Stealin Horses, Kopana Terry, Kiya Heartwoodin 1986. In 1988 she played with Albert King at the Cuckoo Nest in Nashville. In 1990, she formed The Kelly Richey Band (KRB). In 1997 she moved from Lexington, Kentucky to Mount Auburn, Cincinnati. Writing of her 2001 album Sending Me Angels, Guitar Player praised her "fiery solos" and her "fast, powerful picking hand", which she credited to having played as a drummer. She cites Roy Buchanan as an influence, besides Stevie Ray Vaughan, Jimi Hendrix and Lonnie Mack. She released eleven albums between 1994 and 2008. Her 2006 album Speechless consisted entirely of instrumentals. She took a break from performing in 2010.

== Equipment ==
Richey plays a 1965 Fender Stratocaster, the same she has played since the 1980s. It has a 1963 body and a 1965 neck, with a traditional Fender tremolo; the pickups are Seymour Duncan and she uses SIT strings (.10-.046). She plays through a Fender Super Reverb with an Ibanez Tube Screamer.

== Discography ==
- 1994: Sister's Gotta Problem
- 1995: The Blues Don't Lie
- 1996: Live at Tommy's On Main
- 1997: Eyes of a Woman
- 1998: Dig a Little Deeper
- 1999: Kelly Richey Band Live
- 2001: Sending Me Angels
- 2003: Kelly Richey Live...As It Should Be
- 2004: Kelly Richey Live
- 2006: Speechless
- 2007: The Kelly Richey Band Live at the Thirsty Ear
- 2008: Carry the Light
- 2013: Sweet Spirit
- 2014: Live at the Blue Wisp
