= Reggie Sears =

American singer-songwriter

Reggie King Sears
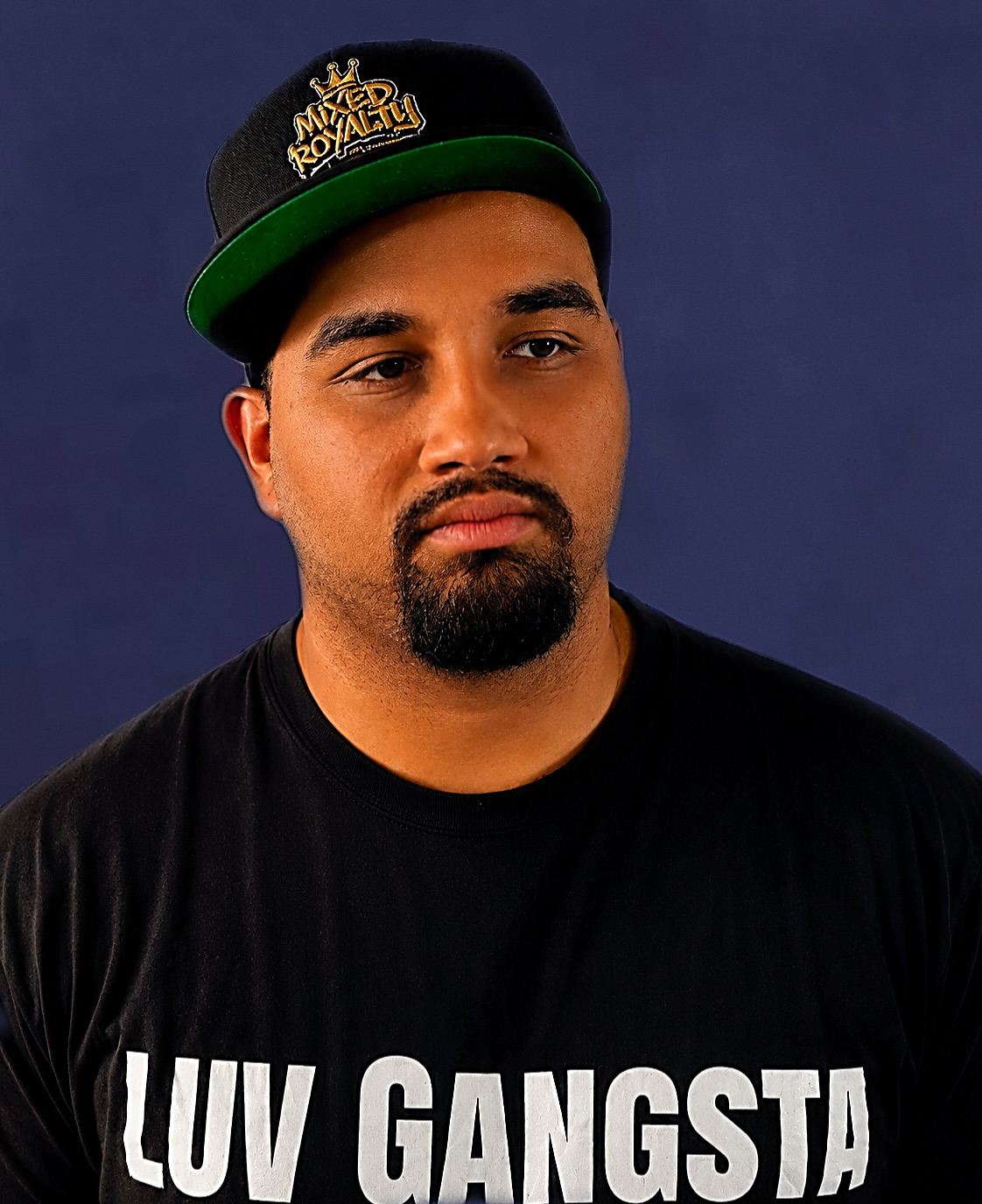
- Reggie King Sears, American Southern Soul and Contemporary R&B artist

Background information
- Born: Reggie Sears; April 12, 1991 (age 35); Fort Lauderdale, Florida, United States
- Genres: Contemporary R&B, Southern soul, Neo-soul, Urban adult contemporary, Soul
- Occupations: Singer-songwriter, musician, record producer
- Instruments: Vocals, guitar, bass, keyboards, drums
- Years active: 2002–present
- Labels: Redd Dawg Records (former), Independent
- Website: www.reggiekingsears.com

Reggie King Sears (born April 12, 1991) is an American Contemporary R&B singer-songwriter, multi-instrumentalist, and record producer. His self-described style, known as 'Ghetto Soul', fuses Urban contemporary R&B, modern Southern soul, gospel, neo soul, and Southern hip-hop. He gained underground attention with the 2011 single, "Dirty Dancer", 2010’s "You Betrayed Me" and 2026’s live favorite "Luv Gangsta". In 2025, he announced he is working on new album Crowned and Dangerous.

== Early life ==
Reggie King Sears was born on April 12, 1991, in Fort Lauderdale, Florida, United States.

Sears began playing guitar and singing at an early age, citing Gerald Levert as his primary influence and Bobby Womack as an additional influence.

By age 12, in the early 2000s, he was performing publicly and appeared at the 17th Annual Fort Lauderdale Sound Advice Blues Festival, performing alongside Fruteland Jackson, Michael Burks, and Solomon Burke. Burke later took an interest in Sears’ development and offered guidance, and subsequently gave him the nickname “King,” which Sears adopted as part of his professional name.

During this period, Sears shared stages with artists such as B. B. King, Buddy Guy, and The Temptations. Sears was also mentored by Marvin Sease.

== Career ==
=== Debut album: Transitions ===
Sears' first album Transitions, a jazz-rock influenced collection of classic and obscure blues covers, was released in September 2005. He began touring in support of Transitions, which led to appearances at Sarasota Blues Fest in Sarasota, Florida; Skippers Smokehouse in Tampa, Florida, House of Blues in Orlando, and On the Waterfront in Rockford, Illinois,

=== Southern Soul, Florida Style ===
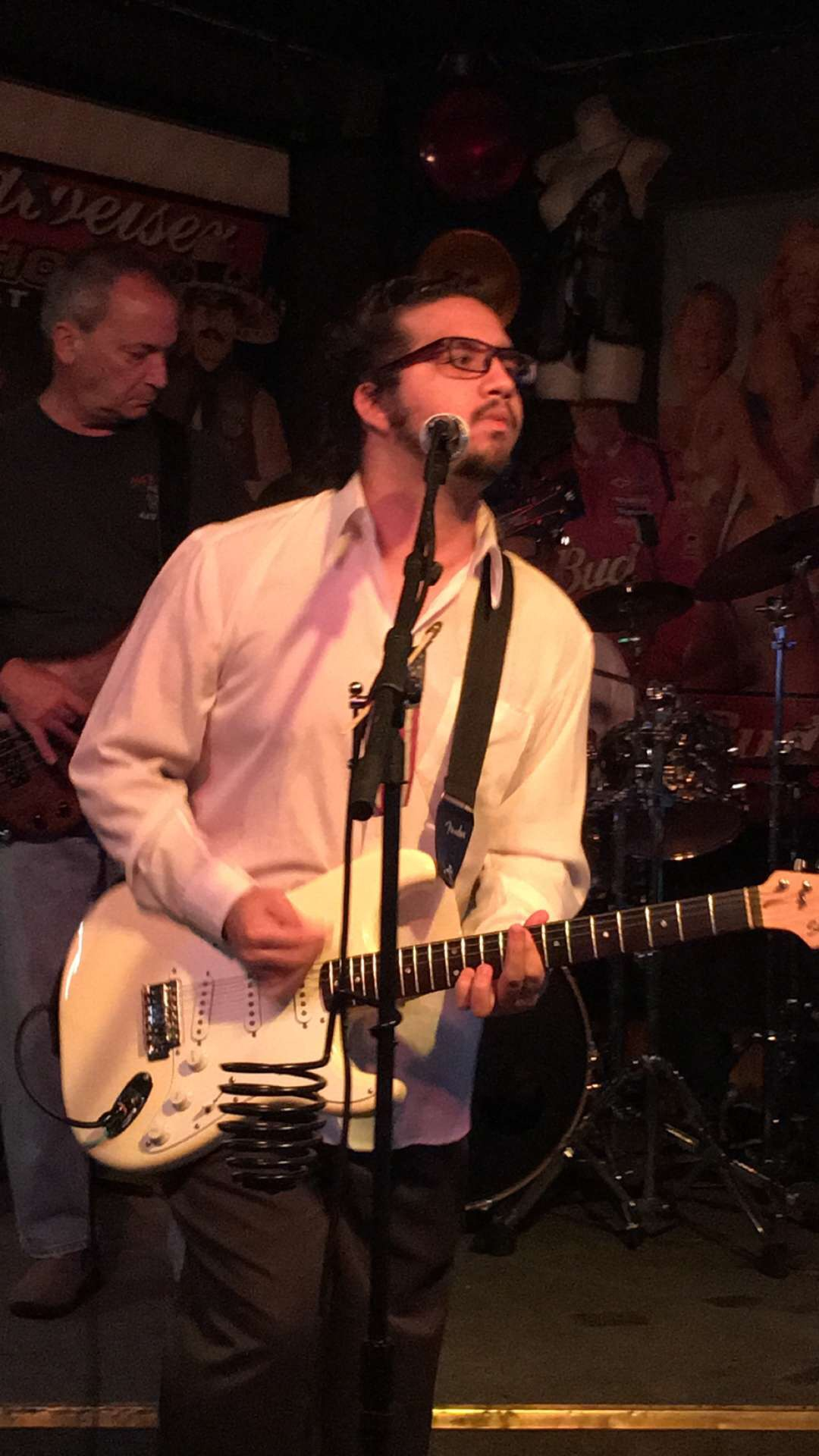
Reggie Sears performing live in 2016

In late 2006, Sears released his third album, Southern Soul, Florida Style.

The release marked a transition in his musical direction. Earlier that year, Sears began incorporating Southern Soul material into his live performances. Following a national tour, he announced that he was leaving the blues genre to pursue Southern Soul and released ‘‘Southern Soul, Florida Style’’ as his first album in the genre.

His fourth album, ‘‘Get Up on It’’, was released in 2007. ‘‘Shades of Blue’’ described the release as showing Sears “moving into more R&B pastures” while retaining elements of Southern Soul.

In 2010, Sears won a Soul Patrol "best of" in the Slow Jam category for his digital single "You Betrayed Me". In November of that year he released "Dirty Dancer". Sears was nominated for Soul Blues Music Award for "Best New Artist".

=== So Many Roads ===
Sears released the single "Can't Get You Out of My System" in early 2011. In 2012, he released "With Every Beat of My Heart". In 2015, he opened for Timmy Thomas.

=== Gear ===
Sears plays a Gibson B.B. King Lucille Signature ES-335, an assortment of Squier Stratocasters, an Epiphone Les Paul, Epiphone SG, and a few Harmony electric guitars. He is best known for playing the Fender Buddy Guy Stratocaster, a guitar he has owned since he was 12 years old. He plays through an amp chain of a Fender Hot Rod Deville, Marshall JCM 2000 and a Dean Markley K-20 amp to get his sound.

== Discography ==
=== Albums ===
- Transitions (2005)
- Blues Power (2006)
- Southern Soul, Florida Style (2006)
- Get Up on It (2007)

=== Singles ===
- "Mellow Down Easy" (2005)
- "Crosscut Saw" (2005)
- "I Had My Chance" (2005)
- "Show Me What You're Working With" (2006)
- "Back That Thang Up" (2007)
- "Sweet Thang" (2007)
- "Dip My Dipper" (2007)
- "She Made A Freak Out of Me" (2007)
- "You Caught Me with My Drawers Off" (2008)
- "Bounce That Booty" (2009)
- "Prisoner of Love" (2009)
- "I Can't Find A Love" (2009)
- "Bigg Poppa" (2010)
- "You Betrayed Me" (2010)
- "Dirty Dancer" (2010)
- "Can't Get You Out of My System" (2011)
- "With Every Beat of My Heart" (2012)
