= Blast Furnace Blues Festival =

Music festival in Pennsylvania, United States

Coordinates: 40.61483°N 75.36762°W

- Genre: Bluegrass, Blues, Blues Rock, Electric Blues, Gospel, R&B, Roots Music, Soul, Zydeco
- Dates: Dates vary by year
- Locations: Bethlehem, Pennsylvania, U.S.
- Years active: 2011–2012, 2014-19, 2021-present
- Founders: ArtsQuest
- Website: Official website

The Blast Furnace Blues Festival is a blues music festival held annually in Bethlehem, Pennsylvania. The Blast Furnace Blues Festival was founded to showcase contemporary and traditional blues, acoustic and electric blues, soul, zydeco and gospel music. Performers have included national recording artists as well as local and regional performers.

The festival began in 2011.

No festival was held in 2013 nor 2020.
