= King Biscuit Blues Festival =

Annual American blues festival held in Arkansas

- Genre: Blues
- Locations: Helena, Arkansas, United States
- Coordinates: 34.5237°N 90.5865°W
- Years active: 1986-2019, 2021-
- Website: King Biscuit Blues Festival website

The King Biscuit Blues Festival is an annual, multi-day blues festival, held in Helena, Arkansas, United States.

== History ==
The name of the festival comes from King Biscuit Time, which was the longest running radio show. Sonny Boy Williamson II and other musicians played live on KFFA every weekday, pausing for King Biscuit flour commercials and announcements of their next night time performances. Jim O'Neal, the editor of Living Blues magazine at the time and an authority on blues history, said, "The King Biscuit hour was the thing that really crystallized blues music in this area. Muddy Waters and B.B. King would come home from working in the fields every day just to listen to the King Biscuit hour. The festival was temporarily renamed Arkansas Blues and Heritage Festival from 2005 to 2010 due to problems arising out of rights of the name.

The festival was started in 1986 under the guidance of the "Main Street Helena" organization, which is part of the "Main Street, USA" program. Its purpose was to revitalize the downtown area of the Mississippi River port city. Lonnie Shields appeared at the inaugural festival.

There was no festival in 2020.

== See also ==
- List of blues festivals
- List of folk festivals
