= List of blues rock musicians =

The following is a list of notable blues rock bands and musicians.

Blues rock is a subgenre of rock which developed in the late-1960s and which emphasizes the traditional, three-chord blues song and instrumental improvisation. The first original blues rock artists such as Cream, the Paul Butterfield Blues Band and Canned Heat actually borrowed the idea of combining an instrumental combo with loud amplification from rock and roll, and also attempted to play long, involved improvisations which were commonplace on jazz records and live blues shows. As blues rock gained popularity, bands that followed immediately were louder and more riff-oriented, giving birth to both heavy metal and Southern rock, which both used basic blues riffs and featured extended solos. In the early 1970s, the lines between blues rock and hard rock were barely visible, as bands including ZZ Top began recording rock-oriented albums that tended to obscure their blues roots. However, blues rock soon distinguished itself from hard rock and acts continued to play or rewrite blues standards, as well as write their own songs in the same idiom. In the 1980s and 1990s, blues rock was more roots-oriented than in the 1960s and 1970s, even when artists such as the Fabulous Thunderbirds and Stevie Ray Vaughan flirted with rock stardom.

Solo artists are listed alphabetically by last name, and groups are listed alphabetically by the first letter (not including the prefix "the", "a" or "an").

== A ==
- AC/DC
- Aerosmith
- Bernard Allison
- The Allman Brothers Band
- Devon Allman
- Duane Allman
- Gregg Allman
- Laith Al-Saadi
- American Blues
- Jake Andrews
- The Animals
- The Answer
- Arc Angels
- The Ardells
- Gwyn Ashton
- Atomic Rooster
- The Aynsley Dunbar Retaliation

== B ==
- The Band
- Bachman–Turner Overdrive
- Back Door Slam
- Bad Company
- Ginger Baker
- Long John Baldry
- Band of Skulls
- The Barons
- Lou Ann Barton
- Jeff Beck
- Duster Bennett
- Beware of Darkness
- Big Brother and the Holding Company
- Billy Thorpe & the Aztecs
- Elvin Bishop
- The Black Crowes
- The Black Keys
- Blind Faith
- Black Sabbath
- Blodwyn Pig
- Mike Bloomfield
- Blue Cheer
- The Blue Van
- The Blues Band
- The Blues Project
- Blues Traveler
- Joe Bonamassa
- Graham Bond
- Deborah Bonham
- Jean-Paul Bourelly
- Box of Frogs
- Doyle Bramhall II
- The Brew
- Roy Buchanan
- Paul Butterfield
- Butts Band

== C ==
- Cactus
- J. J. Cale
- Canned Heat
- Captain Beefheart
- Tommy Castro
- Nathan Cavaleri
- Yavuz Çetin
- Sean Chambers
- Chickasaw Mudd Puppies
- Chicken Shack
- Chris Robinson Brotherhood
- Cinderella
- Eric Clapton
- Gary Clark, Jr.
- Climax Blues Band
- Clutch
- Joe Cocker
- Colin Dussault's Blues Project
- Jamie N Commons
- Joanna Connor
- Ry Cooder
- Kevin Coyne
- Papa John Creach
- Cream
- Creedence Clearwater Revival
- Cuby + Blizzards
- Cui Jian
- Shannon Curfman

== D ==
- The Dead Weather
- Deap Vally
- Deep Purple
- Derek and the Dominos
- The Derek Trucks Band
- Rick Derringer
- Dion
- Dire Straits
- The Doors
- Double Trouble
- Chris Duarte

== E ==
- Eddie and the Hot Rods
- Electric Flag
- Elf
- The Elvin Bishop Group
- Endless Boogie

== F ==
- The Fabulous Thunderbirds
- Faces
- Fleetwood Mac
- Foghat
- Guy Forsyth
- Free
- Dana Fuchs

== G ==
- Eric Gales
- Rory Gallagher
- Lowell George
- David Gerald
- Gov't Mule
- Grace Potter and the Nocturnals
- Grand Funk Railroad
- Grateful Dead
- Great White
- Peter Green
- The Greenhornes
- The Groundhogs
- Gugun Blues Shelter
- Guns N' Roses

== H ==
- The Hamsters
- Don "Sugarcane" Harris
- Beth Hart
- Warren Haynes
- Jeff Healey
- Heartless Bastards
- Jimi Hendrix
- Taylor Hicks
- Dave Hole
- Honeytribe
- Hoodoo Rhythm Devils
- Hot Tuna
- House of Freaks
- Humble Pie

== J ==
- The J. Geils Band
- Colin James
- JD & the Straight Shot
- Jeff Beck Group
- Jethro Tull
- The Jimi Hendrix Experience
- John Mayer Trio
- Jon Spencer Blues Explosion
- Janis Joplin
- John Mayall & the Bluesbreakers
- Eric Johnson
- Josefus
- Juicy Lucy

== K ==
- Danny Kalb
- Kaleo
- Keef Hartley Band
- Kill It Kid
- B.B. King
- Freddie King
- King King
- Al Kooper
- Alexis Korner

== L ==
- Jonny Lang
- Led Zeppelin
- Alvin Lee
- Left Lane Cruiser
- Aynsley Lister
- Little Feat
- Nils Lofgren
- Los Lonely Boys
- Love Sculpture
- Lynyrd Skynyrd

== M ==
- Lonnie Mack
- Wolf Mail
- Mama Lion
- Manal
- Harvey Mandel
- John Mayall
- John Mayer
- Delbert McClinton
- Tony McPhee
- The Midnight Ghost Train
- Buddy Miles
- Steve Miller
- Molly Hatchet
- Gary Moore
- Ian Moore
- Mike Morgan
- Mother Superior
- Mountain
- Moving Sidewalks
- Muddy Waters
- The Muggs
- Mythology

== N ==
- The Neats
- The Norman Beaker Band
- North Mississippi Allstars
- The Numbers Band

== O ==
- Omar & the Howlers
- Joan Osborne

== P ==
- Pacific Gas & Electric
- The Pack A.D.
- Jimmy Page
- Robert Palmer (singer)
- The Peter Parcek 3
- The Paul Butterfield Blues Band
- Popa Chubby
- Ana Popović
- Duffy Power
- Tom Principato
- Pure Food and Drug Act

== R ==
- The Raconteurs
- Radio Moscow
- Bonnie Raitt
- The Record Company
- Chris Rea
- The Red Devils
- Keith Richards
- Rising Sons
- Rival Sons
- Robert Bradley's Blackwater Surprise
- Paul Rodgers
- The Rolling Stones
- Rose Hill Drive
- Rose Tattoo
- The Rounders
- Royal Southern Brotherhood

== S ==
- Saint Lu
- Santana
- Eric Sardinas
- Savoy Brown
- Matt Schofield
- Charlie Sexton
- The Sheepdogs
- Kenny Wayne Shepherd
- Skid Row
- The Snowdroppers
- Soledad Brothers
- Soulmate
- Spooky Tooth
- Status Quo
- Steamhammer
- The Steepwater Band
- The Stone Foxes
- Storyville
- The Strypes

== T ==
- Taste
- Joanne Shaw Taylor
- Tedeschi Trucks Band
- Ten Years After
- Jimmy Thackery
- Them
- Thin Lizzy
- George Thorogood
- Pat Travers
- Treat Her Right
- Triggerfinger
- Walter Trout
- Robin Trower
- Derek Trucks
- Duke Tumatoe

== V ==
- Javier Vargas
- Jimmie Vaughan
- Stevie Ray Vaughan

== W ==
- Joe Walsh
- Warumpi Band
- Welshly Arms
- When Rivers Meet
- Jack White
- Snowy White
- The White Stripes
- Whitesnake
- Chris Whitley
- David Wilcox
- Edgar Winter
- Johnny Winter
- Steve Winwood
- Wishbone Ash
- Ronnie Wood

== Y ==
- The Yardbirds

== Z ==
- Zephyr
- ZZ Top
