= Groovefest American Music Festival =

Coordinates: 37°40′54″N 113°03′40″W

Groovefest Music & Art Festival - formerly Groovefest American Music Festival
- Dates: 4th weekend in June
- Locations: Cedar City, Utah, United States
- Years active: 2001–2019, 2021-
- Website: www.groovefestutah.com

Groovefest Music & Art Festival - formerly Groovefest American Music Festival is a multi-day music festival held in Cedar City, Utah, United States. Founded by Tim Cretsinger, the festival is held each year during the final week of June. It is a seven-day festival that is dedicated to American music, with genres including blues and folk, bluegrass, country, Americana, and jazz.

Past notable artists have included Trampled by Turtles, Pert Near Sandstone, Richmond Fontaine, Great American Taxi, 56 Hope Road, Bastard Sons of Johnny Cash, Cee Cee James, Stranger, Harper & Midwest Kind, Wayne "The Train" Hancock, Jackstraw.

The Groovefest went virtual in 2020.

== 2015 line-up ==
- Banditos
- Big Wild Wings
- Cale Tyson
- CAVE Women
- Chikano
- Jeffrey Halford & the Healers
- Erin harpe & the Delta Swingers
- Fernando Viciconte
- The Indulgers
- Melanie Davaney
- Mustered Courage
- The Naked Waiters
- Ragged Union
- Sammy Brue
- Way Down Wanderers

== 2014 line-up ==
- WILHELM (Cedar City, UT)
- LOVES IT (Austin, TX)
- BOTTLED MONKEY (Cedar City, UT)
- BLAMMITY BLAM (Cedar City, UT)
- SCREEN DOOR PORCH (Jackson Hole, WY)
- THE GOOD LUCK THRIFT STORE OUTFIT (Oakdale, CA)
- Harper & Midwest Kind (Michigan)
- STRANGER (San Diego, CA)
- JASON TYLER BURTON (Springdale, UT)
- ALICE WALLACE (Fullerton, CA)
- POEINA SUDDARTH (Los Angeles, CA)
- STEPH JOHNSON TRIO (South Park, CA)
- THE WARREN G. HARDINGS (Seattle, WA)
- FELIX Y LOS GATOS (Albuquerque, NM)
- BLAIR CRIMMINS & THE HOOKERS (Atlanta, GA)
- CEE CEE JAMES (Portland, OR)

== 2013 line-up ==
- AfroZep
- Otter Creek
- Loose Connection
- Victor & Penny
- D. Bess
- Woody Pines
- Levee Town
- Swamp Cabbage
- Rian Basilio & the Roosters
- Courtney Marie Andrews
- Melody & Tyler
- Water Tower
- Bila Gaana
- Dirty Bourbon River Show
- Contino
- Ned Evett and Triple Double

== 2012 line-up ==
- Claudia Russell & Bruce Kaplan (2005)
- Nicole Campbell (2004)
- Kate Macleod (2007)
- Pete Anderson (2005)
- Nowhere Man & a Whiskey Girl (2008)
- Shawn Rohlf & The Buskers (2004)
- Sister Wives (2004)
- Chicago Afrobeat Project (2008)
- John Batdorf (2010)
- Hymn for Her (2011)
- Trevor Green (2010)
- Jackstraw (2003)
- Traveler (2010)
- Antioquia (2011)
- Bastard Sons of Johnny Cash (2005)
- Todd Wolfe Band (2008)
- Thrift Store Cowboys (2007)
- Karyn Whittemore (2005)
