= Rounder =

Rounder(s) or The Rounder(s) may refer to:

== Film and television ==
- The Rounders (1914 film), American two-reel silent comedy with Charlie Chaplin
- The Rounder, 1930 American two-reel comedy in Jack Benny filmography
- The Rounders (1965 film), American Western comedy
- The Rounders (TV series), 1966–67 American sitcom based on 1965 film
- Rounders (film), 1998 American drama about high-stakes poker

== Music ==
- The Holy Modal Rounders, American folk music duo formed in 1963, a/k/a The Rounders
- Rounder Records, American label founded in 1970
- The Rounders (band), American rock group formed in 2000
- The Rounder Girls, Austrian trio competing in Eurovision Song Contest 2000

== Sports and games ==
- Rounders, bat-and-ball game played in England since Tudor era
- Rounder, see glossary of poker terms
- Rounder, see Glossary of bets offered by UK bookmakers
