= Steppin' Out =

Steppin' Out or Stepping Out may refer to:

== Film and theatre ==
- Stepping Out (1919 film), an American silent drama film directed by Fred Niblo
- Steppin' Out (1925 film), an American silent comedy film directed by Frank R. Strayer
- Stepping Out (1931 film), an American farce directed by Charles Reisner
- Stepping Out (1980 film), a 1980 Australian documentary film by Chris Noonan
- Stepping Out (play), a 1984 play by Richard Harris
  - Stepping Out (1991 film), an American musical comedy adaptation of the Harris play, starring Liza Minnelli

== Music ==
=== Albums ===
- Steppin' Out (Herb Alpert album), 2013
- Steppin' Out (Joan Armatrading album), 1979 live album
- Steppin' Out (Tony Bennett album), 1993
- Steppin' Out (Eric Clapton album), 1981 compilation
- Steppin' Out (Cleopatra album), 2000
- Stepping Out (Red Garland album), 1981
- Steppin' Out (Gospel Hummingbirds album), 1992
- Steppin' Out (High Inergy album)' 1978
- Steppin' Out (George Howard album) or the title song, 1984
- Stepping Out (Diana Krall album), 1993
- Stepping Out (Steve Laury album) or the title song, 1990
- Steppin' Out (Jack McDuff album), 1969
- Steppin' Out (Neil Sedaka album) or the title song, 1976
- Steppin' Out!, by Harold Vick, or the title song, 1963
- Steppin' Out with the Grateful Dead: England '72, 2002
- Stepping Out: The Very Best of Joe Jackson, 1990 compilation
- Steppin' Out - The Collection, by Joe Jackson, 2013
- Steppin' Out, by Daryl Stuermer, 1988
- Steppin' Out, by Gary Stewart, 1976
- Steppin' Out, by Mike Fahn, 1989
- Steppin' Out, by the Osmonds, 1979

=== Songs ===
- "Steppin' Out" (instrumental), by Memphis Slim, 1959; covered by Eric Clapton
- "Steppin' Out" (Joe Jackson song), 1982
- "Steppin' Out" (Kool & the Gang song), 1981
- "Steppin' Out (Gonna Boogie Tonight)", by Tony Orlando and Dawn, 1974
- "Stepping Out", by Bucks Fizz, B-side of the single "If You Can't Stand the Heat", 1982
- "Stepping Out", by the Dictators from Manifest Destiny, 1977
- "Steppin' Out", by Electric Light Orchestra from Out of the Blue, 1977
- "Steppin' (Out)", by the Gap Band from The Gap Band II, 1979
- "Steppin' Out", by Joan Armatrading from Back to the Night, 1975
- "Steppin' Out", by Kaskade from In the Moment, 2004
- "Stepping Out", by Kevin Ayers from As Close as You Think, 1986
- "Steppin' Out", by Paul Revere & the Raiders from Just Like Us!, 1966
- "Steppin' Out (Pt. 1)" and "Steppin' Out (Pt. 2)", by Evelyn King from Music Box, 1979
- "Steppin' Out with My Baby", by Irving Berlin, from the movie Easter Parade, 1948

== Television ==
=== Series ===
- Stepping Out (British TV series), a 2013 competitive dancing show
- Stepping Out (German TV series), a 2015 competitive dancing show
- Stepping Out (Singaporean TV series), a 1999 Mandarin-language drama

=== Episodes ===
- "Steppin' Out", 1977 episode of Laverne & Shirley (season 2)
- "Steppin' Out", 1999 episode of Little Men
- "Steppin' Out", 1985 episode of The New Leave It to Beaver
- "Steppin' Out", 2001 episode of Yu-Gi-Oh! Duel Monsters (season 2)

== See also ==
- "I'm Stepping Out", a song by John Lennon
