= Big Girl Blues =

Studio album by Joanna Connor
- Released: 1996
- Genre: Blues, blues rock
- Label: Blind Pig
- Producer: Joanna Connor

Joanna Connor chronology
Rock & Roll Gypsy (1995)	Big Girl Blues (1996)	Slidetime (1998)

Big Girl Blues is an album by the American musician Joanna Connor, released in 1996. She supported it with a North American tour.

== Production ==
Recorded in Munich, the album was produced by Connor. She was influenced by Taj Mahal to use slide guitar on most of the songs, all of which she wrote. The title track addresses body image issues. "43rd St." is about Connor's days playing in Dion Payton's band. "Sweet Baby" is dedicated to Connor's son. "Smoke It Up" was played in a reggae style.

== Critical reception ==
Professional ratings
Review scores
Source	Rating
All Music Guide to the Blues	4/5 stars
The Boston Phoenix	2.5/4 stars
The Commercial Appeal	3/4 stars
DownBeat	3.5/5 stars
Houston Chronicle	3/5 stars
MusicHound Blues: The Essential Album Guide	4.5/5 stars
The Penguin Guide to Blues Recordings	3/4 stars

The St. Louis Post-Dispatch stated, "Connor plays fast—incredibly fast sometimes—and doesn't leave much white space in her songs. She's definitely nimble, but at the same time sounds good and dirty." Stereo Review concluded that there are times when Connor "recalls both the gut-wrenching and the softas-butter-in-July sides of Janis Joplin." The Sarasota Herald-Tribune dismissed the album as blues rock and urged Connor to "stick to what she does best standard, 8- and 12-bar blues overlaid with a rich, emotionally restrained guitar and a shimmering slide highlights".

The Houston Chronicle noted that the songs "begin to reveal a woman, not just some blues mama acting macho." The Commercial Appeal called the album "lowdown bar blues in the best sense". The Buffalo News listed Big Girl Blues as the third best blues album of 1996; the St. Louis Post-Dispatch listed it as the fifth.

== Track listing ==
No.	Title	Length
1.	"Big Girl Blues"
2.	"43rd St."
3.	"Fly Away"
4.	"They Love Each Other"
5.	"Sweet Baby"
6.	"You Should Be My Lover"
7.	"Sister Spirit"
8.	"You Oughta Know"
9.	"Heart of the Blues"
10.	"Juicy"
11.	"Meditations"
12.	"Smoke It Up"
