= How'd a White Boy Get the Blues? =

Studio album by Popa Chubby
- Released: 2001
- Genre: Blues
- Label: Blind Pig
- Producer: Popa Chubby

Popa Chubby chronology
One Night Live in New York City (1999)	How'd a White Boy Get the Blues? (2001)	Flashed Back (2001)

How'd a White Boy Get the Blues? is an album by the American musician Popa Chubby, released in 2001. It was his first album for Blind Pig Records. Popa Chubby supported the album with a North American tour. The title track was a minor hit in Europe.

== Production ==
The album was produced by Popa Chubby. He played a signature Gibson Flying V, which he chose in tribute to Albert King, as well as a 1966 Stratocaster. He raps on the opening track, "Daddy Played the Guitar and Mama Was a Disco Queen". Popa Chubby played most of the instruments, using samples, sitar, slides, and dobro on the album. He thought that most of the songs described finding sustentation in music. "It's a Sad Day in New York City When There Ain't No Room for the Blues" criticizes NYC mayor Rudy Giuliani for making the city a less diverse place.

== Critical reception ==
Professional ratings
Review scores
Source	Rating
AllMusic	3/5 stars
The Ottawa Citizen	3.5/5 stars
The Penguin Guide to Blues Recordings	3/4 stars
The Press of Atlantic City	3/4 stars
Red Deer Advocate	5/5 stars

Billboard called Popa Chubby "a postmodern bluesman," writing that, "with Chubby, blues is a distinctly urban, free-association groove." The Philadelphia Inquirer wrote that Popa Chubby "melds pungent acoustic blues, fiery blues-rock, horn-kissed soul, rap and electronic touches into the accompaniment for semiautobiographical songs that soulfully explore his passion for the music and the hardships of being a bluesman in the Big Apple."

The Ottawa Citizen said that "Chubby's a slash-and-burn guitar player of the first order." The Press of Atlantic City labeled the album "part Robert Johnson, part Meat Loaf." The Red Deer Advocate praised the "upbeat music and sinister themes." The Buffalo News concluded that the album "erupts from the speakers with all of the visceral power of a present-day Muddy Waters."

AllMusic noted that, "although he's not entirely successful, Popa Chubby hits enough stylistic bases to make this a listenable and often invigorating album which gets extra points for attempting to push past the stereotypical blues clichés and into more experimental waters."

== Track listing ==
No.	Title	Length
1.	"Daddy Played the Guitar and Mama Was a Disco Queen"	4:27
2.	"Black Hearted Woman"	5:17
3.	"Carrying On the Torch of the Blues"	3:37
4.	"Time Is Killing Me"	4:36
5.	"Savin' My Love Up for My Lover"	4:09
6.	"No Comfort"	5:15
7.	"It's a Sad Day in New York City When There Ain't No Room for the Blues"	6:52
8.	"Goin' Down to Willies"	5:11
9.	"Since I Lost My Leg"	8:59
10.	"How'd a White Boy Get the Blues?"	2:49
