= Dion Payton =

American guitarist and singer (1950–2021)

Dion Payton (October 21, 1950 – March 12, 2021) was an American Chicago blues guitarist and singer, who gained popularity in the late 1980s and early 1990s in Chicago clubs.

Payton was born in Greenwood, Mississippi, and gained recording experience at Chess Records with gospel groups such as the Violinaires before touring with Millie Jackson, Albert King and O.V. Wright. He first caught the attention of Alligator Records while playing rhythm guitar and co-arranging Lonnie Brooks's 1983 album, Hot Shot. After leaving Brooks, Payton assembled the 43rd Street Blues Band in 1985, which served as the weekend house band at the blues club Kingston Mines for many years. The band's name referred to the location of the Checkerboard Lounge, where they served as Junior Wells's backing band. Accompanying Payton on rhythm guitar was Joanna Connor. Payton signed a recording contract with Virgin Records but never released any albums with Virgin or other record labels. His only commercial recording is his "All Your Affection Is Gone," from the New Bluebloods compilation album released by Alligator in 1987.

In his later years, Payton performed infrequently in the Chicago area. He died in Chicago.
