= Gas Money =

Gas Money may refer to:

- Gas Money (The Price Is Right), a game on the game show The Price is Right
- Gas Money, Stand Up! Records album SUR058 by Pete Lee
- Gas Money, 1994 album by Popa Chubby
- Freddy's Gas Money Tour, a music tour by Freddy Wexler

== See also ==
- Gas prices (disambiguation)
