= Gang of Outlaws Tour =

2012 concert tour by ZZ Top

- Concert by ZZ Top
- Location: United States
- Associated album: Texicali
- Start date: May 25, 2012
- End date: June 29, 2012
- Legs: 1
- No. of shows: 23
ZZ Top tour chronology
Rebels and Bandoleros Tour (2011)	Gang of Outlaws Tour (2012)	La Futura Tour (2012–14)
3 Doors Down tour chronology
Time of My Life Tour (2011–12)	Gang of Outlaws Tour (2012)
Gretchen Wilson tour chronology
Xtreme Muzik Tour (2011)	Gang of Outlaws Tour (2012)

The Gang of Outlaws Tour was an American concert tour by rock band ZZ Top. Coinciding with their newly released EP Texicali, the tour visited arenas and amphitheaters from May through June 2012, supported by opening acts 3 Doors Down and Gretchen Wilson. The tour's concept was inspired by the concept of cinema and meant to stray from their previous tours, staged as an elaborate multimedia presentation. It made use of cinematic elements to instill the simulation of a feature film to the audience. The stage featured a large video screen that showed visual effects, video clips of attractive women, music videos, song lyrics and live action of the band on stage. Gang of Outlaws and Texicali were central to the group's comeback.

Consisting of 23 shows, Gang of Outlaws began in Manchester, New Hampshire on May 25, 2012, and ended in Hinckley, Minnesota on June 29, 2012. The tour was generally well-received and produced many positive reviews from critics. Despite no sellouts, the show in Estero, Florida was the highest-grossing event, selling over three-thousand tickets. Although none of ZZ Top's newer material was performed, a song from Texicali was added to the set list for the group's next tour in Europe.

== Tour dates ==
List of concerts, showing date, city, country, venue, tickets sold, number of available tickets and amount of gross revenue
Date	City	Country	Venue	Opening Act(s)	Attendance	Revenue
May 25, 2012	Manchester	United States	Verizon Wireless Arena	3 Doors Down, Gretchen Wilson	—N/a	—N/a
May 26, 2012	Atlantic City	United States	Etess Arena	3 Doors Down, Gretchen Wilson	—N/a	—N/a
May 27, 2012	Mashantucket	United States	MGM Grand Theater	3 Doors Down, Gretchen Wilson	—N/a	—N/a
June 1, 2012	Winston-Salem	United States	Joel Coliseum	3 Doors Down, Gretchen Wilson	—N/a	—N/a
June 2, 2012	Fort Bragg	United States	Fort Bragg Fairgrounds (Army Concert Series)	3 Doors Down, Gretchen Wilson	—N/a	—N/a
June 3, 2012	Fredericksburg	United States	Job.com Pavilion (Celebrate Virginia Live)	3 Doors Down, Gretchen Wilson	—N/a	—N/a
June 5, 2012	Glen Allen	United States	SnagAJob.com Pavilion (Innsbrook After Hours)	3 Doors Down, Gretchen Wilson	—N/a	—N/a
June 6, 2012	Simpsonville	United States	Charter Amphitheatre	3 Doors Down, Gretchen Wilson	—N/a	—N/a
June 8, 2012	St. Augustine	United States	St. Augustine Amphitheatre	3 Doors Down	—N/a	—N/a
June 10, 2012	Alpharetta	United States	Verizon Wireless Amphitheatre at Encore Park	3 Doors Down, Gretchen Wilson	—N/a	—N/a
June 12, 2012	Hollywood	United States	Hard Rock Live	3 Doors Down	—N/a	—N/a
June 15, 2012	Estero	United States	Germain Arena	3 Doors Down, Gretchen Wilson	3,160 / 4,914	$168,490
June 16, 2012	Orlando	United States	Universal Music Plaza Stage	3 Doors Down	—N/a	—N/a
June 17, 2012	St. Petersburg	United States	Tropicana Field	3 Doors Down, Gretchen Wilson	—N/a	—N/a
June 19, 2012	Southaven	United States	Snowden Grove Amphitheater	3 Doors Down, Gretchen Wilson	—N/a	—N/a
June 20, 2012	Nashville	United States	Bridgestone Arena	3 Doors Down, Gretchen Wilson	2,766 / 4,474	$154,591
June 22, 2012	Baton Rouge	United States	River Center Arena	3 Doors Down, Gretchen Wilson	—N/a	—N/a
June 23, 2012	The Woodlands	United States	Cynthia Woods Mitchell Pavilion	3 Doors Down, Gretchen Wilson	—N/a	—N/a
June 24, 2012	Dallas	United States	Gexa Energy Pavilion	3 Doors Down, Gretchen Wilson	—N/a	—N/a
June 26, 2012	Des Moines	United States	Wells Fargo Arena	3 Doors Down, Gretchen Wilson	—N/a	—N/a
June 27, 2012	Clarkston	United States	DTE Energy Music Theatre	3 Doors Down, Gretchen Wilson	—N/a	—N/a
June 29, 2012	Hinckley	United States	Grand Casino Hinckley Amphitheater	3 Doors Down, Gretchen Wilson	—N/a	—N/a

== See also ==
- Texicali
- 3 Doors Down
- Gretchen Wilson
