= Electric Chubbyland: Popa Chubby Plays Jimi Hendrix =

Studio album by Popa Chubby
- Released: December 11, 2006
- Recorded: February 10–11, 2006 (Live); 2006 (Studio)
- Genre: Blues rock
- Length: 144:23
- Label: Dixiefrog Records
- Producer: Popa Chubby

Electric Chubbyland: Popa Chubby Plays Jimi Hendrix is a live and studio album by Popa Chubby recorded in tribute to Jimi Hendrix. The concert part was recorded in Middletown, New York at the Corner Stage, February 10–11, 2006. The studio part, recorded in 2006 at the Serpentine Studio in Central Valley, includes "San Catri", an instrumental piece written by Popa Chubby in the style of Jimi Hendrix. The album was re-released in 2007 by Blind Pig Records. It includes "Fire" in place of "Hey Joe". The cover was drawn by the French artist Frédéric Loumagne who plays in Evil Country Jack a surfin'trashmetal band.

== Track listing ==
All songs written by Jimi Hendrix, except where noted.

=== CD 1 (Live) ===
| No. | Title | Length |
|---|---|---|
| 1. | "Intro" | 0:55 |
| 2. | "Spanish Castle Magic" | 5:04 |
| 3. | "Foxy Lady" | 6:20 |
| 4. | "Catfish Blues" (Robert Petway) | 6:00 |
| 5. | "The Wind Cries Mary" | 7:44 |
| 6. | "Purple Haze" | 3:23 |
| 7. | "Can You See Me?" | 5:38 |
| 8. | "Remember" | 3:44 |
| 9. | "Third Stone from the Sun" | 3:37 |

=== CD 2 (Live) ===
| No. | Title | Length |
|---|---|---|
| 1. | "Intro" | 0:55 |
| 2. | "Come On (Part 1)" (Earl King) | 6:36 |
| 3. | "Red House" | 8:59 |
| 4. | "Who Knows" | 6:58 |
| 5. | "Hey Joe" (Billy Roberts) | 11:14 |
| 6. | "Little Wing" | 9:11 |
| 7. | "Voodoo Child (Slight Return)" | 6:05 |

=== CD 3 (Studio) ===
| No. | Title | Length |
|---|---|---|
| 1. | "Manic Depression" | 4:53 |
| 2. | "Up From The Sky" | 7:59 |
| 3. | "I Don't Live Today" | 4:04 |
| 4. | "Izabella" | 4:51 |
| 5. | "Burning of the Midnight Lamp" | 5:28 |
| 6. | "Highway Chile" | 4:27 |
| 7. | "Bold As Love" | 4:14 |
| 8. | "San Catri (For Jimi)" (Popa Chubby) | 16:06 |

== Band ==
- Popa Chubby: vocals, Guitar
- A.J. Pappas: Bass guitar
- Chris Reddan: drums
