= Passion (Steve Laury album) =

Studio album by Steve Laury
- Released: 1991
- Recorded: 1991 at Signature Sound - San Diego, CA
- Genre: Jazz - Smooth Jazz
- Length: 41:48
- Label: Denon Records
- Producer: Steve Laury

Steve Laury chronology
Stepping Out (1990)	Passion (1991)	Keepin' the Faith (1993)

Passion is an album by American guitarist Steve Laury released in 1991, and recorded for Denon Records. The album reached No. 1 on the Billboard, R&R, Gavin, PAC Contemporary Jazz charts.

AllMusic noted that Laury "displays the versatility of a studio musician, ranging from a close Wes Montgomery imitation to hints of rock and funk".

== Track listing ==
(all tracks written by Steve Laury and Ron Satterfield)

1. All The Way - 4:48
2. In My Dreams - 4:30
3. Getaway - 4:50
4. I Need You So - 4:14
5. I Like That - 4:00
6. Come Back To Me - 5:10
7. No Kidding - 4:34
8. Passion - 5:10
9. Jeananne - 4:32

== Personnel ==
- Steve Laury - guitar
- Ron Satterfield - keyboards, bass, vocals, guitar
- Duncan Moore - drums, percussion

== Charts ==
Chart (1991)	Peak position
Billboard Jazz Albums	11
