= International Songwriting Competition =

Annual music contest

The International Songwriting Competition (ISC), founded in 2002, is an annual songwriting contest for both amateur and professional songwriters. There is no physical event to attend as the competition is held online, and anyone in the world can enter. Each year the competition gives away over US$150,000 in cash and prizes, including $25,000 in cash to the overall Grand Prize Winner. Additionally, ISC offers an opportunity for artists to have their songs heard by celebrity artists and music industry executives.

== Overview ==
Depending on the category, submissions are judged on the following criteria:

- Creativity
- Originality
- Lyrics
- Melody
- Arrangement
- Overall likability

There are 24 categories that artists can enter:

- AAA (Adult Album Alternative)
- AC (Adult Contemporary)
- Americana
- Blues
- Children's Music
- Christian,
- Comedy/Novelty
- Country
- EDM (Electronic Dance Music)
- Folk/Singer-Songwriter
- Hip-Hop/Rap
- Instrumental
- Jazz,
- Latin Music
- Lyrics Only
- Music Video
- Performance
- Pop/Top 40
- R&B/Soul
- Rock
- Teen
- Unpublished
- Unsigned
- World Music

== Winners ==
Previous winners of the ISC include:

- Gotye
- David Kushner
- Tones and I
- The Band Perry
- Gregory Porter
- Roman Miroshnichenko
- Faouzia
- Illenium
- Gin Wigmore
- Tom Cardy
- R.LUM.R
- Kate Morgan
- Vance Joy
- Kimbra
- Hattie Oates
- The Teskey Brothers
- Amy Shark
- Altered Five Blues Band
- Ivy-Jane Browne
- Lindsey Stirling
- Passenger
- bodie
- Sophie Hanlon

== Judges ==
The ISC has celebrity judges and high-profile industry executives on the panel. Past and present judges include:

- Mariah Carey
- Gloria Estefan
- Hozier
- Dua Lipa
- Florida Georgia Line
- Linkin Park
- Coldplay
- The Chainsmokers
- Rihanna
- Lorde
- Bastille
- Kristian Bush (Sugarland)
- Femi Kuti
- Jason Mraz
- Waka Flocka Flame
- Armin van Buuren
- Jennifer Hudson
- Paul Stanley (Kiss)

== Unsigned Only ==
Unsigned Only is a sister competition and category to the International Songwriting Competition (ISC), launched in 2012 by the same team that founded ISC. It is an annual international music contest exclusively for artists not signed to major record labels. In fact, ISC introduced an “Unsigned Only” category to provide unsigned songwriters a level playing field within its own contest. Unlike ISC’s focus on songwriting, Unsigned Only spotlights the artists themselves – even allowing cover songs – and aims to discover and mentor new independent talent.

Each year, Unsigned Only awards winners in multiple genre categories (e.g. Rock, Pop, Country, R&B, etc.), as well as an overall Grand Prize known as “Artist of the Year.” Winners share in over $150,000 in cash and prizes, including a $20,000 USD grand prize for the top artist.

=== Winners ===
Previous winners of Unsigned Only include:

- Alicia Enstrom
- Eric Ethridge
- Faouzia
- Marquis Hill
- Lara Johnston
- Orlando Kallen
- Trudy Lynn
- Wes Mack
- AJ Mitchell
- Charlotte Sands
- Tia P.
- Ingrid Andress
- Anna Wolf
- Jared Porter
- Auggie Velarde
- Beddy Rays

=== Judges ===
Notable Unsigned Only judges include:

- Robert Smith (The Cure)
- Aimee Mann
- LeAnn Rimes
- Jill Scott
- Rodney Atkins
- Nancy Wilson
- Nicholas Petricca
- Janiva Magness
- Ruthie Foster
- Evelyn Glennie
- Miles Kane
- Anthony DeCurtis
