= The Gospel Hummingbirds =

The Gospel Hummingbirds are an American gospel music group from Oakland, California.

The group was founded in the 1970s by the father of Joe A. Thomas, who now sings lead vocals and plays bass in the group. They released two albums on Blind Pig Records in the 1990s, one of which (Steppin' Out) was nominated for a Grammy Award for Best Traditional Gospel Album.

== Members ==
- Joe Thomas - (former member, deceased)
- Joe A. Thomas - (former member)
- Roy Tyler - (former member, deceased)
- Josh Lowrey - (former member, deceased)
- Clarence Nichols - (former member, deceased)
- James Gibson, Jr.
- Mark Smith, Sr. - (former member)
- Timothy Bell - (former member)
- Herbert James - (former member)
- Morris LeGrande
- Gerald Dayce
- Charles Holland

== Discography ==
- Route 66 To Heaven (Evans Music, 1981)
- Steppin' Out (Blind Pig Records, 1992)
- Taking Flight (Blind Pig, 1995)
- Live in Paradise (Gospel Hummingbirds Records 2003)
- Life Songs (Gospel Hummingbirds Records 2006)
