= Keepin' the Faith =

Keepin' The Faith

Studio album by Steve Laury
- Released: 1993
- Recorded: 1993
- Genre: Jazz
- Length: 48:27
- Label: Denon Records
- Producer: Steve Laury

Steve Laury chronology
Passion (1991)	Keepin' The Faith (1993)	Vineland Dreams (1996)

Keepin' The Faith is an album by American guitarist Steve Laury released in 1993, and recorded for Denon Records. AllMusic praised the album's "explosive creativity", and found the pairing of Laury and keyboardist Ron Satterfield a "musically satisfying partnership". The album reached No. 1 on the Billboard Contemporary Jazz chart.

== Track listing ==
1. "Keepin' the Faith" (written by: Ron Satterfield / Steve Laury) - 6:38
2. "Close Your Eyes" (Steve Laury / Ron Satterfield) - 5:03
3. "Streets of Gold" (Steve Laury / Ron Satterfield) - 4:30
4. "Steppin' In" (Steve Lauty / Ron Satterfield) - 5:39
5. "October" (Ron Satterfield / Steve Laury) - 5:26
6. "There's One Way" (Steve Laury / Ron Satterfield) - 4:53
7. "Revelation" (Steve Laury / Ron Satterfield) - 5:25
8. "Tears in the Rain" (Ron Satterfield / Steve Laury) - 5:56
9. "Astoria" (Steve Laury / Ron Satterfield) - 4:57

== Personnel ==
- Steve Laury - guitar
- Ron Satterfield - keyboards, bass, vocals
- Duncan Moore - drums, percussion
- Kevin Hennessey - bass
- John Rekevics - saxophone, flute

== Charts ==
Chart (1993)	Peak position
Billboard Jazz Albums	5
