= Tip of the Iceberg (album) =

Studio album by Tom Principato
- Released: 1992
- Genre: Blues
- Label: Powerhouse
- Producers: Tom Principato, Chuck Leavell

Tom Principato chronology
Hot Stuff! (1991)	Tip of the Iceberg (1992)	In the Clouds (1995)

Tip of the Iceberg is an album by the American musician Tom Principato, released in 1992. He supported it with North American and European tours.

== Production ==
The album was produced by Principato and Chuck Leavell. Principato, for the first time in his career, had both the finances and the necessary studio hours to rerecord and do overdubs. "It All Went Down the Drain" is a cover of the Earl King song. "I'd Rather Be Blind" was written by Leon Russell. Principato's version of Curtis Knight's "Drivin' South" was influenced by Jimi Hendrix's interpretation. "Can't You See What You're Doin' to Me" is a cover of the Albert King song. "All My Tears" is an instrumental. "Goodbye for Now" is a tribute to Principato's deceased father.

== Critical reception ==
Professional ratings
Review scores
Source	Rating
AllMusic	4.5/5 stars
DownBeat	4/5 stars
The North County Blade-Citizen	A
The Press of Atlantic City	3/4 stars

The Washington Post said, "More lively, electric and colorful than his previous albums, it boasts a contemporary edge that's likely to win over fans of, say, Clapton or Robert Cray, but it's also rooted in the kind of old-fashioned, uncomplicated blues and soul grooves that have always served Principato well." The Sun Sentinel praised the "snarling blues/rock/r&b blend". The Press of Atlantic City called Principato "merely an adequate singer" but lauded his "tasteful yet powerful chords and solos". The North County Blade-Citizen likened Principato to Stevie Ray Vaughan and George Thorogood. The Plain Dealer noted that "unlike most blues players, he can play a lyric line."

== Track listing ==
No.	Title	Length
1.	"I Call the Law"
2.	"Twister"
3.	"It All Went Down the Drain"
4.	"All My Tears"
5.	"Can't You See What You're Doin' to Me"
6.	"Drivin' South"
7.	"I Only Have Love"
8.	"Goodbye for Now"
9.	"I'd Rather Be Blind"
10.	"Sweet Little Thing"
