= Shawn Holt & the Teardrops =

American blues band

- Origin: Mississippi, United States
- Genres: Blues
- Years active: 2013–present
- Label: Blind Pig Records
- Members: Shawn Holt; Jimi Primetime Smith; Tyson Harrington Bell; Vern Taylor
- Past members: Levi Williams; Christopher Biedron; Russell Jackson; Brian 'Pickle' Gerkensmeyer; Mike Wheeler
- Website: Official website

Shawn Holt & the Teardrops are an American blues band, which formed in 2013 following the death of the outfit's former leader, Magic Slim. Holt being Magic Slim's son.

== Career ==
Shawn Holt commenced his professional career when he was aged 17, touring alongside his father Magic Slim and his uncle Nick Holt, as part of the previous version of the Teardrops. Following that tour, Holt formed his own outfit, Lil' Slim and The Back Alley Blues Band, and continued learning his craft at playing the blues.

Holt became a Teardrop himself in January 2013 and toured with his father that January. During the East coast tour with Johnny Winter, Shawn's father became very ill and ended up in the hospital in Pennsylvania...he told Shawn to carry on. The Teardrops opened for Johnny Winter in Phoenixville, Pennsylvania. The act was well received and Winter requested that they would continue to be his support act for the remainder of his touring commitment.

In 2013, John Primer, a former Teardrop, was the special guest on Shawn Holt & the Teardrops' debut recording, Daddy Told Me. It was recorded in Chicago, Illinois. Primer played and sang on two of the album's tracks, of which five overall were written by Holt. Two songs on the collection were cover versions of Magic Slim's tracks - "Buddy Buddy Friend" and "Please Don’t Dog Me". Another song covered on the album was "Before You Accuse Me". Daddy Told Me was released on the Blind Pig record label. The album reached number one on the Living Blues blues radio chart in October 2013. Pierre Lacocque of Mississippi Heat noted, upon hearing the album, that Holt "only uses a thumb pick for his guitar, with no special effects, and straight into his amplifier. It is indeed a guitar style that is reminiscent of his father's".

On August 15, 2014, they appeared at the Boundary Waters Blues Festival and the following day at the Fargo Blues Festival, then on to Brazil and California. Shawn Holt & the Teardrops are due to play at the Rawa Blues Festival in October 2014.

== Awards ==
In May 2014, Shawn Holt & the Teardrops won a Blues Music Award for Daddy Told Me in the 'Best New Artist Debut' category.

== Band members ==
- Shawn Holt - vocals and guitar
- Jimi 'Primetime' Smith - guitar and vocals
- Tyson Harrington Bell - bass
- Vern Taylor - drums and vocals

formerly

- Mike Wheeler - guitar
- Brian 'Pickle' Gerkensmeyer - bass, guitar
- Russell Jackson - bass
- Levi Williams - guitar, vocals
- Christopher Biedron - Bass

== Discography ==
Year	Title	Record label
2013	Daddy Told Me	Blind Pig Records
