= Lawrence Joel Veterans Memorial Coliseum =

Indoor arena at Wake Forest University

- "The Joel"
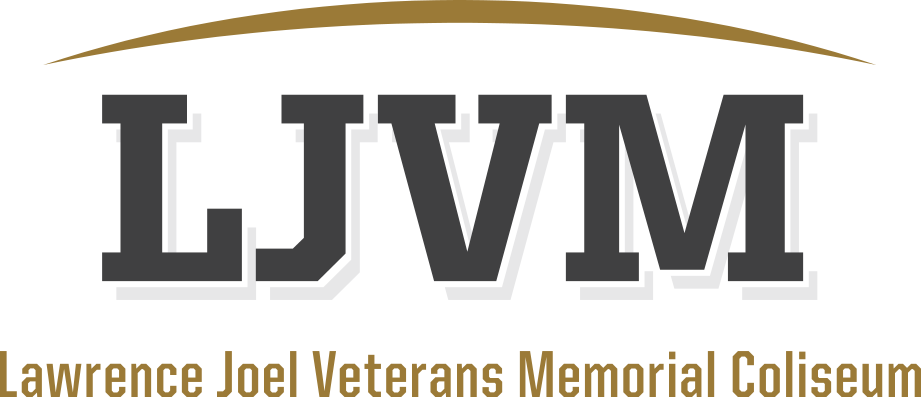
- Interactive map of Lawrence Joel Veterans Memorial Coliseum
- Location: 2825 University Parkway; Winston-Salem, NC 27105
- Coordinates: 36.127866°N 80.257628°W
- Owner: Wake Forest University
- Operator: ASM Global
- Capacity: 14,665 (basketball); 14,407 (multi-purpose); 8,013 Upper level seats 6,559 Lower level seats including roll-out bleachers.
- Surface: Multi-surface, Parquet

Construction
- Groundbreaking: April 23, 1987
- Opened: August 19, 1989
- Cost: $20.1 million ($52.2 million in 2025 dollars)
- Architect: Ellerbe Becket
- General contractor: P.J. Dick Contracting

Tenants
- Wake Forest Demon Deacons (NCAA) (1989–present); Winston-Salem Energy (NIFL) (2002); Carolina Cowboys (PBR) (2022)

Website
- https://ljvm.com/

The Lawrence Joel Veterans Memorial Coliseum (also known as LJVM Coliseum, Joel Coliseum or simply The Joel) is a 14,665-seat multi-purpose arena, in Winston-Salem, North Carolina. Construction on the arena began on April 23, 1987, and it opened on August 28, 1989. It was named after Lawrence Joel, an Army medic from Winston-Salem who was awarded the Medal of Honor in 1967 for action in Vietnam on November 8, 1965. The memorial was designed by James Ford in New York, and includes the poem "The Fallen" engraved on an interior wall. It is home to the Wake Forest University Demon Deacons men's basketball, women's basketball and women's volleyball teams, and is adjacent to the Carolina Classic Fairgrounds. The arena replaced the old Winston-Salem Memorial Coliseum, which was torn down for the LJVM Coliseum's construction.

== Events ==
=== Basketball ===
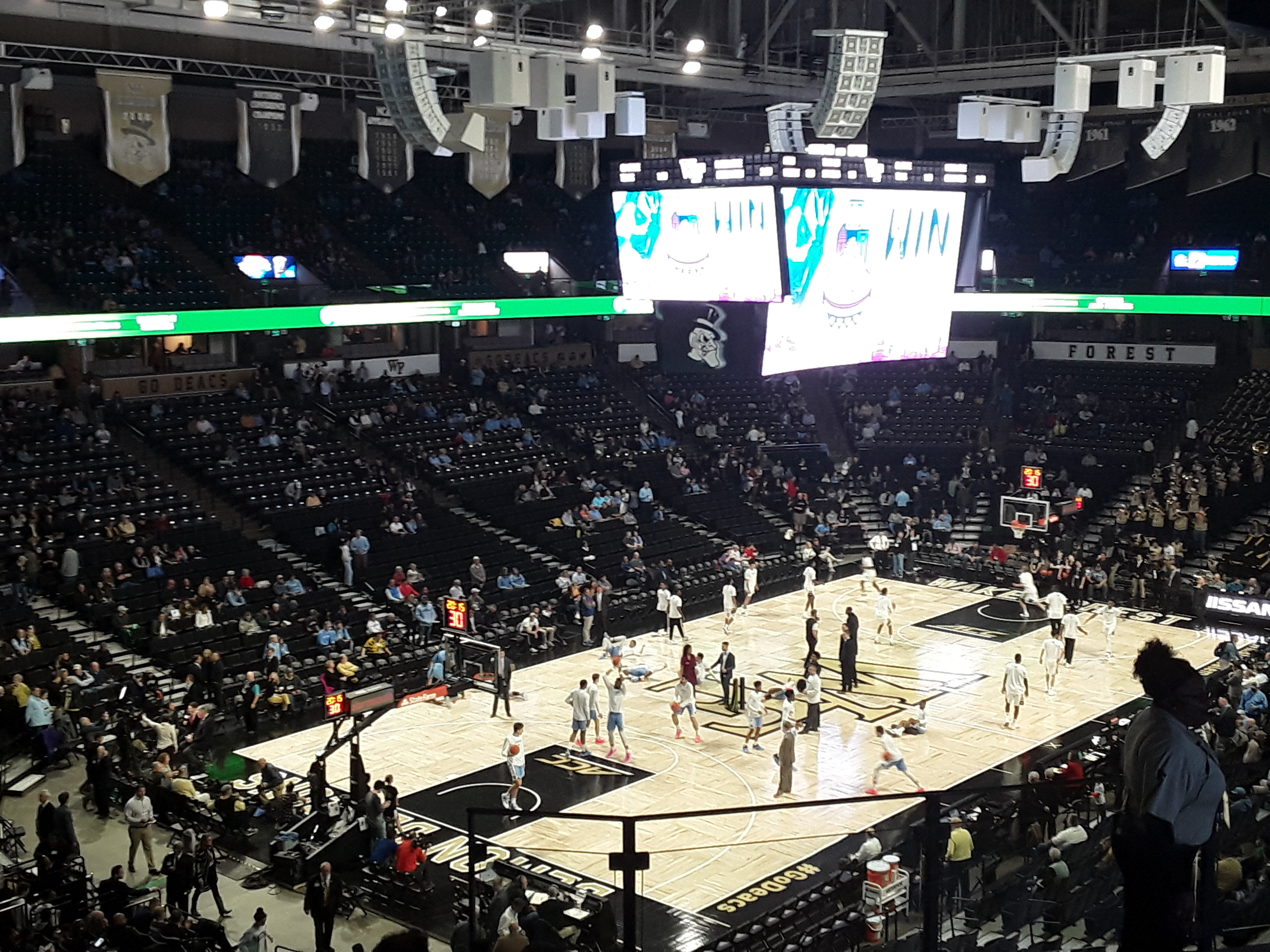
The Coliseum before a 2019 Wake Forest game

The Coliseum is primarily home to the Wake Forest University men's and women's basketball teams. Its construction allowed Wake Forest to move all of its home games to Winston-Salem for the first time in three decades. Starting in 1959, they played a number of ACC games in Greensboro. In 1982, they moved the bulk of their ACC schedule to the larger Greensboro Coliseum, as well as other games against popular opponents that could not be accommodated at the 8,200-seat Memorial Coliseum. The arena has generally featured a parquet floor for basketball games since its opening in 1989.

However, other basketball games are held there, such as the Frank Spencer Holiday Classic basketball tournament, an annual event for high school basketball teams in the area. Since 2003, the LJVM has hosted the North Carolina High School Athletic Association (NCHSAA) Western Regional Basketball Tournaments. The LJVM was the site of the Central Intercollegiate Athletic Association (CIAA) basketball tournament from 1994 to 1999. Also, the first and second rounds of the NCAA Men's Division I Basketball Championship have been held at the Coliseum four times (1993, 1997, 2000 and 2007). It also hosted the MEAC men's basketball tournament from 2009 to 2012.

In a memorable NCAA second-round game at the Coliseum on March 15, 1997, North Carolina gave head coach Dean Smith victory number 877, surpassing Kentucky legend Adolph Rupp as the winningest college basketball coach in history. Another memorable NCAA tournament game at the LJVM Coliseum happened on March 17, 2000 when fifth seeded Florida needed a buzzer beater by Mike Miller to beat twelfth seeded Butler in overtime. The victory started a 5-game winning streak for Florida, including wins over Illinois, #1 Duke, and UNC. The run ended with a loss to Michigan State in the championship game.

The Harlem Globetrotters have played in the Coliseum as well.

=== Professional Wrestling ===
It hosted the annual Fall Brawl pay-per-view event from 1996 to 1999 which also featured the WarGames matches from 1996 to 1998.

=== Concerts ===
The arena has hosted concerts by many famous artists, spanning many different genres. The LJVM's amply large size makes it an ideal location for performers who wish to perform at smaller venues. The main arena can also be curtained off to create a theater-like setting.

List of Concerts
Artist	Event	Date	Opening Act(s)
311	Transistor Tour	December 1, 1997	Sugar Ray
311	Soundsystem Tour	February 28, 2000	Jimmie's Chicken Shack & Incubus
311	Evolver Tour	November 7, 2003	Alien Ant Farm
AC/DC	Ballbreaker World Tour	September 3, 1996	—N/a
Acquire the Fire	—	March 30, 2007	—N/a
Acquire the Fire	—	March 31, 2007	—N/a
Alan Jackson	Freight Train Tour	November 19, 2010	—N/a
Alan Jackson	2019 Tour	May 17, 2019	William Michael Morgan
Avenged Sevenfold	Sounding the Seventh Trumpet Tour	June 26, 2002	—N/a
B.B. King	Blues Summit Tour	January 27, 1994	—N/a
The Beach Boys	Stars and Stripes Vol. 1 Tour	October 13, 1996	—N/a
Billy Joel	1999 Tour	February 9, 1999	—N/a
Blue Man Group	How to Be a Megasta Tour 2.1	February 14, 2008	—N/a
Bob Dylan	Never Ending Tour 1991	May 4, 1991	—N/a
Bob Dylan	Never Ending Tour 2002	February 8, 2002	—N/a
Bob Dylan	Never Ending Tour 2010	October 16, 2010	—N/a
Boston Pops Orchestra	—	December 1, 2008	—N/a
Brad Paisley	Time Well Wasted Tour	November 18, 2005	Sara Evans & Sugarland
Bush	1996 Tour	February 23, 1996	No Doubt & Goo Goo Dolls
Bush	Razorblade Suitcase Tour	April 3, 1997	Veruca Salt
Carrie Underwood	Carnival Ride Tour	October 24, 2008	Little Big Town
Celtic Woman	Songs from the Heart Tour	February 26, 2011	—N/a
Cher	Living Proof: The Farewell Tour	September 15, 2004	—N/a
Chris Paul's Winston-Salem Weekend Concert	—	September 18, 2008	—N/a
Chris Tomlin	Hello Love Tour	April 9, 2009	Israel & New Breed
Dashboard Confessional	Dusk and Summer Tour	November 15, 2006	Brand New
Dave Matthews & Tim Reynolds	2003 Tour	March 28, 2003	—N/a
Dave Matthews Band	Crash Tour	December 28, 1996	Béla Fleck and the Flecktones
David Lee Roth	DLR Band Tour	June 23, 1999	Bad Company
Delirious?	Fire Tour	September 14, 2002	All Star United
Delirious?	Kingdom of Comfort Tour	March 13, 2008	Tree63
Delirious?	Kingdom of Comfort Tour	March 14, 2008	Tree63
Delirious?	Kingdom of Comfort Tour	March 15, 2008	Tree63
Dierks Bentley	High Times & Hangovers Tour	October 14, 2006	Miranda Lambert & Randy Rogers Band
Dixie Chicks	Fly Tour	August 26, 2000	—N/a
Dolly Parton	Hello I'm Dolly Tour	November 7, 2004	The Grascals
Elton John	Big Picture Tour	October 10, 1997	—N/a
Elton John	Peachtree Road Tour	November 9, 2005	—N/a
Elton John	40th Anniversary of the Rocket Man Tour	April 6, 2013	—N/a
Gaither Homecoming	2010 Tour	November 13, 2010	—N/a
Gaither Homecoming	2013 Tour	April 26, 2013	—N/a
Garth Brooks	Sevens Tour	March 25, 1998	—N/a
Garth Brooks	Sevens Tour	March 26, 1998	—N/a
Garth Brooks	Sevens Tour	March 27, 1998	—N/a
Garth Brooks	Sevens Tour	March 28, 1998	—N/a
Gretchen Wilson	Redneck Revolution Tour	February 3, 2006	Blaine Larsen & Van Zant
Hilary Duff	Still Most Wanted Tour	July 30, 2005	Tyler Hilton & Teddy Geiger
Hinder	Badboys of Rock Tour	September 16, 2007	Papa Roach, Fuel, Buckcherry & Rev Theory
Judas Priest	Epitaph World Tour	November 27, 2011	Thin Lizzy & Black Label Society
Kelly Clarkson & Clay Aiken	Independent Tour	March 14, 2004	The Beu Sisters
Lil Wayne	2008 Tour	April 26, 2008	Mr. Carter, Baby & Crime Mob
Ludacris	WSSU Homecoming	October 7, 2006	Yung Joc
Lupe Fiasco	2010 Tour	October 8, 2010	DJ Lil' Boy
Marilyn Manson	Dead to the World Tour	April 19, 1997	Helmet & Rasputina
Marilyn Manson	Rock Is Dead Tour	April 2, 1999	Monster Magnet
Mark Chesnutt	Mark Chesnutt Tour	November 30, 2002	Joe Diffie & Tracy Lawrence
Martina McBride	The Waking Up Laughing Tour	June 2, 2007	Jack Ingram, Little Big Town & Rodney Atkins
Matchbox 20	More Than You Think You Are Tour	September 28, 2003	Sugar Ray & Maroon 5
Michael W. Smith	2009 Tour	October 24, 2009	—N/a
Molly Hatchet	2006 Tour	August 26, 2006	Blackfoot
Music as a Weapon	2011 Tour	February 1, 2011	—N/a
Neil Diamond	1993 Tour	March 3, 1993	—N/a
Neil Diamond	The Movie Album: As Time Goes By Tour	December 11, 1998	—N/a
Newsboys	The Story Music Tour	December 9, 2011	Steven Curtis Chapman, Natalie Grant, Francesca Battistelli, Anthem Lights & Selah
Nine Inch Nails	Further Down the Spiral Tour	November 23, 1994	Marilyn Manson & Jim Rose Circus
O-Town	O-Town Tour	August 23, 2001	—N/a
Onyx	Survival of the Illest Tour	July 4, 1998	Def Squad & DMX
Parachute Band	2010 Tour	March 18, 2010	—N/a
Parachute Band	2010 Tour	March 19, 2010	—N/a
Parachute Band	2010 Tour	March 20, 2010	—N/a
Parachute Band	2010 Tour	April 18, 2010	—N/a
Parachute Band	2010 Tour	April 19, 2010	—N/a
Parachute Band	2010 Tour	April 20, 2010	—N/a
Pantera	The Great Southern Trendkill Tour	September 5, 1997	—N/a
Papa Roach & Buckcherry	Rock Allegiance Tour	September 9, 2011	Puddle of Mudd, P.O.D., RED, Crossfade & Drive A
Phish	Hoist Tour	April 21, 1994	Dave Matthews Band
Phish	1995 Tour	November 21, 1995	—N/a
Phish	Phish Destroys America Tour	November 23, 1997	—N/a
Phish	The Story of the Ghost Tour	November 19, 1998	—N/a
Piedmont Wind Symphony	Guest Artist Concert	May 22, 2008	Arturo Sandoval & Three Dog Night
Primus	Punchbowl Tour	November 29, 1995	Meat Puppets
Radio City Christmas Spectacular	2009 Tour	December 4, 2009	—N/a
Radio City Christmas Spectacular	2009 Tour	December 5, 2009	—N/a
Rascal Flatts	Melt Tour	October 10, 2003	Chris Cagle & Brian McComas
Rascal Flatts	Here's to You Tour	November 6, 2004	Gary Allan, Blake Shelton & Keith Anderson
Rascal Flatts	Bob That Head Tour	January 24, 2008	Jessica Simpson
Reba McEntire & Kelly Clarkson	2 Worlds 2 Voices Tour	January 25, 2008	Melissa Peterman
Sounds of the Underground	2005 Tour	June 30, 2005	—N/a
Styx	Can't Stop Rockin' Tour	November 12, 2009	REO Speedwagon & .38 Special
Switchfoot & Relient K	Appetite for Construction Tour	November 2, 2007	Ruth
Sublime with Rome	Sublime with Rome Tour	October 22, 2010	The Dirty Heads
Sugarland	Change for Change Tour	September 29, 2007	Little Big Town & Jake Owen
T. Graham Brown	The Next Right Thing Tour	August 7, 2004	—N/a
Tesla	Psychotic Supper Tour	May 15, 1992	FireHouse
Thomas Rhett	Home Team Tour	March 18, 2017	Kelsea Ballerini, Russell Dickerson & Ryan Hurd
Tiësto	Club Life Tour	September 22, 2011	Porter Robinson
Tina Turner	Wildest Dreams Tour	July 2, 1997	Cyndi Lauper
Tool	Lateralus Tour	November 2, 2002	Meshuggah
Tool	10,000 Days Tour	June 13, 2007	Melt-Banana
Union Station	2004 Tour	June 3, 2004	Jerry Douglas
Vince Gill	High Lonesome Sound Tour	March 20, 1997	Bryan White
White Zombie	Astro-Creep: 2000 Tour	June 28, 1996	—N/a
Widespread Panic	Everyday Tour	October 2, 1993	Blues Traveler
Widespread Panic	1994 Tour	March 17, 1994	—N/a
Widespread Panic	1998 Tour	November 6, 1998	—N/a
Widespread Panic	'Til the Medicine Takes Tour	November 26, 1999	Dirty Dozen Brass Band
Widespread Panic	2002 Tour	November 6, 2002	Karl Denson's Tiny Universe
Wiz Khalifa & Yelawolf	Waken Baken Tour	November 10, 2010	Big K.R.I.T. & DJ Bonics
Zac Brown Band	You Get What You Give Tour	April 6, 2011	Blackberry Smoke
ZZ Top	Gang of Outlaws Tour	June 1, 2012	3 Doors Down & Gretchen Wilson

=== Other events ===
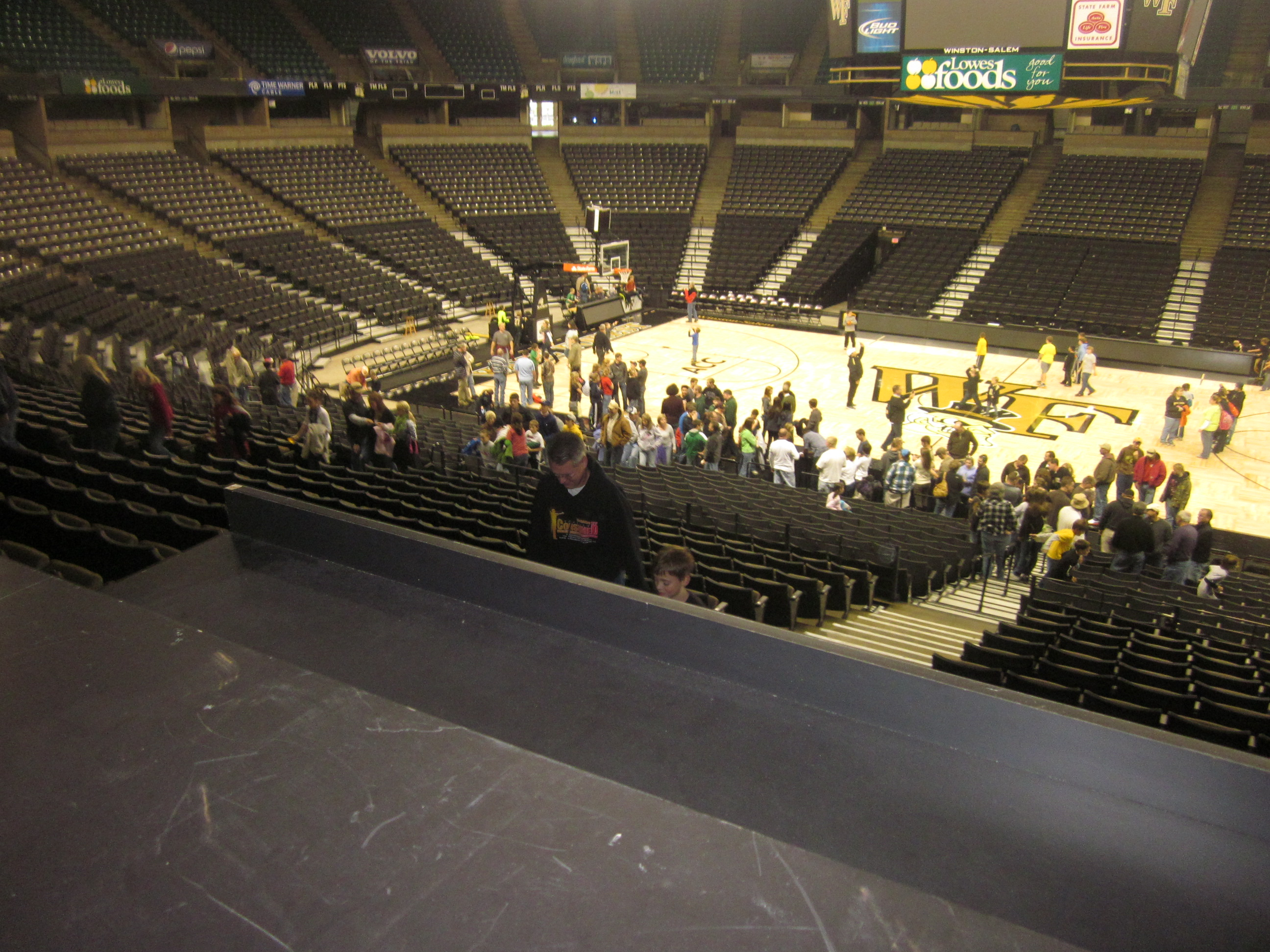
Inside of the Lawrence Joel Veterans Memorial Coliseum

The LJVM has played host to large-scale events such as the quarterfinals of the 2007 Davis Cup, but has also hosted racing, bull riding, circus, religious conferences, conventions and other events.

Barney's third stage show, and first national stage show tour Barney’s Big Surprise was taped at the coliseum in 1997 and was released in 1998

The movie The Longest Ride filmed a bull riding scene at the Coliseum in August 2014.

== Coliseum Complex ==
Prior to being purchased by Wake Forest in 2013, the LJVM was the centerpiece of the Winston-Salem Entertainment-Sports Complex. This complex originally included Joel Coliseum, Truist Field (Groves Stadium), David F. Couch Ballpark (Ernie Shore Field), the Fairgrounds Arena and the off-site Bowman-Gray Stadium.

== Ownership ==
The Winston-Salem Foundation donated the land the coliseum now sits on to the city of Winston-Salem in 1969. The city of Winston-Salem completed construction of the coliseum in 1989 at a cost of $20.1 million. On May 20, 2013, the Winston-Salem city council approved the sale of the Joel Coliseum to Wake Forest University for $8 million. Wake Forest may consider buying the naming rights to the arena as well, which is currently owned by the city. Wake Forest University completed the purchase of Lawrence Joel Veterans Memorial Coliseum and the surrounding 33 acres on August 1, 2013. Wake Forest has made numerous upgrades to the coliseum, including LED court lighting, which improved energy costs, and a 1,400-foot center hung display monitor at mid-court.

== See also ==
- List of NCAA Division I basketball arenas
