= Vineland Dreams =

Studio album by Steve Laury
- Released: February 6, 1996
- Recorded: March–May 1995 at Studio West - San Diego, CA
- Genre: Jazz - Smooth Jazz
- Length: 53:28
- Label: CTI Records
- Producer: Steve Laury

Steve Laury chronology
Keepin' the Faith (1993)	Vineland Dreams (1996)	New Steve Laury (2006)

Vineland Dreams is an album by American guitarist Steve Laury released in 1996, and recorded for the CTI label. The New York Times called Vineland Dreams "some of the finest smooth jazz cuts you'll hear", and called Laury's solo work "a testament to his sheer craftsmanship"

== Track listing ==
(all tracks written by Steve Laury and Ron Satterfield)

1. Gloria Ann (Steve Laury / Ron Satterfield) - 5:26
2. Vineland Dreams (Steve Laury / Ron Satterfield) - 5:30
3. Let's Stay Together (Wille Mitchell/Al Green/Al Jackson) - 5:01
4. When Dreams Come True (Steve Laury) - 6:24
5. The Moon Beneath The Clouds (Steve Laury) - 5:34
6. I'll Be There (Hal Davis / Berry Gordy / Willie Hutch) - 4:42
7. Cara Mia (Steve Laury) - 5:15
8. Lullaby For Laura (Steve Laury) - 5:32
9. 59th Street (Steve Laury) - 5:38
10. Angel - (Wes Montgomery) - 4:26

== Personnel ==
- Steve Laury - guitar
- Rob Whitlock - keyboards
- James Raymond - keyboards
- Kevin Hennessy - bass
- Norm Stockton - bass
- Duncan Moore - drums, percussion
- Mitch Manker - trumpet
- John Rekevics - saxophone
- Ed Graves - vocals
