= Altered Five Blues Band =

American blues band

- Also known as: Altered Five
- Origin: Milwaukee, Wisconsin, United States
- Genre: Blues
- Years active: 2002–present
- Label: Various including Blind Pig Records
- Members: Jeff Schroedl; Mark Solveson; Alan Arber; Steve Huebler
- Past members: Jeff Taylor; Scott Schroedl; Raymond Trevich
- Website: Official website

Altered Five Blues Band (originally known as Altered Five) is an American five-piece blues band. Formed in 2002 in Milwaukee, Wisconsin, United States, they have released six albums since 2008. Their 2021 release, Holler If You Hear Me, reached number three on the US Billboard Top Blues Albums Chart. Founding frontman Jeff Taylor died in 2026 at the age of 64.

== Career ==
The group was formed in Milwaukee, Wisconsin, United States, in 2002 and originally billed as simply 'Altered Five'. Bluesified, their debut album composed entirely of cover versions, was released by Cold Wind Records in June 2008. Cold Wind were based in Minneapolis, but the record label's head died and Altered Five were forced to move to another local distributor. This led to the release of Gotta Earn It on Conclave Records (2012). Their fortunes changed for the better with their next recording, Cryin' Mercy (2014). It was produced by Tom Hambridge and was the group's first release on OmniVibe Records. The record was deemed to be the 'Best Self-Released CD' at the 2015 International Blues Challenge. As the band was effectively between percussionists at the time, Hambridge played drums on all tracks on the album, although Jeff Schroedl's brother Scott played drums on their YouTube videos, produced alongside the album's promotional release. By now the band was well known as the Altered Five Blues Band and the band's members wrote every track on Cryin' Mercy.

The group then signed to Blind Pig Records, who had been recently acquired by the Orchard, a subsidiary of Sony Music. The Altered Five Blues Band next album, Charmed & Dangerous, was issued via Blind Pig in 2017, and the album track "Cookin' in My Kitchen" won 'Song of the Year' in 2018 at the Independent Music Awards. Guitar World called the album's title track a "menacing, swampy blues". Altered Five Blues Band were nominated for a Blues Music Award in the 'Best Emerging Artist Album' category in 2018.

Their next album, Ten Thousand Watts, was released on September 6, 2019, on Blind Pig Records and was again produced by Tom Hambridge, being recorded at Ocean Way in Nashville, Tennessee, in four days. Ten Thousand Watts reached number 10 on the Billboard Top Blues Albums Chart. A track from that album, "Great Minds Drink Alike", won first place in the blues category of the International Songwriting Competition. Over the years, the band has performed at festivals and venues including the Grolsch Blues Festival, W.C. Handy Blues Festival, Ann Arbor Blues and Jazz Festival, King Biscuit Blues Festival, Baltic Blues Fest, Milwaukee Summerfest, Magic City Blues Fest, Fargo Blues Fest, and at B.B. King's Blues Club, plus Buddy Guy's Legends.

The band's members are not all full-time musicians. For example, vocalist Jeff Taylor's day job is as a principal of a school in Wisconsin. Guitarist Jeff Schroedl is concurrently an executive vice president of the Hal Leonard Corporation. He has also served as a board member of the Music Publishers Association of the United States since 2011 and, in 2010, was recognized as one of the Milwaukee Business Journal's '40 under 40.'

Altered Five Blues Band celebrated their 20th anniversary as a band and released their sixth album, Holler if You Hear Me on September 3, 2021, via Blind Pig. The album was featured in Guitar World. It was again produced by Hambridge and recorded within five days at Ocean Way Nashville. Holler if You Hear Me also featured a guest appearances by the harmonica player Jason Ricci on five tracks. It debuted at number 3 on the Billboard Blues Chart and garnered three Blues Music Award nominations, including 'Album of the Year' and 'Song of the Year'. All of the 13 original songs were penned by Schroedl. When commenting on equipment used on the album, Schroedl opined, "I used two Strats on the entire record – my 1966 and a 1962 that was at the studio. The '62 had a lot of mojo, so I played that quite a bit, using different pickup combinations. I mostly plugged directly into the amps and cranked them up to about eight – including my 1968 Super Reverb, tweed Bassman and 1964 Vibroverb." Schroedl in another interview stated, "Several years ago I simply stopped trying to sound like someone else and started to build my own style around […] the quirky things that set me apart, and started to emphasize those things."

On April 30, 2026, founding vocalist and frontman Jeffrey Taylor died unexpectedly at his home in West Allis, Wisconsin, at the age of 64. Taylor had served as the band's lead singer since its formation in 2002.

== Awards ==
- Cryin' Mercy (2014) was the 'Best Self-Released CD' named at the 2015 International Blues Challenge.
- "Cookin' in My Kitchen" from Charmed & Dangerous (2017), won 'Song of the Year' in 2018 at the Independent Music Awards.
- "Great Minds Drink Alike" from Ten Thousand Watts, won first place in the blues category of the International Songwriting Competition.
- Altered Five Blues Band were nominated for a Blues Music Award in 2018.
- Holler If You Hear Me received three nominations for a Blues Music Award, including 'Album of the Year' and 'Song of the Year'.

The 44th Blues Music Awards nominees in 2023 for 'Song of the Year', included Altered Five Blues Band's "Great Minds Drink Alike" (written by Jeff Schroedl).

== Band members ==
- Jeff Schroedl – Guitar
- Mark Solveson – Bass guitar
- Alan Arber – Drums
- Steve Huebler – Keyboards

Formerly

- Jeff Taylor – Lead vocals (2002–2026)
- Scott Schroedl – Drums
- Raymond Tevich – Keyboards

== Discography ==
=== Albums ===
Year	Title	Label	US Billboard Top Blues Albums Chart
2008	Bluesified	Cold Wind Records	–
2012	Gotta Earn It	Conclave Records	–
2014	Cryin' Mercy	OmniVibe Records	–
2017	Charmed & Dangerous	Blind Pig Records	–
2019	Ten Thousand Watts	Blind Pig Records	10
2021	Holler If You Hear Me	Blind Pig Records	3
2026	Hammer & Chisel	Blind Pig Records	TBA

=== Singles ===
Year	Title	Label
2019	"Great Minds Drink Alike"	Blind Pig Records
