= Steppin' Out (Gospel Hummingbirds album) =

Studio album by Gospel Hummingbirds
- Released: 1992
- Genre: Gospel, R&B
- Label: Blind Pig
- Producer: Bonnie Hayes, Jimmy Pugh

Gospel Hummingbirds chronology
Route 66 to Heaven (1981)	Steppin' Out (1992)	Taking Flight (1995)

Steppin' Out is an album by the American musical group Gospel Hummingbirds, released in 1992. It was the first gospel album to be released by Blind Pig Records. Steppin' Out was nominated for a Grammy Award for "Best Traditional Soul Gospel Album".

== Production ==
The album was produced by Bonnie Hayes and Jimmy Pugh. The backing musicians included members of Robert Cray's band. The harmonies were arranged by group member Joe Thomas, who was influenced chiefly by the Swan Silvertones. "Swing Low Sweet Chariot" is a version of the traditional Christian hymn.

== Critical reception ==
Professional ratings
Review scores
Source	Rating
All Music Guide	5/5 stars
Chicago Tribune	3.5/4 stars
The Grove Press Guide to the Blues on CD	3/5 stars
Los Angeles Times	2/4 stars
Oakland Tribune	3.5/4 stars
Orlando Sentinel	4/5 stars
The Philadelphia Inquirer	3/4 stars

The Chicago Tribune noted that "few other gospel groups so successfully blur the lines between gospel and rhythm and blues". The Orlando Sentinel praised "That Same Thing", calling it "a toe-tapping number that starts with a funky, tumbling bass line and Roy Tyler's hearty, joyful voice". The Los Angeles Times opined that "the vocal blend on the ballad 'Change', notably the falsetto flourishes, and the jazzy groove of 'Safety Zone' are the only distinctive songs here." The San Antonio Express-News said that the "full rocking band that really brings the rock of ages message home". The Philadelphia Inquirer stated that the "rhythms combine the street and the pulpit into an effortless puree." Stereo Review pointed out that the lead singer, Rob Tyler, composed some of the album's most compelling tracks.

== Track listing ==
No.	Title	Length
1.	"That Same Thing"
2.	"Don't Let the Devil Ride"
3.	"Don't Move the Mountain"
4.	"Change"
5.	"Judgement Day"
6.	"Step Out"
7.	"He'll Be Your Friend"
8.	"Here I Am"
9.	"Swing Low Sweet Chariot"
10.	"Ain't Nobody's Business"
11.	"Safety Zone"
12.	"Any Day"
