= Frank Spencer Holiday Classic =

Basketball tournament held in Winston-Salem, North Carolina

The Frank Spencer Holiday Classic is a basketball tournament held in Winston-Salem, North Carolina in late December. The tournament is named after Frank Spencer, former sports editor for the Winston-Salem Journal, and is a significant fundraiser for the high schools of Winston-Salem/Forsyth County Schools.

== History ==
As a result of Spencer's relentless campaign throughout the state of North Carolina, 11 high schools built gymnasiums in the 1930s and 1940s that included basketball courts. His dream come true was the formation of the Northwest (NC) Basketball Tournament which he ran from the 1920s through the early 1950s. The tournament eventually had more than 140 teams and lasted nearly four weeks. "Ripley's Believe It or Not" recognized the tournament as the world's largest sports tournament.

After a 20-year hiatus, the tournament was revived in 1974 and was formatted to a smaller three-day even held each December between Christmas and New Year's at Winston-Salem Memorial Coliseum, and upon its demolition, the newly built Lawrence Joel Veterans Memorial Coliseum.

High school participants of past Frank Spencer tournaments who went on to play professional basketball include NBA players Chris Paul, Josh Howard and Othello Hunter, as well as professional players in non-U.S. leagues including Reyshawn Terry.

The 2011 tournament produced some firsts. In the Pepsi Bracket, Forsyth Country Day became the first private school to win a Frank Spencer Championship. The Furies defeated West Forsyth for the title in overtime. That game also marked the first championship game to be decided in overtime.

In the Champion Bracket, West Stokes became the first 2A school to win the Frank Spencer Championship. The Wildcats defeated Winston-Salem Prep in triple-overtime. The game is also the longest game in tournament history.

== Past Champions ==
2021 Glenn (Pepsi Bracket)
2021 Winston-Salem Prep (WSFCS Bracket)
2020 No Tournament Held
2019 Mt. Tabor (Pepsi Bracket)
2019 North Forsyth (Wake Forest Baptist Sports Bracket)
2018 East Forsyth (Pepsi Bracket)
2018 Parkland (Myers Tire Bracket)
2017 RJ Reynolds (Pepsi Bracket)
2017 Winston-Salem Prep (Champion Bracket)
2016 West Forsyth (Champion Bracket)
2016 Mt. Airy (Pepsi Bracket)
2015 RJ Reynolds (Champion Bracket)
2015 Parkland (Pepsi Bracket)
2014 Reagan (Champion Bracket)
2014 East Forsyth (Pepsi Bracket)
2013 East Forsyth (Champion Bracket)
2013 West Stokes (Pepsi Bracket)
2012 Mt. Tabor (Champion Bracket)
2012 Forsyth Country Day (Pepsi Bracket)
2011 West Stokes (Champion Bracket)
2011 Forsyth Country Day (Pepsi Bracket)
2010 Lexington (Journal Bracket)
2010 Reagan (Pepsi Bracket)
2009 Reagan
2008 Mt. Tabor
2007 Mt. Tabor
2006 (National) Kathleen HS (Kathleen, Fla.)
2006 (Local) East Forsyth
2005 (National) South Laurel HS (South Laurel, Ky.)
2005 (Local)Mt. Tabor
2004 (National) Gaffney HS (Gaffney, S.C.)
2004 (Local) Parkland
2003 West Forsyth
2002 West Forsyth
2001 North Forsyth
2000 R.J. Reynolds
1999 R.J. Reynolds
1998 R.J. Reynolds
1997 Mt. Tabor
1996 Carver
1995 West Forsyth
1994 Glenn
1993 Parkland
1992 East Forsyth
1991 Carver
1990 Carver
1989 North Forsyth
1988 Eden Morehead
1987 Glenn
1986 North Forsyth
1985 North Surry
1984 North Forsyth
1983 Chapel Hill
1982 North Surry
1981 Hickory
1980 Parkland
1979 West Forsyth
1978 North Forsyth
1977 East Forsyth
1976 North Forsyth
1975 No Tournament Held
1974 R.J. Reynolds

=== Tournament Championships ===
| School | Championships | Last |
|---|---|---|
| North Forsyth | 6 | 2001 |
| Mt. Tabor | 5 | 2012 |
| R.J Reynolds | 5 | 2015 |
| West Forsyth | 5 | 2016 |
| East Forsyth | 4 | 2003 |
| Carver | 3 | 1996 |
| Parkland | 3 | 2004 |
| Reagan | 3 | 2014 |
| Glenn | 3 | 2021 |
| North Surry | 2 | 1985 |
| Forsyth Country Day | 2 | 2012 |
| West Stokes | 2 | 2013 |
| Winston-Salem Prep | 2 | 2021 |
| Chapel Hill | 1 | 1983 |
| Eden Morehead | 1 | 1988 |
| Gaffney (SC) | 1 | 2004 |
| Hickory | 1 | 1981 |
| Kathleen (FL) | 1 | 2006 |
| Lexington | 1 | 2010 |
| South Laurel (KY) | 1 | 2005 |
