= Bill Perry (musician) =

American blues musician (1957–2007)

Bill Perry (December 25, 1957 - July 17, 2007) was an American blues musician. The guitarist, songwriter and singer toured throughout the U.S. and Europe. In the 1980s, he was the main guitarist for Richie Havens; he also toured with Garth Hudson and Levon Helm around the same time.

William Sanford Perry was born in Goshen, New York, United States. In 1995, he was signed for an unprecedented five-album deal with the Pointblank/Virgin label. The Bill Perry Blues Band consisted of Bill Perry (lead vocals, lead guitar), John Reddan (guitar and vocals), Tim Tindall (bass guitar) and Rob Curtis (drums). The band released a total of seven albums between 1994 and 2006.

He died of a heart attack in Sugar Loaf, New York on July 17, 2007, at the age of 49.

== Discography ==
- Love Scars (Pointblank, 1994)
- Greycourt Lighting (Virgin, 1998)
- High Octane "Live at Manny's Car Wash" (independent release, 1999)
- Fire It Up (Blind Pig, 2001)
- Crazy Kind of Life (Blind Pig, 2002)
- Raw Deal (Blind Pig, 2004)
- Don't Know Nothing About Love (Blind Pig, 2006)
