= John Mooney (musician) =

American blues guitarist and singer (born 1955)

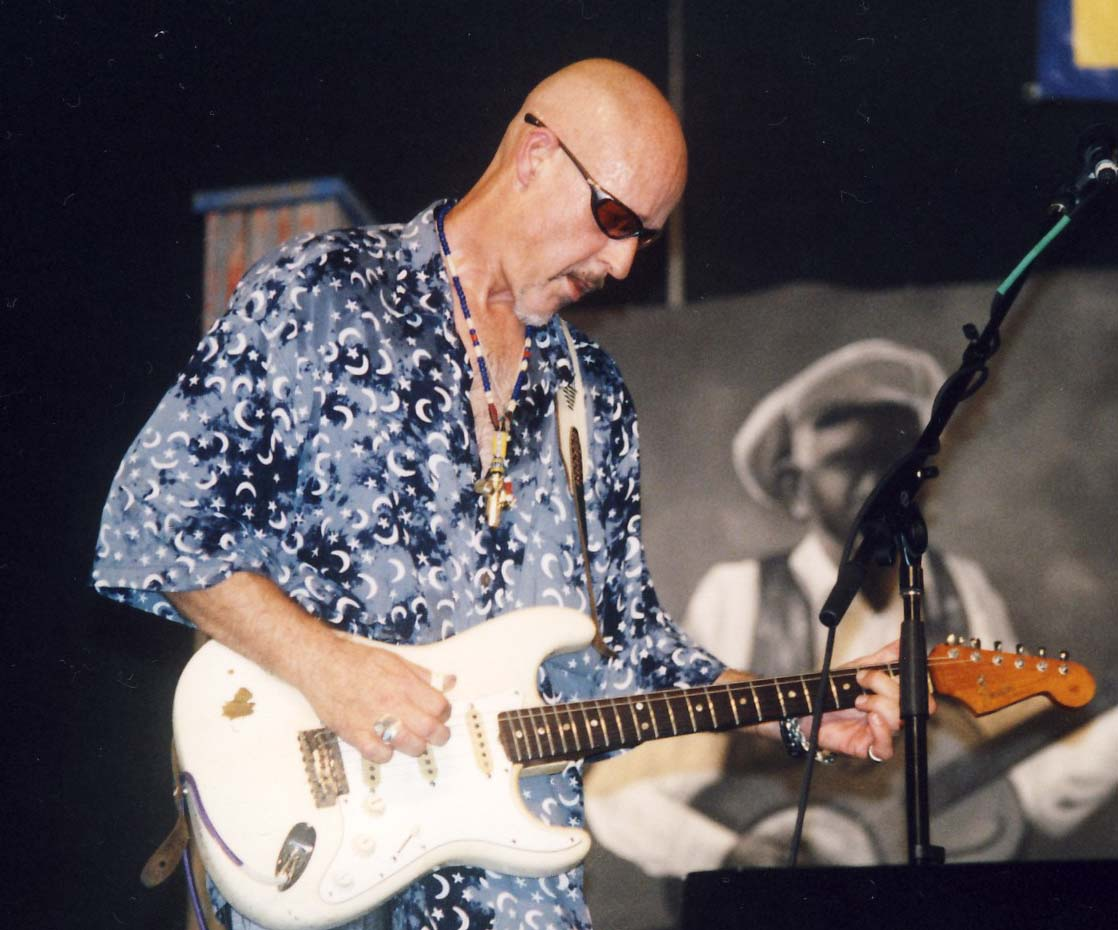
- John Mooney at the New Orleans Jazz & Heritage Festival, 2004

Background information
- Born: April 3, 1955 (age 70); East Orange, New Jersey, United States
- Origin: New Orleans, Louisiana, United States
- Genres: Blues, Delta blues
- Occupation: Musician
- Instrument: Guitar
- Years active: 1979–present
- Labels: Blind Pig; House of Blues; Powerhouse; Bullseye Blues; Ruf; Domino; CrossCut; Live Music Lives
- Website: http://www.johnmooneylive.com/

John Mooney (born April 3, 1955) is an American blues guitarist and singer based in New Orleans, Louisiana. He has developed a unique music style by combining Delta blues with the funky second line beat of New Orleans. He is especially known for his slide guitar work.

== Early life ==
Mooney was born in East Orange, New Jersey, and raised in Rochester, New York. He left home when he was 15. The following year, he met Son House, a Mississippi bluesman who became a huge musical influence on him.

== Musical career ==
In 1976, Mooney moved to New Orleans, and soon he was playing with host of musicians in the New Orleans R&B circuit including Earl King, The Meters, Snooks Eaglin and Professor Longhair.

He released his first album, Comin' Your Way, on Blind Pig Records in 1979. In 1981, he formed his own band, Bluesiana, with whom he has been recording and touring since. He has released albums from several different labels including Against the Wall on the House of Blues label in the U.S., and also others from the German labels CrossCut and Ruf. In 2000, he returned to Blind Pig to release Gone to Hell which featured Dr. John as a special guest. All I Want followed two years later on the label.

His album, Big Ol' Fiya, was nominated for a Blues Music Award for "Contemporary Blues Album of the Year" in 2007.

== Family life ==
Mooney has three children, Zach, Sienna and Devon Mooney. His eldest son, Zack, was once ranked third in the US in Yu-Gi-Oh!. Sienna, an aspiring photographer, attends University of Central Florida, focusing on a major in cinema studies with a minor in French, and makes videos on YouTube.

== Discography ==
- 1979 Comin' Your Way (Blind Pig)
- 1984 Telephone Blues (Powerhouse)
- 1985 Sideways in Paradise (first pressing, Seymour Records no catalog reference) (this album with Jimmy Thackery)
- 1990 Late Last Night (Bullseye Blues)
- 1991 Telephone King (Powerhouse)
- 1992 Testimony (Domino)
- 1993 Sideways in Paradise (with Jimmy Thackery) (Blind Pig)
- 1995 Travelin' On (CrossCut)
- 1995 Dealing with the Devil (Ruf)
- 1996 Against the Wall (House of Blues)
- 2000 Gone to Hell (Blind Pig)
- 2002 All I Want (Blind Pig)
- 2006 Big Ol' Fiya (Live Music Lives)
- 2014 Son and Moon (Fatback Records)
- 2016 Live at Jazzfest 2016 (Munck Music)
- 2017 Truth of the Matter (John Mooney Music / Funny Bird Records)
