= Tom Principato =

American songwriter

- Born: 1952 (age 73–74); Washington, D.C., U.S.
- Genres: Electric blues, blues rock
- Occupations: Singer, guitarist, and songwriter
- Instruments: Vocals, guitar
- Years active: 1970s–present
- Label: Various
- Website: tomprincipato.com

Tom Principato (born 1952) is an American electric blues and blues rock singer, guitarist, and songwriter.

Principato has recorded more than twenty albums over the years. One of his most recent releases, Robert Johnson Told Me So (2013), featured keyboard work by Chuck Leavell. Pat Metheny said, "He (Principato) has an enormous talent at telling stories in his solos; he doesn't play 'standard' licks."

== Life and career ==
Principato was born in Washington, D.C., and was initially inspired by the music of Roy Buchanan, Chet Atkins, and Danny Gatton. A life changing moment happened while he was a teenager. Principato remembered "seeing B.B. King for three shows a night, three nights in a row, in 1969 at The Cellar Door club. I was 17 years old, still in high school, and still developing my guitar and music skills." Principato led the band Powerhouse in the late 1970s, which released Night Life to some acclaim. He joined Geoff Muldaur on tour in 1980, and recorded an album, I Ain't Drunk, as part of the ensemble known as Geoff Muldaur and His Bad Feet. He followed this by operating as a session musician, playing both in the studio and in concert with musicians including Sunnyland Slim, Billy Price, Big Mama Thornton, and James Montgomery. Joining the Assassins with Jimmy Thackery, he recorded two albums, No Previous Record (1986) and Partners in Crime (1987). The latter recording earned Principato his first Washington Area Music Awards (Wammys).

By the mid-1980s, Principato commenced his solo career, recording the live album, Blazing Telecasters, with Danny Gatton. It was eventually released in 1990 and considered for a Grammy Award nomination. In 1988, Principato appeared at the Notodden Blues Festival.

Since then Principato has recorded a string of solo albums, which have seen him accompanied by an ever changing backing ensemble. These include Smokin' (1985), I Know What You're Thinkin'... (1989), In Orbit (1991), Tip of the Iceberg (1992), In the Clouds (1995), and Really Blue (1998). Tip of the Iceberg was co-produced by Chuck Leavell, who had also performed on Really Blue. In 1995, Principato's song "In The Clouds" was also considered for nominating for a Grammy.

Fingers on Fire (2002) was originally recorded in 1978 with Pete Kennedy (now with The Kennedys), and was followed by more solo work on House on Fire (2003), Guitar Gumbo (2005), and Raising the Roof! (2008). The latter album gained Principato another Wammy in 2009. In July 2011, he and his band performed at the Montreux Jazz Festival.

His album, Robert Johnson Told Me So, was launched at the Bethesda Blues & Jazz Supper Club on November 16, 2013.

=== Bibliography ===
In 2000, Principato's book, Open-String Guitar Chords, was published by the Hal Leonard Corporation (ISBN 978-0634004780). In 2020, Principato's book of memoirs They Tell Me I Had A Good Time was published by Powerhouse Records (ISBN 978-1-09830-412-6).

=== Awards and endorsements ===
Principato has earned twenty Washington Area Music Awards (Wammys).

Since the 1990s, Principato has had endorsement deals with Fender, Seymour Duncan pick ups, Curt Mangan strings, and Roger Mayer guitar effects pedals.

=== Present day ===
Currently living in Falls Church, Virginia, he regularly tours across North America plus Europe, and continues to self-release records.

== Discography ==
=== Albums ===
Year	Title	Record label(s)	Credits and notes
1984	Blazing Telecasters	Powerhouse Records	Danny Gatton / Tom Principato (live album)
1985	Smokin'	Powerhouse Records	Tom Principato
1989	I Know What You're Thinkin'...	Powerhouse Records / Sting Music	The Tom Principato Band
1991	In Orbit	Powerhouse Records / Ichiban Records	Tom Principato featuring Powerhouse
1991	Hot Stuff!	Powerhouse Records / Ichiban Records	Tom Principato
1992	Tip of the Iceberg	Powerhouse Records	Tom Principato
1995	In the Clouds	Powerhouse Records / Ichiban Records	Tom Principato
1998	Really Blue	Ichiban Records	Tom Principato
2000	Live and Kickin'	Powerhouse Records	Tom Principato (live album)
2000	Not One Word	Powerhouse Records	Tom Principato
2001	Play It Cool	DixieFrog Records	Tom Principato
2001	Blue Licks & Voodoo Things	DixieFrog Records	Tom Principato
2001	Live in Europe 1988	Powerhouse Records	The Tom Principato Band (live album)
2002	Fingers on Fire	Powerhouse Records	Tom Principato and Pete Kennedy
2003	Blues Over the Years	Voodoo Records / DixieFrog Records	Tom Principato
2003	House on Fire	Powerhouse Records	Tom Principato
2005	Oh No! More Blazing Telecasters	Powerhouse Records	Danny Gatton / Tom Principato (live album)
2005	Guitar Gumbo	Powerhouse Records / DixieFrog Records	Tom Principato
2008	Raising the Roof!	DixieFrog Records	The Tom Principato Band
2010	A Part of Me	Powerhouse Records / DixieFrog Records	Tom Principato
2012	Guitars on Fire : Live at Chez Paulette	Powerhouse Records	Fred Chapellier / Tom Principato (live album)
2013	Robert Johnson Told Me So	Powerhouse Records	Tom Principato
2015	Live & Still Kickin	Powerhouse Records	Tom Principato
2020	House on Fire [Live in Europe]	Powerhouse Records	Tom Principato (live album)
2021	Fifty Years Live	Powerhouse Records	Tom Principato
2021	Down The Road	Powerhouse Records	Tom Principato
2021	Really Blue Anniv. Ed.	Powerhouse Records	Tom Principato
2022	It's Tele Time! Tribute to Roy Buchanan & Danny Gatton	Powerhouse Records	Tom Principato

== See also ==
- List of blues rock musicians
- List of electric blues musicians
- Music of Washington, D.C.
