= Kingston Mines (blues club) =

Nightclub in Chicago, Illinois

Coordinates: 41.9287°N 87.6491°W

- Interactive map of Kingston Mines
- Address: 2548 N Halsted; Lincoln Park, Chicago, Illinois; United States
- Type: Blues nightclub
- Public transit: 8 Halsted bus; RedFullerton stop on the Red/Brown Lines
- Parking: Limited street parking

Construction
- Opened: 1968

Website
- www.kingstonmines.com

Kingston Mines is a blues nightclub in Lincoln Park, Chicago, Illinois. It is named after Kingston Mines, Illinois, and is "the oldest, continuously operating blues club in Chicago."

== History ==
The club derived its name from the Kingston Mines Theatre Company founded by June Pyskacek in 1969 at 2356 N. Lincoln Avenue and named after Kingston Mines, Illinois, where the father of one of its actors, Jack Wallace, worked. Pyskacek asked Harry Hoch and a partner to open a café and performance space in the front of the building called the Kingston Mines Company Store.

The company was acquired in 1972 by Lenin "Doc" Pellegrino, M.D., and renamed the Kingston Mines Café. The original production of Grease was written and first premiered at the Kingston Mines Theatre in 1971 before moving to Broadway a year later. The theatre company expired in 1973, while the Café survived as a blues club. It moved to its current location at 2548 N. Halsted in 1982.

After Doc Pelligrino died in 2018, he passed ownership to his daughters, Donna and Lisa Pellegrino.

The club closed in 2020 due to the COVID-19 pandemic. Fans donated over $60,000 to a GoFundMe to help the club reopen. Before the pandemic, Kingston Mines showcased a variety of blues by two separate bands, every night year-round, on two stages. As of 2023, the club is open on Thursday, Friday, and Saturday nights.

Kingston Mines is still owned by the Pellegrino family and it is "the oldest, continuously operating blues club in Chicago." Doc Pellegrino's motto was: "Hear Blues. Drink Booze. Talk Loud. You're Among Friends."

== Blues ==
Kingston Mines showcases blues music ranging from delta blues to Chicago blues. Their featured artists cover a broad and diverse spectrum of the genre.

Koko Taylor, Carl Weathersby, and Magic Slim have played there, among a myriad more. The Kingston Mines has two alternating "headline" performances on its two stages into the early morning. Pellegrino introduced a two-stage setup to maintain a continuous flow of live music, allowing one band to begin playing as soon as the other finishes, minimizing downtime throughout the night. Carl Weathersby, Linsey Alexander, Eddie Shaw, Mike Wheeler, Peaches Staten, and Ronnie Hicks are regular performers. Joanna Connor has played at the club regularly since 2005. The Rolling Stones performed at the club in 1978. A long-standing tradition at Kingston Mines is the Sunday night Blues Jam that is free to join, and anyone can participate.

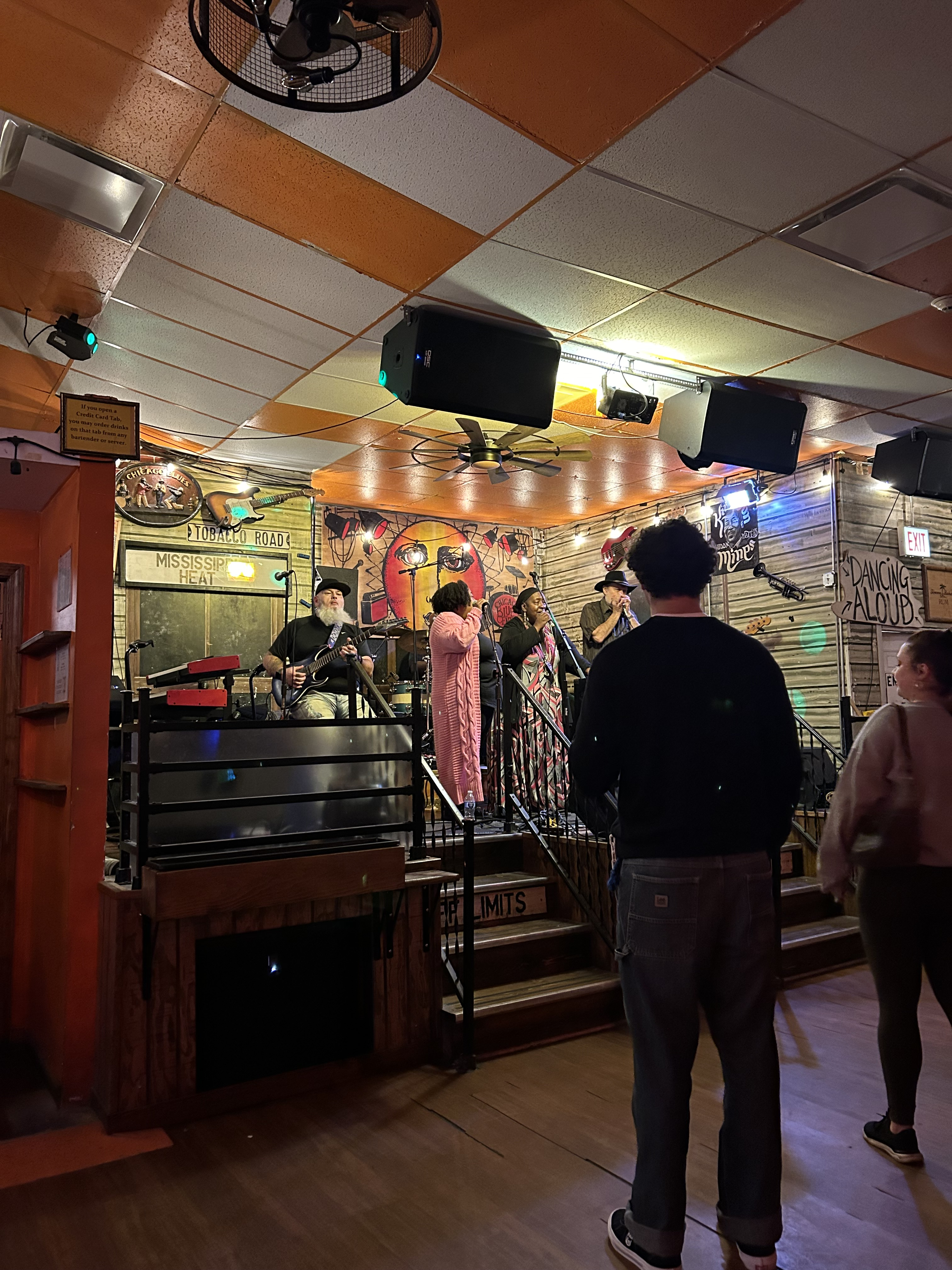
Kingston Mines Main Stage

== Awards ==
- 2014 - "Keeping the Blues Alive Award for Blues Clubs" by the Blues Foundation
- 2016 - Chicago Reader's Best Blues Club
- 2016 - Chicago Music Awards Most Popular Blues Club Award
- 2016 - Torch Bearer of Blues in Chicago
- 2019 - TripAdvisor Certificate of Excellence
- 2019 - Chicago Concierge Favorites Award
