= Stepping Out (Steve Laury album) =

Studio album by Steve Laury
- Released: 1990
- Recorded: 1990
- Genre: Jazz
- Length: 48:27
- Label: Denon Records
- Producer: Steve Laury

Steve Laury chronology
Come and Get It (with Fattburger) (1990)	Stepping Out (1990)	Passion (1991)

Stepping Out is an album by American guitarist Steve Laury released in 1990, and recorded for Denon Records. Stepping Out is Laury's first solo album, and his first album after leaving the group Fattburger. The album reached #14 on Billboard's Contemporary Jazz chart.

== Track listing ==
1. Stepping Out (Steve Laury) - 4:35
2. All Because of You (Steve Laury / Ron Satterfield) - 5:40
3. Kiss Me Goodbye (Steve Laury) - 4:44
4. Soulful Eyes (Steve Lauty / Ron Satterfield) - 4:21
5. Just Like An Angel (Steve Laury) - 4:40
6. Walk Your Talk (Steve Laury / Ron Satterfield) - 5:26
7. Mañana (Steve Laury) - 5:59
8. Shakedown (Steve Laury / Ron Satterfield) - 3:55
9. The Day She Went Away (Steve Laury) - 3:05

== Personnel ==
- Steve Laury - guitar
- Ron Satterfield - keyboards, vocals
- Duncan Moore - drums, percussion
- Kevin Hennessey - bass
- Rob Whitlock - keyboards, bass
- John Rekevics - saxophone, flute

== Charts ==
Chart (1990)	Peak position
Billboard Jazz Albums	14
