= Peter Harper (musician) =

American singer-songwriter

Peter D Harper
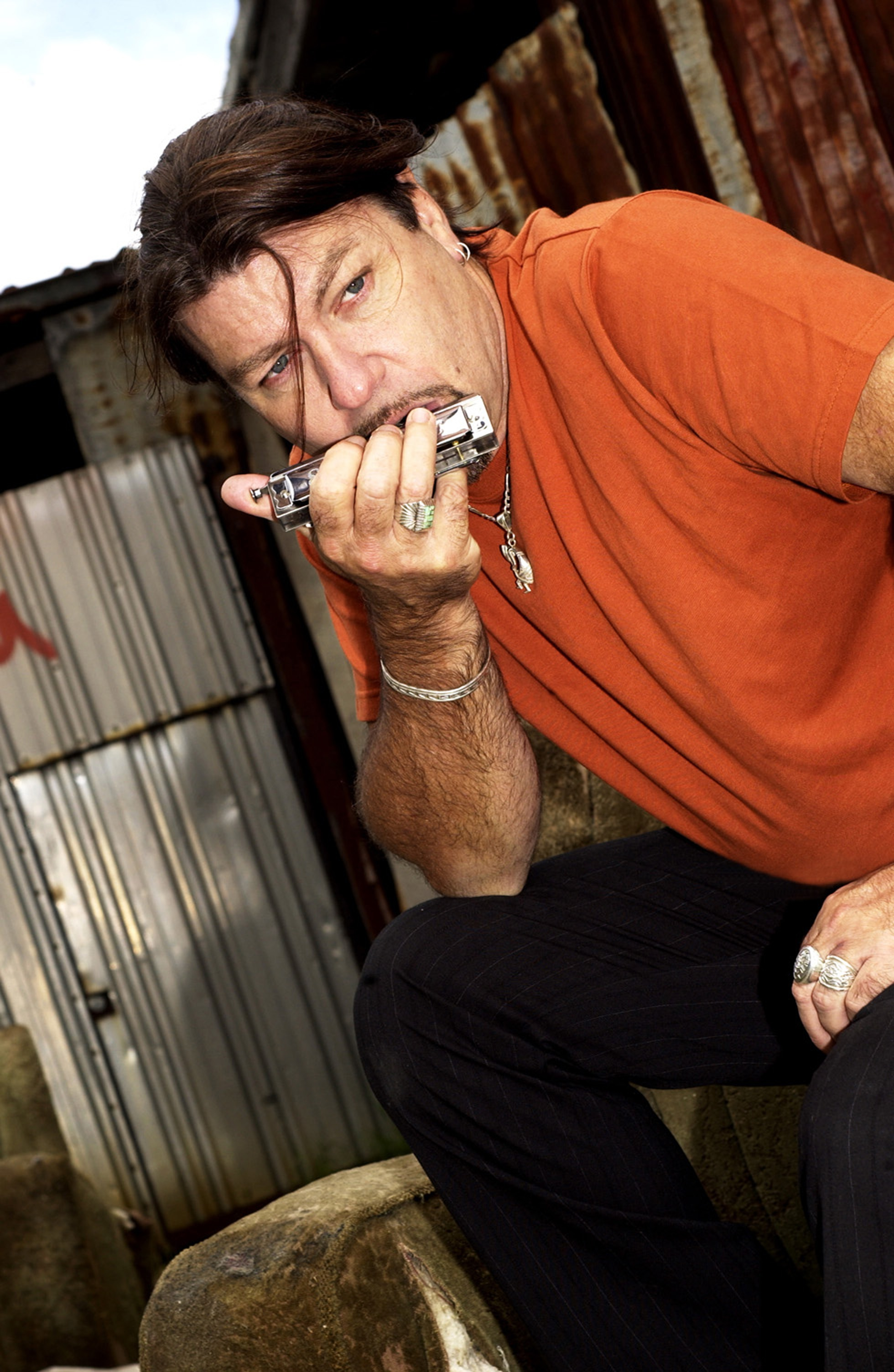
- Peter D. Harper playing chromatic harp

Background information
- Also known as: Harper
- Born: Peter D. Harper; 10 November 1970 (age 55); Guildford, Surrey, England
- Origin: Perth, Western Australia
- Genres: Blues rock
- Occupations: Harmonicist, singer, songwriter, record producer
- Instruments: Harmonica, didgeridoo, djembe, keyboards, vocals
- Years active: 1990s–present
- Labels: Full Moon Records, Nibelung Records, Blind Pig Records, Bluharp Records

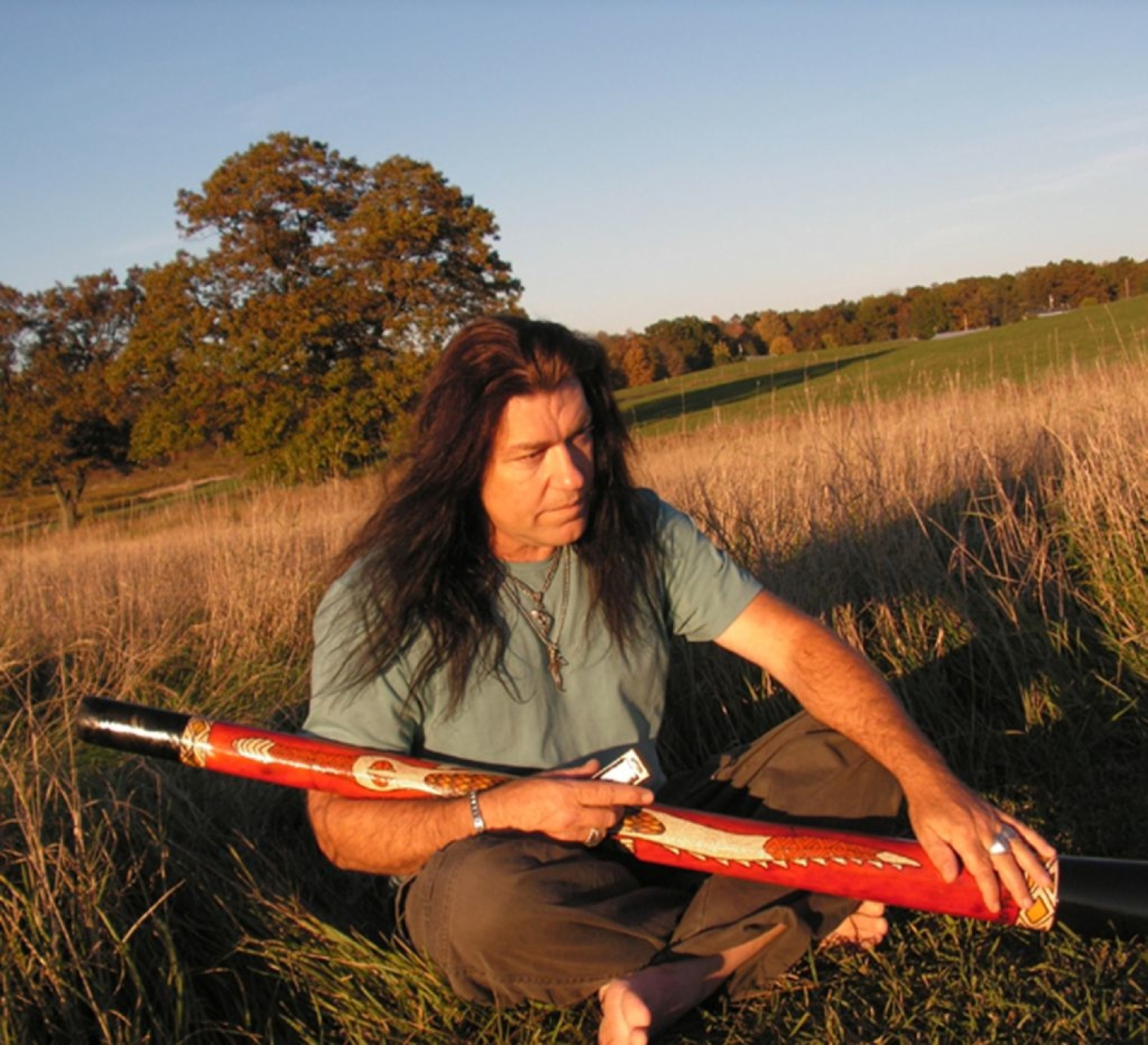
Peter D. Harper with his didgeridoo in D from Day by Day

Peter D. Harper (born 10 November 1970) is an Australian-American blues rock harmonica player, singer and songwriter. His unique slant on the blues and roots music genre includes his use of the Australian indigenous instrument - the didgeridoo. Harper has received 14 Music Awards in four different countries including a Gold Record. Billed with his backing band as Harper and Midwest Kind, his 2020 Rise Up album debuted at No.3 on the Billboard Blues Album Charts. Rise Up was listed in the Top 20 Albums of 2020 by Blues Blast Magazine USA. Rise Up has been nominated as Best Modern Roots Album by Independent Blues Awards, 2021 and Harper and Midwest Kind has also been nominated as Best Modern Roots Band. Rise Up followed Show Your Love which debuted at No. 9, and peaked at No. 3 in the US Billboard Blues Albums chart plus a 25 week run in the Top Ten.

His interest in the blues was inspired by his grandfather's record collection which included work by Howlin' Wolf, Sonny Boy Williamson II, Muddy Waters, and Little Walter.

== Life and career ==
Peter D.Harper was born in Guildford, Surrey, England, but relocated with his parents to Perth, Western Australia at the age of 10. In the late 1970s he played in a brass band learning to play the euphonium and trumpet. Harper released six CDs in Australia. In 1987, "Sailing Australia" (America's Cup Theme) peaked at number 71 on the Australian chart; becoming his first charting single.

Harper also performed with the King Pins, the Magnificent Seven, West of the Wall, the Flirts, the Mods, and Good Horse before, in the early 1990s, forming Blue Devil. They performed for several years prior to recording their debut album, Tears of Ice, which was released by Newmarket Records. Yesterday Is Over (Shock Records, 1996) followed before Harper parted company with Blue Devil.

His debut solo album was self-released in 1997, called Live at the Soup Kitchen recorded in Detroit, Michigan. Glass on the Stepping Stone (Full Moon Records, 2000) was his next release, which allowed Harper full control over the songwriting, arrangement and production. He toured in the United States from 1997 onward promoting both albums, and supported John Mayall & the Bluesbreakers, Koko Taylor, Little Feat, Buddy Guy, and Robert Cray. Harper signed another deal with the German record label Nibelung Records in 2000. After signing with USA label, Blind Pig Records in 2004, Harper, permanently relocating to the United States in 2005. Harper's USA debut recording Down to the Rhythm (2005) followed by Day by Day (2007) and Stand Together (2010), were issued by Blind Pig Records.

Live at the Blues Museum (2012), was released through Blu Harp Records. The next studio recording with Midwest Kind was Show Your Love, which debuted at No 9, peaking at No 3 on the US Billboard Blues Albums Chart. It has had a chart run of over six months.

== Discography ==
=== Albums ===
| Year | Title | Record label | Billed as |
|---|---|---|---|
| 1997 | Live at the Soup Kitchen | Self-released | Harper |
| 2000 | Glass on the Stepping Stone | Full Moon Records | Harper |
| 2002 | Live at St. Andrews | Full Moon Records | Harper |
| 2003 | Way Down Deep Inside | Full Moon Records | Harper |
| 2005 | Down to the Rhythm | Blind Pig Records | Harper |
| 2007 | Day by Day | Blind Pig Records | Harper |
| 2010 | Stand Together | Blind Pig Records | Harper |
| 2012 | Live at the Blues Museum | Bluharp Records | Harper and Midwest Kind |
| 2013 | Bare Bones | Bluharp Records | Harper and Motor City Josh |
| 2016 | Show Your Love | Bluharp Records | Harper and Midwest Kind |
| 2020 | Rise Up | Access Records | Harper and Midwest Kind |
