= Jimmy Thackery =

American blues singer, guitarist and songwriter (born 1953)

- Birth name: James Thackery
- Born: May 19, 1953 (age 72); Pittsburgh, Pennsylvania, United States
- Genres: Blues, rock
- Occupation(s): Musician, songwriter
- Instrument(s): Vocals, electric guitar
- Years active: 1972–present
- Labels: Blind Pig Records, Seymour Records
- Website: Jimmy Thackery's website

Jimmy Thackery (born May 19, 1953, Pittsburgh, Pennsylvania, United States) is an American blues singer, guitarist and songwriter.

== Career ==
Thackery spent fourteen years as part of The Nighthawks, the Washington, D.C.–based blues and roots rock ensemble. After leaving the Nighthawks in 1986, Thackery toured under his own name.

Born in Pittsburgh and raised in Washington, Thackery co-founded The Nighthawks with Mark Wenner in 1972 and went on to record over twenty albums with them. In 1986 he began touring with The Assassins, a six-piece original blues, rock and R&B ensemble which he had previously helped start as a vacation band when The Nighthawks took one of their rare breaks. Originally billed as Jimmy Thackery and The Assassins, the band toured the U.S. Northeast, Mid-Atlantic, South, and Texas regions. The Assassins released a variety of recordings on the Seymour record label, two on vinyl (No Previous Record and Partners in Crime) and the 1989 CD Cut Me Loose.

In the wake of the Assassins 1991 break-up, Thackery has been leading a trio, Jimmy Thackery and the Drivers, whose early recordings were for the San Francisco, California based Blind Pig Records. In 2002 Thackery released, We Got It, his first album on Telarc and in 2006, In the Natural State with Earl and Ernie Cate on Rykodisc. In 2007, he released Solid Ice again with The Drivers. His latest album, Spare Keys, was released in 2016.

== Discography ==
- 1992: Empty Arms Motel (Blind Pig 5001)
- 1993: Sideways in Paradise (with John Mooney) (Blind Pig 5006) reissue
- 1994: Trouble Man (Blind Pig 5011)
- 1995: Wild Night Out! [live] (Blind Pig 5021)
- 1996: Drive To Survive (Blind Pig 5035)
- 1996: Partners in Crime (with Tom Principato) (VooDoo [Fr] 112)
- 1998: Switching Gears (Blind Pig 5045)
- 2000: Sinner Street (Blind Pig 5065)
- 2000: That's It! (with David Raitt) (Blue Rock'it 132)
- 2002: We Got It (Telarc 83540)
- 2002: Whiskey Store (with Tab Benoit) (Telarc 83559)
- 2003: True Stories (Telarc 83572)
- 2003: Guitar (Blind Pig 5083) compilation; all instrumental
- 2004: Whiskey Store Live! (with Tab Benoit) (Telarc 83584)
- 2005: Healin' Ground (Telarc 83624)
- 2006: In the Natural State (with the Cate Brothers) (Rykodisc 10871)
- 2006: The Essential Jimmy Thackery (Blind Pig 8008) compilation
- 2007: Solid Ice (Telarc 83661)
- 2008: Live! 2008
- 2008: Inside Tracks (Telarc 83683)
- 2010: Live in Detroit – Big Long Buick (White River 1919)
- 2011: Feel the Heat (White River 1920)
- 2012: As Live As It Gets (Jamthack; no catalog number)
- 2014: Wide Open (White River 1923)
- 2014: Extra Jimmies (Blind Pig 8014) compilation
- 2016: Spare Keys (White River 1953)

=== Seymour releases ===
- 1985: Jimmy Thackery & John Mooney, Sideways in Paradise (Seymour [LP], no #) note: recorded while still with The Nighthawks
- 1986: The Assassins, No Previous Record (Seymour [LP], no #)
- 1987: The Assassins, Partners in Crime (Seymour [LP], no #)
- 1989: The Assassins, Cut Me Loose (Seymour, SRCD-0004)

== See also ==
- The Nighthawks
