= Colin Dussault's Blues Project =

American blues-rock group

- Origin: Cleveland, Ohio, United States
- Genre: Blues rock
- Years active: 1989–present
- Label: Erica Records/Buddha Belly Productions
- Members: Colin Dussault; Jimmy Feeney; Brent Lane; Steve Zavesky; John Atzberger
- Website: www.colindussault.com

Colin Dussault's Blues Project is a blues rock group formed in 1989 in Cleveland, Ohio. Their five current members are Colin Dussault, Jimmy Feeney, Brent Lane, Steve Zavesky, John Atzberger.

The band plays harmonica-led blues, rock, and soul.

== History ==
The Blues Project's first show was at the Ultimate Sports Bar in Lakewood, Ohio, on May 13, 1989. The band has performed in Greater Cleveland as an opener for blues and rock artists.

Dussault performed with the band Night Bridge at a July 1998 political fundraiser for U.S. Senate candidate Mary O. Boyle, which was attended by President Bill Clinton and First Lady Hillary Clinton. Dussault's band also performed at the 2004 Election Eve Rally for presidential candidate John Kerry, held at Mall C in Downtown Cleveland on November 1, 2004.

Dussault has released 11 compact disc recordings on his own Erica Records/Buddha Belly Productions label. In 2018, Dussault released a single, "A Song for Our Children", written following the Parkland high school shooting. Proceeds from the single were donated to Moms Demand Action for Gun Sense in America.

=== Awards ===
- Best Regional Blues Band, Cleveland Scene Reader's Poll (1998)
- Best Harmonica Player, Cleveland Free Times Music Awards (2000)
- Best Blues Band, Cleveland Free Times Music Awards (2004, 2005, 2006, 2008)

== Bibliography ==
- Benson, John. "You Should Hear," Cleveland Plain Dealer, December 16, 2005.
- Benson, John. "Bud Man," Cleveland Scene, November 19–25, 1998, page 42.
- Bruening, John C. Cleveland Scene, Regional Recordings review, September 8–14, 1995.
- Cassady, Charles. "Bluesman bounces back after ailment to keep playing." [West Life], July 23, 2008.
- Cielec, Greg. "Cool Cleveland Sounds" CD review, Cool Cleveland, December 14, 2005.
- Ferris, D. X. "Makin' The Scene: A Very Bluesy Birthday" Cleveland Scene, May 13, 2009.
- Feur, Alan. "Luring a Star: Big City Beckons; Cleveland Begs." The New York Times, Saturday, June 5, 2010.
- Garrigue, Andy. "Old Style Fits Newcomer," Hohner Harmonica Easy Reeding, Fall 1996, page 14.
- Holan, Mark. "An On-The-Job Training Course in the Blues," Cleveland Scene Local Spotlight, date unknown.
- Johnson, Kevin C. "Off the Record." Akron Beacon Journal, "Enjoy!" August 15, 1996.
- Lloyd, Phil. "Colin Dussault's Blues Project: Cool In Cleveland," American Harmonica Newsletter, August 1998, Volume 9, Number 8.
- Pantsios, Anastasia. "Almost Famous" Local Only article Cleveland Scene, Thursday December 22, 1998.
- Price, Ann (March 28, 2007). "Interview with Colin Dussault". About Cleveland. Archived from the original on May 21, 2007.
- Rawls, Alex. "New Orleans Still Struggles-In Song-With Katrina," The Village Voice, Aug. 27, 2008.
- Scott, Jane (May 26, 1995). "Like Father, Like Son". The Plain Dealer. Cleveland.
- Vickers, Jim. "Local Sounds CD review" Cleveland Magazine, November 2004.
- Vozar, Roger. "Future Looking Rosy For Blues Band," Lakewood Sun Post, May 18, 1995.
- Vozar, Roger. "The Lure of Music Keeps this Mover Singing the Blues." Sun Herald, June 9, 1994, Section C.
- Cleveland Scene, "Callin' Dussault," November 14–20, 2007, Page 17.
- "Night Life: Hurricane Katrina/New Orleans benefit". The Columbus Dispatch. February 2, 2006. p. 8.
- "Cover Story: Colin Dussault's Blues Assault". Sandusky Register Funcoast Magazine. April 5, 2007.
- Hohner Harmonica Easy Reading Newsletter, Spring 2000, page 2.
- Living Blues Magazine, March/April 2006, Short Takes, CD review
- Peanuts (February 1996). "Review: Colin Dussault's Blues Project, Recorded Live At The Brothers Lounge". Jazz & Blues Report (208).
- The Intelligencer & Wheeling News Register Supplement, August 10, 11, 12, 2006, page 3.
