= Jack Benny filmography =

This is a list of films featuring comedian Jack Benny. Benny's career lasted from the early 20th century until his death in 1974. In Jack Benny's first film, he starred along with Conrad Nagel as master of ceremonies in The Hollywood Revue of 1929, which was a big role for Jack at the time. Benny would not start getting well known until his own radio program in 1934. The Hollywood Revue is also the oldest known form of Jack Benny in color, with the last sequence being filmed originally in color, which was common for a musical in 1929.

Title	Year	Company	Roles	Notes
The Hollywood Revue of 1929	1929	Metro-Goldwyn-Mayer (MGM)	Himself – master of ceremonies	
Chasing Rainbows	1930	MGM	Eddie Rock	
The Rounder	1930	MGM	Mr. Bartlett	(short film)
Lord Byron of Broadway	1930	MGM	Voice on Radio	Uncredited
Children of Pleasure	1930	MGM	Himself – Radio Performer	Uncredited
The Medicine Man	1930	Tiffany Pictures	Dr. John Harvey	
A Broadway Romeo	1931	Paramount Pictures	Himself	(short film)
Cab Waiting	1931	Paramount Pictures	Himself	(short film)
Taxi Tangle	1931	Paramount Pictures	Himself	(short film)
Mr. Broadway	1933	Arthur Greenblatt	Himself	
Transatlantic Merry-Go-Round	1934	Edward Small Productions	Chad Denby	
Broadway Melody of 1936	1935	MGM	Bert Keeler	
It's in the Air	1935	MGM	Calvin Churchill	
The Big Broadcast of 1937	1936	Paramount Pictures	Jack Carson	
College Holiday	1936	Paramount Pictures	J. Davis Bowster	
Artists and Models	1937	Paramount Pictures	Mac Brewster	
Artists and Models Abroad	1938	Paramount Pictures	Buck Boswell	
Man About Town	1939	Paramount Pictures	Bob Temple	
Buck Benny Rides Again	1940	Paramount Pictures	Himself	
Love Thy Neighbor	1940	Paramount Pictures	Himself	(first Jack Benny/ Fred Allen feud film)
Charley's Aunt	1941	20th Century-Fox	Babbs Babberley	
To Be or Not to Be	1942	United Artists	Joseph Tura	
George Washington Slept Here	1942	Warner Bros.	Bill Fuller	
Casablanca	1942	Warner Bros.	Patron at Rick's	Uncredited brief cameo
The Meanest Man in the World	1943	20th Century-Fox	Richard Clarke	
Hollywood Canteen	1944	Warner Bros.	Himself	
The Horn Blows at Midnight	1945	Warner Bros.	Athanael	(Benny's last starring role in a feature film; film's box office failure became long-running gag on the Jack Benny Program)
It's in the Bag!	1945	United Artists	Himself	(last Benny/Fred Allen feud film)
Without Reservations	1946	RKO Radio Pictures	Himself	Uncredited
The Great Lover	1949	Paramount Pictures	Himself	Uncredited
Screen Snapshots: The Great Showman	1950	Columbia Pictures	Himself	(short film)
You Can Change the World	1951	The Christophers	Himself	(short film)
Screen Snapshots: Memorial to Al Jolson	1952	Columbia Pictures	Himself – Narrator	(short film)
Somebody Loves Me	1952	Paramount Pictures	Himself	(cameo)
Screen Snapshots: Hollywood's Great Entertainers	1953	Columbia Pictures	Himself	(short film)
Screen Snapshots: Hollywood Beauty	1955	Columbia Pictures	Himself	(short film)
Screen Snapshots: The Walter Winchell Party	1957	Columbia Pictures	Himself	(short film)
Beau James	1957	Paramount Pictures	Himself	Uncredited
Rock-a-Bye Baby	1958	Paramount Pictures	Carlos, the matador	Uncredited
The Mouse That Jack Built	1959	Warner Bros.	Himself	(cartoon short)
Who Was That Lady?	1960	Columbia Pictures	Mr. Cosgrove	Uncredited
Gypsy	1962	Warner Bros.	Himself	Uncredited, portraying himself in the early vaudeville days
It's a Mad, Mad, Mad, Mad World	1963	United Artists	Man in Car in Desert	Uncredited (small part)
A Guide for the Married Man	1967	20th Century Fox	Technical Adviser (Ollie 'Sweet Lips')	(cameo)
Swing Out, Sweet Land	1970	Batjac Productions	Man Who Finds Silver Dollar	(small role)
The Man	1972	Paramount Pictures	Himself	(final film role, later years focused on concerts and television)
