= David Gerald =

American blues rock musician (born 1968)

- Born: 1968 (age 57–58); Detroit, Michigan, U.S.
- Occupation: Blues rock musician

David Gerald (born 1968) is an American blues rock musician.

== Early life ==
Born in 1968, David Gerald is a native of Detroit, Michigan, where his parents moved from their home in Mississippi during the mid-1950s. He began playing the guitar at the age of fifteen, first learning rock music before taking on the blues, on repaired guitars he received from a neighbor.

== Musical career ==
While mainly a guitarist, Gerald also plays the drums, bass, and keyboards. He travels and tours as the front man of his eponymous David Gerald Band. He released his first album Hell and Back in 2009, which reached the number one position on the Roots Music Report's Blues Chart, staying in the top twenty for several weeks. He also reached the top of the ReverbNation Michigan blues charts, and the album received national radio play. The album contains ten tracks, including five originals and five live covers.

In April 2018, he then released his second album, N2U. Gerald performs guitar, bass and drums on all the studio recordings, the album also featured Ronald Thieleman on bass and Geoff Kinde on drums on the live cover recordings of "Hug You Squeeze You" and "Willie the Wimp".
