= Cale Tyson =

American indie/folk musician

Cale Tyson is an American indie/folk musician originally from Fort Worth, Texas, now based out of Nashville, Tennessee. In 2013, Tyson released his EP High on Lonesome and another EP Cheater's Wine in 2014. Rolling Stone wrote that the two EP's “have documented his version of mournful Texas twang, where the steel guitar does the wailing and honky-tonk vamps keep it danceable instead of dreary.” In March 2017, Tyson released a special edition compilation vinyl featuring songs from his two previous EPs High on Lonesome and Cheater's Wine titled Introducing Cale Tyson.

Tyson released his first full-length album, Careless Soul, in July 2017. While Careless Soul was made up of traditional country elements, Cale Tyson took his music in a new direction in January 2019 when he released his latest EP “narcissist”. Writing about the EP Rolling Stone wrote “This bedroom recording trades the old-world twang of Cale Tyson’s past for something more evocative of Elliott Smith’s dark, depressed ballads.” And NPR wrote, “Turns away from country influences and toward Harry Nilsson, Elliott Smith and early Bright Eyes.”

== Discography ==
Studio albums

- Careless Soul (2017, Clubhouse Records)

EPs

- High On Lonesome (2013, County Q Productions)
- Cheater's Wine (2014, self-released)
- narcissist (2019, self-released)

Compilations

- Introducing Cale Tyson (2017, Knife Tapes)
