= Popa Chubby =

American singer, composer, and guitarist

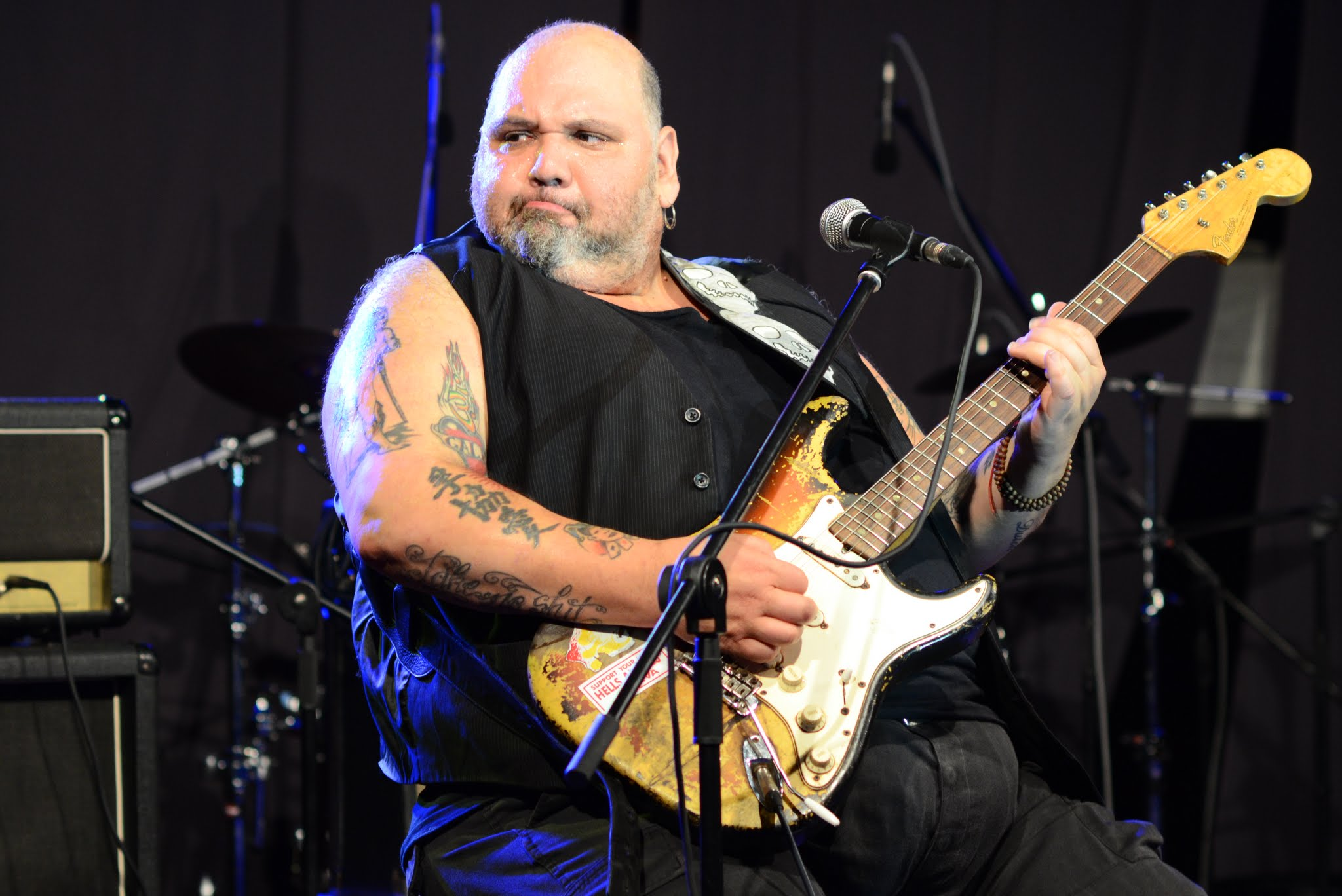
- Popa Chubby in 2012

Background information
- Born: Theodore Joseph Horowitz; March 31, 1960 (age 65)
- Origin: The Bronx, New York City, United States
- Genres: Blues; rock; blues rock
- Instruments: Guitar, vocals, drums
- Years active: 1987–present
- Labels: Cleopatra Blues, a division of Cleopatra Records, Okeh, Prime, Lightyear, Shanachie, Blind Pig

Popa Chubby, (pronounced POP'-uh) stage name of Theodore Joseph "Ted" Horowitz (born March 31, 1960), is an American singer, composer, and guitarist.

== Life and career ==
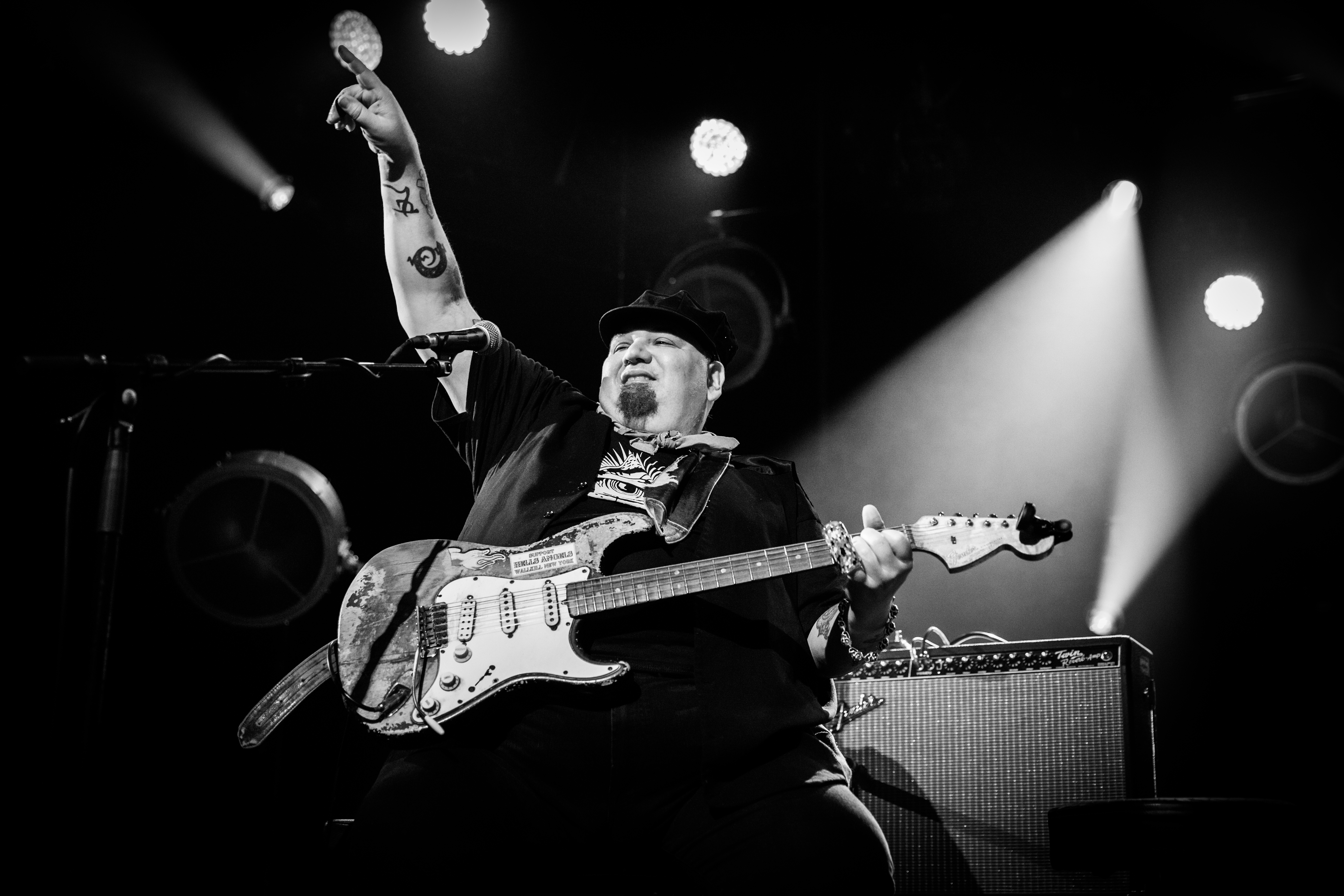
Popa Chubby live at Leverkusener Jazztage 2016

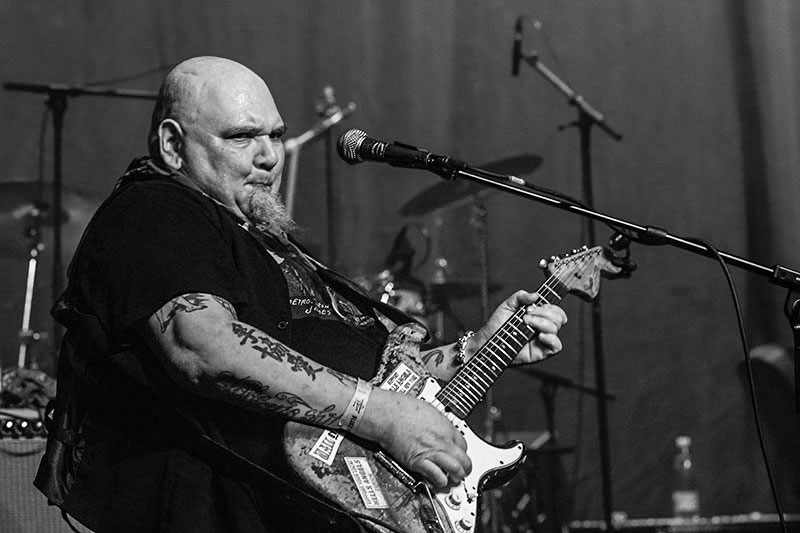
Blues Heaven Festival (2018 Denmark)

At age thirteen Horowitz began playing drums; shortly thereafter, he began listening to the music of the Rolling Stones and started playing guitar. Although he grew up in the 1970s, Horowitz was influenced by artists of the 1960s, including Jimi Hendrix and Cream, among others.

In his early twenties, although mainly playing blues music, he also worked as backing for punk rock poet Richard Hell. Horowitz first came to public attention after winning a national blues talent search sponsored by KLON, a public radio station in Long Beach, California, which is now known as KKJZ. In 1989, he appeared, as Ted Horowitz, as guitarist on Pierce Turner's Sky & the Ground. He won the New Artist of the Year award and as a result was chosen as the opening act at the Long Beach Blues Festival in 1992. Horowitz played more than 200 club dates a year through the 1990s.

In 1994, Horowitz released several albums on his own Laughing Bear label, including It's Chubby Time and Gas Money, before he obtained a recording contract with Sony Music/Okeh Records. Booty and the Beast, his first major-label album, produced by Atlantic Records engineer/producer Tom Dowd, who worked on recordings for artists such as Aretha Franklin, Ray Charles, and Wilson Pickett, was released in 1995. In 1996, a live recording, Hit the High Hard One, was released on the Prime-CD label, along with re-releases of his first two albums. Two years later, One Million Broken Guitars was released on Lightyear Records; Brooklyn Basement Blues followed in 1999.

In 2000, Horowitz signed with Blind Pig Records and released How'd a White Boy Get the Blues? in 2001. It turned out to be a slight departure from Horowitz's usual musical direction, incorporating elements of contemporary pop and hip-hop. The Good, the Bad and the Chubby, released in 2002, was an example of the development of Horowitz's songwriting skills and included the 9/11 commentary "Somebody Let the Devil Out". Blind Pig released a collection of early Horowitz recordings, The Hungry Years, in 2003. A year later, Horowitz released Peace, Love and Respect.

Two albums previously available only in France – Live at FIP and Wild – were compiled by the Blind Pig label and released as Big Man, Big Guitar in 2005, followed by Stealing the Devil's Guitar a year later. The Fight Is On, was Horowitz's first studio album after a two-year hiatus. It was released in February 2010 on the Provogue label in Europe, and Blind Pig in North America. A world tour followed.

In 2008, Horowitz and his ex-wife Galea recorded Vicious Country, which was released on the Dixiefrog label. Vicious Country was chosen as 'Record of the Week' by the French Canal+ television station in March 2009.

In 2015, he released Big Bad and Beautiful, a two-disc live CD recorded in France with Dave Keyes on keyboards and Francesco and Andrea Beccaro playing bass and drums respectively. In 2016, he released The Catfish on the French Verycords label and on PCP Productions in North America. This record yielded both the 3D animated video of the title track by Laurent Mercier of Callicore, and the tribute Blues For Charlie. In 2017, he released Two Dogs, again on Verycords for Europe and PCP Productions in North America. In 2018, Eagletone Custom released the Popa Chubby Tribute Stratocaster, a replica of his '66.

In 2019, Verycords released a limited edition two-CD anthology Prime Cuts, chosen by Popa Chubby. He made his Edinburgh Jazz & Blues Festival debut on 14 July 2019. His current band line up includes Stefano Giudici (drums), Max Barrett (bass), Dave Keyes (keyboards), as well as a recurring cast of musicians.

In 2025, Gulf Coast Records released Popa Chubby & Friends “I (Heart) Freddie King", an album of Freddie King covers featuring guests including Joe Bonamassa, Eric Gales, Mike Zito, Christone “Kingfish” Ingram and others.

== Discography ==
- The First Cuts (a collection of early material)
- The Hungry Years (another collection of early material)
- It's Chubby Time (1994)
- Gas Money (1994)
- Booty and the Beast (1995)
- Hit the High Hard One – Live (1996)
- One Million Broken Guitars (1998)
- Brooklyn Basement Blues (1999)
- One Night Live In New York City (1999)
- How'd a White Boy Get the Blues? (2001)
- Flashed Back (feat. Galea) (2001)
- The Good, the Bad and the Chubby (2001)
- Live at FIP (2002)
- Old School: Popa Chubby & Friends Play Muddy, Willie and More (2003)
- Peace, Love & Respect (2003)
- Wild Live! (2004)
- Big Man, Big Guitar: Popa Chubby Live (2005) compilation
- Stealing the Devil's Guitar (2006)
- Electric Chubbyland (2006, 3-CD box set)
- Deliveries After Dark (2008)
- Vicious Country (feat. Galea) (2008)
- The Fight Is On (2009)
- Back to New York City (2011)
- Universal Breakdown Blues (2013)
- I'm Feelin' Lucky: The Blues According to Popa Chubby (2014)
- Big, Bad and Beautiful – Live (2015, 2-CD set)
- The Catfish (2016)
- Two Dogs (2017)
- Prime Cuts: The Very Best of the Beast from the East (2019, limited edition 2-CD set)
- It's a Mighty Hard Road (Dixie Frog, 2020)
- Tinfoil Hat (Dixie Frog, 2021)
- Emotional Gangster (Dixie Frog, 2022)
- Live At G. Bluey’s Juke Joint NYC (Gulf Coast, 2023, 2-CD set)
- I (Heart) Freddie King (Gulf Coast, 2025)

== DVDs ==
- Popa Chubby in Concert – Ohne Filter – Musik Pur (2002)
- The Official Popa Chubby DVD – Live Performances – Interviews – Video Clips – Extras (2002)
- Popa Chubby – Plays the Music of Jimi Hendrix – At the File 7 – Electric Chubbyland (2007)
