= The Rounders (band) =

- Origin: Oklahoma City, Oklahoma, United States
- Genres: Blues rock, roots rock
- Years active: 2000–2008; 2018–present
- Labels: Blind Pig Records

The Rounders was an American roots rock/blues rock band, based in Oklahoma City, that formed during the summer of 2000.

The original line-up consisted of Brian Whitten (vocals, kazoo), Dave Spindle (guitar), Ryan Taylor (guitar), Adam Enevoldsen (bass), and Stuart Williamson (drums). Their first album, Little Bitty Can of Worms, independently released in 2003, was recorded at Bell Labs Recording Studio in Norman, Oklahoma. The album is an eclectic mix of original jug band music, hokum, alt.country, Chicago style and Mississippi Delta blues.

Shortly after the release of Little Bitty Can of Worms, bassist/songwriter Adam Enevoldsen left the band to pursue other musical endeavors. The group subsequently became a four-piece with Dave Spindle taking over the bass duties. 2004 saw the independent release of their second album, Now-a-Day Songs. The title of the album came from a book of poetry, Now-A-Day Poems, by early 20th-century poet Philander Chase Johnson. During the fall of 2005, The Rounders added local guitar player Michael Stone to their line-up.

In 2006, the band signed with Blind Pig Records. Their first national release, Wish I Had You, debuted on January 26, 2007. On February 29, 2008, The Rounders disbanded.

M. Kemper has provided the cover art for all three Rounders' albums.

== Members ==
- Brian Whitten (vocals, kazoo)
- Ryan Taylor (guitar)
- Michael Stone (guitar)
- Dave Spindle (bass)
- Stuart Williamson (drums)

== Discography ==
Year	Title	Label
2003	Little Bitty Can of Worms	Self-released
2004	Now-a-Day Songs	Self-released
2007	Wish I Had You	Blind Pig Records
