= Bastard Sons of Johnny Cash =

US band formed 1995

Bastard Sons of Johnny Cash are an Americana/alternative country band formed in San Diego, California, in 1995. It is led by singer Mark Stuart. They received permission to use Cash's name by Cash himself, and were then personally invited to record songs for their first CD Walk Alone at Cash's home in Hendersonville, Tennessee. The Bastard Sons of Johnny Cash have opened for Merle Haggard, and Willie Nelson at his annual 4th of July concert, and shared the stage with such notables as Buck Owens, John Hiatt, Lucinda Williams, George Jones, and Steve Earle.

== Members ==
- Mark Stuart – vocals, guitar
- Vance Hazen – bass guitar
- Lars Albrecht – guitar
- Jim Adair – drums

Former members

- Dean Cote – guitar
- Joey Galvan – drums
- Clark Stacer – bass guitar
- Buzz Campbell – guitar
- Johnny D'Artenay – bass guitar
- Alex Watts – guitar
- Scott B. Hall – steel guitar/dobro
- Jeff Roberts – bass guitar

== Discography ==
- Bastard Sons of Johnny Cash (1996, BSOJC) their "6-song Demo EP"
- Lasso Motel (1999, BSOJC) original issue with a total of 9 songs
- Walk Alone (2001, Ultimatum Music/Artemis) reissue of Lasso Motel with 3 new recordings added on for a total of 12 songs; reissued later with a new total of 14 songs.
- Distance Between (2002, Ultimatum Music/Artemis)
- Live at the Belly Up (2003 [rel. 2009], Texacali)
- Mile Markers (2005, Texacali/Emergent/92e)
- Live at Muhle Hunzigen (2006, Texacali) DVD
- Road to Texacali (2007, Paul!/Radio Blast Recordings) compilation of Walk Alone, Distance Between, and Mile Markers.
- Live in Sweden (2008, Texacali) DVD
- Bend in the Road as Mark Stuart & the Bastard Sons (2009, Texacali/Dualtone)
- New Old Story (2013, RandM Records)
- Texicali Troubadour (2019, Mark Stuart solo album)
