= Joanna Connor =

American singer-songwriter (born 1962)

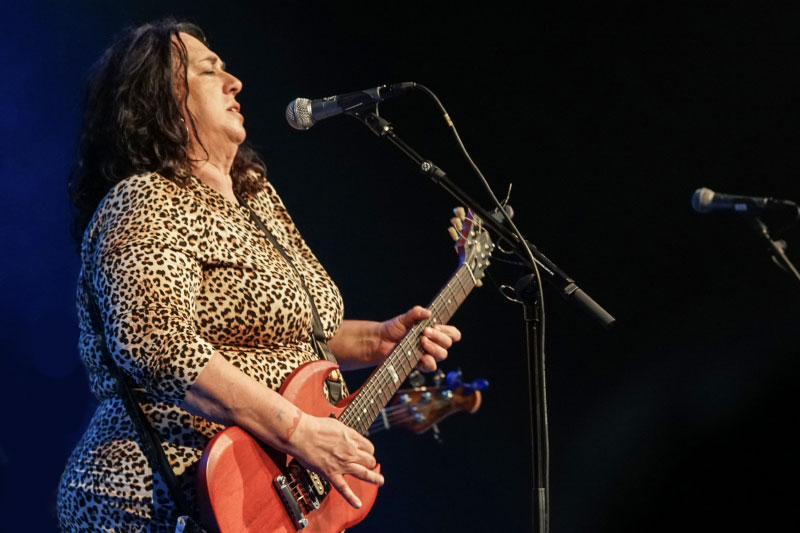
- Connor in 2018

Background information
- Born: August 31, 1962 (age 64); Brooklyn, New York, U.S.
- Origin: Chicago, Illinois, U.S.
- Genres: Blues, blues rock
- Occupations: Singer, guitarist, songwriter
- Instruments: Vocals, guitar
- Years active: 1980s–present
- Labels: Blind Pig, Ruf, M.C., Keeping the Blues Alive
- Website: joannaconnorguitar.com

Joanna Connor (born August 31, 1962) is an American Chicago-based blues singer, songwriter and guitarist.

== Early life ==
Connor was born in Brooklyn of New York City, and raised in Worcester, Massachusetts. After moving to Chicago in 1984, she was drawn to the Chicago blues scene, eventually sharing the stage with James Cotton, Junior Wells, Buddy Guy and A.C. Reed.

== Music career ==
By 1987, Connor had started her own band, and recorded her first album for Blind Pig Records in 1989.

In 2002, Connor left Blind Pig Records, and signed a recording contract with M.C. Records (a small independent record label).

In 2021, Connor released the No. 1 blues album 4801 South Indiana Avenue, via Joe Bonamassa's Keeping the Blues Alive Records.

While on tour in 2022, Connor performed live at Kingston Mines, a blues club.

In 2023, Connor was nominated for a Blues Music Award in the instrumentalist category, for guitar.

== Discography ==
=== Albums ===
- Believe It! (Blind Pig Records) (1989)
- Fight (Blind Pig Records) (1992)
- Living On The Road (1993)
- Rock & Roll Gypsy (Ruf Records) (1995)
- Big Girl Blues (Blind Pig Records) (1996)
- Slidetime (Blind Pig Records) (1998)
- Nothing But The Blues (live in Germany) (2001)
- The Joanna Connor Band (M.C. Records) (2002)
- Mercury Blues (M.C. Records) (2003)
- Unplugged at Carterco with Lance Lewis (Bluesblaster Records) (2008)
- Live 24 (live at Kingston Mines) (2010)
- Six String Stories (M.C. Records) (2016)
- Rise (M.C. Records) (2019)
- 4801 South Indiana Avenue (KTBA Records) (2021)
- Best of Me (Gulf Coast Records) (2023)

=== Singles ===
- "Slippin' Away" (Da Music/Deutsche Austrophon) (1995)
- "I Feel So Good" (KTBA Records) (2021)
