= Blind Pig Records =

- Parent company: Sony Music Entertainment
- Founded: 1977
- Founder: Jerry Del Giudice, Edward Chmelewski
- Distributor: The Orchard
- Genre: Blues, soul, zydeco
- Country of origin: United States
- Location: San Francisco, California
- Official website: blindpigrecords.com

Blind Pig Records is an American blues independent record label.

Blind Pig was formed in 1977 in Ann Arbor, Michigan, by Jerry Del Giudice, owner of the Blind Pig Cafe, and his friend Edward Chmelewski. The label is now based in San Francisco. In the late 2000s the label started a reissue vinyl series, featuring reissues from its back catalog on 180-gram high quality vinyl.

As of 2015, Blind Pig's catalogue is owned by The Orchard, a division of Sony Music.

In 2017, a double compilation album, Blind Pig Records 40th Anniversary Collection, was released featuring tracks by many artists who recorded for the label over the years.

== Roster ==
- Altered Five Blues Band
- Arthur Adams
- Luther Allison
- Reneé Austin
- Big James & the Chicago Playboys
- Carey Bell
- Elvin Bishop
- Deanna Bogart
- Billy Branch
- Nappy Brown
- Norton Buffalo
- Eddie C. Campbell
- Chubby Carrier
- The Cash Box Kings
- Tommy Castro
- Popa Chubby
- Otis Clay
- Deborah Coleman
- Joanna Connor
- James Cotton
- Albert Cummings
- Nick Curran & the Nitelifes
- Debbie Davies
- Sena Ehrhardt
- Damon Fowler
- The Gospel Hummingbirds
- Buddy Guy
- Zac Harmon
- Harper
- Shawn Holt & the Teardrops
- Dave Hole
- Big Walter Horton
- JW-Jones
- Peter Karp & Sue Foley
- Smokin' Joe Kubek featuring Bnois King
- Frankie Lee
- Little Mike and the Tornadoes
- Hamilton Loomis
- Magic Slim & the Teardrops
- Bob Margolin
- Coco Montoya
- John Mooney
- Big Bill Morganfield
- Charlie Musselwhite
- Kenny Neal
- John Németh
- Johnny Nicholas
- Pinetop Perkins
- Bill Perry
- Rod Piazza & the Mighty Flyers
- Snooky Pryor
- Robin Rogers
- Roy Rogers
- The Rounders
- Savoy Brown
- E.C. Scott
- Southern Hospitality
- Jeremy Spencer
- Studebaker John & the Hawks
- Jimmy Thackery & the Drivers
- Duke Tumatoe
- Muddy Waters
- Junior Wells
- Webb Wilder
- Reverend Billy C. Wirtz
- Mitch Woods & his Rocket 88s
