= Dark Season Blues =

Blues music festival in Svalbard, Norway

Coordinates: 78.22°N 15.65°E

- Genre: Blues
- Dates: annual in late October
- Locations: Longyearbyen, Norway
- Years active: 2003–present
- Website: www.svalbardblues.com

Dark Season Blues is an annual blues music festival in late October, at 78 degrees north in Longyearbyen (Svalbard) in Norway, and marks the beginning of the dark season when daylight and the sun is about to leave Svalbard for four winter months.

The festival lasts four days, and features local, Norwegian and international musicians performing in most of Longyearbyen's venues.

The festival is based on voluntary work in order to carry out the event. The economic goal is to break even, and any surplus is transferred to next year's festival.

The first Dark Season Blues festival was arranged in 2003, and has run without interruption until the COVID-19 pandemic resulted in the cancellation of the 2020 and 2021 festivals. It started out as a small intimate festival, and presented 15 bands spread on 17 events in 2010.

== Past performers ==
=== 2011 ===
Dark Season Blues 2011

- Bryan Lee (US)
- Mike Zito (US)
- JW-Jones (CA)
- Tina Lie (NO)
- Mike Andersen Band (DK)
- Micke & Lefty feat. Chef (FI)
- T-Bear & The Dukes of Rhythm (SE)
- Eric ‘Slim’ Zahl & the South West Swinger (NO)
- The Douglas Group (NO)
- Blåmyra (NO)
- Bright Side Five (NO)

=== 2010 ===
Dark Season Blues 2010

- The Reba Russel Band
- Victor Wainwright
- Cadillac Kings
- Grainne Duffy
- Knut Reiersrud
- Rita Engedalen & Margit Bakken with guests Tuva Syvertsen & Susanne Hansen
- Dave Fields
- Noora Noor
- Ledfoot / Tim Scott McConnell
- Linda Gail Lewis
- Bill Sims Jr
- Westby Band
- Deadwood
- Longyearbyen Storband
- Blaamyra

=== 2009 ===
Dark Season Blues 2009

- Bobby Jones
- Jackie Payne & Steve Edmondson band
- Billy Gibson feat Dave Fields
- JT. Lauritsen & The Buckshot Hunters
- Kirk Fletcher band
- Hemisfair
- Tinal Lie
- Groovy Company
- Joakim Tinderholt Express
- Blaamyra

=== 2008 ===
Dark Season Blues 2008

- Super Chikan
- Billy Gibson
- Sherman Robertson
- Greasy Gravy
- Bedrock Bluesband
- Monika Nordli m/band
- Rita Engedalen & Backbone
- Little Jenny & The Blue Beans
- Dr. Bekken
- Blackbirds
- Billy T Band
- Howlin’ Huskies
- Blaamyra Bluegrass

=== 2007 ===
Dark Season Blues 2007

- The Mannish Boys
- Dr.Bekken
- Spoonful of Blues
- Orbo & the longshots
- Trond Ytterbø Band
- Little Jenny & The Blue Beans
- Billy T Band
- Little Victor
- Steinar Albrigtsen & Monika Nordli
- Howlin’Huskies

=== 2006 ===
Dark Season Blues 2006

- Sherman Robertson
- Sky High
- Vidar Busk
- Kåre Virud Band
- Buzz Brothers
- Rita Engedalen & Margit Bakken
- J.T. Lauritsen Band
- The buzzers
- Varpen

=== 2005 ===
Dark Season Blues 2005

- Paal Flaata
- Frode Alnæs
- Peer Gynt Band
- Reidar Larsen & The Storytellers
- Rita Engedalen & Backbone
- Mitch Kasmar
- Rick Holmstrom
- Arsen Shomakhov
- Peter Price
- Spoonful of Blues
- RC Finnigan & The Blue Flames
- Billy T Band

=== 2004 ===
Dark Season Blues 2004

- Amund Maarud
- Kid Andersen
- RC Finnigan
- Erik Bergene
- Noise Pollution
- Fingerprint
- Good Time Charlie
- Dark Season All Star band

=== 2003 ===
Dark Season Blues 2003

- Knut Reiersrud
- JB and the Delta Jukes
- Allen’s Pit

== See also ==
- List of blues festivals
