= Marquise Knox =

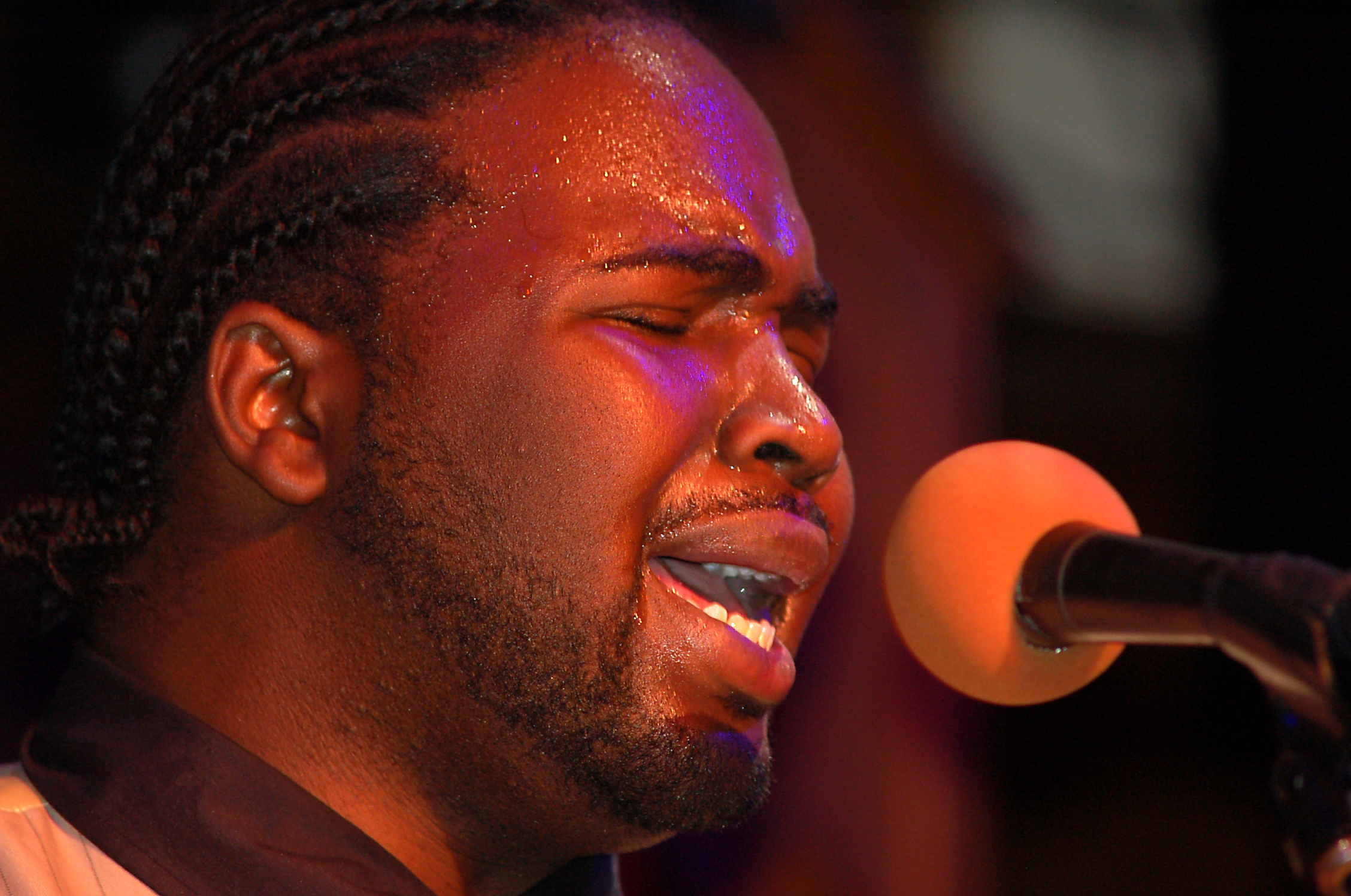
- Marquise Knox performing at the Blues Masters at the Crossroads concert in Salina, Kansas in October 2011

Background information
- Born: February 8, 1991 (age 35); St. Louis, Missouri, United States
- Genres: Blues rock
- Occupations: Singer, guitarist, songwriter
- Instruments: Vocals, guitar
- Years active: 2000s–present
- Website: Official website

Marquise Knox (born February 8, 1991) is an American blues rock singer, guitarist, and songwriter. Knox has performed alongside B.B. King, Pinetop Perkins and David "Honeyboy" Edwards. He has also performed at dozens of festivals, and toured across the US and Europe.

== Life and career ==
He was born in St. Louis, Missouri, in a musical family whose roots originate in the cotton fields in country near Grenada, Mississippi, at the time of slavery in the United States. His great uncle, Joe, purchased a plastic Mickey Mouse guitar for him when he was three years old, but he did not learn how to play for another few years. When at school he boasted he could play the guitar, and his teacher invited him to perform as part of a black history program, Knox turned back to his family for help. His grandmother, Lilly Mae, showed him the basics on a six string acoustic guitar. Knox progressed and learned his first number, Jimmy Reed's "You Don't Have To Go". Another great uncle, Clifford, who was a talented amateur guitarist, then helped expand Knox's playing expertise, and ensure that he got bought his first proper guitar. Lilly and Clifford became major influences in Knox's blues music upbringing.

By the age of 11, Knox got noticed mimicking older musicians and, within a couple of years, local blues musicians were inviting Knox to sit in on their jam sessions. Through his grandmother and great uncle Clifford, Knox traveled to meet Boo Boo Davis and Big George Brock in Grenada. It transpired that Knox and Brock were distantly related. Further trips there saw Knox able to play alongside David "Honeyboy" Edwards, Pinetop Perkins, Louisiana Red, and Hubert Sumlin. Knox later commented on those times, "I learned from Big George and Henry Townsend not so much music, but more to stay dedicated to the music and not let the older history of the struggle, the blackness, die out". In 2005, Knox performed at the Baby Blues Showcase in St. Louis, which drew much approval from the audience. During a visit to Clarksdale, Mississippi in 2007, Knox met Sam Lay, who organised for Knox to perform at the Blues Masters at the Crossroads, at the Blue Heaven Studios in Salina, Kansas. The reaction was such that Knox was signed to a three album contract with APO Records. This led to him recording his debut album, Man Child (2009), with Michael Burks and his ensemble at Blue Heaven Studios. The release won the Living Blues 'Best Debut Artist Award' and Knox got nominated for a Blues Music Award in the 'Best Debut Artist' category.

In 2010, Knox recorded his self-titled sophomore album. It was undertaken using direct-to-disc recording methodology, when Knox was also making his second appearance at the Blues Masters at the Crossroads. His third album, Here I Am (2011), was again recorded at the Blue Heaven Studios in Salina, Kansas. Here I Am contained nine tracks written by Knox, plus three reinventions of old Muddy Waters numbers. By this stage, Knox was only 20 years old with albums released and opening shows for B.B. King. Although not inactive, Knox did not record another full album's worth of material for another five years. Knox stated, "People kept telling me how young I was. I was raising my own kids. I wanted to figure out how to do this... I didn't stop playing, but I didn't feel the need to record until it finally hit". In 2012, Knox purchased property in the country and moved there with his love, Angie Shepard. It enabled him to connect with his children, concentrate on creating music and keep up his interests in history, politics and the community. He maintained working for Blues in the Schools and served as chair for the non-profit organisation, The Center for Artistic Expression. Knox also worked on getting together a new version of his backing band. In 2014, APO Records issued Marquise Knox (Volume 2), a collection of six tracks recorded in October 2013 via direct-to-disc recording at Blue Heaven Studios. Five of the tracks were Knox compositions, with the other, "Change My Way of Living", written by Lightnin' Hopkins. Lazy Lester played both harmonica and guitar on the recording.

In 2015, Knox journeyed to Argentina and was shocked by the abject poverty he witnessed. Utilising social media, Knox has posted a series of his views on life and music. He has been inspired by the Rev. William Barber and the racially inclusive Moral Mondays Movement. Knox is an adamant and outspoken proponent of maintaining the blues heritage. Remembering advice he obtained from Henry Townsend about keeping control over one's work, Knox formed a record label, Knox Entertainment, in joint partnership with Alonzo Townsend, Henry's son. In 2017, Knox stepped up his performing schedule and played at the National Folk Festival in September in Maryland.

His most recent release, Black and Blue (2017), is a live album that was recorded at the Bowlful of Blues in Newton, Iowa. The collection included tracks such as "Can A Young Man Play the Blues", "One More Reason to Have the Blues" and "Bluesman". In 2019, Knox was asked to join ZZ Top and Cheap Trick on tour and played at 16 shows. At one point Billy Gibbons from ZZ Top had said to Knox, "Marquise, a lot of people think we play the blues. We play around it, at best we might emulate the sound. But you, you're young, can captivate an audience and you're black. You embody the essence of what the blues is all about". In 2020, Knox performed at the Bradenton Blues Festival. Knox performed at the 2026 Chicago Blues Festival, opening at the Jay Pritzker Pavilion on June 5.

== Discography ==
=== Albums ===
Year	Title	Record label
2010	Man Child	APO Records
2010	Marquise Knox	APO Records
2011	Here I Am	APO Records
2014	Marquise Knox (Volume 2)	APO Records
2017	Black and Blue (live album)	Knox Entertainment
