= Notodden Blues Festival =

Music festival in Notodden, Norway

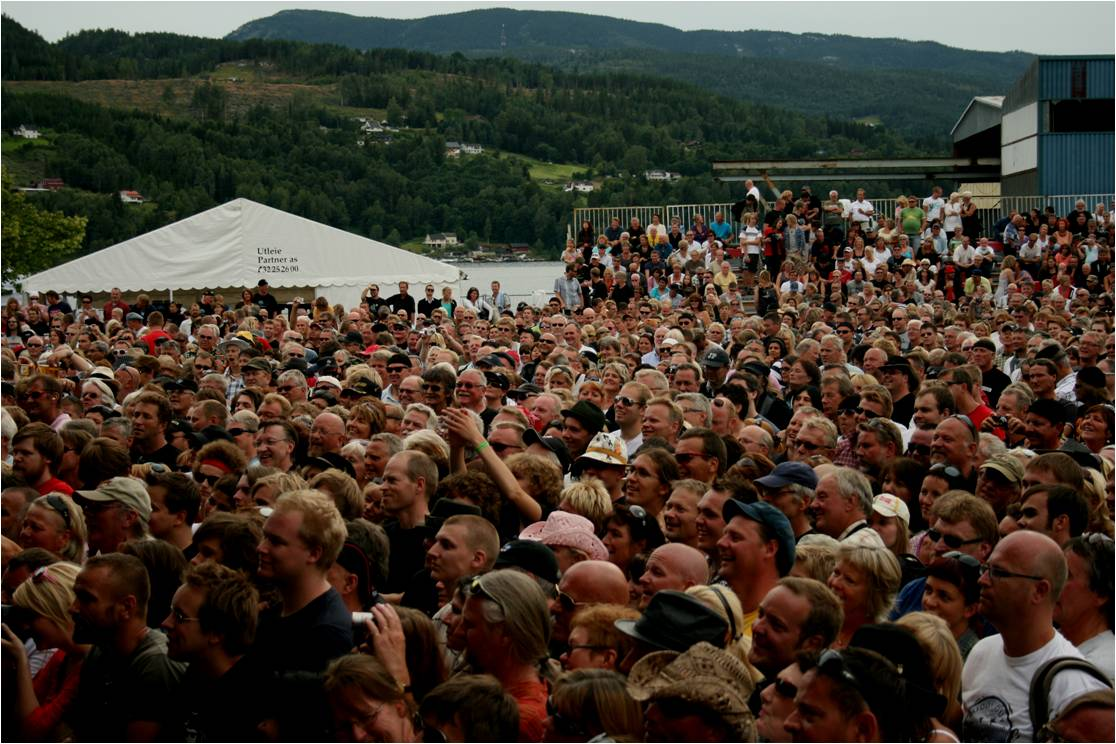
- Audience at the main stage, 2009
- Genre: Blues,
- Locations: Notodden, Norway
- Years active: 1988-present
- Website: Notodden Blues Festival

Notodden Blues Festival (NBF) is one of the largest blues music festivals in Europe and the largest in Scandinavia. The festival is held in Notodden, Norway, usually the first weekend August. It has been running annually since 1988.

The festival does not aim to be the biggest of its type, but to become Europe's "largest blues experience", which is reflected in their emphasis on quality over quantity.

== History ==
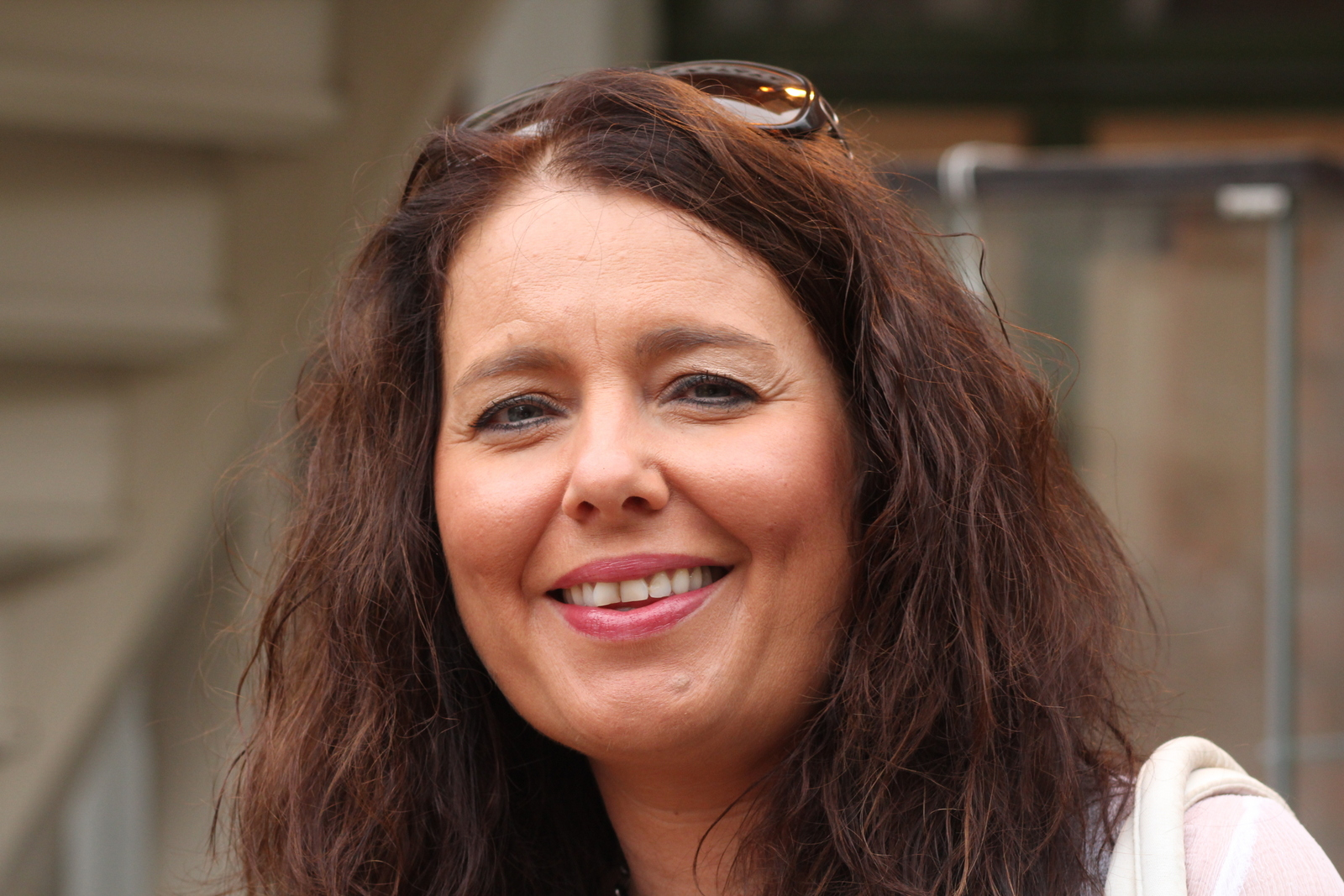
Margit Bakken at Notodden Blues Festival in 2013. With Rita Engedalen, she forms the duo Women in Blues, one of the most established blues ensembles in Scandinavia

In 1988, thirteen local blues enthusiasts gave their personal guarantee to the bank and were granted a cash credit, and the first Notodden Blues Festival took place. The credit from the bank turned out to be unnecessary, and the festival soon became one of Norway's most popular music festivals. Today, the Notodden Blues Festival is the largest "pure" blues festival in Scandinavia, expanding from 2,000 sold tickets (NOK 200,000 gross ticket sales) to 24,500 sold tickets (NOK 12,000,000 gross ticket sales) in 17 years.

== Organization ==
NBF is an ideal organization, where the General Assembly is the highest authority. Every year, the General Assembly elects a new board, consisting of one leader and six board members. The General Assembly provides the guidelines and financial frames wherein the Board can operate.

In 1992, NBF established the Notodden Blues Festival Foundation. The goal of this entity is to secure the financial costs needed to operate the festival. Presently, the "operation capital " controlled by the Foundation is NOK 900,000, which has been accumulated as a result of the economic success of previous festivals.

== Youth seminars ==
Each year, young people between the ages of 14 and 18 are given the opportunity to be a part of the "New Generation of the Blues". Forty youths are chosen to participate in this seminar. Participants, though mostly from Norway, come from as far away as Mississippi, U.S.A. Professional instructors, with backgrounds ranging from studio, touring and television, guide the seminar's students through "one on one", as well as group classes. The seminar includes the disciplines of harmony, playing by ear, instrument/equipment maintenance and the "music business". The seminar is held over six days, starting on the Monday before the festival opening. During the course, each student is given the opportunity to work in the studio and a "studio quality" CD is produced afterwards for each of the participants. The seminar closes on Saturday with a concert performed by the seminar members. This concert is a part of the festival program and is attended by an audience of thousands.

== Other information ==
- For the 2013 festival, both Snoop Dogg and Hugh Laurie asked to play at the festival, but were refused.

== See also ==
- List of blues festivals
- List of folk festivals
