= Blues Masters at the Crossroads =

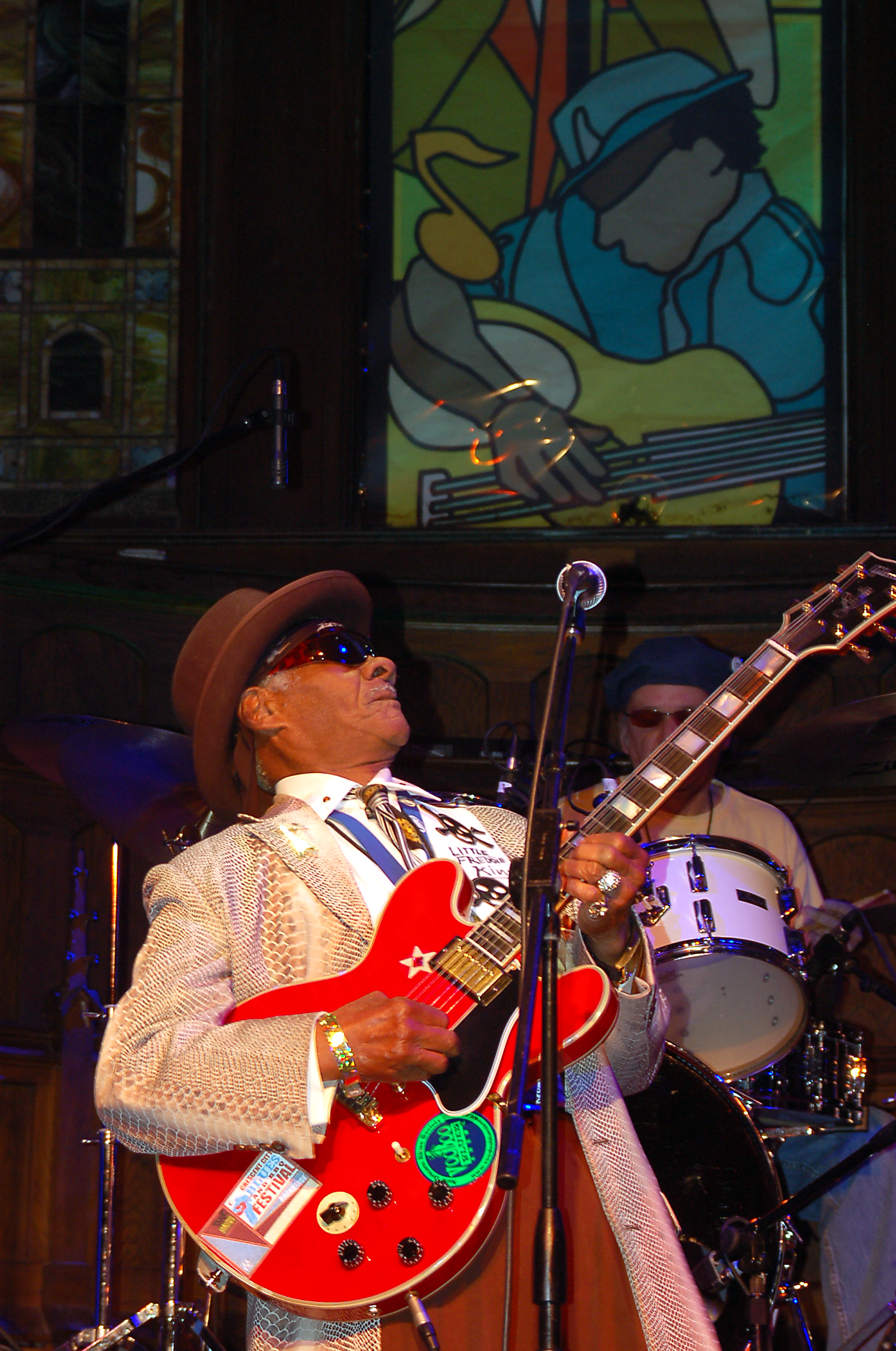
- Little Freddie King performs at the Blues Masters at the Crossroads at Blue Heaven Studios, Salina, Kansas, October 2011

Website
- Blue Heaven Studios.com

Blues Masters at the Crossroads is a two-night blues concert held in October, at the Blue Heaven Studios in Salina, Kansas. It features award-winning blues musicians performing in a Gothic-style church sanctuary, built in 1924, which was bought and converted into a modern recording studio/concert hall by music entrepreneur Chad Kassem.

After the Salina First Christian Church congregation relocated, Kassem, the founder and owner of Acoustic Sounds, Inc., bought the building to provide more storage space for the international LP record and CD mail-order business he started in 1986.

Kassem decided to use the church sanctuary as a recording area due to its superior acoustics. His desire was to bring seasoned blues musicians from throughout the United States to record at Blue Heaven. His goal has been to document and showcase the authentic sounds of their music.

== First concert ==
In August 1997, Jimmy Rogers performed the first concert at Blue Heaven. Beginning in 1998, Blue Heaven began hosting the Blues Masters at the Crossroads, traditionally held the third Friday and Saturday in October.

The two-night Blues Masters at the Crossroads seated 450 audience members each night in the original pew and balcony seats. In such an intimate, theater-style setting, the music emanates beneath a 42-foot vaulted ceiling supported by arching walnut beams. Four oak-trimmed stained glass windows at either side of the sanctuary interior gleam from the stage lights. There were 50 windows of varying sizes incorporated into the church design.

Each night's Blues Masters performances run for about five hours. The concert draws attendees from all over the nation and abroad.

== Roll call of famed musicians ==
Many of the most important names in blues history have performed at the Blues Masters concerts, such as Hubert Sumlin, Lazy Lester, Bobby "Blue" Bland, Pinetop Perkins, Clarence "Gatemouth" Brown, David "Honeyboy" Edwards, Rosco Gordon, Bernard Allison and Snooky Pryor.

Most of the records made at Blue Heaven are for the APO Records label (Analogue Productions Originals), which specializes in all-analog, live-to-two-track recordings. During the Blues Masters concert weekend, artist recording sessions take place at the studio.

== Gallery of Blues Masters musicians ==
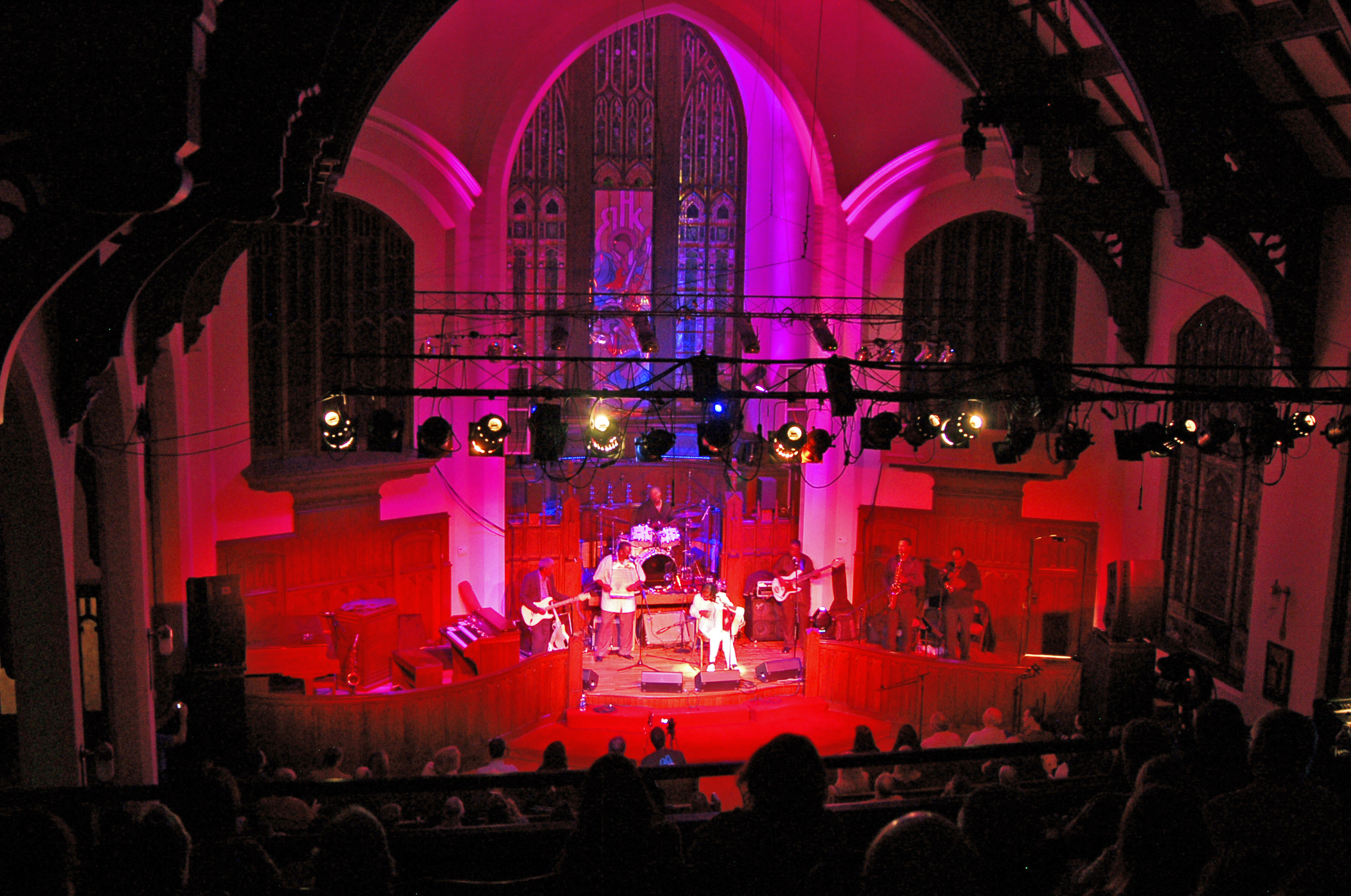
The view from the balcony at the Blues Masters at the Crossroads concert at Blue Heaven Studios

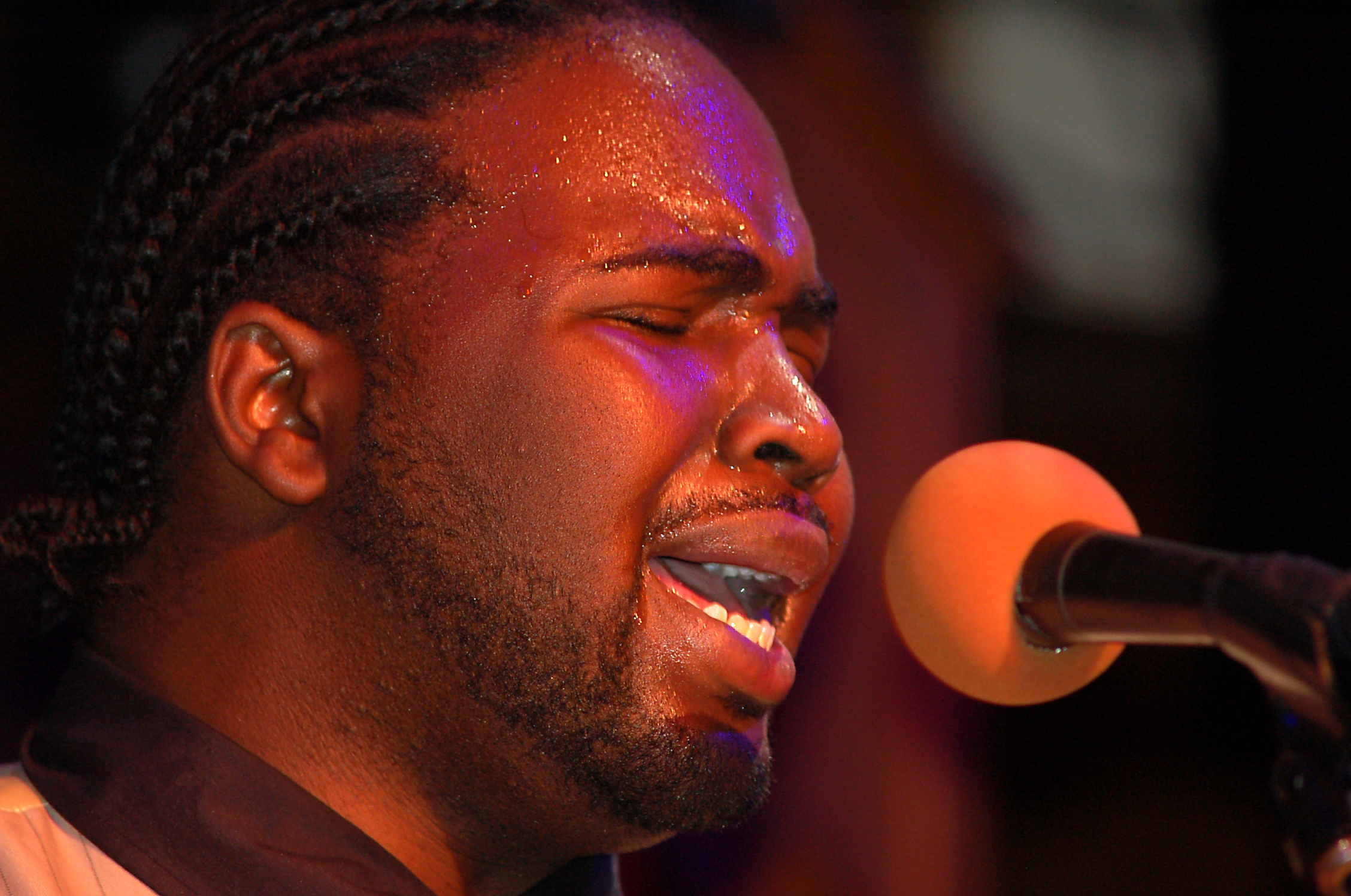
Marquise Knox performing at the Blues Masters at the Crossroads concert in Salina, Kansas in October 2011

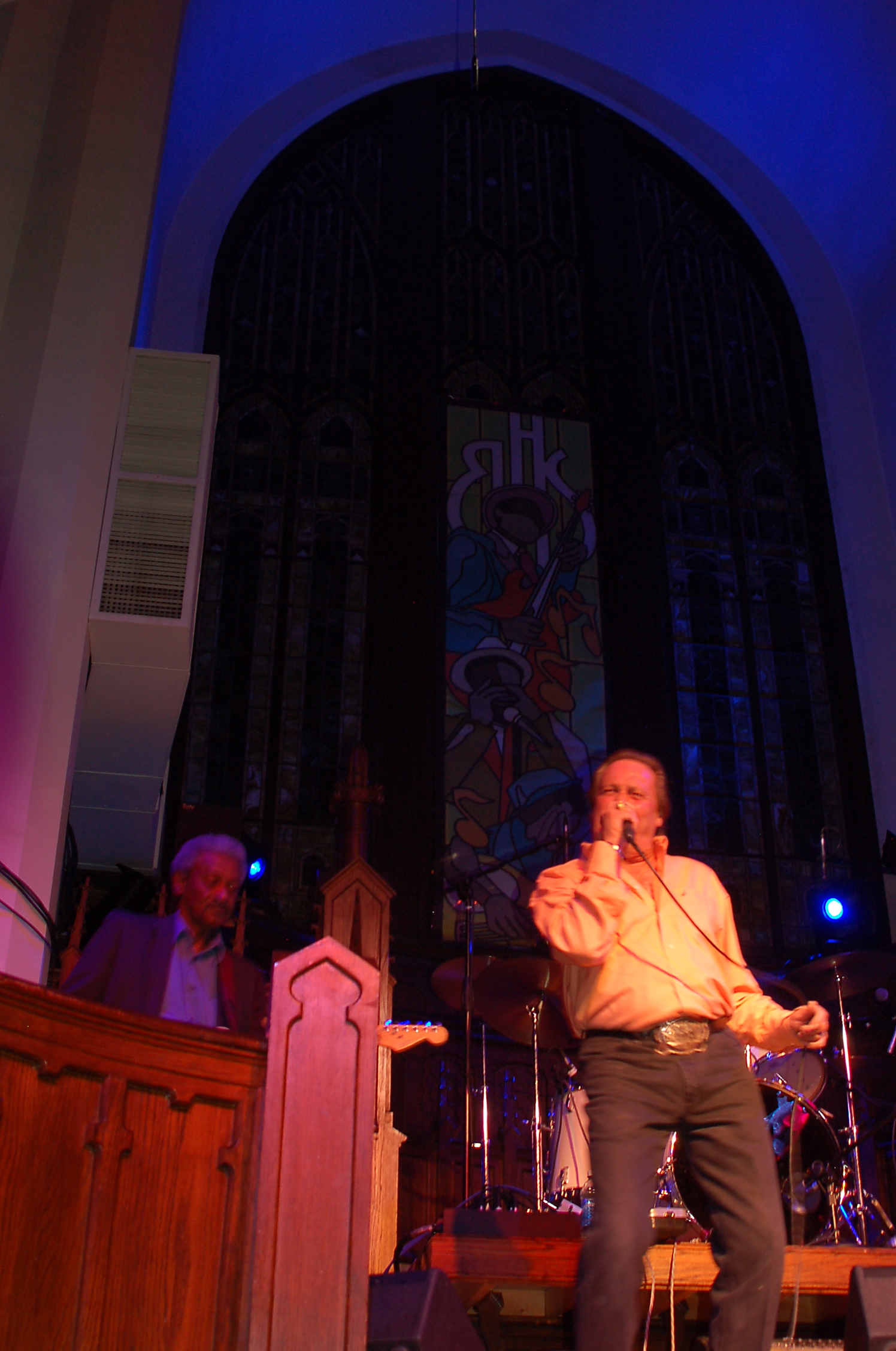
Roy Head performing at the Blues Masters at the Crossroads concert at Blue Heaven Studios in October 2011

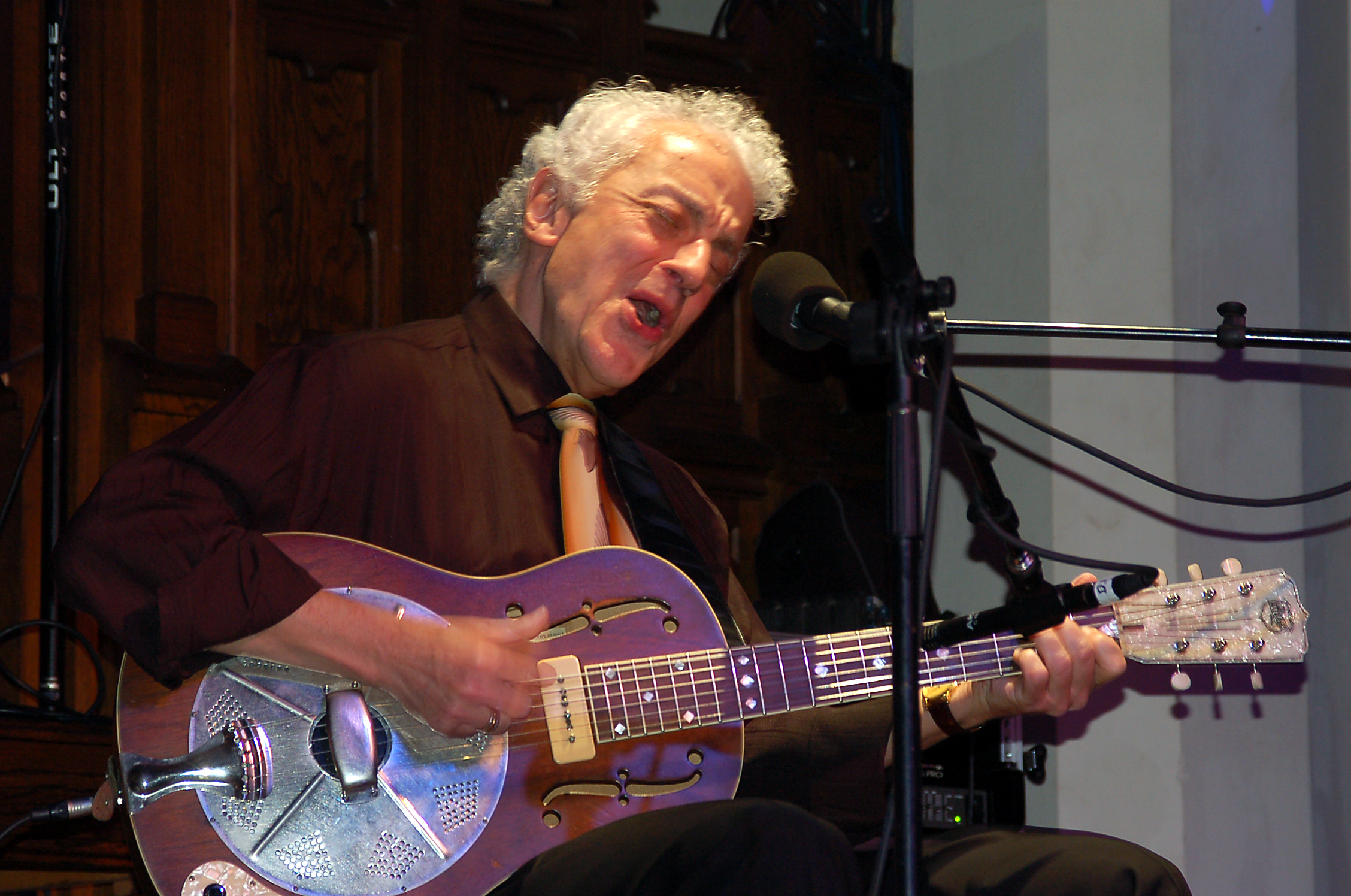
Doug MacLeod entertaining the Blues Masters at the Crossroads audience in October 2011

== See also ==
- Blues Hall of Fame
- List of blues musicians
- List of Chicago blues musicians
- List of Louisiana blues musicians
