= Victor Wainwright =

American songwriter (born 1981)

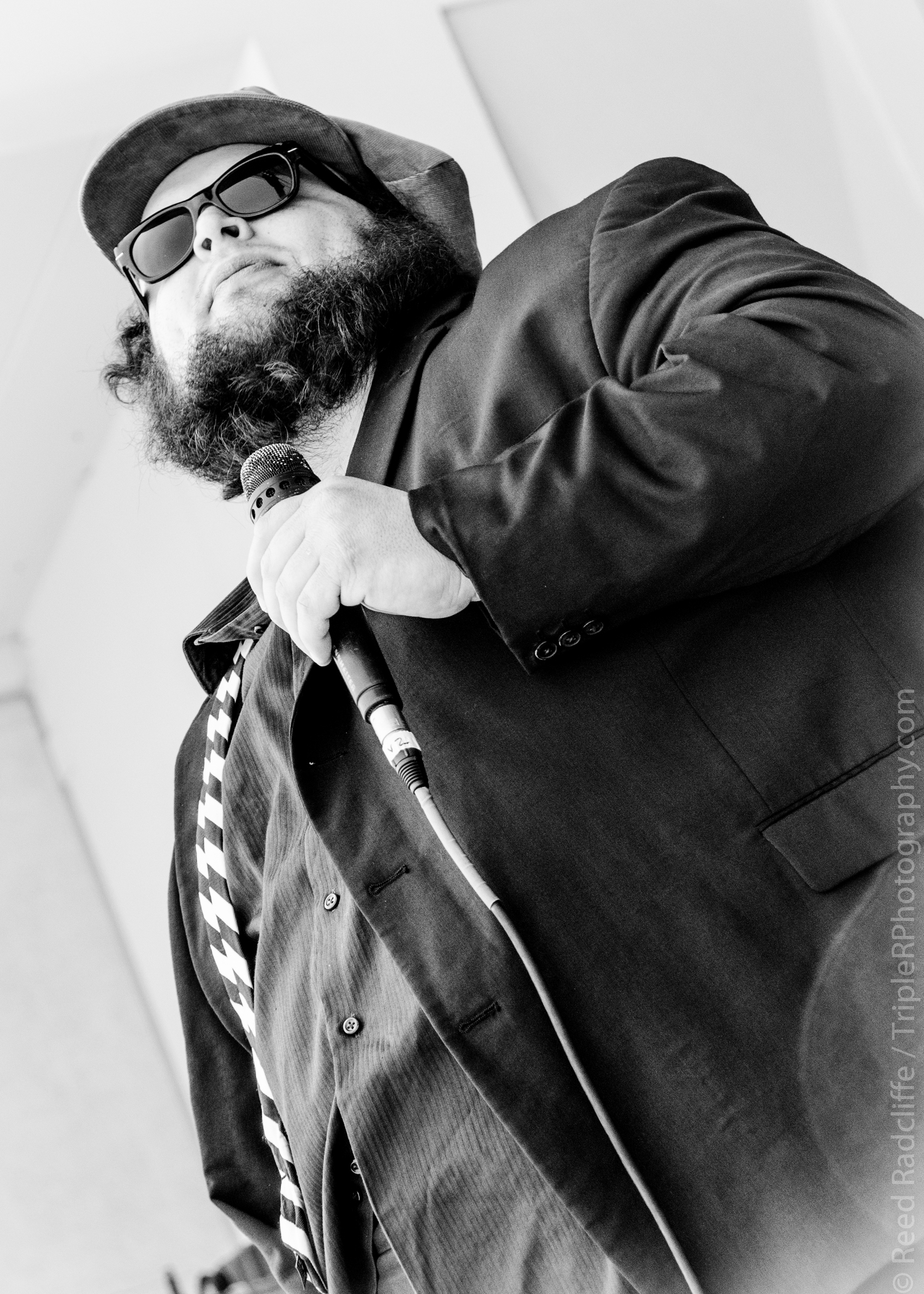

Background information
- Also known as: Piana from Savannah
- Born: Victor Lawton Wainwright, Jr. February 4, 1981 (age 45); Savannah, Georgia, United States
- Genres: Blues, Americana, boogie-woogie
- Occupations: Musician, songwriter, record producer
- Instruments: Piano, hammond b3 organ, vocals
- Years active: 2000s–present
- Labels: WildRoots Records, Blind Pig Records, Ruf Records
- Website: Official website

Victor Lawton Wainwright, Jr. (born February 4, 1981) is an American blues and boogie-woogie singer, songwriter, and pianist. Wainwright's musical style was described by the American Blues Scene magazine in 2013 as "honky-tonk and boogie, with a dose of rolling thunder. Wainwright's playing is simply beautiful madness."

Living Blues magazine noted that "Wainwright serves as an electrifying guide to a good time – spinning tales, telling his listeners how to beat the blues, and meticulously conjuring raw soul and energy out of his acoustic piano."

Wainwright currently tours both nationally and internationally, performing with two bands: Victor Wainwright and the Train, and Southern Hospitality. Wainwright formerly toured as Victor Wainwright & the WildRoots.

== Early life and career ==
Wainwright was born in Savannah, Georgia, United States. Both his father and grandfather were blues musicians, and became Wainwright's early mentors. At the age of 10 at a family gathering, Wainwright played "Für Elise". Wainwright's own ensemble backed Eric Culberson at the Savannah Blues Bar, during the former's high school years.

Wainwright later attended college in Daytona Beach, Florida, and undertook an Air Traffic Management and Psychology degree at Embry–Riddle Aeronautical University, before relocating to Memphis, Tennessee. He then worked as an air traffic controller at Memphis International Airport.

In 2004, Wainwright met Florida native Stephen Dees in Ormond Beach, Florida. The latter was part of Novo Combo in the early 1980s. The meeting led to Dees co-writing and producing Wainwright's debut album, Piana from Savannah (2005). In 2008, Wainwright played alongside the Reverend Billy C. Wirtz on Wirtz's live album Pianist Envy – Group Therapy.

== Victor Wainwright & the WildRoots ==
After the release of Piana from Savannah, Wainwright and Dees joined forces under the name of Victor Wainwright & the WildRoots. Wainwright and Dees shared vocal duties, with the former on keyboards and the latter on bass and guitar with Greg Gumpel as lead guitarist from 2002 through 2009. They were backed by Billy Dean (drums, backup vocal), Nick Black (guitar, backup vocal), Patricia Ann Dees, and Ray Guiser (tenor sax), and Charlie deChant (baritone sax). In September 2009, they released Beale Street to the Bayou on WildRoots Records. The album was praised by critics and placed on the Root Music Report "Top 50 Blues," the Blues Internet Charts, the Tennessee Roots Charts, and Europe's Collectif des Radio Blues Charts.

In October 2010, Wainwright appeared at Dark Season Blues in Norway. In 2011, he performed at the South Florida Boogie Woogie Piano Festival. In June that year, Lit Up! was released, again credited to Victor Wainwright & the WildRoots. The album reached the number one spot on Sirius/XM's B.B. King's Bluesville channel's "Pick To Click," number 2 on the Collectif des Radio Blues Charts, and number 13 on the Living Blues Radio Chart.

Wainwright also performed at Springing the Blues in Jacksonville Beach, Florida, plus at Memphis in May in 2012. The same year he was nominated for the first time for a Blues Music Award. In October 2014, he appeared at the Daytona Blues Festival.

In July 2015, Victor Wainwright & the WildRoots released Boom Town on Blind Pig Records.

== Southern Hospitality ==
Following an impromptu jam session in July 2011 in Florida, Wainwright teamed up with Damon Fowler, J.P. Soars, Chuck Riley, and Chris Peet to form the band that would eventually become Southern Hospitality. Their first gig was supporting Buddy Guy in August the same year at the Heritage Music Blues Fest in Wheeling, West Virginia. Their debut album, Easy Livin' , (2013) was produced by Tab Benoit, and released by Blind Pig Records. It peaked at number 9 on the US Billboard Top Blues Album chart. In 2014, Wainwright won the 'Pinetop Perkins Piano Player of the Year' award at the Blues Music Awards for the second consecutive year.

Wainwright currently lives in Savannah, Georgia, having relocated from Memphis in 2022.

== Victor Wainwright and The Train ==
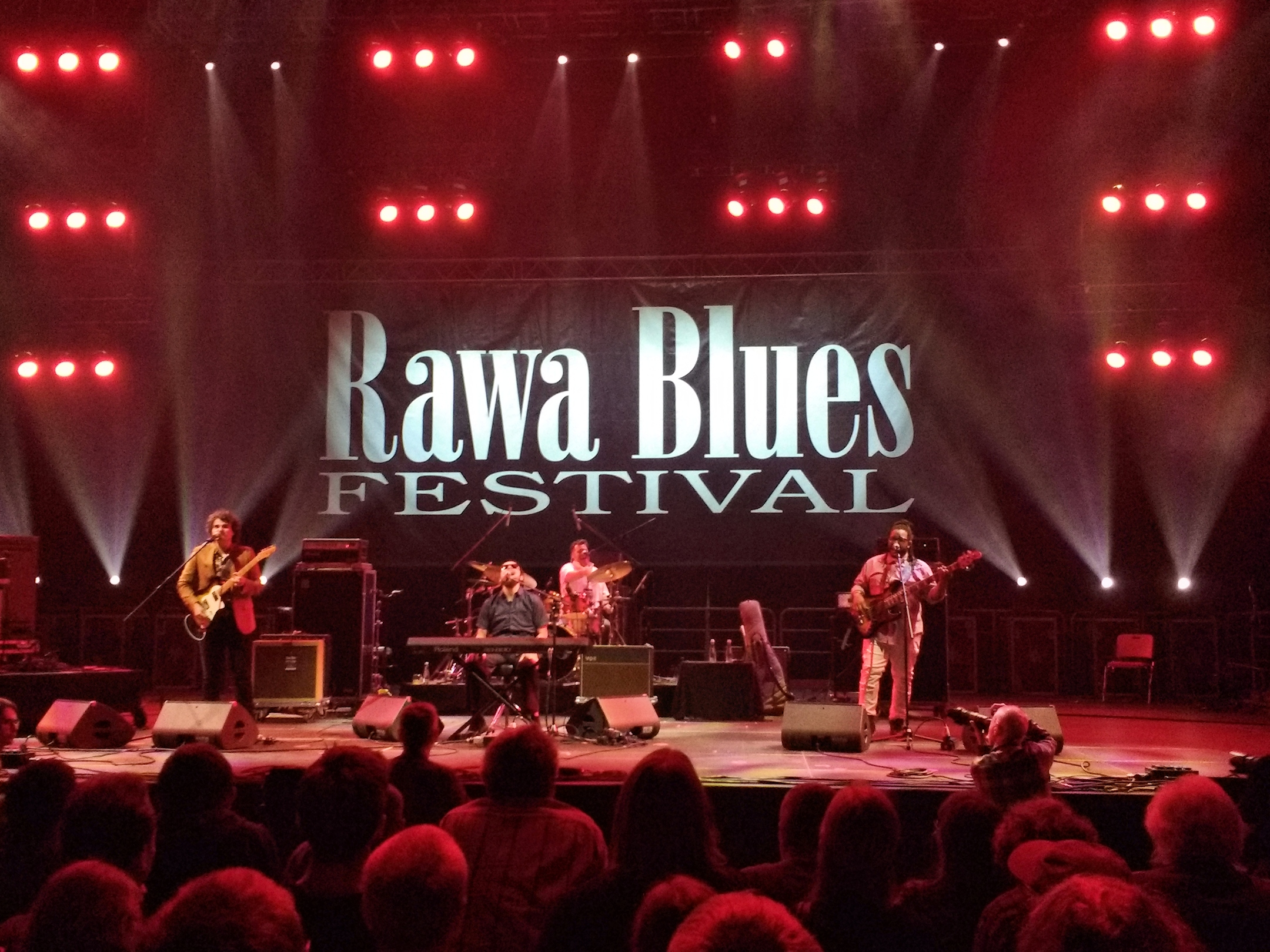
Performing at 2019 Rawa Blues Festival

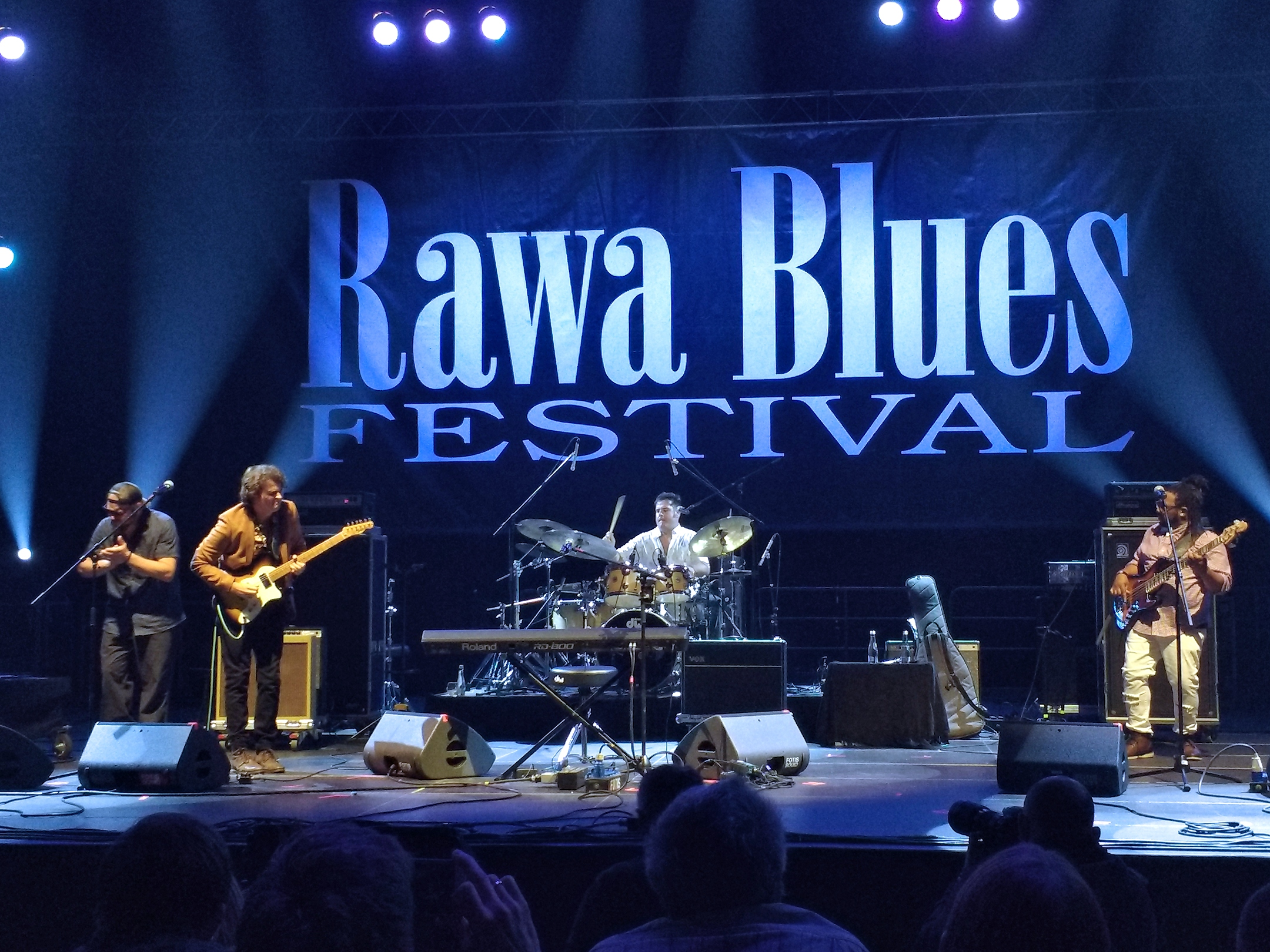
Performing at 2019 Rawa Blues Festival

Wainwright teamed up with friend, engineer, and producer Dave Gross in 2017 to form "The Train," to begin work on what would become the 2018 Grammy nominated self-titled album, Victor Wainwright and The Train. For touring and recording, Wainwright kept longtime bandmates Billy Dean on drums and Terrence Grayson on bass. For guitar, Wainwright added Pat Harrington. He also added the horn players Doug Woolverton and Mark Earley from Roomful of Blues. Wainwright wrote all 12 original songs.

The album, Victor Wainwright and The Train, was recorded at the Ardent Studios in Memphis, Tennessee. The album, co-produced by Wainwright and Gross, was released on March 9, 2018. It went on to garner a Grammy Award nomination for Best Contemporary Blues Album of the Year.

Wainwright currently tours with The Train, consisting of the same recording artists as on the album.

== Honors ==
- 2020: Blues Music Award Winner for Instrumentalist - Piano (Pinetop Perkins Piano Player)
- 2018: Grammy Award Nominee (Best Contemporary Blues Album)
- 2018: No. 1 Most played contemporary blues album of the year
- 2018: No. 2 Most played blues album of the year
- 2018: No. 1 Billboard Blues Albums Chart
- 2018: Blues Music Award Winner for the Pinetop Perkins Piano Player of the Year
- 2017: Blues Music Award Winner for the Pinetop Perkins Piano Player of the Year
- 2016: Blues Music Award Winner for the B.B. King Entertainer of the Year
- 2016: Band of the Year
- 2016: Blues Blast Award Winner for Contemporary Album of the Year
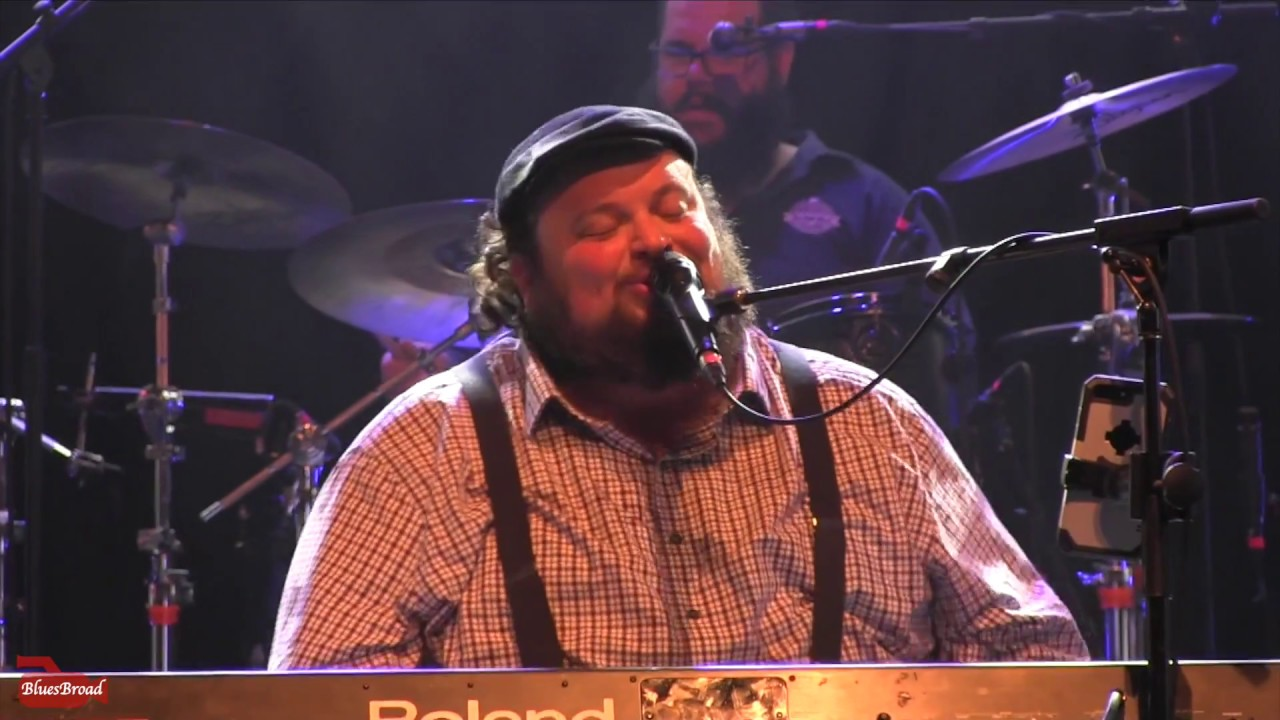

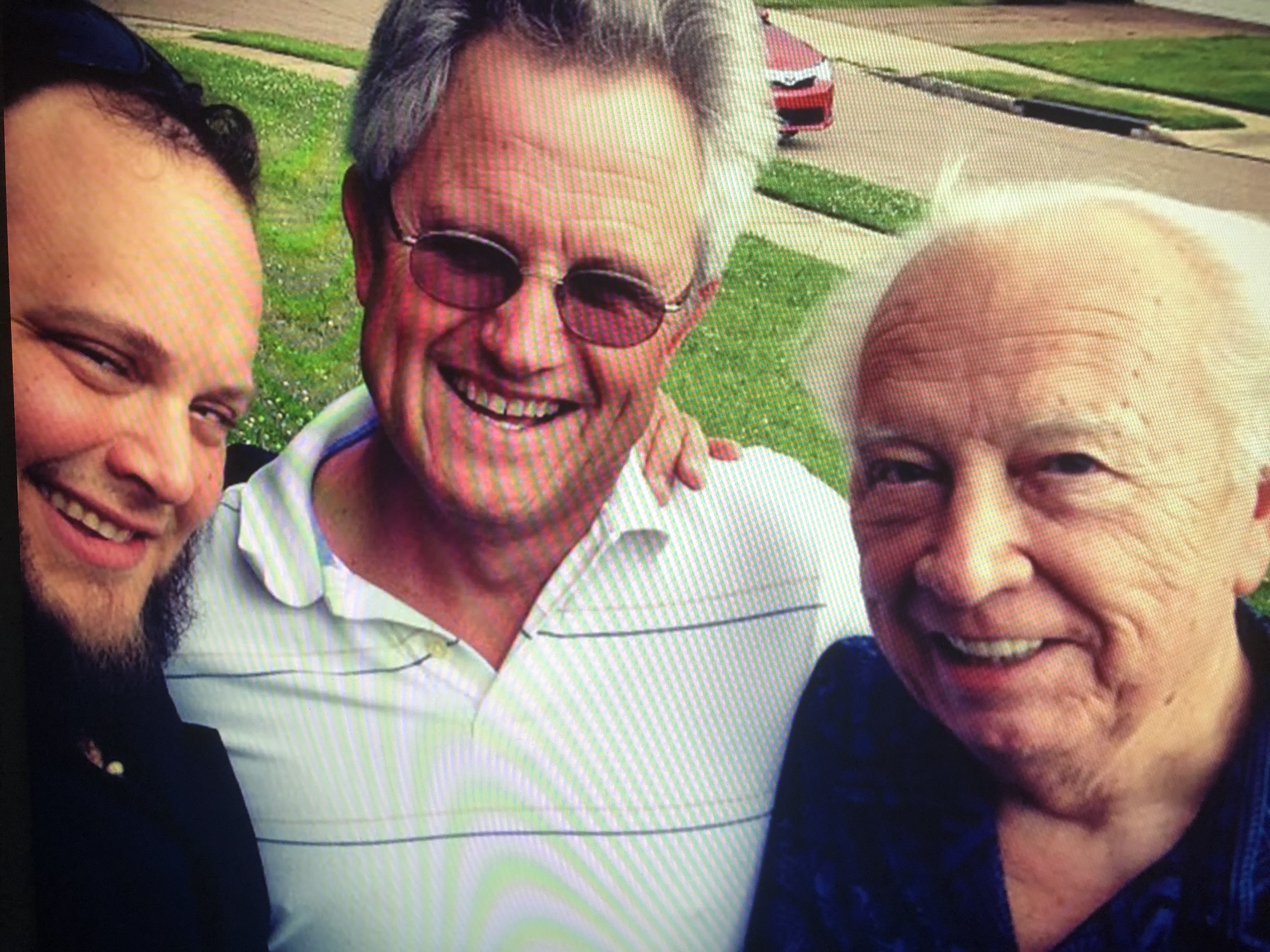
Victor and Mentors (Father & Grandfather)

== Discography ==
Year	Title	Record label	Billed as
2005	Piana from Savannah	WildRoots	Victor Wainwright
2009	Beale Street to the Bayou	WildRoots	Victor Wainwright & the WildRoots
2011	Lit Up!	WildRoots	Victor Wainwright & the WildRoots
2013	Easy Livin'	Blind Pig	Southern Hospitality
2015	Boom Town	Blind Pig	Victor Wainwright & the WildRoots
2018	Victor Wainwright and the Train	Ruf	Victor Wainwright and the Train
2020	Memphis Loud	Ruf	Victor Wainwright and the Train

== See also ==
- List of electric blues musicians
