= List of blues festivals =

Blues festivals are music festivals which focus on blues music. Blues is a genre and musical form that originated in African-American communities in the Southern United States around the end of the 19th century. It has elements of traditional African music, American folk music, spirituals, work songs, field hollers, shouts and chants, and rhymed simple narrative ballads. Blues has since evolved from unaccompanied vocal music and oral traditions of slaves into a wide variety of styles and subgenres, such as country blues, Delta and Piedmont, Chicago, West Coast blues. World War II marked the transition from acoustic to electric blues and the progressive opening of blues music to a wider audience, especially white listeners.

== List of blues festivals ==
=== North America ===
==== Canada ====
Name	City	First year
Harvest Jazz & Blues Festival	Fredericton	1991
Salmon Arm Roots and Blues Festival	Salmon Arm	1991
Ottawa Bluesfest	Ottawa	1994
Bluesfest International Windsor	Windsor	1995
Edmonton's Labatt Blues Festival	Edmonton	1999

==== United States ====
List of blues festivals with name, first year, last year, city, and reference(s)
Name	First year	Last year	city	Ref(s)
Ann Arbor Blues and Jazz Festival	1969	intermittent	Ann Arbor	
Billtown Blues Musical Festival	1990	present	Hughesville	
Blast Furnace Blues Festival	2011	present	Bethlehem	
Blues Masters at the Crossroads	1998	present	Salina	
Boundary Waters Blues Festival	2001	present	Ely	
Bradenton Blues Festival	2012	present	Bradenton	
Briggs Farm Blues Festival	1998	present	Hazleton	
Chicago Blues Festival	1984	present	Chicago	
Cincy Blues Fest	1992	intermittent	Cincinnati	
Crossroads Guitar Festival	1999	intermittent	various	
Dusk Til Dawn Blues Festival	1991	present	Rentiesville	
French Quarter Festival	1984	present	New Orleans	
Heritage Music BluesFest	2000	present	Wheeling	
Highland Jazz & Blues Festival	2003	present	Shreveport	
Memphis In May International Festival	1977	present	Memphis	
King Biscuit Blues Festival	1986	present	Helena	
Long Beach Blues Festival	1980	2009	Long Beach	
Old Town BluesFest	1994	present	Lansing	
Orange County Blues Festival	1993	intermittent	Dana Point	
Pittsburgh Blues Festival	1994	present	Pittsburgh	
Red Bank Jazz & Blues Festival	1987	2016	Red Bank	
San Francisco Blues Festival	1973	2008	San Francisco	
Springing the Blues	1990	present	Jacksonville Beach	
Sunflower River Blues & Gospel Festival	1988	present	Clarksdale	
Telluride Blues & Brews Festival	1994	present	Telluride	
Topanga Canyon Blues Festival	1982	intermittent	Topanga Canyon	
Waterfront Blues Festival	1987	present	Portland	

=== Oceania ===
Name	First year	City
Bendigo Blues and Roots Music Festival	2011	Bendigo, Australia
Blues on Broadbeach Music Festival	2002	Gold Coast, Australia
Blues Train	1993	Queenscliff, Australia
Byron Bay Bluesfest	1990	Byron Bay, Australia
Dingo Creek Jazz and Blues Festival	2002	Gympie, Australia
West Coast Blues & Roots Festival	2004	Fremantle, Australia
Marysville Jazz and Blues Weekend	2014	Marysville, Australia
Agnes Water Blues Fest	2008	Agnes Water, Australia

=== Asia ===
Name	First year	City
Himalayan Blues Festival	2007	Kathmandu, Nepal
Kathmandu Blues n Roots Festival	2016	Kathmandu, Nepal
Mahindra Blues Festival	2011	Mumbai, India

=== Europe ===
Name	First year	City
Orkney Blues Festival	2005	Stromness, Scotland
Bluesroute Helmond	2011	Helmond, Netherlands
Holland International Blues Festival	2016	Grolloo, Netherlands
National Jazz and Blues Festival	1961	London, England
Focsani Blues Festival	2016	Focșani, Romania
Blues Peer (Belgium Rythmn 'n' Blues)	1986	Peer, Belgium
American Folk Blues Festival	1962	Europe
Bath Festival of Blues 1969	1969	Bath, England
Bath Festival of Blues and Progressive Music	1970	Bath, England
Puistoblues	1978	Järvenpää, Finland
Rawa Blues Festival	1981	Katowice, Poland
Aglientu Summer Blues Festival	2008	Alghero, Italy
Liri Blues Festival	1988	Isola del Liri, Italy
Pistoia Blues Festival	1980	Pistoia, Italy
Kwadendamme Bluesfestival	1993	Kwadendamme, Netherlands
Blues to Bop Festival	1988	Lugano, Switzerland
Notodden Blues Festival	1988	Notodden, Norway
Harvest Time Blues	1990	Monaghan, Ireland
August Blues Festival	1993	Haapsalu, Estonia
Upton Blues Festival	2001	Upton-on-Severn, England
City of Derry Jazz and Big Band Festival	2002	Derry, Northern Ireland
Dark Season Blues	2003	Longyearbyen, Norway
Callander Jazz and Blues Festival	2006	Callander, Scotland
Stafford Blues Festival	2015	Stafford, England
Blues Nights	1993	Varniai, Lithuania
Blues-Bike Festival Suzdal	2008	Suzdal, Russia
Baltic Blues / Bluesfest	1989	Eutin, Germany
Brunner Blues Festival / Bluesfest	2007	Brunn am Gebirge, Austria
Santa Maria Blues	2004	Santa Maria Island, Portugal
Suwalki Blues Festival / Bluesfest	2007	Poland
Moulin Blues Ospel	1986	Ospel, Netherlands
