= Bendigo Blues and Roots Music Festival =

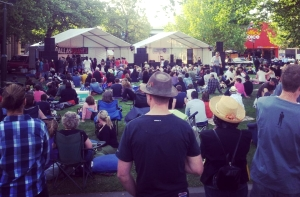
- Genre: Blues and roots
- Dates: November
- Locations: Bendigo, Victoria, Australia
- Years active: 2011 – 2019, 2022
- Website: bendigobluesandroots.com.au

The Bendigo Blues and Roots Music Festival (otherwise known as Bendigo Blues & Roots or BBRMF) was a four-day music festival held in November each year in the central Victorian city of Bendigo. The not-for-profit event was first held in 2011 and features performances and workshops at various venues and locations throughout Bendigo.

== History ==
The first year of the festival (2011) was held over three days in November (25–27) and included over 58 different artists, with a free concert held in Rosalind Park headlining the festival.

In 2012 the free festival headline concert changed location moving to the Bendigo Civic Gardens, and this time the festival included the addition of "The Blues Tram", featuring performances aboard some of the vintage trams which are still operating in Bendigo. The festival was held over four days in November (8 - 11) and this time included over 90 acts throughout 20 venues.

2013 saw the festival headline concert return to Rosalind Park. The festival was held over four days in November (7–10) with over 100 acts performing throughout 22 venues.

In 2014 the festival ran over 4 days from 6–9 November, with over 116 artists performing throughout Bendigo and surrounds. This year the festival held the main event at the Bendigo Civic Gardens. The inaugural 'Lazenby Young Blues Guitarist Award' was also held in 2014. This award was set up to honour Phil Lazenby, who died in 2013.

In 2015 the festival staged over 400 performances in 48 venues from more than 180 acts over the 4-day program from 5–8 November. This included a return to Rosalind Park for the all-day family-friendly concert. It also included headline concerts at the Capital and Ulumbarra Theatres, as well as shows of all shapes and sizes at all kinds of venues in and around the city.

In 2016, approximately 15,000 people attended the festival.

2017 saw the festival run over four days, officially launching at the Gold Dust Lounge on Thursday. Thirty-two venues hosted live music for the festival, as well as the main stages in Rosalind Park on Saturday. 2017 also saw the acts hosted in the Golden Dragon Museum for the first time since the festival began.

The 2018 festival hosted over 150 acts in 50 venues, and included both free and ticketed events. For the first time, the 2018 festival also held 'Blues Boot Camp' - a two day workshop aimed at developing theoretical and practical music industry skills for young musicians.

The festival was not held in 2020 or 2021 due to the COVID-19 pandemic in Victoria. The final event took place in 2022 from 3-6 November, featuring 122 artists including Goanna and Colin Hay of Men at Work.

== See also ==
- List of blues festivals
