= Harvest Time Blues =

Annual music festival, Monaghan, Ireland

Coordinates: 54.2479°N 6.9708°W

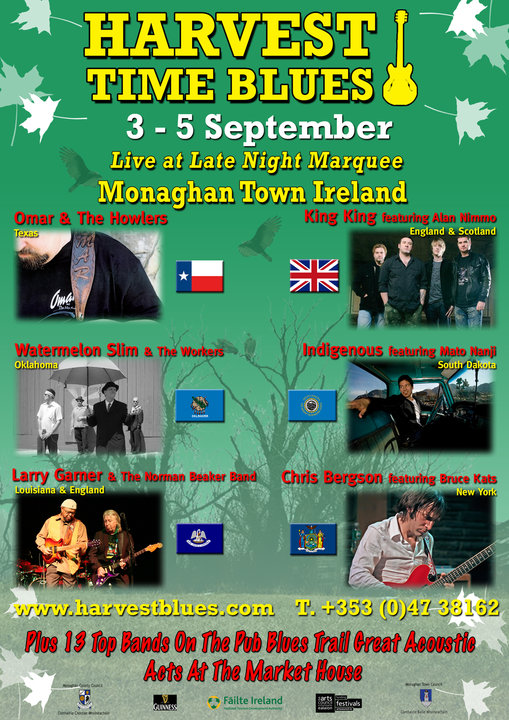
- Flyer for 2010 event
- Genre: Blues, Funk, Soul, Rock, Reggae, Jazz, Reggae.
- Dates: First weekend of September (3/4 days)
- Locations: Monaghan, Ireland
- Years active: 1990–2001, 2007–present
- Founders: Somhairle MacConghail, Seamus McKenna
- Website: harvestblues.ie

Harvest Time Blues (also referred to as the Monaghan Rhythm and Blues Festival) is an annual music festival held in Monaghan town, in Ireland. Since its launch in 1990, it has been described as "one of Ireland's leading live music festivals". Performers appearing at the festival have included Van Morrison, Peter Green of Fleetwood Mac, and ex-The Rolling Stones guitarist Mick Taylor.

== Location ==
The festival takes place in Monaghan town, with venues located across the town, and a main stage typically located in a large marquee in the New Road/Glen Road car park. Pubs across the town play host to smaller gigs in what is collectively known as the "Blues Trail".

== History ==
The first Harvest Time Blues festival took place in 1990, to "promote and enrich the cultural life of Monaghan, the North-East and Ireland". The festival was an initiative between Somhairle MacConghail, the Arts Officer for County Monaghan, and local publican and blues enthusiast Seamus McKenna. The festival has taken place every September since, except between the years of 2001 and 2006, and was originally sponsored by Heineken. Performers who have appeared at the festival over the years have included Van Morrison in 1998, Peter Green of Fleetwood Mac, and ex-The Rolling Stones guitarist Mick Taylor.

Tommy Castro at Harvest Time Blues 2007

== See also ==
- List of blues festivals
- List of folk festivals
