= Quality Record Pressings =

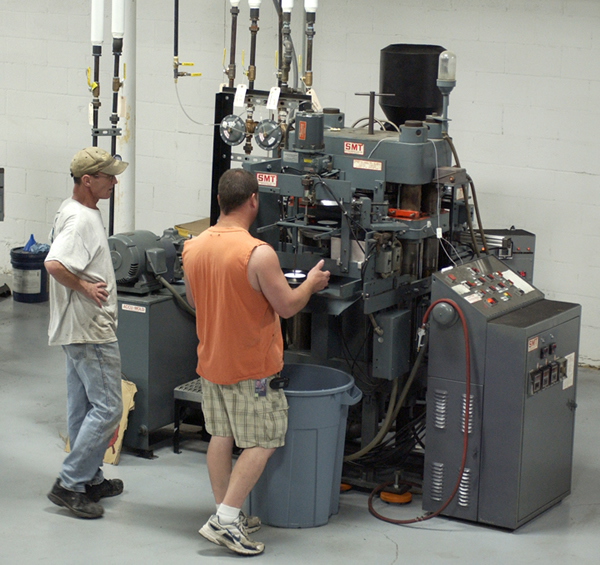
- Workers operate an SMT record press at Quality Record Pressings

Website
- QualityRecordPressings.com

Quality Record Pressings is a vinyl record pressing plant launched by music entrepreneur Chad Kassem in Salina, Kansas, United States in 2011. QRP sought to improve premier audiophile pressings, introducing innovations never before tried in the record pressing industry.

== Company history ==
Quality Record Pressings was born out of parent company Acoustic Sounds, Inc. Kassem started Acoustic Sounds in 1986 as a mail-order business specializing in the sale of audiophile vinyl LPs, SACDs, DVD-Audios, high-quality CDs and high-end stereo equipment. Acoustic Sounds sister business, Analogue Productions, reissues choice jazz, blues, classical and folk recordings. Analogue Productions now has more than 450 titles in print. By launching his own vinyl pressing plant, Kassem sought to end increasing delays in getting his records pressed, both reissues as well as those from authentic and legendary living blues artists recording on Kassem's APO (Analogue Productions Originals) record label. Kassem also sought to raise the quality of LP production by investing in innovative pressing technology.

As of 2026, Quality Record Pressings has a strict minimum of 1,000 LPs or LP sets per order.

== Innovations, technology improve recordings ==
Located in a 20,000 square-foot former refrigerated warehouse in Salina, QRP operates three different kinds of record presses that include Toolex Alpha (made in Sweden), SMT (Southern Machine & Tool Corp. of Nashville, Tennessee) and Finebilt (of Los Angeles). The Toolex Alpha and SMT presses are automated, while the Finebilt presses are manual, but all feature important add-ons.

== Greater operator control over pressings ==
Microprocessors were added to cycle each press based on temperature rather than the more inaccurate cycling by time, enabling greater operator control over heat and other variables that can create inconsistencies from record to record. Operators inspect each record as it comes off the press. Other technology employed helps mitigate variations in other factors that can compromise a record's quality, such as pressure and vibration. Uneven contact between the surface of the press die, to which is attached the stamper (the mold that creates a vinyl record), results in temperature variations. These variations introduce variations in the width and depth of individual grooves on the record. Quality Record Pressings uses a vacuum system to ensure uniform die and stamper contact. As a result, the listener's turntable needle tracks more smoothly and provides the listener with a more faithful reproduction of the music. QRP also uses an innovative double steam valve system that reduces die temperature cycle time as well as a more finely tuned level of temperature control of the heating and cooling process. Both reduce inconsistencies from record to record in the manufacturing process.

And just as ambient temperature, humidity and variations in steam and water pressure affect the quality of a vinyl record, so do the minute environmental vibrations from nearby equipment. Unwanted harmonic vibration transmitted to the die during the pressing process causes distortion of the record's grooves and other noise as well as other unwelcome changes in the physical structure of the grooves on a record. QRP uses custom-designed press isolation pads to mitigate the effect of these vibrations. As part of its record pressing operation, QRP also operates a plating department, setting it apart from other record pressing plants that do not have that capability. The plating department headed by Gary Salstrom is where Lacquer master discs are given metal coatings to make the metal stamper that molds the records from heated vinyl. In 2010 the acquisition of Classic Records, of Los Angeles, California, by Acoustic Sounds, was announced by Kassem and Classic Records Mike Hobson. Acoustic Sounds acquisition of Classic Records included the “Quiex SV-P” vinyl formulation/process, “Clarity Vinyl”, the unique 200-gram “flat profile” tooling and all other aspects of Classic's proprietary vinyl pressing technology.

== First title released ==
The first title pressed at Quality Record Pressings was Cat Stevens's Tea for the Tillerman from 1970. All of the Analogue Productions reissues and the APO Records titles are now pressed at QRP and the pressing plant also handles the jobs of several other record labels, both large and small.

== See also ==
- Acoustic Sounds, Inc.
- Analogue Productions
- Blue Heaven Studios
