= Pittsburgh Blues Festival =

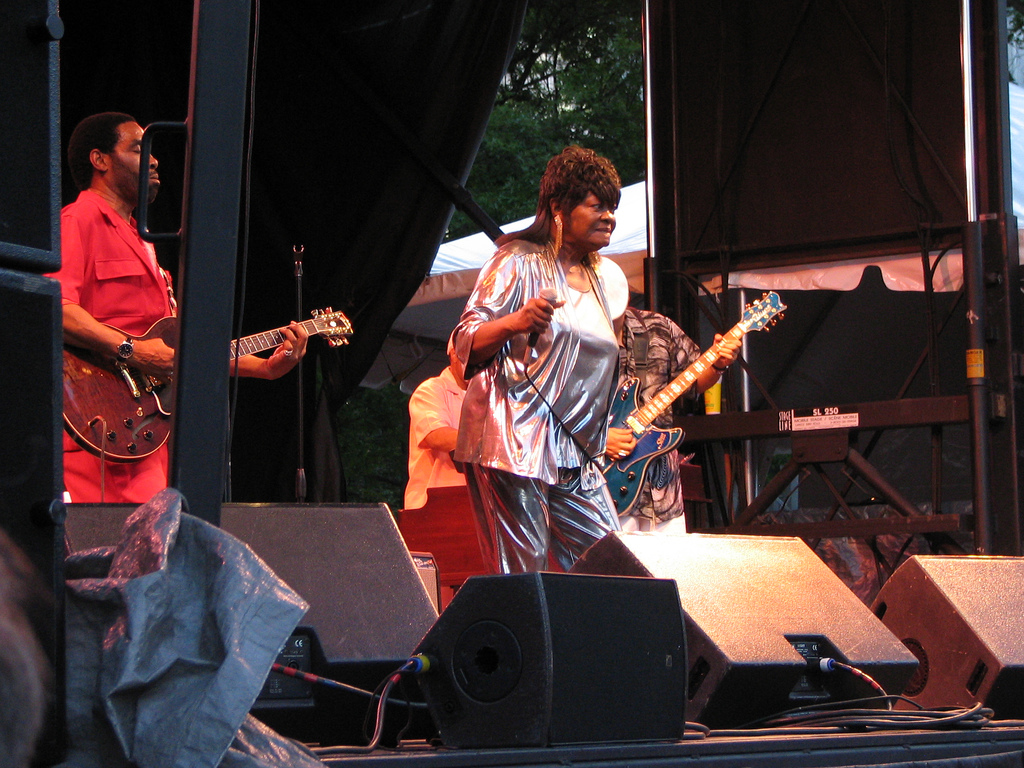
- Frequency: Annual
- Locations: Pittsburgh, Pennsylvania, United States
- Inaugurated: 1994

The Pittsburgh Blues and Roots Festival is an American music festival that features local and nationally renowned blues musicians in performance in Pittsburgh, Pennsylvania. It is one of the region's "marquee annual concerts."

== History ==
The inaugural event took place at the Riverplex at Sandcastle Waterpark, and since then has been held at Hartwood Acres Park and at the Iron City Brewing Company factory.

Proceeds from the event benefit charity. The Greater Pittsburgh Community Food Bank had been the recipient of the proceeds until 2017 when Band Together Pittsburgh, a local nonprofit that teaches those on the autism spectrum all about playing, writing, recording and even DJing music. It offers programs throughout the year to help those on the spectrum learn the magic of music. It is now held yearly at The Shriners Pavilion in Cheswick, Pennsylvania and is held over two days in the summer.

There was no festival in 2020.

== Previous acts ==
Many musicians have previously performed at the Pittsburgh Blues Festival: Koko Taylor, Taj Mahal, John Mayall, Gatemouth Brown, Devon Allman, Bernard Allison, Guy Davis, and Robert Cray.

2018 The Jeff Fetterman Band Spectrum The Nied's Hotel Band The Gathering Field John Nemeth Tina Daniels Band The Bail Jumpers Patrick Lah & Shailen Abram Tas Cru Jimbo & The Soupbones Bernard Allison Walter Trout EK Band The Rhythm Aces Ron Yarosz & The Vehicle	2017 Matt Barranti Bill Toms and Hard Rain Featuring The Soulville Horns Anthony Gomes Tinsley Ellis Spectrum Adler/Barath Blues Band Miss Freddye Shot O' Soul theCAUSE Women of The Blues Jim Donovan and Sun King Warriors Kenny Neal Jill West and Blues Attack Stevee Wellons

== Kidzone ==
The Kidzone tent at the Pittsburgh Blues Festival accommodates a wide range of children's activities including story-telling, face painting, musical presentations, and crafts. The kidzone also provides healthy snacks.

== See also ==
- List of blues festivals
- List of folk festivals
