= Jerzy George Kossek =

Polish educator, blues theorist and blues promoter

Jerzy "George" Kossek is a Polish nationally and internationally recognized educator, blues theorist, and blues promoter. He has actively promoted blues music in Poland over the last three decades.

== Educator ==
Known to many as "Doctor Blues," Kossek has been teaching African-American history, culture, literature, and blues music since 1979 when he started his first ‘American Club’ in collaboration with the American Consulate General in Kraków, Poland under communism. His courses expose students to blues research, blues journalism and literature, blues performances, blues organizations, blues charities, and others. In his courses, Kossek educates about the role that the blues played in African-American history. He also focuses on blues theory, ways to preserve the blues, and how to implement the blues in teaching methods. He actively promotes creative writing of blues texts and poetry at Blues Poetic Café at the international Rawa Blues Festival which is held annually in Katowice, Poland.

Kossek founded the European Academic Blues Center at the Academy of Business in Dąbrowa Górnicza, Poland, which researches all aspects of the blues as a cultural phenomenon, and the Ethnic Studies Center in Katowice, Poland. Kossek has been involved in organizing educational conferences and seminars focusing on the blues. He hosts a weekly, blues-oriented radio show every Sunday at 96.2 FM on Radio Silesia.

== Awards and recognition ==
In 2015, he was awarded a Fulbright Senior Research grant to research the blues at six major U.S. universities.

In 2015, he received the Keeping the Blues Alive award for blues education by the Blues Foundation. This organization presents the KBA Awards to individuals and organizations that have made significant contributions to blues music. The KBA ceremony is held in conjunction with the International Blues Challenge in Memphis, Tennessee.
