= Eric Culberson =

American singer-songwriter

Eric Culberson is an American blues guitarist and singer-songwriter from Savannah, Georgia, United States. Victor Wainwright's own ensemble backed Culberson at the Savannah Blues Bar, during the former's high school years.

Culberson's music has been reviewed by Living Blues, Real Blues Magazine, and Blues Revue magazines. His first album, Blues is my Religion, (Kingsnake Records, 1995) reached No. 24 on the American Billboard blues chart. Other albums include No Rules to the Game (Kingsnake Records, 1998), Live at the Bamboo Room (Independent Release, 2005), and In The Outside, (Independent Release, 2010), which was produced by Kevin Rose of Elevated Basement Studios and mastered by Terry Manning.
