= Blues Train =

Musical act in Victoria, Australia

- Genre: Blues
- Dates: October – May
- Location: Queenscliff
- Years active: 1993 – present
- Organised by: Grounded Entertainment
- Website: Official website

The Blues Train was founded in 1994 and is operated in partnership with the Bellarine Railway as an homage to the history of the blues music. The Blues Train travels along 16 km (9.9 mi) of railway between the towns of Queenscliff and Drysdale with an intermediate stop at Suma Park, on the Bellarine Peninsula and the passengers rotate in order to see all performers.

== History ==
The Blues Train began operating in 1994 with one or two services a year and now operates approximately forty times a year on Saturday evenings between October and May, with occasional Fridays in December.

The Blues Train has hosted a range of blues acts including Chris Wilson (Australian musician), Jimi Hocking, Claude Hay, Ezra Lee (musician) and others. The train was nominated for a 2020 Music Victoria Award.

== See also ==
- List of blues festivals
