= Telluride Blues & Brews Festival =

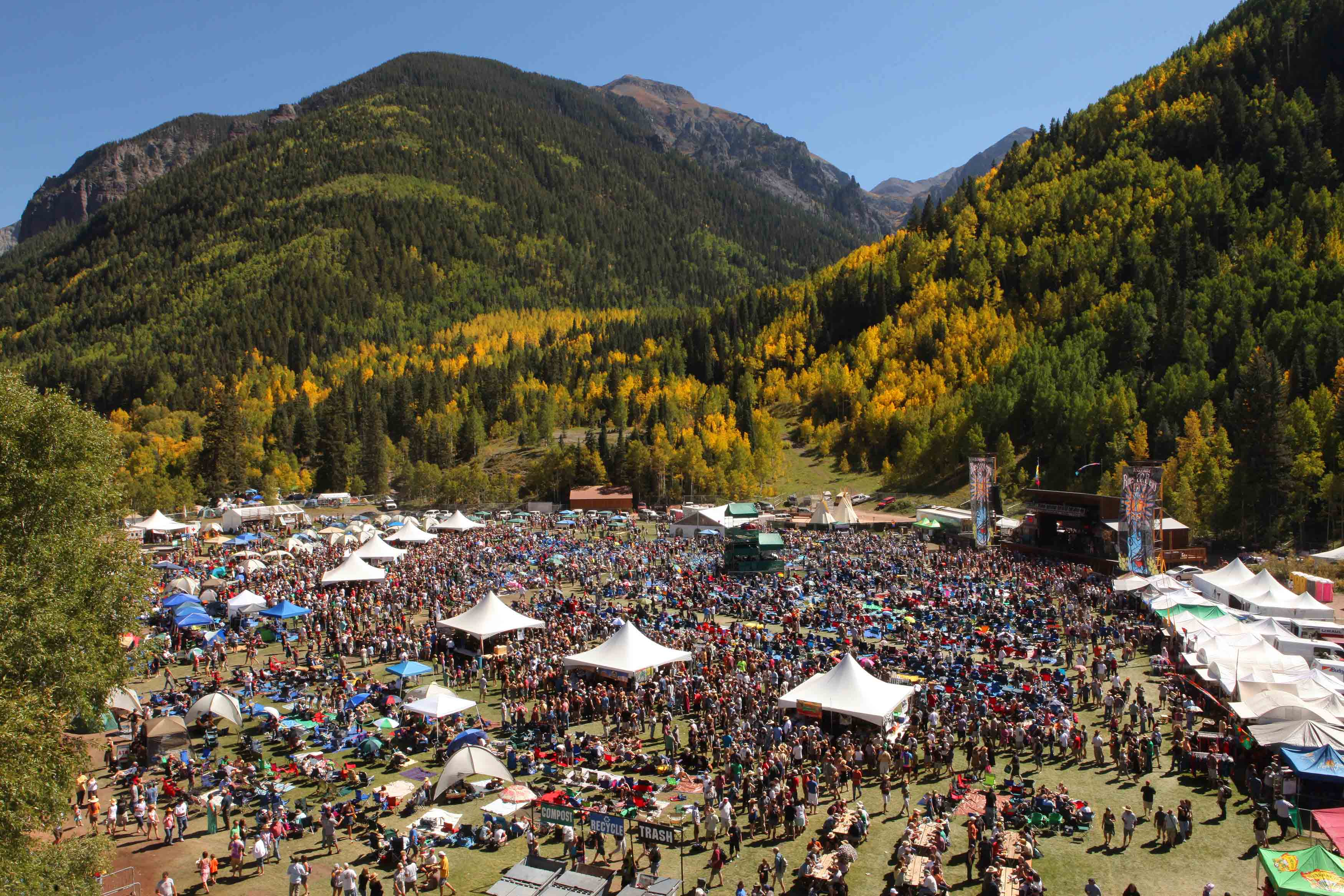
- Telluride Blues & Brews Festival 2014
- Genre: Blues,
- Dates: 17–19 September 2021
- Location: Town of Telluride, Colorado
- Years active: 1994–2019, 2021–
- Founders: SBG Productions, Inc.
- Website: www.tellurideblues.com

Telluride Blues & Brews Festival is a three-day music festival held in September in Telluride, Colorado. Blues & Brews is a three-day celebration of music and microbrews held in Telluride Town Park, an outdoor music venue with 13,000 foot mountains as a backdrop. The festival offers a mix of live blues, funk, rock, jam band, gospel and soul performances, a beer Grand Tasting with 56 microbreweries, food and craft vendors, children's activities, and late night shows. The festival also includes a blues competition where the winner plays a slot on the main .

The festival features on-site camping and glamour camping ("glamping")

This festival went on hiatus in 2020, but has taken place annually since starting back up in 2021.

== See also ==
- List of blues festivals
- List of folk festivals
