= Himalayan Blues Festival =

- Genre: Blues, Rock
- Dates: September–November
- Locations: Kathmandu, Nepal
- Years active: 2007–2015

Himalayan Blues Festival was an annual international music festival founded in Kathmandu, Nepal, in 2007. It later also expanded to other cities Indian cities, including Delhi, Mumbai, Chennai and Bengaluru. The ninth and last edition took place in 2015.

The festival featured blues artists from Nepal and other countries, and combined live performances with workshops and collaborative sessions.

== History ==
The festival was originally founded by Rockmandu.com and the Blues Room, represented by organiser duo Samik Kharel and Avash Bhatta, who sought to introduce blues music to a wider audience in Nepal. The first three editions took place in venues across Kathmandu, including the Patan Museum and the Garden of Dreams. The programmes included concerts, open jam sessions and workshops, and featured artists from multiple countries.

The fifth edition, in November 2011, was held in Kathmandu as well as Mumbai, Bengaluru and Delhi, Performers included Australian guitarist Jimi Hocking, American duo Izzy and Chris, Swedish musician Bert Deivert, and Nepali bands Mukti and the Revival, Monkey Temple, and RockSitar.

The 2014 edition was held in Kathmandu. International participants included musicians from Australia, Austria, Argentina, Denmark, Mexico, Russia, Sweden, the United Kingdom and the United States. Nepali artists included Mukti and Revival, the Midnight Riders, Monkey Temple, and Robin and the New Revolution.

The final edition, in 2015, was held partially in Chennai, India, and paid tribute to the victims of the 2015 Nepal earthquake.

== See also ==
- List of blues festivals
- List of folk festivals
