= Upton Blues Festival =

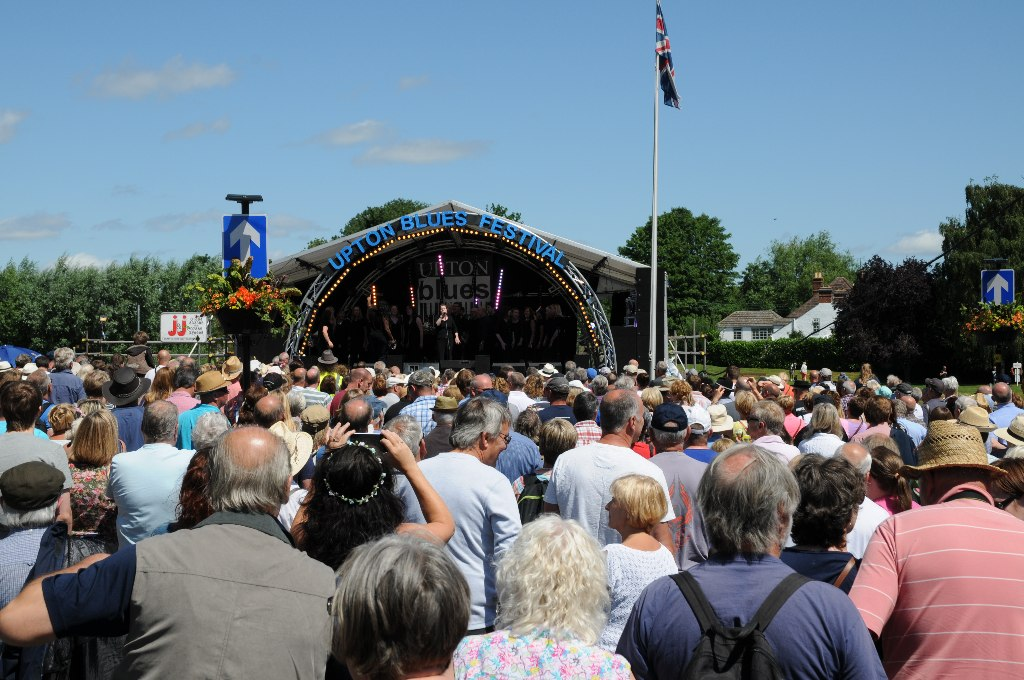
- Genre: Blues
- Dates: Third weekend in July (3 days)
- Locations: Upton-on-Severn, Worcestershire, England
- Years active: 2001 – present

The Upton Blues Festival is a music festival held annually in the United Kingdom at Upton-on-Severn, Worcestershire, usually staged on the third weekend of July. Formed in 2001, seven local people each put £10 each to create a basic fund. The first festival in 2002 had 19 acts over the weekend in a few of the towns pubs, it is now one of the largest festivals in Worcestershire and the middle River Severn area.

The festival was heavily affected by the 2007 United Kingdom floods. Despite the weather and funding issues the festival continued with a new committee in 2008 and has grown rapidly since then. It now has three main stages and nine pub venues with over 135 gigs throughout the weekend in 2017.

Nominated in the UK Festivals Awards in 2012 this volunteer-run festival was up against the biggest professional festivals in the country.

Winners of Visit Worcestershire Award "Best Festival & Events Award" in 2014

Winners of Blues in Britain "Best Blues Festival in the UK" award 2015 & 2016

In 2016 & 2017 LR Blues (Provided by Longside Radio) broadcast live on 87.7Mhz FM and on the internet for the duration of the festival. This was the first Blues festival to have its own FM radio station on the UK.

The Upton Blues Festival became a registered charity in 2012, charity Number 1148230. It is fully self funding (without major sponsorship or public funding) independent festival generating over £800,000 revenue for the town and surrounding area.

"In the last three years, Upton Blues Festival has invested over £8000 in programmes for Schools and academies in the local area. Alongside regular songwriting workshops, instrumental Master classes and lectures as part of the Festival, UBF has been Running outreach and education workshops for schools since 2009. Initially run as a one-day "Bluesical Youth" workshop and performance on festival Friday in partnership with West Midlands Arts Colleges and The SSAT, The Festival now, with the support of RSA Academies, offers term-time, bespoke workshop and musical support packages (including music therapy groups, instrument donation scheme and Blues master classes) to schools across Worcestershire and the Midlands. As of 2017 the two main stages are officially "opened" on Festival Friday with a student performance on each."

The festival also paid £40,000.00 to have the towns run down tennis courts turned into a Multi Use Play Area in 2015/16, for the use of all townsfolk and visitors.

== See also ==
- List of blues festivals
- List of folk festivals
