= Highland Jazz & Blues Festival =

Annual music festival in Louisiana

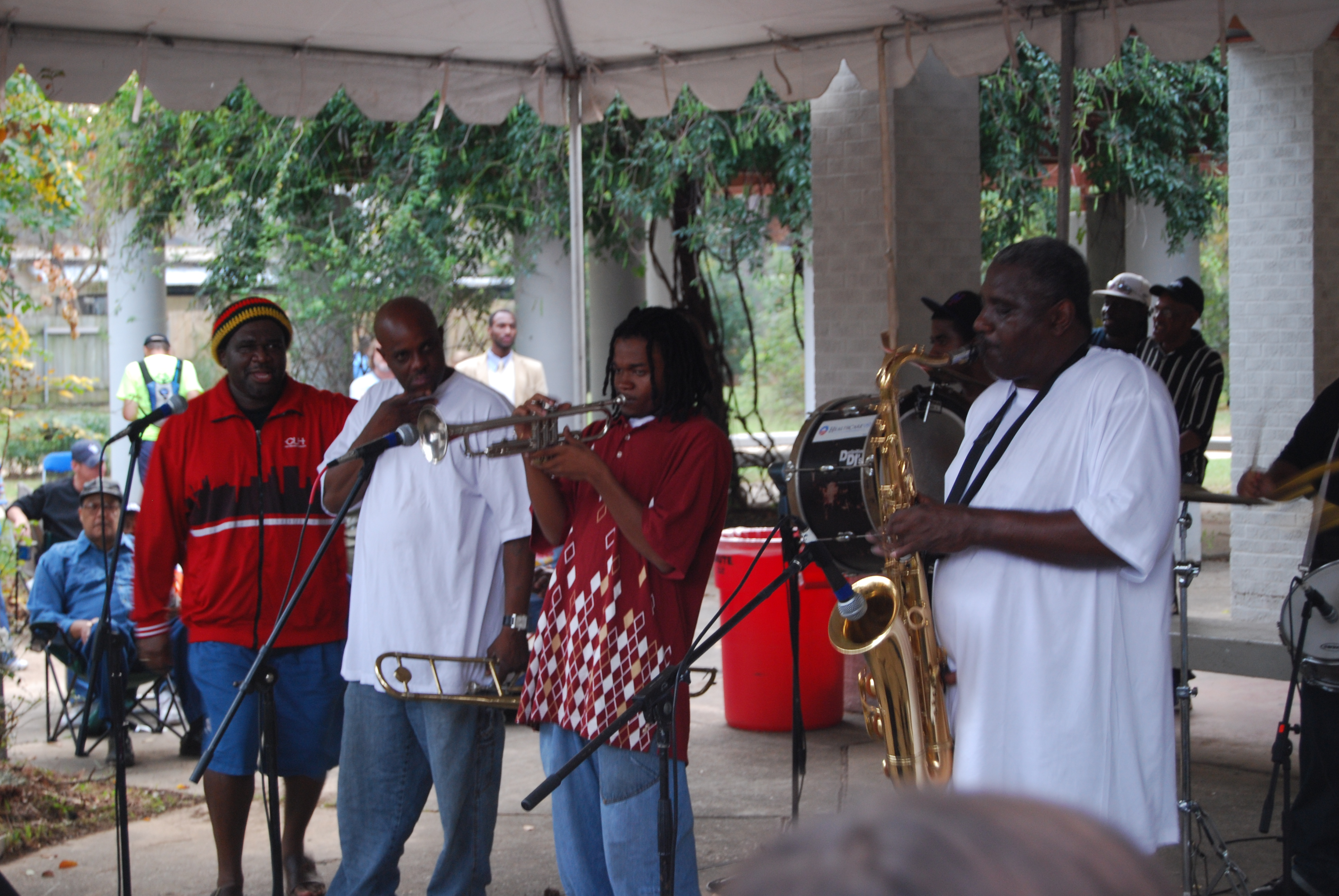
- Genre: Blues, jazz
- Dates: third Saturday of September
- Locations: Shreveport, Louisiana, United States
- Years active: 2003-2019, 2021-
- Founders: Robert "Bob" Marak Amy Loe Kenneth Koonce
- Website: www.highlandjazzandblues.org

The Highland Jazz & Blues Festival is an annual music and arts event that takes place in Shreveport, Louisiana, United States. It is held on the third Saturday of September at Columbia Park, a city park located in the historic Highland neighborhood. The festival was created by the Highland Area Partnership, Inc. (HAP) in 2003. The festival is a nonprofit event meant to contribute to the ongoing growth of the neighborhood in which its held. There is no admission charge. Proceeds are reinvested into the festival and into various community projects.

The festival draws from Shreveport's pool of musical talent for the bulk of the 10 bands that play during the event. However, the festival added a headliner spot in 2008, that draws from outside the area for talent. The headliner is usually an example of a particular "school" of jazz or blues music. Past performers have included the Grammy Award winner Henry Gray, whilst the 2009 festival featured the Rebirth Brass Band.

The festival added craft and food vendors with the 2005 event. The number of participants has grown from three to a maximum of fifty-six for the 2010 event.

There was no festival in 2020.

== See also ==
- List of blues festivals
- List of jazz festivals
