= Callander Jazz and Blues Festival =

- Genre: Jazz, blues
- Locations: Callander, Scotland
- Coordinates: 56.24403°N 4.21446°W
- Years active: 2006–present
- Website: callanderjazz.com

The Callander Jazz and Blues Festival is a music festival held in the town of Callander in Loch Lomond and the Trossachs National Park, Scotland. It was first held in 2006. The event in 2019 featured 54 gigs at 14 venues, performing live jazz and blues over 3 days.

== Lineups ==
=== 2009: 2–4 October ===
Invited musicians for the 2009 Festival include:

Jazz

Fat Sams Band, Aidrian Drovers Slide Rule Winstons's Pennine Jazz, The Tim Barella Big Band, Brass Impact, The George Penman Jazzmen, Havana Swing, Swing Guitars, Kit Carey's Jazz Band, The Trossachs Big Band, The Roger Cull Quartet, Jazzmain, The Maria Speight Quintet, Jan Douglas and Primetime, Moodswing, The Scott Madden Trio, The Jess Abrams Quartet, The Bobby Wishart Quintet McCallum/Harrison Duo, The Thistle Saxophone Quartet , The Frank Curran Quartet, McLaren High School Swing Band, South Ayrshire Schools Jazz Band, The Bert Craig Trio, Quatro Mc Jazz, The Rosie Blue Duo

Blues

The Lyndon Anderson Band, Side Winder, The Revolutionaires, The Red Stripe Band, The Blues Devils, The Blues Juniors, The Bob Hall Show, B' and The Honey Boys, Mojo Rising, Main Street Blues, The Cherry Lee Mewis Band, The Sourmash Blues Band, Safe House Blues, The Rosie Blue Blues Band, Gavin Mooney, Al Hughes, Minnie and The Victors

=== 2008: 3–5 October ===
The 2008 event featured nearly 50 bands and solo performers.

Big Band

Trossachs Big Band ( composed of local musicians and member of That Swing Sensation ), McLaren High School Swing Band, Brass Impact, Andy Mears Jazz Orchestra, The Tim Barella Big Band

Trad

George Penman Jazzmen, Kit Carey's Jazzband, Winston's Pennine Jazz

Jazz: Duos to Sextets

Alison Burns Quartet, Birdland, Bobby Wishart Quintet, Claire Daly Trio, Dekal, Havana Swing, Jan Douglas & Prime Time, Liquid Jazz, Liz MacEwan & Jack Finlay Trio, Lorna Reid Quartet, Maria Speight Quintet, McCallum/Harrison Duo, Moodswing, Nick Gould's Jazzmain, Roger Cull Quartet, The Clyde Rhythm Group, The Frank Curran Quartet, The Jess Abrams Quartet, The Thistle Saxophone Quartet

Blues

Al Hughes, Blue Dubh, Bluebelly, Blues Devils, Blues House, Daniel Smith & T-Bone Taylor, Deep Blue, Gavin Mooney, Georgia Crawl, Guy Tortora Band, Kent Duchaine, Lights Out by Nine, Main Street Blues, Papa Mojo, The Blues Collective, The Fabulous Corvettes, The Hitmen, Wing and a Prayer

== See also ==
- List of blues festivals
- List of jazz festivals
