= Blue Heaven Studios =

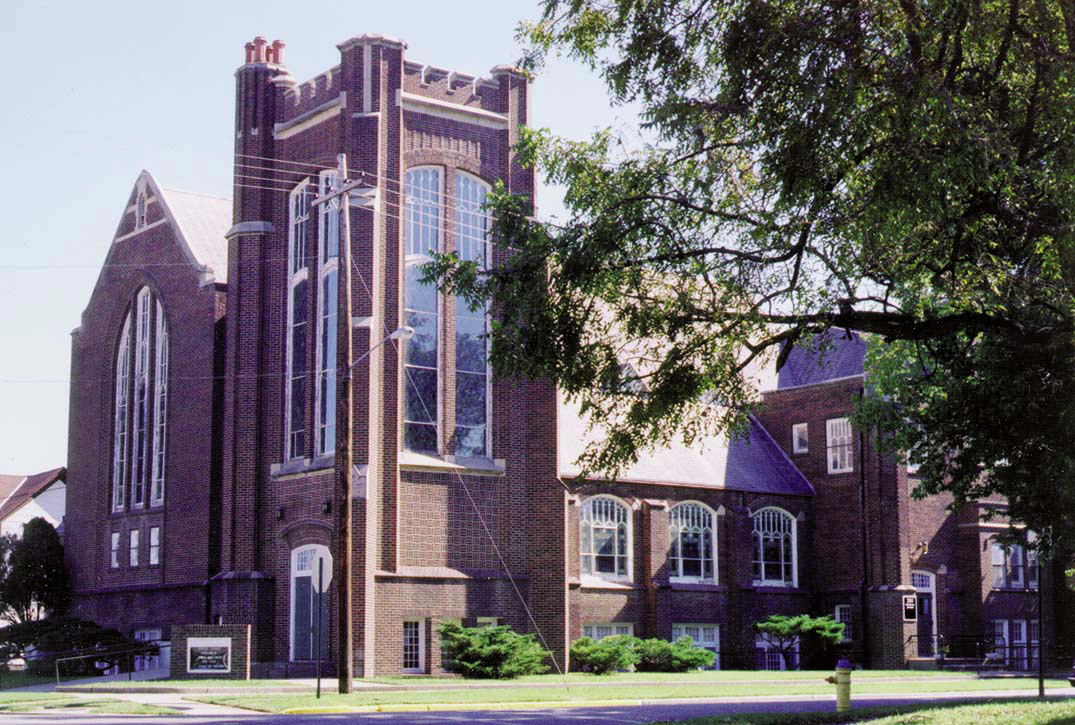
- The outside of Blue Heaven Studios in Salina, Kansas

Website
- Blue Heaven Studios.com

Blue Heaven Studios is a recording studio located in a gothic-style church in Salina, Kansas. The studio is a division of Acoustic Sounds, Inc., founded by music entrepreneur Chad Kassem, and is the home of a yearly blues music festival — Blues Masters at the Crossroads.

== Church becomes recording studio ==
Blue Heaven's shell is the former Salina First Christian Church, which Kassem purchased in 1996 after the church congregation relocated. The church was originally to be used solely to provide more storage space for Acoustic Sounds, Inc., an international LP record and CD mail-order business founded by Kassem in 1986.

The church was designed by Salina architect Charles W. Shaver and was built starting in 1924 and completed in 1927. The church features 50 stained glass windows, walnut beams, a 42-foot-high vaulted ceiling and oak woodwork trim and pews.

Recognizing the structure's inherent superior acoustics, Kassem decided to use the church sanctuary as a recording area and build at the rear of the space a modern engineering control room with direct to disc recording and LP lathe cutting capabilities.

== Repairs and interior design ==
Work on the building ranged from repairing leaks in the roof to replacing faulty wiring to heater maintenance. Nearly two tons of dry plaster was used in making wall repairs.

Design expert Neil Muncy, specializing in the design of broadcast and recording facilities, was hired to oversee the recording studio project. The studio was wired with premium audio cable from Belden and Canare with gold-plated connectors. New electrical service, including panels, breakers and surge suppression was installed, as well as a new transformer to provide the studio with its own power source. The sanctuary is wired for 200 amps of stage lighting, eight camera lines, press feed and video distribution throughout the building.

Blue Heaven's main studio recording area measures 77 feet long and 52 feet wide. For comparison, Studio One at Abbey Road Studios, the London recording studio where The Beatles recorded almost all of their albums and singles between 1962 and 1970, measures 94 feet long and 55 feet wide and is the world's largest purpose-built recording studio.

In 2003, Warner Bros. and recording artist Kenny Wayne Shepherd chose Blue Heaven to serve as the final venue in the documentary and CD project 10 Days Out: Blues from the Backroads, which chronicled Shepherd's 10-day journey to meet many of the blues artists he considered most influentia.l The project concluded with a concert at Blue Heaven that featured the surviving members of both the Muddy Waters Band and Howlin’ Wolf Band. 10 Days Out:... was nominated for a Grammy Award in the category of Best Traditional Blues Album (Vocal or Instrumental).

== Studio is home for APO new releases ==
All APO (Analogue Productions Originals) record titles have been recorded at Blue Heaven Studios since 1998. The studio is also available for anyone to book session time.

The discovery of a listener demand for unsigned artists’ music led to Kassem's creation of Analogue Productions Originals in 1993. In addition to new releases, APO reissues out-of-print blues, classical and jazz classics, primarily on 180-gram heavyweight vinyl.

Kassem's efforts and the activities at Blue Heaven have been featured in numerous national news publications and programs including CBS News Sunday Morning, CNN’s Across America and National Public Radio's All Things Considered.

== Concert performances ==
In August 1997, Jimmy Rogers performed the first concert at Blue Heaven. Beginning in 1998, Blue Heaven began hosting an annual two-night concert series called the Blues Masters at the Crossroads. The concert, traditionally held the third Friday and Saturday in October, draws fans from around the world to see a lineup of classic Blues performers. Blues Masters performers to date have included Bobby Bland, Clarence "Gatemouth" Brown, Pinetop Perkins, David Honeyboy Edwards, Hubert Sumlin, Buckwheat Zydeco and Nappy Brown.

Artists who have recorded at Blue Heaven, aside from APO Records or as part of the Blues Masters at the Crossroads, include Frank Black, John P. Hammond, Waterdeep and Kenny Wayne Shepherd.

== See also ==
- Quality Record Pressings
