= Acoustic Sounds, Inc. =

American music retailer

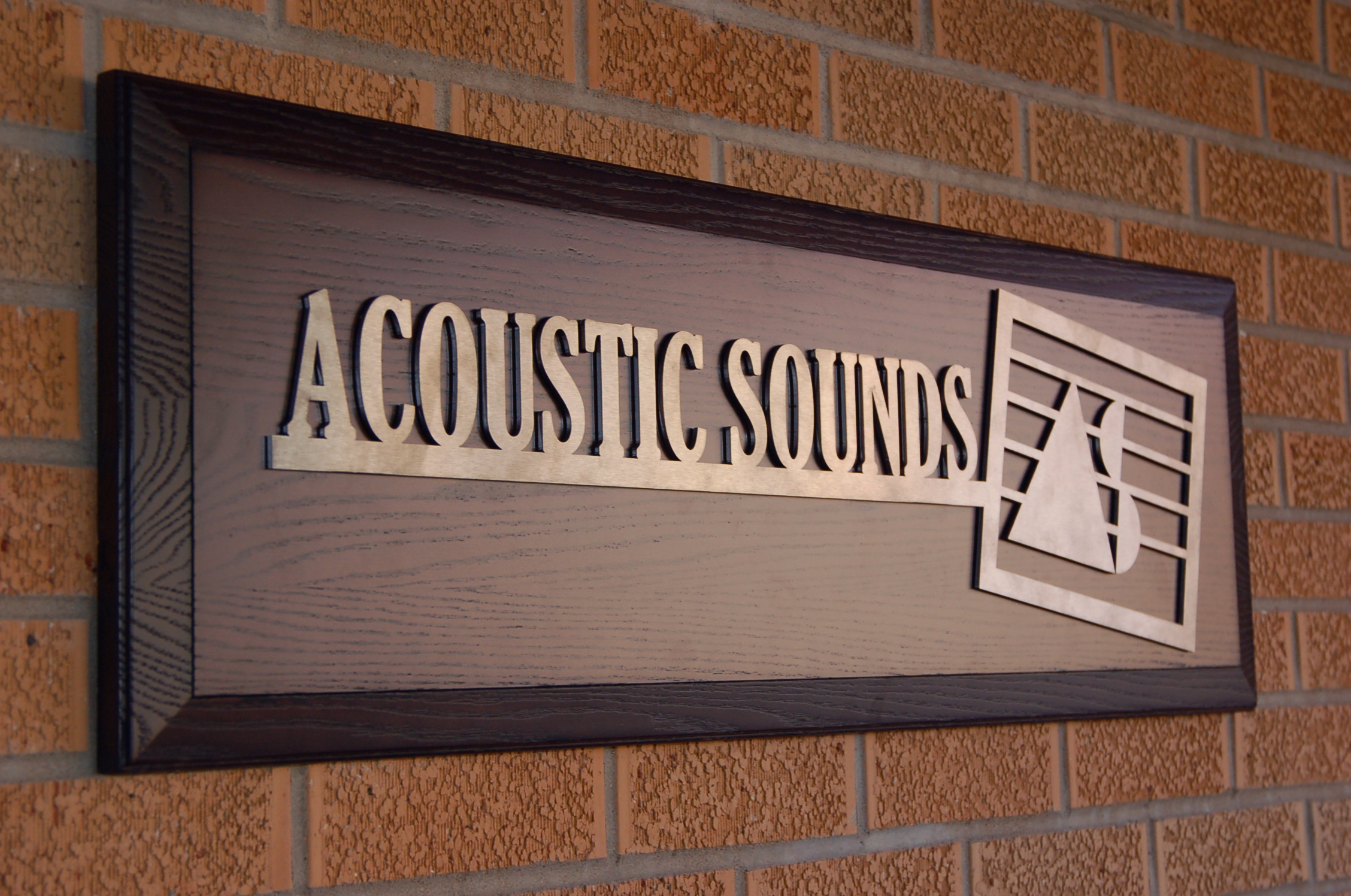
Sign

Front entrance

Acoustic Sounds, Inc. is a mail-order business specializing in the sale of audiophile vinyl LPs, SACDs, Reel-To-Reel album reissues (Analogue Productions Ultra Tape), DVD-Audios, high-quality CDs and high-end stereo equipment. Located in Salina, Kansas, United States. The business is owned and operated by Chad Kassem and as of 2016 employed 98 people.

== Company history ==
Kassem started Acoustic Sounds in 1986. In 1991, Kassem scouted out a 3,500-square-foot former dance studio in this mid-sized Kansas downtown. In 1992, Kassem launched a reissue label called Analogue Productions. Kassem contracted with record labels – majors and independents – and licensed the original analog master tapes of choice recordings. He then had those titles remastered and pressed on a superior grade of vinyl and then offered the finished product for sale through his Acoustic Sounds catalog and to wholesale accounts around the world. Analogue Productions now has more than 450 titles in print.

Also during this time, in 1993, Kassem began APO Records (Analogue Productions Originals), an original record label focused on recording authentic, living blues artists. APO’s first title – Jimmy Rogers/Blue Bird – won the 1995 W.C. Handy Traditional Blues Album of the Year. APO Records as of 2011 had 43 titles available.

== Recording studio in Gothic-style church ==
By 1994, Acoustic Sounds had again outgrown its space, and Kassem found a warehouse. In the meantime, Acoustic Sounds further branched into new musical endeavors with the addition of Blue Heaven Studios. In 1996, Kassem purchased an old Gothic-style church in downtown Salina, and also built a studio/concert hall there. The studio is also available for anyone to book session time and additionally is available for weddings.

== Record pressing plant launched ==
Kassem was photographed for the cover of Billboard magazine, a leading publication in the music industry, in a profile written by Chris Morris for the Aug. 17, 2002, issue titled "Audiophile Labels Put a New Spin On Vinyl." In 2011, Acoustic Sounds launched Quality Record Pressings (QRP), a modern record pressing plant. QRP operates record presses equipped with pioneering modifications, including adding microprocessors to the presses so that they will cycle based on temperature rather than the less accurate cycling by time. Today, QRP presses more than 1 million records each year, bringing legendary labels and artists — such as Verve, Impulse, Atlantic and Contemporary Records, to John Coltrane, Steely Dan, Stevie Ray Vaughan, and The Doors — as they’ve never been heard before to fans worldwide. All of the Analogue Productions reissues and the APO Records titles are now pressed at QRP and the pressing plant is also the exclusive manufacturer of LPs for the historic Jimi Hendrix catalog. QRP has also produced LPs for anniversary editions of the most revered music catalog of all time — The Beatles.

== SuperHiRez DSD/PCM download site launched ==
On August 28, 2013, Acoustic Sounds launched SuperHiRez.com, an Internet site selling mainstream title high-resolution album downloads from major record labels, produced using Direct Stream Digital (DSD) as well as PCM audio formats. Uncompressed DSD technology results in music that is as close to the master recording as possible and is the same technology employed in the manufacture of SACDs. Kassem said publicly he expected the service to offer as many as 500 titles by year-end. On September 4, 2013, Acoustic Sounds announced an agreement with Sony Music Entertainment to provide the company's new digital download service with albums that have been produced or remastered in Direct Stream Digital format. The deal followed an earlier agreement reached with Universal Music Group. On December 31, 2020, the decision was made to shutdown Acoustic Sounds Super HiRez digital downloads service after seven years due to streaming continuing to eclipse downloading.

== See also ==
- Analogue Productions
- Blue Heaven Studios
- Quality Record Pressings
