= Rawa Blues Festival =

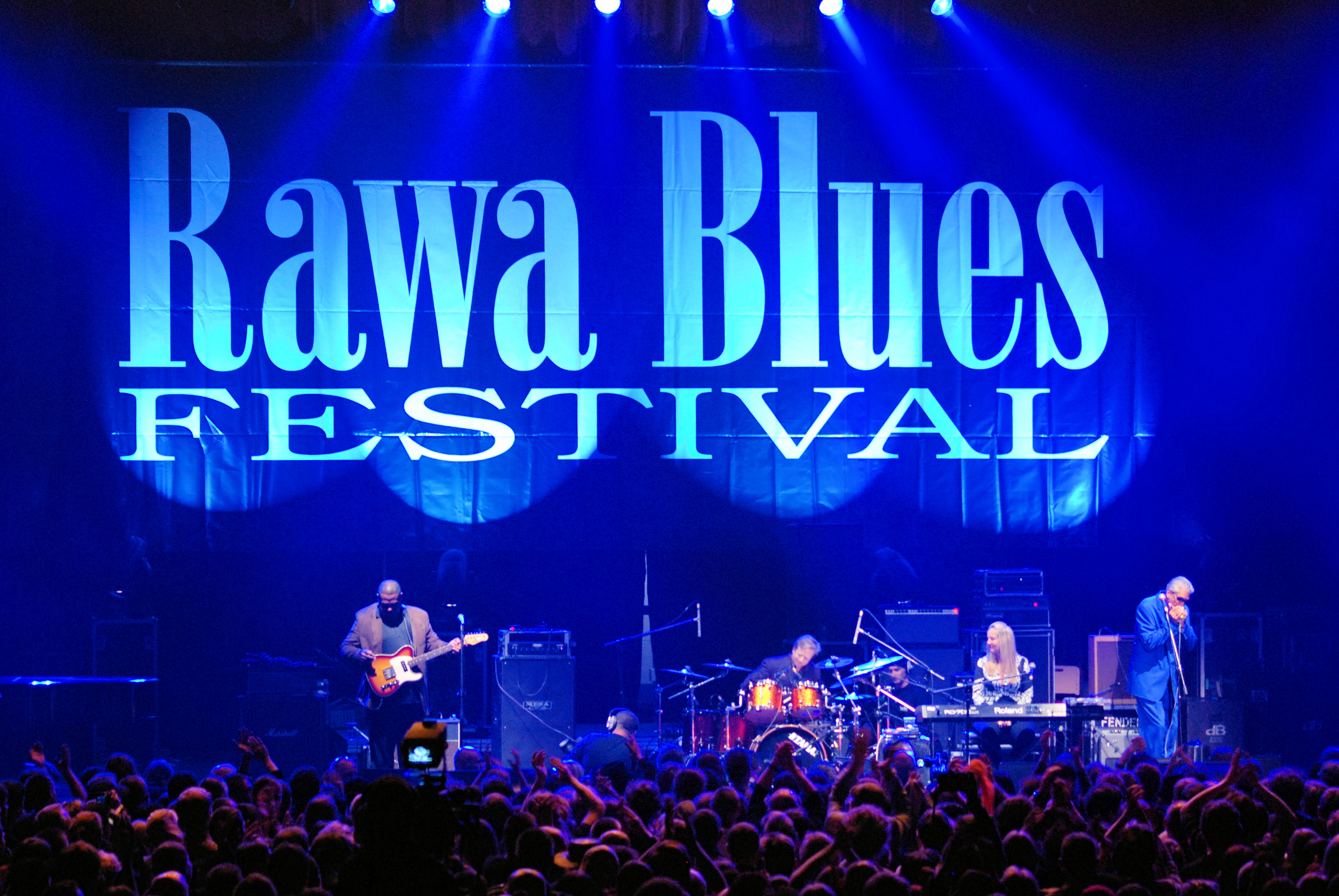
- Stage of Rawa Blues Festival
- Genre: Blues,
- Dates: First or second Saturday in October
- Location: Katowice in Poland
- Years active: 1981–present
- Attendance: 4,000–5,000
- Website: Official website

Rawa Blues Festival (pronounced rava) is the world's largest indoor blues festival. The festival was named after the Rawa River, which flows through the city of Katowice in Poland. The first edition was held in April 1981.

The festival is typically staged in October. The core concerts take place in the Spodek arena in Katowice, while early editions also used local clubs across the region. Rawa Blues Festival is structured around a main ("big") stage and a competitive "small stage" presented in the Spodek foyer; artists are selected by the festival's artistic council and the audience votes for the small-stage winner, who is invited to perform on the main stage.

Among the highlights of past festivals were: Luther Allison, Junior Wells, Koko Taylor, Carey Bell, John Cephas and Phil Wiggins, C. J. Chenier, Nora Jean Bruso, Rory Block, Little Charlie & the Nightcats, Keb' Mo', Robert Cray, JJ Grey & Mofro, James Blood Ulmer, Vernon Reid, Otis Taylor, Eric Sardinas, The Blind Boys of Alabama as well as many Polish blues musicians such as Tadeusz Nalepa, Slawek Wierzcholski, Dżem and many others.

== History ==
Rawa Blues Festival began in 1981 as the brainchild of Polish musician and promoter Ireneusz Dudek. According to The Blues Foundation, the inaugural event brought together about 20 Polish blues bands and drew roughly 500 listeners, and for its first decade the festival program featured Polish performers only.

For roughly its first decade the program focused mainly on Polish performers. In the early 1990s, the festival expanded its lineup beyond Poland, with the first international performer appearing in 1992. The festival has since been staged annually in Katowice, typically on the first or second Saturday in October, with the main concerts held at the city’s Spodek arena.

Since 2007 the festival has also hosted a programme of accompanying cultural events under the "Rawa Blues Cultural Crucible" umbrella (including visual-art happenings and exhibitions). Jerzy George Kossek founded the Rawa Blues Poetry Café at the festival in 2007.

In 2012 the festival received a Keeping the Blues Alive Award from the Blues Foundation (category: "Festival, International").

Since 2014 the programme has been expanded with additional concerts at the Polish National Radio Symphony Orchestra (NOSPR) concert hall in Katowice.

== See also ==
- List of blues festivals
- List of folk festivals
