= Margit Bakken =

Norwegian musician and songwriter

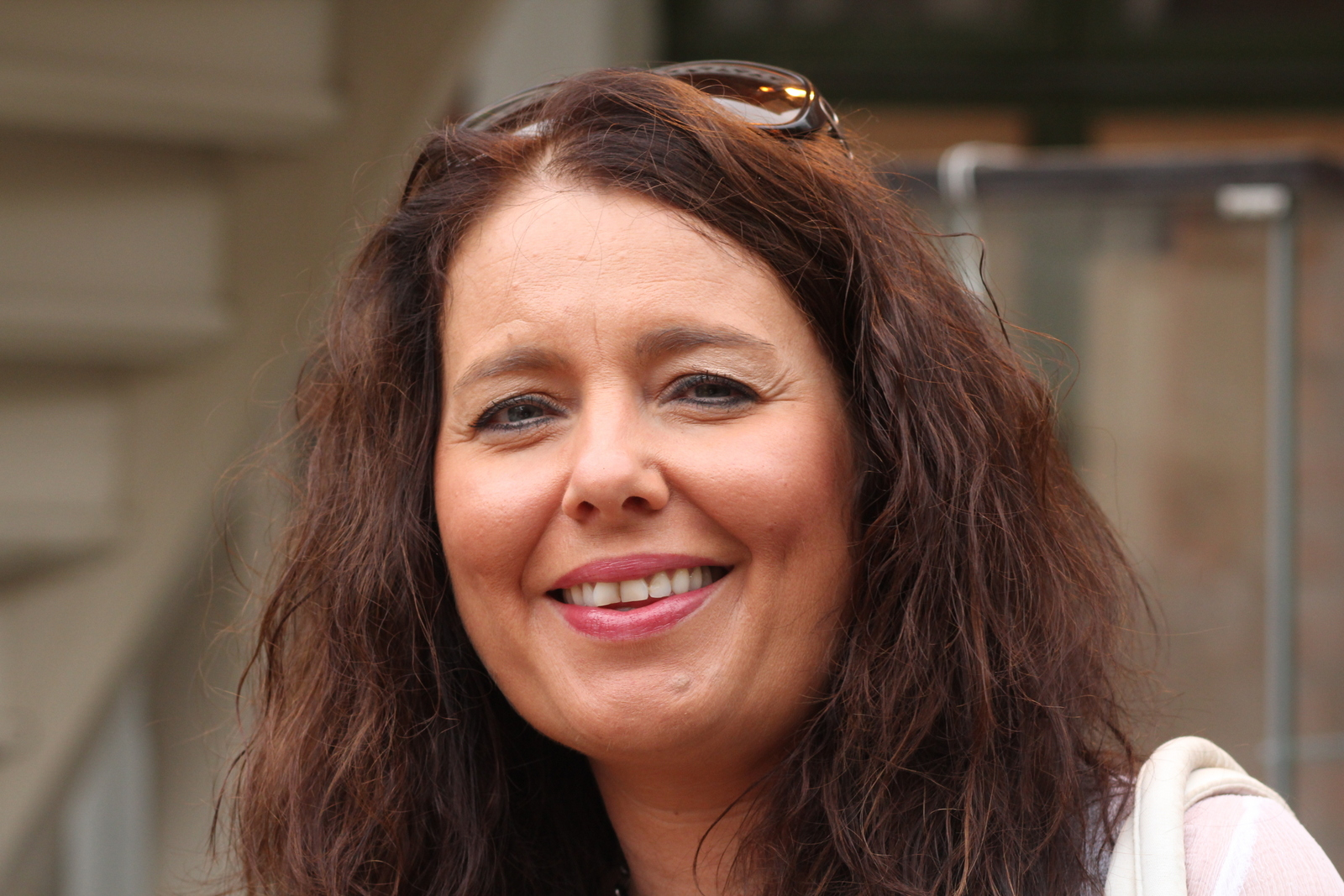
- Margit Bakken at Notodden Blues Festival, 2013

Background information
- Born: 8 April 1967 (age 59)
- Origin: Norway
- Genres: Blues, soul
- Occupations: Musician, composer
- Instruments: Vocals, guitar
- Years active: 1975–present

Margit Bakken (born 8 April 1967) is a Norwegian musician (vocals, guitar) and songwriter. She is one of the most established blues musicians in Norway, and often performs with Rita Engedalen as the duo Women in Blues. She has performed as a singer since the age of eight. In 1997, she was a contestant in the Norwegian version of the musical television show European Soundmix Show, where she was one of the finalists.

Her debut album, On The Other Side, was released in 2009. In 2012, she released her second album, Women in Blues, with Rita Engedalen.

== Discography ==
- On the Other Side (2009)
- Women in Blues (2012), with Rita Engedalen
