= Analogue Productions =

American record label

Analogue Productions is a record label specializing in the manufacture and distribution of reissue LP record albums, CDs and SACDs that primarily include jazz, blues, rock, folk and classical styles of music. The company is a division of Acoustic Sounds, Inc. founded by music entrepreneur Chad Kassem in Salina, Kansas, United States in 1992.

== First reissued album released ==
That year, Kassem reissued his first album, Virgil Thomson's The Plow That Broke The Plains, originally released by Vanguard Records in the 1970s. Through his personal passion for record collecting and then buying and selling used LPs, Kassem had learned how difficult it was to find original records in mint condition. So he started Analogue Productions to begin reissuing his favorite titles on LP. The company has since expanded its operation to include reissues on CD and SACD.

== Processes instituted for quality control ==
Analogue Productions audio mastering for its reissued albums is done using only the original analogue master tapes, hence the name of the label. Analogue Productions LP reissues feature thicker grade vinyl pressed at 180 grams weight or better, making for superior audiophile reproduction.

== Record pressing plant launched ==
Analogue Productions initially produced its records through record pressing plants in Los Angeles, California, and in Germany. However in 2011, Kassem launched his own record pressing plant, Quality Record Pressings. QRP sought to improve premier audiophile pressings, including introducing innovations never before tried in the record pressing industry. To date, Analogue Productions has released more than 300 previously recorded albums from well-known historic record labels, including Fantasy Records, Blue Note Records, Impulse! Records, Verve Records, Prestige Records and Columbia Records.

== See also ==
- Acoustic Sounds, Inc.
- Blue Heaven Studios
- Quality Record Pressings
