= Rita Engedalen =

Norwegian musician and songwriter

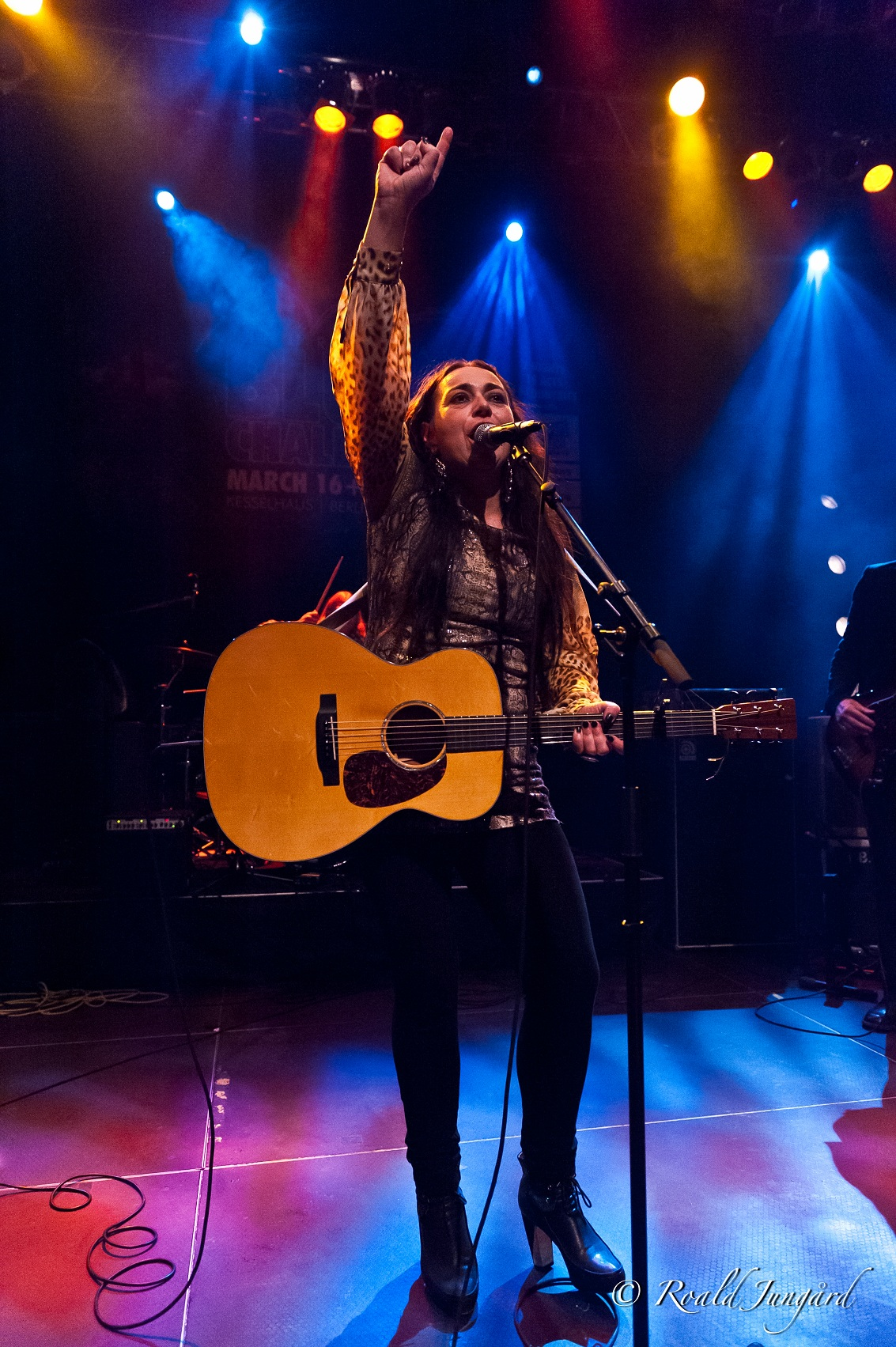
- Rita Engedalen in 2012

Background information
- Born: 17 December 1971 (age 54)
- Origin: Norway
- Genres: Blues
- Occupations: Singer, guitarist, songwriter
- Instruments: Vocals, guitar

Rita Engedalen (born 17 December 1971) is a Norwegian blues musician (vocals, guitar) and songwriter. Rita Engedalen and Margit Bakken were top billing at the Sunflower Blues Festival in August 2015 in Clarksdale, Mississippi, United States. A few days later she performed at the Shack Up Inn in a smaller setting.

== Career ==
Engedalen is one of the most established blues musicians in Norway, and often performs with Margit Bakken as the duo Women in Blues. She won the blues category of the Spelleman Award in 2006. She won the second European Blues Challenge in 2012.

== Discography ==
- Hear My Song (Bluestown Records, 2004)
- Heaven ain't Ready for Me Yet (Bluestown Records, 2006)
- The Tree Still Standing (Grammofon, 2008)
- Women in Blues (2012), with Margit Bakken

Awards
Preceded by Kåre Virud Band	Recipient of the Spelleman Award in the class blues 2006	Succeeded by Kjetil Grande
Preceded by No blues award	Recipient of the Gammleng Award in the class blues 2010	Succeeded by No blues award
