= Dennis Gruenling =

- Born: New Jersey, United States
- Genre: Electric blues
- Occupations: Harmonicist, songwriter, record producer, radio DJ
- Instrument: Harmonica
- Years active: 1990s–present
- Labels: Back Bender Records, CD Baby, Vizztone
- Website: Official website

Dennis Gruenling is an American electric blues harmonicist, songwriter, record producer and radio DJ. He has released seven albums since 1999, with his most recent being 2016's Ready or Not. His contributions to other musician's albums has included stints playing the harmonica, audio engineering and mixing, production and album sleeve artwork. Gruenling has also been employed for over a decade as a DJ on WFDU college radio. His dynamic harmonica playing style has been inspired variously by Little Walter, Lester Young and Illinois Jacquet.

Gruenling, who plays both chromatic and diatonic harmonica, has been awarded the title of 'Best Modern Blues Harmonica Player' three years in a row by Real Blues magazine.

In 2007, Adam Gussow described Gruenling as having "limitless potential". In 2019, he won a Blues Music Award for 'Instrumentalist - Harmonica'.

== Biography ==
=== Early days ===
Gruenling was born in New Jersey, United States. He acquired his first harmonica in his teenage years as a Christmas present from a family friend. With an earlier healthy interest in music, Gruenling then heard Harp Attack! (1990), an album featuring the harmonica playing of James Cotton, Junior Wells, Carey Bell, and Billy Branch. Gruenling later stated "I made my uncle play the record for me and I was blown away by what I heard. I hadn’t heard real blues players before – or real blues music in general. I was knocked out by the music and the harmonica playing." Further inspired by records he purchased by Cotton, Wells, Little Walter, George "Harmonica" Smith and Big Walter Horton, Gruenling set about teaching himself to play to an accomplished standard. Having dropped out of school and moved with his then girlfriend to New Orleans, he continued to practice and largely self-learn the instrument before returning to New Jersey in 1994. He worked in a number of local bands around New Brunswick, New Jersey, before forming his own outfit in 1998, and then recording his debut album, Dennis Gruenling and Jump Time (1999). It was released by Back Bender Records, Gruenling's own label.

=== Mid career ===
At that time, Gruenling alternated between his Jump Time line-up that played mainly jump blues and boogie-woogie, and a smaller unit that favored a Chicago blues styling. He heard both Rod Piazza and William Clarke on blues radio, and regularly frequented both of their shows when they played locally. He gave Piazza a copy of his recording which led to a friendship that lasts to this day. Up All Night (2000) and That's Right (2001) followed, the latter featuring Kenny Davern on clarinet on a couple of the tracks. In 2000, Gruenling appeared at the Chicago Blues Festival.

However, Gruenling found it harder to sustain his own band and he moved towards working on other musician's material for a number of years. He contributed to albums by Gina Sicilia and Cartel in this period. In 2007, David Malachowski played at the Lake George Blues Blast, and assembled a band featuring Gruenling. The same year, Gruenling commenced on a project to record a tribute album to Little Walter, and ended up working alongside Kim Wilson, Rick Estrin and Steve Guyger, plus Rusty Zinn on guitar, to record I Just Keep Lovin' Him: A Tribute to Little Walter (2008). Gruenling and Guyger were described as "two youthful, white virtuosos" of the harmonica. The album included a cover version of Little Walter's "If You Were Mine", with the vocals supplied by Gruenling's wife, Gina Fox.

In putting together a band to support the album, Gruenling turned to the Detroit-based guitarist Doug Deming, which led to them and Deming's backing ensemble, the Jewel Tones, collaborating on various recordings. These included, Rockin' All Day (2012), with Gruenling featuring Doug Deming & the Jewel Tones on an album that was recorded in Sarasota, Florida by Ed Kinder, and in Glen Ridge, New Jersey by Dave Gross. In August that year, the combination toured the East Coast undertaking 28 shows in 26 days.

Teaching blues harmonica playing has been part of Gruenling's passion, and he has assisted at workshops and conventions including Jon Gindick's Harmonica Jam Camps, David Barrett's Harmonica Masterclass, and Joe Filisko's class at the Old Town School of Folk Music. He also undertakes private lessons both online and locally. He has participated in other projects such as David Malachowski & the Woodstock All-Stars.

In 2010, the History of the Blues Harmonica Concert featuring David Barrett, Joe Filisko, Kinya Pollard, John Garcia, Rusty Zinn, and Gruenling was another Back Bender Records release. As a hobby, Gruenling collects and trades vintage harp microphones.

Gruenling featuring Doug Deming & the Jewel Tones played at the 2014 Bradenton Blues Festival.

His album, Ready or Not (2016), is Gruenling's first with all original material, and follows a three year long touring schedule.

His 2019 joint recording with Nick Moss, Luck Guy!, was chosen as a 'Favorite Blues Album' by AllMusic. In May 2020, the Nick Moss Band featuring Dennis Gruenling won two Blues Music Awards for 'Band of the Year' and 'Traditional Blues Album of the Year' for Lucky Guy!.

=== Radio work ===
On the WFDU college radio station based in Teaneck, New Jersey, Gruenling is the weekly host of Blues & the Beat.

== Discography ==
=== Albums ===
Year of release	Album title	Record label	Accreditation
1999	Dennis Gruenling and Jump Time!	Back Bender Records / CD Baby	Dennis Gruenling and Jump Time
2000	Up All Night	Back Bender Records / CD Baby	Dennis Gruenling featuring Sandy Mack
2001	That's Right!	Back Bender Records / CD Baby	Dennis Gruenling and Jump Time
2006	Volume 1	Back Bender Records / CD Baby	Dennis Gruenling and Richard Sleigh
2008	I Just Keep Lovin' Him: A Tribute to Little Walter	Back Bender Records / CD Baby	Dennis Gruenling
2012	Rockin' All Day	Back Bender Records / VizzTone	Dennis Gruenling featuring Doug Deming & the Jewel Tones
2016	Ready or Not	Back Bender Records / VizzTone	Dennis Gruenling featuring Doug Deming & the Jewel Tones
2018	The High Cost of Low Living	Alligator Records	Nick Moss Band featuring Dennis Gruenling
2019	Lucky Guy!	Alligator Records	Nick Moss Band featuring Dennis Gruenling
2023	Get Your Back Into It!	Alligator Records	Nick Moss Band featuring Dennis Gruenling

=== Guest work ===
Year of release	Album title	Accreditation	Contribution
2001	That's What I'm Talkin' About	Sandy Mack	Audio Engineer, Mixing
2003	Rhumba Lee	Jumpin' Jack	Harmonica
2006	Take the Gamble	Dave Gross	Harmonica
2007	Allow Me to Confess	Gina Sicilia	Harmonica
2007	Cartel	Cartel	Harmonica
2007	Shadows and Cracks	Peter Karp	Harmonica
2008	Crawling the Walls	Dave Gross	Harmonica
2008	Hey Sugar	Gina Sicilia	Harmonica
2009	Falling Through the Cracks	Doug Deming & the Jewel Tones	Harmonica
2010	On the Floor	Matt Hill	Harmonica
2010	Manifestation	Rusty	Artwork, Design
2010	Painted Blue	Shayna Goldstein	Harmonica
2012	What's It Gonna Take	Doug Deming & the Jewel Tones	Harmonica, Co-Producer, Mixing, Artwork Assistance, Composer: "Bella's Boogie"
2013	It Wasn't Real	Gina Sicilia	Harmonica
2015	Excuses Plenty	Hank Mowery	Harmonica
2016	The Arson's Match: Peter Karp, Live in NYC with Special Guest, Mick Taylor	Peter Karp	Harmonica

== See also ==
- List of electric blues musicians
- List of harmonica blues musicians
