= Bradenton Riverwalk =

Public green space in Bradenton, Florida

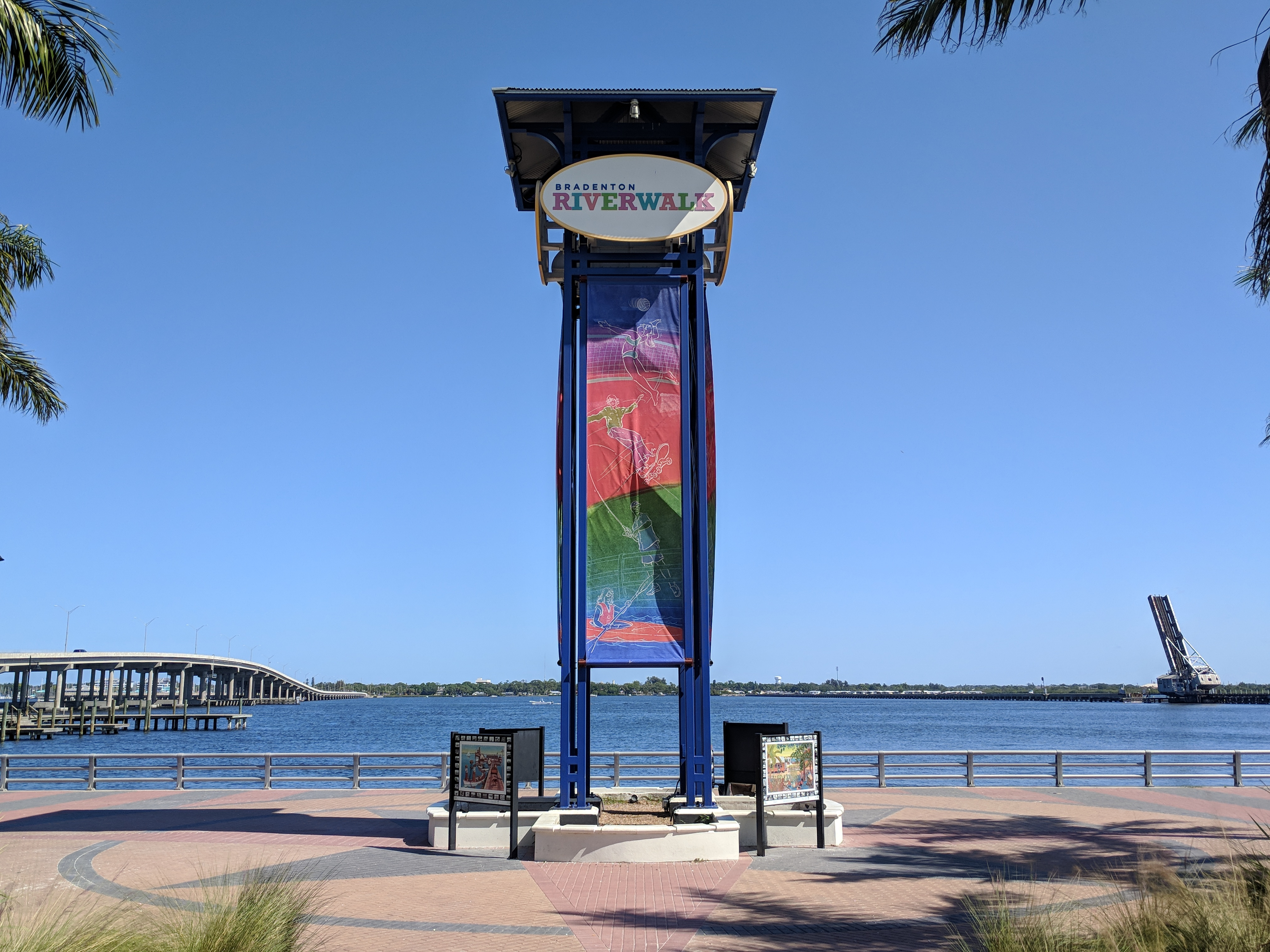
- Tower plaza with Manatee River in the background
- Interactive map of Bradenton Riverwalk
- Location: Bradenton, Florida
- Coordinates: 27°29′58″N 82°34′02″W
- Area: 5.0 acres (0.020 km^{2})
- Opened: October 18, 2012
- Designer: Kimley-Horn
- Operator: City of Bradenton
- Open: Year round
- Public transit: Manatee County Area Transit (MCAT)
- Website: realizebradenton.com/riverwalk

Bradenton Riverwalk (known locally as the Riverwalk) is a 1.5-mile-long (2.4 km) public green space located along the Manatee River in Bradenton, Florida, between Business US 41 and South Tamiami Trail (US 301 / US 41 concurrently). The five-acre (2.0 ha) park opened to the public on October 18, 2012 and features a skatepark, 400-seat amphitheater, playgrounds, and a splash pad. The area is maintained by the city of Bradenton and the nonprofit organization Realize Bradenton.

== History ==
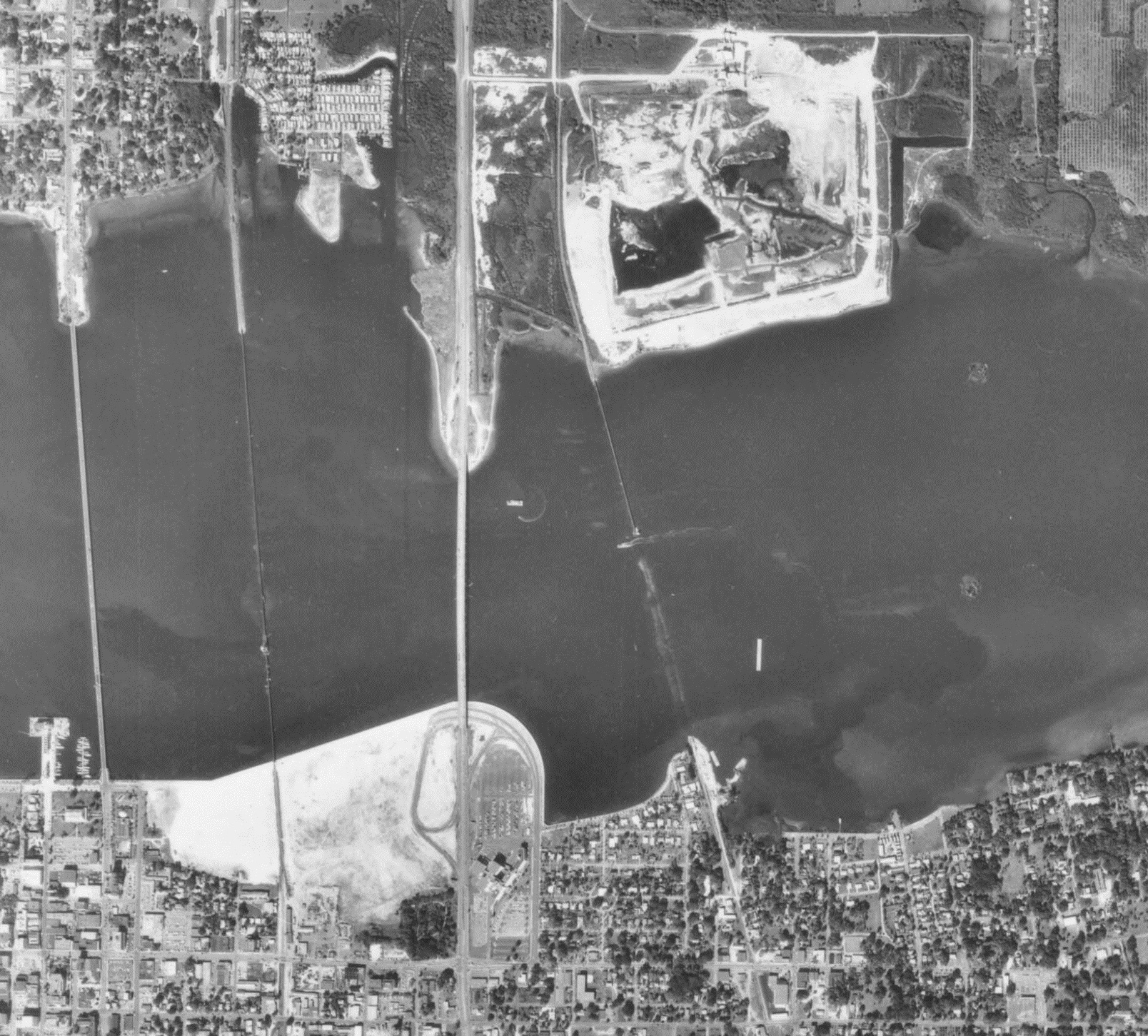
Downtown Bradenton area in December 1970

In the 1960s Bradenton dredged the Manatee River for silt, to add 50 acres (0.20 km^{2}) of land adjacent to its downtown area. The area was dubbed "The Sand Pile" due to the river dredging projects. The park, Anthony T. Rossi Waterfront Park (or known simply as Waterfront Park or Rossi Park), was originally developed in the 1980s with the help of a federal grant. The boundaries of Rossi Park were between the Green Bridge and Hernando de Soto Bridge . The Bradenton Downtown Development Authority (BDDA) hired Kimley-Horn in June 2010 to design a substantial improvement to Rossi Park and the surrounding waterfront area. The construction of the Riverwalk broke ground in September 2011 and opened to the public on October 18, 2012.

== Features ==
The Bradenton Riverwalk spans from the Green Bridge, near Bishop Museum of Science and Nature, to 2nd Street East, adjacent to Manatee Memorial Hospital. The Riverwalk includes playgrounds, splash pad, a lawn for picnics, a day dock for boaters, a skatepark, a botanical walk, sand volleyball courts, and a 400-seat Mosaic Amphitheater.

Public art is displayed throughout the Riverwalk area. One of the permanent art collections displayed is Postcards from the Friendly City. The collection consists of various large-scale art panels, or "postcards," depicting the history of the Manatee River and the Bradenton area.

Several weekly, monthly, and annual events are held at the Riverwalk. These events range from a weekly farmers' market and a seasonal "Music in the Park" family-friendly live music series to annual events such as Bradenton Blues Festival and ArtSlam. The events attract approximately 110,000 people annually to downtown Bradenton.

== Eastern extension ==
In April 2017, Bradenton contracted Kimley-Horn and Associates, Inc. again to create a master plan for an eastern extension of the Bradenton Riverwalk. The eastern extension extended the Riverwalk east to Manatee Mineral Springs Park and Manatee Village Historical Park.

The city also bought 1.5 acres (0.61 ha) of land north of Manatee Mineral Springs Park for $700,000 to expand the existing park and to ensure interconnectivity with the eastern expansion of the Riverwalk. The eastern extension opened in September 2022.

== Gallery ==
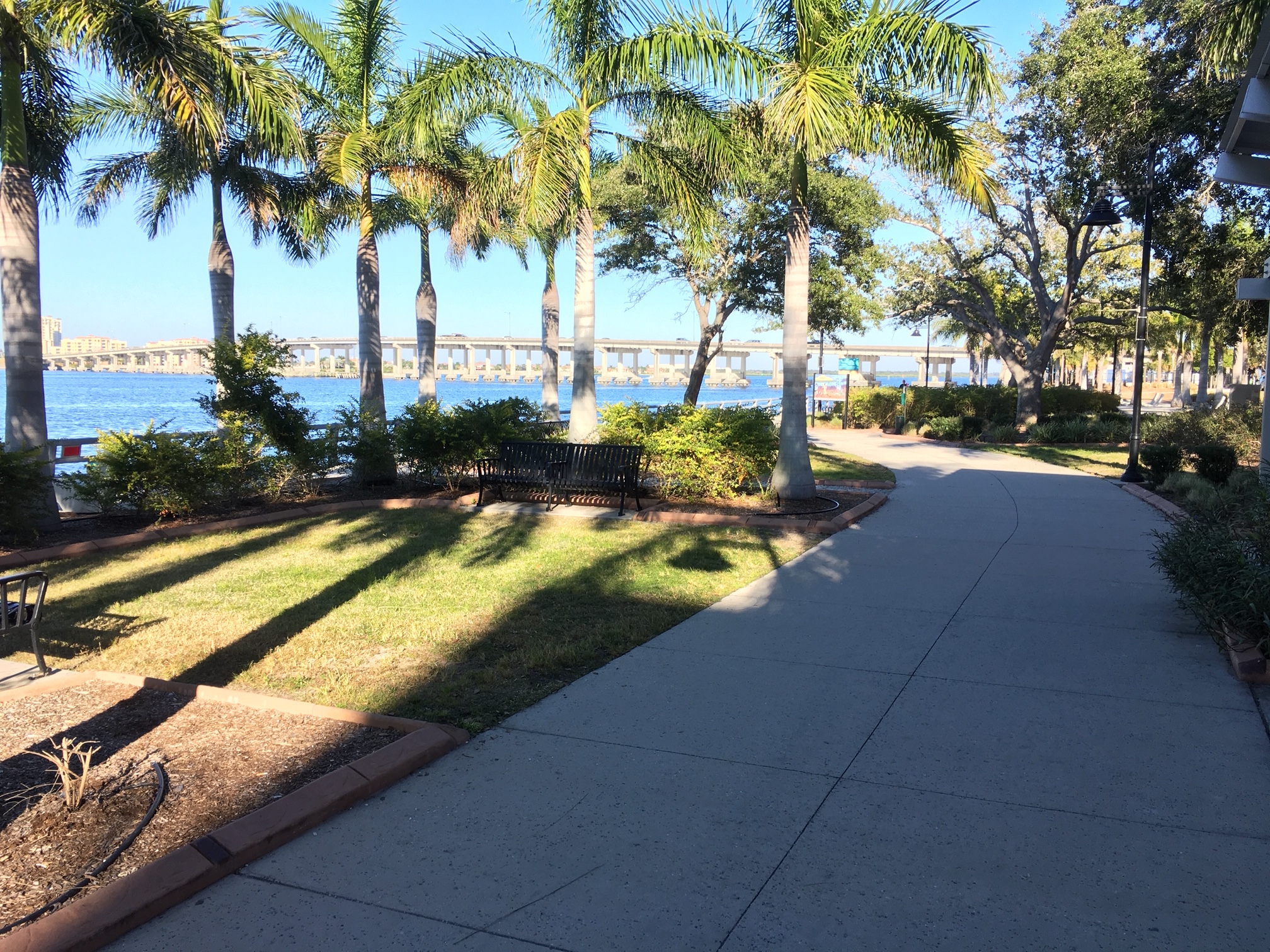

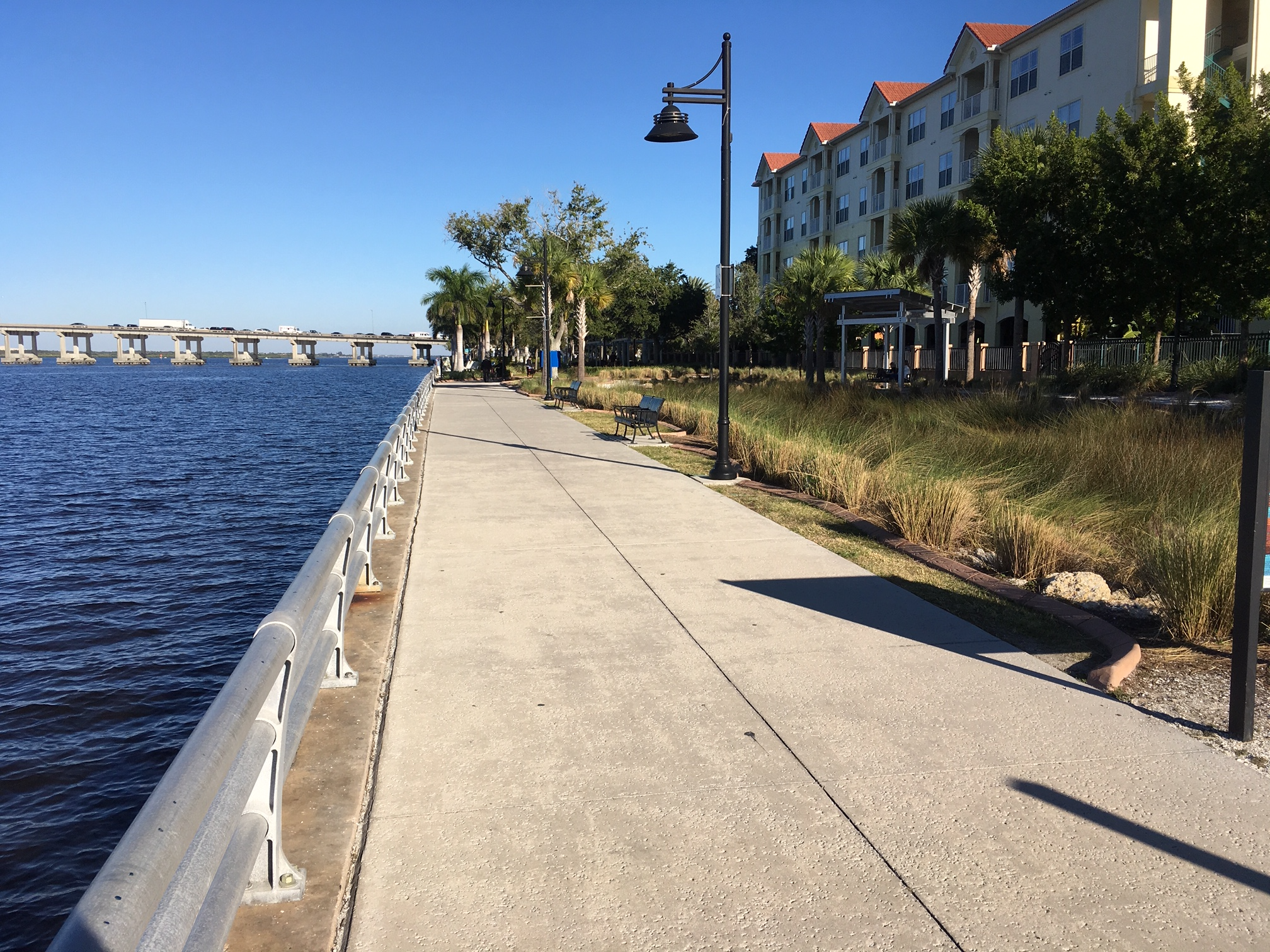
