= Indian Springs Park =

Indian Springs Park may refer to:

- Indian Springs State Park, located near Jackson and Flovilla, Georgia
- Indian Springs Park (Davenport, Iowa)
- Manatee Mineral Springs Park, formally known as Indian Springs Park, located in Bradenton, Florida
