= Bradenton Blues Festival =

Annual music festival in Bradenton, Florida, USA

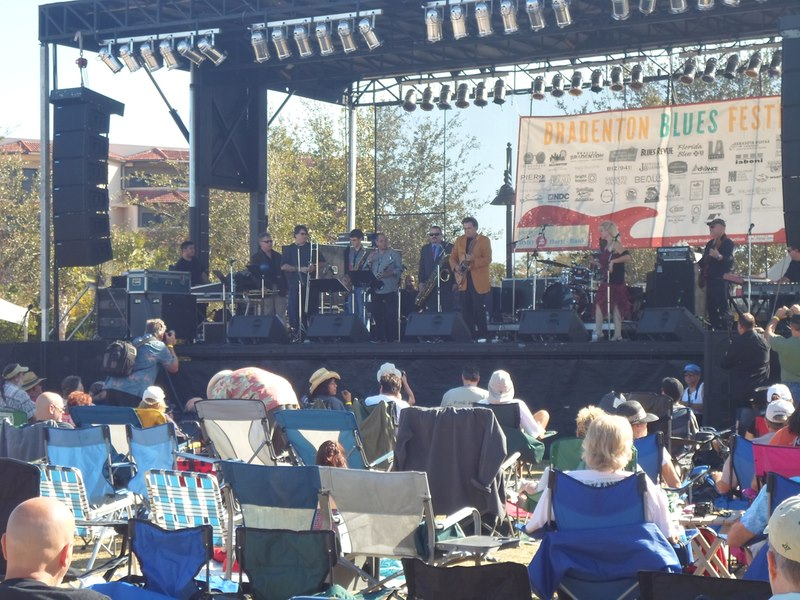
Steve Arvey Horn Band at 2012 Bradenton Blues Festival

The Bradenton Blues Festival is an annual festival held in December in Bradenton, Florida. It is organized by Realize Bradenton, a group which promotes Bradenton's Downtown as a destination for arts, culture, history and sports. The performers are both national and regional blues artists. The event takes place at Bradenton Riverwalk, which opened in October 2012.

== 2012 Festival ==
The inaugural event on December 1, 2012 featured Ruthie Foster, Kenny Neal, Biscuit Miller, Johnny Sansone, Southern Hospitality, Homemade Jamz Blues Band, The Steve Arvey Horn Band featuring Henry Lawrence, and Ben Prestage. Harry Potter book series illustrator Mary GrandPré produced a soft-geometry style poster for the event, the proceeds of which went to support local children's music programs. The festival attracted a crowd of about 3000.

== 2013 Festival ==
The December 7, 2013 event attracted about 3,500 listeners, and featured John Németh, Anthony Gomes, Trampled Under Foot, Eddie Shaw, Shemekia Copeland, Johnny Rawls, Albert Castiglia, and Doug Deming.

== 2014 Festival ==
The event, which took place on Saturday, December 6, 2014 at downtown Bradenton's Riverwalk, attracted an audience of more than 3,200. Live streaming of the festival, a cooperative effort of Realize Bradenton, Blues Music Magazine and METV, had 3,250 views from all 50 states and 37 foreign countries, including music lovers from Canada, UK, Australia, Germany, France, Hungary, Finland, Brazil, Spain, Greece, Ireland, Thailand, Romania, South Africa, China, Japan, Italy, Belize, Belgium, Mexico, and more. New this year was a food court with southern-inspired cuisine from seven Bradenton-area restaurants and craft beer produced specifically for the festival by Darwin Brewing Co. Acts on the bill for 2014 included Dennis Gruenling, Doug Deming & the Jewel Tones, E.G. Kight, Samantha Fish, Billy Branch & The Sons of Blues, Lil’ Ed & The Blues Imperials, Jimmy Thackery & The Drivers, Marcia Ball, and Dave Muskett.

== 2015 Festival ==
The 2015 festival took place on December 5, 2015 and was attended by over 3000 fans. The Bradenton Herald described the festival as "The biggest live music event in Bradenton" and went on to say the 2015 event "was as big a hit this year as it has been each year since it began in 2012." In 2015, website Blues 411 named the Bradenton Blues Festival "Best Festival of the Year." The line-up featured In Layman Terms, Girls with Guitars, Super Chikan and the Fighting Cocks, Larry Garner, Mike Zito and The Wheel, Joanna Connor, Rick Estrin & The Nightcats, and Janiva Magness.

== 2016 Festival ==
The 2016 Festival occurred on December 3, 2016, with a "Blues Appetizer" concert on December 2. In this, its fifth year, the festival was promoted as a weekend-long event.

Kicking-off the festival weekend was the free "Blues Appetizer", featuring Ari and the Alibis and Damon Fowler. The main festival concert was on December 3, 2016, featuring the Slam Allen Band, Sugar Ray Norcia and the Blue Tones, Larry McCray, Jason Ricci, Victor Wainwright & the Wildroots, The Golden State/Lone Star Revue, and headliner Ronnie Baker Brooks. In addition, Ilana Katz Katz played between each set. The weekend wrapped up with a Blues Brunch on December 4, 2016, featuring Doug Deming & the Jewel Tones.

== 2019 Festival ==
The Bradenton Blues Festival Weekend starts on December 6, 2019, with a free 'Blues Appetizer' concert. The Bradenton Blues Festival itself is scheduled for December 7.
