= Peter Karp =

Peter Karp may refer to:

- Peter Karp (singer), American roots-based folk and blues singer, songwriter, guitarist, and pianist
- Peter Karp (scientist), American computational biologist
