= D'Angelico Guitars =

American musical instrument manufacturer

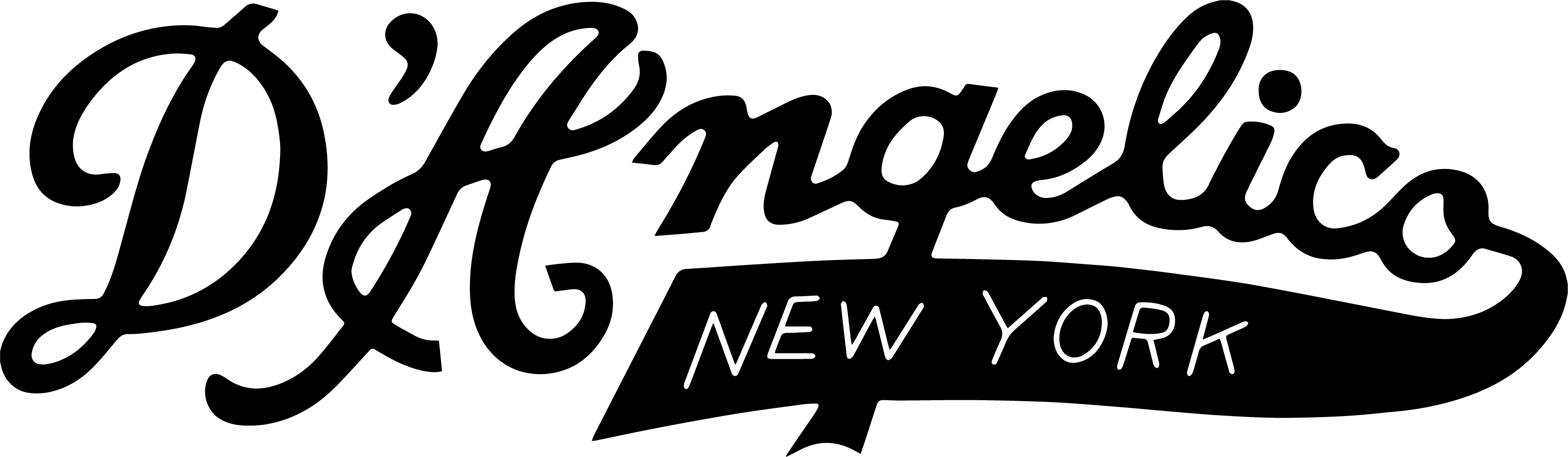

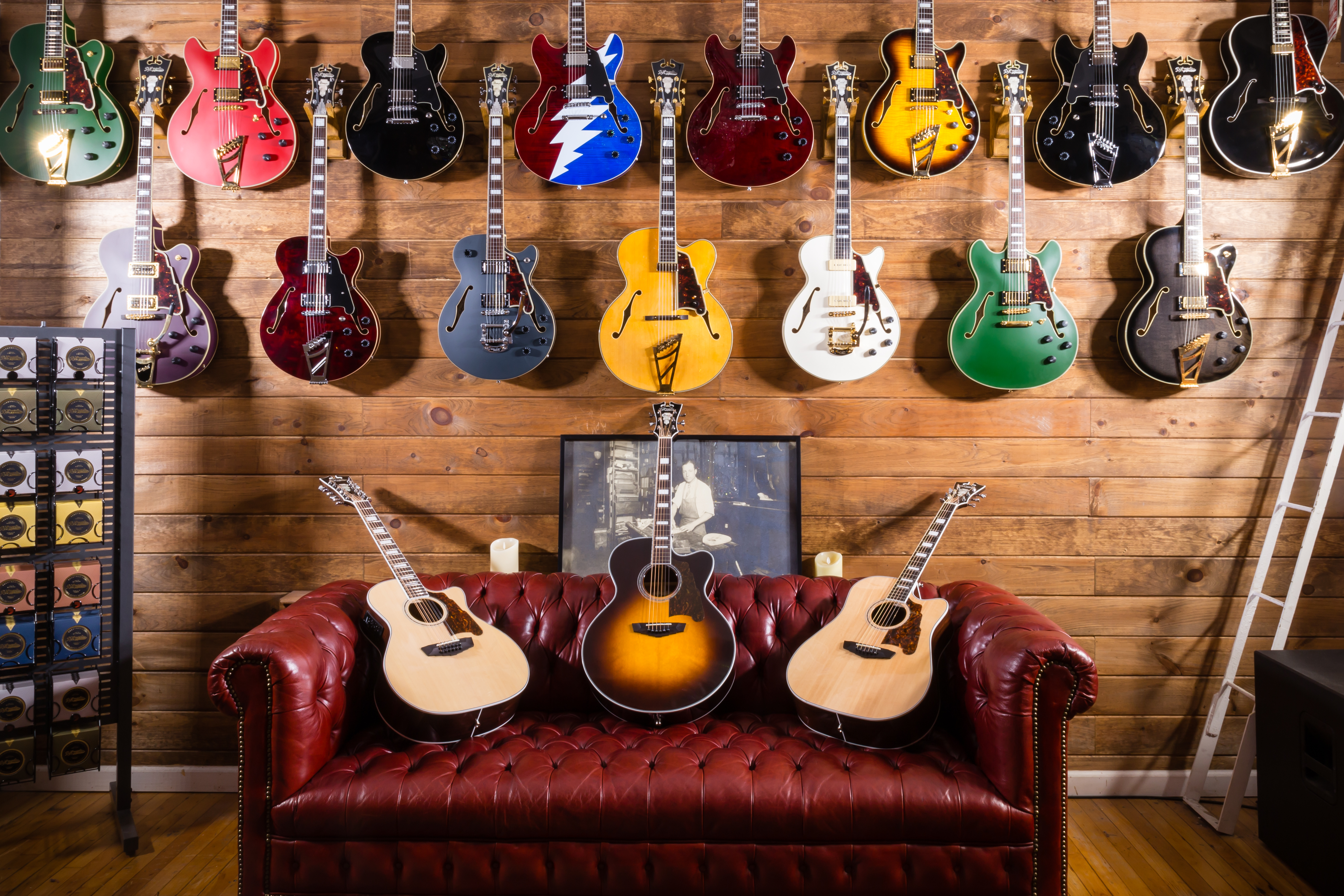
- D'Angelico guitars at a showroom in 2017
- Company type: Private
- Industry: Musical instruments
- Founded: 1932; 94 years ago
- Founder: John D'Angelico
- Headquarters: Manhattan, NY, United States
- Area served: Worldwide
- Key people: John Ferolito Jr., Chairman, Brenden Cohen, President and CEO
- Products: Electric, acoustic and classical guitars, basses, ukuleles
- Website: dangelicoguitars.com

D'Angelico Guitars of America is an American musical instrument importer based in Manhattan, New York. The brand was initially founded by master luthier John D'Angelico in 1932, in Manhattan's Little Italy. In 1999, Steve Pisani, John Ferolito Jr., and Brenden Cohen purchased the D'Angelico Guitars trademark. Cohen serves as the brand's president and CEO. Original D'Angelico guitars are collector's items and have been used by musicians including Pete Townshend, Eric Clapton, Drake Bell, Bucky Pizzarelli, Chet Atkins, and Chuck Wayne. The D'Angelico Mel Bay New Yorker model was featured on the cover of the Mel Bay Publications' guitar method books for decades.

In 2011, guitars by D'Angelico were included in the 'Guitar Heroes' exhibition at the Metropolitan Museum of Art in New York City.

Current range of products manufactured by D'Angelico include solid-body, hollow-body, and acoustic guitars, and ukuleles.

== History ==
=== Founding ===
Born in New York in 1905 John D'Angelico was apprenticed at the age of nine to his grand uncle Raphael Ciani, an expert violin and mandolin maker. This apprenticeship would become the basis for construction principles he later incorporated into his archtop guitars. After Ciani died D'Angelico took over the management of the business, but he didn't like having to supervise the 15 employees. As a result, he left and founded in 1932 D'Angelico Guitars at 40 Kenmare Street in Manhattan's Little Italy.

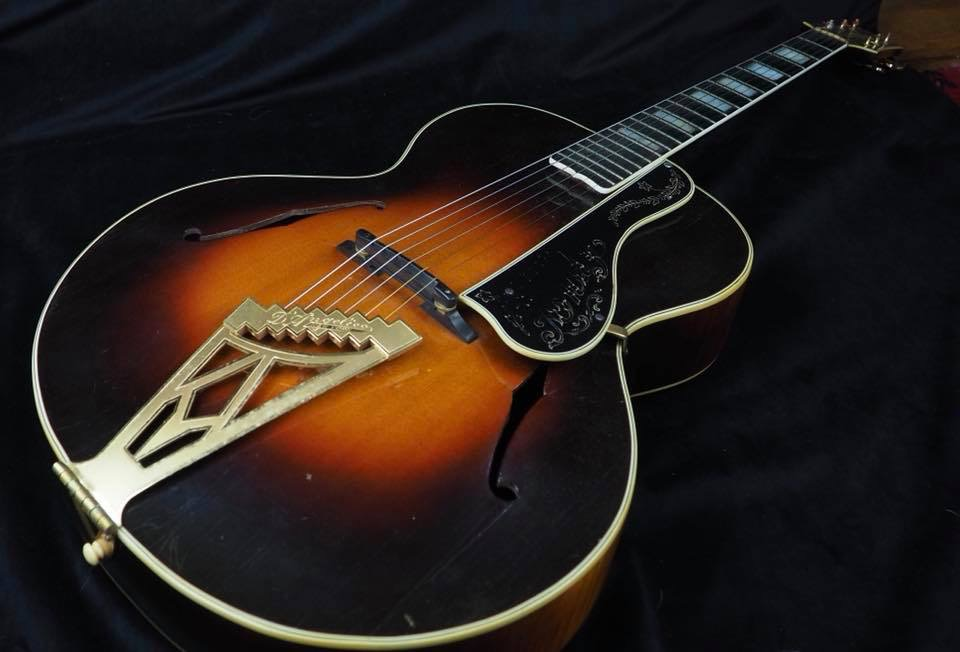
1933 arch-top guitar

While D'Angelico's craftsmanship was not always exemplary the performance of his guitars established him as the premier maker of archtop guitars. His reputation later brought offers from larger companies, but ultimately he decided to keep his operation under his own name. During the late 1930s, when production was at its peak, D'Angelico only had the assistance of two workers. Despite being handmade the company's guitars were no more expensive than similar mass-produced guitars produced by Epiphone and Gibson.

Among D'Angelico's employees were Vincent 'Jimmy' DiSerio, who worked for D'Angelico from 1932 to 1959, and Jimmy D'Aquisto who joined the company as an apprentice in 1952.

D'Angelico had a heart attack in 1959 and also parted ways with DiSerio who left to work at the Favilla guitar company. As a result, he closed the business but soon reopened it after Jimmy D'Aquisto who was unable to find work, convinced him to do so. After several more heart attacks John D'Angelico died in 1964 at the age of 59. D'Aquisto, then bought the business from the D'Angelico family but a poor business decision lost him the right to the D'Angelico name.

=== Relaunch ===
In 1999, Brenden Cohen, John Ferolito Jr., and Steve Pisani purchased the D'Angelico Guitars trademark from John Ferolito Sr., cofounder of Arizona Beverages. In 2010, Cohen and Pisani began constructing a new showroom for the brand. D'Angelico Guitars was officially launched in 2011. That year, original D'Angelico guitars were honored at the Metropolitan Museum of Art as part of an exhibition titled "Guitar Heroes: Legendary Craftsmen from Italy to New York."

D'Angelico began broadening their product line, first starting with reissues of original John D'Angelico designs, and then introducing new semihollow and acoustic models.

By 2014, the brand had 125 partnerships in the United States and an additional 200 international dealers.

In 2014, D'Angelico Guitars sponsored Mountain Jam, a summer music festival in eastern New York.

The brand launched its first line of acoustic guitars in January 2015 when it displayed 150 guitars at the National Association of Music Merchants' annual trade show in Anaheim, California.

In 2016, D'Angelico Guitars won the award for Best in Show for Companies to Watch at the NAMM show.

In 2020, D'Angelico Guitars acquired Supro USA and Pigtronix.

== Instruments ==
=== Early ===
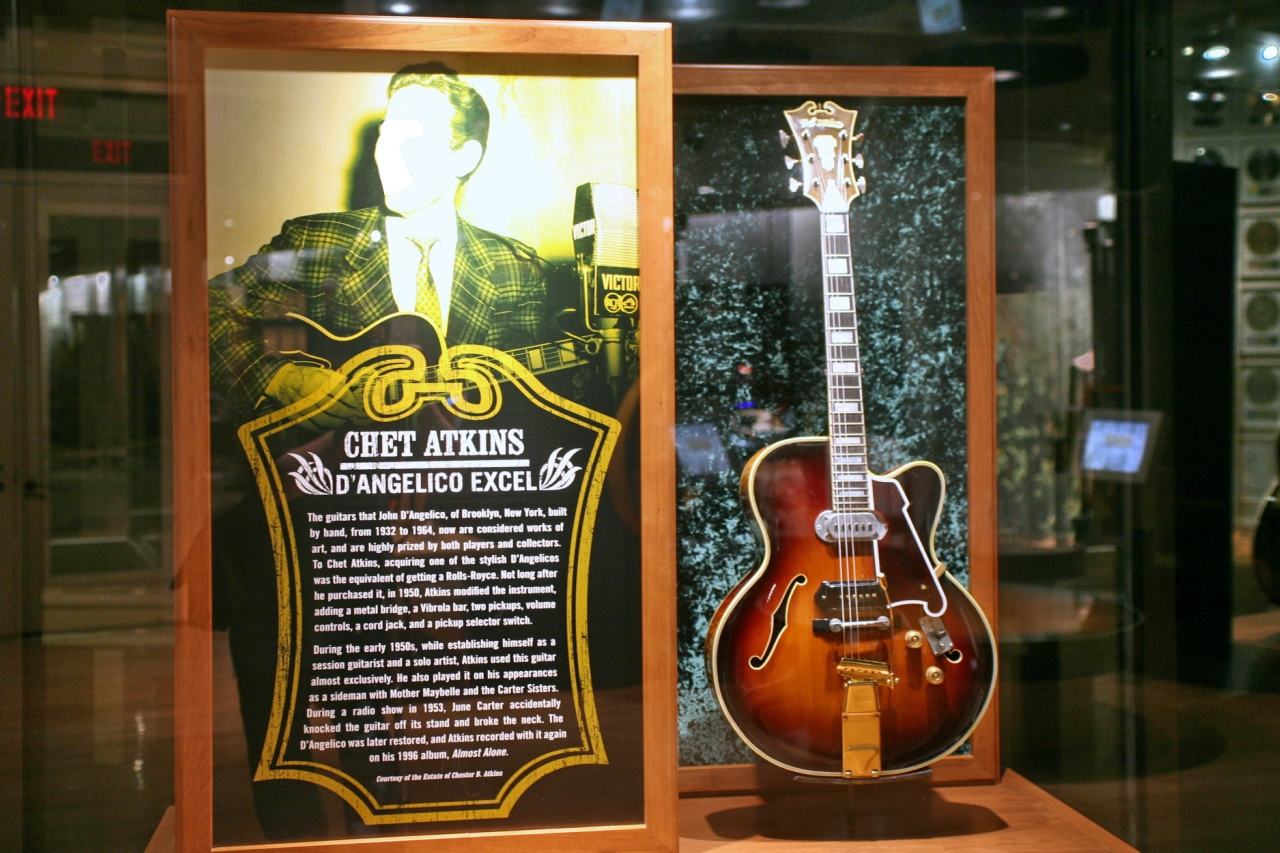
D'Angelico Excel (1950) previously owned by Chet Atkins, in the Country Music Hall of Fame, 2007

As John D'Angelico's early experiences with instrument making were studying the construction of violins, his first guitars followed their bracing design. The first D'Angelicos also had no pickups. They were built largely to be sturdy and loud enough to be heard in the context of a jazz big band. After years of unreliable bookkeeping and documentation of his early models, D'Angelico introduced the "Excel" model, a smaller, more streamlined iteration of its predecessors.

By 1937, D'Angelico was offering at least four main f-hole archtop guitar designs, heavily influenced by the Gibson L-5:

- Style A – 17 inch (430 mm) body. Phased out in the 1940s.
- Style B – 17 inch (430 mm) body. This had a more ornate body compared with the Style A. Phased out in the 1940s.
- Excel – 17 inch archtop body with a single Venetian cutaway. The back and sides were made of European maple while the top was made of spruce and the neck was made of solid flame maple. The fingerboard was made of ebony. It also featured "X" bracing and a truss rod. Later, pickups were added to the design, notably the D'Armond floating pickup which allowed for lighter body construction, as heft was no longer the only variable affecting volume. The Excel was popular with jazz musicians and was used by Chet Atkins prior to his sponsorship deal with Gretsch in 1936.
- New Yorker – 18 inch body. The back and sides were made of European maple while the top was made of spruce. The fingerboard was made of ebony. First produced in 1936. All New Yorker models featured pearl inlays in the headstock and fingerboards, as well as quadruple bindings. Approximately 300 were made.

Through at least the late 1930s, D'Angelico's guitar necks had non-adjustable steel reinforcement. Later models had functional truss rods. By the late 40s, D'Angelico was building only the "Excel" and "New Yorker" models.

D'Angelico also built a few round-hole (as opposed to f-hole) archtops, and a few mandolins. All of D'Angelico's instruments were hand-built, with most tailored specifically to the artist/player he was building for, so substantial variation is evident in his output. D'Angelico's shop rarely made more than 30 guitars per year. By the time of John D'Angelico's death the company had built 1,164 numbered guitars with the last ten finished by D'Aquisto.

=== Present days ===
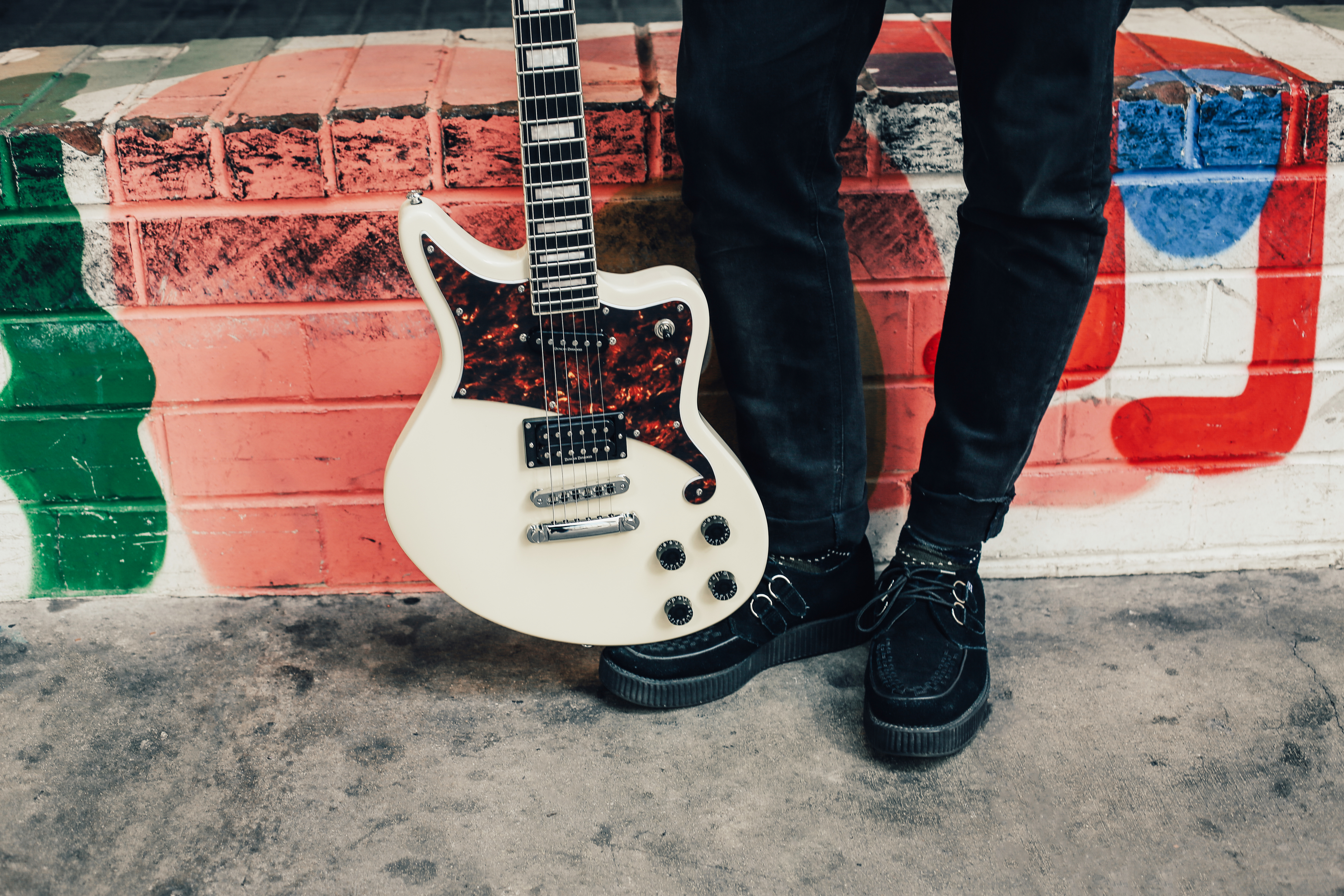
Bedford model pictured in 2018

Since its resurgence, D'Angelico has offered the DC, a double cutaway semihollow, the single-cutaway semihollow SS, and the archtop EXL-1, the last based on John D'Angelico's Excel model. The SS has been endorsed by artists such as Grateful Dead's Bob Weir and jazz guitarist Kurt Rosenwinkel, both of whom have a signature D'Angelico model. The DH and 175 were introduced as archtop options featuring double humbuckers, while the 59 features P-90 pickups. The Premier Series was introduced to offer well-crafted D'Angelico guitars at a more accessible price point, while the Deluxe Series houses feature-heavy versions of Excel Series favorites. The Deluxe Series features all unique matte finishes, and models with double-humbuckers come with a six-way toggle switch for coil-tapping capabilities.

In 2016, D'Angelico launched its first strings for electric guitars since its reformation. In a collaboration with D'Addario, Electrozinc strings were developed based on an original design from the two companies' founders—John D'Angelico and John D'Addario. Electrozinc is a zinc-coated steel string built for loudness and longevity.

== Manufacture ==
The brand's instruments are manufactured in South Korea, Indonesia, China, and New York City. Before beginning manufacturing, original guitar models were put through an MRI machine and an x-ray to replicate the instruments accurately. It takes approximately 18 months to two years to create one of their master-builder guitars from raw wood. D'Angelico Guitars' luthiers produce four to five master-builder guitars a month.

== Artists ==
Among the artists who play, or have played D'Angelico guitars on stage are:

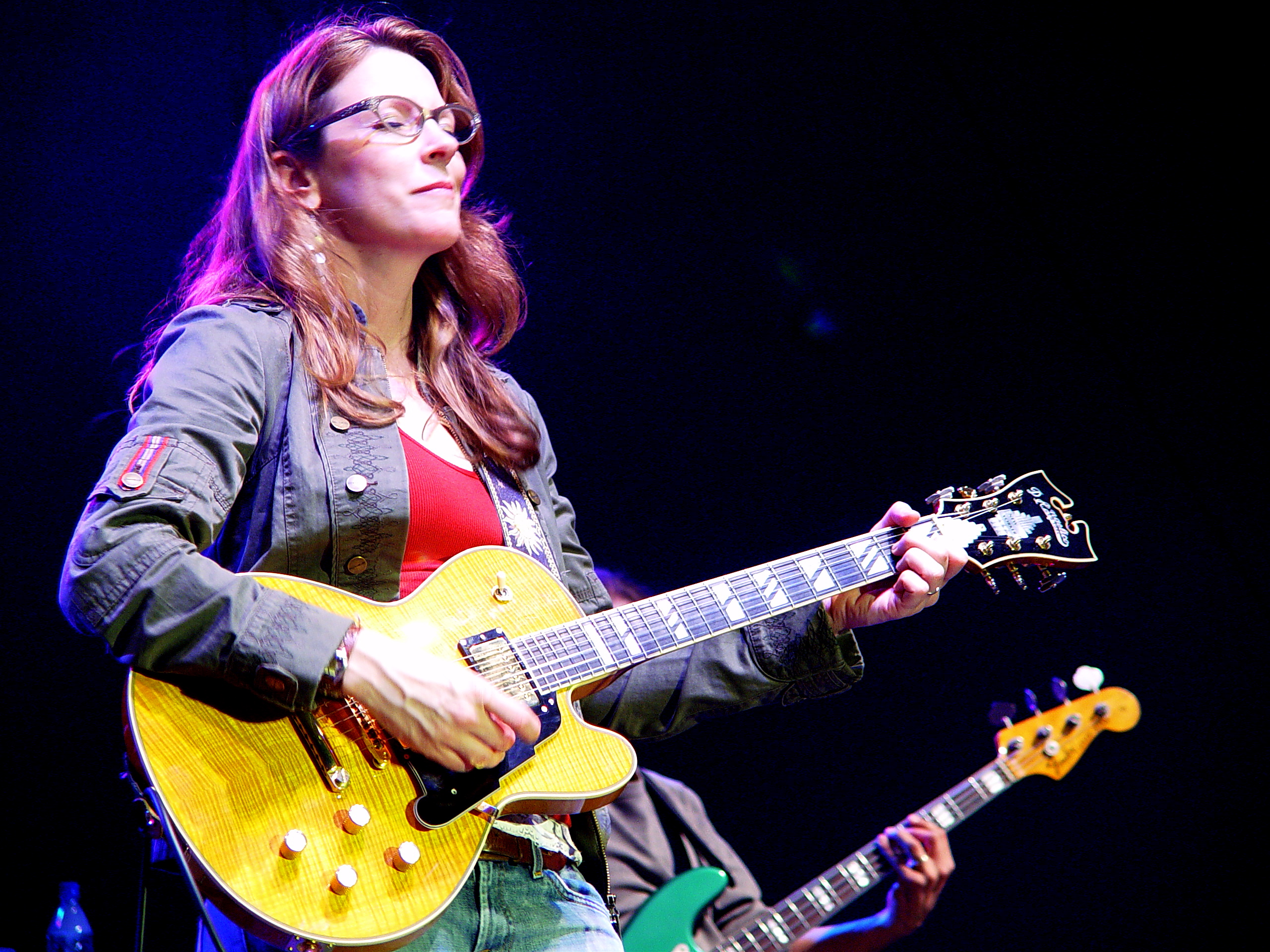
Susan Tedeschi playing her D'Angelico NYSD-9 in concert, 2007

- Chris Arndt (Jocelyn & Chris Arndt)
- Chet Atkins
- Chester Bennington
- Jonathan Butler
- Eric Clapton (Note: In 2014 he requested a customized version of the D'Angelico Style B for touring.)
- Dario Chiazzolino
- Drake Bell
- Nate Kemner
- Nels Cline
- Bootsy Collins
- Doug Deming
- Elliot Easton
- Michael Franti
- Alejandro Rose Garcia (Shakey Graves)
- Steve Gibson
- Warren Haynes
- Kenny Loggins
- Oscar Moore (Note: He used a D'Angelico on many of his recordings in the 1940s.)
- Brandon Niederauer
- Poppy
- Luke Pritchard (The Kooks)
- David Rawlings
- Kurt Rosenwinkel
- Cody Simpson
- Susan Tedeschi
- Bob Weir (Grateful Dead)
- Brad Whitford
- George Benson

== See also ==
- John D'Angelico
