= Gina Sicilia =

American singer-songwriter (born 1985)

- Born: Elvira Gina Sicilia; March 6, 1985 (age 41); Newtown, Pennsylvania, U.S.
- Occupations: Musician; Singer; Songwriter
- Years active: 2005–present
- Musical career
- Genres: Blues; Roots; Americana; Soul; R&B
- Instruments: Vocals; Guitar
- Labels: VizzTone Label Group; Blue Élan
- Website: www.ginasicilia.com

Elvira Gina Sicilia (born March 6, 1985) is an American singer, songwriter, and musician. Her album, Heard the Lie, peaked in the Top 10 on Billboard charts blues music charts in September, 2018 as well as Sunset Avenue peaking at No. 15 in September, 2016. She was nominated for a Blues Music Award for Best New Artist in 2008 and has shared the stage with such artists as Beth Hart, Joan Osborne, Kenny Wayne Shepherd, Joe Bonamassa, Shemekia Copeland, and Johnny Winter amongst others.

== Early life ==
Sicilia was born in Newtown, Pennsylvania, a suburb of Philadelphia, United States, to parents Giovanni Sicilia, an Italian immigrant, born in the southern Italian regione of Calabria who emigrated to the United States in the 1960s, and Patricia Sicilia, born in Philadelphia. She is fluent in Italian and English. Sicilia attended the Council Rock School District in Bucks County, Pennsylvania.

Sicilia began singing at 6 years old performing at local talent shows and by the age of 12 she began writing songs. At 14 years old she became interested in blues and classic soul music and decided to pursue singing in that genre. During her sophomore year of college, Sicilia began attending the weekly blues jam at Warmdaddy's in Philadelphia. It was there she got her first performing experience and met a large group of local musicians who would help her to record her first demo. In 2007 she recorded and released her debut album, Allow Me To Confess which was posted on her myspace page which caught the attention of Richard Rosenblatt who was the president at the then-new record label, VizzTone Label Group, who signed her to the label.

== Albums ==
- 2007 - Allow Me To Confess

In 2006 Sicilia recorded her debut album, Allow Me To Confess, which was produced by Dave Gross and consisted of eight original songs. Musicians on the album included harmonica player Dennis Gruenling and Arthur Neilson. The album was released in early 2007 to received favorable reviews.

A few months after the album's release, Sicilia signed with the VizzTone Label Group. Sicilia was nominated for a 2008 Blues Music Award in the category of 'Best New Artist Debut'. She also performed at the ceremony alongside the blues pianist, David Maxwell.

- 2008 - Hey Sugar

In October 2008, Sicilia released her second album, Hey Sugar, which debuted at No. 10 on the Living Blues Radio chart and consisted of nine original compositions. Hey Sugar helped to further establish Sicilia as a formidable singer, songwriter, and performer who could easily cross over from Blues to Americana. Sicilia toured the United States extensively in 2008-2009 and in 2011, took part in the Legendary Rhythm and Blues Cruise. There, she performed alongside such artists as Kenny Wayne Shepherd, Joan Osborne, and The Holmes Brothers.

- 2011 - Can't Control Myself

On March 1, 2011, Sicilia released her third studio album, Can't Control Myself, once again produced by Dave Gross.

The album was met by rave reviews. The Boston Globe praised her voice as "Earthy and voluptuous" while About.com said she "delivers a vocal and lyrical performance that rates alongside the titans of early-1960s soul." In March 2011, to promote the new album, Sicilia performed on Philadelphia's NBC "10! Show" and interviewed and performed on BB King's Bluesville, channel 74 on Sirius/XM Radio with DJ Bill Wax. The album debuted at No. 11 on the Living Blues Radio Charts on April 1, 2011 and was added to over 150 AAA radio stations in May 2011. In the summer of 2011 Can't Control Myself was included in About.com's list of the "Top Ten Best Blues Album's of 2011...So Far".

- 2013 - It Wasn't Real

On April 30, 2013, Sicilia released her fourth studio album, It Wasn't Real, on the VizzTone label. The CD was produced and engineered by Grammy winning producer Glenn Barratt at Morning Star Studios in Amber, Pennsylvania. The recording contained an array of Philadelphia studio musicians and included nine of Sicilia's original songs, as well as an early 1960s Etta James hit, "Don't Cry Baby"

- 2014 - The Alabama Sessions

In 2014 Sicilia traveled to Muscle Shoals, Alabama where she recorded and produced her fifth studio album of all original material, The Alabama Sessions, a 5-song EP. The album was recorded at The NuttHouse Studio and the project was overseen by studio owner Jimmy Nutt. It was released during the summer of 2014 by the VizzTone Label Group along with a music video for one of the album's five original songs, "I'm In Trouble"

- 2016 - Sunset Avenue

In August 2016 Sicilia released her sixth studio album on Blue Élan Records, located in Los Angeles, California. The five-song EP was met with international critical acclaim and received airplay across the United States, Canada, United Kingdom, Europe and Asia. The music zine Friday Blues Fix called Sicilia "One of the finest vocalists currently practicing in the Blues Field"

- 2017 - Tug of War

Tug of War was recorded in Philadelphia and Sicilia toured the US and Canada to promote the album and performed at SXSW in 2018.

- 2018 - Heard the Lie

Produced by Grammy nominated producer, Dave Darling in Los Angeles and featuring a duet with label-mate, Grammy nominated Janiva Magness. The album featured a cover of Bad Company's Ready For Love. She toured the US extensively also opening several shows for Paul Thorn. Heard the Lie debuted on the Billboard Blues music chart at No. 10.

== Awards and recognitions ==
- 2008 - Nominated - Blues Music Award - Best New Artist
- 2008 - Nominated - Blues Blast Music Award - Best New Artist Debut Recording
- 2011 - Nominated - Blues Blast Music Award - Sean Costello Rising Star
- 2017 - Winner - LA Music Critics Awards - Best Blues Artist

== Personal life ==
From 2005 to 2013, Sicilia was in a relationship with guitarist/producer Dave Gross. Gross is the owner of Fat Rabbit Studios located in New Jersey.

In 2013, Sicilia relocated from Newtown to Nashville, Tennessee.
