= Doug Deming & the Jewel Tones =

- Origin: Detroit, Michigan, United States
- Genre: Blues
- Years active: Early 1990s–present
- Label: Various
- Website: Official website

Doug Deming & the Jewel Tones is an American blues band. They have released four albums since 2002, with the most recent, Complicated Mess (2018), appearing in the US Billboard Blues Albums Chart.

Deming is influenced by the guitar playing of T-Bone Walker, Charlie Christian, Luther Tucker and Robert Lockwood Jr. From humble beginnings in the early 1990s, performing in the clubs of Detroit, Michigan, Deming and his band have toured and recorded with Kim Wilson, Lazy Lester, Gary Primich, Johnny "Yard Dog" Jones, A.C. Reed, and Alberta Adams.

== Career ==
The band's frontman, Doug Deming, was born in the east side of Detroit, Michigan, United States, in 1970, although he currently resides in the Gulf Coast of Florida.

At the age of 16, Deming drove from his then home in Detroit across Eight Mile Road, to the renovated Fox Theatre. There he witnessed a blues revue containing Denise LaSalle, Bobby Bland, B.B. King and Albert King. This experience led him towards traditional jump blues. Earlier that year, he purchased his first guitar and started trying to learn to play blues standards. By the early 1990s, he had graduated towards working part-time in music by appearing in local clubs. Deming noted that "Detroit had a handful of classic musicians who played for Fortune Records. For me, the environment was very welcoming and nurturing as a young blues player." In 1991, he called his backing unit the Blue Suit Band, before renaming them as the Jewel Tones. They became a notable attraction locally, both at their own gigs and when backing more well known acts.

Their debut album, Double Down (2002), had guest appearances by Chris Codish (organ), Denny Freeman (piano), Rick Holmstrom (guitar), and Greg "Fingers" Taylor (harmonica). They continued to perform regularly before landing a recording contract with Mighty Tiger Records, a nationally distributed record label. Their next album, Falling Through the Cracks, was also augmented by guests such as Kim Wilson and Bill Heid. The traditional approach to the music was maintained, incorporating Deming's guitar and vocals to supplement his own songwriting. Three cuts included Motor City Horns veterans Keith Kaminski (saxophone) and John Rutherford (trombone), plus Dwight Adams (trumpet). The track, "Only Time Will Tell", featured Bettye LaVette. Dennis Gruenling and Dave Morris supplied harmonica asides. AllMusic claimed "... this set of tunes that come across as ultimately pleasing, competent, and professionally played. They are the perfect band for any blues-chasing occasion".

However, changing local economic conditions, and the threat to privacy posed by the presence of a Burger King outlet next to their family home, saw Deming and his wife Claudia relocate to close to Tampa Bay, Florida.

Following Dennis Gruenling's contribution to the Falling Through the Cracks album, Deming's and Gruenling's musical careers began to intertwine. In 2008, Gruenling had recorded his album, I Just Keep Lovin' Him : A Tribute to Little Walter, and in touring to promote the collection, decided to use Doug Deming & the Jewel Tones as his backing ensemble. Gruenling's next album, Rockin' All Day (2012), featured Doug Deming & the Jewel Tones and in August that year, the combination toured the East Coast undertaking 28 shows in 26 days.

In 2012, What's It Gonna Take was issued by Doug Deming & the Jewel Tones via Vizztone Records. Their third recording spent several months in the Top Ten of the Living Blues Chart, and earned Deming the 2013 Blues Blast magazine, Sean Costello Rising Star Award. The album saw Gruenling again add his harmonica work and a joint tour supported the album's release.

Ready or Not (2016), became another collaborative recording for Gruenling featuring Doug Deming & the Jewel Tones.

Complicated Mess become the outfit's fourth album in their own name, and had ten Deming penned tracks. It also contained three cover versions; "You Rascal You", "I'm Walkin'" and a version of Lazy Lester's "Blues Stop Knocking". It was recorded with analog equipment in Hayward, California. Complicated Mess spent one week at No. 3 in the Billboard Blues Albums Chart in November 2018.

== Live performances ==
Dennis Gruenling featuring Doug Deming & the Jewel Tones played at the 2014 Bradenton Blues Festival. Deming and his own band also performed at the 2013 and 2018 events. In 2018, Doug Deming and the Jewel Tones played at the 23rd anniversary of the Western Maryland Blues Festival in Hagerstown, Maryland on June 1, followed by the High Cotton Music Hall Street Fest in Hartwell, Georgia, the next day.

In the latter half of 2018, the band undertook two month long tours around the Midwest and Eastern United States.

== Equipment ==
Deming prefers arch top guitars with P-90 pickups, and has utilised vintage Gibson and Kay electric guitars for most of his career. More recently he has been endorsed by D'Angelico Guitars and played their Excel 59 model. His use of solid body guitars, which comprise about one third of his live set, vary between a Fender Stratocaster or a Telecaster. His most recent choice for amplification have been Vero Amplifiers.

== Band ==
Over the years, the Jewel Tones have included the drummers Julian Van Slyke, Devin Neel, and acoustic bassist Bob Conner plus, more latterly, Andrew Gohman (upright and electric bass), Sam Farmer (drums) and Dave Cotton (saxophone).

== Discography ==
Year	Title	Record label
2002	Double Down	Chase Music Group
2009	Falling Through the Cracks	Mighty Tiger Records
2012	What's It Gonna Take	Vizztone Records
2018	Complicated Mess	Eller Soul Records
