= Kimley-Horn =

American consulting firm

Kimley-Horn and Associates, Inc.

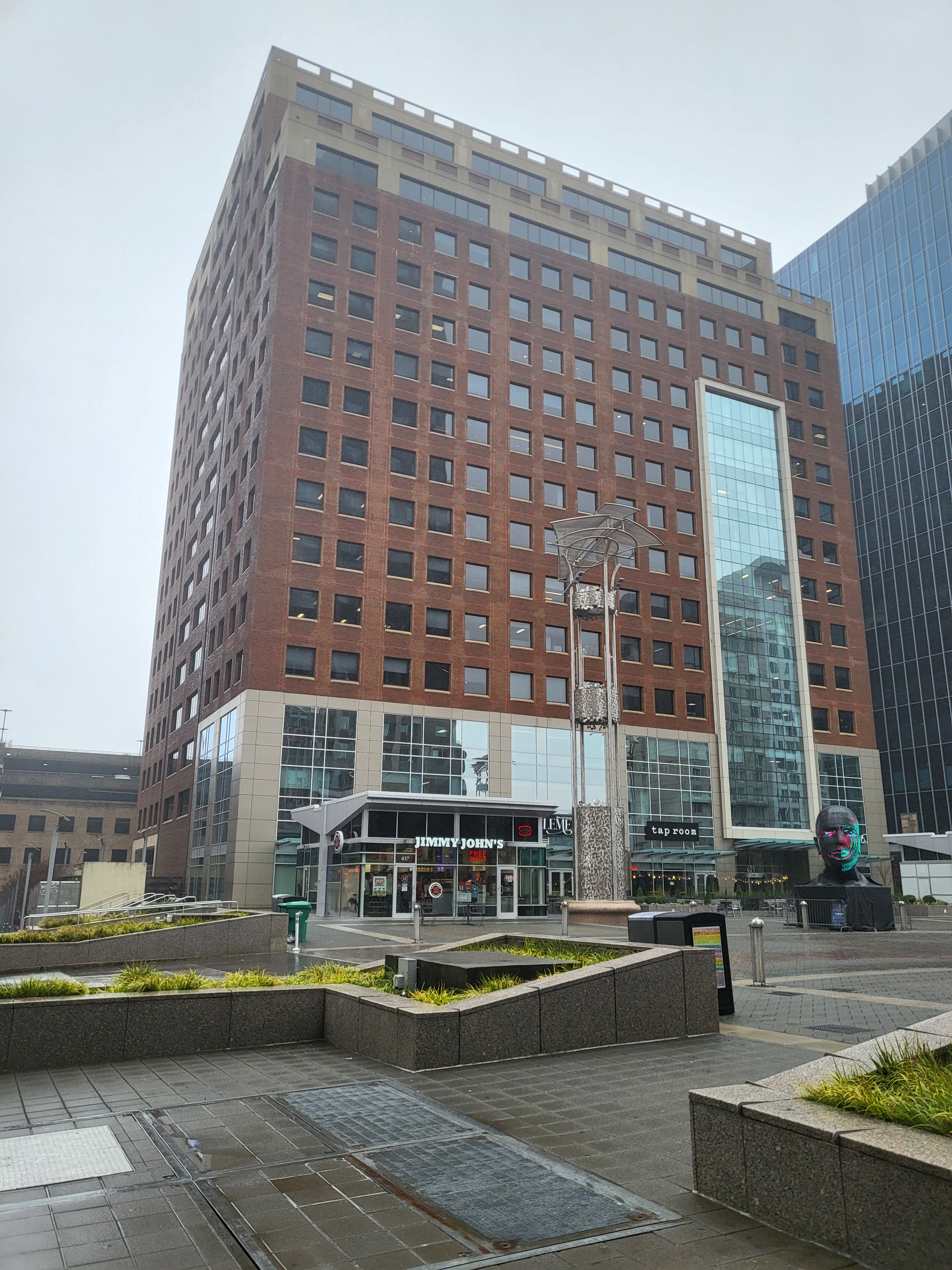
- Headquarters at the One City Plaza in Raleigh
- Type: Private
- Industry: Professional services
- Founded: February 1967 in Raleigh, North Carolina, United States
- Founders: Bob Kimley, Bill Horn, Ed Vick
- Headquarters: One City Plaza, Raleigh, North Carolina, United States
- Number of locations: 170+ (2026)
- Area served: United States
- Key people: Brent Mutti (President/CEO)
- Revenue: US$2.8 billion (2025)
- Number of employees: 10,000+ (2026)
- Website: www.kimley-horn.com

Kimley-Horn and Associates, Inc. is an American planning, surveying, engineering, and design consulting firm. The firm was founded in Raleigh, North Carolina, in 1967.

== Overview ==
Kimley-Horn was founded in Raleigh, North Carolina, in 1967 by three transportation engineers: Bob Kimley, Bill Horn, and Ed Vick. Kimley-Horn has more than 11,000 employees as of 2026.

== Awards ==
The company was ranked #22 on Fortune's "100 Best Companies to Work For" list in 2025, its 18th year on the list. Engineering News-Record ranked Kimley-Horn as #8 in its "Top 500 Design Firms" list in 2025, climbing two spots from the 2024 survey.

- #38 in Fortune Best Workplaces for Women 2024 (Large)
- #5 in Fortune Best Workplaces in Consulting & Professional Services 2022 (Large)
- #59 in PEOPLE Companies that Care, 2022
- #5 in Best Workplaces for Millennials 2024 (Large)
- #22 in Fortune 100 Best Companies to Work For 2025

== Services ==
Kimley-Horn provides a range of professional services including development services, roadway design, structural engineering, environmental engineering, surface water, transportation engineering, energy consulting, landscape architecture, aviation consulting, and software. The firm serves both public and private sector clients across the United States.

== Technology Solutions ==
Under Kimley-Horn Technology Solutions, Inc., the company develops and offers a suite of smart city and intelligent transportation system technologies, including the Kimley-Horn Integrated Transportation System (KITS), Traction Priority, and Kadence. These tools support adaptive signal control, transit signal priority, and real-time traffic performance monitoring.

The firm's software solutions are deployed in various municipalities across the United States and Canada, including Los Angeles County and Austin, Texas.
