= One Bank of America Plaza =

Coordinates: 35.7743°N 78.6387°W

One City Plaza
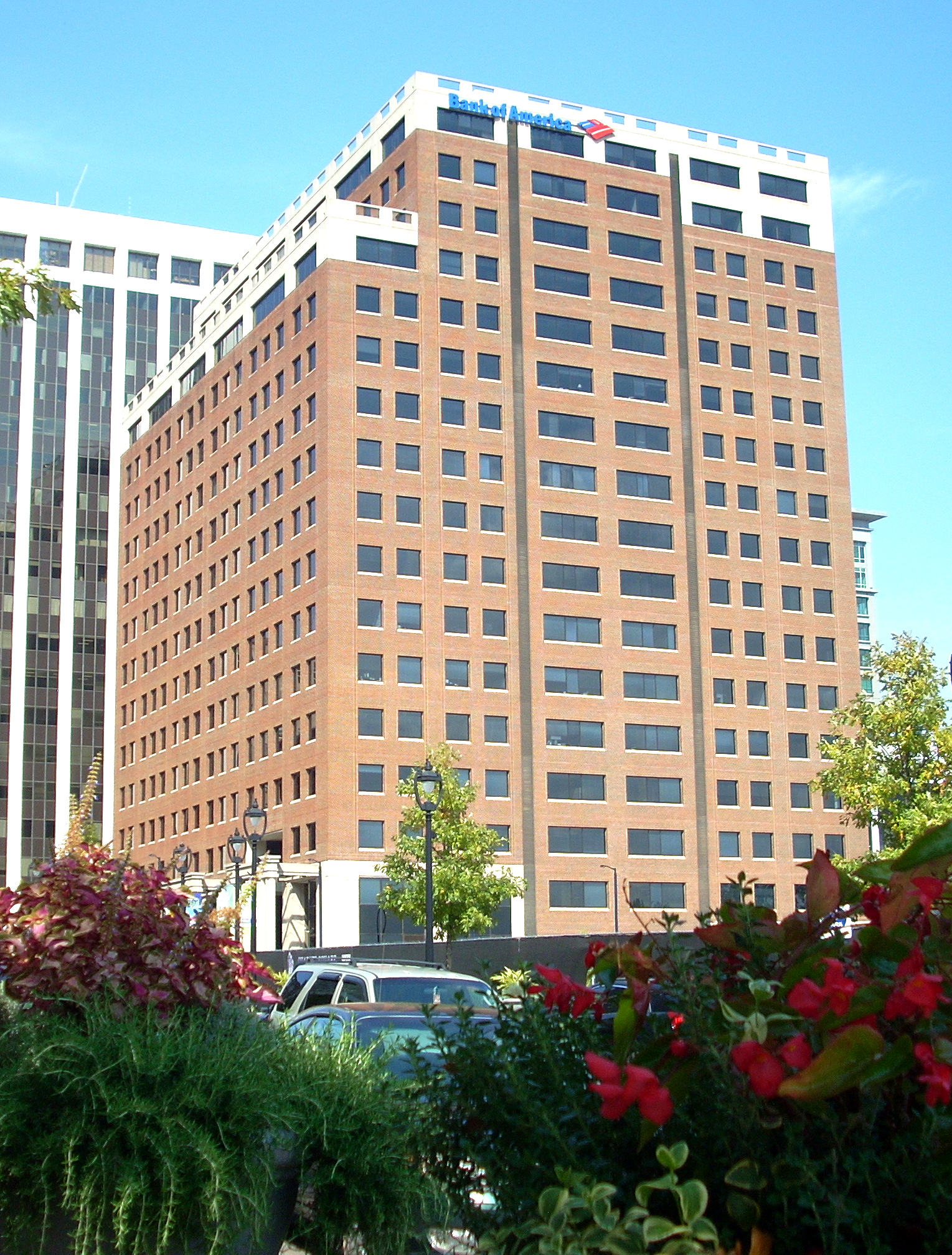
- Interactive map of the One City Plaza area

General information
- Status: Completed
- Location: Fayetteville Street; Raleigh, North Carolina, United States of America

Technical details
- Floor count: 17

Design and construction
- Structural engineer: LHC Structural Engineers

One City Plaza, formerly called One Bank of America Plaza, is a 17-story skyscraper located at 421 Fayetteville Street in Raleigh, North Carolina with 367,225 square feet (34,116.3 m^{2}).

== History ==
One Hannover Square and Two Hannover Square were completed in 1985.

Lennar Partners of Miami, Florida bought the building and its 554-space parking garage for $44.8 million in 2000.

One Hannover Plaza changed its name to One Bank of America Plaza in 2005 after Bank of America renewed its lease. Progress Energy had 155,000 square feet (14,400 m^{2}) but was moving into a new building of its own. Other major tenants included Absolute Collection Services with66,500 square feet (6,180 m^{2}), the City of Raleigh with 38,000 square feet (3,500 m^{2}), and the law firm Hunton & Williams.

In July 2005, The Simpson Organization of Atlanta, Georgia bought the building for $47.1 million. At the time, it had an occupancy rate of 80 percent. When the company listed the property for sale in 2010, it was 95 percent full. Simpson made improvements including a lobby redesign, a new fitness facility, additional conference space, and renovated retail space.
