= Favilla Guitars =

- Industry: Manufacturing
- Headquarters: New York City, New York, United States
- Products: guitars, mandolins, banjos, ukuleles,, violins

Favilla Guitars, Inc. was a family-run musical instrument company which produced quality string instruments for approximately 96 years until 1986. Originally called "Favilla Bros.", the company built guitars, mandolins, banjos, ukuleles, and violins.

== Company history ==
Brothers John (ca. 1871–1956) and Joseph Favilla, after having emigrated from Italy to New York City, formed Favilla Bros. (or Favilla Brothers, predecessor to Favilla Guitars, Inc.) either in 1890 or 1894. By the 1920s, the company had expanded to over 50 employees. The company produced instruments in various New York locations, but around 1930 settled into the West 16th Street location where it would remain until 1959. At that time, Hercules (“Herk”) Favilla, son of John Favilla and a former vaudeville performer, took over the business and renamed it Favilla Guitars, Inc. Herk's older brother Frank had been running administrative affairs for the company since the late 1940s. John Favilla died in 1956, and when his son Herk took over in 1959, the company was moved to a larger facility in Brooklyn.

In 1965 the company relocated again, this time to Long Island. Around this time, guitar production peaked at 3,000-3,500 per year. Herk's son Tom (b. 1942) worked for the company, and in 1970 began importing guitars from Japan under the Favilla name. (These instruments can be distinguished by their having the Favilla name in script on the guitar, instead of the full Favilla crest.)

Due to a shift in the guitar market from acoustic instruments to electric instruments, the Favilla company ceased production in 1973. However Herk and his son Tom continued building custom instruments until their retirements, in 1980 and 1986, respectively. They were often associated with the folk music revival of the 1960s. Artists like Bob Dylan and Pete Seeger, who were prominent figures in this movement, played Favilla guitars, contributing to the brand's popularity and association with folk music during that era.

== Instruments ==
Over almost a century, the Favilla family produced a wide range of instruments in America. Some of these bore names such as “Favilla Bros.”, “Favilla”, and “Marca Aquila.”

- Guitars (including classical, archtop, dreadnought including the 12-string F-12, and tenor)
- Mandolins (including “bowl back” and “flat back” models)
- Banjos
- Ukuleles (including “Teardrop” models, soprano, concert, tenor, baritone)
- Violins
- Other
  - Dulcet Guitarette
  - Wimbrola
  - Mandolin-banjo

== Publications ==
In the 1950s and 1960s Herk Favilla was involved with music publication as well. In 1951 he authored and published a two-volume baritone ukulele method, one volume for self-taught beginners, the other for students and professionals. He also published a collection of arranged guitar music in 1965.
