= Joe Filisko =

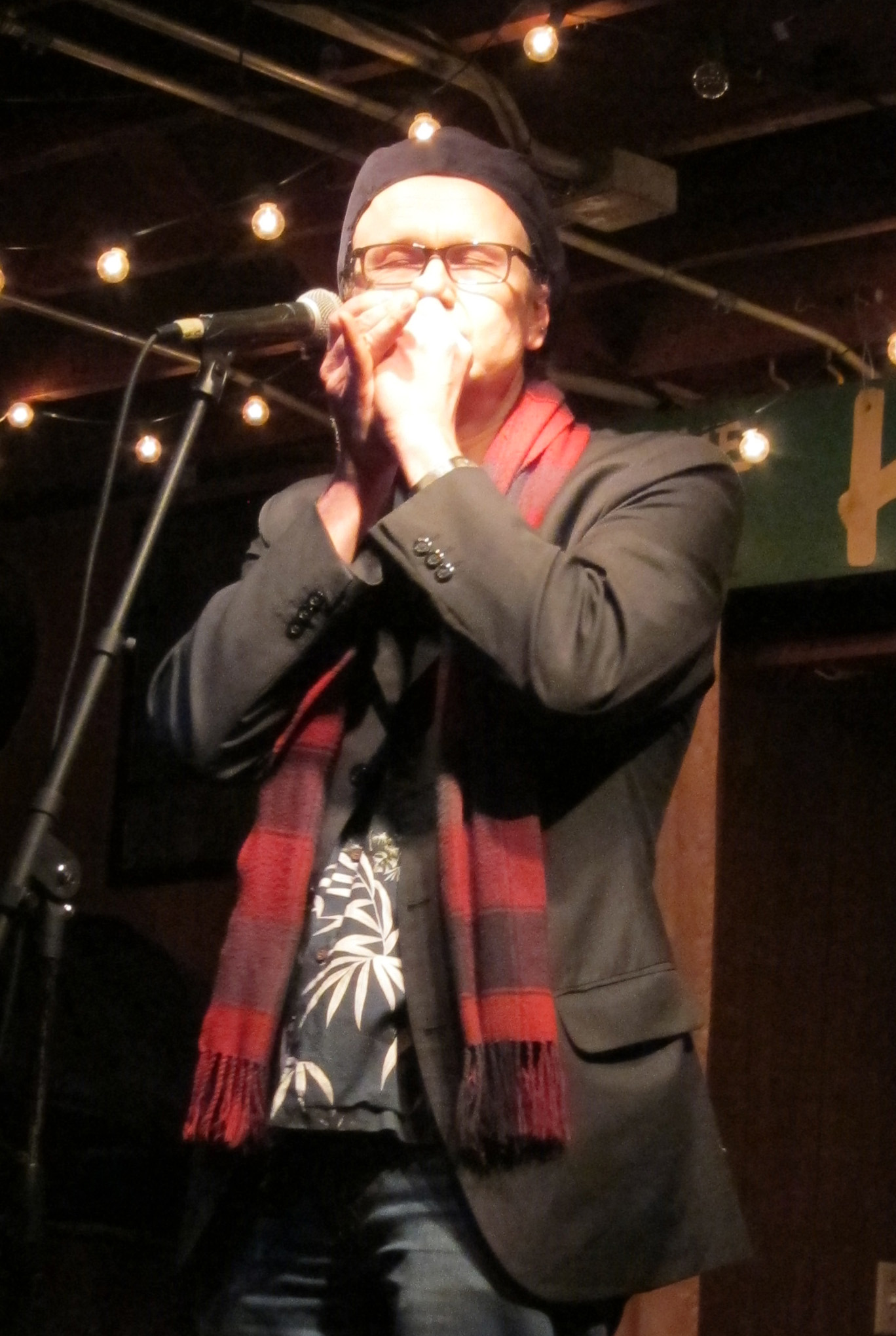
- Joe Filisko performing in 2013

Background information
- Born: Giessen, Germany
- Genres: Pre-war blues
- Occupation(s): Musician, harmonica customizer, music teacher
- Instrument: Harmonica
- Years active: 1990–present
- Website: Official website

Joe Filisko is an American blues harmonica player and maker of customized harmonicas based in Chicago, Illinois. In 2001 he was named "Harmonica Player of the Year" by the Society for the Preservation and Advancement of the Harmonica. In addition to performing, and building customized harmonicas, he also teaches at the Old Town School of Folk Music. The Hohner harmonica company describes him as the world's foremost authority on the diatonic harmonica. He designed the distinctive conical cover plates of the Hohner Marine Band Thunderbird harmonicas.
