= Realize Bradenton =

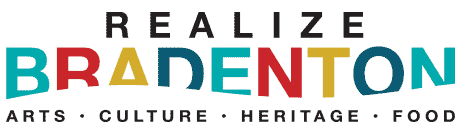
- Realize Bradenton logo
- Founded: November 2009
- Tax ID no.: 27-1330078
- Location: Bradenton, Florida
- CEO / Executive Director: Johnette Isham
- Staff: 5 (2019)
- Volunteers: 300 (2019)
- Website: realizebradenton.com

Realize Bradenton is a nonprofit organization in Bradenton, Florida responsible for implementing the Cultural Master Plan for downtown Bradenton. It was created in November 2009 with a mission to develop and promote downtown Bradenton by making it a unique and preferred cultural destination for residents and visitors.

== Background ==
The idea for an organization to undertake cultural planning was a key recommendation of the 2007 Downtown by Design planning process, an initiative sponsored by the Bradenton Culture and Business Alliance and the Knight Foundation. This initiative resulted in the Realize Bradenton Cultural Plan which was created from April 2008 through March 2009 and involved engaging over 1,500 community members in research and planning including interviews, focus groups, public forums and hearings, community surveys, economic impact studies, market research, cultural organization capacity assessment, and research into comparable cities and programs.

The nonprofit organization was created in 2009 to spearhead the execution of the Realize Bradenton initiative resulting from the study and planning phases of the project. In September 2009, former Ringling College of Art and Design Vice President, Johnette Isham, was named Executive Director of the group, and in November Realize Bradenton Inc. achieved its formal nonprofit status. Its newly appointed board of directors, chaired by Vernon DeSear, approved the organization’s mission to work on behalf of downtown cultural development.

== Mission and role ==
The organization's stated mission is "Develop and promote downtown Bradenton by making it a unique and preferred cultural destination for residents and visitors." This mission is based on leveraging the existing strengths of the downtown area:

- Current arts, culture, and heritage assets significantly contribute to the economy and quality of life.
- Physical assets of riverfront, historic downtown, and the Village of the Arts.
- Area residents value arts, culture, and heritage opportunities and consumer demand is growing.
- Leaders and citizens are proud of their city and want to collaborate.

To carry out this mission, Realize Bradenton acts as a connector between and among its cultural partners in downtown, its sponsors and corporate partners, and the city in the form of the Bradenton Downtown Development Agency. The DDA carries out the role of place-making in Bradenton, whereas Realize Bradenton subsequently fills the role of place-branding. The inter-connectivity of the two groups goes beyond financial considerations. Vernon DeSear, a member of the DDA board, is also chairman of the Realize Bradenton board.

== Senior Staff ==
- Johnette Isham – Chief Executive Officer / Executive Director
- Brian Craft – Marketing Director
- Holly Eisemann – Events and Creative Services Manager
- Catherine Ferrer – Community Engagement Coordinator
- Joanna Bailey – Support Specialist

== Accomplishments ==
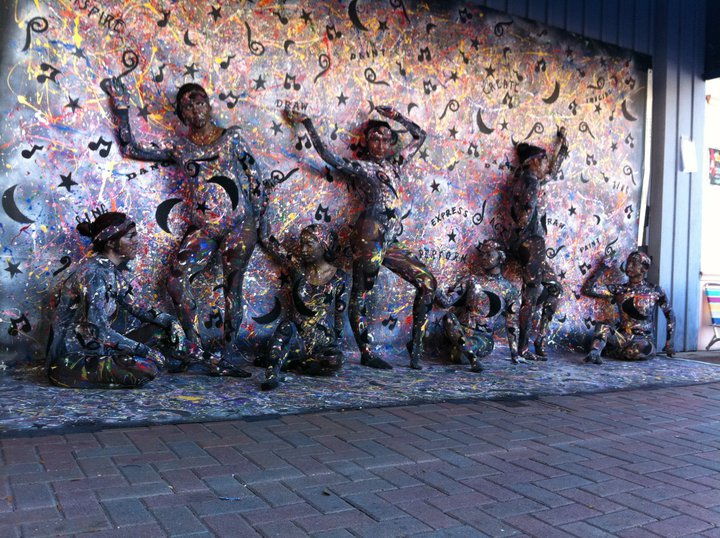
The winning creative team from the ArtSlam 2010 event by Realize Bradenton

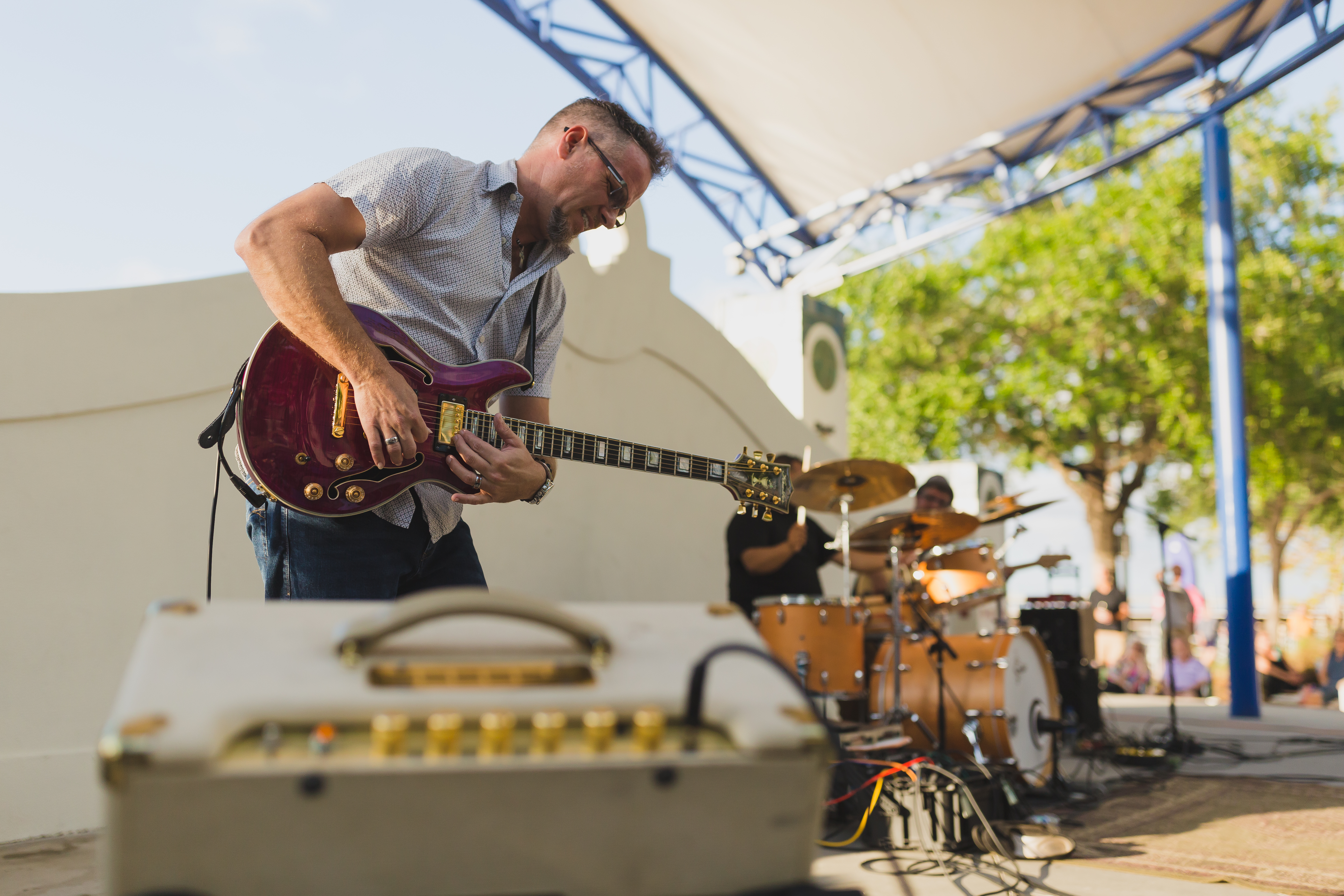
Realize Bradenton's Music in the Park

Realize Bradenton's promotion of downtown happenings has not only led to increased attendance, but also lured new promoters and events to the area including American Craft Endeavors’ popular premiere art fair (previously an annual event in downtown Sarasota, St. Armands Circle and Siesta Key for more than 20 years) which debuted in downtown Bradenton in February 2010.

In the spring of 2011, Realize Bradenton won a sizable grant from the Knight Foundation to fund Project Art Connects, a collaboration of top students from local high schools, undergraduates from [New College] and [Ringling College of Art and Design], art and history teachers, local historians, environmental specialists and visiting artists. By utilizing elements of art and social media, the three-year project is meant to form a bridge that connects the community’s past with its present and future through a series of civic, historical and cultural exercises.

In September 2012, Realize Bradenton created the "Downtown Ambassadors" program, consisting of volunteers who guide and inform visitors about the city's Riverwalk, McKechnie Field, Village of the Arts and other attractions. The program boasts more than 100 volunteers who assist with events and the promotion of the downtown area.

== Awards ==
Realize Bradenton received Tampa Bay Regional Planning Council’s Future of the Region Award on April 26, 2019 alongside The City of Bradenton. The award recognizes the collaboration between the two entities for the Creating Together Project, a community outreach effort to ignite community participation in the planning and design of the Bradenton Riverwalk eastward expansion. The Riverwalk expansion is a new segment of the popular park that currently spans 1.5 miles (2.4 km) along the riverfront in downtown Bradenton.

Realize Bradenton was recognized with the American Planning Association's "Outstanding Public Interest Group of the Year" award for their efforts to improve the vitality, prosperity and success of the Bradenton community. At the time, Kathie Ebaugh, principal planner for Lee County Department of Community Development, was quoted as saying "Realize Bradenton is the kind of community development organization that we all wish we had in our communities. It supports the efforts of the city's planning department by engaging the residents, business people, and visitors in community planning activities and public events. In doing so, Realize Bradenton improves the quality of life and livability of the city for all."

Realize Bradenton was recognized with the Tampa Bay Business Journal's "2014 Public & Societal Benefit Nonprofit of the Year" award on June 5, 2014. The award recognizes Tampa Bay-based 501(c)(3), non-foundation community organizations benefiting residents of Greater Tampa Bay who are fiscally responsible and accountable with regard to program outcomes.

== ArtSlam ==
In October 2010 Realize Bradenton produced the ArtSlam event as part of the Festival sARTée — a fringe festival complementing the Ringling International Arts Festival. Thousands attended the public arts festival along the city's Old Main Street as various creative teams of artists and performers competed for the public's votes while completing art installations or performing throughout the daylong event. The Bradenton Herald characterized ArtSlam as "a wildly successful event, brought about by Realize Bradenton."

The event was so successful that it has become an annual event in Bradenton with progressively larger festivals held in October 2011 and 2012. With the addition of the Bradenton Blues Festival to the Realize Bradenton event schedule in 2012, the 2013 ArtSlam was pushed back to the spring of 2014 so that the festivals will be more evenly spaced with ArtSlam in the spring and the Blues Festival in the fall. The 2014 ArtSlam was held on March 8, 2014 with record attendance.

== Bradenton Blues Festival ==
In December 2012, Realize Bradenton produced the inaugural Bradenton Blues Festival featuring a lineup for national and regional blues artists performing at the city's new Riverwalk park which opening in October 2012. "Harry Potter" book series illustrator Mary GrandPré produced an iconic soft-geometry style poster for the event, the proceeds of which went to support local children's music programs. The festival attracted a sold-out crowd of over 3000, and the event has become an annual attraction in Bradenton.

== Riverwalk ==
One of the causes championed by Realize Bradenton (and the city's Downtown Development Authority) which came to fruition in 2012 was Bradenton Riverwalk. The Riverwalk is a one-and-a-half mile long park on the south bank of the Manatee River bordering downtown Bradenton. It consists of a skate park, day-dock, botanical walk, pavilion, great lawn, splash park & playground, and amphitheatre which opened on October 18, 2012. It serves as a public space as well as a venue for the Blues Festival and other events throughout the year. The attraction was created by renovating existing park space along the riverfront at a cost of $6.2 million in both public and private partner funds.
