= Manatee Mineral Springs Park =

- Indian Springs Park
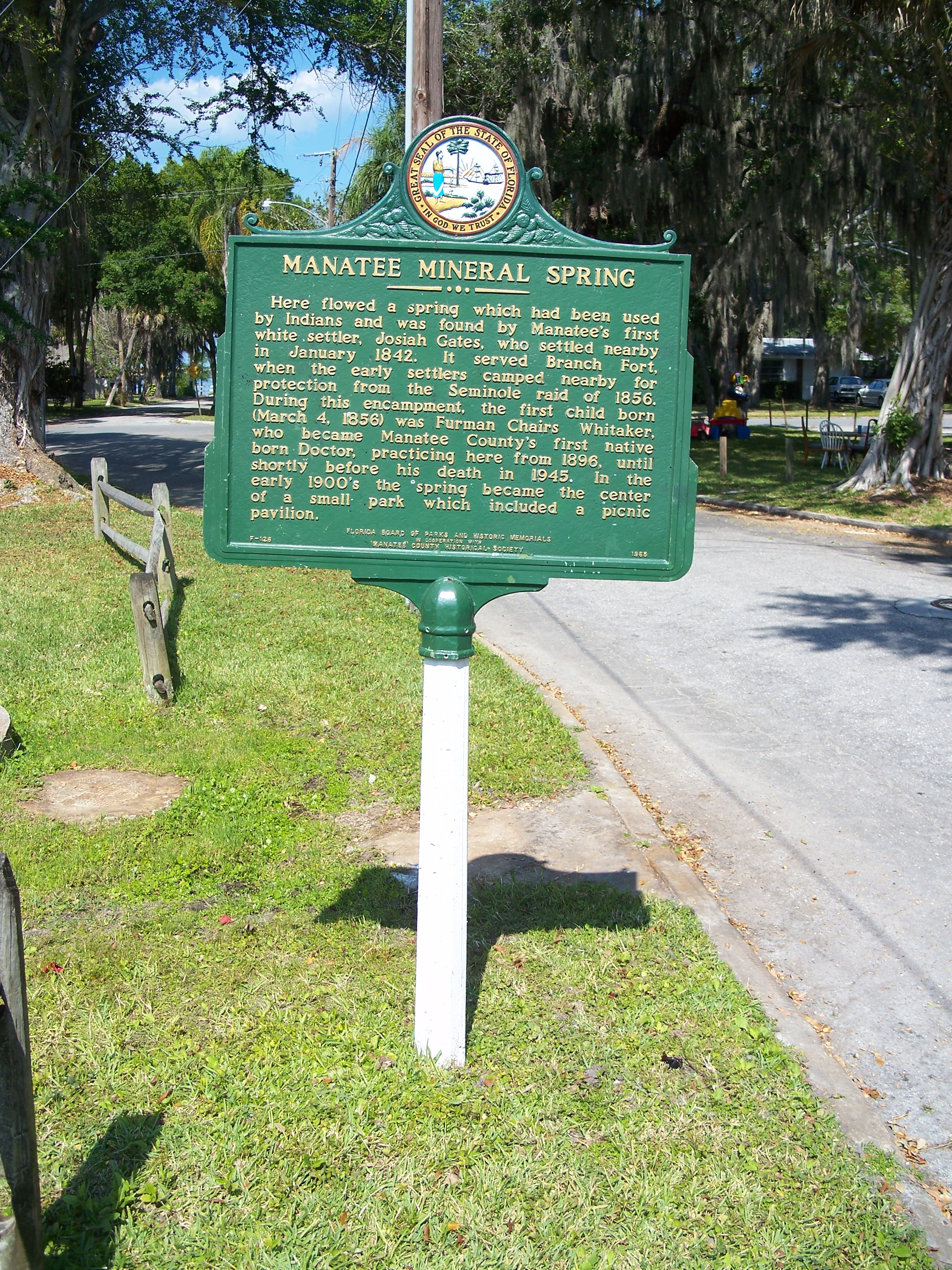
- Historical marker located in the park

- Location within Manatee County
- Location: Bradenton, Florida
- Coordinates: 27°29′51.41″N 82°32′57.04″W
- Area: 1.96 acres (0.0079 km^{2})
- Created: January 1842
- Operator: Bradenton
- Open: Year round

Manatee Mineral Springs Park (formerly Indian Springs Park) is a neighborhood park located in Bradenton, Florida. The park is named after a natural spring at the location. In 2006, the park's natural spring was designated a "Florida Natural Spring" by the Florida Geological Survey of Natural Springs.

The park is one of the region's oldest parks and a gateway to the city's Riverwalk eastern expansion.

== History ==
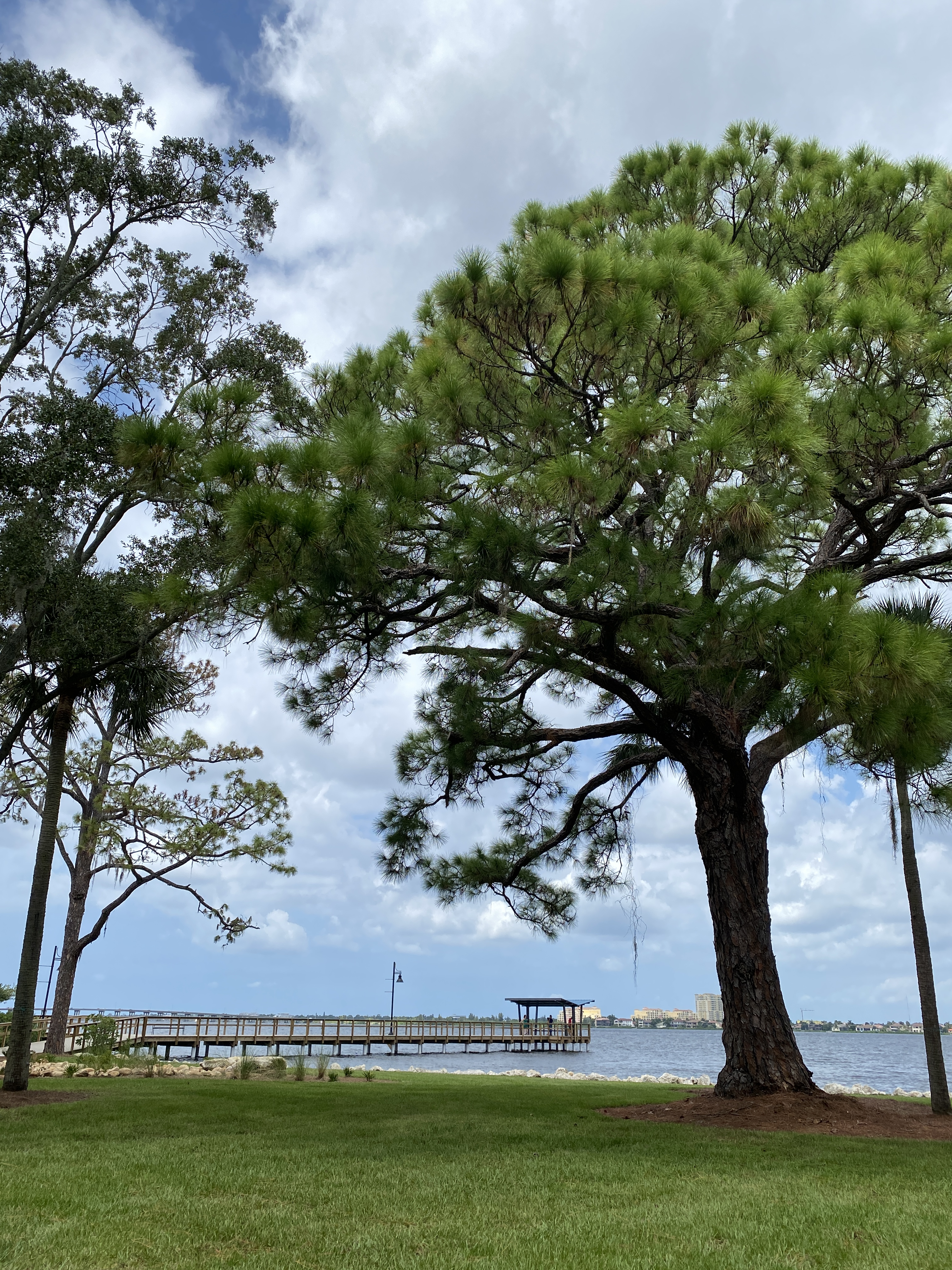
Riverwalk boardwalk at Manatee Mineral Spring Park

Paleo-Indians of Florida, likely part of the Safety Harbor culture, inhibited the area prior to contact with European explorers who first visited in the early 1500s. According to the book The Lures of the Manatee River by Lillian McDuffie described the spring site as having a pre-historic Indian village mound (midden). The midden was excavated by local amateur archeologist Montague Tallent, who donated many of the artifacts he discovered to the South Florida Museum, now known as the Bishop Museum of Science and Nature in Bradenton.

The park was designated in 2018 as a site on the Underground Railroad Network to Freedom, recognizing that the spring was used by individuals who had escaped slavery and lived near the spring between the end of the 1700s and when Florida became a territory in 1821. Maroon and Black Seminole settlements (see Angola) were destroyed by a massive slave raid in early 1821; some escaped to the Florida interior (see Minatti on Lake Hancock) or The Bahamas (see Nicolls Town).

A historical marker at the park commemorates the early Anglo-American settlement of the village of Manatee that grew up around the spring. Three Spanish fishermen who operated a fishing rancho in the area guided Josiah Gates, Manatee's first American settler, to this spot in late 1841. The Manatee River area was settled under the Armed Occupation Act of 1842 at the close of the Second Seminole War.

In 1842, Henry and Ellen Clark acquired the spring property and built the town's first trading post. Over many centuries, people who traveled, hunted, or settled along the nearby section of the Manatee River used water from the spring.

In January 2020, the city of Bradenton, funded excavations that recovered evidence of the early settlement of the area around the spring. Reflections of Manatee led that project and exhibited the artifacts that were recovered.

The park was re-landscaped and dedicated in 2022. A hand pump that pulls water from the spring onto a relief map of the Manatee River was added. The park has picnic tables and a small gazebo. A boardwalk extends into the Manatee River.

The park adjoins the Reflections of Manatee Historic Complex at the Curry Houses Historic District.
