= Jon Gindick =

American musician

Jon Gindick (born September 10, 1948, Hollywood, California, United States, died August 29, 2025) was an American best-selling musical instruction author. His books, CDs, and videos on playing the blues harmonica have sold over 2,000,000 copies. He put on 'Blues Harmonica Jam Camp,' a traveling seminar for harmonica players of all levels. Gindick was also a blues guitarist and singer.
