= Peter Karp (singer) =

- Born: Leonia, New Jersey, US
- Genres: Blues
- Occupations: Singer, songwriter, musician
- Instruments: Vocals, guitar, piano
- Years active: 1980s–present
- Labels: Back Bender Records, Blind Pig Records, fr:DixieFrog, Stony Plain Records
- Website: PeterKarp.com

Peter Karp is an American roots-based folk and blues singer, songwriter, guitarist, and pianist. He resides in Leiper's Fork, Tennessee, United States.

== Early life and career ==
Peter Karp was born in Leonia, New Jersey, United States, and lived in both New Jersey and Alabama during his childhood.

== Career ==
In 2003, Karp started recording an album; Mick Taylor, former guitarist for The Rolling Stones, recorded guitar tracks for the album and also toured with the band during that time and following the album's release in 2003 as The Turning Point on Back Bender Records. One of the stops on the tour was The Bottom Line in New York City, where Karp, Taylor and the Roadshow Band (Peter Karp on guitar, piano, vocals; Jim Ehinger on keyboards; Daniel Pagdon on bass; Dennis Gruenling on harmonica; Paul "Hernandez" Unsworth on drums; and Dave Keyes on piano on the song “Your Prettyness") performed a concert which was recorded for Sirius Satellite Radio.

Karp met Canadian musician Sue Foley while both were performing at Ottawa Bluesfest. They later began recording together, basing the lyrics of their songs on the content of e-mail letters they had exchanged in the meantime. Their first album He Said She Said, was released on Blind Pig Records in 2010, and also on fr:DixieFrog (France) and Stony Plain Records (Canada). The album peaked at No. 10 on the Billboard Blues Album chart. Their second release on Blind Pig Records, Beyond The Crossroads, came out in April 2012. The album was also released by Stony Plain Records (Canada). The pair toured in the US in support of the albums.

Ten tracks from the 2003 recording at The Bottom Line were released in 2016 as the album The Arson's Match. Profits from the album are donated to the Ovarian Cancer Research Foundation, in memory of Karp’s late wife, Mary Lou Bonney Karp. It was made available as part of a two-album set Live for Hope, along with Sue Foley’s Change, downloadable from OCRF’s website in exchange for a donation.
