= Bradenton, Florida =

City in Florida, United States

- City
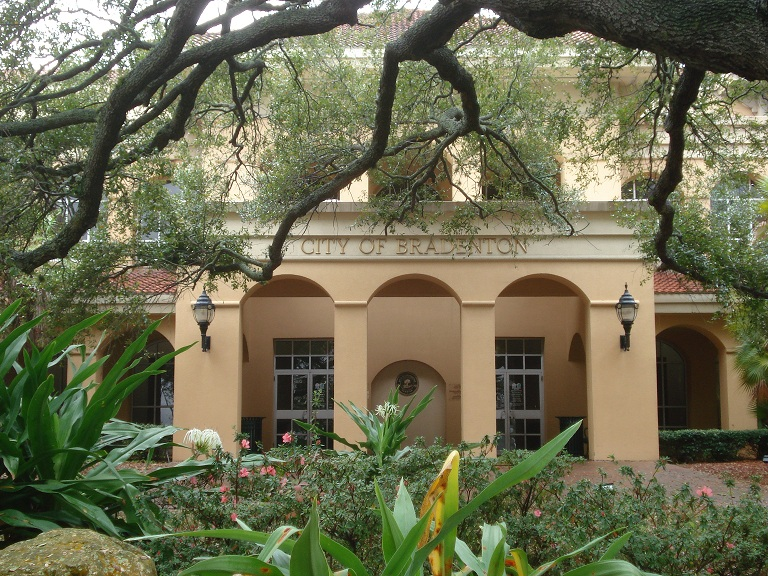
- Bradenton City Hall

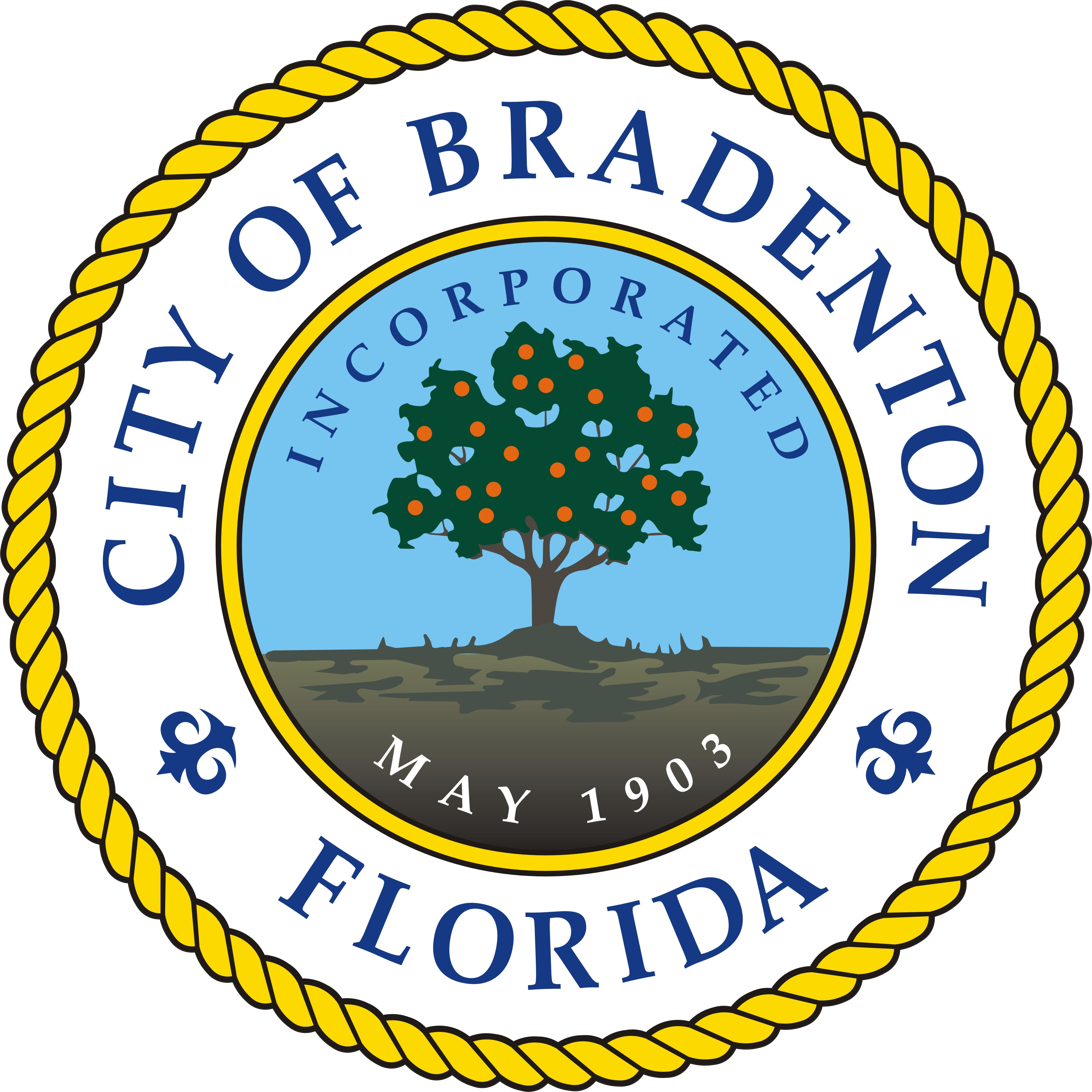
- Seal Logo
- Motto: "The Friendly City"
- Interactive map of Bradenton, Florida
- Location within Florida Location within the United States
- Coordinates: 27°29′46″N 82°34′38″W
- Country: United States
- State: Florida
- County: Manatee
- Settled: January 1842
- Incorporated (city): May 19, 1903
- Former names: Braidentown (1842–1905); Bradentown (1905–1924)

Government
  - Type: Mayor–Council
  - Mayor: Gene Brown
  - Vice Mayor: Marianne Barnebey
  - Councilors: Jayne Kocher, Josh Cramer, Lisa Gonzalez Moore, and Pam Coachman
  - City Administrator: Rob Perry
  - City Clerk: Tamara Melton

Area
  - City: 17.50 sq mi (45.32 km^{2})
  - Land: 14.34 sq mi (37.13 km^{2})
  - Water: 3.16 sq mi (8.19 km^{2}) 16.14%
- Elevation: 16 ft (4.9 m)

Population (2020)
  - City: 55,698
  - Density: 3,885/sq mi (1,500/km^{2})
  - Urban: 779,075 (US: 57th)
  - Urban density: 1,930/sq mi (744/km^{2})
  - Metro: 859,760 (US: 70th)
- Time zone: UTC-5:00 (EST)
  - Summer (DST): UTC-4:00 (EDT)
- ZIP Codes: 34201–34212, 34280–34282
- Area code: 941
- FIPS code: 12-07950
- GNIS feature ID: 2403907
- Website: cityofbradenton.com

Bradenton (/ˈbreɪdəntən/ BRAY-dən-tən) is a city in and the county seat of Manatee County, Florida, United States. Its population was 55,698 at the 2020 census. It is a principal city in the Sarasota metropolitan area.

Downtown Bradenton is along the Manatee River and includes the Bradenton Riverwalk and Bishop Museum of Science and Nature. To the south of Bradenton is Sarasota; beach communities on Anna Maria Island are to its west, and the Manatee River and Palmetto are to its north.

== History ==
=== Late 18th and early 19th centuries ===
A settlement established by Maroons or escaped slaves named Angola existed in Bradenton's present area starting in the late 1700s and ending in 1821. It is believed to have been spread out between the Manatee River (then known as Oyster River) all the way to Sarasota Bay. The community is estimated to have had 600–750 residents. Angola was a rather large Maroon settlement as the Manatee River at that time was too shallow for US Navy vessels to navigate. The settlement was abandoned after the Creeks, who were aligned with Andrew Jackson, attacked Angola.

When the United States annexed Florida in 1821, two known claimants of land were in the vicinity of Bradenton, but neither of them was confirmed by the US federal government.

=== Mid- and late 19th century ===
Josiah Gates moved with his family and eight slaves to the present-day Bradenton area in January 1842, after being attracted to the area for its natural beauty. Gates thought the area would be a popular place for new settlers to arrive at because it was near Fort Brooke, and they would need a place to stay temporarily while they were building their homes. He built an inn named Gates House, and his home near present-day 15th Street East. Gates is also credited as being the first known American settler in present-day Manatee County.

Bradenton is named after Dr. Joseph Braden, who relocated from Virginia and to Leon County in the new United States territory of Florida shortly after its annexation by the Adams–Onís Treaty in 1821. There he brought his Virginia slaves and established a cotton plantation. His fort-like house was a refuge for early settlers during the Seminole Wars. Braden owned a 1,100-acre (450 ha) sugar plantation in the area. After having financial difficulties from the Panic of 1837, he tried to re-establish himself financially in Manatee County in 1843. To help with the shipment of sugar grown at the new plantation, he constructed a pier in present-day downtown Bradenton. At its base he constructed a stockade home known as Fort Braden. During the Third Seminole War, on April 6, 1856, it was attacked by several Seminole Indians, one of its few, albeit small, direct engagements. Braden was financially successful with his plantation, but ended up moving back to Leon County because of the Panic of 1857.

Major Alden Joseph Adams purchased 400 acres of land in 1876 between present-day Manatee Memorial Hospital and 9th Street East and built his home, the three-story concrete Villa Zanza, there in 1882. Alden was known for having many animals and a large amount of foliage at his home. At one point, he owned over 300,000 acres of land in Manatee County. Adams had served in the Union Army during the American Civil War. After the war, he joined the US Secret Service and later was a newspaper correspondent for the New York Herald. He reported from Paris during the Paris Commune. At one point, he was asked to look for Dr. David Livingstone, but declined and suggested that Henry Morton Stanley go instead. Adams died in 1915, and his home was bought in 1924 with the intent of remodeling it; the effort was left incomplete, and it was demolished sometime in the late 1920s.

William I. Turner bought seven acres from John Crews Pelot in 1877 and created a subdivision of what is now Bradenton. The land itself was platted by Axel Emil Broberg and contained 19 plots on both sides of what is now 12th Street West, along with a cross street now called 3rd Avenue. Turner sold the lots, building a store and a warehouse along with his own home.

The town was originally spelled "Braidentown" because of a spelling error when it applied for a post office on May 9, 1878. The first bridge across Wares Creek was built in 1886. The following year, Bradenton was designated the county seat after DeSoto County was formed from eastern Manatee County, as the then-county seat, Pine Level, was in the new county. A county courthouse was built in 1890 at Courthouse Square.

=== 20th century ===
==== First half of the 20th century ====
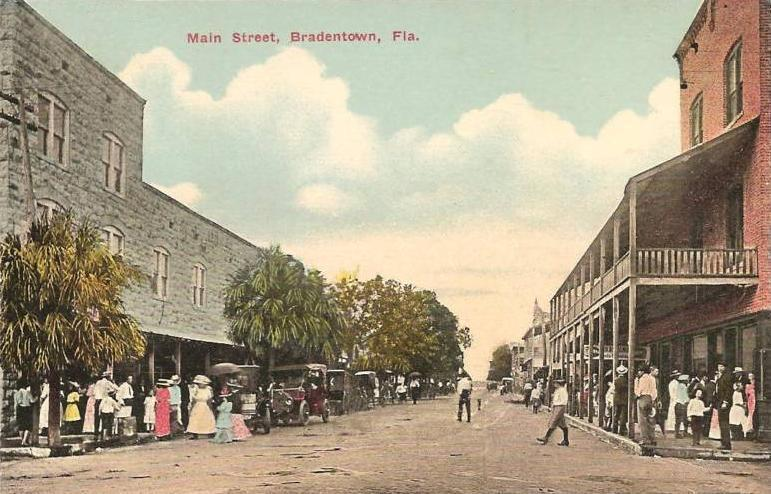
Old Main Street c. 1910

Railroad service was extended from Palmetto across the Manatee River to Bradenton in 1902. Bradenton was incorporated on May 19, 1903, with 59 voting in favor and 34 against it. Shortly after, a local election was held to choose the city's first elected municipal officials. A.T Cornwell was elected as mayor, Robert H. Roesch as clerk and tax assessor, A.B. Murphy as treasurer, and F. Dryman as tax collector, along with seven city council members. One of the earliest moves made by the municipal government was amending the name to "Bradentown". The name change was not reflected with the US Postal Service until 1905. On December 29, a streetcar line began operation going from Bradenton to the neighboring city of Manatee and went west crossing Wares Creek to the nearby community of Fogartyville. The company operating the line had financial difficulties, likely due to a lack of ridership, and cancelled the line in 1906. The Manavista Hotel was opened in January 1907 bordering the Manatee River on Main Street.

The Davis Bridge, the first general-traffic bridge across the Manatee River, was opened in June 1910. This wooden toll bridge, built by C.H. Davis, had one lane and passing spots. The bridge went from present-day 9th Street East (located within then nearby Manatee) to near where the Atwood Grapefruit Groves were located at west of Ellenton. In 1912, the first road, Range Road leading from present-day Bradenton (then Manatee) to Sarasota, was built. Also during that year, the original county courthouse was bought and moved to a new location, where it became Lincoln Academy Grammar School, a grade school for black students in the area. A new courthouse was built on the site of the old one in the following year, 1913, which still stands today. The Victory Bridge, opened in August 1919, runs from the current 10th Street West in Bradenton to 8th Avenue in Palmetto. Funding for the bridge came from bond issues by both Bradenton and Palmetto. The bridge itself had two lanes and was made of wood. Its name came from the United States' recent victory in World War I against the Central Powers. With the Victory Bridge's construction, the municipal government of Manatee attempted to buy Davis Bridge and make it public as a way to compete with Bradenton's Victory Bridge, but the deal never went through. The rest of the bridge ended up being dismantled with the exception of its draw section, which was sold to the county government and put into use for the Snead Island's Cutoff bridge in 1920.

==== 1920s and 1930s ====
Baseball spring training began in Bradenton with the construction of Ninth Street Park in 1923. The first team to train in the city was the St. Louis Cardinals, doing so in 1923 and 1924. The city council began the process of removing the letter "w" from its then-name, "Bradentown," in January 1925 and completed it on May 2, 1925, when the governor signed a bill making it official. All streets in the city were renamed in 1926 with a numbering system.

After the collapse of the Florida land boom and the onset of the Great Depression in late 1929, the city experienced an economic downturn. Along with an economic downturn, the city had financial issues as well with the city going into debt. During the Florida land boom, Bradenton borrowed money to pay for infrastructure in outlying areas. As a result, the city retracted its municipal boundaries so it could not provide services to those areas and defaulted on its municipal bonds as a result. After the municipal boundaries were redrawn, the bonds were refunded, and residents living within the new boundaries would be responsible for paying them. Bradenton eventually paid off its bonds. Despite the economic downturn, several new projects were done in the city. A municipal pier (referred to as Memorial Pier) was built in 1927 with a building at its end. The pier itself still stands and the building at its end has served a variety of functions ever since. As the Victory Bridge was deemed too unsafe to use after a hurricane hit it in 1926, the Green Bridge was built the following year in 1927 as a replacement to it. In the meantime, a ferry operated until the Green Bridge was built. On July 22, 1931, a joint committee was appointed by the municipal city councils of Bradenton, Manatee, and Palmetto to consider and possibly even merge the three cities, but nothing came out of the committee in the end. A new post office building was built in 1937 at 9th Street West and Manatee Avenue as a Works Progress Administration project. The post office is still in operation.

Compiled in the late 1930s and first published in 1939, the Florida guide listed Bradenton's population as being 5,986 and described it as:

lies opposite Palmetto on the south bank of the Manatee River. The two towns are connected by a mile-long bridge. Boom-time hotels dominate the skyline and do a thriving business in winter, when the population almost doubles. In the residential sections, comfortable houses are surrounded with aged trees. The neighboring area of rich muck land normally produces two or three crops each season, making Bradenton the principal shipping center for winter vegetables on the west coast. Celery, citrus fruits, tomatoes, cabbages, eggplants, green peppers, and square are the main products.

— Federal Writers' Project, "Part III: The Florida Loop", Florida: A Guide to the Southernmost State (1947)

==== 1940s ====
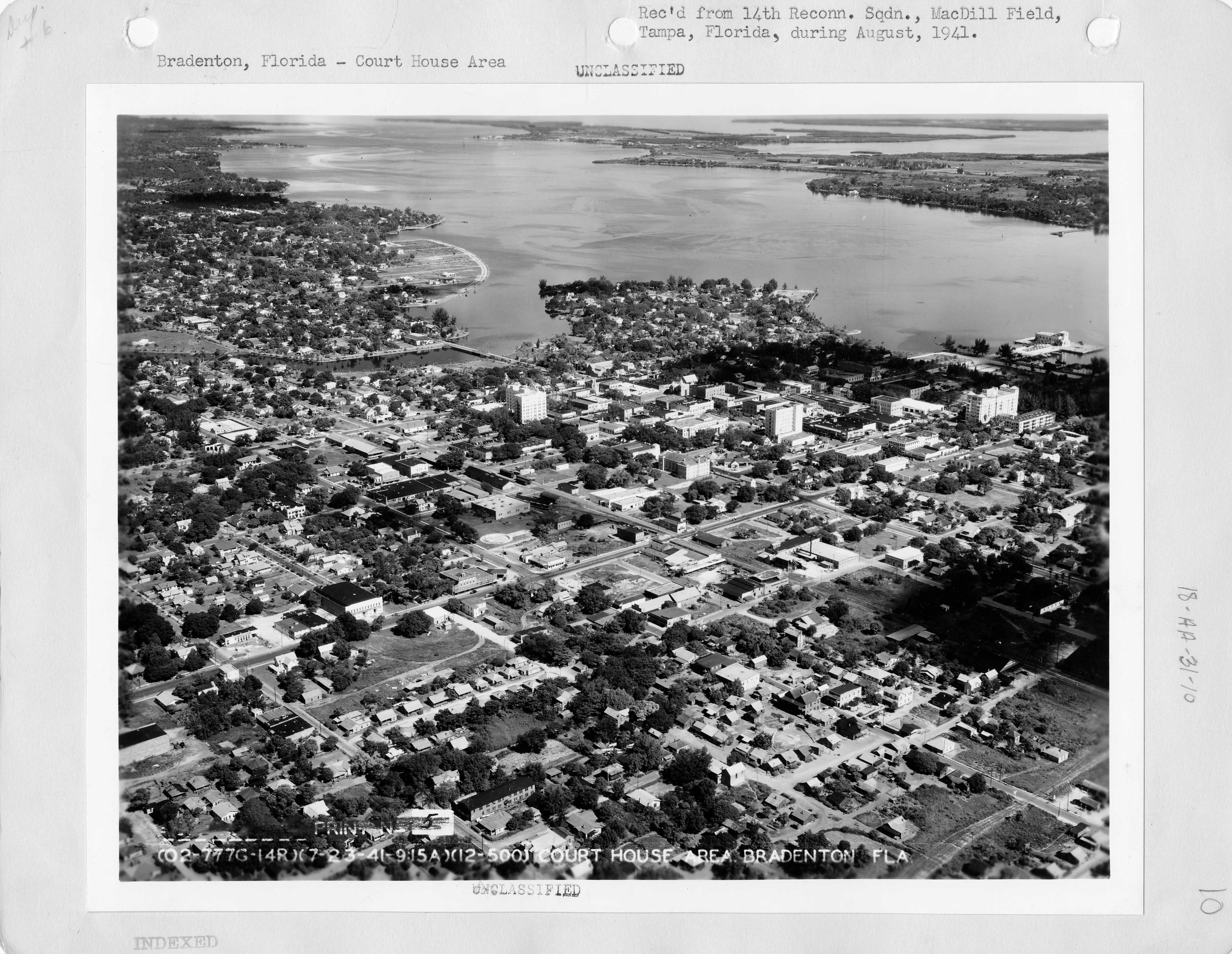
Downtown Bradenton in August 1941 in an aerial photograph taken by the US Army Air Forces

Bradenton was affected by World War II, as were many other cities in Florida and the United States. During the war, Manatee County had its own Civil Defense battalion with two subunits existing in Bradenton and another for nearby Manatee. A recreational center was opened in March 1942 in a building at the intersection of 6th Avenue and 12th Street West in the downtown area for soldiers. The recreation center closed in November 1945 and was popular with local soldiers, who visited it even when stationed outside Bradenton. Police Chief Clyde Benton expanded the police force by naming 45 officers to serve without pay during the war. Camp Weatherford located at LECOM Field existed for eight months at some point during the war as a training center for the US Army Signal Corps. About 350 soldiers were trained there during its existence. The camp itself often floods because of the rainy climate, frequent showers, clothes being washed, its low elevation, and its location near Wares Creek. A soldier named Joe Grossman at the camp ran a radio show broadcasting on WSPB called Weatherford Shinings. Local residents accommodated the troops stationed at the base in various ways. Bradenton merged with nearby Manatee (incorporated in 1888) in 1943. Manatee faced similar financial problems to Bradenton regarding its bonds and incurred high debt levels as a result, but it could not pay off the bonds.

==== Second half of the 20th century ====
Mayor A. Sterling Hall took office in January 1948. During his tenure, which lasted the next 20 years before he retired, the city was radically transformed. While serving as mayor, he was considered progressive regarding racial issues. As mayor, he created a municipal housing authority and also did slum clearance. He created quality housing for black residents, paved streets, and brought sewage service, water, and expanded garbage collection to black neighborhoods. Despite Mayor Hall's racial progressiveness, a Ku Klux Klan march occurred during his tenure in 1958 between Palmetto and Bradenton. The march was in response to a black group asking the county school board to either provide a new school building in Bradenton or integrate junior and senior high schools in the county. The Manavista Hotel was demolished in 1959 and replaced with a motel and later a retirement community. During the 1960s, the Manatee River was dredged, and an area nicknamed "the Sandpile" was developed over the course of the rest of the 20th century and the 21st century. During the Civil Rights Movement, Mayor Hall tried to make desegregation come about in his city in a nonviolent manner. Lunch counters were desegregated sometime during 1960 and a biracial commission was created during the summer of 1963.

Bradenton built a new city hall on 15th Street West, bordering Wares Creek, in January 1970, replacing the location on 13th Street West, which the city had used since 1913. Governor Claude R. Kirk Jr. arrived in Bradenton on April 6, 1970, in an attempt to stop Manatee County School District's desegregation busing. When he arrived, he suspended the district superintendent and the school district, leading to the district's suspension of busing for 2,500 students and 107 teachers. In February, he threatened to impeach a federal judge and said he would not sign checks to pay for busing students. He stayed in the Manatee County School District's administration building then located at the corner of 9th Avenue and 14th Street for a week before being threatened with a $10,000 fine per day if he continued to stay in the building and was unsuccessful with preventing bussing. The 8-floor Hotel Dixie Grande, which opened in April 1926, was demolished in August 1974.

The Green Bridge was replaced in 1986. The city hall moved to a new location on 12th Street West in November 1998 after the property was sold to a local resident with the intention of redeveloping it, but plans never materialized.

=== 21st century ===
The local resident who owned the former city hall property along Wares Creek sold it to a development group sometime in 2004, and the building was demolished in December 2004. The Bradenton Riverwalk, a 1.5-mile-long park along the Manatee River, opened in October 2012. McKechnie Field, the spring training stadium for the Pittsburgh Pirates, was renamed LECOM Park in February 2017.

=== Historic properties ===
Historic properties in Bradenton include:

- Bradenton Bank and Trust Company Building, 1925, now the Professional Building, 1023 Manatee Avenue, West
- Bradenton Carnegie Library, 1405 Fourth Avenue West
- Braden Castle Park Historic District, off Manatee Avenue and 27th St East
- Iron Block Building, 1896, 530 12th Street West (Old Main Street)
- Manatee County Courthouse, 1913, 1115 Manatee Avenue, West
- Old Manatee County Courthouse, 1860, 1404 Manatee Avenue, East
- Peninsular Telephone Company Building, 1925, 1009 4th Avenue, West

== Geography ==
According to the United States Census Bureau, Bradenton has a total area of 14.44 square miles (37.4 km^{2}), of which 2.33 square miles (6.0 km^{2}) (16.14%) are covered by water.

Bradenton is located on US 41 between Tampa and Sarasota. The area is surrounded by waterways, both fresh and salt water. Along the Gulf of Mexico and into Tampa Bay are over 20 miles (32 km) of Florida beaches, many of which are shaded by Australian pines. Bordered on the north by the Manatee River, Bradenton is located on the mainland and is separated from the outer barrier islands of Anna Maria Island and Longboat Key by the Intracoastal Waterway.

Downtown Bradenton is located in the northwest area of the city. Home to many of Bradenton's offices and government buildings, the tallest is the Bradenton Financial Center, 12 stories high, with its blue-green windows. The next-tallest is the new Manatee County Judicial Center with nine floors, located next to the historic courthouse. Other major downtown buildings include the Manatee County Government building and the headquarters of the School Board of Manatee County.

=== Climate ===
Bradenton has a typical Central Florida humid subtropical climate (Köppen Cfa) characterized by hot, humid summers and warm winters. Bradenton borders a tropical climate, with only one month (January) having a mean temperature below 64 °F (18 °C), which is the threshold for a tropical climate.

Climate data for Bradenton, Florida, 1991–2020 normals, extremes 1911–present
Month	Jan	Feb	Mar	Apr	May	Jun	Jul	Aug	Sep	Oct	Nov	Dec	Year
Record high °F (°C)	91 (33)	88 (31)	91 (33)	94 (34)	100 (38)	100 (38)	100 (38)	101 (38)	98 (37)	96 (36)	91 (33)	89 (32)	101 (38)
Mean maximum °F (°C)	82.8 (28.2)	84.1 (28.9)	86.1 (30.1)	89.9 (32.2)	93.4 (34.1)	95.7 (35.4)	95.8 (35.4)	95.3 (35.2)	94.0 (34.4)	91.0 (32.8)	86.6 (30.3)	83.4 (28.6)	96.6 (35.9)
Mean daily maximum °F (°C)	72.0 (22.2)	75.0 (23.9)	78.4 (25.8)	83.0 (28.3)	88.2 (31.2)	91.1 (32.8)	92.0 (33.3)	91.8 (33.2)	90.0 (32.2)	85.2 (29.6)	78.6 (25.9)	74.0 (23.3)	83.3 (28.5)
Daily mean °F (°C)	62.1 (16.7)	64.9 (18.3)	68.4 (20.2)	73.0 (22.8)	78.4 (25.8)	82.4 (28.0)	83.6 (28.7)	83.7 (28.7)	82.1 (27.8)	76.7 (24.8)	69.3 (20.7)	64.5 (18.1)	74.1 (23.4)
Mean daily minimum °F (°C)	52.2 (11.2)	54.8 (12.7)	58.4 (14.7)	63.0 (17.2)	68.5 (20.3)	73.7 (23.2)	75.2 (24.0)	75.5 (24.2)	74.2 (23.4)	68.3 (20.2)	60.1 (15.6)	55.0 (12.8)	64.9 (18.3)
Mean minimum °F (°C)	34.3 (1.3)	38.0 (3.3)	42.8 (6.0)	49.5 (9.7)	58.8 (14.9)	68.4 (20.2)	70.1 (21.2)	71.4 (21.9)	67.7 (19.8)	54.9 (12.7)	44.9 (7.2)	38.5 (3.6)	32.8 (0.4)
Record low °F (°C)	23 (−5)	21 (−6)	30 (−1)	38 (3)	46 (8)	52 (11)	62 (17)	60 (16)	58 (14)	40 (4)	27 (−3)	20 (−7)	20 (−7)
Average precipitation inches (mm)	2.76 (70)	1.99 (51)	3.11 (79)	2.53 (64)	3.49 (89)	9.03 (229)	8.91 (226)	10.07 (256)	7.43 (189)	2.88 (73)	1.82 (46)	2.26 (57)	56.28 (1,430)
Average precipitation days (≥ 0.01 in)	7.5	5.7	5.7	5.6	6.9	14.0	17.2	18.1	14.1	7.5	5.1	6.2	113.6
Source: NOAA

== Demographics ==
Historical population
Census	Pop.	Note	%±
1910	1,886		—
1920	3,868		105.1%
1930	5,986		54.8%
1940	7,444		24.4%
1950	13,604		82.8%
1960	19,380		42.5%
1970	21,040		8.6%
1980	30,228		43.7%
1990	43,779		44.8%
2000	49,504		13.1%
2010	49,546		0.1%
2020	55,698		12.4%
U.S. Decennial Census

Bradenton is a principal city of the North Port–Sarasota–Bradenton metropolitan statistical area, which had a population of 833,716 as of 2020.

=== Racial and ethnic composition ===
Bradenton racial composition (Hispanics excluded from racial categories) (NH = Non-Hispanic)
Race	Pop 2010	Pop 2020	% 2010	% 2020
White (NH)	31,918	33,568	64.42%	60.27%
Black or African American (NH)	7,693	7,840	15.53%	14.08%
Native American or Alaska Native (NH)	84	110	0.17%	0.20%
Asian (NH)	523	773	1.06%	1.39%
Pacific Islander or Native Hawaiian (NH)	30	53	0.06%	0.10%
Some other race (NH)	85	242	0.17%	0.43%
Two or more races/multiracial (NH)	789	1,883	1.59%	3.38%
Hispanic or Latino (any race)	8,424	11,229	17.00%	20.16%
Total	49,546	55,698		

=== 2020 census ===
As of the 2020 census, Bradenton had a population of 55,698. The median age was 47.1 years. 18.3% of residents were under the age of 18 and 27.3% of residents were 65 years of age or older. For every 100 females there were 88.4 males, and for every 100 females age 18 and over there were 85.2 males age 18 and over.

100.0% of residents lived in urban areas, while 0.0% lived in rural areas.

There were 24,357 households in Bradenton, of which 22.4% had children under the age of 18 living in them. Of all households, 37.1% were married-couple households, 19.4% were households with a male householder and no spouse or partner present, and 35.3% were households with a female householder and no spouse or partner present. About 34.9% of all households were made up of individuals and 18.4% had someone living alone who was 65 years of age or older. There were 13,033 families in the city.

There were 29,021 housing units, of which 16.1% were vacant. The homeowner vacancy rate was 2.3% and the rental vacancy rate was 9.6%.

Racial composition as of the 2020 census
Race	Number	Percent
White	36,063	64.7%
Black or African American	8,051	14.5%
American Indian and Alaska Native	241	0.4%
Asian	791	1.4%
Native Hawaiian and Other Pacific Islander	63	0.1%
Some other race	4,601	8.3%
Two or more races	5,888	10.6%
Hispanic or Latino (of any race)	11,229	20.2%

=== 2010 census ===
As of the 2010 United States census, 49,546 people, 21,120 households, and 12,341 families lived in the city.

=== 2000 census ===
As of the 2000 census, 49,504 people, 21,379 households, and 12,720 families were residing in the city. The population density was 4,088.5 inhabitants per square mile (1,578.6/km^{2}). The 24,887 housing units had an average density of 2,055.4 per square mile (793.6/km^{2}). The racial makeup of the city was 78.14% White, 15.11% African American, 0.79% Asian, 0.29% Native American, 0.05% Pacific Islander, 3.91% from other races, and 1.71% from two or more races. Hispanics or Latinos of any race were 11.26% of the population.

In 2000,of the 21,379 households, 23.0% had children under 18 living with them, 43.5% were married couples living together, 12.1% had a female householder with no husband present, and 40.5% were not families. About 34.1% of all households were made up of individuals, and 17.8% had someone living alone who was 65 or older. The average household size was 2.24, and the average family size was 2.85.

The city's age distribution was 21.6% under 18, 7.7% from 18 to 24, 25.3% from 25 to 44, 19.9% from 45 to 64, and 25.4% were 65 or older. The median age was 42 years. For every 100 females, there were 90.3 males. For every 100 females 18 and over, there were 85.9 males.

The median income for a household in the city was $34,902 and for a family was $42,366. Males had a median income of $28,262 versus $23,292 for females. The per capita income for the city was $20,133. About 9.7% of families and 13.6% of the population were below the poverty line, including 22.3% of those under 18 and 8.2% of those 65 or over.

== Economy ==
Tropicana Products was founded in Bradenton in 1947 by Anthony T. Rossi, an Italian immigrant. By 2004, it had over 8,000 employees and marketed its products throughout the United States. PepsiCo, Inc., acquired it in 1998. Tropicana's Juice Trains have been running to northern markets via CSX and predecessor railroads since 1971. In 2003, Pepsi relocated Tropicana's corporate headquarters to Chicago after it acquired Gatorade and consolidated its non-carbonated beverage businesses. However, their juice production facilities remain in Bradenton.

Champs Sports, a nationwide sports apparel chain, is headquartered in Bradenton. Department store chain Bealls is also headquartered in Bradenton.

Bradenton was significantly affected by the United States housing market correction, as reported by CNN, projecting a 24.8% loss in median home values by the third quarter of 2008. Real estate has shown a recovery since 2012, as home prices stabilized and inventory subsided.

== Transportation ==
Bradenton is served by Sarasota-Bradenton International Airport and is connected to St. Petersburg by the Sunshine Skyway Bridge. The Sunshine Skyway is a 5.5-mile (8.9 km) cross-bay bridge that rises 250 feet (76 m) above the bay at its highest point. Remnants of the old Skyway bridge have been converted into a fishing pier extending into Tampa Bay from both sides of the bay.

Manatee County Area Transit buses serve Bradenton, along with the cities/communities of Palmetto, Ellenton, Anna Maria, Holmes Beach, Bradenton Beach, Longboat Key, Tallevast and Samoset, with transfers to Sarasota and St. Petersburg. Free trolleys run north–south on Anna Maria Island, as well as to/from various points on the mainland. Amtrak charter buses run through downtown Bradenton outside the courthouse to Tampa Union Station and Venice.

== Government ==
The city is governed by a city council with five members. Each of the members is a resident of one of the five wards. The city council selects the city's vice mayor. The mayor and the five city council members are elected at-large for a four-year term. In Bradenton, the mayor functions as the head of the council and presides at meetings, and making a tie-breaking vote when needed. The city council has the ability to elect a vice mayor. A vice mayor has the ability to take over when the mayor vacates the office.

== Media ==
=== Newspapers ===
- The Bradenton Herald is Manatee County's local newspaper, published daily.
- The Bradenton Times is Manatee County's local online-only newspaper.
- Daily editions of the Sarasota Herald Tribune and the Tampa Bay Times are also available throughout the area.

=== Radio stations ===
Bradenton is located in the Sarasota-Bradenton radio market. It also receives many stations from the nearby Tampa-St. Petersburg market.

The stations listed below are located and/or licensed in Bradenton or Manatee County:

- WWPR – 1490 AM – studio and transmitter in Bradenton
- WBRD – 1420 AM – licensed to Palmetto
- WJIS – 88.1 FM
- WKVZ – 98.7 FM (transmitter in Pinellas County)
- WHPT – 102.5 FM (Sarasota; transmitter in northeastern corner of Sarasota County; studios in St. Petersburg)
- WRUB – 106.5 FM

=== Television stations ===
WSNN-LD is based in Sarasota, but transmits from Manatee County. WWSB channel 40, the local ABC affiliate, is based in Sarasota, but has a transmitter in Parrish, northeast of Bradenton; it is seen on cable channel 7 on most cable systems in the area. WXPX-TV channel 66, an independent television station (with Ion Television on its second digital subchannel), is licensed in Bradenton, with its transmitter in Riverview in Hillsborough County.

== Education ==
Manatee County Public Schools operates area public schools.

The State College of Florida, Manatee-Sarasota's SCF main campus is located in Bayshore Gardens, and State College of Florida Collegiate School has a campus on the SCF Bradenton campus.

== Culture ==
Bradenton is home to the Washington Park neighborhood, a historically African American community where Lincoln Academy was located.

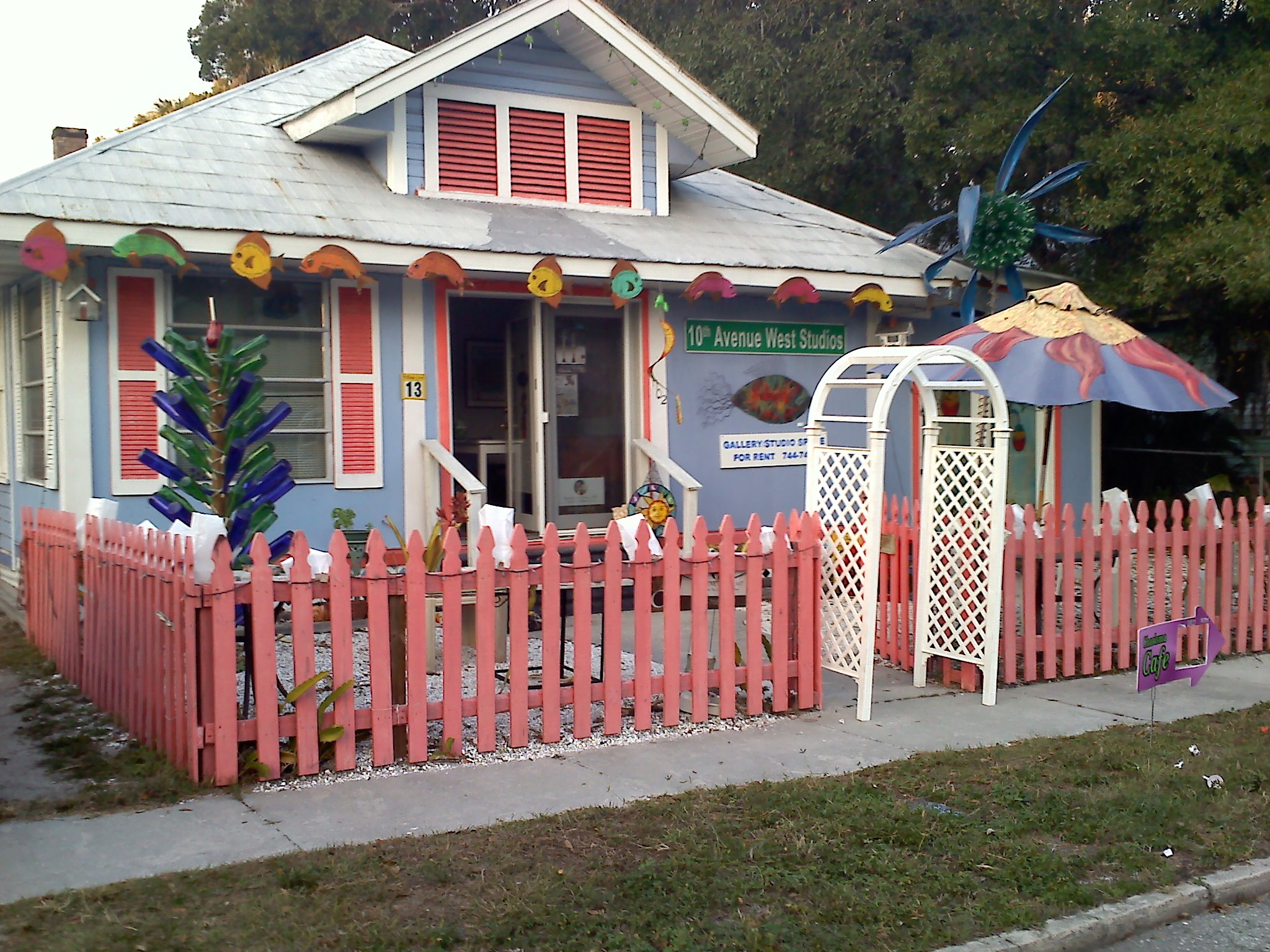
Some of the restored homes

Bradenton is home to the Village of the Arts, a renovated neighborhood immediately south of downtown, where special zoning laws allow residents to live and work in their homes. Many of these once-dilapidated houses have been converted into studios, galleries, small restaurants, and other small businesses. The Village of the Arts promotes its First Fridays activities, celebrating the seasons and different holidays. The Village of the Arts remains the largest arts district on the Gulf Coast.

The Manatee Players, which reside at the Manatee Performing Arts Center, have a three-year record of first-place wins within the Florida Theatre Conference and the Southeastern Theatre Conference competitions. In addition, the theatre currently holds the first-place title from the American Association of Community Theatre competition.

The Bishop Museum of Science and Nature, a museum-planetarium-aquarium located in downtown Bradenton, offers a glimpse of Florida history, a star and multimedia show, and an ongoing lecture and film series. The Parker Manatee Aquarium was the permanent home to Manatee County's most famous resident and official mascot, Snooty, the manatee. Born at the Miami Aquarium and Tackle Company on July 21, 1948, Snooty was one of the first recorded captive manatee births. He was the oldest manatee in captivity, and likely the oldest manatee in the world. On July 23, 2017, two days after his 69th birthday, Snooty died as the result of drowning.

ArtCenter Manatee is the center for art and art education in Manatee County. The nearly 10,000 sq ft (930 m^{2}) building in downtown Bradenton features three galleries, five classrooms, an Artists' Market gift shop and an art library featuring over 3,000 art volumes.

The nonprofit organization Realize Bradenton works with the above-listed cultural partners to promote downtown Bradenton as a destination for the arts. It also produces events in the downtown area with a focus on arts and culture.

Additionally, the town is the subject of the We the Kings song "This Is Our Town"; they, as well as the band Have Gun, Will Travel, originate from Bradenton.

== Sports ==
Bradenton is home of Major League Baseball's Pittsburgh Pirates spring training and development facilities of their Class A-Advanced Florida State League affiliate Bradenton Marauders, which play home games at downtown's LECOM Park.

The city is home to the State College of Florida, Manatee–Sarasota Manatees sports teams.

Manatee County high schools produce several teams, including Manatee High School, whose football team was nationally ranked in the 1950s, 1980s, and 1990s and regained their national status in 2009. Manatee High School has won five football state championships. Bradenton is also home to the IMG Academy, from 1999 to 2017 the home of the U.S U-17 residential soccer program.

The Concession Golf Club in Bradenton was home of the 2015 NCAA Division I Men's Golf Championship, the 2021 WGC-Workday Championship, and is scheduled to host the 2026, 2027, and 2028 Senior PGA Championship events.

Bradenton and Sarasota together hosted the 2021 U-18 Baseball World Cup in 2022, after it had been postponed due to the COVID-19 pandemic.

== Points of interest ==
- Bishop Museum of Science and Nature, home of the late manatee Snooty
- Bradenton Riverwalk
- De Soto National Memorial
- DeSoto Square (Now abandoned and vacant)
- Manatee Village Historical Park
- Neal Preserve
- Pittsburgh Pirates spring training at LECOM Park
- Robinson Preserve
- Village of the Arts
