= Have Gun – Will Travel (disambiguation) =

Have Gun – Will Travel is an American radio and television series.

Have Gun – Will Travel may also refer to:

- Have Gun, Will Travel (band), an American alternative and folk rock band
- Have Gun Will Travel, a 1998 book about Death Row Records by Ronin Ro
