= Iron Block Building =

Iron Block Building may refer to:

- Iron Block Building (Bradenton, Florida)
- Iron Block Building (Milwaukee, Wisconsin) on the National Register of Historic Places listings in Milwaukee, Wisconsin
