= Bishop Museum of Science and Nature =

Science museum in Bradenton, Florida

The Bishop Museum of Science and Nature
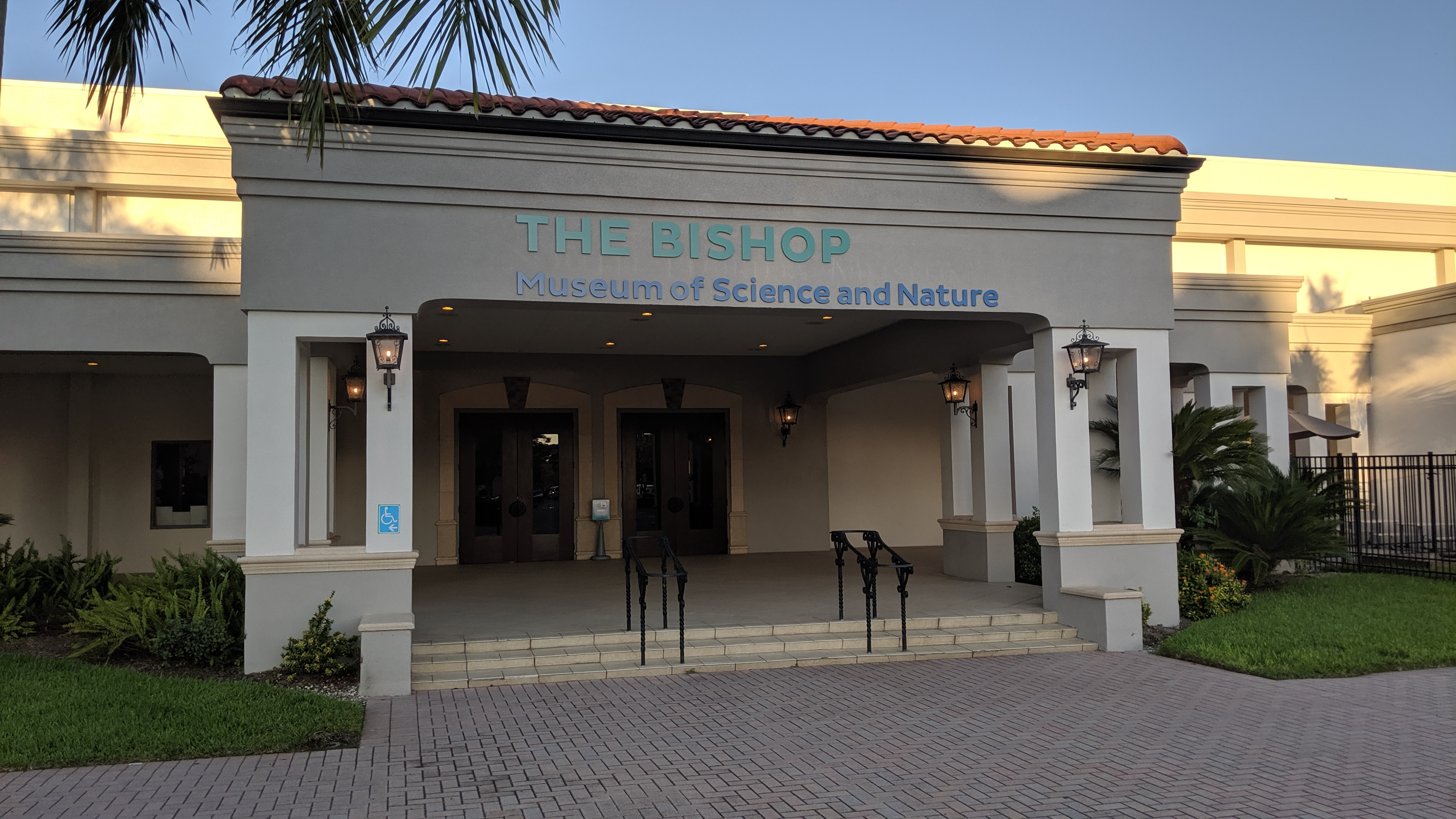
- Former name: South Florida Museum
- Established: 1946
- Location: 201 10th Street West; Bradenton, Florida
- Coordinates: 27°29′54″N 82°34′18″W
- Type: Anthropology, aquarium, astronomy, planetarium, archeology, children's, natural history
- Director: Andrew Sandall
- Curator: Tiffany La Britt
- Public transit access: Manatee County Area Transit (MCAT)
- Website: bishopscience.org

The Bishop Museum of Science and Nature (formerly the South Florida Museum), located in Bradenton, Florida, is a natural history museum specializing in the history of Florida's gulf coast. It houses exhibits highlighting Florida's history from the prehistoric to the present. The Museum also features regularly changing exhibits in the East Gallery and in other small galleries throughout the first and second floors.

The Bishop includes the Planetarium and the Parker Manatee Rehabilitation Habitat, which housed Snooty, the oldest known manatee in the world at the time of his death. The Parker Manatee Rehabilitation Habitat is a founding member of the Manatee Rescue and Rehabilitation Partnership and has rehabilitated more than 40 manatees since 1998. The Planetarium, which was opened in the mid-1960s, has since been entirely remodeled and received a significant technical upgrade in 2020.

== History ==
Founded in 1946 by community leaders, the South Florida Museum opened in 1947 on Bradenton's Memorial Pier with the Montague Tallant collection of Florida's First Peoples pre- and immediate post-contact archaeological material, as well as collections relating to the scientific and cultural history of southwest Florida and Manatee County. The Museum emerged as a leading cultural organization in the community, providing educational programs and field trips to tens of thousands of students through the years. In 1949, an exhibition pool for a baby manatee was added, and Baby Snoots became an instant attraction and official mascot of Manatee County.

Having outgrown its space at the pier, construction began on a new facility at the present location, which included a larger aquarium pool, a Spanish Courtyard, and a planetarium. The new, expanded facility opened in October 1966. In 1980 the expanded Spanish Plaza opened, emphasizing the area's Spanish heritage with a full-scale replica of Hernando DeSoto's home in Barcarrota, Spain, a 16th-century chapel, and a fountain with a bronze sculpture of DeSoto on Horseback. In 1993, the newly designed and massively expanded Parker Manatee Aquarium joined the South Florida Museum Complex and became a part of the Manatee Rehabilitation Network with a 60,000-gallon pool capable of housing up to three adult manatees.

In 2000, a campaign known as "Strengthening the Legacy" raised funds to renovate the Museum's permanent exhibits. The ambitious renovation transformed the Museum and established it as a leading natural and cultural history museum on Florida's Gulf Coast. In 2001, a devastating fire damaged the Bishop Planetarium, education and administrative wing, prolonging renovations. In 2002, the exhibit renovation opened to the public on the first floor. After a significant federal grant and community support, a new state-of-the-art planetarium and theatre opened in 2005. Renovations of the second floor continued in 2006. Second-floor renovations included a new medical gallery, patrons' gallery, visible storage galleries, river heritage hall, and an environmental wing of exhibits depicting Florida pine uplands, riverine, estuarine, and gulf waters habitats.

In 2012, the Museum celebrated its 65th anniversary, and in 2013, Snooty's 65th birthday. Snooty died on July 23, 2017, shortly after celebrating his 69th birthday. He was the oldest manatee in the world at the time of his death.

The museum was renamed to its current name on April 10, 2019.

== Tallant collection ==
The archeological artifacts collected throughout Florida by Montague Tallant, a Bradenton furniture store owner, established the foundation for the South Florida Museum. His frequent pottery hunting activities led to the accumulation of a sizable collection of aboriginal pottery, stone and shell tools, and European material from the early Spanish exploration and settlement of Florida. In the 1930s, Matthew Stirling, the director of the Smithsonian's archeological digs in Florida, became Tallant's friend and mentor. Stirling exhibited and interpreted locally collected Smithsonian artifacts at Bradenton Memorial Pier in 1934, and Tallant followed suit with his own collection in 1935 under the auspices of the Manatee Chamber of Commerce. Tallant's exhibits were popular with both the community and tourists.

With the success of the 1939 DeSoto Celebration (marking the 400th anniversary of DeSoto's landing in Florida) and an increase in tourism as the country recovered from the Great Depression, Tallant began to consider exhibiting his collections to a wider audience in a museum setting. In 1941, he opened a museum in the second-floor space of his furniture store and called it the Manatee County Museum. While popular with locals, the museum failed to attract tourists, especially during the World War II when tourism in Florida dropped drastically.

The cost of maintaining the collection and the space, combined with Tallant's interest in future projects, led him to entertain purchase offers in the late 1940s. He wanted the collection to remain in the local region, so he ultimately sold it to the Bradenton Junior Chamber of Commerce, and in 1948, the collection became part of the newly formed South Florida Museum. Much of the collection remains in this museum and is the foundation for the Museum's cultural and anthropological exhibitions. It is impossible to determine the exact number of Florida sites investigated by Tallant, but it is estimated to be at least 169, most of these in the southern part of the state. The large number of metal artifacts is striking and unequaled in any other Florida collection.

== Bishop Planetarium ==
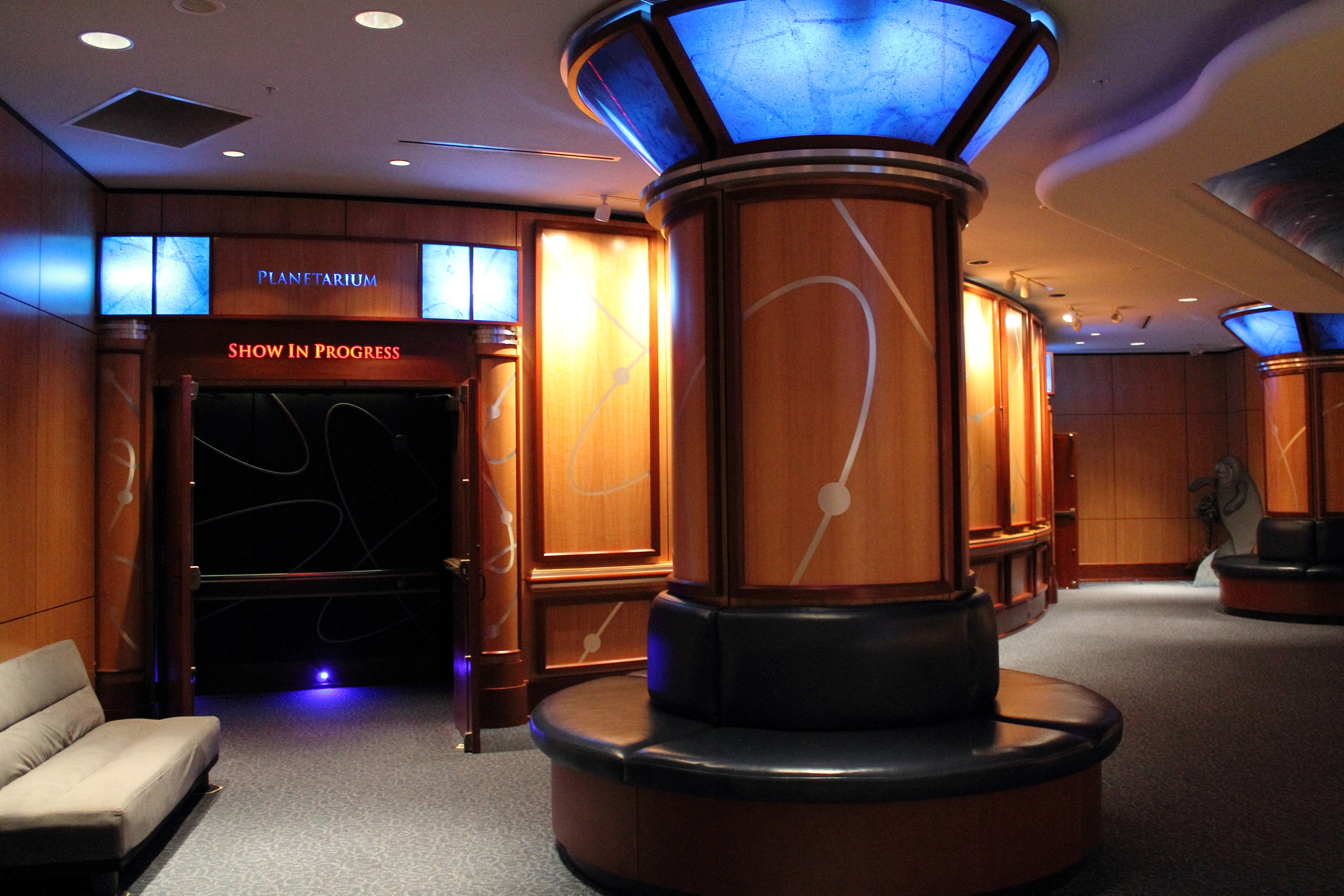
The lobby of the Bishop Planetarium located at the South Florida Museum in Bradenton, FL

In the 1960s, plans were made to create a new facility for the Museum, and prominent local physician and philanthropist (and one of the Museum's "founding fathers"), William Daniel "W.D." Sugg, felt strongly that the new space should house a planetarium. While there was a consensus among the board that the new facility should have an auditorium, Dr. Sugg envisioned a dual-purpose facility that could serve as both auditorium and planetarium similar to the Hayden Planetarium at the American Museum of Natural History in New York City. The inspiration of the Hayden would come full circle in 2004 when the museum hired its current Planetarium Director, Jeff Rodgers, who worked at the American Museum of Natural History with world-renowned physicist and Hayden director, Neil Degrasse Tyson.

In 1966, the Museum moved to its new facility and opened the Bishop Planetarium, so named for the long-time benefactor and philanthropist Edward E. "Ned" Bishop. Bishop's wife, Lillian "Patty" Bishop, donated $375,000 toward the construction in honor of her late husband, providing the majority of the funds needed to complete the project. Coincidentally, Mrs. Bishop, who had been ill and who chronically shunned publicity, did not attend the Planetarium's dedication but was represented by her niece, Mary Parker, for whom the Museum's aquarium would be named some 30 years later.

The Museum had decided that rather than house the Planetarium in a "metal box" like so many planetariums of the day, they would use a sculpted concrete dome that would attract attention from the nearby bridges over the Manatee River.

The planetarium operated successfully for over 30 years, but in the early morning hours of August 23, 2001, an electrical fire, thought to have started in the Planetarium's lighting equipment, destroyed the auditorium's interior and most of the offices and support spaces in the Museum's north wing. The Planetarium's concrete dome and lack of windows helped to keep the fire contained to the north wing, sparing the cultural and natural history collections in the main museum, but it also turned the Planetarium into a kiln, gutting the theater and its projection equipment. The events of 9/11 and Tropical Storm Gabrielle impeded recovery efforts, and the Museum did not reopen to the public until September 23. The Planetarium and the north wing offices would remain closed until a $4.5 million renovation was completed in 2005. The reborn Bishop Planetarium opened with new projection and sound systems, but by 2012, the equipment was already outdated. In 2013, a new projection system was installed that was 25 times sharper and five times brighter, placing the Planetarium once again on par with some of the best in the country.

== Spanish Plaza ==
In 1967, longtime Museum President Dr. W.D. Sugg linked his work on the annual De Soto celebration to his plans for the Museum's Spanish Courtyard. He planned a major trip for DeSoto Society members to Barcarrota, Spain, to obtain artifacts and exhibits typical of the DeSoto period for the Museum. This trip and others would eventually bear fruit in the remodel of the old courtyard into the new Spanish Plaza, which was completed in 1980. The pink Georgia marble, railings, and other architectural fabric used in the courtyard project were salvaged from the 1920s Hotel Dixie Grande during its demolition in late 1974.

The area is used for museum events and also as event venues by the Museum, including the small replica chapel, which is used for weddings at the facility.

== Parker Manatee Rehabilitation Habitat ==
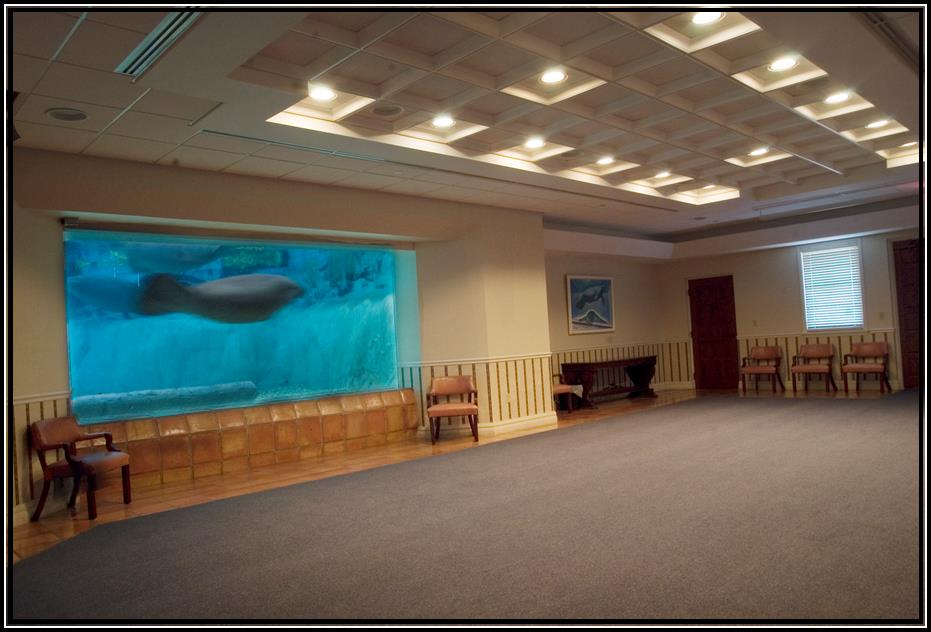
The "Boardroom" at the South Florida Museum is a unique meeting space with a view of the Parker Manatee Rehabilitation Habitat.

A manatee habitat had been a feature of the Museum almost since its inception, but as more was learned about manatees and their care, it became clear that a larger and more well-equipped facility was needed for the Museum's resident manatee, Snooty. In 1979, plans were made to add a new wing to the museum to include such facilities. Completed in 1993, the wing was officially named the Parker Manatee Rehabilitation Habitat in 1994 in honor of long-time board member and patron, Mary Parker.

The new manatee wing of the museum completed the Spanish Plaza and included above- and below-water viewing capabilities, a medical pool, an exhibition area, and a 60,000-gallon tank for Snooty and additional manatees. The wing included a boardroom still used by the Museum, which also has a view of the Manatee tank. The new pool was nine times larger and twice as deep as the previous one. The size and depth seemed to baffle Snooty when he was first placed into his new home, since he had previously lived his whole life in smaller accommodations. Further renovation in 1998 enhanced the habitat's display and spectator areas to their current standard.

With the larger pool, the manatee rehabilitation habitat is designed to house up to three adult manatees, and includes a medical pool which can be used to isolate a manatee and lower the water level. This makes veterinary exams and procedures easier to accomplish and less stressful for the animal. The main pool offers both shallow and deep water, allowing resident manatees to engage in a wider variety of natural social and feeding behaviors. With these new facilities, the Museum was certified by the USDA in 1997 as a "Level 2" manatee rehabilitation facility, meaning the Parker Nanatee Rehabilitation Habitat could house rehab animals that no longer required critical veterinary care, but could not yet be released to the wild. This cleared the way for the Museum to partner with the Manatee Rescue & Rehabilitation Partnership and Sea to Shore Alliance to care for rehabilitating manatees and eventually return them to the wild. Since 1997, the Museum has cared for and successfully released more than 25 manatees.

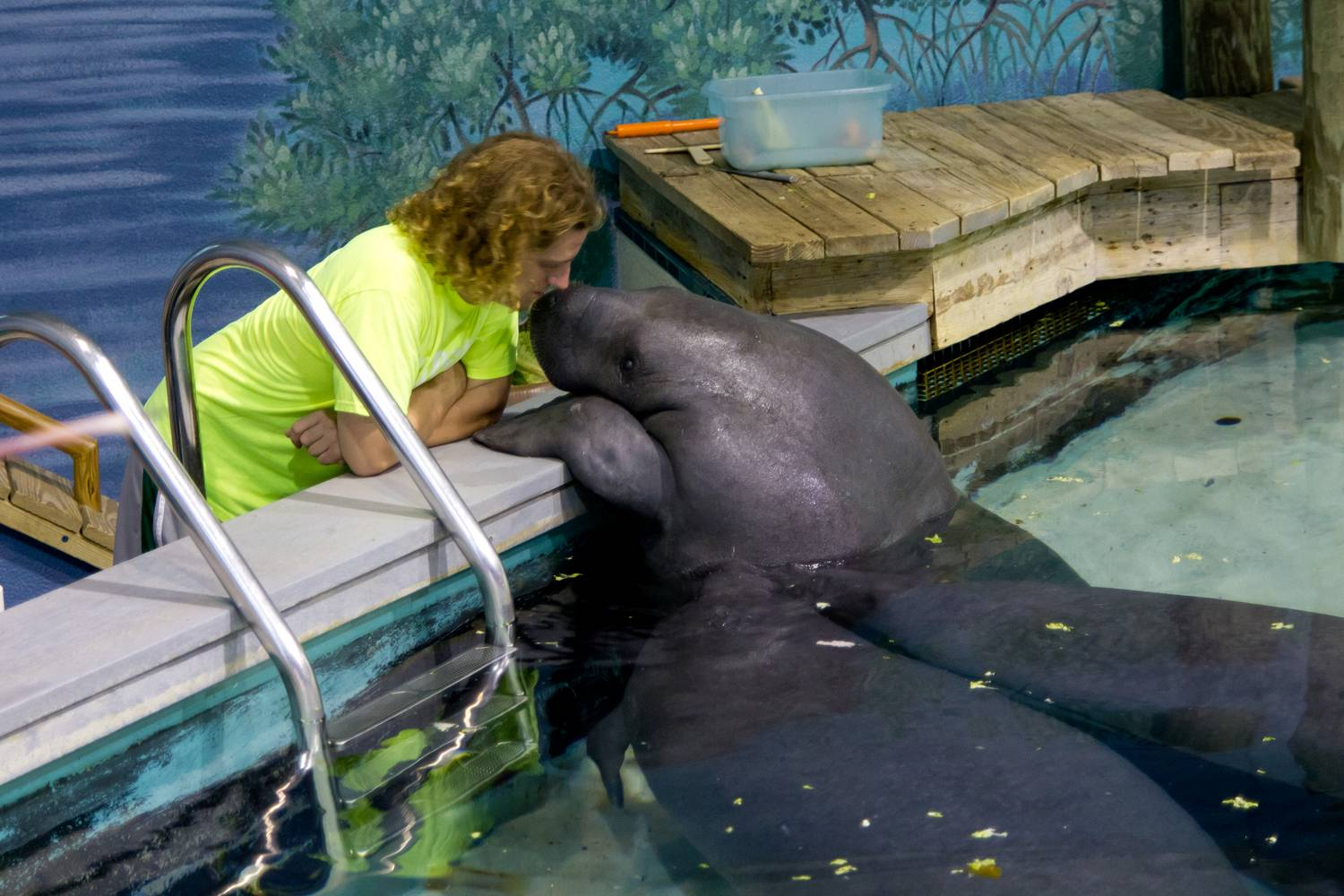
Snooty and handler on his 63rd birthday, July 2011

=== Snooty the Manatee ===
Snooty was a Florida Manatee, a subspecies of the West Indian Manatee, that resided at the Museum's Parker Manatee Habitat. Born at the Miami Aquarium and Tackle Company on July 21, 1948. Snooty was one of the first recorded captive manatee births. Snooty was the oldest manatee in captivity, and likely the oldest manatee in the world. As Snooty was unreleasable, he was a permanent manatee resident at the Museum and one of a select few captive manatees in the United States that were allowed to interact with human handlers. This made him uniquely valuable to manatee research and education. The Parker Manatee Rehabilitation Habitat also rehabilitates wild manatees; currently there are three other manatees residing at the aquarium.

On July 23, 2017, two days after his 69th birthday, Snooty died as a result of drowning. A hatch door that accesses a plumbing area had been accidentally opened, allowing the manatees access to an unsafe area. The younger and smaller manatees were able to go in and out of the area, but due to Snooty's size, he could not return through the hatch to access air. The panel was loose the day before his birthday. After an investigation into the death, the museum stated that manatee staff knew that a panel leading to the compartment where Snooty drowned was askew or missing screws, but because of failures in record keeping, reporting, communications and follow-through, no action was taken and no repairs were made. They also confirmed that Marilyn Margold, the Director of Living Collections at the time, was no longer employed at the Museum.
