= Village of the Arts =

Art district in Bradenton, Florida

The Village of the Arts is located in Bradenton, Florida. The Village covers 36 acres (150,000 m^{2}) and contains over 200 homes, art galleries, restaurants, workshops and studios. Area residents live alongside the artists. Many galleries/studios in this area are also homes, making this restored section of Bradenton unique with its many artists-in-residence.

== Village area ==
The Village of the Arts is a residential and business community contained between 14th Street West, Route 41/9th Street West and 16th Avenue West in Bradenton, Florida, approximately 50 miles (80 km) south of Tampa and 14 miles north of Sarasota. This area of Bradenton originally consisted of 1920s style architecture. From May 31, 1937, until the site was home to the Bradenton General Hospital.

Some of the buildings used for galleries and homes are as old as 100 years.

== Live-work space ==
The Village is a diverse collection of artists, galleries and fine food. Artisians from the Village of the Arts received regulatory relief from the city of Bradenton allowing artists-in-residence to live and work out of their homes. At one time, the houses in this area of Bradenton were considered dilapidated and an eyesore. Most have been restored, painted in colorful hues and pastels, and converted into workshops, studios, medical facilities, family activities, galleries and cafes.

== Artistic media ==
Village artists practice their craft in the following areas:

Goldsmithing, Silversmithing, stained glass, altered books, copper-pigment work, assemblage, collage, oil-painting, quilting, acrylic painting, fiber art, mixed media, encaustic painting, fashion and custom clothing, antiques and their restoration, sculpture, drawing, photography, book-selling, basket-weaving, re-cycled and up-cycled art, botanical objects, mosaic, clay, pottery, music instruction and performance, art instruction, watercolors, dichroic glass, woodcarving, jewelry, cut and polished stone work, metal working and many more.

Many artisans accept commissions, i.e., work as ordered and designed by a patron/customer. Patrons are able to become involved in the production of a piece that meets the needs of a specific space in their home or office.

== See also ==
- Artist-run initiative
- Artist-run space
- National Cooperative Business Association
