= Wares Creek =

Stream in Manatee County, Florida

Location
- Country: United States
- State: Florida

Physical characteristics
- Source
  - location: Bradenton
  - coordinates: 27°28′38″N 82°34′41″W
- Mouth: Manatee River
  - location: Palmetto
  - coordinates: 27°30′09″N 82°34′41″W
- Length: 5 miles (8.0 km)

Wares Creek is a 5-mile-long (8.0 km) stream in Manatee County, Florida. The stream drains into the Manatee River. The creek's name is used by the Wares Creek neighborhood along its downstream path near downtown Bradenton. Neighborhood association activities have included a cleanup of the creek. A canoe trail was proposed alongside it. The Wares Creek Bridge along Manatee Avenue crosses Wares Creek.

== History ==
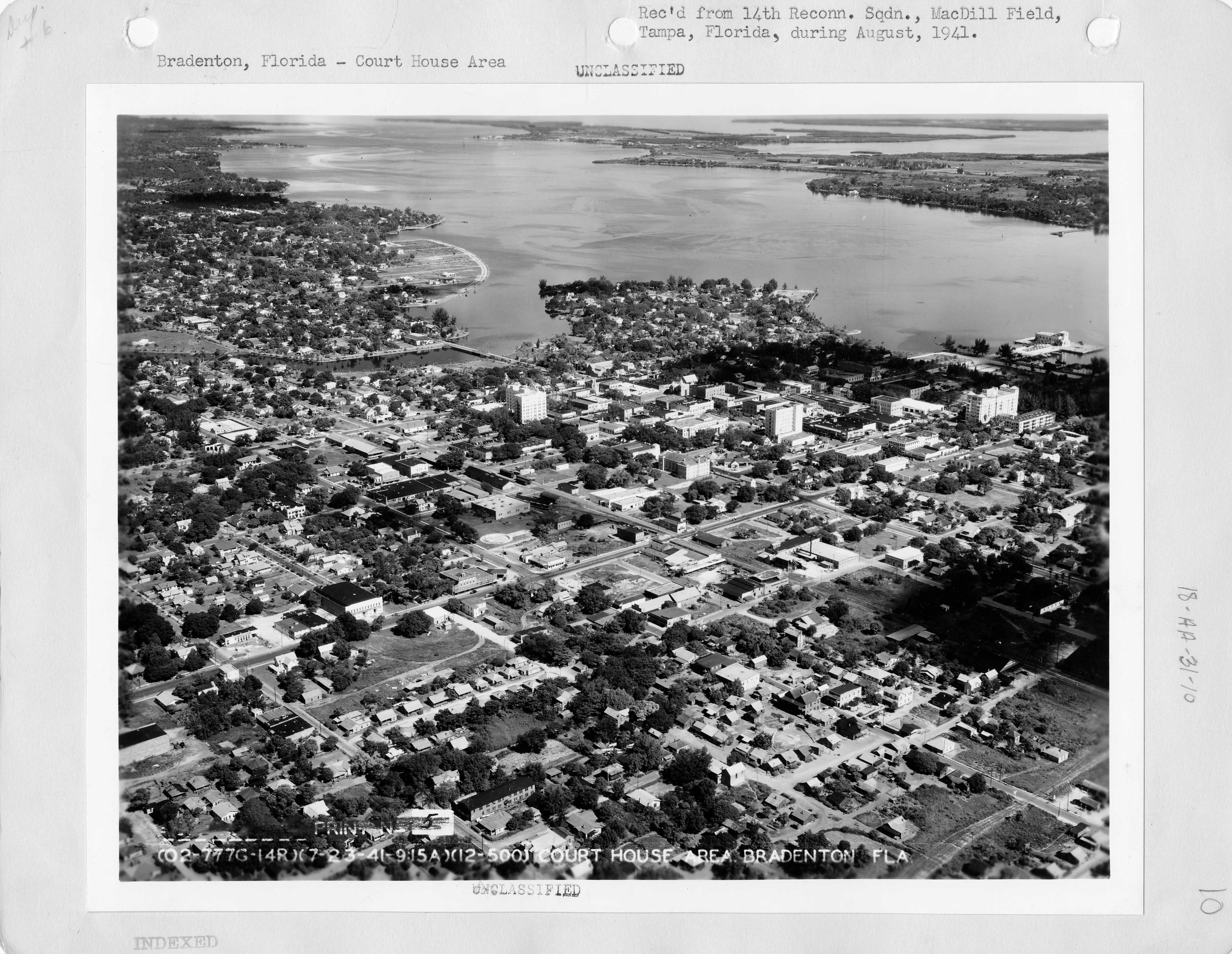
Wares Creek as seen in a photo taken by the United States Army Air Forces.

The name's origin is Elbridge Ware, who moved to the area from Tallahassee with his wife in 1845. Ware's home was destroyed in a hurricane the following year, resulting in the Ware's family moving back to Tallahassee.

In 2011, money was allocated to dredge the creek for flood control.

A sewer main broke in 2019, where approximately 80,000 US gallons (300,000 L; 67,000 imp gal) of wastewater entered the creek.
