= Braden Castle Park Historic District =

Historic district in Florida, United States

- U.S. National Register of Historic Places
- U.S. Historic district
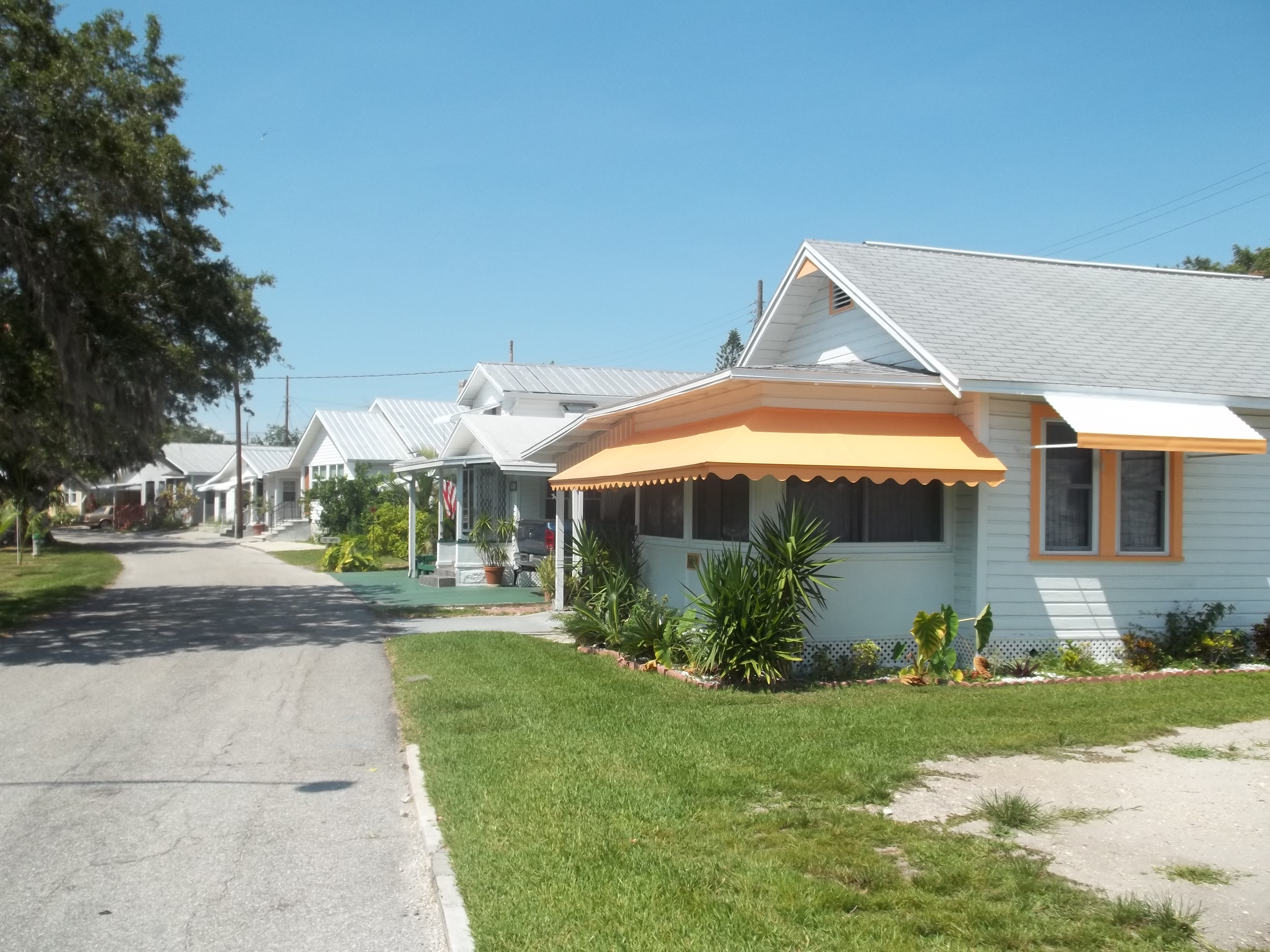

- Location within Florida
- Location: Bradenton, Florida
- Coordinates: 27°29′56″N 82°31′49″W
- Area: 34 acres (0.14 km^{2})
- NRHP reference No.: 83001428
- Added to NRHP: May 9, 1983

The Braden Castle Park Historic District is a U.S. historic district (designated as such on May 9, 1983) located in Bradenton, Florida. The district is bounded by the Manatee and Braden Rivers, Ponce DeLeon Street, and Pelot Avenue. It contains 192 historic buildings and 3 structures.

The historic district contains ruins of the 1850 Braden House, a house of tabby owned by Joseph Braden.
