= Manatee Rescue & Rehabilitation Partnership =

American conservation organization

- Abbreviation: MRP
- Predecessor: Manatee Rehabilitation Partnership
- Purpose: Manatee rehabilitation and rescue
- Website: www.manateerescue.org

The Manatee Rescue & Rehabilitation Partnership (MRP) is a cooperative group of non-profit, private, state, and federal entities dedicated to the rescue, rehabilitation, release, and post-release monitoring of manatees. The group's mission statement is: “To inspire and advance manatee conservation by partnering cooperatively in manatee rescue, rehabilitation, release, and monitoring efforts; improve understanding of manatee biology and health through scientific research; and promote stewardship and financial support through public education.”

== History ==
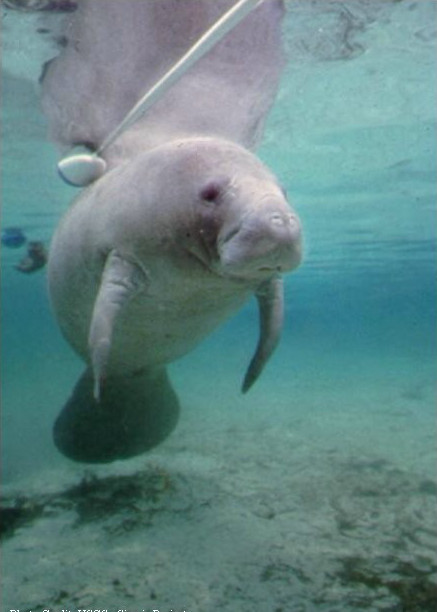
A Florida manatee

The Manatee Rehabilitation Partnership was founded in the early 2000s to fund and direct post-release monitoring efforts of Florida manatees, which are designated by the federal endangered species list as “threatened”. At the time, the United States Fish and Wildlife Service managed manatee rehabilitation and releases while the Manatee Rehabilitation Partnership managed the monitoring efforts. A group of experts working for the Wildlife Trust conducted the initial tagging and tracking.

In 2012, USFWS reduced its involvement in the day-to-day management of manatee rehabilitation to an advisory capacity only. Workshops were held with manatee rescue and rehabilitation stakeholders to plan and create a new organization that would perform the tasks that the USFWS had done before. This resulted in the replacement of the Manatee Rehabilitation Partnership with the Manatee Rescue & Rehabilitation Partnership (MRP). Representing its individual member organizations, the MRP acted as a self-governing entity for overseeing rescue, rehabilitation, release, and monitoring of Florida manatees. Most of the organizations and experts that had participated in the Manatee Rehabilitation Partnership joined the new organization.

== Functions ==
The MRP coordinates the rescue, rehabilitation, release, and monitoring of sick or injured Florida manatees, with help from the Florida Fish and Wildlife Conservation Commission and other program partners. Sick or injured manatees are placed in federally authorized acute care rehabilitation facilities which treat the manatees until they have recovered. The current acute care facilities include SeaWorld Orlando, ZooTampa, Jacksonville Zoo and Gardens, and Homosassa Springs Wildlife State Park. When animals are stable and no longer receiving medical care, they are sometimes housed in secondary holding facilities to gain weight and await appropriate conditions for release back into the wild. The current second stage facilities include The Parker Manatee Rehabilitation Habitat at the Bishop Museum of Science and Nature, The Seas at EPCOT, Cincinnati Zoo, and Columbus Zoo. Veterinary experts monitor the health of the manatees during all phases of the program to give the manatees the best chance of survival. When an animal is ready for release, its information is provided to the release committee who coordinates the logistics of releasing each manatee. Manatees with little experience of surviving in the wild are tagged with satellite tags and monitored for a period of one year to help ensure that they are capable of surviving in the wild.

== Structure and budget ==
The member organizations of the MRP elect its officers, who include the chairman and co-chairman of the group, as well as organizational subcommittees, which each have a chairman or co-chairs. The current subcommittees include Rescue/Rehabilitation, Release, Monitoring, Veterinary, and Education/Outreach. Working groups can be created at the discretion of the chairs to address particular issues needing extra attention. Biannual meetings are held of the entire membership, which includes SeaWorld Orlando, Walt Disney World, The Seas at Epcot, Columbus Zoo, Cincinnati Zoo, U.S. Fish and Wildlife Service, Florida Fish and Wildlife Conservation Commission, Mote Marine Laboratory, Save the Manatee Club, Pittsburgh Zoo, Jacksonville Zoo and Gardens, Homosassa Springs Wildlife State Park, ZooTampa, University of Florida Aquatic Animal Health Program, and Clearwater Marine Aquarium. Because it is a self governing entity, the MRP requires participation from all of its members to ensure agreement and function efficiently.

The budget of the MRP is funded by the state of Florida though the Marine Resources Conservation Trust Fund, in addition to contributions of its members. Other member organizations of the MRP donate their services to the organization by treating and housing the manatees and providing in-kind services. It is very expensive to track and monitor manatees post-release, so this function has historically made up the bulk of the MRP's operating expenses. An increase in the number of manatees requiring tracking in recent years has strained the resources of the MRP, causing the organization to seek additional outside funding.

== See also ==
- United States Fish and Wildlife Service
