= Peninsular Telephone Company Building =

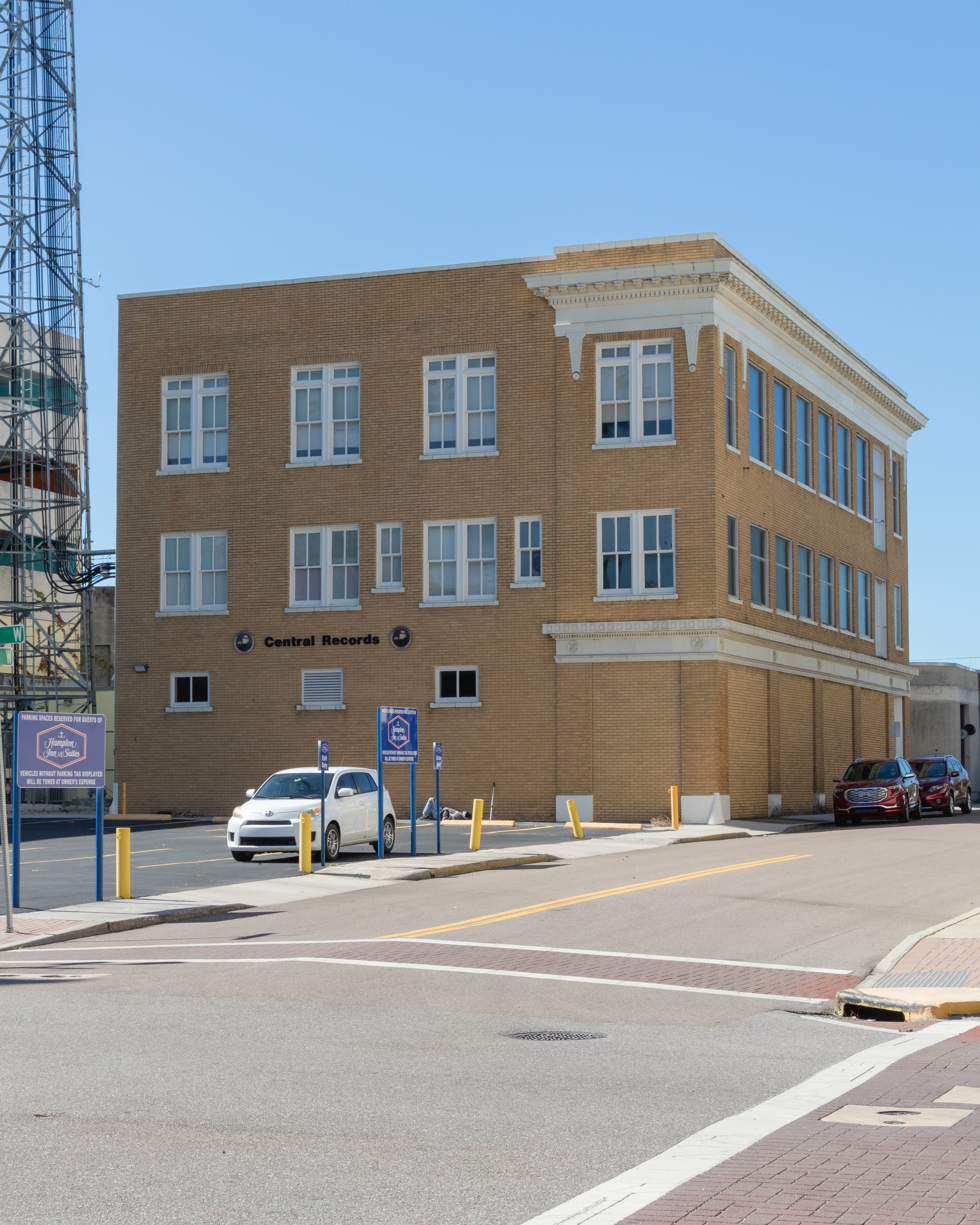
- Peninsular Telephone Company Building, Bradenton, Florida. Constructed: 1925. Architect: J.H. Johnson.
- Interactive map of the Peninsular Telephone Company Building area

General information
- Architectural style: Commercial or Chicago School
- Location: 1009 4th Ave. W. Bradenton, Florida, United States
- Coordinates: 27.4965°N 82.57251°W
- Completed: 1925
- Client: Peninsular Telephone Company

Design and construction
- Architect: J. H. Johnson
- Engineer: Builder: unknown

The Peninsular Telephone Company Building, also known as the Peninsula Telephone Company Building or the GTE Building, is an historic three-story yellow brick building located at 1009 4th Avenue, West in Bradenton, Florida. Built in 1925 for Peninsular, an independent telephone operating company based in Tampa which later became part of General Telephone (GTE), it was designed by local architect J. H. Johnson in the Commercial or Chicago School of architecture. Although not as ornate as most buildings of this style, it does have some ornamental features on its ground floor as well as a cornice topping its third floor. After the phone company stopped having a local walk in customer service center, the street level windows were bricked in. Today the building is owned by Manatee County and is used for storage. It is included in a walking tour of downtown Bradenton and is included in the city's master list of historic buildings.
