= Snooty =

Manatee born and held in captivity in Florida, US

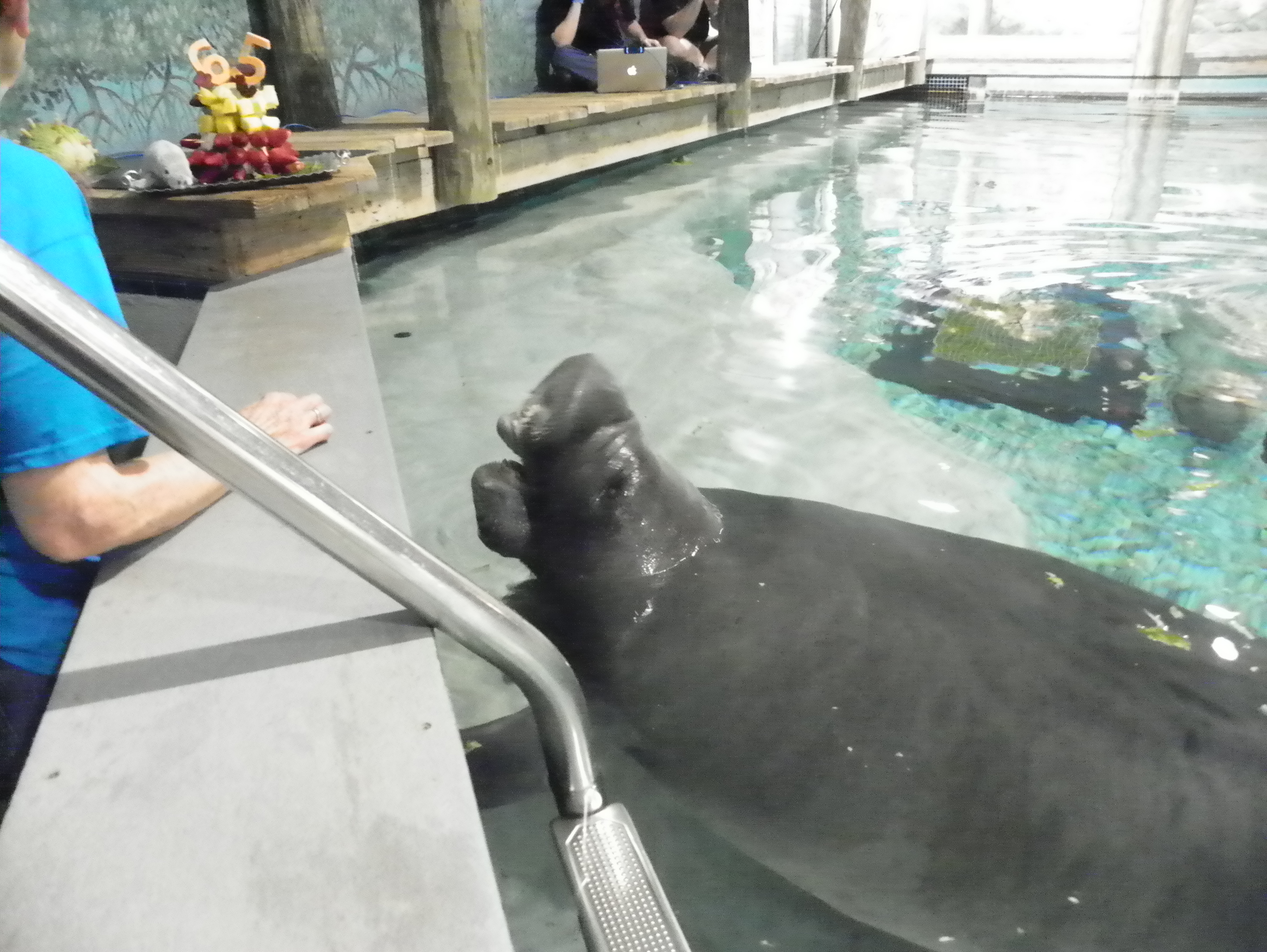
- Snooty at his 65th birthday in 2013, being presented a cake made of fruits and vegetables
- Other names: Baby, Baby Snoots
- Species: West Indian manatee
- Sex: Male
- Born: July 21, 1948; Miami, Florida, US
- Died: July 23, 2017 (aged 69); South Florida Museum, Bradenton, Florida, US
- Occupation: Mascot of Bradenton
- Known for: Oldest manatee in captivity

Snooty (July 21, 1948 – July 23, 2017) was a male Florida manatee that resided at the South Florida Museum's Parker Manatee Aquarium in Bradenton, Florida. He was one of the first recorded captive manatee births, and at age 69, he was the oldest manatee in captivity, and possibly the oldest manatee in the world. Due to his hand rearing from birth, Snooty was never released into the wild and was the only manatee at the museum's aquarium that had regular human interaction.

== Life history ==
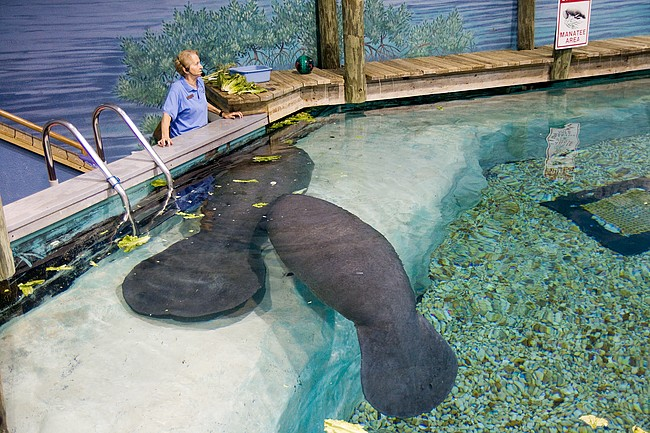
Snooty and friend on his 60th birthday, July 2008

During 1948, Samuel J. Stout, owner of the Miami Aquarium and Tackle Company, acquired a permit from the State of Florida to own a single manatee, a female he had named Lady. On July 21, 1948, Lady gave birth to a male calf Stout named "Baby". Due to his permit allowing him to keep only a single manatee, he had to find a new home for the calf. Around the same time, the city of Bradenton in Manatee County wished to acquire a manatee for their 1949 De Soto Heritage Festival, and learned of the birth of Baby at the Miami Aquarium and Tackle Company.

After De Soto Celebration Association member Walter Hardin acquired a permit for a manatee exhibition, the city built a tank on the municipal pier and arranged for Stout to bring Baby from Miami to Bradenton for the festival. Afterwards, Stout returned with the manatee to Miami, but Stout was still only legally allowed to keep a single manatee.

In April 1949, arrangements were made to allow Baby to become a permanent resident of Bradenton's South Florida Museum, where a new 3,000-U.S.-gallon (11,000 L) round tank was completed in May for Baby. Baby began living in the tank on June 20, 1949. According to the book The Legacy: South Florida Museum, Stout arrived in Bradenton late at night and was unable to locate the museum's curator, Dr. Lester Leigh, to unlock the door, and received help from the sheriff and a group of prisoners to move Baby into his new home. The manatee remained named Baby through November 1949, after which he became known as Baby Snoots, possibly by Stout, or popularly believed to have been inspired by Fanny Brice's The Baby Snooks Show. As the manatee aged, he became known simply as Snooty.

In 1966, the South Florida Aquarium moved from the Bradenton Municipal Pier to its current location, where a new, larger 9,000-U.S.-gallon (34,000 L) pool was built for Snooty. He was also granted official mascot status for Manatee County, Florida. In 1993, the museum underwent renovations, and Snooty was moved to a 60,000-U.S.-gallon (230,000 L) pool. The pool was renovated in 1998 to allow for better care for Snooty and now two more companion manatees for rehabilitation (in accordance with the Manatee Rehabilitation Network, the Sea to Shore Alliance, and the Florida Fish and Wildlife Conservation Commission). Since 1998, starting with Newton, the Parker Manatee Aquarium has helped in rehabilitation for 25 manatees.

=== Death ===
On July 23, 2017, aged 69, Snooty died as the result of drowning. A normally closed hatch door that accesses a plumbing area was open, allowing the manatees access to an unsafe area. The younger and smaller manatees were able to go in and out of the area, but due to Snooty's size, he could not return through the hatch to access air. An investigation was conducted to determine how a hatch that was normally bolted shut became open allowing access to a restricted area. The panel to the chamber where Snooty died was loose the day before his birthday. At the conclusion of the investigation, South Florida Museum released a report which determined Snooty's death had indeed been preventable and cited lapses in process and procedures that should be corrected. The Museum detailed its plans to comply with the report's recommendations and also announced that Marilyn Margold, the Director of Living Collections, no longer worked at the museum.

== Details ==
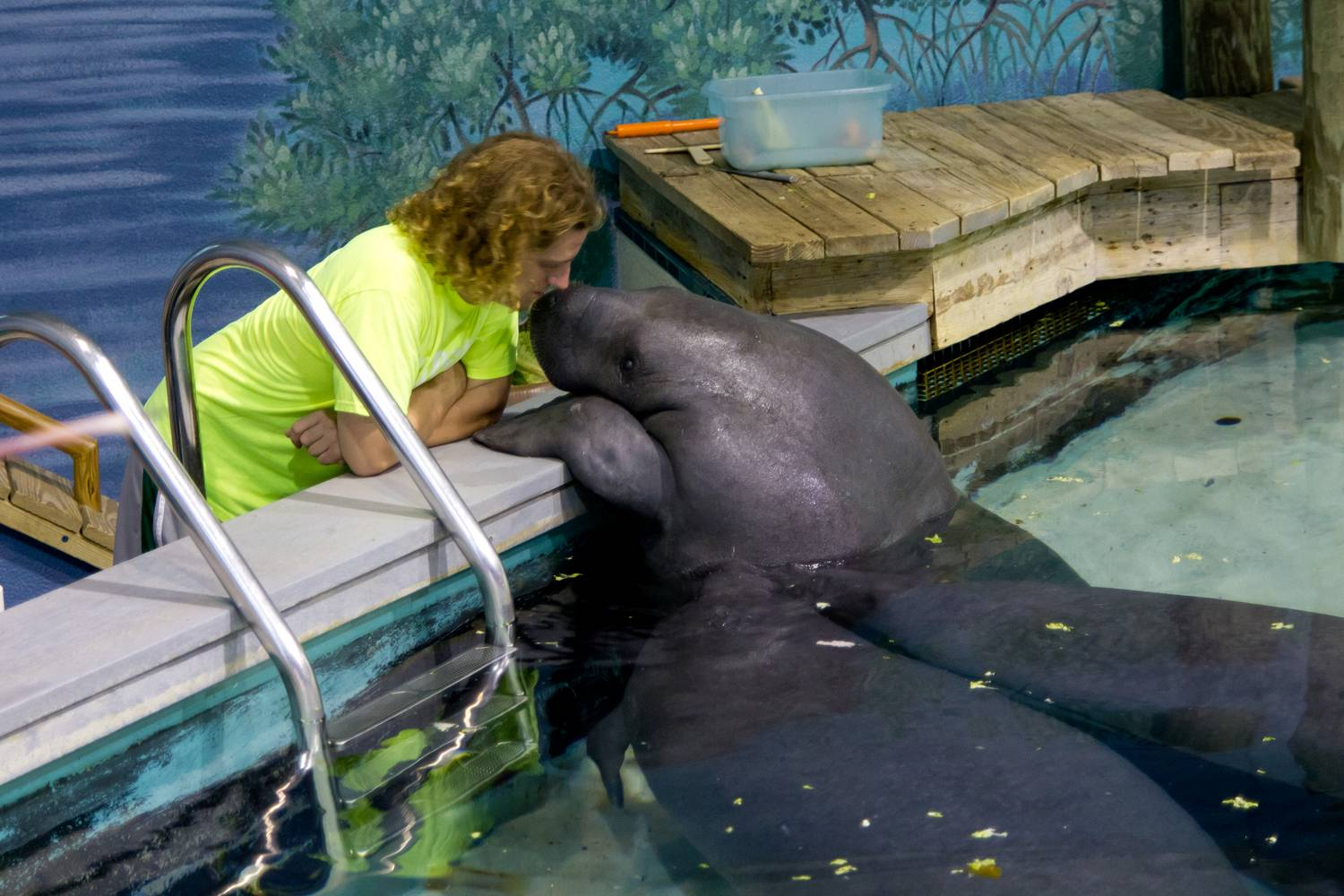
Snooty and handler on his 63rd birthday, July 2011. The aquarium strongly discourages human interaction with manatees, but Snooty was too old to be released into the wild, and his handling was the only exception made.

It had been discovered that Snooty was able to remember the voices of former keepers and remember training behaviors he learned when only one year old.

Snooty had also been used in research with the Mote Marine Laboratory. In a 2006 study, it was shown that manatees such as Snooty were capable of experimental tasks much like dolphins, disproving the preconception that manatees are unintelligent.

Snooty's birthday was a popular event at the South Florida Museum, the highlight of which was the presentation of a cake made of vegetables and fruits for Snooty while the visitors all sang "Happy Birthday" for him. Due to his known date of birth, Snooty is evidence for how long manatees are able to live.
