= Iron Block Building (Bradenton, Florida) =

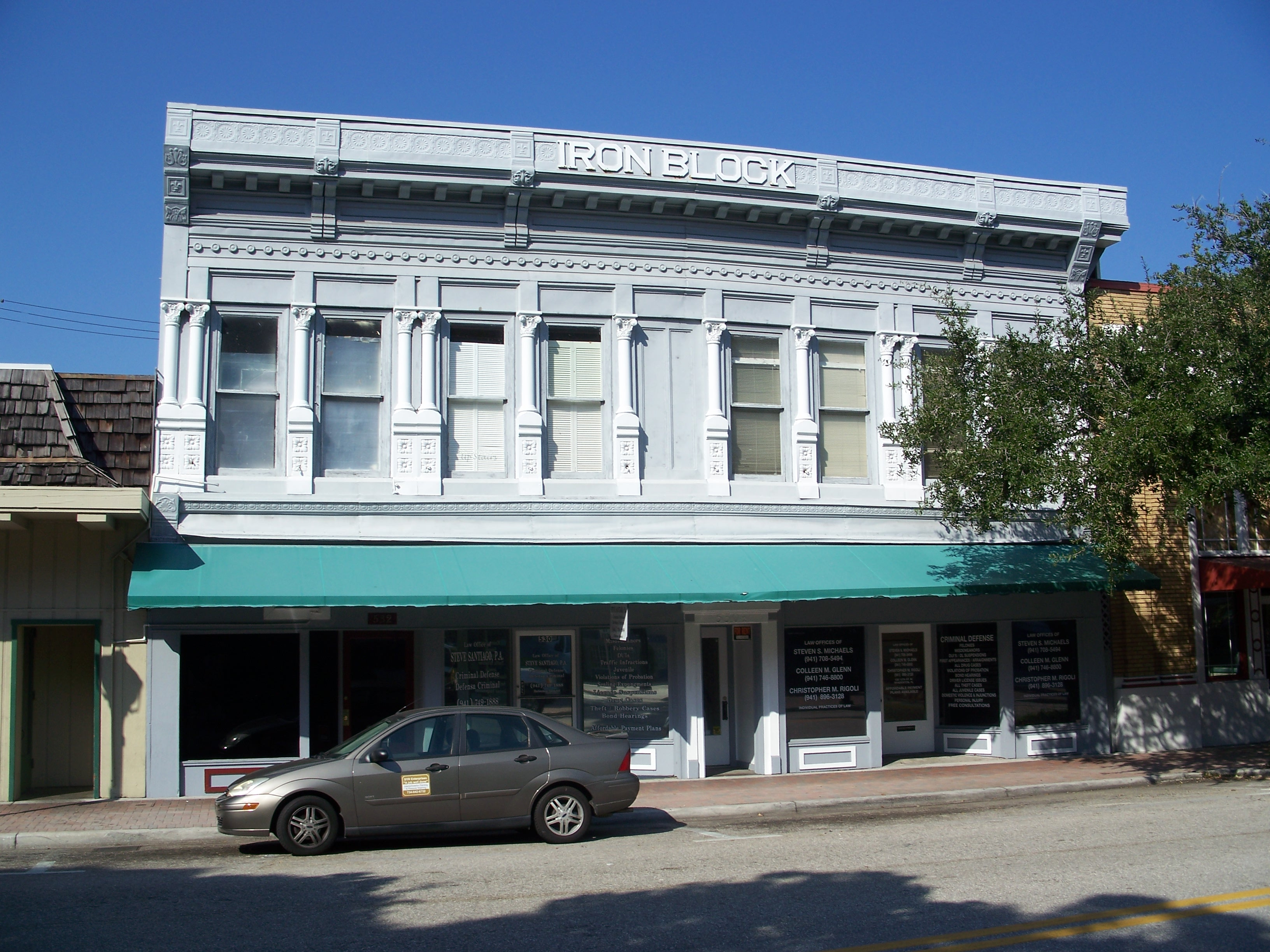
- Iron Block Building in 2010
- Interactive map of the Iron Block Building area
- Alternative names: Ballard Block Building

General information
- Architectural style: Cast-iron architecture
- Location: 530 12th Street West (Old Main Street), Bradenton, Florida, United States
- Coordinates: 27.49461°N 82.57365°W
- Completed: 1896

The Iron Block Building, so named for the words Iron Block embossed high on its front facade is an historic two-story commercial building located at 530 12th Street West (Old Main Street) across from the Manatee County Courthouse in Bradenton, Manatee County, Florida. The Iron Block Building was built in 1896 in the cast iron style of architecture by Dr. Charles Ballard. It originally housed Reed's Cash Store. The building would be moved from its original location at the southwest corner of Manatee Avenue and 12th Street West to its present location in 1921. It has been restored and according to A Guide to Florida's Historic Architecture features original "pressed metal facades on three sides."

In 1989, the Iron Block Building was listed in A Guide to Florida's Historic Architecture, published by the University of Florida Press." Today it houses professional offices and retail businesses.
