= Have Gun, Will Travel (band) =

American rock band

- Origin: Bradenton, Florida, United States
- Genres: Alternative rock; folk rock
- Years active: 2006–present
- Members: Matt Burke; Daniel Burke; JP Beaubien; Scott Anderson
- Website: hgwtmusic.com

Have Gun, Will Travel is an American Alternative rock/folk rock rock band formed in January 2006. Based in Bradenton, Florida, they make reference to the town in several songs, including "Salad Days", from the 2009 album Postcards from the Friendly City (The Friendly City" is a local nickname for Bradenton). Their name is taken from the 1957–1963 Western series Have Gun – Will Travel. The band consists of vocalist and guitarist Matt Burke, guitarist Scott Anderson, bassist Daniel Burke, and drummer JP Beaubien.

The group's music includes Americana, folk rock, country, and punk rock influences, and has been featured in a national Chevrolet television commercial as well as the PBS series Roadtrip Nation. Their song "Blessing and a Curse" was used during the final scenes and credits of The Good Wife, season 3, episode 21, in 2012.

Lead vocalist Matt Burke's songwriting draws on western themes of life and death, honor, and morality throughout the band's narrative songs. Their fifth record, Science from an Easy Chair, is a concept album based entirely on British explorer Sir Ernest Shackleton and his 1914–16 Imperial Trans-Antarctic Expedition.

== Band members ==
- Matt Burke – vocals, guitar, harmonica
- Daniel Burke – bass, vocals
- JP Beaubien – drums, percussion
- Scott Anderson – guitars

== Discography ==
- Casting Shadows Tall as Giants (2008)
- Postcards from the Friendly City (2009)
- Mergers & Acquisitions (2011)
- Fiction, Fact or Folktale? (2013)
- Science from an Easy Chair (2015)
- Strange Chemistry (2019)
- Silver Sounds (EP, 2022)
