= Neal Preserve =

Nature preserve in Florida, United States

- IUCN category V (protected landscape/seascape)
- Location within Manatee County
- Location: Manatee County, Florida
- Nearest city: Holmes Beach
- Coordinates: 27°29′35″N 82°41′08″W
- Area: 120 acres (0.49 km^{2})
- Established: July 21, 2005
- Website: Official website

Neal Preserve is a 120-acre (49 ha) preserve in Manatee County, Florida abutting the southern portion of State Road 64 near the western approach of Anna Maria Island Bridge. The preserve contains one-half-mile (0.80 km) of shell and boardwalk trails and a 20-foot (6.1 m) tall observation tower.

== Overview ==
Manatee County used federal grants and local money to buy the Perico Island site for $9 million in 2005 and then spent an additional $1.5 million towards building the preserve. The preserve opened to the public on April 9, 2014.
