= Manatee County Area Transit =

Public transit service in Manatee County, Florida

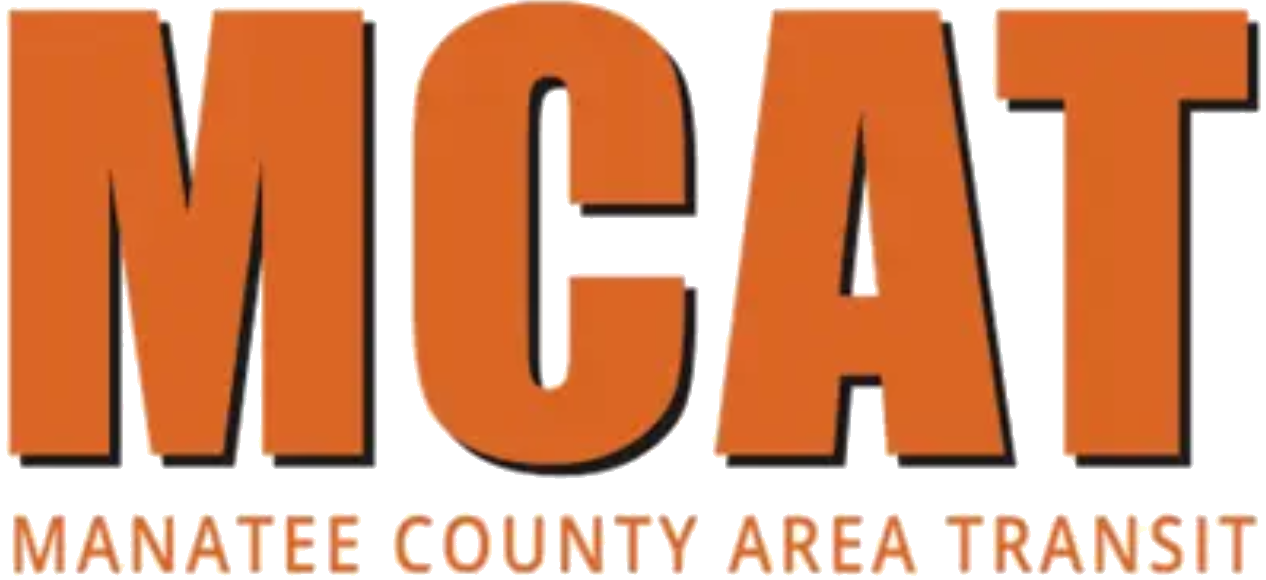

Overview
- Owner: Manatee County, Florida
- Area served: Manatee County
- Locale: Manatee County
- Transit type: bus service
- Daily ridership: 6,500 (weekdays, Q2 2026)
- Annual ridership: (2025)
- Headquarters: 2411 Tallevast Road; Sarasota, FL 34243
- Website: www.mymanatee.org/departments/mcat

Manatee County Area Transit (MCAT) is the public transportation provider for Manatee County, Florida and is operated by the county. the system had about 6,500 riders per weekday as of the second quarter of 2026.

== Routes ==
MCAT operates local bus routes, most of which operate Monday through Saturday.

Route	Name
1	Ellenton Outlet Mall
2	East Bradenton
3	Manatee Avenue
4	9th Avenue
6	Cortez Road
8	Oneco-Bayshore Gardens
9	9th Avenue West / 26th Street
12	State Road 70
13	Palmetto
16	15th Street East
99	Bradenton / Sarasota
201	North County Connexion
203	SkyWay Connexion
304	Manatee Avenue West, Manatee Beach
PMX	Port Manatee Connection Shuttle
Trolley	Anna Maria Island
Trolley	Beach Express
Shuttle	Longboat Key

== Fares ==
The regular bus fare is $1.50 on all local fixed routes. Discounted fares of $0.75 are available for students, disabled (with mobility card), seniors, medicare card holders, and active duty and military veterans. There is no fare for children 5 years or younger and seniors 80 and older. There is no fare for the Anna Maria Island Trolley and the Sunday Beach Express. Discounted fares are not available for the Longboat Key Shuttle.

Unlimited ride cards ("M Cards") are available for purchase for 1 day, 7 day, or 31 days. Regular and discounted rates are available. There is also a 31-day regional pass ("R Card") available for purchase. This pass is good for unlimited rides on both MCAT and Sarasota County Area Transit buses.

Riders can also purchase and access their bus passes using the Token Transit mobile ticketing app for both local and regional fares.

== Fleet ==
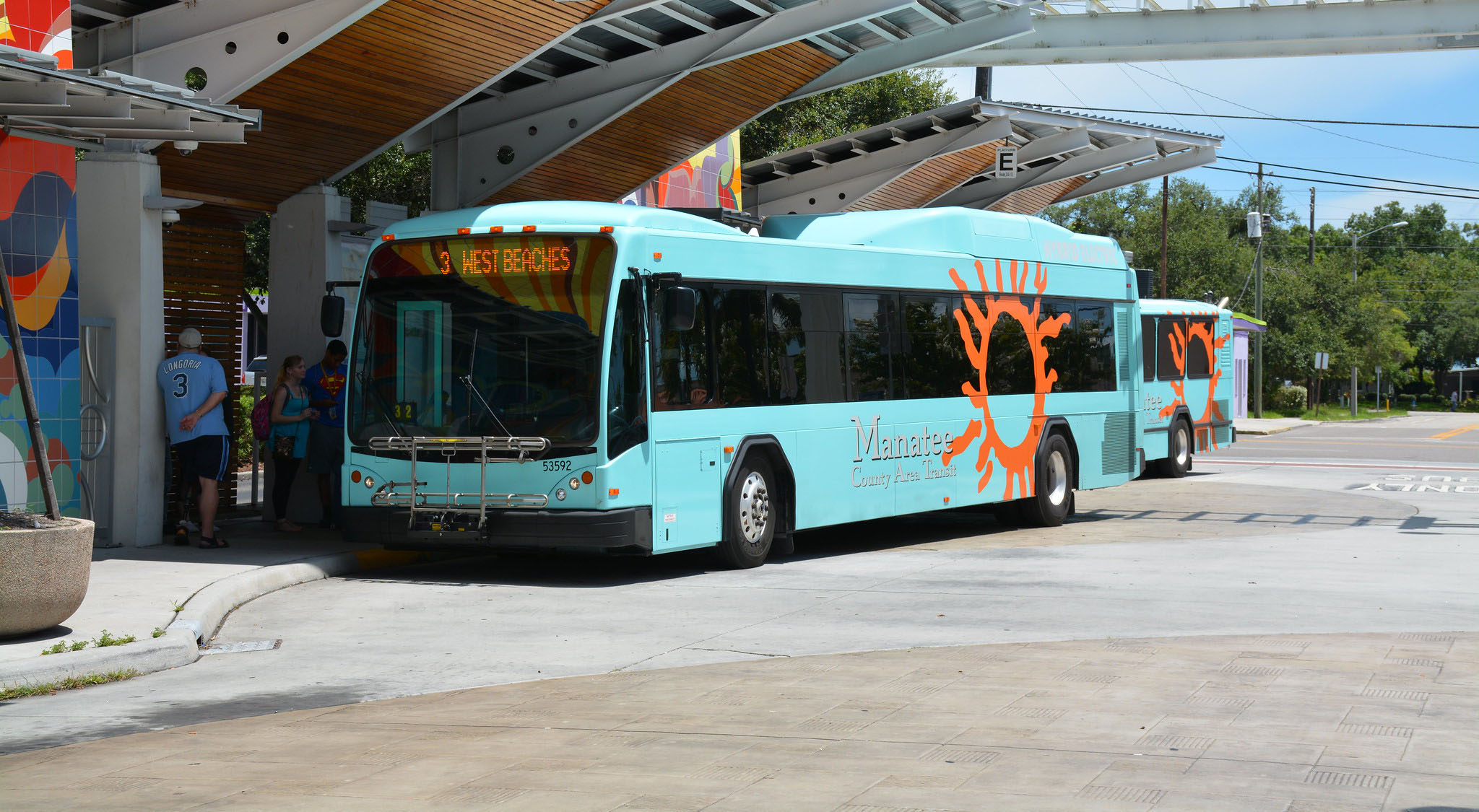
MCAT bus at Downtown Bradenton Transit Station

MCAT's fleet consists of Gillig Phantom, Low Floor, Low Floor BRT, and Replica Trolley. They operate both diesel and diesel-electric hybrid buses.

In 2018, MCAT was awarded $1.9 million by the U.S. Department of Transportation Federal Transit Administration to replace or rehabilitate their fleet of buses.
